= David G. Read =

American Episcopal bishop

The Right Reverend David G. Read
- XI Bishop of West Texas
- Church: Episcopal Church
- Diocese: West Texas
- Predecessor: David M. Reed
- Previous posts: Rector, St. Helena's Episcopal Church, Boerne, Texas

Orders
- Consecration: July 8, 2023 by W. Michie Klusmeyer, David M. Reed, Rayford B. High Jr., Jonathan Folts, James E. Folts, Kathryn McCrossen Ryan, Susan J. Briner, (ELCA Bishop)

Personal details
- Denomination: Anglican

Ordination history of David G. Read
History
Episcopal consecration
- Principal consecrator: W. Michie Klusmeyer
- Co-consecrators: David M. Reed, Rayford B. High Jr., Jonathan Folts, James E. Folts, Kathryn McCrossen Ryan, Susan J. Briner

David G. Read is an American Episcopal bishop. He has served as the eleventh bishop of West Texas since 2023.

== Ordained ministry ==
Read served as rector of St. Helena's Episcopal Church in Boerne, Texas, before his election as bishop. During his tenure, he focused on congregational growth and community outreach.

== Episcopacy ==
On July 8, 2023, Read was consecrated as the eleventh bishop of the Episcopal Diocese of West Texas at the Tobin Center for the Performing Arts in San Antonio, Texas. The service was led by Bishop W. Michie Klusmeyer, with co-consecrators including Episcopal Bishops David M. Reed, Rayford B. High Jr., Jonathan Folts, James E. Folts, and Kathryn McCrossen Ryan as well as Bishop Susan J. Briner of the Evangelical Lutheran Church in America.

Episcopal Church (USA) titles
Preceded by David M. Reed	Bishop of West Texas; 2023−present	Incumbent
