= Folts =

Folts may refer to:

== People ==
- Arina Folts (born 1997), Uzbekistani tennis player
- James E. Folts (born 1940), U.S. bishop of the Episcopal Diocese of West Texas
- Jonas Folts (1808-1876), U.S. farmer and politician
- Jonathan Folts (born 1968), U.S. prelate of the Episcopal Church; eleventh Bishop of South Dakota

== Other uses ==
- Folts Mission Institute, defunct Methodist training school in New York
