= Rayford B. High Jr. =

The Right Reverend Rayford B. High Jr.
- Provisional Bishop of Fort Worth
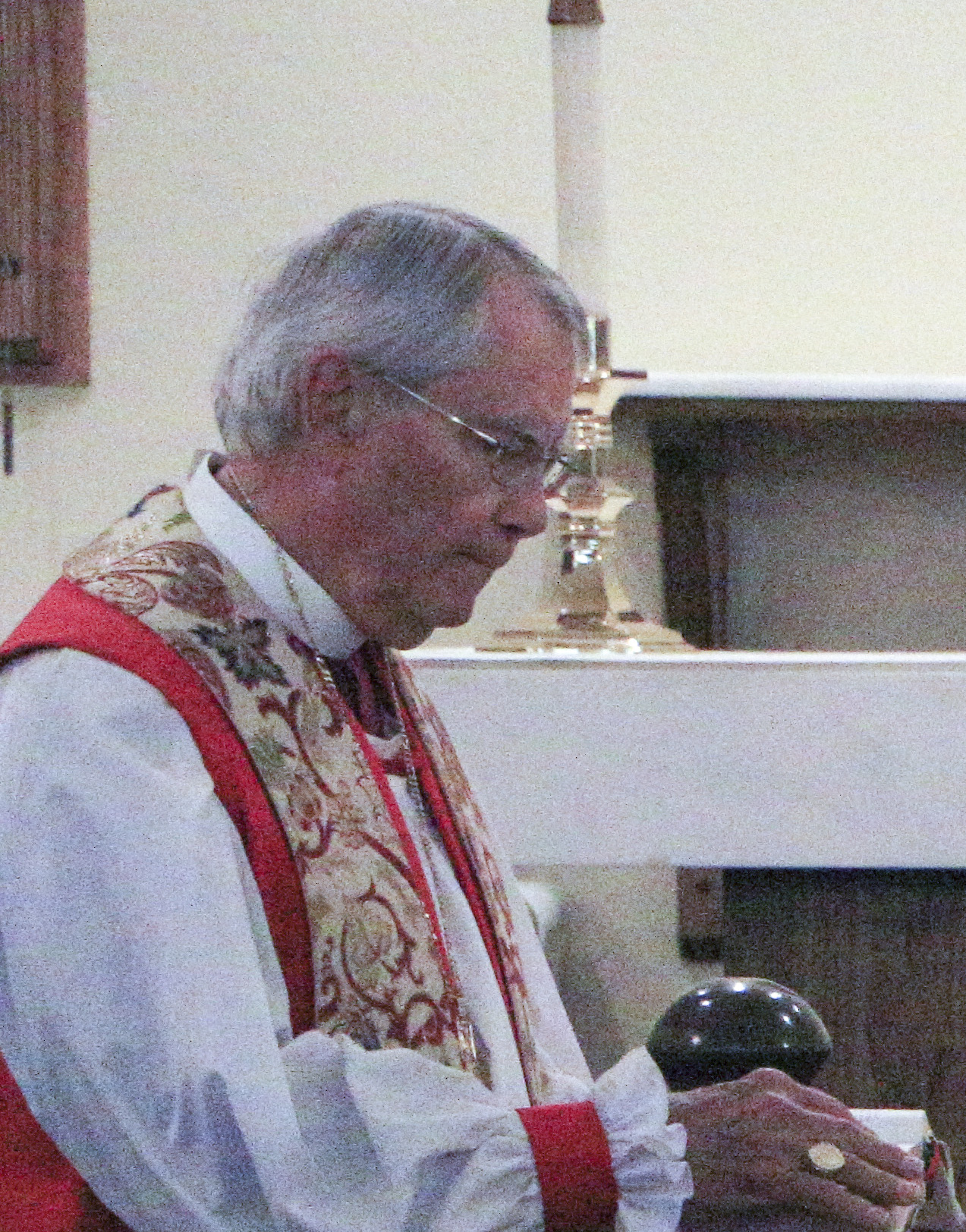
- Church: Episcopal Church
- Diocese: Fort Worth
- Elected: September 19, 2012
- In office: 2012-2015
- Predecessor: C. Wallis Ohl Jr.
- Successor: Scott Mayer
- Other post: Assistant Bishop of West Texas (2021-present)
- Previous post: Suffragan Bishop of Texas (2003-2012)

Orders
- Ordination: January 6, 1967 by Richard Earl Dicus
- Consecration: October 4, 2003 by D. Bruce MacPherson

Personal details
- Born: January 1941 (age 85) Houston, Texas, United States
- Denomination: Anglican
- Spouse: Pat Mosley (m. 1965; died 2015) Ann Normand (m. 2017)
- Children: 3

Rayford B. High Jr. (born January 1941) is a bishop of the Episcopal Church. He served as suffragan bishop of the Episcopal Diocese of Texas and then as provisional bishop of the Episcopal Diocese of Fort Worth from November, 2012 through June, 2015. He currently serves as an assisting bishop of the Episcopal Diocese of West Texas.

== Early life and education ==
High was born in April 1941 in Houston, Texas. He was educated at Bellaire High School. He then studied at the University of the South, and later at the Episcopal Theological School in Cambridge, Massachusetts.

== Ordained ministry ==
High was ordained deacon on June 28, 1966 by Bishop Everett Holland Jones of West Texas and priest by Bishop Richard Earl Dicus on January 6, 1967. He initially served as curate at St Mark's Church in San Antonio and then became rector of St Francis' Church in Victoria, Texas. He was also rector of St John's Church in McAllen, Texas and then in 1981 he became rector of St Paul's Church in Waco, Texas. He was also canon for pastoral ministry in the Diocese of Texas.

== Bishop ==
High was elected on the fourth ballot as Suffragan Bishop of Texas on June 7, 2003 in Christ Church Cathedral. He was consecrated on October 4, 2003 at Camp Allen by Bishop D. Bruce MacPherson of Western Louisiana. As suffragan bishop he oversaw 44 congregations in the Northeast, Northwest and Southeast Convocations. He retained the post until his election as Provisional Bishop of Fort Worth on September 19, 2012, and was installed on November 3, 2012. He retired in June 2015 but continued as an Assisting Bishop to the Diocese of Fort Worth. In October 2020 he was appointed Assistant Bishop in the Episcopal Diocese of West Texas, a role he commenced on February 1, 2021.

== Family ==
High married Pat Mosley High in 1965 and together they had three children. Pat died in 2015 and he remarried on August 12, 2017 to the Rev. Dr. Canon Ann Normand at St Paul’s Church in Waco.

== See also ==
- List of Episcopal bishops of the United States
- Historical list of the Episcopal bishops of the United States
