= Jennifer Brooke-Davidson =

American prelate

The Right Reverend Jennifer Brooke-Davidson
- Assistant Bishop of North Carolina
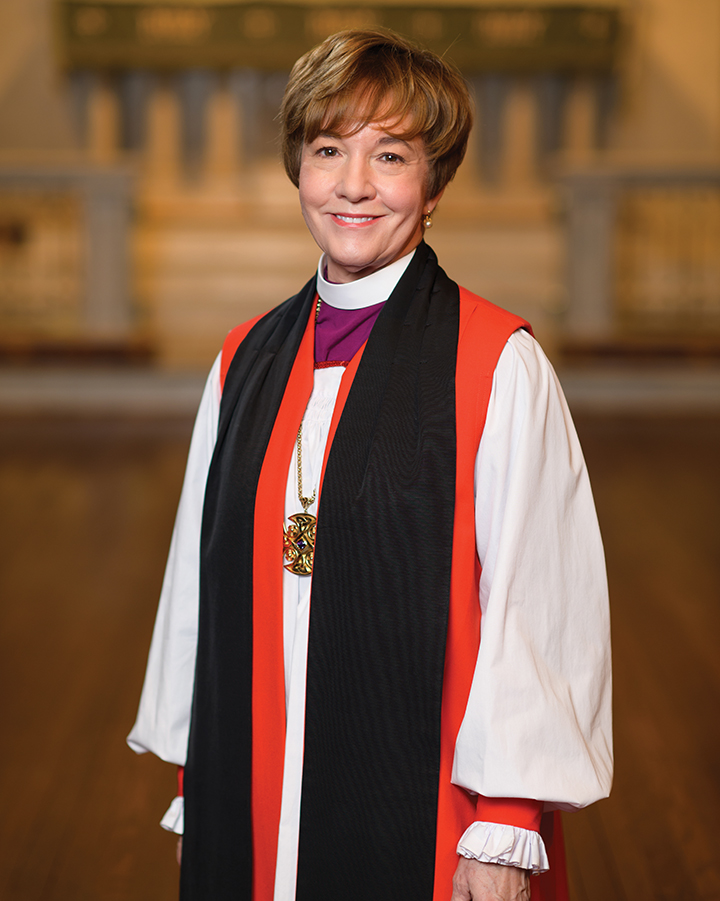
- Jennifer Brooke-Davidson in 2022
- Church: Episcopal Church
- Diocese: North Carolina
- Elected: August 16, 2022
- In office: 2022-present
- Previous posts: Suffragan Bishop of West Texas (2016-2019); Assistant Bishop of Virginia (2019-2022)

Orders
- Ordination: December 16, 2009 by Gary Lillibridge
- Consecration: July 29, 2016 by Michael Curry

Personal details
- Born: Jennifer Brooke; June 29, 1960 (age 65) Corpus Christi, Texas, United States
- Denomination: Anglican
- Parents: John Charles Brooke & Sherry Sigler Anderson
- Spouse: Carrick Brooke-Davidson (m. 1985)
- Children: 2

Jennifer Brooke-Davidson (born June 29, 1960) is an American prelate of the Episcopal Church who is currently the Assistant Bishop in the Episcopal Diocese of North Carolina.

== Early life and education ==
Jennifer Brooke was born on June 29, 1960, in Corpus Christi, Texas, to John Charles Brooke and Sherry Sigler Anderson. She studied at Yale University and graduated with a Bachelor of Arts in history in 1982. Between 1982 and 1985 she studied at the University of Texas School of Law, from where she gained her Juris Doctor. She then spent the next 12 years practicing commercial finance law in Washington, D.C. Later she served as Director of Religious Education and Director of Formation and Evangelism in Texas. In 2007 she decided to commence training for the ordained ministry at Fuller Theological Seminary, graduating in 2009.

== Ordained ministry ==
Brooke-Davidson was ordained deacon on June 10, 2009, by Bishop David M. Reed, and then as a priest on December 16, 2009, by Bishop Gary Lillibridge at St Stephen’s Church in Wimberley, Texas. She then served as assistant rector of St Stephen's Church between 2009 and 2011, after which she became vicar of St Elizabeth's Church in Buda, Texas. She retained the latter post until 2017.

== Bishop ==
She was elected as the sixth Suffragan bishop of the Episcopal Diocese of West Texas during the 113th annual Diocesan Council on February 25, 2017. She was then consecrated on July 29, 2016, at Christ Church in San Antonio, Texas, by Presiding Bishop Michael Curry. In 2019 she resigned her post as suffragan bishop after she became assistant bishop of the Episcopal Diocese of Virginia. She commenced her duties there on November 1, 2019. In August 2022, she was also chosen to serve as assistant bishop in the Episcopal Diocese of North Carolina and completed her work in Virginia on September 22, 2022. She became the assistant bishop in North Carolina on November 1, 2022.

She married Carrick Brooke-Davidson on August 17, 1985, and they have two children.
