= Everett Jones =

Everett Jones may refer to the following people:

- Everett Holland Jones (1902–1995), Bishop of West Texas
- Everett Leroy Jones (1934–2014), birth name of American writer Amiri Baraka
