= Bertha Fowler =

Bertha Fowler (June 25, 1866 – May 27, 1952) was an American educator, as well as a Methodist Episcopal Church preacher and deaconess. In 1901, she established the Woman's Home Missionary Society of the Methodist Episcopal Church, which united with the Woman's Foreign Missionary Society of the Methodist Episcopal Church in 1908.

== Early life and education ==
Bertha Fowler was born in Lena, Illinois, June 25, 1866. Her parents were Harry Griswold and Sallie M. (Pickard) Fowler, the latter of whom was a native of the state of New York.

Reared in Lena, Fowler was graduated from the high school there with the class of 1884.

== Career ==
In the fall of 1884, she began teaching in one of the local schools, continuing to do so until the spring of 1887, when she entered the Chicago Training School for Home and Foreign Missions, designed for the training of students for the mission field. She gave special attention to the course in city social welfare work, a growing department of the home mission work, and in 1888, she graduated from that institution.

Fowler entered upon evangelistic work in the fall of 1888, through 1898, this service taking her into a wide field all through the northern part of Illinois, through the state of Iowa and through northern Kansas. In September, 1890, Fowler entered Garrett Biblical Institute at Evanston, Illinois, and in May, 1893, was graduated from that institution.

In March of 1898, she was appointed superintendent of Mercy Home for Boys and Girls in Chicago and for more than six years thereafter, she was actively engaged in general settlement and social welfare work there. On September 1, 1904, she entered upon a new service as superintendent of the Deaconess Home and Settlement in Philadelphia, Pennsylvania. For ten years, Fowler continued to serve as superintendent of this institution.

In June, 1908, Fowler was given the honorary degree of Master of Arts by Baker University at Baldwin City, Kansas. That summer, Fowler taught classes in five Epworth League institutes.

On September 1, 1914, she transferred her services to the Folts Mission Institute at Herkimer, New York, of which institution she was elected president.

During the time that the United States participated in World War I, Fowler served as a volunteer in the War Motor Corps of Herkimer County, New York.

Fowler was a member of the Methodist Episcopal Church at Herkimer and on November 8, 1920, was licensed as a local preacher by the Northern New York conference of the Methodist church. For more than 27 years, she was a member and in the employ of the Woman's Home Missionary Society of the Methodist Episcopal Church.

Fowler was a member of the National Women Preachers Association, a charter member of the Religious Education Association, and a member of the locally influential Zonta Club of Utica, New York. She was also an active member of the Herkimer union of the Woman's Christian Temperance Union and did effective work in that behalf. She was an expert driver and found her chief diversion in auto trips throughout the valley. In politics, she was a republican and took an interest in local civic affairs, being one of the leaders in feminist movements designed to elevate the standards of government in the community. Frances Willard was a personal acquaintenance.

== Later life ==
By 1936, Fowler was a retired Methodist deaconess and living in Milwaukee, Wisconsin.

Bertha Fowler died May 27, 1952.
