= Robert Hibbs =

Robert Hibbs may refer to:

- Robert John Hibbs (1943–1966), United States Army officer and Medal of Honor recipient
- Robert B. Hibbs (1932–2017), suffragan bishop of the Episcopal church
