= Harold Gosnell =

American bishop

The Right Reverend Harold Cornelius Gosnell
- Bishop of West Texas
- Church: Episcopal Church
- Diocese: West Texas
- Elected: May 1, 1968
- In office: 1968-1977
- Predecessor: Everett Holland Jones
- Successor: Scott Bailey
- Previous post: Coadjutor Bishop of West Texas (1968)

Orders
- Ordination: April 1933 (deacon); November 1933 (priest) by Charles Fiske
- Consecration: September 11, 1968 by John E. Hines

Personal details
- Born: July 17, 1908 Syracuse, New York, United States
- Died: July 18, 1999 (aged 91) San Antonio, Texas, United States
- Denomination: Anglican
- Parents: Cornelius Parsons Gosnell and Carrie Fawcett
- Spouse: Marjorie O. Adams (m. 1932; died 1998)
- Children: 2

Harold Cornelius Gosnell (July 17, 1908 – July 18, 1999) was the fifth Bishop of West Texas in The Episcopal Church, serving from December 31, 1968, until March 1, 1977.

== Early life and education ==
Gosnell was born in Syracuse, New York, on July 17, 1908, to Cornelius Parsons Gosnell and Carrie Fawcett. He was educated at the Syracuse High School and later studied at Syracuse University and graduated with a Bachelor of Arts in 1930. He then completed training for the priesthood at the Episcopal Theological Seminary in Cambridge, Massachusetts, earning a Bachelor of Divinity in 1933. He was awarded an honorary Doctor of Divinity from the University of the South in 1956. He married Marjorie O. Adams on August 29, 1932, and together had two children.

== Career ==
Gosnell was ordained deacon in April 1933 and priest in November 1933 by Bishop Charles Fiske of Central New York. He served as rector of St John's Church in Marcellus, New York, between 1933 and 1936 and then as rector of All Saints' Church in Fulton, New York, from 1936 until 1938. He then became rector of Holy Trinity Church in Lincoln, Nebraska, and remained there until 1948 when he was appointed rector of St Mark's Church in San Antonio and remained there for 20 years. During World War II, Gosnell enlisted as a Navy chaplain and served two years in the South Pacific. He remained an active officer in the Naval Reserve until his retirement as captain on July 31, 1968.

== Episcopacy ==
Gosnell was elected Coadjutor Bishop of West Texas at a Special Meeting of the Council convened at St Mark's Church on May 1, 1968. He was then consecrated bishop on September 11, 1968, at the San Antonio Convention Center by Presiding Bishop John E. Hines. He succeeded as diocesan bishop on December 31, 1968, and remain in office until his retirement on March 1, 1977. He then was co-chair of Venture in Mission. He died on July 18, 1999, at his home in San Antonio, a day after his 91st birthday.
