= James E. Folts =

The Right Reverend James Edward Folts
- Bishop of West Texas
- Church: Episcopal Church
- Diocese: West Texas
- Elected: October 2, 1993
- In office: 1996-2006
- Predecessor: John H. MacNaughton
- Successor: Gary Lillibridge
- Previous post: Coadjutor Bishop of West Texas (1994-1995)

Orders
- Ordination: January 1966 by Richard Earl Dicus
- Consecration: February 17, 1994 by Edmond L. Browning

Personal details
- Born: March 11, 1940 (age 86) San Antonio, Texas, United States
- Denomination: Anglican
- Spouse: Sandra Pauline Johnston
- Children: 2

James Edward Folts (born March 11, 1940) was bishop of the Episcopal Diocese of West Texas, serving from 1996 to 2006.

== Early life and education ==
Folts was born on March 11, 1940, in San Antonio, Texas. He studied at Trinity University in San Antonio, after which he enrolled at the Virginia Theological Seminary from where he graduated with a Master of Divinity in 1965. He was awarded honorary Doctor of Divinity degrees from the Virginia Theological Seminary and the University of the South, respectively.

== Ordained ministry ==
Folts was ordained deacon in July 1965 by Bishop Everett Holland Jones and then priest in January 1966 by Bishop Richard Earl Dicus. He married Sandra Pauline Johnston and together had two children, including Jonathan Folts who is the current Bishop of South Dakota. He initially was in charge of St James' Church in Hebbronville, Texas, and Grace Church in Falfurrias, Texas until 1967. In 1967 he became assistant rector of St Francis Church in Victoria, Texas and Trinity Church in Edna, Texas. He also served in San Marcos, Texas and Brownsville, Texas. He was also rector of the Church of the Heavenly Rest in Abilene, Texas. he was also the founder of St Stephen's Church in Wimberley, Texas. Prior to his election, he was rector of St Mark's Church in San Antonio.

== Bishop ==
Folts was elected on the third ballot as coadjutor bishop of West Texas on October 2, 1993. He was then consecrated on February 17, 1994, at the San Antonio Municipal Auditorium by Presiding Bishop Edmond L. Browning as chief consecrator. He then succeeded as diocesan bishop on January 1, 1996, and remained in office until his retirement in 2006.
