= Earl N. McArthur =

The Right Reverend Earl Nicholas McArthur
- Suffragan Bishop of West Texas
- Church: Episcopal Church
- Diocese: West Texas
- Elected: September 19, 1987
- In office: 1988-1993
- Predecessor: Stanley F. Hauser
- Successor: Robert B. Hibbs

Orders
- Ordination: January 15, 1964 by Everett Holland Jones
- Consecration: January 6, 1988 by Edmond L. Browning

Personal details
- Born: January 1, 1925 Houston, Texas, United States
- Died: July 17, 2016 (aged 91) Wimberley, Texas, United States
- Buried: St Stephen's Cemetery, Wimberley
- Denomination: Anglican
- Parents: Earl Nicholas McArthur & Nanabelle Stanfield
- Spouse: Shirley Beth Nyberg (m. 1948; died 2005)
- Children: 4

Earl Nicholas McArthur Jr. (January 1, 1925 - July 17, 2016) was a suffragan bishop of the Episcopal Diocese of West Texas.

== Early life and education ==
McArthur was born in Houston, Texas on January 1, 1925 to Earl Nicholas McArthur Sr. and Nanabelle Stanfield. He served in the U.S. Navy in the Pacific between 1943 and 1946. He then studied at Rice University from where he earned a Bachelor of Arts in 1948 and later undertook postgraduate studies at the University of Houston between 1948 and 1949. He then spent a number of years working as a petroleum engineer and district manager for drilling mud sales for the Alamo Lumber Company. In 1960, he commenced theological studies at the Virginia Theological Seminary, from where he graduated with a Master of Divinity in 1963.

== Ordained ministry ==
McArthur was ordained deacon in 1963 and then priest on January 15, 1964 by Bishop Everett Holland Jones of West Texas. He served as deacon-in-charge and later rector of the Church of the Annunciation in Luling, Texas between 1963 and 1965, after which he became associate rector of the Church of the Holy Spirit in Houston, Texas. In 1967, he was called to serve as rector of All Saints' Church in Corpus Christi, Texas, while in 1981 he transferred to Wimberley, Texas to serve as rector of St Stephen's Church.

== Bishop ==
On September 19, 1987, MacArthur was elected on the fifth ballot as Suffragan Bishop of the Episcopal Diocese of West Texas. He was consecrated on January 6, 1988 with Presiding Bishop Edmond L. Browning as chief consecrator in the First United Methodist Church, Corpus Christi, Texas. He retired on December 31, 1993. He died in Wimberley, Texas on July 17, 2016. He married Shirley Beth Nyberg on February 4, 1948 and they had two sons and two daughters.
