= Richard Earl Dicus =

Suffragan bishop of the Episcopal Diocese of West Texas

The Right Reverend Richard Earl Dicus
- Suffragan Bishop of West Texas
- Church: Episcopal Church
- Diocese: West Texas
- Elected: April 18, 1955
- In office: 1955-1976
- Successor: Stanley F. Hauser

Orders
- Ordination: January 1938 (deacon); November 1938 (priest) by Walter Mitchell
- Consecration: July 22, 1955 by Everett Holland Jones

Personal details
- Born: September 1, 1910 Jerome, Arizona Territory, United States
- Died: January 13, 1996 (aged 85) Green Valley, Arizona, United States
- Buried: City of Nogales Cemetery, Nogales, Arizona
- Denomination: Anglican
- Parents: Stanley Fillmore Hauser & Elizabeth Mary Merriman
- Spouse: Mildred Dawson (m. 1938; died 1986)
- Children: 2
- Education: University of the South

Richard Earl Dicus (September 1, 1910 – January 13, 1996) was suffragan bishop of the Episcopal Diocese of West Texas, serving from 1955 until his retirement in 1976.

== Early life and education ==
Dicus was born in Jerome, Arizona on September 1, 1910 to Harry Everett Dicus (1873-1949) and Matilda Elizabeth Lawrence (1875-1951). He attended Phoenix College and Hampden–Sydney College. He then studied at the University of the South from which he graduated with a Bachelor of Divinity in 1937.

== Ordained ministry ==
Dicus was ordained deacon in January 1938 and priest in November 1938 by the Missionary Bishop of Arizona Walter Mitchell. He married Mildred Dawson (1916-1986) on September 10, 1938 and together they had two children. He served as vicar of Good Samaritan Mission in Phoenix, Arizona between 1938 and 1941, and then was priest-in-charge of St Andrew's Church in Tucson, Arizona from 1941 to 1942. From 1942 to 1946, he was rector of St Paul's Church in Batesville, Arkansas, and between 1944 and 1946 he was also vicar of Trinity Church in Searcy, Arkansas. In 1946, he moved to Eagle Pass, Texas to serve as rector of the Church of the Redeemer and priest-in-charge of Holy Trinity Church in Carrizo Springs, Texas, and remained there until 1955.

== Bishop ==
On April 18, 1955, during a special council meeting at St Mark's Church, Dicus was elected Suffragan Bishop of West Texas on the fifth ballot. He was consecrated on July 22, 1955 by Bishop Everett Holland Jones of West Texas and remained in office until his retirement in 1976. He died on January 13, 1996.
