= TMI Episcopal =

Location
- 20955 West Tejas Trail; San Antonio, Texas 78257; United States; 29.638292°N 98.604333°W

Information
- Type: Private Independent; Co-educational; Non-residential boarding College-Preparatory high school.
- Motto: Nihil Supra Mores; Ducit qui Servit
- Religious affiliation: Episcopal Church in the United States of America
- Established: 1893; 133 years ago
- Founder: James Steptoe Johnston
- CEEB code: 446255
- Chairman of the Governors: The Rt. Rev. David M. Reed
- Head of school: Rev. Scott J. Brown
- Faculty: 46
- Gender: Co-educational
- Enrollment: 640
- Average class size: 15 students
- Student to teacher ratio: 9:1
- Campus size: 80 acres (320,000 m^{2})
Color
- Song: For the Splendor of Creation
- Athletics: 19 Interscholastic Sports
- Mascot: Prima the Panther
- Nickname: Panthers
- Accreditations: Independent Schools Association of the Southwest (ISAS) and Southwestern Association of Episcopal Schools (SAES)
- School fees: $26,312 (Middle School day students); $29,477 (Upper School day students); $53,330 (5-day boarding); $58,490 (7-day boarding students, American or international) as of the 23-24 School Year
- Website: www.tmi-sa.org

TMI Episcopal is a private school in San Antonio. Previously known as Texas Military Institute, TMI is a selective coeducational Episcopal college preparatory school with a military tradition in San Antonio, Texas for boarding and day students. It is the sole secondary school of the Episcopal Diocese of West Texas. Founded as West Texas School for Boys, the school was later known as West Texas Military Academy, and popularly nicknamed 'West Point on the Rio Grande'; it is not located on the Rio Grande. General Douglas MacArthur attended the school.

== History ==
TMI was founded in 1893 by James Steptoe Johnston, the second Bishop of West Texas in the Protestant Episcopal Church. Johnston was a native Mississippian of the planter class who had fought in twelve engagements in the Civil War, most with the Eleventh Mississippi Regiment. J.S. Johnston had deep Virginia roots and was a student at the University of Virginia before volunteering for military service in 1861. A cousin was Major General Joseph Eggleston Johnston. His grandmother's family, the Steptoes, were blood-kin of George Washington.

Johnston's earliest name for his school in San Antonio was "The West Texas School for Boys," which was quickly changed to "West Texas Military Academy". In 1926, the name was changed to Texas Military Institute.

At the time of the school's foundation, San Antonio lay on the edge of the American frontier, with forts all along the high ground east of the Rio Grande. Johnston created a Church school with full-fledged military discipline, a combination not unusual for Southern boarding schools.

The first rector and headmaster was Allan Lucien Burleson, a priest prepared at the Shattuck School in Minnesota and a graduate of both Racine College and Nashotah House Seminary in Wisconsin. Burleson was Rector of WTMA from 1893 to 1910. The school was then largely funded by donations from wealthy residents of the eastern seaboard, many of whom had heard Johnston speak on the importance of academic and moral education for all young men. The Bishop once wrote, "The best use of wealth is to coin it into character." When the school first opened adjacent to St. Paul's Church in Government Hill, there were six teachers and twelve students.

W. W. Bondurant changed the name to "Texas Military Institute" in 1926. In 1936, at a time when the Great Depression was hitting the diocese severely, Bishop William Theodotus Capers "sold" TMI to Bondurant, who sold the school back to the Episcopal Church in 1952. In 1926, Bondurant had merged the Upper School of San Antonio Academy with TMI. Though Bondurant was a Presbyterian, he favored use of the Book of Common Prayer in daily chapel services.

Although Bishop Johnston had, in part, intended the school to train young men for seminaries in the Episcopal Church, the school has always been open to students of any religious faith.

The JROTC, or Corps of Cadets, has been optional for girls since their admission in 1972, and for boys since 1974.

== Campus ==
TMI has moved three times, each time relocating to the edge of an expanding city. The first campus was on Government Hill, next to Fort Sam Houston; the second was in Alamo Heights; and the current campus, dating from 1989, is in far northwest San Antonio, on the edge of the Texas Hill Country. The campus is modern in architecture and built almost entirely from local limestone.

The All Saints' Chapel is a 500-seat modern chapel, used for daily service of Morning Prayer and for Eucharistic services on the first Wednesday of every month as well as for quarterly school Evensongs, choral concerts and the annual baccalaureate Mass. The chapel, designed by alumnus Chris Carson of Ford, Powell & Carson, was recognized as one of the best religious buildings of 2009 by the Interfaith Forum on Religion, Art and Architecture, a knowledge community of the American Institute of Architects. The chapel organ is a two manual, 18 voice Schoenstein & Co. opus.

== Corps of Cadets ==
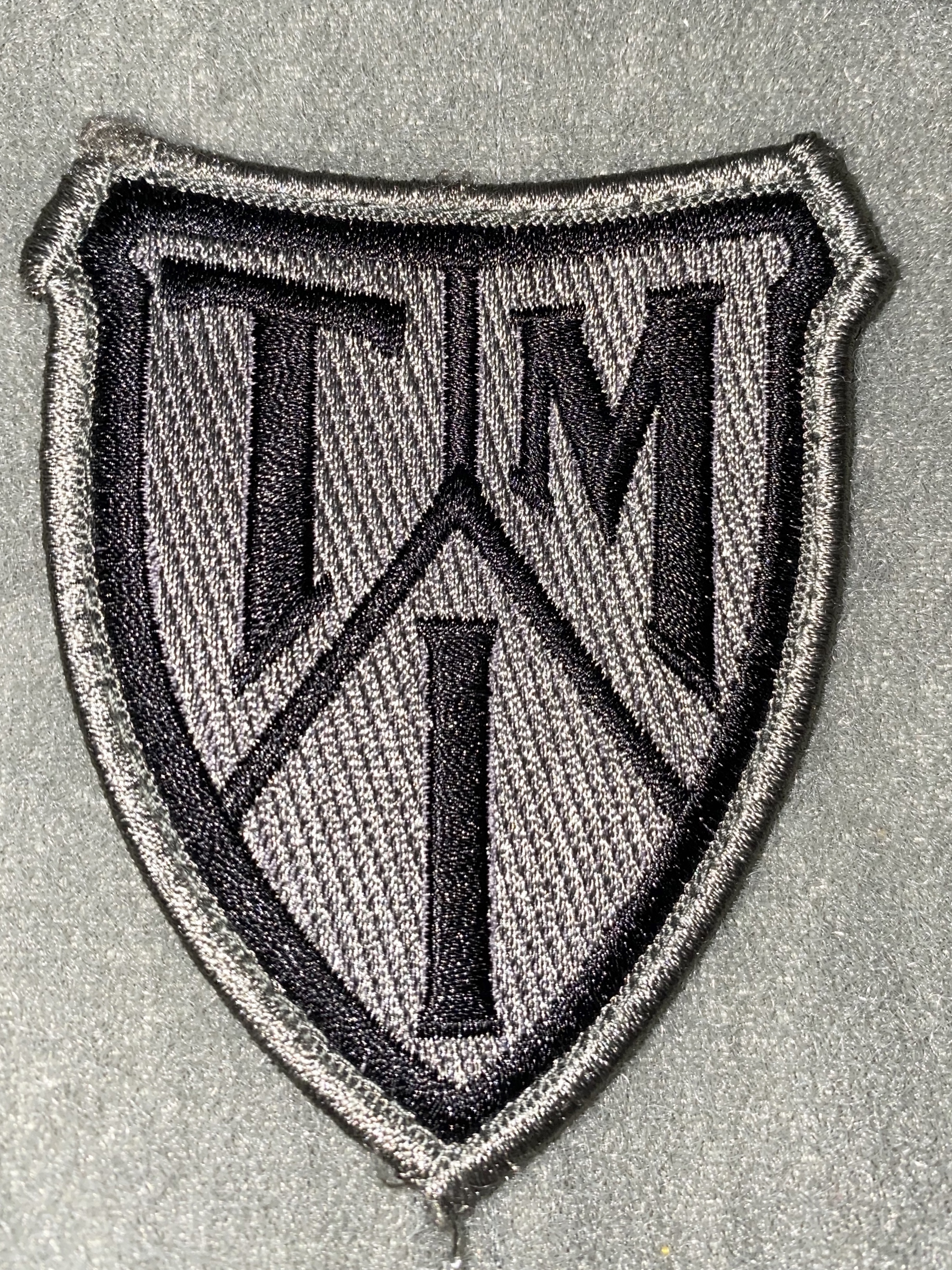
TMI shoulder patch for the digital ACU pattern

Approximately one third of TMI students are members of the Corps of Cadets. The high school leadership program is affiliated with the United States Army's Junior Reserve Officers' Training Corps. The Panther Battalion has also been named as an Honor Unit with Distinction, the highest possible unit award for a school JROTC program, for over a decade. Due to its high ranking, TMI cadets can apply for places at United States Service academies without the congressional recommendation usually required.

== Alumni ==
=== Academia and science ===
- Light Townsend Cummins, historian (did not graduate)
- Cresson Kearny, inventor
- David Scott, astronaut
- Lewis Sorley, historian

=== The arts ===
- Justin Blanchard, actor
- Dan Blocker, actor and producer
- Julian Onderdonk, painter

=== Business and Ranching ===
- James A. Baker Jr., attorney
- Tom Frost, banker and philanthropist

=== The Church ===
- Robert R. Brown, 9th Bishop of Arkansas
- Frank Juhan, Bishop of Florida

=== Government and politics ===
- Jeremy Bernard, gay rights activist
- Henry E. Catto Jr., ambassador
- Maury Maverick Jr., attorney and journalist
- George Berham Parr, politician
- Lamar S. Smith, congressman
- Milton H. West, congressman
- Bob Wheeler, member of Texas House of Representatives

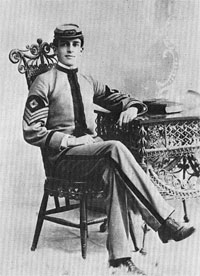
Gen. MacArthur, class of 1897, as a student

=== Military ===
- John B. Coulter, general
- Robert Gard, general
- Ralph E. Haines Jr., general
- Douglas MacArthur, Supreme Commander of the Allied Powers
- Michael L. Oates, general
- John L. Pierce, general

=== Sport ===
- Sherry Blakley, NASCAR driver
- Ross Youngs, baseball player, National Baseball Hall of fame, Class of 1914
- Pato O'Ward, IndyCar driver

== Notable faculty members ==
- Frederick Ahl – Latinist
- Page Morris – Mathematician
- Josef R. Sheetz – General
- Ted Constanzo - Coach

== History of the School Name ==
- 1893 – West Texas Military Academy (WTMA)
- 1926 – Texas Military Institute (WTMA merged with the upper school of San Antonio Academy and the school was renamed Texas Military Institute)
- 2004 – TMI – The Episcopal School of Texas
- 2017 – TMI Episcopal (adopted in November 2017)

== See also ==
- Marine Military Academy
- Peacock Military Academy
