= Stanley F. Hauser =

Bishop of the Episcopal Diocese of West Texas

The Right Reverend Stanley Fillmore Hauser
- Suffragan Bishop of West Texas
- Church: Episcopal Church
- Diocese: West Texas
- Elected: May 8, 1979
- In office: 1979-1987
- Predecessor: Richard Earl Dicus
- Successor: Earl N. McArthur

Orders
- Ordination: September 17, 1945 (deacon); October 10, 1946 (priest) by Everett Holland Jones
- Consecration: August 24, 1979 by John Allin

Personal details
- Born: August 7, 1922 Laredo, Texas, United States
- Died: August 11, 1989 (aged 67) San Antonio, Texas, United States
- Buried: Bishop Jones Diocesan Center, San Antonio
- Denomination: Anglican
- Parents: Stanley Fillmore Hauser & Elizabeth Mary Merriman
- Spouse: Madelyn May Horner (m. 1947)
- Children: 5
- Education: University of the South; Virginia Theological Seminary

Stanley Fillmore Hauser (August 7, 1922 - August 11, 1989) was a suffragan bishop of the Episcopal Diocese of West Texas. He was consecrated on August 4, 1979 in San Antonio, and retired in 1987.

== Early life and education ==
Hauser was born on August 7, 1922, in Laredo, Texas, to Stanley Fillmore Hauser (1891-1940) and Elizabeth Mary Merriman (1891-1991). He was educated at the San Antonio High School and then studied at the University of the South from where he earned a Bachelor of Arts in 1943. He then enrolled at the Virginia Theological Seminary and earned a Bachelor of Divinity in 1946. He married Madelyn May Horner (1924-2021) on June 5, 1947 and together they had five children. He was awarded an honorary Doctor of Divinity from the Virginia Theological Seminary in 1980.

== Ordained ministry ==
Hauser was ordained deacon on September 17, 1945, in St Mark's Church, San Antonio, and priest on October 10, 1946, at Calvary Church in Menard, Texas, by Bishop Everett Holland Jones of West Texas. He was rector of Calvary Church in Menard, Texas, and Minister-in-charge of St James' Church in Fort McKavett, Texas, between 1946 and 1947. He then became rector of St John's Church in Sonora, Texas, and priest-in-charged of Trinity Church in Junction, Texas, from 1947 to 1951. In 1951 he became rector of Zion Church in Charles Town, West Virginia, while in 1960 he became rector of St Mark's Church in Houston, Texas. Between 1968 and 1979, he was the rector of St Mark's Church, San Antonio.

== Bishop ==
On May 8, 1979, Hauser was elected Suffragan Bishop of West Texas on the ninth ballot at a special council meeting. He was consecrated on August 24, 1979, at the San Antonio Convention Center with Presiding Bishop John Allin as chief consecrator. He retained the post until his retirement in 1987.
