= Justin Blanchard =

American actor

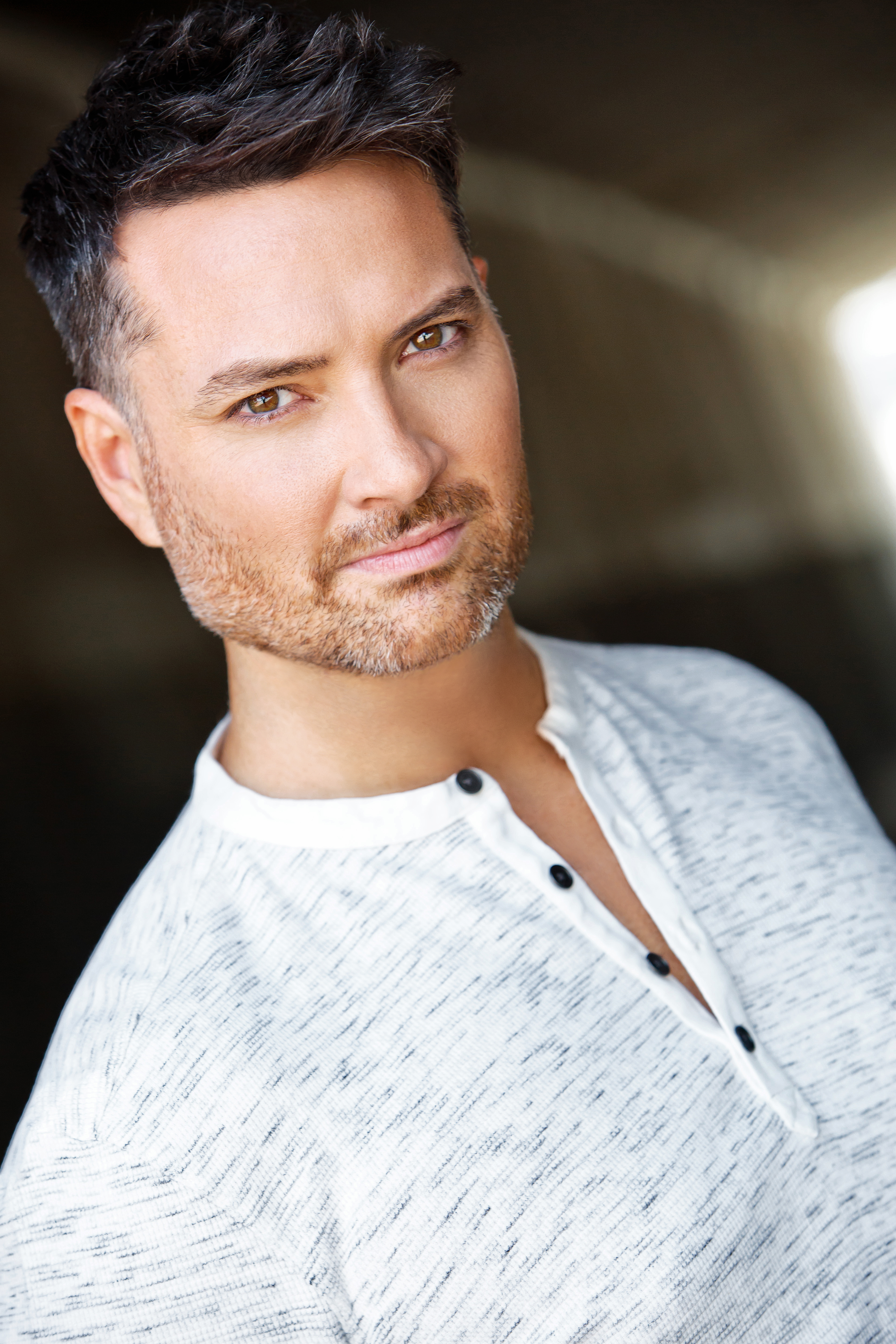
- Born: Justin Wayne Blanchard; San Antonio, Texas, U.S.
- Education: New York University (BFA); Brown University (MFA)
- Occupation: Actor
- Years active: 1998–present
- Website: Official website

Justin Blanchard is an American actor who has performed in television, film, theatre and radio. He is a member of SAG-AFTRA and the Actors' Equity Association.

== Education ==
Blanchard grew up in San Antonio, Texas and resides in Los Angeles, California. He earned his BFA in Drama from New York University's Tisch School of the Arts, training at the CAP21 musical theater program, the Experimental Theatre Wing and the Stonestreet Film and Television Studio. He received his MFA in Acting from Brown University. Blanchard has performed professionally for more than 20 years, and is a member of SAG-AFTRA and the Actors' Equity Association.

Blanchard is an alumnus of Texas Military Institute. He achieved the rank of Lieutenant Colonel as a Company Commander in TMI's Corps of Cadets.

== Career ==
Justin Blanchard has performed in television, film, theatre and radio. Blanchard made his Broadway debut as 2nd Lieutenant Hibbert in Journey's End. Journey's End was Blanchard's first ever audition in New York City.

In television and film, Blanchard has been a Guest Star on Law & Order: Special Victims Unit and co-starred in the PBS special The Mystery of Matter: Marie Curie. Other notable television appearances include All My Children, Guiding Light, and One Life to Live. He appeared in commercials for Oscar De La Renta and the MTV: Safe Sex campaign. In film, he has co-starred in The Middleman (Dir: by Heath Cullens), Over There (Dir: Mark Parees), and Alyssa & Sara (Dir: Josh Wick). He has also done voiceover work for audiobooks such as Romeo and Juliet, A Midsummer Night's Dream, a podcast adaptation of a play by J.M. Barrie, video games and commercials.

Notable theatrical performances include: King of Navarre in Love's Labour's Lost for Commonwealth Shakespeare Company in Boston Common, Hamlet in Hamlet and Henry V in Henry V for New York Classical Theatre (Off-Broadway), and Iachimo in Fiasco Theater's Cymbeline.

ACTING PERFORMANCES
Production	Role	Venue		Notes
Journey's End	2nd LT Hibbert	Broadway	Belasco Theatre	Directed by David Grindley; Tony Award; Drama Desk Award; Outer Critics Circle Award; Drama League Award; New York Drama Critics Circle - Special Citation
Zorba	Nikos	Pre-Broadway	Workshop	David Leveaux - Director
Henry V	Henry V	Off-Broadway	New York Classical Theatre	Directed by Stephen Burdman; Featured production in the 2011 NYC River to River Festival
The Witch of Edmonton	Frank Thorney	Off-Broadway	Red Bull Theater Co.	Directed by Jesse Berger
Macbeth	Malcolm	Off-Broadway	Theatre for a New Audience	Directed by Arin Arbus
Hamlet: Prince of Denmark	Hamlet	Off-Broadway	New York Classical Theatre	Directed by Stephen Burdman; Performed in the World Financial Center
Sense and Sensibility	Willoughby	Regional	Actors Theatre of Louisville	Directed by Jon Jory
Othello	Iago	Regional	Actors Theatre of Louisville	Directed by Bruce Longworth
A Civil War Christmas	Chester	Regional	Long Wharf Theatre	Directed by Tina Landau; Premiere of Paula Vogel's play
Argonautika	Hylas	Regional	Berkeley Repertory Theatre; McCarter Theatre; Shakespeare Theatre Washington D.C.	Premiere directed by Mary Zimmerman
As You Like It	Orlando	Regional	Hangar Theatre	Directed by Kevin Moriarty
Hamlet	Laertes	Regional	Trinity Repertory Company; Shakespeare Festival of St. Louis	Directed (Trinity Rep) by Brian McEleney; Directed (St. Louis Shakespeare) by Bruce Longworth
Law & Order: Special Victims' Unit (Svengali)	Edgar Rabinowicz (a/k/a Agent Mayhem)	Television	NBC	
Mystery of Matter:Marie Curie	Andre DeBierne	Television	PBS	
The Middle Man	Luke	Film	Short	Directed by Heath Cullens; 2007 LA Shorts Festival
Over There	Dominick	Film	Short	Directed by Marc Parees
Cilantro: Robot Wrangler	Cilantro	Film	Short	Directed by Brad Winderbaum
Alyssa & Sara	Aaron	Film	Short	Directed by Josh Wick
