= Gary Lillibridge =

American Episcopal bishop (born 1956)

The Right Reverend Gary R. Lillibridge
- Bishop of West Texas
- Church: Episcopal Church
- Province: Province VII
- Diocese: West Texas
- Elected: October 11, 2003
- In office: 2006-2017
- Predecessor: James E. Folts
- Successor: David M. Reed
- Previous post: Coadjutor Bishop of West Texas (2004–2006)

Orders
- Ordination: June 1982 (deacon); January 1983 (priest)
- Consecration: February 21, 2004 by Frank Griswold

Personal details
- Born: May 2, 1956 (age 70) San Antonio, Texas, United States
- Denomination: Anglicanism
- Spouse: Catherine (m. 1985)
- Children: 3

Gary Richard Lillibridge (born May 2, 1956) is an American Episcopal bishop. He was the ninth bishop of the Episcopal Diocese of West Texas.

== Early life and education ==
Lillibridge was born on May 2, 1956, in San Antonio, Texas, United States. He was raised as an Episcopalian. He studied education at Southwest Texas State University, graduating with a Bachelor of Science (BSc) degree in 1978. He trained for ordination at the Virginia Theological Seminary, and graduated in 1982 with a Master of Divinity (M.Div.) degree.

== Ordained ministry ==
Lillibridge was ordained in the Episcopal Church as a deacon in June 1982 and as a priest in January 1983.

In October 2003, Lillibridge was elected as the ninth Bishop of West Texas. On February 21, 2004, he was consecrated a bishop by Frank Griswold, the then Presiding Bishop of the Episcopal Church. He then served as coadjutor bishop to James E. Folts, the Bishop of the Episcopal Diocese of West Texas. He took up the appointment of diocesan bishop in 2006, upon the retirement of Bishop Folts.

Lillibridge retired from full-time ministry in 2017.

=== Views ===
Lillibridge has been described as a traditionalist and a conservative. However, in April 2015, he granted three parishes in his diocese permission to "conduct same-sex blessings".

== Personal life ==
In 1985, Lillibridge married Catherine DeForrest. Together they have three children: Sarah, Amy, and Thomas.
