= Folts Mission Institute =

Methodist training school in Herkimer, New York

Folts Mission Institute

Folts Mission Institute (later, Folts National Training School; 1893–1927/28) was a Methodist training school for young women for home and foreign Christian mission work. It was founded at Herkimer, New York, November 1893, by George Philo Folts and his wife, Elizabeth Snell Folts. In October 1898, after the death of Elizabeth Folts and to honor her expressed wish, George Folts presented the Institute to the Woman's Foreign Missionary Society of the Methodist Episcopal Church. The gift was accepted by the General Executive Committee; however, the transfer of deeds and property was never made. The Institute remained a private institution, but for several years, it was under the management of the Woman's Foreign Missionary Society. In 1914, the control of the Institute was transferred to the Woman's Home Missionary Society of the Northern New York Conference of the Methodist Episcopal Church. The school ended operations in 1927/28.

== Establishment ==
The Folts Mission Institute was the contribution to the cause of special Christian education of Mr. and Mrs. Folts of Herkimer, New York. The purpose of its founders was the establishment of an institution of high grade for the thorough preparation of young men and young women for the various mission fields of the world, and for other departments of Christian service. It had a sphere distinctly its own, not church, neither academic, collegiate or theological.

Folts Mission Institute was incorporated under the laws of the state of New York on November 17, 1892, and dedicated a year later, November 21, 1893. The corporation formed consisted of Mr. and Mrs. Folts, Hon. Warner Miller, Bishop Edward Gayer Andrews and Rev. W. F. Markham of Northern New York Conference, and a deed was made out to this corporation of all property described as school property.

This launched the pioneer of Methodist Training Schools in the U.S.. The first school year opened September 13, 1893, with Rev. J. L. Davies as its first president, Maria Orme Allen, principal. Among the special lecturers that first year were Bishops Mallalieu, Vincent, Bowman and Thoburn. Among the instructors of those early days were Jennie M. Bingham, Nellie P. Drake, Dr. E. G. Kern, Dr. O. H. Deck and Dr. George Graves.

== Early history ==
The first class was graduated in June, 1895, William Clawson, Duvillo Grant Christman and Miranda Crouche. But the co-educational policy of the school was of brief duration and early abandoned. For the first two years, the courses were general, including some common school branches, Bible, General and Church History, Comparative Religion, Elementary Medicine and similar subjects. In addition to music it had nine departments of study: English Bible, Hebrew, New Testament Greek, Comparative Religions, General History, Church History and History of Missions, Elements of Practical Medicine, Applied Christianity, English Language and Literature. During the past year, a dormitory for men, including reading and recitation rooms, was added. The library had a rapid growth, numbering now about 1,500 volumes. Valuable additions to the library were made by Jennie Bingham, from the library of her father, Dr. Isaac S. Bingham, and by Mina Morgan Palmer from the library of her mother, Julia Amanda Fairchild Morgan. A valuable collection of curios from Bible and missionary lands were added during the year. Apparatus, including a mannequin and models of the eye and ear, were provided for the department of the Elements of Practical Medicine.

In 1896, the courses began to specialize along missionary and theological subjects and included practical teaching in Sunday school. The Board of Trustees was increased to nine members, divided into three groups, each to serve three years. Conference visitors from the Northern New York and Central New York and Genesee Conferences were appointed. Two were graduated that year, Mary Ann Foster of Nova Scotia, Ida Blanchard of Maine. The foreign missionary fields now received the graduates, Miranda Crouche going to North China, Mary Ann Foster to Western China and Mr. and Mrs. Griffith to South America. To the home field went Mr. and Mrs. Clawson to the St. Regis Indian Mission, New York. Dr. R. H. Walker, later of Ohio Wesleyan University, was teacher of applied Christianity. Standards for entrance were now required and applicants were required to either present certificates or diplomas of a completed academic course or give evidence of being fully competent to do the work in a satisfactory manner. Conditions for graduation were required, eighteen majors together with one year's attendance upon medical lectures and in the singing class for one hour per week. Bookkeeping and Church Kindergarten work were under consideration as a part of the curriculum. The following year lecture work and normal kindergarten training were introduced. The faculty was increased in number and the list of special lecturers grew. The latter included Professor George Edgar Vincent, Rev. A. B. Leonard, Professor Ella A. Boole, Woman's Christian Temperance Union (W.C.T.U.). That year, Ida Alice Blanchard went to the Watts de Peyster Industrial School and Ida May Bowne to Rome, Italy.

Practical work during the week and Sunday was introduced. Evangelistic and street meetings were frequently held. The subjects of study were divided into Departments and Courses. Under Departments were five Courses: Pedagogy, Kindergarten of the Church, Deaconess and Sunday School Teachers' Course; Stenography and Typewriting were taught by a student. Psychology, Sociology, Homiletics, Economics and similar subjects were placed in the curriculum. Small classes continued to graduate and graduates went to home and foreign fields.

Two important events in the history of Folts took place during the month of October, 1898. On October 3 occurred the death of Elizabeth Folts. In her study of foreign missions, she found no provision had been made for the preparation of young women so sorely needed for the foreign missionary field and this discovery became her inspiration and the birth of Folts Mission Institute. Two weeks after the death of Elizabeth Folts, her husband presented the Institute to the Woman's Foreign Missionary Society of the Methodist Episcopal Church through the New York Branch, then holding its annual meeting in Herkimer. On October 29, the gift was accepted as a sacred trust by the General Executive Committee at its session in Indianapolis, Indiana. However, the transfer of deeds and property was never made and Folts Mission Institute remained a private institution, but for several years the school was under the management of the Woman's Foreign Missionary Society.

Dr. R. H. Walker resigned as teacher at the end of the year 1898.

== Growth (1900-1910) ==
The Board of Trustees in 1901 numbered twelve members, divided into three groups of four each, to serve three years. Bishop Andrews still served as president of the board. The graduates entering the home field numbered seven, those having gone to the foreign field were nineteen. Better and closer organization of the school work is observed. In 1903-4, Mary Swail Wilkinson became president of the school. Bingham was teacher of the Bible and among the lecturers, there were many notables of the church. Lectures on Religious Pedagogy were made possible by the generosity of Mrs. Ira Dewane Brainard, a member of the board of directors, the name having been changed from that of Trustees. Bingham gave a series of Art Lectures on the Ministry of Art, Beginnings of Christian Art and the Masterpieces of Art. Two distinct departments now took form—the Bible Department and the Kindergarten Department. The school year was divided into two semesters of eighteen weeks each. The attention of college women was directed to Folts Mission Institute. The students were asked to bring with them an American Standard revised version of the Bible. Manual training for church and settlement work, cooking, sewing, basketry, bent iron work, whittling and physical culture were the new subjects that found a place in the curriculum.

In 1906-7, Mrs. A. E. Sanford was president. The 1905, the graduating class numbered 12 and Dr. Charles E. Hamilton, later president of Cazenovia Seminary, gave the commencement address. Mrs. F. W. Cristman was medical lecturer during this year. The foreign missionaries having gone abroad numbered 31 and represented China, Japan, Korea, India, Mexico, South America and Bulgaria. Home fields were still supplied by Folts students.

In 1907-8, Ida V. Shontz was president and Mary E. Moore became field secretary. Among the lecturers were included Bishops McDowell, Berry, and Burt. Dr. William F. Anderson, later Bishop Anderson, gave the commencement address. The foreign field claimed 44 graduates and the home field 24.

In 1909-10, the Board of Directors was increased in number to 18 and Bishop Goodsell became president. Dr. Richard Evans served as president of the school. During the years of 1909-10, there were 30 graduates in all departments.

From the first year, there began the nucleus of a library to which additions were made from year to year. By 1914, there were nearly 5,000 volumes. Also a fine collection of curios from Japan, loaned by David S. Spencer and which was supplemented by curios from other lands, donated by missionaries and students. Student prayer meetings began.

== Death of George Folts (1911) ==
George Folts died in November 1911. With his death came a decline of the school. Dr. Evans left at the close of the school year and was followed by Dr. Townsend, a pastor of Northern New York Conference and who served as president for nearly two years. There was no money, student enrollment was small. Standards of entrance were removed, courses became confused, property and equipment depreciated, responsibility was lodged nowhere, financial aid could not be found. The foundations were wanting.

When Bishop Berry retired from the Buffalo, New York area, he bequeathed to Bishop Burt, his successor, what he called a "sinking ship.” The board of directors, with Bishop Burt as president, set about to rescue the school and approached the Woman's Home Missionary Society of the Methodist Episcopal Church on the subject of taking over the property, management and control of the school. The society, at this time, was itself financially embarrassed and three times refused to consider the proposition, but eventually yielded and with conditions, permitted the school to become the property of the Northern New York Conference Woman's Home Missionary Society, until such time as the national society could take control.

== Transfer to the Woman's Home Missionary Society (1914) ==
On June 18, 1914, the control of Folts Mission Institute was transferred through its board of directors to the Woman's Home Missionary Society of the Northern New York Conference of the Methodist Episcopal Church. The property, with bonds and securities, was valued at US$250,000. On October 20, 1917, by action taken at the annual meeting of the Board of Managers of the Woman's Home Missionary Society of the Methodist Episcopal Church, Folts Mission Institute was made a national training school of that Society, beginning with August 1, 1918. Gifts, bequests, and annuities received were passed through the regular channels and credited to the donors and churches in the columns of reports assigned to the Woman's Home Missionary Society.

Folts Mission Institute ceased to be an independent training school, and became one of the many regular institutions of the Methodist Episcopal Church. Its purpose was to give a good, strong, practical and adequate training to young women for Christian work in city, home and foreign mission fields.

On September 1, 1914, Bertha Fowler, A. M, became president. The property was kept in repair and equipment added as addition was possible. The time for such a venture was most inopportune -just at the beginning of the World War- when attention was directed otherwise than on things educational and missionary, when money was commandeered for war purposes and outside pursuits were made attractive to young women.

== Folts National Training School (1918) ==
In 1918, when Folts Mission Institute became a national training school, it seemed to take on new life. That meant more support, wider advertising, more students, better recognition as a school. Folts now began to set the pace for other training schools and in its slow but sure process of growth, it became the inspiration of other schools of like character. The faculty was always of collegiate quality, gradually the text books were changed to that of college requirement, and the methods of teaching became the methods adopted by colleges. Requirements for entrance became more rigid so that the lowest grade of acceptance was that of high school graduation.

In the following eight years, there were 47 graduates. This did not include many who had been in attendance for a brief period of a semester or a year, and had withdrawn. Of the 47 graduates, five were deaconesses, nine were married, three are employed by churches, three were preparing to go as foreign missionaries, one became a nurse, two were pastors under regular appointment, the whereabouts of three were unknown, one was in government employ, two were directors of religious education, two were teachers in Folts Mission Institute, and 18 were in the employ of the Woman's Home Missionary Society, holding responsible positions from Puerto Rico to San Francisco and from Buffalo to New Orleans.

From one building at the beginning of the eight years, the school grew to occupying three. From a faculty of five the first year, the faculty grew to nine. From two courses the first year, there were now six. From US$8,000 the first year, the yearly budget grew to US$20,000. Crowded as it was for public rooms in which to house the vocational work, the school sought larger and better quarters. At the death of George Folts, the Folts residence became the property of the Folts Mission Institute and came into school use. Every inch of space was pressed into service but even so the congestion increased with the growth of the work.

In January 1922, at the annual meeting of the board of directors, it was decided to purchase the adjoining property on which an option had been held for a year. Possession was taken August 1, 1922, and necessary renovation and repairs were immediately commenced. When school opened on September 6, the building ready for ready for use. It was dedicated on September 29, 1922, Mary Haven Thirkield, president of the Woman's Home Missionary Society, being the speaker and the dedicatory prayer offered by Rev. E. H. Joy, D. D., District Superintendent. It housed the library and all the vocational activities, manual training, cooking, sewing and the Business Department. A new acquisition was that of an infirmary for the use of students when ill. A legacy of Florence Caswell Pelton made to the Ilion auxiliary of the Woman's Home Missionary Society came to the school and formed the nucleus of Pelton Hospital, which solved the issue as to where and how to care for the school's sick.

That year, extensive repairs were made on the school buildings to put them into good condition. The cottages at the rear were in need to paint. The alumni provided for the cost of decorating and furnishing the student parlor. A room in the basement was electric-lighted and furnished with six work benches and tools for the manual training work and the service of the public school manual training teacher was secured. The State Board of Education of New York and Pennsylvania gave credits for work done at Folts Institute, while Boston University allowed fifteen credits of work of the course. Folts needed a larger and more modern kindergarten room, a gymnasium, more room for the library of more than 4,000 volumes, and more room for the increasing student body. The local board of directors urged the purchase of property adjoining the institute, and offered at US$17,000.

== Closure ==
The school ended operations in 1927 or 1928.

In 1943, the building was repurposed as the Folts Home for the Aged, and is currently the Foltsbrook Nursing & Rehabilitation Center.

== See also ==
- List of defunct colleges and universities in New York

== Notable people ==
- Edward Gayer Andrews
- Joseph Flintoft Berry
- Jennie M. Bingham
- Ella A. Boole
- William Fraser McDowell
- Warner Miller
- George Edgar Vincent
