= Josef R. Sheetz =

United States Army general (1895–1992)

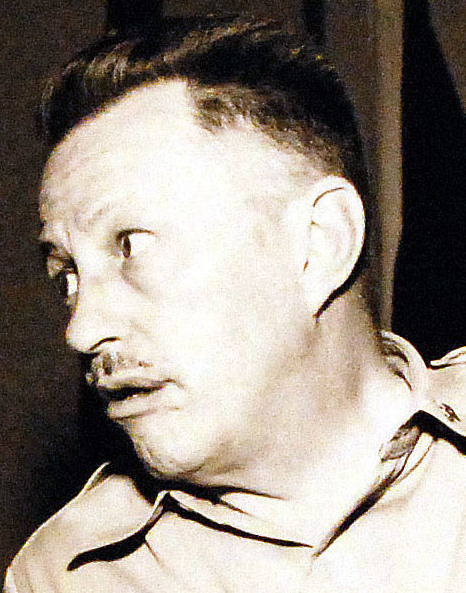
- Josef R. Sheetz in 1950.
- Born: November 20, 1895; Williamsport, Maryland, United States
- Died: January 28, 1992 (aged 96)
- Military career
- Allegiance: United States of America
- Branch: United States Army
- Service years: 1914–1950
- Rank: Major General
- Service number: 0-9720
- Unit: Field Artillery Branch
- Conflicts: World War I; World War II

Major General Josef Robert Sheetz (1895–1992) was an American military commander during World War II, who served as Assistant Chief of Staff of the War Department in 1941–42. Sheetz is particularly noted for his command of the 98th Artillery Division in the Battle of Okinawa, and his involvement in the early years of the post-war American Occupation of Okinawa.

== Career ==
Sheetz taught at the CGSC in Fort Leavenworth, Kansas from 1939 to 1941, before moving on to become Assistant Chief of Staff in the United States Department of War.

During World War II, then Brigadier-General Sheetz served as the commanding officer of the 98th Artillery Division, and fought in the battle of Okinawa as commander of the 24th Artillery Corps.

In October 1949, following a period of service in Korea, Sheetz replaced Major-General William W. Eagles as military governor of Okinawa, and began a number of efforts to revive and repair the islands' economy, and to democratize the government. This was the first concerted effort in four years to repair the damage to the island and its economy caused by the 1945 battle. Efforts were made to improve living conditions for the American soldiers, whose residences were compared by TIME Magazine at the time to hobo camps, as well as to improve morale, and to put an end to crimes committed by the troops. As part of a series of courses aimed at improving conduct among the troops, Sheetz asked Occupation forces to see themselves as diplomats. Expenses involved in the construction of the Occupation forces' military complexes was hoped to aid the local economy, though, after disagreements with local landowners over the cost of the land, the United States Military Government of the Ryukyu Islands simply appropriated the land without compensation. Sheetz also oversaw other reconstruction efforts, including that of the port of Naha. While the Ryukyu Islands would remain under American military rule until 1972, free elections were held for the legislature, and for leaders of several island groups, including Amami, Okinawa, Yaeyama, and Miyako.

Sheetz retired from military service the following year, in 1950. In 1954, he served as headmaster of Texas Military Institute.
