= Robert W. B. Elliott =

American bishop

The Right Reverend Robert Woodward Barnwell Elliott
- Missionary Bishop of Western Texas
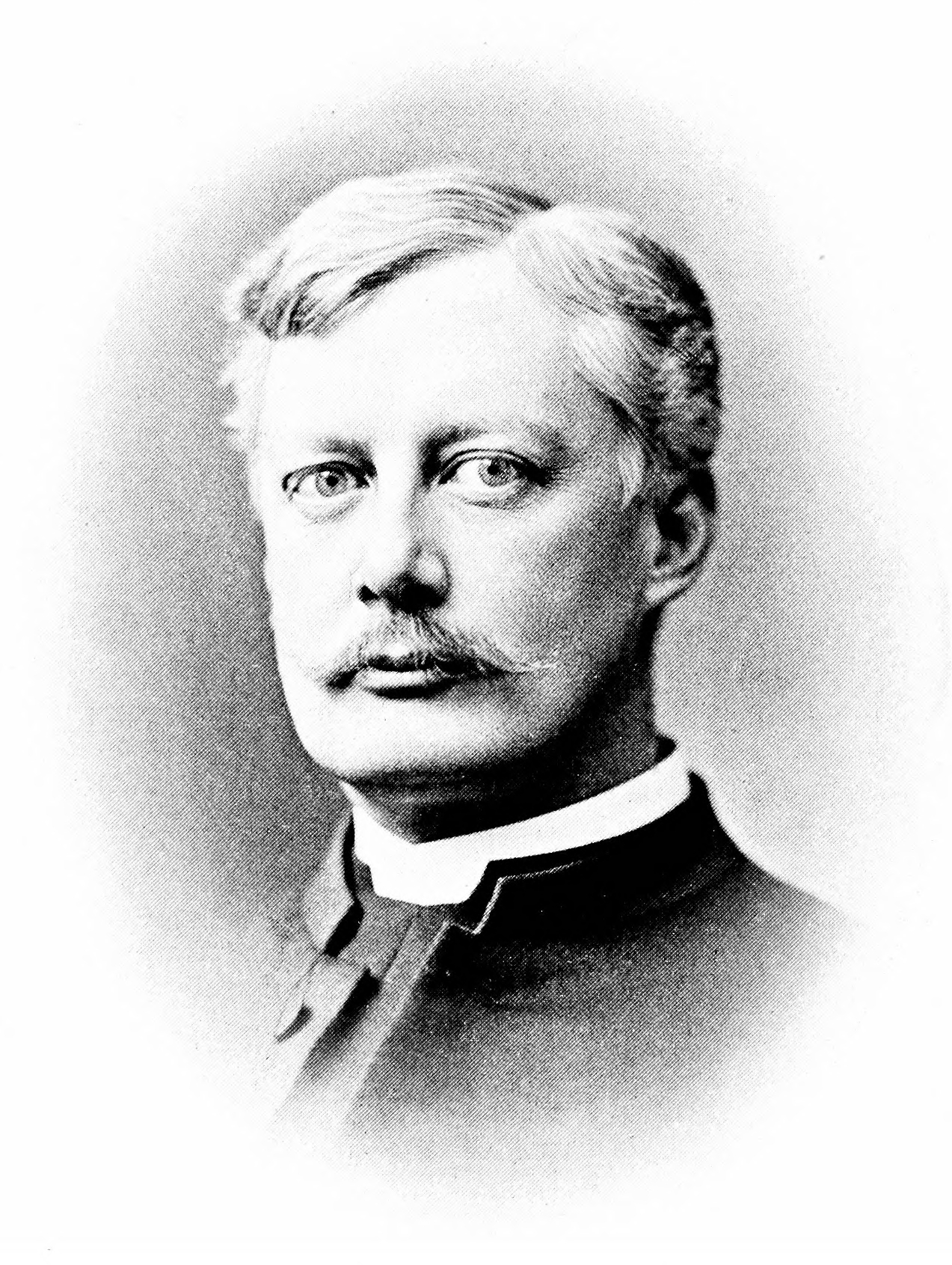
- Church: Episcopal Church
- See: Western Texas
- Elected: 1874
- In office: 1874–1887
- Successor: James S. Johnston

Orders
- Ordination: April 9, 1871 by John W. Beckwith
- Consecration: November 15, 1874 by Alexander Gregg

Personal details
- Born: August 16, 1840 Beaufort, South Carolina, United States
- Died: August 26, 1887 (aged 47) Sewanee, Tennessee
- Denomination: Anglican
- Parents: Stephen Elliott & Charlotte Bull Barnwell
- Spouse: Caroline Pinckney Elliott (m. 1864)
- Children: 6
- Education: South Carolina College

Robert Woodward Barnwell Elliott (August 16, 1840 – August 26, 1887) was the first Missionary Bishop (1874–1887) of what was then the Missionary District of Western Texas in the Episcopal Church.

== Family and Early Life ==
Elliott was born on August 16, 1840, in Beaufort, South Carolina, to Stephen Elliott and Charlotte Bull Barnwell. The Elliotts were an old Low Country family and members of "the Chivalry." His father was the Bishop of Georgia when the Civil War broke out, then served as the first and only Presiding Bishop of the Protestant Episcopal Church in the Confederate States of America. Stephen Elliott was a founder of the University of the South at Sewanee, Tennessee, and had founded the Montpelier Female Institute in Georgia in the 1840s. His father's ancestors originated from Cornwall, England, and arrived in the Province of Carolina in 1690, while his mother's ancestors came from County Meath in what was then the Kingdom of Ireland in 1689. The Southern novelist Sarah Barnwell Elliott (1848-1928) was Robert's sister. Elliott married his third cousin Caroline Elliott on January 7, 1864, and they had five children.

He studied at the South Carolina College and graduated in 1861. Later he enlisted in the Confederate States Army and was made an aide to Alexander Lawton. He was wounded during the Second Battle of Bull Run and was accompanying Joseph E. Johnston at the time of his surrender in May 1865.

== Ordained ministry ==
After the war he settled in Rome, Georgia, where he studied for the priesthood and where he was ordained deacon on August 4, 1868, in St Peter's Church by Bishop Charles Todd Quintard of Tennessee. Between August 1, 1868, and September 1870 he was in charge of the missions in Cave Spring, Centerville, Dalton, and Kingston. He was then appointed assistant minister at the Church of the Incarnation in New York City in November 1870. While there, he also attended the General Theological Seminary. He was then ordained a priest on April 9, 1871, at Christ Church in Savannah, Georgia, by Bishop John W. Beckwith of Georgia. In May 1871, he transferred to the Chapel of the Reconciliation in New York City and remained there until September of that same year. In October 1871 he was then made rector of St Philip's Church in Atlanta, Georgia.

== Episcopacy and legacy ==
In 1874, Elliott was elected by the House of Bishops to be the first Missionary Bishop of Western Texas. He was consecrated bishop on November 15, 1874, by Bishop Alexander Gregg of Texas. He remained in office until his death on August 26, 1887. Elliott was the founder of St. Mary's Hall in San Antonio, Texas (1879), an institution once closely affiliated with the Episcopal Church. The Bishop Elliott Society in the Diocese of West Texas is named in his honor.
