= Robert B. Hibbs =

The Right Reverend Robert Boyd Hibbs
- Suffragan Bishop of West Texas
- Church: Episcopal Church
- Diocese: West Texas
- Elected: September 9, 1995
- In office: 1996-2003
- Predecessor: Earl N. McArthur
- Successor: David M. Reed

Orders
- Ordination: December 21, 1957 by Oliver J. Hart
- Consecration: January 6, 1996 by Edmond L. Browning

Personal details
- Born: April 20, 1932 Philadelphia, Pennsylvania, United States
- Died: April 17, 2017 (aged 84) San Antonio, Texas, United States
- Denomination: Anglican
- Spouse: Nancy Joane Alexander (m. 1957)
- Children: 3

Robert Boyd Hibbs (April 20, 1932 – April 17, 2017) was suffragan bishop of the Episcopal Diocese of West Texas between 1995 and 2003.

== Early life and education ==
Hibbs was born on April 20, 1932, in Philadelphia and was baptized on April 30, 1933. He studied at, and graduated from Trinity College with a Bachelor of Arts. Later he attended the General Theological Seminary and graduated in 1957 with a Bachelor of Sacred Theology.

== Ordained ministry ==
Hibbs was ordained to the diaconate on June 1, 1957, by Bishop W. Blair Roberts, and to the priesthood on December 21, 1957, by Bishop Oliver J. Hart of Pennsylvania. Later he moved to Canada and completed postgraduate studies in Toronto. Afterwards he commenced missionary work in the Philippines and served on the faculty of St Andrew’s Theological Seminary in Quezon City. After his return to the United States in 1972, he became vicar of St Peter's Church in Borger, Texas, until 1975 when he accepted the post of rector of St Stephen's Church in Lubbock, Texas. He taught at the Seminary of the Southwest between 1980 and 1983, before becoming rector of St Barnabas' Church in Fredericksburg, Texas. In 1988, he became assistant rector at the Church of the Good Shepherd in Corpus Christi, Texas.

== Bishop ==
Hibbs was elected Suffragan Bishop of West Texas on September 9, 1995, on the third ballot and consecrated on January 6, 1996, at the First United Methodist Church in Corpus Christi, Texas, by Presiding Bishop Edmond L. Browning. He retired in December 2003 and died in San Antonio on April 17, 2017. He married Nancy Joane Alexander on August 24, 1957, and together had three children.
