= Sarah Barnwell Elliott =

American novelist

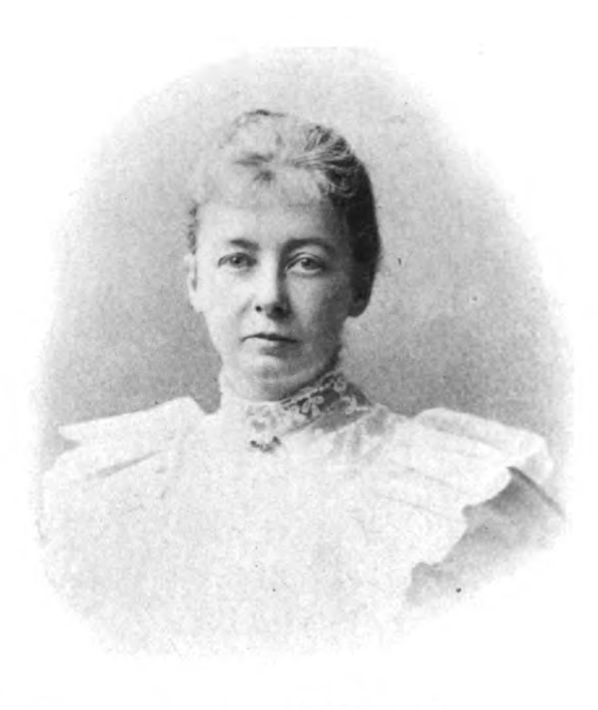
Sarah Barnwell Elliott

Sarah Barnwell Elliott (November 29, 1848 – August 30, 1928) was an American novelist, short story writer, and an advocate of women's rights.

Elliott was born in Montpelier, Georgia, to Stephen Elliott a bishop in the Episcopal Church who was the founder of the Montpelier Female Institute and later one of the founders of the University of the South at Sewanee, Tennessee. Her brother Robert Woodward Barnwell Elliott was the first Bishop of the Missionary Jurisdiction of Western Texas, Protestant Episcopal Church in the United States. She received private tutoring and attended classes at Johns Hopkins University in 1886. She moved to Sewanee in 1871 and other than living in New York City from 1895 to 1902, she was on the Mountain the remainder of her life. Her novels included The Felmeres (1879), A Simple Heart (1887), Jerry (1891), and The Making of Jane (1901). Elliott became active in the women's suffrage movement and served as president of the Tennessee Equal Suffrage Association from 1912-1914. She died in 1928.

== Bibliography ==
=== Novels ===
- The Felmeres (1879)
- A Simple Heart (1887)
- Jerry (1891)
- John Paget (1893)
- The Durket Sperret (1898)
- The Making of Jane (1901)

=== Non-fiction ===
- Sam Houston (1900)

=== Short stories ===
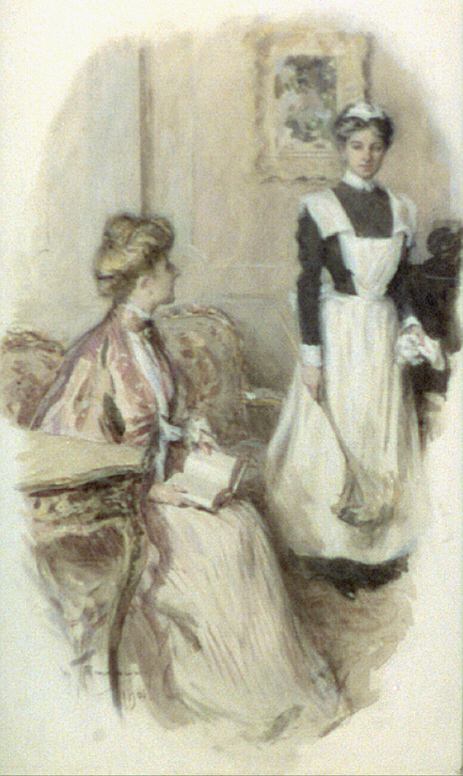
"I should like to make my own living", published in Hybrid Roses, Harper's Magazine, 113:443 (August 1906)

- After long years Youth's Companion (April 23, 1903)
- As a Little Child Independent December 8, 1887)
- Baldy Harper's Magazine (February 1899)
- Beside Still Waters Youth's Companion (August 9, 1900)
- An Ex-Brigadier Harper's Magazine (May 1890)
- Faith and Faithfulness Harper's Magazine (October 1896)
- Florentine Idyl Independent (February 2, 1888)
- Hands All Round Book News (September 1898)
- The Heart of It "Some Data and Other Stories of Southern Life" (1981)
- Hybrid Roses Harper's Magazine (August 1906)
- An Idle Man Independent (June 9, 1887)
- An Incident Harper's Magazine (February 1898)
- Jack Watson—A Character Study Current (September 11, 1886)
- Jim’s Victory Book News (October 1897)
- The Last Flash Scribner's Magazine (June 1915)
- A Little Child Shall Lead Them Youth's Companion (December 18, 1902)
- Miss Ann’s Victory Harper's Bazaar (April 9, 1898)
- Miss Eliza Independent (March 24, 1887)
- Miss Maria’s Revival Harper's Magazine (August 1896)
- Mrs. Gallyhaw’s Candy-stew Louisville Courier-Journal (January–February 1887). This was a short story published in five weekly installments.
- Old Mrs. Dally’s Lesson Youth's Companion (December 29, 1904)
- The Opening of the Southwestern Door Youth's Companion (February 28, 1907)
- Progress McClure's Magazine (November 1899)
- Readjustments Harper's Magazine (May 1910)
- Some Remnants Youth's Companion (April 18, 1901)
- Squire Kayley’s Conclusions Scribner's Magazine (December 1897)
- Stephen’s Margaret Independent (July 5, 1888)
- Study of Song in Florence Harper's Magazine (March 1902)
- What Polly Knew Smart Set (February 1903)
- Without the Courts Harper's Magazine (March 1899)
- The Wreck Youth's Companion (December 19, 1907)

=== Essays ===
- Ibsen Sewanee Review (January 1907)
- A Race That Lives in Mountain Coves Ladies’ Home Journal (September 1898)
- Spirit of the Nineteenth Century in Fiction Outlook (January 19, 1901)
- A Study of Woman and Civilization Forensic Quarterly Review (February 1910)

== Sources ==
- Sandra L. Ballard, Patricia L. Hudson - Listen Here: Women Writing in Appalachia
