= William Theodotus Capers =

American Anglican bishop (1867–1943)

The Right Reverend William Theodotus Capers
- Bishop of West Texas
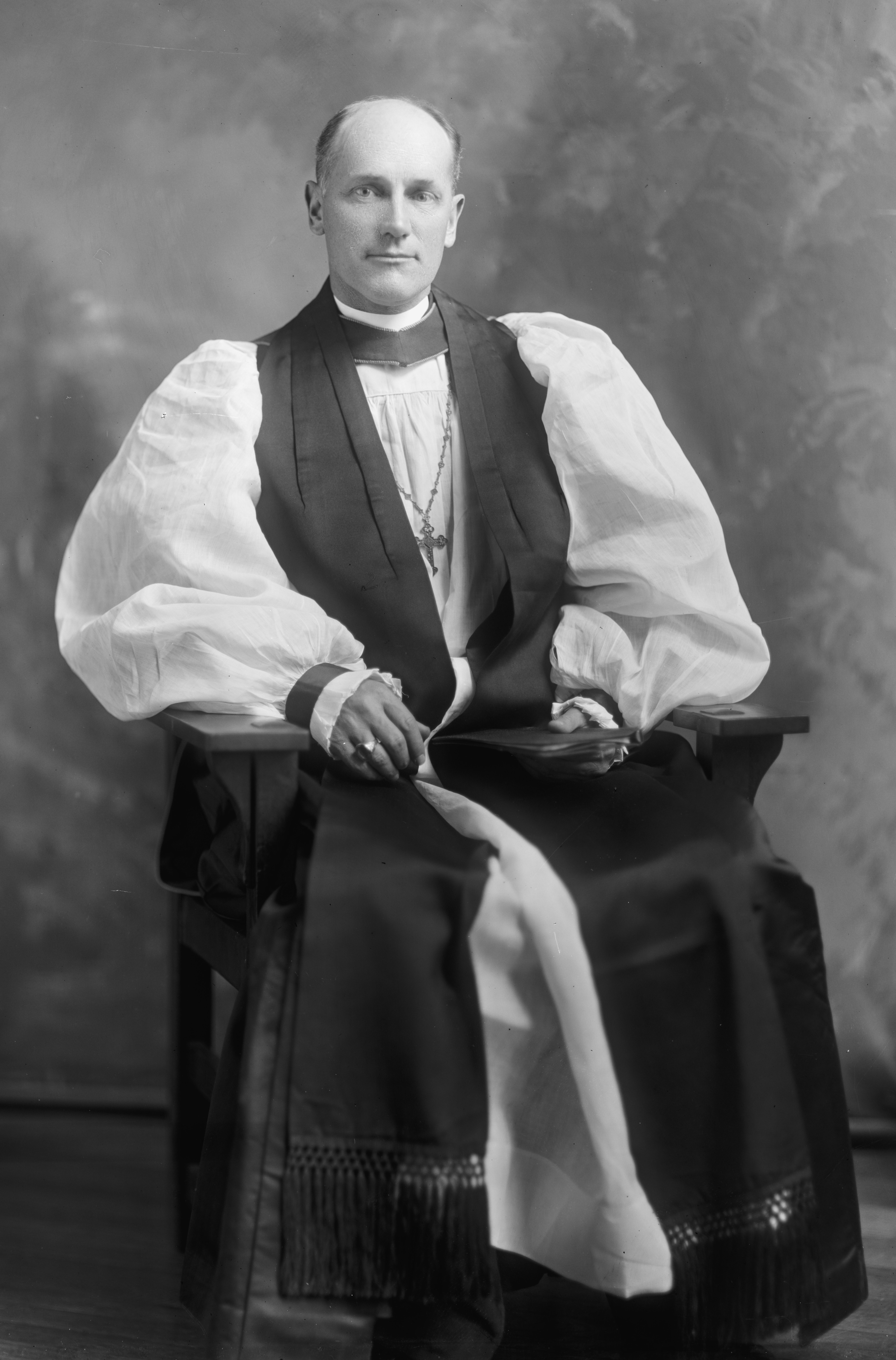
- Photograph of Capers by Harris & Ewing
- Church: Episcopal Church
- Diocese: West Texas
- Elected: November 19, 1913
- In office: 1916-1943
- Predecessor: James S. Johnston
- Successor: Everett Holland Jones
- Previous post: Coadjutor Bishop of West Texas (1914-1916)

Orders
- Ordination: June 29, 1894 (deacon); May 12, 1895 (priest) by Ellison Capers
- Consecration: May 1, 1914 by Daniel S. Tuttle

Personal details
- Born: August 9, 1867 Greenville, South Carolina, United States
- Died: March 29, 1943 (aged 75) San Antonio, Texas, United States
- Buried: Mission Burial Park, San Antonio
- Denomination: Anglican
- Parents: Ellison Capers & Charlotte Rebecca Palmer
- Spouse: Rebecca Holt Bryan (m. 1889; died 1931) Louis Cash Myers (m. 1936)
- Children: 3

William Theodotus Capers (August 9, 1867 – March 29, 1943) was bishop of the Diocese of West Texas in the Episcopal Church in the United States from 1916 until his death.

== Early life and education ==
Capers was born on August 9, 1867, in Greenville, South Carolina, the son of Confederate General, and later Bishop of South Carolina, Ellison Capers and his wife Charlotte Rebecca Palmer. He is the grandson of Bishop of the Methodist Episcopal Church, South William Capers. He studied at South Carolina College between 1885 and 1886, and later at Furman University from 1886 until his graduation 1887. He also trained for the priesthood at the Virginia Theological Seminary and graduated in 1894. He also earned his Master of Arts from the Kentucky State University in 1911. He was awarded an honorary Doctor of Divinity from the University of the South and another from the Virginia Theological Seminary, both in 1914.

== Ordained ministry ==
Capers was ordained deacon on June 29, 1894, in the chapel of the Virginia Seminary, and advanced to the priesthood on May 12, 1895 on both occasions by his father Bishop Ellison Capers. He served as rector of Grace Church in Anderson, South Carolina, between 1895 and 1901; Holy Trinity Church in Vicksburg, Mississippi, between 1901 and 1903; Trinity Church in Asheville, North Carolina, from 1903 until 1905; Dean of Christ Church Cathedral in Lexington, Kentucky, between 1905 and 1912; and then rector of the Church of the Holy Apostles in Philadelphia from 1912 until 1913.

== Episcopacy ==
On November 19, 1913, Capers was elected on the first ballot as Coadjutor Bishop of West Texas during a special session of the council held in St Mark's Church, San Antonio. He was then consecrated on May 1, 1914, at St Mark's by Presiding Bishop Daniel S. Tuttle. He succeeded as diocesan in 1916 and remained in office until his death on March 29, 1943. He had been hospitalized for a week at Santa Rosa Hospital in San Antonio where he died.
