= John H. MacNaughton =

American bishop (1929–2022)

The Right Reverend John H. MacNaughton
- Bishop of West Texas
- Church: Episcopal Church
- Diocese: West Texas
- Elected: 1985
- In office: 1987-1995
- Predecessor: Scott Bailey
- Successor: James E. Folts
- Previous post: Coadjutor Bishop of West Texas (1986-1987)

Orders
- Ordination: June 20, 1954 (deacon); February 1955 (priest) by Stephen Keeler
- Consecration: February 6, 1986 by Edmond L. Browning

Personal details
- Born: November 19, 1929 Duluth, Minnesota, United States
- Died: February 28, 2022 (aged 92) San Antonio, Texas, United States
- Denomination: Anglican
- Spouse: Shirley Ross (m. 1954)
- Children: 5

John Herbert MacNaughton (November 19, 1929 – February 28, 2022) was bishop of the Episcopal Diocese of West Texas from 1987 to 1995.

== Biography ==
MacNaughton was born on November 19, 1929, in Duluth, Minnesota, to Canadian parents. He attended Bexley Hall from where he graduated in 1954. He was ordained deacon on June 20, 1954 in St Paul's Church, Duluth, Minnesota by Bishop Stephen Keeler of Minnesota. He was ordained priest in February 1955. He was initially rector of Holy Trinity Church in International Falls, Minnesota and St Peter's Church in Warroad, Minnesota, and in 1958 he was appointed Dean of the Cathedral of Our Merciful Saviour in Faribault, Minnesota. He remained there until 1967 when he became rector of Trinity Church in Excelsior, Minnesota. He also served in Edina, Minnesota. In 1969, he managed to establish a telephone counseling service in Minneapolis which catered for young people experiencing problems with drug abuse. He was also instrumental in bringing the Palmer Drug Abuse Program (PDAP) to San Antonio in 1977. He became rector of Christ Church in San Antonio in 1975, a position he held until becoming Bishop of West Texas in 1986.

MacNaughton was elected Coadjutor Bishop of West Texas in 1985 and was consecrated on February 6, 1986, at the Bayfront Convention Center in Corpus Christi, Texas, by Presiding Bishop Edmond L. Browning; this was the first episcopal consecration Browning had presided at. He became diocesan bishop in 1987 upon Scott Bailey's retirement. MacNaughton retired on December 31, 1995.

MacNaughton died in San Antonio on February 28, 2022, at the age of 92, following a stroke. He was married to Shirley Ross MacNaughton, whom he married in 1954, and together had five children.
