= David M. Reed =

American bishop

The Right Reverend David Mitchell Reed
- Bishop of West Texas
- Church: Episcopal Church
- Diocese: West Texas
- Elected: October 25, 2014
- In office: 2017-2023
- Predecessor: Gary Lillibridge
- Successor: David G. Read
- Previous posts: Suffragan Bishop of West Texas (2006-2014); Coadjutor Bishop of West Texas (2014-2017)

Orders
- Ordination: January 13, 1984 by Scott Bailey
- Consecration: August 26, 2006 by D. Bruce MacPherson

Personal details
- Born: March 9, 1957 (age 69) Brownsville, Texas, United States
- Denomination: Anglican
- Spouse: Patricia Ann Kopec (m. 1988)
- Children: 2

David Mitchell Reed (born March 9, 1957) is the retired tenth diocesan bishop, and formerly suffragan bishop, of the Episcopal Diocese of West Texas.

== Early life and education ==
Reed was born on March 9, 1957, in Brownsville, Texas, the son of William Wesley Reed, Jr. and Olive Helen Polley. He was educated at the Episcopal Day School in Brownsville and later at Homer Hanna High School, from where he graduated in 1975. He later studied at the University of Texas at Austin and earned a Bachelor of Journalism in 1978 and then taught in a school for two years. After two years, he enrolled at the Seminary of the Southwest and studied for the ordained ministry, graduating in 1983 with a Master of Divinity.

== Ordained ministry ==
Reed was ordained deacon on June 12, 1983, at the Church of the Advent in Brownsville, by the Suffragan Bishop of West Texas Stanley F. Hauser. He was then ordained a priest on January 13, 1984, by Bishop Scott Field Bailey at St Alban’s Church in Harlingen, Texas. He initially served as assistant rector of St Alban’s Church in Harlingen between 1983 and 1987, until he became rector of St Francis Church in Victoria, Texas, in 1987. He remained there until 1994 when he returned to St Alban’s Church, this time as its rector. He married Patricia Ann Kopec on June 18, 1988, and together they have two children.

== Bishop ==
Reed was elected Suffragan Bishop of West Texas on March 25, 2006, during a special council. He was consecrated on August 26, 2006, with the Bishop of Western Louisiana D. Bruce MacPherson as chief consecrator. On October 25, 2014, Reed was elected as Coadjutor Bishop of West Texas and was invested as diocesan bishop on June 3, 2017.

In April 2022, Reed announced his plan to retire from his role as diocesan bishop in late 2023.

== See also ==
- List of Episcopal bishops of the United States
- Historical list of the Episcopal bishops of the United States
