= Jennie M. Bingham =

American author and litterateur

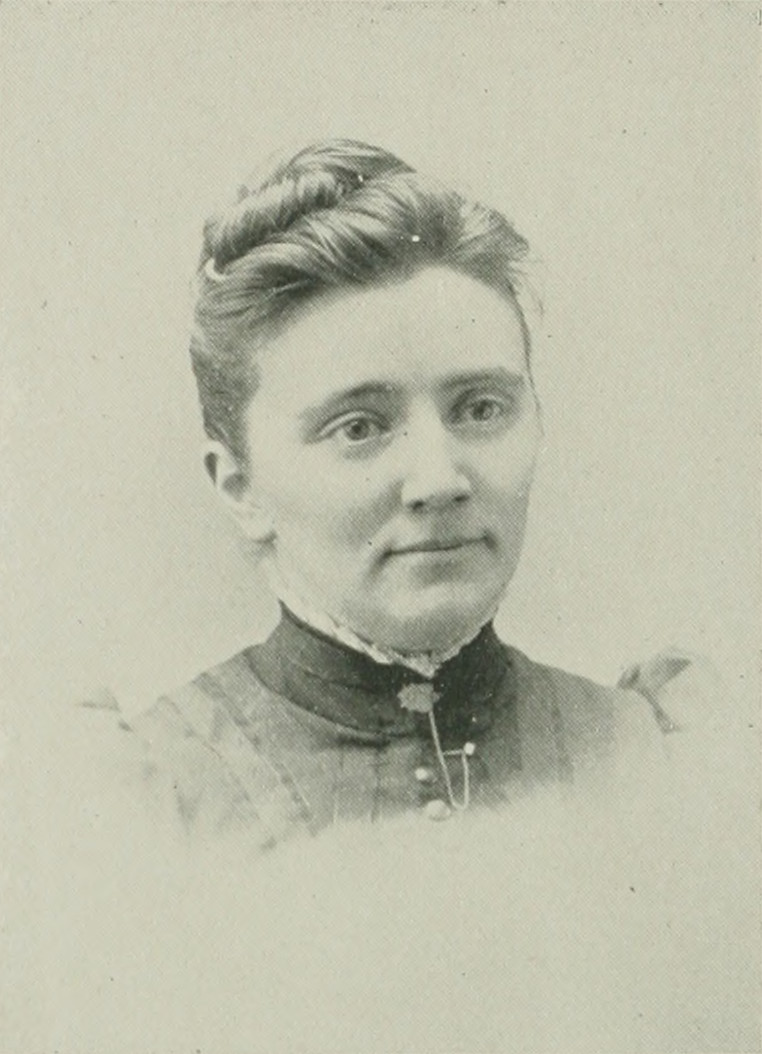
- "A Woman of the Century"
- Born: Jane Maria Bingham; March 16, 1859; Fulton, New York, U.S.
- Died: June 27, 1933, 74 years old
- Other name: "Jennie"
- Education: Syracuse University
- Occupations: author; litterateur
- Writing career
- Genres: fiction; non-fiction
- Subjects: biography; religion

Jennie M. Bingham (March 16, 1859 – June 27, 1933) was an American writer and litterateur, born in New York. When poor health prevented her from pursuing a teaching career, she turned to writing and went on to produce work in a wide range of genres, including fiction, poetry, essays, book reviews, Sunday-school literature, and art criticism. Her publications included novels, short stories, missionary literature, and biographical works such as Annals of the Round Table (1885), All Glorious Within (1889), and The Life of the Seventh Earl of Shaftesbury, K.G. (1899). Bingham contributed articles and stories to periodicals including Christian Union and Harper's Young People, and her poetry appeared in The Magazine of Poetry and Literary Review. She was active in charitable work in New York City, held leadership roles in the Woman's Foreign Missionary Society of the Methodist Episcopal Church, and taught at the Folts Mission Institute in Herkimer, New York.

== Early life and education ==
Jane (nickname, "Jennie") Maria Bingham was born in Fulton, New York, March 16, 1859. She was the daughter of Jane (Mills) (1821–1894) and the Rev. Dr. Isaac Sabin Bingham (1819–1893). For decades, her father was in the ministry of the Methodist Episcopal Church. Jennie's siblings were Charles, Melville, Wilbur, George, Franklin, and Mary.

As an adult, she attended Syracuse University (1896–97) as a non-graduating student.

== Career ==
When poor health ended the possibility of teaching, Bingham started writing for a living. Her first article offered for publication was a short story entitled "A Hospital Sketch", which appeared in the Christian Union. Among her early productions was a missionary story, "A Grain of Mustard Seed" (1881) of which 8,000 copies were sold during the first six months after publication, the proceeds of which founded a home in Japan. She worked in every department of literature, book-reviewing, essay writing, fiction, poetry, Sunday-school literature and art criticism. Some of her short stories appeared in Harper's Young People. Her poetry appeared in The Magazine of Poetry and Literary Review (1895). "Three Reasons", published by the Woman's Foreign Missionary Society of the Methodist Episcopal Church, was prepared especially for the Young Woman's Missionary Societies.

She was the author of Annals of the Round Table (18S5), and All Glorious Within (1889), the latter a story embodying the origin and work of the International Order of the King's Daughters. The life of the seventh Earl of Shaftesbury, K. G. (1899) was part of the Epworth League Reading course of 1899–1900.

Bingham was specially interested in the charities of New York City, and part of her work included visiting then and writing concerning them. The Newsboys' Lodging House, Five Points Mission, Flower Mission, Florence Night Mission, and Children's Aid Society were among her subjects. Her life was a busy one, in which literature was incidental. Bingham's home was in Herkimer, New York. Representing the New York Branch, Bingham served on the General Executive committee, Woman's Foreign Missionary Society of the Methodist Episcopal Church. She was also employed as an instructor at the Folts Mission Institute, Herkimer, New York.

== Death ==
Jennie M. Bingham died on June 27, 1933.

== Selected works ==
- Annals of the Round Table (18S5) (text)
- All Glorious Within (1889)
- The Picket line of missions (co-author; 1897) (text)
- The life of the seventh Earl of Shaftesbury, K. G. (1899) (text)

=== Short stories ===
- "A Hospital Sketch"
- "A Grain of Mustard Seed" (1881)
- "Melissa's Successful Failure" (1901)
- "Margy's 'Holy Grail'" (1924)

=== Non-fiction ===
- "Charlotte Brontë" (Home College Series; 1883) (text)
- "Margaret Fuller" (Home College Series; 1883) (text)
- "Charles Lamb" (Home College Series; 1883) (text)
- "Question Drawer" (1899)
- "By Way of Illustration" (1899)
- "A Select Three, A Story for Standard Bearers" (1901)
- "Three Reasons" (1901)
- "Some Foreign Standard Bearers" (1901)
- "Briton Rivière" (1902)
- "French's Masterpiece" (1902)
- "Rembrandt and His Picture, 'The Anatomy Lesson'" (1902)

=== Poems ===
- "Weights and Wings"
- "November"
- "Easter Lilies"
- "Patience"
