= Mercy Home for Boys and Girls =

American childcare and residential home in Illinois, United States

The Mission of Our Lady of Mercy, Inc.
- Nickname: Mercy Home for Boys & Girls
- Predecessor: St. Paul's Home for Working Boys
- Formation: 1887
- Founder: Fr. Louis Campbell
- Founded at: Chicago, Illinois
- Type: Nonprofit
- Tax ID no.: 36-2171726
- Legal status: Active
- Headquarters: 1140 West Jackson Blvd. Chicago, Illinois
- Region served: Chicago
- President/CEO: Fr. Scott Donahue
- Chairman, Board of Directors: Joe Nolan
- Parent organization: Roman Catholic Archdiocese of Chicago
- Website: www.mercyhome.org

Mercy Home for Boys & Girls is an American privately funded childcare and residential home for abused, homeless and neglected children or children struggling with family issues, in Illinois.

== History ==
Founded in 1887 in Chicago by Fr. Louis Campbell, a Chicago priest, the shelter's original mission was to house homeless, orphaned, and abandoned boys in and around the Chicago area. Under the initial guidance of the Archdiocese of Chicago, a struggling orphanage became a boys' home under the name of the Mission of our Lady of Mercy.

Mercy Home began accepting girls in 1987. Three years later, it was renamed Mercy Home for Boys and Girls. Mercy Home is composed of two separate campuses where abused and neglected children are cared for—the Boys' Campus, located in Chicago's West Loop area, and the Girls' Campus, located south, in Chicago's Morgan Park community.

Today, abused and neglected children (both boys and girls) are assisted by one of Mercy Home's fourteen residential programs.

== Leadership ==
Fr. Scott Donahue, President of Mercy Home, came to the agency in 1990 when then-President, Fr. James J. Close, invited him to assist in Mercy Home's mission. A renowned activist, philanthropist, author , and civic leader , Fr. Close served as Mercy Home's president for thirty-three years. Three years later, Fr. Donahue became Mercy Home's associate president. In 2006, Fr. Donahue became President of Mercy Home after Fr. Close retired in April.

== Certification and accreditation ==
Mercy Home is a licensed 501(c)(3) childcare institution and child welfare agency and accredited by the Council on Accreditation of Services for Children and Families (COA).

Since Mercy Home is not federally funded, over 98% of Mercy Home's funding comes from private resources.

== Locations ==
- West Loop Boys' Campus: 1140 W. Jackson Blvd. Chicago, IL 60607 (41°52′41.5″N 87°39′20.9″W)
- Walsh Girls' Campus: 11600 S. Longwood Dr. Chicago, IL, 60643 (41°40′56.6″N 87°40′29″W)
