= Jonathan Folts =

American Episcopalian bishop

The Right Reverend Doctor Jonathan H. Folts
- Bishop of South Dakota
- Church: Episcopal Church
- Diocese: South Dakota
- Elected: May 4, 2019
- In office: 2019–present
- Predecessor: John Tarrant

Orders
- Ordination: 1996 by James E. Folts
- Consecration: November 2, 2019 by Michael Curry

Personal details
- Born: January 30, 1968 (age 58)
- Denomination: Anglican
- Parents: James E. Folts & Sandra Johnston
- Spouse: Kimberly Folts (m. 1996)
- Children: Cameron Folts (1999) Garrett Folts (2000) Chloe Folts (2002)

Jonathan H. Folts (born January 30, 1968) is an American prelate of the Episcopal Church who serves as the current and eleventh Bishop of South Dakota.

== Biography ==
Bishop Folts was born on January 30, 1968, the son of the Right Reverend James E. Folts, Bishop of West Texas, and Sandra Johnston. He graduated from the University of North Texas with a Bachelor of Arts in 1991, and then with a Master of Divinity from the Virginia Theological Seminary in 1996. He also earned a Doctor of Ministry from the Virginia Seminary in 2013.

Bishop Folts was ordained deacon in 1996 and priest in 1997 by his father. He then served as Vicar of Holy Spirit Church in Dripping Springs, Texas (1996-1997); Vicar of St. Elizabeth's Church in Buda, Texas (1996-1999); Rector of St. Francis Church in Victoria, Texas (1999-2004); and Rector of St. John's Church in Essex, Connecticut (2004-2019).

On May 4, 2019, Folts was elected as the Bishop of South Dakota during a special convention. He was consecrated on November 2, 2019, at the T.F. Riggs High School Theater in Pierre, South Dakota with Presiding Bishop Michael Curry as chief consecrator.

Folts announced plans to retire effective October 31, 2027.
