= Scott Bailey (bishop) =

American Episcopalian bishop

The Right Reverend Scott Field Bailey
- Bishop of West Texas
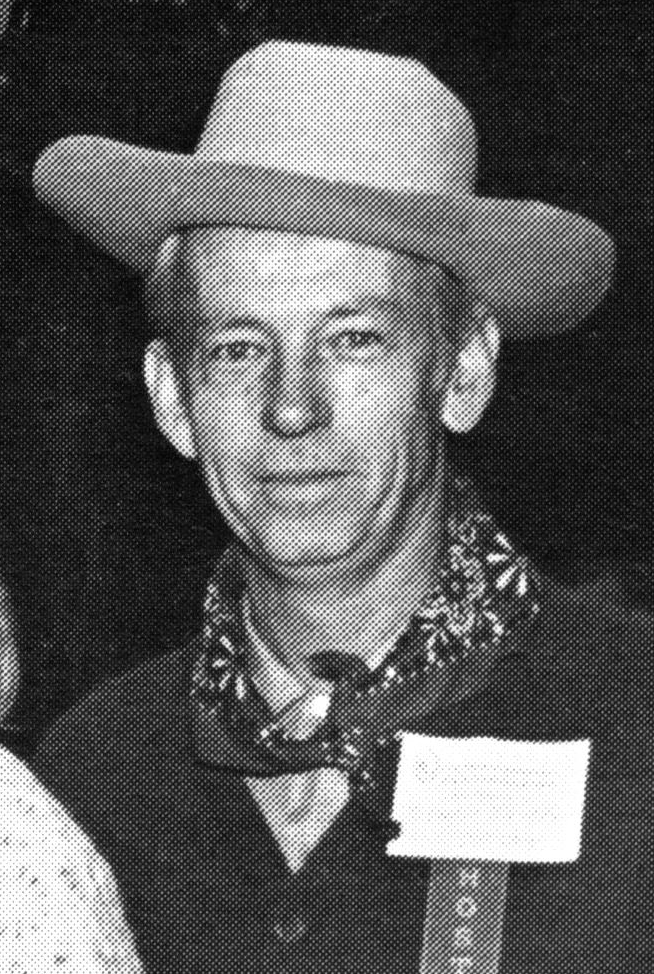
- Bailey in informal dress during a social event at the 1970 General Convention.
- Church: Episcopal Church
- Diocese: West Texas
- Elected: September 3, 1975
- In office: 1977–1987
- Predecessor: Harold Gosnell
- Successor: John H. MacNaughton
- Previous posts: Suffragan Bishop of Texas (1964–1975); Coadjutor Bishop of West Texas (1975–1977)

Orders
- Ordination: March 1942 (deacon); December 1942 (priest) by Clinton S. Quin
- Consecration: September 21, 1964 by John E. Hines

Personal details
- Born: October 7, 1916 Houston, Texas, United States
- Died: April 9, 2005 (aged 88) San Antonio, Texas, United States
- Buried: Bishop Jones Center, San Antonio
- Denomination: Anglican
- Parents: William Stuart Bailey & Tallulah Prince Smith
- Spouse: Evelyn Louise Williams (m. 1943)
- Children: 4

Scott Field Bailey (October 7, 1916 – April 9, 2005) was the 6th diocesan bishop of the Episcopal Diocese of West Texas in the Episcopal Church.

== Early life and education ==
Bailey was born on October 7, 1916, in Houston, Texas, the son of William Stuart Bailey and Tallulah Prince Smith. He received his BA degree in 1938 from Rice University, after which he attended law school at the University of Texas and then the Virginia Theological Seminary, obtaining his Master in Divinity degree in 1942. In 1953 he received the Master of Sacred Theology degree from the University of the South. Later Doctor of Divinity degrees were conferred upon him by the Virginia Seminary, the University of the South, and the Seminary of the Southwest.

== Career ==
Bailey was ordained a deacon in March 1942 and priest in December 1942 by Bishop Clinton S. Quin, 3rd Bishop of Texas. He began his ministry in 1942 at St. Paul's Church, Waco where he was associate rector as well as priest-in-charge of St. Mary's Church, Lampasas. He married Evelyn Louise Williams in 1943 and entered the navy as a chaplain that same year, serving in the South Pacific Theater. In 1946, he became rector of Christ Church, Nacogdoches, and priest-in-charge of Christ Church, San Augustine. He was called to serve as rector of All Saints' Church in Austin in 1951 and Director of Episcopal Student Activities at the University of Texas. Also in Austin, Bailey founded St. Andrew's Episcopal School and was active in the life of St. Stephen's Episcopal School. In 1961, Bailey was designated canon to the ordinary and moved to the diocesan headquarters in Houston.

== Bishop ==
On May 22, 1964, he was elected suffragan bishop of the Episcopal Diocese of Texas on the third ballot in St Mark's Church, Beaumont, Texas. He was consecrated bishop on September 21, 1964, in Christ Church Cathedral. He served there until 1975 when he was named on the sixth ballot as bishop coadjutor for the Episcopal Diocese of West Texas on September 3, 1975, during a special council meeting which took place in Christ Church in San Antonio, Texas. Upon the retirement of Bishop Gosnell in 1977, Bailey was installed as the sixth bishop of the Diocese of West Texas on February 17, 1977, and served until his retirement in 1987.

Bailey served as Secretary to the House of Bishops from 1967 until 1986, and served as Executive Officer of the General Convention from 1974 to 1976. From 1967 to 1986 he served as President of the Church Historical Society and as chairman of the Board of the Archives of the Episcopal Church from its inception in 1985 until 1996.

== Consecrators ==
The Rt. Rev. John E. Hines, 4th Bishop of Texas

The Rt. Rev. George H. Quarterman, first Bishop of Northwest Texas

The Rt. Rev. F. Percy Goddard, Suffagan Bishop of Texas

Scott Field Bailey was the 604th bishop consecrated in the Episcopal Church.
