= James S. Johnston =

American bishop (18943–1924)

The Right Reverend James Steptoe Johnston DD
- Bishop of West Texas
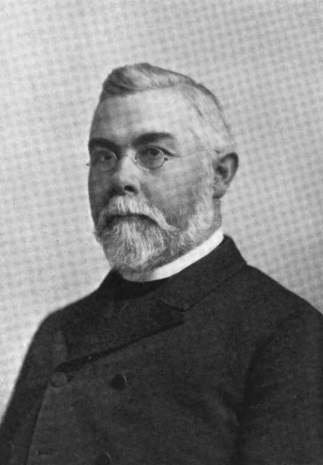
- Bishop Johnston
- Church: Episcopal Church
- Diocese: West Texas
- Elected: October 1887
- In office: 1888-1916
- Predecessor: Robert W. B. Elliott
- Successor: William Theodotus Capers

Orders
- Ordination: December 22, 1869 (deacon); April 30, 1871 (priest) by William Mercer Green
- Consecration: January 6, 1888 by Richard Hooker Wilmer

Personal details
- Born: June 9, 1843 Church Hill, Mississippi
- Died: November 4, 1924 (aged 81) San Antonio, Texas
- Buried: Mission Burial Park South, San Antonio
- Denomination: Anglican
- Parents: James S. Johnston & Louisa C. B. Newman
- Spouse: Mary Mercer Green (m. 1865)
- Children: 6
- Education: University of Virginia

James Steptoe Johnston (June 9, 1843 – November 4, 1924) was an American Confederate veteran, preacher and educator. He served as a bishop of the Episcopal Church in the United States of America. He was the last bishop of the Missionary Jurisdiction of Western Texas and the first bishop of its successor, the Diocese of West Texas. He was also the founder of TMI — The Episcopal School of Texas, a private school in San Antonio, Texas.

== Biography ==
=== childhood ===
Hailing from a distinguished Virginia family, which was linked to the Washingtons through the Steptoes, Confederate General Joseph Eggleston Johnston, and best-selling novelist Mary Johnston (d. 1936), James Steptoe Johnston was born in 1843 at "Botetourt" near Church Hill, Jefferson County, Mississippi. He was the son of a local attorney and cotton planter James Steptoe Johnston and his wife Louisa Clarissa Bridges Newman. He was educated at Oakland College, near Rodney, Mississippi. Most of the students at Oakland at this time were in the preparatory department. (Oakland was closed during the Civil War and re-established as Chamberlain-Hunt Academy in 1879.) Johnston left Oakland for the University of Virginia in Charlottesville, Virginia, but left after one year to enlist in the Confederate States Army. While in college he was a member of the Delta Psi fraternity (a.k.a. St. Anthony Hall ).

Johnston was first an infantryman with the 11th Mississippi Regiment during the first part of the war. He saw heavy fighting in numerous battles in 1861 and 1862, and he survived them. Some time after the Battle of Sharpsburg or Antietam on September 17, 1862, Johnston was commissioned a lieutenant in the Cavalry Corps, Army of Northern Virginia. He saw action at the Second Battle of Bull Run and other cavalry engagements before being captured by Union forces and spending one year as a prisoner of war.

After the war, Johnston studied law then practiced as an attorney until 1867, when he began to read for holy orders in the Episcopal Church. Staying in his home country until 1876, Johnston was ordained to the diaconate on December 22, 1869, in Christ Church, Vicksburg, Mississippi, and to the priesthood on April 30, 1871, in Trinity Church, Natchez, Mississippi, on both occasions by William Mercer Green, Bishop of Mississippi. Johnston married Mary Mercer Green (1844-1881), whom he had known as a teenager. Mary was well connected in the Natchez District. Together the Johnstons had five children before Mary's death in Mobile in 1881. From 1870 to 1876, J.S. Johnston was Rector of St James' Church in Port Gibson, Mississippi and then was Rector of Ascension Church in Mount Sterling, Kentucky from 1876 until 1880. In 1880, he became Rector of Trinity Church in Mobile, Alabama. In 1887, he was elected as the second bishop of the Missionary District of western Texas and was awarded a Doctorate of Divinity from the University of the South at Sewanee, Tennessee, in the same year.

=== Career ===
The early years of Johnston's episcopate were difficult. He was the sole bishop for an area of some 100,000 square miles (260,000 km^{2}), most of which was only accessibly on horseback or by stage coach. The area was also experiencing severe economic difficulties due to a prolonged drought. He particularly stressed the need for an educated élite in such an environment, and to this end founded in 1893 a Church school he named the West Texas Military Academy (now TMI — The Episcopal School of Texas) to provide a classical and Christian education for young men in the area. Johnston raised money for the school from wealthy Episcopalians on the Eastern Seaboard.

Johnston became a progressive in terms of race. He wished to see greater equality between whites, blacks, and the more numerous Mexican-American citizens of his region. He was instrumental to founding St. Philip's College in San Antonio, which existed for the training of African-American women. He happily welcomed a formerly Methodist congregation of African-Americans into the Episcopal Church. Like his predecessor in West Texas, Robert Woodward Barnwell Elliott, Bishop Johnston came from the Southern High Church inflection of the Episcopal Church; so he was open to ideas from the Oxford or Tractarian Movement (1833-1845) and was quite advanced with his view that Episcopalians must seek fellowship with the Roman Catholic Church. The Roman Catholic Church was by far the largest religious group in Southern and Western Texas. Johnston wrote on several occasions to the Vatican expressing his desire for Christian unity. In 1904, West Texas became a self-supporting diocese and Johnston was duly elected its first ordinary bishop. Johnston retired in 1916, having served for twenty-eight years as a bishop. He remained committed to the life of the diocese, especially to St. Philip's and WTMA. In regards to the latter project, which became a highly regarded college preparatory school, he once wrote to a prospective donor: "The best use of wealth is to coin it into character."

=== Death ===
He died at his home in San Antonio on November 4, 1924.
