= Joseph Flintoft Berry =

Canadian bishop

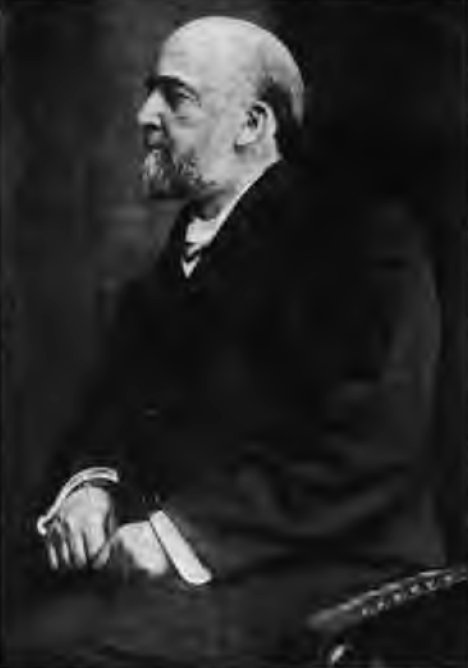
Joseph F. Berry circa 1904

Joseph Flintoft Berry (May 13, 1856 – February 11, 1931) was a bishop of the Methodist Episcopal Church, elected in 1904.

== Birth and family ==
Joseph was born 13 May 1856 in Aylmer, Ontario, Canada, the son of the Rev. Francis and Ann Berry. He was the brother of Dr. H.G. Berry. Joseph was married to Olive J. Johnson.

== Education ==
Joseph was educated at the Milton Academy in Ontario. He was led to Christ by two young friends, who took him to his father's barn and there held a prayer-meeting. This resulted in Joseph's conversion.

Joseph entered the Ordained Ministry of the M.E. Church in 1874. Joseph came to Mount Clemens, Michigan in 1879 to pastor the First M.E. Church. He served as the Associate Editor of the Michigan Christian Advocate, 1885–90. He also served as Editor of the Epworth Herald, the official publication of the Epworth League, 1890–1904.

March 5, 1924, it was reported that Bishop Berry of Philadelphia told the New Jersey Methodist Conference that "every Methodist preacher has as much right to belong to the Ku Klux Klan as to Masons or Odd Fellows if he thinks it is a proper thing to do."

Bishop Berry served the Buffalo, New York Episcopal Area (Genesee Annual Conference) for eight years. He then served the Philadelphia Area until retirement. His retirement was spent in Winter Park, Florida, where he died 11 February 1931 at the age of 74. His body was brought back to Mount Clemens, Michigan to be buried with his two sons who had died during his pastorate there. His father, mother and wife are also buried in his cemetery lot.

== See also ==
- List of bishops of the United Methodist Church
