= Montpelier Female Institute =

- U.S. National Register of Historic Places
- Location within Georgia
- Nearest city: Macon, Georgia
- Coordinates: 32°52′11″N 83°53′01″W
- Area: 200 acres (81 ha)
- Built: 1843
- Architectural style: Greek Revival
- NRHP reference No.: 75000602
- Added to NRHP: October 10, 1975

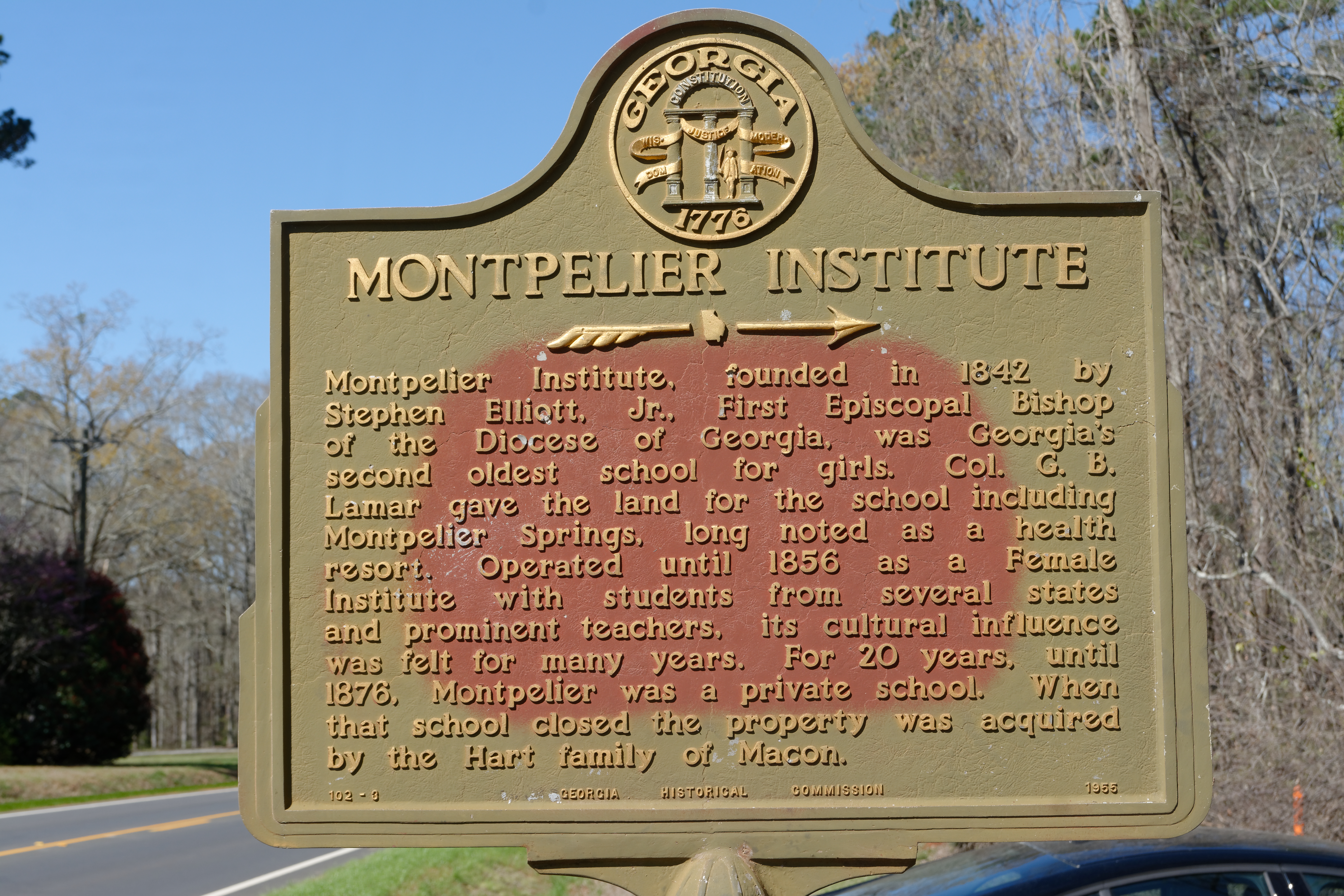
Historical marker at the entrance from Georgia Highway 74

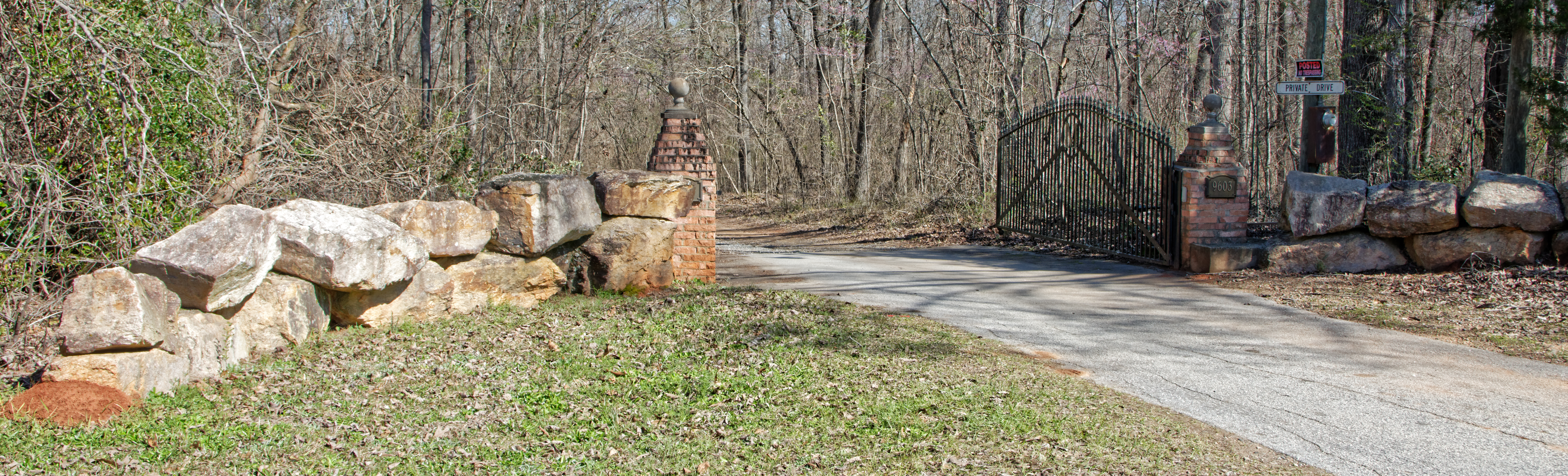
Entrance to Montpelier Institute from Highway 74

First known as the Montpelier Institute and later as the Montpelier Collegiate Institute, the Montpelier Female Institute was a school founded by Episcopal Bishop Stephen Elliott at Montpelier Springs, Monroe County, Georgia in 1841, and is notable as one of the earliest in the state to admit girls. After changing hands several times, it finally closed in 1878.

It is commemorated by a Georgia Historical Marker on Georgia State Route 74, at 32.865105°N 83.882016°W.

It was added to the National Register of Historic Places in 1975.

== Foundation ==
The Rt. Rev. Stephen Elliott, the then newly-appointed first Bishop of Georgia, decided to establish a school there and in 1840 obtained a charter from the Georgia State Legislature. In 1841 he spent four days at Montpelier Springs (a location south of Forsyth, which had operated as a health and recreation resort from at least 1831, and included a hotel) working on organizing schools and an adjacent church. He recorded that On the fourth Sunday after Easter, 1841, I confirmed in the temporary Chapel of the Springs, seventeen persons, thirteen of whom were slaves. After Morning Service a Church was organized, under the title of St Luke’s Church, Montpelier Springs, Monroe Co., Ga, by the election of Wardens and a Vestry.

== The Montpelier Institute ==
Initially Elliott planned for both boys’ and girls’ schools on an 800-acre campus, supported by a working farm staffed by enslaved persons whose work would pay the bulk of the costs of the school. By the spring of 1842, he could say, Our Schools have flourished at the Springs beyond our most sanguine expectation. That December, he reported that when he went back to Montpelier Springs to inspect the schools and make arrangements for the winter term, I found everything in the very best condition, full of promise to the Church and to the State. The girls were taught in Lamar Hall, named for G B Lamar of Savannah, who had given a 500-acre tract for the institute. The boys were a mile distant in Chase Hall, named for Bishop Philander Chase, who was then Presiding Bishop of the Episcopal Church. By 1846, Bishop Elliott was living on the grounds of the school. By that time, more than 80 students were enrolled in the two schools. However, rapid expansion of the school including the completion of more buildings created debt. The Institute was never funded by the Diocese and Elliott had used his own personal property as a guarantee. In 1850, the school debts had mounted to a degree that Bishop Elliott was obliged to sell all of his land and his considerable holdings in enslaved persons. The school was sold at a sheriff’s sale for $13,000 to make up the rest of the indebtedness. The institute was bought by Joseph Story Fay and continued as a school under its Board of Trustees, but Elliott continued to administer the school remotely from Savannah until 1854. This first incarnation of the school closed in 1855. At this point, Professor Carlisle Martin bought the land and organized a school for young men. This was in operation until 1861, and was relatively successful. After the start of the Civil War, however, numbers dropped and the buildings were used as the depot for military supplies shipped from Savannah and Augusta.

== Montpelier Female Institute ==
In its next phase, the Institute was solely a girls’ school. By 1862 its title was the Montpelier Female Institute, and its rector was the Welshman Rev John T Pryse. Under Union threat, the school was closed in 1864 and the students sent to Macon. Its grounds and buildings were used as a supply station, training ground and convalescent home for Confederate soldiers.

== Montpelier Collegiate Institute ==
There had been recent renovations in 1866, when an advertisement appeared for the start of the September term at what was now named the ‘Montpelier Collegiate Institute’. A fire occurred in 1872, which appears to have marked a temporary end to teaching there, but Pryse undertook to continue holding services at the chapel.

== The final phase ==
In its final incarnation, the school was purchased by Benjamin M Polhill and his wife. Under his management a school for boys continued in operation until 1878. The site was again sold in 1879 to Captain John Waller Hart. The property remains private and is still owned by the Hart family.
