= Trinity Episcopal Church (Searcy, Arkansas) =

Historic church in Arkansas, United States

- U.S. National Register of Historic Places
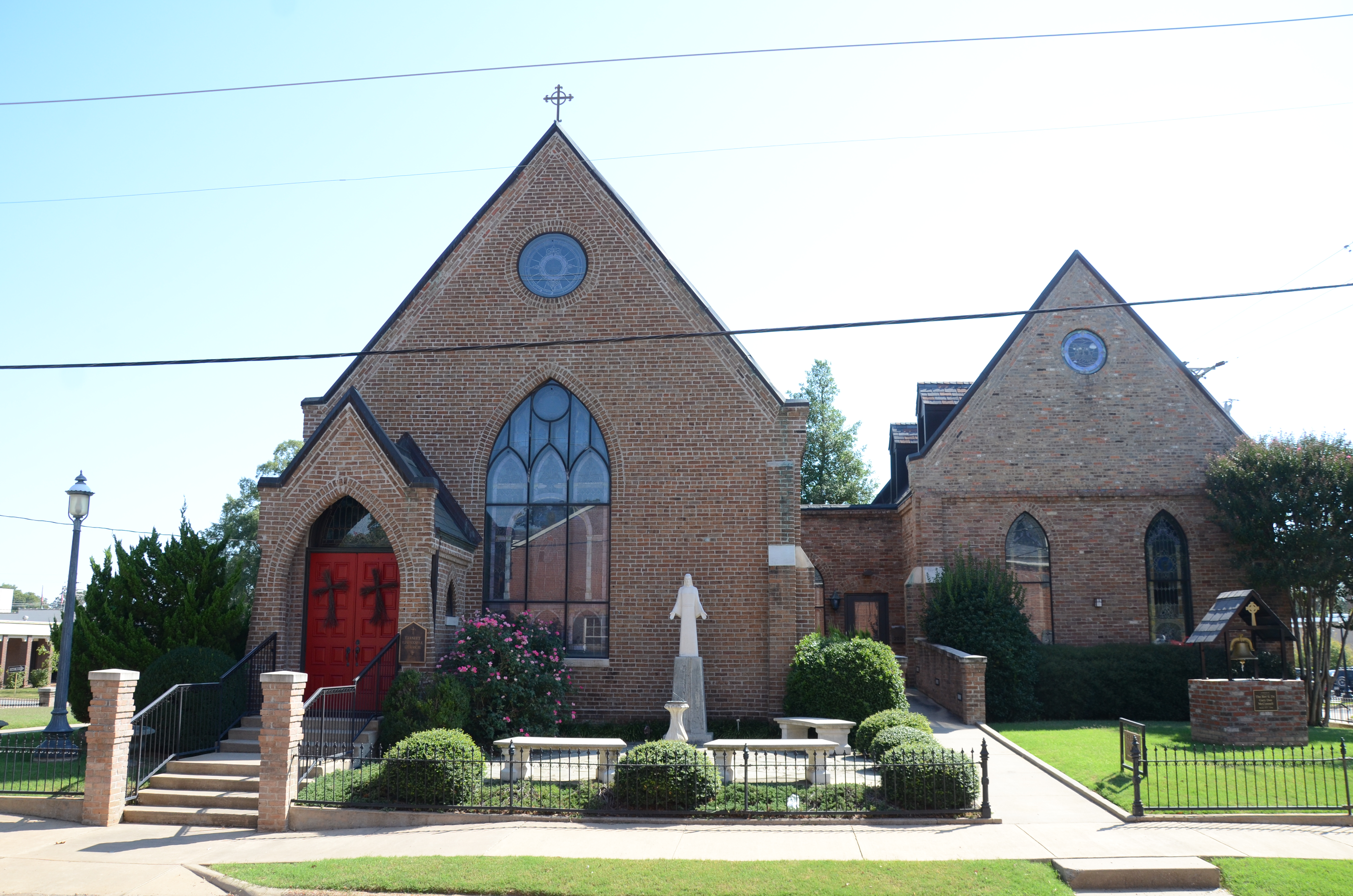

- Location within Arkansas Location within the United States
- Location: Jct. of N. Elm and Market Sts., Searcy, Arkansas
- Coordinates: 35°14′59″N 91°44′25″W
- Area: less than one acre
- Built: 1902
- Architectural style: Gothic
- MPS: White County MPS
- NRHP reference No.: 91001199
- Added to NRHP: July 23, 1992

Trinity Episcopal Church is a historic church at the junction of North Elm and Market Streets in Searcy, Arkansas. It is part of the Episcopal Diocese of Arkansas. The Rev. Mark Harris is rector.

In 2015, the church reported 134 members; in 2023, it reported 66 members. No membership statistics were reported in 2024 national parochial reports. Plate and pledge financial support reported by the church in 2024 was $150,378. Average Sunday Attendance (ASA) reported in 2024 was 39 persons. This was a relative decrease from ASA of 47 persons reported in 2020.

== Building ==
The church is a single-story brick building, built in the English parish church style in 1902, and is joined by a small connector to a 1935 parish house of similar construction. It is the only church of this style in White County. Its main facade has buttressed corners, and a large lancet-arched window at the center, with the main entrance set recessed in a projecting gabled section to its left. The building was listed on the National Register of Historic Places in 1992.

== See also ==
- National Register of Historic Places listings in White County, Arkansas
