= Province 7 of the Episcopal Church =

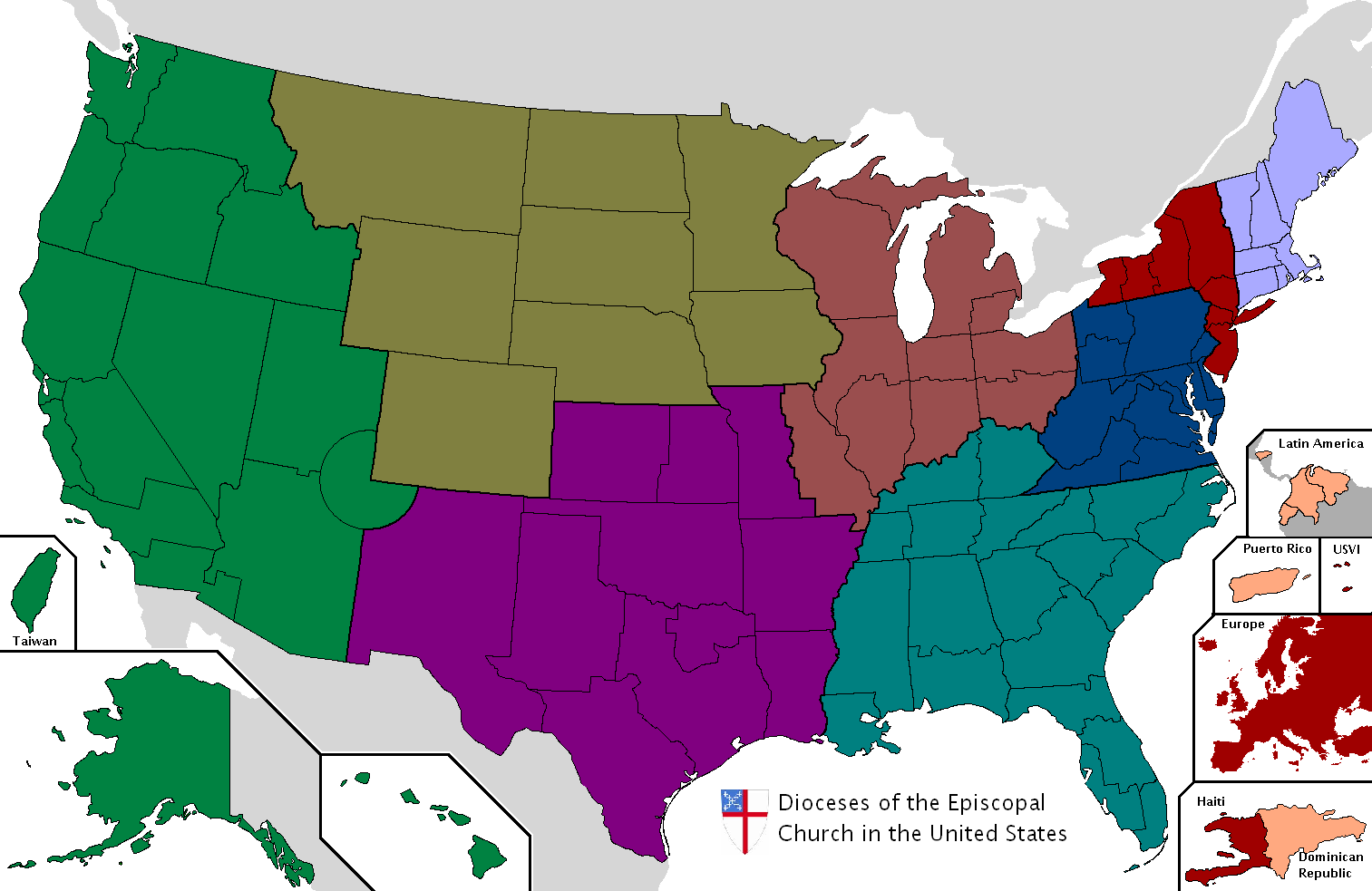
Province VII of the ECUSA

Province 7 (VII), also called the Province of the Southwest, is one of nine ecclesiastical provinces comprising the Episcopal Church in the United States of America. It comprises eleven dioceses across the seven states of Arkansas, Kansas, Louisiana, Missouri, New Mexico, Oklahoma, and Texas. Sherry Denton of the Diocese of Western Kansas serves as President and Edward J. Konieczny of the Diocese of Oklahoma serves as Vice President.

Statistically, the province reported 208,237 members in 2015 and 183,968 members in 2023; no membership statistics were reported in 2024 national parochial reports. Plate and pledge income for the 656 filing congregations of the province in 2024 was $223,059,848. Average Sunday attendance (ASA) in 2024 was 51,380 persons. This was a decrease from ASA of 69,219 in 2015.

== Dioceses of Province VII ==
- Diocese of Arkansas
- Diocese of Dallas
- Diocese of Kansas
- Diocese of Northwest Texas
- Diocese of Oklahoma
- Diocese of the Rio Grande
- Diocese of Texas
- Diocese of West Missouri
- Diocese of West Texas
- Diocese of Western Kansas
- Diocese of Western Louisiana

== References and external links ==
- ECUSA Province Directory (2010 archived version)
- Province VII website

Specific
