= Episcopal Diocese of West Texas =

Diocese of the Episcopal Church in the United States

Coordinates: 29.4717°N 98.4681°W

Diocese of West Texas Diœcesis Texensis Occidentalis

Location
- Country: United States
- Territory: The Texas counties of Aransas, Atascosa, Bandera, Bee, Bexar, Blanco, Brooks, Caldwell, Calhoun, Cameron, Comal, Concho, Crockett, DeWitt, Dimmit, Duval, Edwards, Frio, Gillespie, Goliad, Gonzales, Guadelupe, Hay, Hidalgo, Jackson, Jim Hogg, Jim Wells, Karnes, Kendall, Kenedy, Kerr, Kimble, Kinney, Kleberg, Lavaca, LaSalle, Live Oak, Llano, Mason, Maverick, McCullough, McMullen, Medina, Menard, Nueces, Real, Refugio, San Patricio, San Saba, Schleicher, Starr, Sutton, Uvalde, Val Verde, Victoria, Webb, Willacy, Wilson, Zapata, and Zavala
- Ecclesiastical province: Province VII

Statistics
- Congregations: 87 (2025)
- Members: 19,156 (2025)

Information
- Rite: Episcopal Church
- Established: May 10, 1904

Current leadership
- Bishop: David G. Read

Map
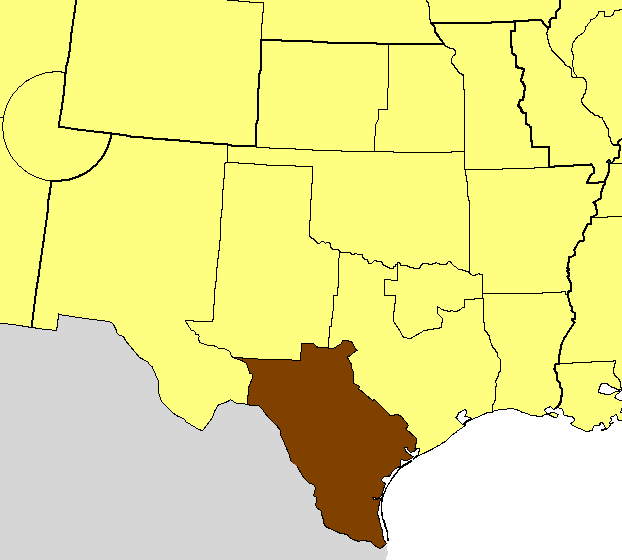
- Location of the Diocese of West Texas

Website
- www.dwtx.org

The Episcopal Diocese of West Texas is the diocese of the Episcopal Church in the United States of America whose territory comprises the southernmost part of the state of Texas.

In 2025, the diocese reported average Sunday attendance (ASA) of 7,175 persons, down from ASA of 8,592 in 2016. Public membership figures cited a decline from 22,963 in 2015 to 19,156 in 2025. The 87 reporting congregations of the diocese had $30,786,068 in plate and pledge income in 2025.

== Territory ==
The see city is San Antonio, and the diocese includes the cities of Corpus Christi and Brownsville. (The westernmost part of Texas, including El Paso, falls under the Episcopal Diocese of the Rio Grande, which also covers all of New Mexico.)

== History ==
The Diocese of West Texas was formed on October 26, 1874 when the General Convention of the Episcopal Church voted in favor of the division of the Episcopal Diocese of Texas which led to the formation of the Missionary District of Northern Texas and the Missionary District of Western Texas. The Missionary District of Western Texas was formally established on May 6, 1875. On May 10, 1904, the missionary district was elevated to the status of a diocese, which led to the establishment of the Diocese of West Texas.

== Structure ==
The diocese and its parishes sponsor twenty-eight parochial schools and preschools, including TMI Episcopal (founded as "West Texas Military Academy"), a boarding college-preparatory school on the outskirts of San Antonio. The diocese was also instrumental in the founding of St. Philip's College, which became a public community college in 1942.

As of 2025, the 5 largest parishes in the diocese by average weekly attendance are Christ Church, San Antonio, St Mark's, San Antonio, St Thomas Church and School, San Antonio, St Luke's, San Antonio, and Good Shepherd, Corpus Christi.

The Diocese of West Texas is part of Province VII.

== Bishops ==
There have been eleven diocesan bishops of West Texas and six suffragan bishops:

1. Robert W. B. Elliott (1874–1887)
2. James Steptoe Johnston (1888–1916)
3. William Theodotus Capers (1916–1943)
4. Everett Holland Jones (1943–1968)
  *Richard Earl Dicus, suffragan (1955-1976)
5. Harold Cornelius Gosnell (1968–1977)
6. Scott Field Bailey (1977–1987)
  *Stanley F. Hauser, suffragan (1979-1987)
7. John Herbert MacNaughton (1987–1995)
  *Earl N. McArthur, suffragan (1988-1993)
8. James E. Folts (1996–2006)
  *Robert B. Hibbs, suffragan (1996-2003)
9. Gary Richard Lillibridge (2006–2017)
  *David M. Reed, suffragan (2006-2015), coadjutor (2015-2017)
  *Jennifer Brooke-Davidson, suffragan (2016-2019)
10. David M. Reed (2017-2023)
11. David G. Read (2023 - present)
  *Angela Cortiñas, suffragan (2025-present)

The diocese does not have a church designated as its cathedral; the diocesan offices are in the Bishop Jones Center in San Antonio.
