= St. Mark's Episcopal Church (San Antonio, Texas) =

Historic church in Texas, United States

St Mark's Church
- The Parish Church of Saint Mark the Evangelist
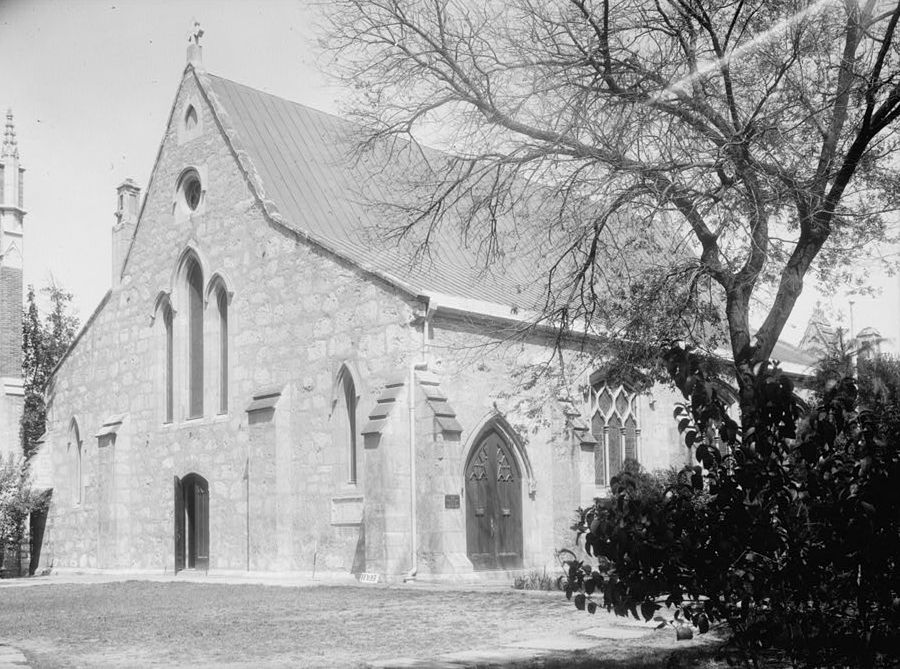
- St Mark's Church
- 29.4284°N 98.4896°W
- Location: 315 East Pecan Street, San Antonio, Texas
- Country: U.S.
- Denomination: Episcopal Church

History
- Status: Active

Architecture
- Functional status: Parish Church
- Architect: Richard Upjohn
- Completed: 1877

Administration
- Province: Province VII
- Diocese: Episcopal Diocese of West Texas

Clergy
- Rector: The Rev. Elizabeth Knowlton
- Priest: The Rev. Ann Benton Fraser
- St. Mark's Episcopal Church
- U.S. National Register of Historic Places
- Recorded Texas Historic Landmark
- NRHP reference No.: 98000103
- RTHL No.: 4463

Significant dates
- Added to NRHP: February 12, 1998
- Designated RTHL: 1962

St. Mark's Episcopal Church is a historic church in San Antonio, Texas, United States. It is an Episcopal church in the Diocese of West Texas.

== History ==
St. Mark's was founded as a parish in 1858. A previous attempt at organizing an Episcopal presence in the area had left a partially-built church on the site, which was taken over by the new parish. Construction was started and stopped several times, due to financial troubles and the outbreak of the Civil War. By 1873, the congregation had successfully finished the building, earning some income by renting the lower portion of the facility out for school purposes. The congregation was outgrowing the building, so construction began again in July 1873, and re-opening services were held on Easter in 1875. Once the church was fully finished and its debt paid off, St. Mark's was consecrated on St. Mark's Day: April 25, 1881.

St. Mark's Church served briefly as a cathedral, designated for the specific assignment of incoming bishop Dr. Robert W.B. Elliott. A former Confederate soldier, Elliott was ordained in Georgia in 1868, and in 1874, was elected to serve as the first missionary bishop to the newly-formed diocese Missionary District of Western Texas. Elliott held the post of bishop until his death in 1887. Under his successor, James Steptoe Johnston, the Missionary District became the Diocese of West Texas, and St. Mark's reverted to its original status as a regular parish church.

The modern church is located at 315 East Pecan Street in Travis Park, in the heart of the River Walk District and is only four blocks from the Alamo. It was added to the National Register of Historic Places on February 12, 1998.

Lady Bird Johnson and Lyndon B. Johnson were married at St. Mark's by Rev. Arthur R. McKinstry on November 17, 1934.

The rector is the Reverend Beth Knowlton (called to be rector on May 20, 2014).

St. Mark's belfry houses a bell that was cast in New York in 1874 from the remains of the "Come and Take It" cannon that ignited the Texas Revolution in 1835 at Gonzales, TX. The cannon; a six-pound, Spanish made, bronze, artillery piece was unearthed in 1852, inside the Alamo, after being spiked and buried by Mexican troops after the defeat of the Alamo by General Santa Anna and the Mexican army.

On September 19, 2019, about 1 million pounds of scaffolding originally attached to the nearby AT&T building (which was undergoing renovations) collapsed onto the parish house of St. Mark's, causing significant roof and water damage and resulting in intensive renovation of the parish house.
