= Everett Holland Jones =

American bishop (1902–1995)

The Right Reverend Everett Holland Jones
- Bishop of West Texas
- Church: Episcopal Church
- Diocese: West Texas
- Elected: May 18, 1943
- In office: 1943-1968
- Predecessor: William Theodotus Capers
- Successor: Harold Gosnell

Orders
- Ordination: June 1926 (deacon); July 1927 (priest) by William Theodotus Capers
- Consecration: September 24, 1943 by Henry St. George Tucker

Personal details
- Born: June 9, 1902 San Antonio, Texas, United States
- Died: November 18, 1995 (aged 93) San Antonio, Texas, United States
- Denomination: Anglican
- Parents: Richard Clarence Jones & Enid Holland
- Spouse: Helen Miller Cameron (m. 1940)
- Children: 1

Everett Holland Jones (June 9, 1902 – November 18, 1995) was the fourth bishop of West Texas in The Episcopal Church.

== Early life and education ==
Jones was born on June 9, 1902, in San Antonio, Texas, to Richard Clarence Jones and Enid Holland. He was educated at the state High School in San Antonio and then attended the University of Texas from where he graduated with a Bachelor of Arts in 1922. He also studied at the Virginia Theological Seminary and earned a Bachelor of Divinity in 1927. He was awarded an honorary Doctor of Divinity in 1943 by the University of the South and another from the Virginia Theological Seminary. Trinity University also awarded him a Doctor of Law.

== Ordained ministry ==
Jones was ordained deacon in June 1926 in St Mark's Church, and then priest in July 1927 through the hands of Bishop William Theodotus Capers of West Texas. He was rector of Grace Church in Cuero, Texas, between 1927 and 1930, and then rector of St Paul's Church in Waco, Texas, from 1930 until 1938. He was appointed Canon Chancellor of the cathedral chapter of Washington National Cathedral in 1938 and subsequently rector of St Mark's Church in San Antonio, where he remained until 1943. While at St Mark's he founded the Ecumenical Center for Religion and Health, a chapter of Alcoholics Anonymous, and the Good Samaritan Center.

== Bishop ==
On May 18, 1943, Jones was elected Bishop of West Texas and was consecrated on September 24, 1943, at St Mark's Church in San Antonio by Presiding Bishop Henry St. George Tucker. During his episcopacy, he founded Cathedral House, later renamed the Bishop Jones Center, as the diocesan headquarters. He was also influential in his ministry amongst the Hispanic population of the diocese. He retired on December 31, 1968. He married Helen Miller Cameron on November 25, 1940, and together had one child. He died on November 18, 1995, in San Antonio following a long illness.
