= Claude E. Payne =

American Episcopal bishop

The Right Reverend Claude E. Payne
- Bishop of Texas
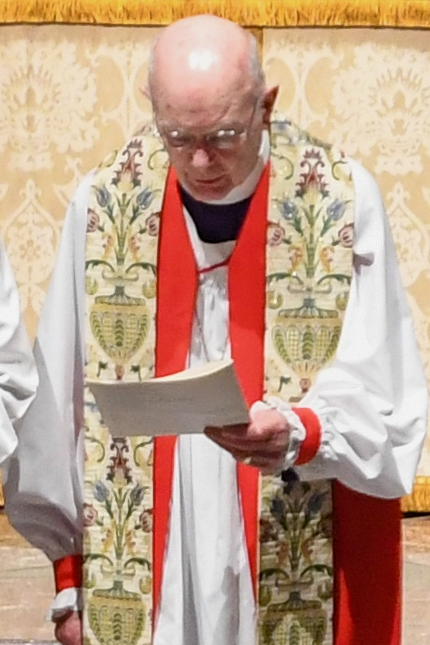
- Payne at the funeral of George H. W. Bush in Houston, December 2018
- Church: Episcopal Church
- Diocese: Texas
- Elected: June 18, 1993
- In office: 1995-2003
- Predecessor: Maurice M. Benitez
- Successor: Don A. Wimberly

Orders
- Ordination: 1964
- Consecration: October 9, 1993 by Edmond L. Browning

Personal details
- Born: June 19, 1932 (age 93) Abilene, Texas, United States
- Denomination: Anglican
- Spouse: Barbara Payne

Claude Edward Payne (born June 19, 1932) was the seventh Bishop of the Episcopal Diocese of Texas in The Episcopal Church between 1995 and 2003.

== Early life and education ==
Claude Payne was born on June 19, 1932, in Abilene, Texas. He earned a bachelor's degree in chemical engineering from Rice University in Houston and went to work for Union Carbide. He later enrolled at Church Divinity School of the Pacific in Berkeley, California and obtained a Master of Divinity degree in 1964.

== Ordained ministry ==
He initially served as assistant at Epiphany Church in Kingsville, Texas and chaplain at the Texas A&M University–Kingsville. Later he became assistant priest at St Mark's Church in Hudson, Texas, before becoming rector of St Mark's Church in Beaumont, Texas. Between 1964 and 1975, Payne was also assistant to Bishop Scott Bailey. Payne served as the second Rector of St. Martin's Episcopal Church in Houston, Texas from 1983 to 1993. As rector of St. Martin's, Payne was the parish priest of George H. W. and Barbara Bush.

== Bishop and retirement ==
On June 18, 1993, Payne was elected Coadjutor bishop of Texas on the sixth ballot, during a special convention held in Christ Church Cathedral. He was then consecrated bishop on October 9, 1993, at the George R. Brown Convention Center by Presiding Bishop Edmond L. Browning. He succeeded as diocesan bishop of Texas in 1995. Soon after he became diocesan bishop, Payne rededicated Christ Church Cathedral on September 17, 1995, after a major renovation. After his retirement in 2003, Payne moved from Houston to Salado, Texas. In 2013, he received an honorary Doctor of Divinity degree from the Seminary of the Southwest in Austin, Texas. He is married to Barbara Payne.

In 2018, Payne participated in the Houston funeral services for first Barbara and then George H. W. Bush.

== Bibliography ==
He is the co-author (with Hamilton S. Beazley) of Reclaiming the Great Commission: A Practical Model for Transforming Denominations and Congregations (2000) and the author of Reclaiming Christianity: A Practical Model for Spiritual Growth and Evangelism (2018).

== See also ==
- List of Episcopal bishops of the United States
- Historical list of the Episcopal bishops of the United States

Episcopal Church (USA) titles
Preceded by Maurice M. Benitez	7th Bishop of Texas; 1995 – 2003	Succeeded by Don A. Wimberly
