= C. Andrew Doyle =

American Episcopal bishop (born 1966)

The Right Reverend Charles Andrew Doyle
- Bishop of Texas
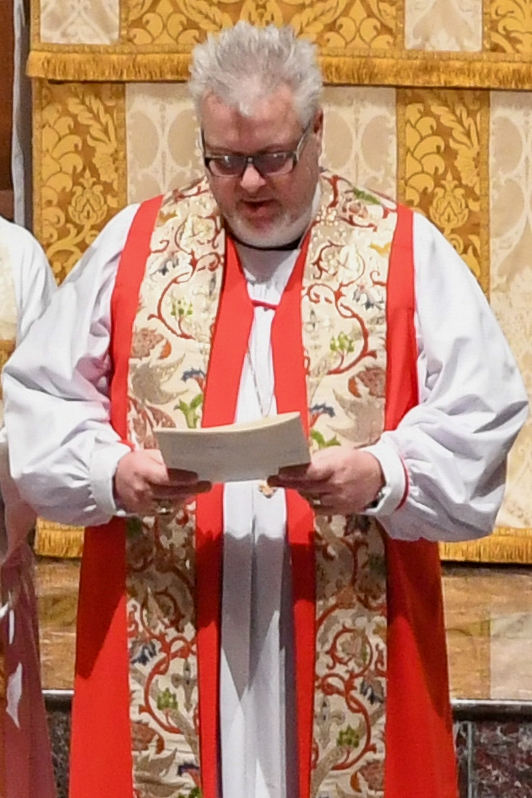
- Church: Episcopal Church
- Diocese: Texas
- Elected: May 24, 2008
- In office: 2009–present
- Predecessor: Don Wimberly
- Previous post: Coadjutor Bishop of Texas (2008-2009)

Orders
- Ordination: 1995 (deacon); 1996 (priest)
- Consecration: November 22, 2008 by Katharine Jefferts Schori

Personal details
- Born: May 31, 1966 (age 60) Carbondale, Illinois, United States
- Denomination: Anglican
- Spouse: JoAnne Doyle
- Children: 2

Charles Andrew Doyle, commonly known as C. Andrew Doyle or Andy Doyle, is an American Episcopal bishop, author, and theologian. He has served as the ninth bishop of the Episcopal Diocese of Texas since 2009. He was elected bishop coadjutor in May 2008 and consecrated on November 22, 2008, succeeding Don A. Wimberly as diocesan bishop in June 2009.

Beyond the diocese, Doyle chairs the board of the Episcopal Health Foundation, serves as Sub-Prelate of the U.S. Priory of the Order of St John, and leads the Diocese of Texas AI Task Force. A trained foresight practitioner through the Institute for the Future, he is a doctoral candidate at the University of Chester, where his research concerns the theology of George Berkeley.

== Biography ==
Doyle was born in 1966 in Carbondale, Illinois, and grew up in Houston, Texas. He studied fine arts at the University of North Texas, receiving a Bachelor of Fine Arts in 1990 before pursuing theological education at Virginia Theological Seminary. He received his Master of Divinity in 1995. Virginia Theological Seminary and the University of the South (Sewanee) later awarded him honorary doctorates.

Doyle was ordained a deacon at Trinity Episcopal Church, Houston, in 1995 and a priest at Christ Episcopal Church, Temple, in 1996. He served as assistant rector of Christ Church, Temple, from 1995 to 1997, and then as vicar of St. Francis Episcopal Church in College Station until 2003.

In 2003, Doyle joined the staff of the Diocese of Texas as Canon to the Ordinary under Bishop Don A. Wimberly. He held the position for approximately five years before his election as bishop coadjutor.

== Episcopacy ==
=== Election and consecration ===
On May 24, 2008, Doyle was elected on the fourth ballot as bishop coadjutor of the Episcopal Diocese of Texas. He was chosen from a field of six nominees, receiving 264 of 481 votes in the lay order and 128 of 247 votes in the clergy order. Doyle was consecrated on November 22, 2008, at St. Martin's Episcopal Church in Houston. Presiding Bishop Katharine Jefferts Schori served as chief consecrator. He succeeded Wimberly as diocesan bishop and was seated as the ninth Bishop of Texas on June 7, 2009, at Christ Church Cathedral in Houston.

=== Ministry in the Diocese of Texas ===
During Doyle's episcopate, the Episcopal Diocese of Texas introduced initiatives in evangelism, education, congregational development, and administration. In 2009, he introduced a strategic plan covering evangelism, service, stewardship, formation, leadership, and connection.

Doyle expanded clergy and lay education through the Iona Initiative, established in 2012. The diocese also undertook the "Unity in Mission" process concerning disagreements over same-sex marriage and LGBTQ+ inclusion. In 2016, the Diocesan Council removed Canon 43, which had defined marriage as between a man and a woman.

During Doyle's episcopate, the Diocese of Texas undertook several major financial and institutional initiatives. The diocesan chronology records the 2012 sale of St. Luke's Health System and the establishment of endowment and foundation structures intended to support clergy benefits, mission work, church growth, and campus ministry. In 2013, the Episcopal Health Foundation was launched. Doyle chairs the foundation's board.

Racial justice and reconciliation

In 2019, Doyle led an effort to establish a racial-justice initiative within the Diocese of Texas. The diocesan chronology records the initiative as a $13 million program announced in February 2020 at the 171st Diocesan Council. Presiding Bishop Michael Curry praised the initiative.

Church planting and missional communities

Beginning in the late 2010s, Doyle's episcopate included church planting and the development of missional communities. By 2020, the diocese reported 16 new churches and 80 missional communities. In 2021, it launched Vision 2025, focusing on congregational revitalization, digital ministries, and church-school partnerships. In 2022, the Episcopal Diocese of North Texas reunited with the Diocese of Texas following a two-year process.

=== Later ministry ===
In 2023 and 2024, Doyle's diocesan work included initiatives concerning record keeping, creation care, insurance, strategic planning, and digital communication. In 2024, the diocese began developing a strategic plan for 2030, involving the Institute for the Future, McKinsey & Company, and clergy in a strategic-foresight process.

In March 2025, Doyle visited the Episcopal Church of Liberia, including Cuttington University, and participated in its 89th Diocesan Convention. In November 2025, he responded to the detention of a Kenyan-born priest of the diocese by U.S. immigration authorities and said the priest was legally working.

In 2026, the diocese established the Diocesan Creation Care Conservancy to hold 117 acres of Camp Allen in Grimes County for conservation, education, and related purposes.

=== Wider church ===
Doyle has served as a deputy to several General Conventions, as a member of the Episcopal Church's Structure Committee, and as president of the Compass Rose Society, a network of patrons supporting the ministry of the Anglican Communion. He coaches newly consecrated bishops and attended the 2022 Lambeth Conference. He has partnered with Presiding Bishop Sean Rowe on strategic-foresight work for the Episcopal Church.

== Writing and theology ==
Doyle has written books on Episcopal identity, Christian community, church leadership, discipleship, liturgy, and contemporary culture. His books include Unabashedly Episcopalian: Proclaiming the Good News of the Episcopal Church (2012), A Generous Community: Being the Church in a New Missionary Age (2015), Small Batch: Local, Organic, and Sustainable Church (2016), The Jesus Heist: Recovering the Gospel from the Church (2017), Vocātiō: Imaging a Visible Church (2018), Citizen: Faithful Discipleship in a Partisan World (2020), and Embodied Liturgy: Virtual Reality and Liturgical Theology in Conversation (2021).

In 2022, Doyle edited Episcopate: The Role of Bishops in a Shared Future, a collection addressing the role of bishops in the Episcopal Church and Anglican Communion. His later books include Unabashed Faith: Resisting Anti-Spiritual Influences in the Modern World (2025) and Wrestling with Angels and Demons: Prayers at Faith's Edge (2025). In 2026, he published AI and Global Impact for the Anglican Communion Science Commission and co-authored Disciplines of Hope with Bob Johansen and Jeremy Kirshbaum.

== Personal life ==
Doyle is married to JoAnne Doyle; they have two children, Caisa and Zoë. He is an avid reader and fly fisherman.Doyle is also a painter and trained mediator, and is fluent in Spanish. He plays the banjo. His theological writing has examined Christianity's relationship with contemporary culture, including technology, politics, community, and public life.

== See also ==
- List of Episcopal bishops of the United States
- Historical list of the Episcopal bishops of the United States

Episcopal Church (USA) titles
Preceded by Don A. Wimberly	9th Bishop of Texas; 7 June 2009 – present	Incumbent
