= J. Milton Richardson =

American bishop

The Right Reverend James Milton Richardson
- Bishop of Texas
- Church: Episcopal Church
- Diocese: Texas
- Elected: December 4, 1964
- In office: 1965-1980
- Predecessor: John E. Hines
- Successor: Maurice Benitez

Orders
- Ordination: July 9, 1939 by Henry J. Mikell
- Consecration: February 10, 1965 by John E. Hines

Personal details
- Born: January 8, 1913 Sylvester, Georgia, United States
- Died: April 24, 1980 (aged 67) Hudson, Texas, United States
- Buried: Memory Hill Cemetery
- Denomination: Anglican
- Parents: James Milton Richardson & Palacia Stewart
- Spouse: Eugenia Preston Brooks (m. 1940)
- Children: 4

James Milton Richardson (January 8, 1913 - March 24, 1980) was bishop of the Episcopal Diocese of Texas from 1965 to 1980. A graduate of Emory University, the University of Georgia, and Virginia Theological Seminary, he was consecrated on February 10, 1965.

== Early life and education ==
Richardson was born in Sylvester, Georgia on January 8, 1913, the son of James Milton Richardson and Palacia Stewart. He was educated at the Lanier Middle School in Buford, Georgia. He then studied at the University of Georgia, graduating with a Bachelor of Arts in 1934 and then at Emory University from where he earned a Bachelor of Divinity in 1936 and a Master of Arts in 1942. He also graduated from the Virginia Theological Seminary in 1938. He was awarded an honorary Doctor of Laws from John Marshall Law School in 1948, and a Doctor of Divinity from the Episcopal Theological Seminary in Kentucky in 1960, the University of the South in 1961, the Virginia Theological Seminary in 1965, and the Seminary of the Southwest in 1976. He married Eugenia Preston Brooks on June 14, 1940, and together they had four children.

== Ordained ministry ==
Richardson was ordained deacon on July 17, 1938 and priest on July 9, 1939 by Bishop Henry J. Mikell of Atlanta. He initially served as minister in charge of St Timothy's Church in Atlanta, Georgia between 1938 and 1940, and then as assistant rector of St Luke's Church in Atlanta, Georgia from 1940 to 1943. He was elected rector of St Luke's in 1943 and remained there until 1952, when he became Dean of Christ Church Cathedral in Houston, Texas.

== Bishop ==
During the 115th Annual Council of the Diocese of Texas on December 4, 1964, Richardson was elected Bishop of Texas. He was consecrated bishop on February 10, 1965 in Christ Church Cathedral. His episcopacy saw an increase in the number of Episcopalians in the diocese. He died in office on March 24, 1980 in Houston, Texas.
