= Dena Harrison =

The Right Reverend Dena A. Harrison
- Suffragan Bishop of Texas
- Church: Episcopal Church
- Diocese: Texas
- Elected: April 29, 2006
- In office: 2006-2019

Orders
- Ordination: 1988
- Consecration: October 7, 2006 by D. Bruce MacPherson

Personal details
- Born: Texas, United States
- Denomination: Anglican (prev. Disciples of Christ)
- Spouse: Larry
- Children: 2

Dena A. Harrison is an American prelate of the Episcopal Church who served as suffragan bishop of the Episcopal Diocese of Texas between 2006 and 2019.

== Biography ==
Harrison was born and raised in Texas and raised in a Disciples of Christ congregation. She was educated at Stark High School from which she graduated in 1964. She then attended the University of Texas at Austin and graduated in 1967 after which she worked as a commercial mortgage broker. She later joined the Episcopal Church and studied at the Seminary of the Southwest, earning a Master of Divinity in 1987. She was ordained deacon in 1987 and priest in 1988. She then served as assistant rector of All Saints’ Church in Austin, Texas, rector of St James’ Church in La Grange, Texas, rector of the Church of St James the Apostle in Conroe, Texas, and then as Canon to the Ordinary between 2000 and 2006 and Archdeacon of the Diocese of Texas from 2003 to 2006.

She was elected Suffragan Bishop of Texas on the third ballot on April 29, 2006 during the convention held in Christ Church Cathedral. Prior to this election she was nominated several times before but failed to get the needed majority. She was then consecrated bishop on October 7, 2006 with Bishop D. Bruce MacPherson of Western Louisiana as chief consecrator. As bishop she helped develop safeguarding training for the diocese. She retired in 2019. Harrison is married to her husband Larry and together have two children.

== See also ==
- List of Episcopal bishops of the United States
- Historical list of the Episcopal bishops of the United States
