= Gordon T. Charlton Jr. =

American Episcopal bishop (1923–2020)

The Right Reverend Gordon T. Charlton
- Suffragan Bishop of Texas
- Church: Episcopal Church
- Diocese: Texas
- Elected: March 7, 1982
- In office: 1982–1989

Orders
- Ordination: January 1950 by Clinton S. Quin
- Consecration: August 28, 1982 by John Allin

Personal details
- Born: September 29, 1923 San Antonio, Texas, U.S.
- Died: February 1, 2020 (aged 96) Irvington, Virginia, U.S.
- Denomination: Anglican
- Parents: Gordon Taliaferro Charlton & Enid Lynn Jones
- Spouse: Landon Cutler Crump (m. 1948; died 1996)
- Children: 3

Gordon Taliaferro Charlton Jr. (September 29, 1923 – February 1, 2020) was an American prelate of the Episcopal Church who served as Suffragan Bishop of Texas between 1982 and 1989.

== Early life and education ==
Charlton was born on September 29, 1923, in San Antonio, Texas, to Gordon Taliaferro Charlton and Enid Lynn Jones. He was educated at the school in Alamo Heights, Texas, and at Schreiner Institute in Kerrville, Texas. He then graduated with a Bachelor of Arts from the University of Texas at Austin in 1944 and then a Master of Divinity from the Virginia Theological Seminary in 1949. He was awarded an honorary Doctor of Divinity from the Virginia Seminary in 1974. During World War II he served in the US Navy for three years as an ensign attached to a subchaser in the Pacific theater.

== Ordained ministry ==
Charlton was ordained deacon on July 5, 1949, at St Mark's Church, in San Antonio by his uncle Bishop Everett Holland Jones of West Texas. He was then ordained priest in January 1950 by Bishop Clinton S. Quin of Texas. He initially served as assistant rector of St James' Church in Houston between 1949 and 1951, before becoming rector of St Matthew's Church in Fairbanks, Alaska. In 1954, he became personnel secretary of the Overseas department at the National Council of the Episcopal Church in New York City, while in 1958, he became the rector of Christ Church in Mexico City. He returned to the United States in 1963 and became rector of St Andrew's Church in Wilmington, Delaware. Between 1967 and 1973, he was responsible for the new field education program and was assistant dean of the Virginia Theological Seminary, and then became dean of the Seminary of the Southwest in 1972, a post he retained until 1982.

== Episcopal Church ==
Charlton was elected Suffragan Bishop of Texas on March 7, 1982, during the fourth ballot of the special council which took place in Christ Church Cathedral. He was consecrated on August 28, 1982, by Presiding Bishop John Allin. He retired in 1989 and worked as Secretary of the Episcopal Church's General Board of Examining Chaplains administering the National General Ordination Exam. He died on February 1, 2020, in Irvington, Virginia.
