= William E. Sterling =

The Right Reverend William Elwood Sterling
- Suffragan Bishop of Texas
- Church: Episcopal Church
- Diocese: Texas
- Elected: May 5, 1989
- In office: 1989-1999

Orders
- Ordination: June 19, 1958 by James Clements
- Consecration: September 9, 1989 by Edmond L. Browning

Personal details
- Born: February 7, 1927 Houston, Texas, United States
- Died: June 28, 2005 (aged 78) Houston, Texas, United States
- Buried: Forest Park Cemetery, Houston
- Denomination: Anglican
- Parents: Norman Sterling & Mabel Hewitt
- Spouse: Evelyn Taylor (m. 1949; died 2003)
- Children: 2

William Elwood Sterling (February 7, 1927 – June 28, 2005) was an American Episcopalian bishop who served as the 6th suffragan bishop of the Episcopal Diocese of Texas from September 1989 to February 1999.

== Early life and education ==
Sterling was born on February 7, 1927, in Houston, Texas, to Norman Sterling and Mabel Hewitt. Both of his parents died in their hundreds, his father at the age of 102, and his mother at the age of 104. He was educated at the San Jacinto High School in Houston, after which he served in the US Navy during World War II. After the war he resumed his education and studied at the University of Houston and graduating in 1949 with a Bachelor of Arts in management. He then worked as a Bank teller at the Houston Branch of the Federal Reserve Bank of Dallas and later as a safety engineer and payroll auditor for the American Surety Company of Houston. After some time he was employed as a manufacturer's representative of hotel and restaurant supplies by Raleigh W. Johnson Company. Sterling left the world of business and enrolled in a theology course at the Seminary of the Southwest from where he graduated in 1957.

== Ordained ministry ==
Sterling was ordained deacon on June 18, 1957, and priest on June 19, 1958, by Suffragan Bishop James Clements of Texas. He initially was in charge of St Mark's Church in Rosenberg, Texas, and Grace Church in Houston. Between 1960 and 1966, he was rector of St Paul's Church in Freeport, Texas, while from 1966 until 1977, he served as vicar of Church of the Good Shepherd in Friendswood, Texas. In 1977, Good Shepherd became a parish church and he thus became its first rector, a position he held until 1989. He also held a number of diocesan positions.

== Bishop ==
On May 5, 1989, Sterling was elected Suffragan Bishop of Texas on the seventh ballot and was consecrated on September 9, 1989, with Presiding Bishop Edmond L. Browning as chief consecrator. He remained in office until his retirement in February 1999. He then became Bishop-in-Residence at Trinity Church in Houston, and served there until his death on June 28, 2005, as a result of cancer.
