= F. Percy Goddard =

Bishop of the Episcopal Diocese of Texas

The Right Reverend Frederick Percy Goddard
- Suffragan Bishop of Texas
- Church: Episcopal Church
- Diocese: Texas
- Elected: May 6, 1955
- In office: 1955-1972

Orders
- Ordination: April 1928 by Clinton S. Quin
- Consecration: August 6, 1955 by Clinton S. Quin

Personal details
- Born: December 8, 1903 Seymour, Connecticut, United States
- Died: June 7, 1983 (aged 79) Marlin, Texas, United States
- Buried: Calvary Cemetery in Marlin
- Denomination: Anglican
- Parents: Frederick Goddard & Louisa Marshall
- Spouse: May Selena Bennett (m. 1928)
- Children: 2
- Education: Yale University

Frederick Percy Goddard (December 8, 1903 - June 7, 1983) was an American prelate of the Episcopal Church, who served as Suffragan Bishop of Texas from 1955 until 1972.

== Early life and education ==
Goddard was born on December 8, 1903, in Seymour, Connecticut, to Frederick Goddard and Louisa Marshall. He was educated at the Seymour high school, graduating in 1920, and then commenced studies at Yale University, from where he earned a Bachelor of Philosophy in 1924. He then pursued training for the ordained ministry at Berkeley Divinity School, and graduated with a Bachelor of Divinity in 1927. He also briefly studied at the Toynbee Institute of International Affairs in London in 1927. He was awarded an honorary Doctor of Sacred Theology by Berkley in 1954, and a Doctor of Divinity in 1957 by the University of the South.

== Ordained ministry ==
Goddard was ordained deacon in June 1927 by Bishop Edward Campion Acheson of Connecticut and the priest in April 1928 by Bishop Clinton S. Quin of Texas. Soon after, he married May Selena Bennett on September 8, 1928, and together had two children. He served his priesthood as rector of St John's Church in Marlin, Texas, from 1928 until 1955. Goddard was also involved in numerous diocesan positions, notably president of the standing committee between 1947 and 1949, and deputy to the general conventions of 1937, 1943, 1946, 1952, and 1955. He was also editor of the Texas Churchman between 1930 and 1937.

== Bishop ==
On May 6, 1955, Goddard was elected Suffragan Bishop of Texas and was consecrated bishop on August 6, 1955, at Christ Church Cathedral by Bishop Clinton S. Quin of Texas. He retained the post until his retirement in 1972. He died on June 7, 1983, in Marlin, Texas.
