= James Clements (bishop) =

The Right Reverend James Parker Clements
- Suffragan Bishop of Texas
- Church: Episcopal Church
- Diocese: Texas
- Elected: April 13, 1956
- In office: 1956-1960

Orders
- Ordination: September 25, 1940 by Clinton S. Quin
- Consecration: August 29, 1956 by Henry Knox Sherrill

Personal details
- Born: August 8, 1911 Revere, Massachusetts, United States
- Died: June 6, 1977 (aged 65) Houston, Texas, United States
- Denomination: Anglican
- Parents: Henry Chester Clements & Elizabeth Maude Duggin
- Spouse: Helen Elizabeth Marie Jacobson (m. 1941; div. 1960) Mary Jane Clements (m. 1966–1977)
- Children: 3
- Education: Baylor University

James Parker Clements (August 8, 1911 - June 6, 1977) was an American prelate of the Episcopal Church, who served as Suffragan Bishop of Texas from 1956 until 1960.

== Early life and education ==
Clements was born in Revere, Massachusetts on August 8, 1911, the son of Henry Chester Clements and Elizabeth Maude Duggin. He was educated at the high school in Revere and then attended Baylor University from where he graduated with a Bachelor of Arts in 1936. He then studied at the Virginia Theological Seminary, graduating in 1939 with a Bachelor of Divinity. He married Helen Elizabeth Marie Jacobson on April 22, 1941 and together had two children. The couple divorced in 1960.

== Ordained ministry ==
Clements was ordained deacon in July 1939 and priest on September 25, 1940 by Bishop Clinton S. Quin of Texas. He served as minister-in-charge of St George's Church in Texas City, Texas between 1939 and 1942 and then as rector of All Saints Church in Austin, Texas from 1942 until 1943. During WWII he served as chaplain in the United States Navy Reserve, commencing his service on February 19, 1943 until January 2, 1946. He then returned to parish ministry and became rector of Christ Church in Tyler, Texas until 1950 when he became rector of St Mark's Church in Houston, Texas.

== Bishop ==
Clements was elected bishop twice, first in 1949 as Suffragan Bishop of Minnesota, however, he declined the election. He was then elected Suffragan Bishop of Texas on April 13, 1956 and this time he accepted. He was consecrated on August 29, 1956 in Christ Church Cathedral by Presiding Bishop Henry Knox Sherrill. Clements' episcopacy as Suffragan Bishop ended with his resignation in November 1960 after sending a resignation letter to the House of Bishops. He officially resigned on December 31, 1960 and no reasons were given. He later served as Assistant Bishop in Texas and died of cancer in Houston on June 6, 1977.
