= William Cox (bishop) =

American Episcopalian bishop (1921–2025)

The Right Reverend William J. Cox
- Suffragan Bishop of Maryland
- Church: Episcopal Church; Southern Cone; Anglican Church in North America
- Diocese: Diocese of Maryland
- In office: 1972–1980
- Other posts: Assistant Bishop of Oklahoma (1980–1988); Assistant Bishop of Texas (1988–1991)

Orders
- Ordination: 1957 (diaconate); 1958 (priesthood)
- Consecration: 1972 by Harry Lee Doll

Personal details
- Born: January 24, 1921 Valeria, Wolfe County, Kentucky, U.S.
- Died: January 17, 2025 (aged 103) Broken Arrow, Oklahoma, U.S.
- Education: Virginia Theological Seminary

William Jackson Cox (January 24, 1921 – January 17, 2025) was an American Episcopalian bishop. Made a bishop in 1972, he served first as suffragan bishop of the Episcopal Diocese of Maryland and then as assistant bishop of the Episcopal Diocese of Oklahoma. A theological conservative within the Episcopal Church, in his retirement, he played a role in the Anglican realignment. Cox performed ordinations and confirmations without the permission of Episcopal bishops, resulting in his deposition from ministry in 2008 and his affiliation with the Anglican Province of the Southern Cone and eventually the Anglican Church in North America.

== Early life and military service ==
Cox was born in 1921 in Valeria, Kentucky. In 1929, the Cox family sold their farm and moved to Middletown, Ohio, where his parents worked in a paper mill. Cox married Betty Drake on December 20, 1941, and was drafted into the U.S. Army in April 1942. Due to poor eyesight, Cox was deployed in stateside assignments in the Army Medical Corps and the Supply and Logistics Division, rising to the rank of captain and working at the Pentagon by the end of World War II. After the war, Cox was discharged in 1947.

After the war, the Coxes moved to Nebraska, where Cox co-founded AM radio station KBRL in McCook. While there, he was invited to Christmas Eve mass at the local Episcopal church, which he later described as a "life-changing experience." Called up to serve during the Korean War, Cox returned to work in supply and logistics at the Pentagon. The Cox family began attending All Hallows Church in Maryland, where they were baptized. He was later assigned to the U.S. Embassy in London, where he and his family attended a local Anglican church. After this assignment, Cox resigned as a major but continued to serve in the Army Reserve.

== Ordained ministry ==
In 1954, Cox enrolled in Virginia Theological Seminary. He graduated and was ordained as a deacon in 1957 and as a priest in 1958. His first cure was two small mission churches—one white, one black—in Cumberland, Maryland. He merged these two churches into the integrated Church of the Holy Cross in 1960.

=== Episcopacy ===
In 1972, Cox was an elected suffragan bishop in the Diocese of Maryland. Based in Frederick, he primarily served congregations in the rural Appalachian western region of the diocese. He was also chaplain the Sisters of the Covenant in Catonsville and an advocate for Episcopal church planting and growth in Appalachia as president of the church's Appalachian Peoples Service Organization. He also chaired the General Convention's Standing Commission on the Church in Small Communities.

In 1980, Cox accepted a call from Gerald N. McAllister to serve as assistant bishop in the growing Diocese of Oklahoma. He was offered the role under a newly adopted Episcopal Church canon that allowed bishops consecrated in another jurisdiction to be appointed by the ordinary without being elected as a suffragan with tenure or right of succession as a coadjutor. He was based in Tulsa. During his service as assistant bishop, he learned to fly and flew himself to episcopal visitations at far-flung parishes. During his time in Oklahoma, Cox deposed a priest at St. Michael's Episcopal Church in Broken Arrow for departing from the Episcopal Church and claiming the episcopal oversight of the Bishop of London.

After retiring from the Diocese of Oklahoma in 1988, Cox was called for three years as an assistant bishop in the Episcopal Diocese of Texas.

=== Anglican realignment ===
In 2003, after the election of Gene Robinson as a bishop resulted in a schism in the Episcopal Church, Cox was one of several bishops who objected to the theological direction of the church. In March 2004, he joined fellow retired bishops C. FitzSimons Allison, Maurice Benitez, Alex D. Dickson and William C. Wantland in performing confirmations and celebrating the Eucharist for dissident Episcopal congregations in the Diocese of Ohio without the permission of the local bishop. The action was rebuked by the Episcopal Church's House of Bishops. In June 2005, at the request of Church of Uganda Archbishop Henry Luke Orombi, he ordained three clergy and performed confirmations at Christ Church in Overland Park, Kansas, which had earlier that year negotiated its departure from the Diocese of Kansas.

Cox was invited to come under the primatial oversight of the Anglican Province of the Southern Cone. After this, in March 2008 the Episcopal House of Bishops declared that Cox had "repudiated the Doctrine, Discipline, and Worship of the Episcopal Church and has abandoned the Communion of the Church" through his episcopal actions in other dioceses and voted to depose him from ministry.

== Later life and death ==
Cox lived in the Tulsa area in retirement, where he was a member of the Anglican Church of the Holy Spirit in the ACNA's Diocese of the Living Word. His wife died in 2009. Cox died on January 17, 2025, a week shy of his 104th birthday.
