= Don Wimberly =

The Right Reverend Don Adger Wimberly
- Bishop of Texas
- Church: Episcopal Church
- Diocese: Texas
- Elected: June 15, 2002
- In office: 2003–2009
- Predecessor: Claude E. Payne
- Successor: C. Andrew Doyle
- Other post: Assistant Bishop of Atlanta
- Previous posts: Coadjutor Bishop of Lexington (1984-1985); Bishop of Lexington (1985-1999); Assistant Bishop of Texas (1999-2002); Coadjutor Bishop of Texas (2002-2003)

Orders
- Ordination: December 1971 by Harold B. Robinson
- Consecration: September 22, 1984 by John Allin

Personal details
- Born: June 10, 1937 (age 89) Baton Rouge, Louisiana, US
- Denomination: Anglican (prev. Methodist)
- Parents: Herbert Wright Wimberly & Mary Elizabeth Adger
- Spouse: Edwina Aileen Jones
- Children: 2
- Education: Louisiana State University

Don Adger Wimberly (born June 10, 1937) was chancellor of the University of the South in Sewanee from 1997 to 2003. He also served as Bishop of Lexington and then Bishop of Texas in The Episcopal Church.

== Early life and education ==
Wimberly was born on June 10, 1937, in Baton Rouge, Louisiana, the son of Herbert Wright Wimberly and Mary Elizabeth Adger. He was raised as a Methodist. He studied at the Louisiana State University where he graduated with a Bachelor of Arts in business and economics in 1959. He also attended the Paul M. Hebert Law Center for two years, before serving in the military. He spent five years as a corporate analyst for Kerr-McGee in Oklahoma City. While in the army, he considered joining the Episcopal Church, an action which saw him enrolling for a Master of Divinity at the Virginia Theological Seminary. he graduated in 1971.

== Ordained ministry ==
Wimberly was ordained deacon in June 1971 by Bishop Iveson B. Noland of Louisiana, and priest in December of the same year by Bishop Harold B. Robinson of Western New York. After ordination, he served as curate at Calvary Church in Williamsville, New York, while in 1972, assisted at St James' Church in Baton Rouge, Louisiana. In 1974, he moved to Overland Park, Kansas to become rector of Christ Church. Later, between 1978 and 1984, he served as Dean of St John's Cathedral in Jacksonville, Florida. In 1976, represented the Episcopal Diocese of Kansas as deputy at the General Convention, and did the same for the Episcopal Diocese of Florida at the 1979 convention.

== Bishop of Lexington ==
In June 1984, Wimberly was elected Coadjutor Bishop of Lexington and consecrated on September 22, 1984, in Immanuel Baptist Church, Lexington, Kentucky, by Presiding Bishop John Allin. He succeeded as diocesan in November 1985 and remained in Lexington till his resignation in 1999 to become Diocesan Missioner of the Diocese of Texas. During his time in Lexington, women were allowed to be ordained to the priesthood and the cathedral status was transferred back to Christ Church. In addition, the diocesan camp and Conference Center and the Cathedral Domain in Lee County were expanded. In 1997, he was elected chancellor of Sewanee: The University of the South, a post he retained till 2003.

== Bishop of Texas ==
On June 15, 2002, Wimberly was elected Coadjutor Bishop of Texas on the third ballot. He succeeded as diocesan in 2003. As Bishop of Texas, he oversaw the establishment of the permanent diaconate and bi-vocational priests. he also moved the diocesan offices in downtown Houston. Moreover, two new churches were built in the diocese and nine missions became parishes. On February 14, 2009, he announced his intention to retire and transferred diocesan responsibilities to the Coadjutor Bishop of Texas C. Andrew Doyle. He retired on June 6, 2009, and became Assistant Bishop of Atlanta.

He is currently a member of Communion Partners, an Episcopalian group which opposed the 77th General Episcopal Convention's decision to authorize the blessing of same-sex marriages in 2012. The measure to allow the blessing of same-sex unions won by a 111–41 vote with 3 abstentions.

== See also ==
- List of Episcopal bishops of the United States
- Historical list of the Episcopal bishops of the United States
