= Charles Doyle =

Charles Doyle may refer to:

- Charles Hastings Doyle (1804–1883), British soldier and lieutenant governor of Nova Scotia and New Brunswick
- Charles Altamont Doyle (1832–1893), British illustrator, watercolourist and civil servant
- Charles William Doyle (1770–1842), British Army officer
- C. Andrew Doyle (born 1966), bishop of Texas
