= Roger Howard Cilley =

Suffragan bishop of the Episcopal Diocese of Texas

The Right Reverend Roger Howard Cilley
- Suffragan Bishop of Texas
- Church: Episcopal Church
- Diocese: Texas
- Elected: 1975
- In office: 1976-1985

Orders
- Ordination: June 1957 by John E. Hines
- Consecration: March 20, 1976 by John Allin

Personal details
- Born: May 22, 1918 Corning, New York, United States
- Died: September 26, 1986 (aged 68) San Antonio, Texas, United States
- Buried: Trinity Episcopal Cemetery, Galveston, Texas
- Denomination: Anglican
- Spouse: Louise
- Children: 2

Roger Howard Cilley (May 22, 1918 – September 26, 1986) was a suffragan bishop of the Episcopal Diocese of Texas.

== Early life and education ==
Cilley was born in Corning, New York, on May 22, 1918. He studied at New York University from which he graduated with a Bachelor of Arts in 1947 and a Master of Arts in 1949. Between 1951 and 1953, Cilley was an Assistant Professor of Drama at the University of Texas, after which he decided to enroll at the Seminary of the Southwest where he trained for the priesthood and earned his Master of Divinity in 1956. He was also awarded an honorary Doctor of Divinity by the seminary and the University of the South.

== Ordained ministry ==
Cilley was ordained deacon in July 1956 and priest in June 1957 by Bishop John E. Hines of Texas. He initially served as assistant and later as rector of St Thomas' Church in College Station, Texas, between 1956 and 1958, and episcopal chaplain at the Agricultural and Mechanical College of Texas. In 1958, he was appointed rector of Holy Comforter in Angleton, Texas, where he remained until his transfer to Trinity Church in Galveston, Texas, in 1962. While at Trinity, he also undertook several posts within the diocese and served as a deputy to six General Conventions. Cilley was also involved as a consultant to the Prayer Book Revision Committee between 1967 and 1973.

== Episcopacy ==
In 1975, Cilley was elected Suffragan Bishop of Texas and was consecrated on March 20, 1976, with Presiding Bishop John Allin as chief consecrator. He remained in office until his retirement in 1985. Cilley died a year later in San Antonio on September 26 when attending the interim House of Bishops meeting.
