= Jeff W. Fisher =

The Right Reverend Jeff W. Fisher
- Suffragan Bishop of Texas
- Church: Episcopal Church
- Diocese: Texas
- Elected: June 2, 2012
- In office: 2012-present

Orders
- Ordination: 2004
- Consecration: October 6, 2012 by Katharine Jefferts Schori

Personal details
- Born: 1964 (age 61–62) Houston, Texas, United States
- Denomination: Anglican
- Spouse: Susan
- Children: 2

Jeff Wright Fisher (born 1964) is an American bishop of the Episcopal Church. He is the current suffragan bishop of the Episcopal Diocese of Texas.

Fisher was born in Houston, Texas, in 1964 and was baptized at the Church of St John the Divine in Houston. He studied at the University of Texas after which he was chief financial officer for Hand Benefits & Trust, Inc. in Houston. Later he studied at the Virginia Theological Seminary where he earned a Master of Divinity degree in 2004. He was awarded an honorary Doctor of Divinity degree in 2013. He was ordained a deacon and priest in 2004. He was associate rector at St. Mary's Church in Cypress, Texas, from 2004 to 2006, and then rector of St. Alban's Church in Waco, Texas, from 2006 to 2012.

Fisher was elected Suffragan Bishop of Texas at Christ Church Cathedral, on June 2, 2012, and was consecrated bishop at the Caldwell Auditorium in Tyler, Texas, on October 6, 2012. Presiding Bishop Katharine Jefferts Schori was chief consecrator. He is responsible for the eastern region of the Diocese of Texas and is based in Tyler. He is married to Susan and they have two adult sons, Scott and John.

== See also ==
- List of Episcopal bishops of the United States
- Historical list of the Episcopal bishops of the United States
