= Leopoldo J. Alard =

American bishop

The Right Reverend Leopoldo J. Alard
- Suffragan Bishop of Texas
- Church: Episcopal Church
- Diocese: Texas
- Elected: May 12, 1995
- In office: 1995-2003

Orders
- Ordination: 1968
- Consecration: September 9, 1995 by Edmond L. Browning

Personal details
- Born: March 11, 1941 Havana, Cuba
- Died: October 15, 2003 (aged 62) Houston, Texas, United States
- Buried: St. John the Divine, Houston
- Denomination: Anglican
- Spouse: Aida
- Children: 2

Leopoldo Jesus Alard (March 11, 1941 – October 15, 2003) was an American bishop. He was suffragan bishop of the Episcopal Diocese of Texas from 1995 to 2003.

== Early life and education ==
Alard was born on March 11, 1941, in Havana, Cuba. His great-grandmother was a founding member of the Episcopal Church of Cuba. In 1961, he and his family fled Cuba and sought sanctuary in the United States. He studied at Stetson University and graduated with a Bachelor of Arts degree in history, and later at the Episcopal Theological Seminary of the Caribbean in Puerto Rico from where he graduated with a Master of Divinity degree in 1967. He also studied in Switzerland and at the University of the South. He was awarded an honorary doctorate from the Seminary of the Southwest in 1996 and another from the University of the South in 2000.

== Ordained ministry ==
Alard was ordained a deacon in 1967 and priest in 1968. He then became vicar of St Mark's Church in Chattahoochee, Florida, while in 1972 he became the rector of St John's Church in Homestead, Florida. In 1986 he was appointed as canon for Hispanic ministries and director of the Center for Hispanic Ministries of Province VII. In 1995 he also became canon for multicultural ministries in the Diocese of Texas.

== Bishop ==
On May 12, 1995, Alard was elected Suffragan Bishop of Texas and he was consecrated on September 9, 1995, with Presiding Bishop Edmond L. Browning as chief consecrator at the chapel of Episcopal High School in Houston. He was the first Hispanic to be elected bishop in the Episcopal Church within the United States. His episcopacy is noted for his role in representing the church to the Latino community and for his support for the ordination of women. In July 2003, he was placed in intensive care after suffering from liver disease for numerous months and resigned as suffragan bishop. On October 15, 2003, Alard died while awaiting a liver transplant. His funeral was held on October 25 at Christ Church Cathedral.
