= Maurice Benitez =

American bishop

The Right Reverend Maurice Benitez
- Bishop of Texas
- Church: Episcopal Church
- Diocese: Texas
- Elected: June 13, 1980
- In office: 1980-1995
- Predecessor: J. Milton Richardson
- Successor: Claude E. Payne

Orders
- Ordination: 1959
- Consecration: September 13, 1980 by John Allin

Personal details
- Born: January 23, 1928 Washington, D.C., United States
- Died: February 27, 2014 (aged 86) Austin, Texas, United States
- Buried: St John the Divine Church, Houston
- Denomination: Anglican
- Parents: Enrique Manuel Benitez & Blossom Compton
- Spouse: Joanne Dossett (m. 1949; died 2012)
- Children: 3

Maurice Manuel "Ben" Benitez (January 23, 1928 - February 27, 2014) was sixth bishop of the Episcopal Diocese of Texas, serving from 1980 to 1995.

== Early life and education ==
Benitez was born on January 23, 1928, in Washington, D.C., to Enrique Manuel Benitez (1891-1971) and Blossom Compton (1897-1960). He was educated in army schools depending where his father who was a colonel in the US Army was stationed. These included bases in Virginia, Kansas, and the Panama Canal Zone. He also attended the Miami Beach Senior High School and the Columbian Preparatory School in Washington, D.C., after which he enrolled at the United States Military Academy from where he graduated with a Bachelor of Science in 1949.

== Military career ==
Benitez completed flight training in Texas, after which he was stationed at Williams Air Force Base in 1950. While there he commenced training to fly jet fighters. Prior to this he married Joanne Dossett on December 18, 1949. Later, he was transferred to Munich in West Germany where he served in the 527th Bombardment Squadron for three years. Prior to his discharge from military service he was a test pilot at the Air Proving Ground Command, Eglin Air Force Base.

== Ordained ministry ==
Benitez enrolled at the University of the South in 1955 to study for the priesthood, and earned a Bachelor of Divinity in 1958. He was also awarded an honorary Doctor of Divinity in 1973 by the same university. He was ordained deacon in 1958 and priest in 1959 in the Diocese of Florida. He served as Priest-in-Charge of St James' Church in Lake City, Florida, between 1958 and 1961, when he was appointed canon resident at St John's Cathedral in Jacksonville, Florida. In 1962, he became rector of Grace Church in Ocala, Florida, where he remained until 1968 after becoming rector of Christ Church in San Antonio, Texas. Between 1974 and 1980 he was rector of the Church of St John the Divine in Houston, Texas.

== Bishop ==
On June 13, 1980, Benitez was elected on the eighth ballot as Bishop of Texas during a day-long session of the diocesan council held in Christ Church Cathedral. He was consecrated bishop on September 13, 1980, in the Albert Thomas Convention Center with Presiding Bishop John Allin as chief consecrator. During his episcopacy seven new Hispanic congregations and the El Buen Samaritano Mission in Austin were established. He was also instrumental in founding the Episcopal High School in Bellaire, Texas. His views were diverse. He was in favor of the ordination of women to the priesthood and racial integration but remained conservative in his Biblical views. He was a member of the Irenaeus Fellowship, which tried to counteract the liberal direction the Episcopal Church was taking in the 1980s. He retired in 1995 and moved to Austin, Texas. He died on February 27, 2014, in Austin, Texas.
