= John E. Hines =

American Episcopalian bishop

The Most Reverend John E. Hines
- 22nd Presiding Bishop of the Episcopal Church
- Church: Episcopal Church
- In office: 1965–1974
- Predecessor: Arthur C. Lichtenberger
- Successor: John Allin
- Previous post: Bishop of Texas (1955-1965)

Orders
- Ordination: October 28, 1934 by William Scarlett
- Consecration: October 18, 1945 by Henry St. George Tucker

Personal details
- Born: October 10, 1910 Seneca, South Carolina, United States
- Died: July 19, 1997 (aged 86) Austin, Texas, United States
- Denomination: Anglican
- Parents: Edgar Alphonso Hines & Mary Woodbury Moore
- Spouse: Helen Louise Orwig (m. 1935)
- Children: 5

John Elbridge Hines (October 3, 1910 – July 19, 1997) was a bishop in the Episcopal Church in the United States. When he was elected the 22nd Presiding Bishop in 1965, at the age of 54, he was the youngest person to hold that office, which he held until 1974. Desmond Tutu, Archbishop of Cape Town, said Hines' movement to divest church-held assets in that nation played an important role in the demise of apartheid.

== Early life ==
Hines was born in Seneca, South Carolina. He graduated from the University of the South in 1930 and Virginia Theological Seminary in Alexandria in 1933.

== Ministry ==
His ministry began at parishes in Hannibal, Missouri in the Great Depression, where he became acquainted with the Social Gospel movement through bishop William Scarlett of Missouri. At age 26, Hines became rector of Saint Paul's Church, Augusta, Georgia, and began attacking racism in Georgia, continuing his lifelong defense of those who lacked political, social, economic and educational opportunities. Hines then accepted a call to become rector of Christ Church in Houston, Texas from 1941 to 1945, which was later raised to the status of cathedral.

Hines was consecrated as bishop coadjutor of the Episcopal Diocese of Texas on October 18, 1945, and in 1955 became diocesan bishop. While his social activism was criticized in some quarters, the number of churches grew under his stewardship. He became known as a theological conservative and social liberal, and was elected Presiding Bishop of the Episcopal Church in 1965. Hines responded to the riots following the assassination of Martin Luther King Jr. by calling for social justice and self-determination, and launched the controversial General Convention Special Program.

In 1966, he expressed "vigorous support" for programs of population control, and noted that the Episcopal Church sponsored 15 birth control clinics in the U.S. and abroad. During his tenure, the church faced budgetary challenges necessitating staff layoffs.

== Death and legacy ==
During nearly two decades of retirement in North Carolina, Hines preached most summers at the Church of the Good Shepherd in Cashiers, North Carolina, where he was ultimately buried next to his wife, Helen Orwig, who died a year before he did. They were survived by four sons and a daughter. Hines died at Heartland Medical Center in Austin, Texas.

== See also ==
- List of presiding bishops of the Episcopal Church in the United States of America
- List of Episcopal bishops of the United States
- Historical list of the Episcopal bishops of the United States

Episcopal Church (USA) titles
Preceded by Arthur C. Lichtenberger	22nd Presiding Bishop; January 1, 1965 – May 31, 1974	Succeeded by John Allin
Preceded by Clinton Simon Quin	4th Bishop of Texas; 1955–1964	Succeeded by James Milton Richardson
