= St. Stephen's Episcopal School Houston =

Location
- 1800 Sul Ross Street; Houston, Texas, Texas 77098; United States; 29.738059°N 95.404842°W

Information
- Religious affiliation: Episcopal
- Established: 1934
- Head of School: Troy Roddy (2024 to present)
- Enrollment: 158 (2020-21)
- Colors: Teal, Gold, and Purple
- Mascot: Bulldog

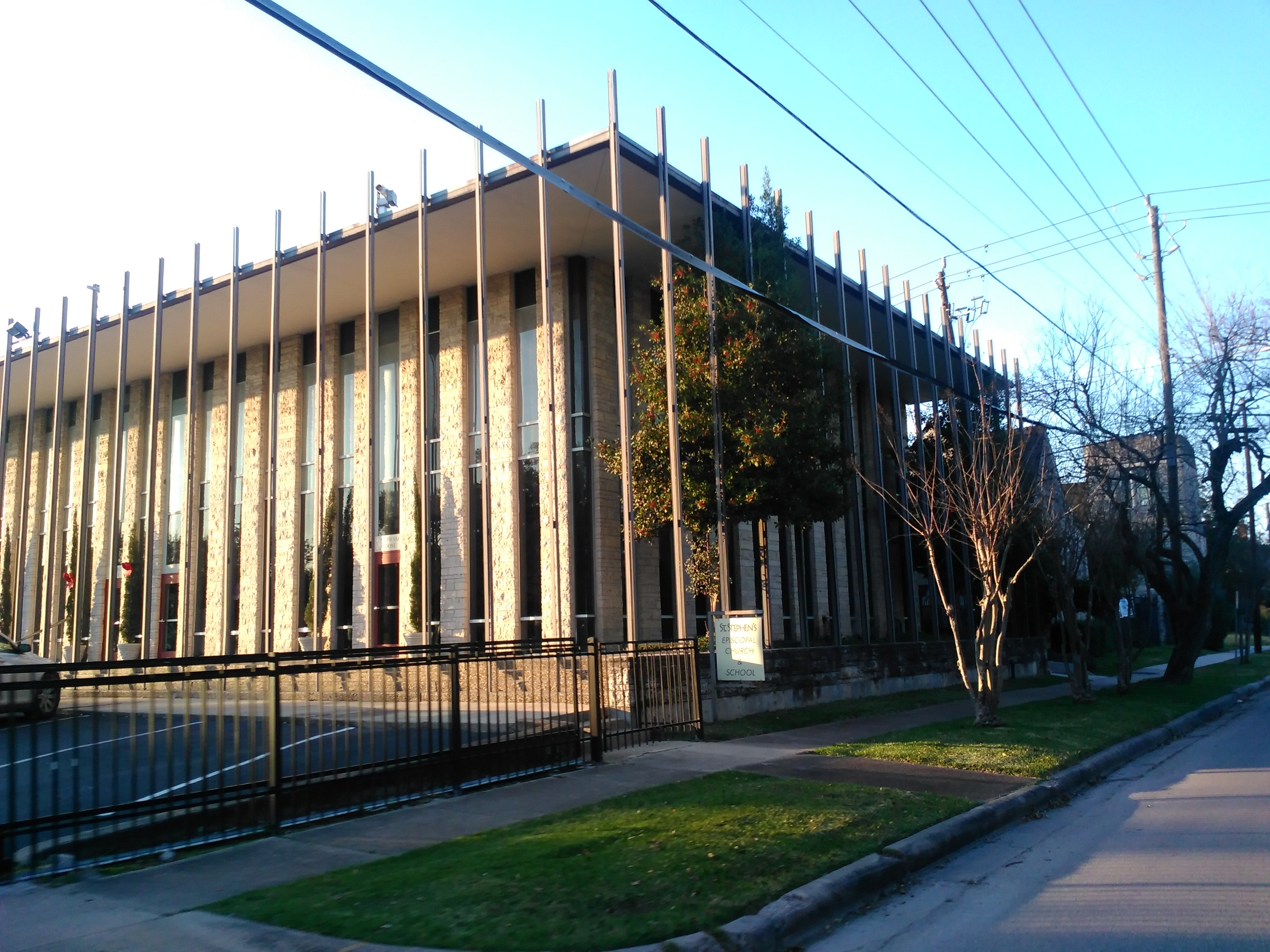
St. Stephen's Episcopal Church and School

St. Stephen's Episcopal School of Houston (SSESH), founded in 1934, is a small private school located in Houston, Texas. The school currently admits children from the age of fifteen months to the age of fourteen years (15 months to 8th grade).

The school is associated with the St. Stephen's Episcopal Church, which incorporates a weekly church service into the students' agenda.

The school previously had a senior high school section.

== Lower school ==
The lower school of St. Stephen's ranges from fifteen months, the orientation program, to twelve years, upper elementary.

== Middle school ==
The St. Stephen's Middle School was established in 1991.

The middle school curriculum includes computer skills, creative and factual writing, fine arts, language arts, mathematics, physical fitness, science, social studies, and Spanish.

== Trips ==
During the school year, classes ranging from 1st grade to 8th grade, through school funding, take trips to different parts of the country. Grades first through sixth, on different occasions, go to Camp Allen for a three-day period. In addition, fourth, fifth and sixth graders go to The Outdoor School for four days. During the two-year program, the middle school (seventh and eighth graders) go to Mo Ranch, Belize, and Washington D.C. for a five- to six-day period.

In addition, St. Stephen's students take field trips to Jones Hall and other music venues in Houston, Texas. Public transportation is usually utilized on these field trips, to preserve the environment.

== See also ==
- Montessori method
  - Camp Champions
  - Mo Ranch
- Christianity in Houston
