= Clinton S. Quin =

Bishop of the Episcopal Diocese of Texas

The Right Reverend Clinton Simon Quin
- Bishop of Texas
- Church: Episcopal Church
- Diocese: Texas
- Elected: May 16, 1918
- In office: 1928-1955
- Predecessor: George Herbert Kinsolving
- Successor: John E. Hines
- Previous post: Coadjutor Bishop of Texas (1918-1928)

Orders
- Ordination: December 21, 1908 by Charles E. Woodcock
- Consecration: October 31, 1918 by Daniel S. Tuttle

Personal details
- Born: September 28, 1883 Louisville, Kentucky, United States
- Died: November 29, 1956 (aged 73) Hudson, Texas, United States
- Denomination: Episcopal
- Spouse: Hortense Pilcher (m. 1909)
- Children: 4

Clinton Simon Quin (September 28, 1883 – November 29, 1956) was bishop of the Episcopal Diocese of Texas from 1928 to 1955, having been consecrated coadjutor on October 31, 1918.

== Early life and education ==
Quin was born in Louisville, Kentucky, on September 28, 1883, the son of Joseph B. Quin and Nettie Eleanor Jones. His father was a pharmacist. He was baptized in the Episcopal Church in 1888 and confirmed in 1898. After receiving his preliminary education under private tutors, he studied at the University of Louisville and graduated with Bachelor of Laws in 1904. He then worked for the Louisville Gas Company until September 1905 when he gave up his job and entered the Virginia Theological Seminary from where he graduated in 1908. He married Hortense Pilcher on June 1, 1909, and together had four children.

== Ordained ministry ==
Quin was ordained deacon on June 21, 1908, and priest on December 21, 1908, by Bishop Charles E. Woodcock of Kentucky. He then became rector of St James' Church in Pewee Valley, Kentucky, and was responsible for the missions in Shelbyville, Kentucky, and La Grange, Kentucky, between 1908 and 1911. He then became rector of Grace Church in Paducah, Kentucky, where he remained until 1917. He then shortly served as rector of Trinity Church in Houston, Texas, between 1917 and 1918.

== Bishop ==
At the Diocesan Council held in Trinity Church on May 16, 1918, Quin was elected coadjutor bishop of Texas and was consecrated on October 31, 1918, by Presiding Bishop Daniel S. Tuttle. He succeeded as diocesan bishop on October 23, 1928, and remained in office until his retirement in 1955. His plan for a nonsegregated General Convention in Houston could not overcome the objections of other delegations, and the convention was moved to Honolulu. His episcopacy was well known for an increase in church membership, and its success in youth work and in recruiting young men for the ministry. He was also instrumental in the founding of Camp Allen. He died on November 29, 1956, at St Luke's Hospital in Houston, Texas.
