= Seminary of the Southwest =

Episcopal seminary in Austin, Texas, US

Coordinates: 30.293161°N 97.732539°W

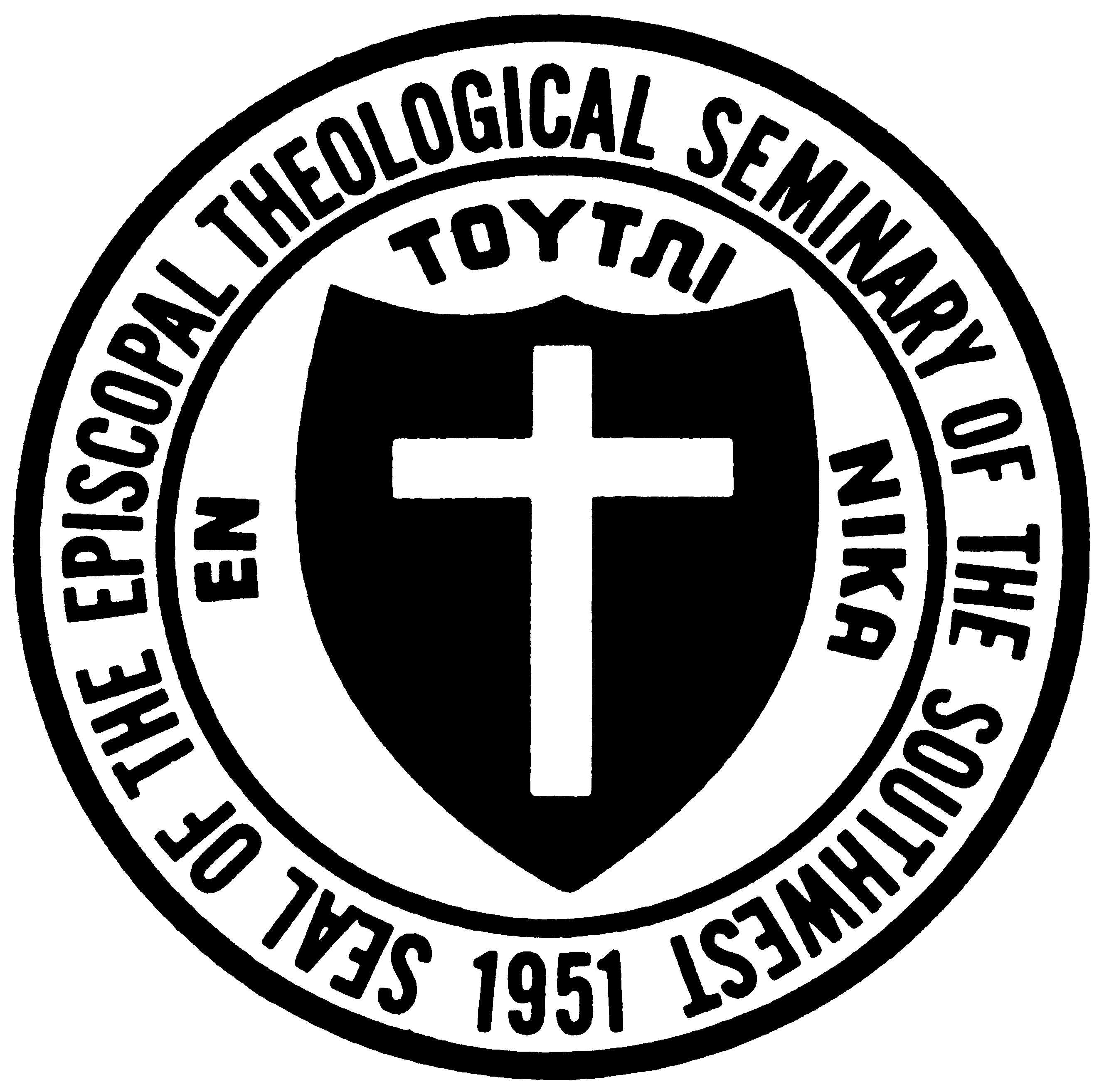
- Other names: The Episcopal Theological Seminary of the Southwest; SSW
- Type: Seminary
- Established: 1951
- Founders: John E. Hines
- Religious affiliation: Episcopal Church (United States)
- Endowment: $55 million
- Budget: $8 million
- Dean: Diane M. Jardine Bruce
- Students: 114 (2015–16)
- Location: Austin, Texas, USA
- Campus: 7.5 acres
- Website: ssw.edu

Seminary of the Southwest (The Episcopal Theological Seminary of the Southwest and informally SSW) is an Episcopal seminary in Austin, Texas. It is one of nine accredited seminaries of The Episcopal Church in the United States. Seminary of the Southwest forms Christian leaders pursuing ordination within the church, as well as those interested in lay forms of ministry, including chaplaincy and clinical mental health counseling.

== History ==
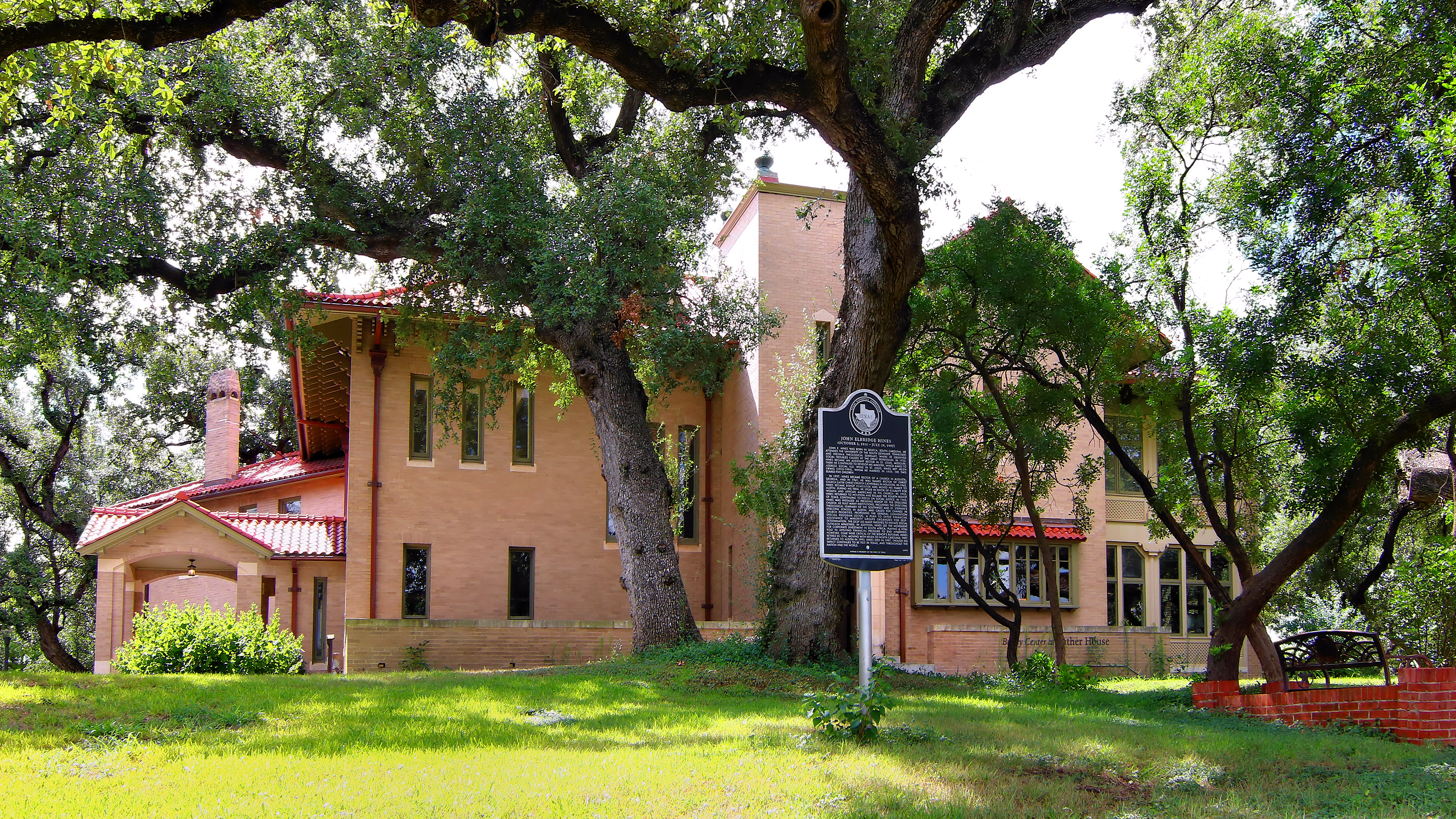
Bailey Center at Rather House on the campus of the Seminary of the Southwest

The Episcopal Theological Seminary of the Southwest was founded in 1952 during a period of tremendous growth in the church. Bishop John E. Hines, coadjutor of the Episcopal Diocese of Texas, began this institution as "seminary for the whole church" to accommodate the overflow of enrollment in the other established Episcopal seminaries. The seminary received a charter from the state of Texas in 1951 and was recognized as an agency of the Diocese of Texas in January 1952. It originated in the central and low church traditions of the church.

Three clergymen served as the initial instructors: Gray M. Blandy, instructor at the Canterbury Bible Chair and chaplain of Episcopal students at the University of Texas at Austin; Lawrence Brown, Bible Chair instructor at the Agricultural and Mechanical College of Texas (now Texas A&M University) at College Station; and John M. Holt, vicar of the mission church at Mexia. Blandy was also the seminary's first dean.

In 1954, a five-acre land donation enabled the construction of its campus, which was completed in the early 1970s with the gift of the historic Rather House.

Following a period of instability within the Episcopal Church during the 1960s, Seminary of the Southwest faced lower enrollment in the 1970s. One response was the introduction of cross-cultural theological education through the new Center for Hispanic Ministries to strengthen the Church's Hispanic population in the region.

In 1976, the Episcopal Church officially approved the ordination of women as priests to take effective January 1, 1977; Susan Buell became Seminary of the Southwest's first female graduate to be ordained in 1978. The next year saw nine women enrolling for ordination studies, accounting for about a third of the total entering class.

The mid-1980s brought a revised curriculum and the introduction of lay theological education for non-ordained individuals. In 1988, Seminary of the Southwest tried a new approach to fundraising by requesting financial support from alumni; today the school has one of the highest percentages of alumni support of all US seminaries.

In 1994, several new campus facilities were dedicated: auditorium, bookstore, community center, dining hall, guest housing; in 2003, a building with new faculty offices and classrooms was completed.

The seminary changed its name from the Episcopal Theological Seminary of the Southwest adopted the name Seminary of the Southwest in an effort to re-brand and better market itself in the face of dwindling enrollment. The new name, Seminary of the Southwest, was launched as part of a new brand identity campaign along with a new website. The Episcopal Theological Seminary of the Southwest remains the business name.

== Academics ==
Seminary of the Southwest is licensed by the Texas Higher Education Coordinating Board to award master's degrees in divinity, spiritual formation, religion, spiritual direction, and clinical mental health counseling. The seminary holds three certificates of accreditation, including by the Southern Association of Colleges and Schools Commission on Colleges (SACSCOC), by the Commission on Accrediting of Association of Theological Schools in the United States and Canada, and by The Council for Accreditation of Counseling & Related Educational Programs (CACREP).

The seminary belongs to the Council of Southwestern Theological Schools and the American Theological Library Association.

Seminary of the Southwest is one of several official US Episcopal Church seminaries.

The seminary offers Master of Divinity and Master of Arts programs as well as a diploma program and continuing education courses and workshops. Between 2001 and 2025, Seminary of the Southwest trained eight percent of Episcopal priests.

== Campus ==
=== Christ Chapel ===
The chapel, including the floor-to-ceiling hand-blown stained glass windows, was designed by architect Arthur Fehr.

=== Harrison Library ===
In September, 2023, Southwest completed the reconstruction of its library, named for Bishop Dena Harrison. On site, holdings of the Harrison Library include more than 150,000 items, with several thousand in Spanish. The collection provides nearly 500 print periodical titles as well. Ample resources relate to the major theological disciplines, including an abundance of materials concerned with the tradition and history of the Episcopal Church. The Harrison Library collaborates closely with the Stitt Library at Austin Presbyterian Theological Seminary, just a few blocks away. A slightly longer walk takes seminarians to the fifth largest library consortium in the United States, the General Libraries of the University of Texas at Austin, including their unequaled Benson Latin American Collection. All these libraries extend borrowing privileges to our students free of charge. The internet and the OCLC international network of libraries provide materials unavailable locally; and the library offers a growing number of electronic resources including ATLAS Full Text Plus, TexShare, and EBSCO.

=== Diocese of Texas regional office ===
The office of the West Region of the Episcopal Diocese of Texas is located on the campus of the Seminary of the Southwest.

== Loise Henderson Wessendorff Center for Christian Ministry and Vocation ==
The Loise Henderson Wessendorff Center for Christian Ministry and Vocation at Seminary of the Southwest is founded on the principal that God calls all Christians to the service of the Gospel. The mission of the center is to support Christians in discerning what it means to respond faithfully to God's call in their particular lives and circumstances. Through its programs and degrees, the Center provides educational opportunities for men and women from any denomination (or from a non-denominational community) to strengthen their knowledge of theology, scripture, and ethics, as well as pursue more specific training in chaplaincy, counseling, spiritual formation, youth ministry and Christian education.

A $2.5 million endowment in March 2013 enabled Seminary of the Southwest to expand the CCMV. The new center was dedicated in Fall 2013 under its new name, the Loise Henderson Wessendorff Center for Christian Ministry and Vocation.

== Leadership ==
Diane M. Jardine Bruce is interim dean and president of Seminary of the Southwest. Her appointment was made by the Board of Trustees in November 2025 and she assumed office on January 2, 2026. Benjamin J. King was appointed academic dean in spring 2025; he is also the Duncalf-Villavoso Professor of Church History.

The seminary is an instrumentality of the Episcopal Diocese of Texas within the Protestant Episcopal Church of the United States, a member of the worldwide Anglican Communion. Twenty-four trustees representing both lay and ordained leaders within and outside The Episcopal Church constitute its board of trustees.

== Notable people ==
=== Alumni ===
- Leopoldo J. Alard (1941−2003), Suffragan Bishop of Texas
- Roger Howard Cilley (1918−1986), Suffragan Bishop of Texas
- Angela Cortiñas, Bishop Suffragan of West Texas
- Bob Jones (born 1932), Bishop of Wyoming
- Dena Harrison, Suffragan Bishop of Texas
- Larry Maze (born 1943), Bishop of Arkansas
- Amy Dafler Meaux, Bishop of West Missouri
- Graham Pulkingham (1926−1993), priest and author
- David M. Reed (born 1957), Bishop of West Texas
- Gregory Rickel (born 1963), Bishop of Olympia
- Robert D. Rowley (1941−2010), Bishop of Northwestern Pennsylvania
- Kathryn McCrossen Ryan (born 1964), Suffragan Bishop of Texas
- Pat Spearman (born 1955), politician, cleric, veteran
- Martha Elizabeth Stebbins, Bishop of Montana
- William E. Sterling (1927−2005), Suffragan Bishop of Texas
- James Tengatenga (born 1958), Bishop of Southern Malawi
- William H. Wolfrum (1926−2007), Suffragan Bishop of Colorado

=== Faculty ===
- Gordon T. Charlton Jr. (1923−2020), dean
- Robert B. Hibbs (1932−2017), teacher
- Gerald N. McAllister (1923−2014), bishop-in-residence
- Russell Schulz-Widmar (born 1944), composer, author and conductor
- Danielle Tumminio Hansen (born 1981), professor of pastoral theology
