= Everett Titcomb =

Howard Everett Titcomb (30 June 1884 - 31 December 1968) was an American organist, choir-director and composer.

== Biography ==
Titcomb grew up in Salisbury Mills, Massachusetts as the son of butcher George Howard Titcomb (1844-1928) and Sarah Ella Prime (1850-1941).

He served as the organist-choirmaster at the Church of St. John the Evangelist, Boston from 1910 to 1959 and has been called a Boston church music institution

== Style and Works ==
Titcomb was a prolific composer for choir and organ. His music has been characterized by John Ogasapian in the following manner:

"Titcomb's style is sectional, with abrupt changes and frequent cadences. Within sections, melodies are simply structured and harmonized. The result is naive and scarcely arresting; yet the music lies well for the voice and is extremely effective, even when done by a choir of limited capability."

His popularity as a composer of choral anthems was noted by Fansler:

"The popularity of Titcomb's anthems resulted from their simple dignity. By means of full organ sonorities, Titcomb was able to please even the most sophisticated Episcopal congregation."

His anthems include “Behold Now Praise the Lord” and “O Love How Deep, How High, How Broad.”
