= Kathryn McCrossen Ryan =

Bishop of the Episcopal Church, US

The Right Reverend Kathryn McCrossen Ryan
- Suffragan Bishop of Texas
- Church: Episcopal Church
- Diocese: Texas
- Elected: February 22, 2019
- In office: 2019–present

Orders
- Ordination: June 25, 1993 by Charles F. Duvall
- Consecration: June 1, 2019 by Michael Curry

Personal details
- Born: December 1964 (age 61) Raton, New Mexico, United States
- Denomination: Anglican

Kathryn McCrossen Ryan (born December 1964) is an American bishop of the Episcopal Church. She is currently suffragan bishop of the Episcopal Diocese of Texas.

== Biography ==
Ryan was born in Raton, New Mexico, in December 1964 and was baptized at Holy Trinity Church in Raton, New Mexico. She studied at the University of the South where she graduated with a Bachelor of Arts degree in philosophy in May 1986. In 1988 and 1989 she served as director of Camp Stoney in Santa Fe, New Mexico. She then earned a Master of Divinity degree from the Seminary of the Southwest in May 1992.

Ryan was ordained deacon on June 27, 1992, by Bishop Terence Kelshaw of Rio Grande, when she was at All Saints' Church in Austin, Texas as a youth minister. She was ordained priest on June 25, 1993, by Bishop Charles F. Duvall of the Central Gulf Coast. In 1993 she became assistant priest at St. Luke's Church in Mobile, Alabama. In 1999 she was elected rector of the Church of the Ascension in Dallas, Texas. In 2014 she was appointed to serve as canon to the ordinary in the Episcopal Diocese of Texas, a position she held until her election as Suffragan Bishop of Texas on February 22, 2019. She was consecrated bishop in Westover Hills Church of Christ in Austin on June 1, 2019, by Presiding Bishop Michael Curry. She married Timothy Ryan on May 20, 1989, and they have two children.
