= St. Martin's Episcopal Church (Houston) =

Coordinates: 29.7611°N 95.4664°W

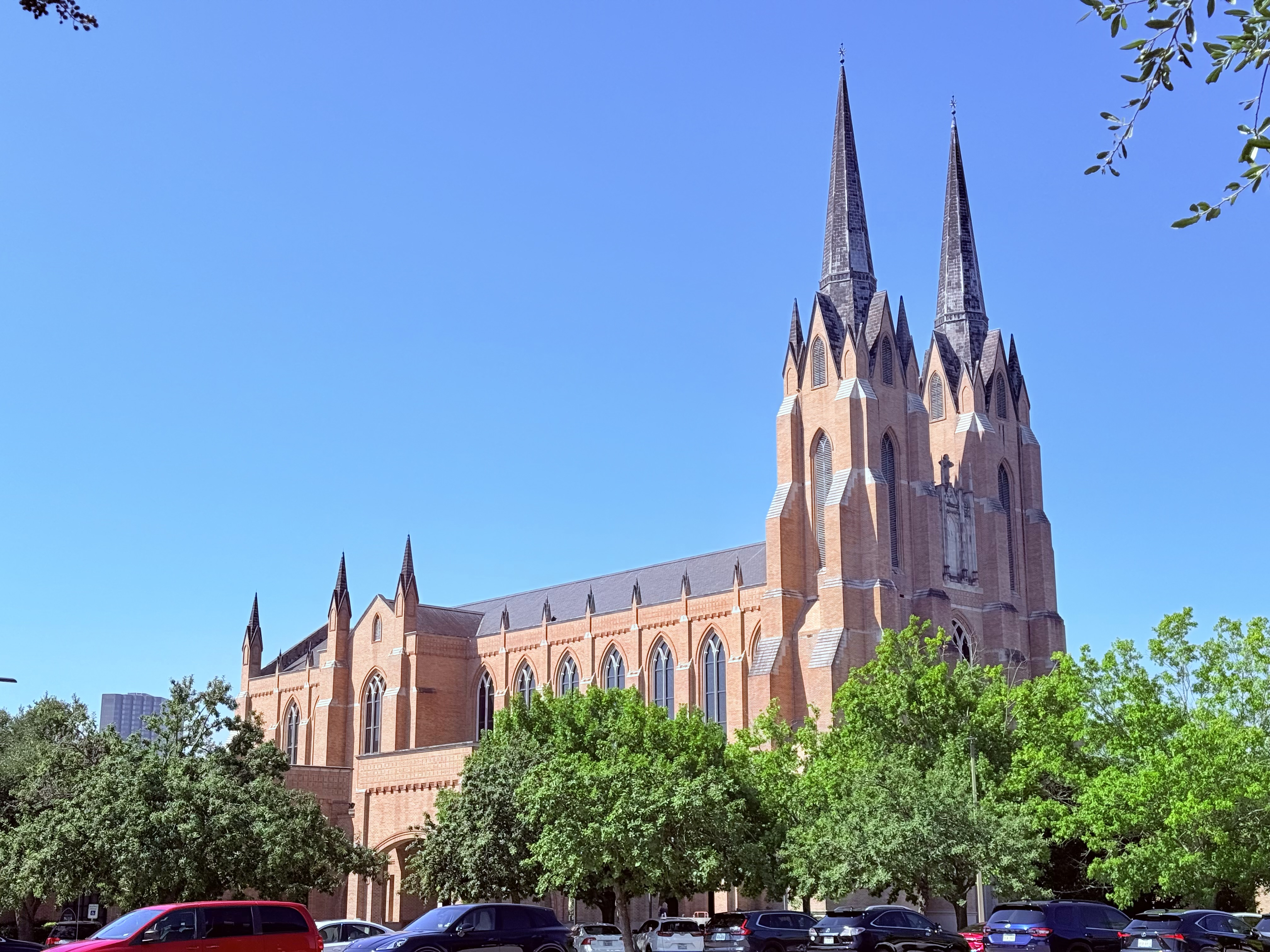
- St. Martin's Episcopal Church
- Location: Houston, Texas
- Country: United States
- Denomination: Episcopal Church
- Churchmanship: Low church
- Website: stmartinsepiscopal.org

History
- Status: Parish church
- Founded: 1952
- Founder: J. Thomas Bagby

Architecture
- Style: Gothic Revival

Administration
- Province: VII
- Diocese: Texas

Clergy
- Rector: Dane Boston

St. Martin's Episcopal Church in Houston, Texas was founded in 1952 by J. Thomas Bagby and is currently the largest parish of the Episcopal Church in North America with over 10,000 members. The Parish worships in both traditional and contemporary liturgical styles in the evangelical Anglican and mainline Anglican tradition. The church offers Christian education programs, as well as numerous outreach and missions opportunities, and a variety of programs and events for all ages.

== Campus ==
The church is located at 717 Sage Road just north of the Galleria. The campus is seven acres in area and the church spires are 188 feet high. The church was completed on 11 April 2004. It was designed by Jackson & Ryan Architects based on the Gothic St. Elizabeth's Church, Marburg, Germany. It has won numerous awards and been featured on the covers of three national magazines. Also on the campus are Founders' Hall (the first church building constructed in 1954), Old Church (second church building constructed in 1959), chapel, offices, classrooms, an activity center, library, Wayside Chapel and Cloister Garden. The Hope & Healing Center and Institute, along with the Scout Center and The Island youth center, opened in 2011.

== History ==
St. Martin's was founded on 7 September 1952 by J. Thomas Bagby. One hundred and twenty-five people attended the first service at a home belonging to the Hollyfield family on Post Oak Road. It was accepted as a self-supporting parish with 263 communicants in January 1953. Four acres of land on Sage Road were purchased in 1954 and the first church building was constructed. This building is now Founders' Hall. A large expansion was completed with new chapel, parlor, offices and classrooms in 1959. A new sanctuary was complete by March 29. This building is now Old Church. St. Martin's had grown to 2,791 baptized members by its tenth anniversary on 7 September 1962.

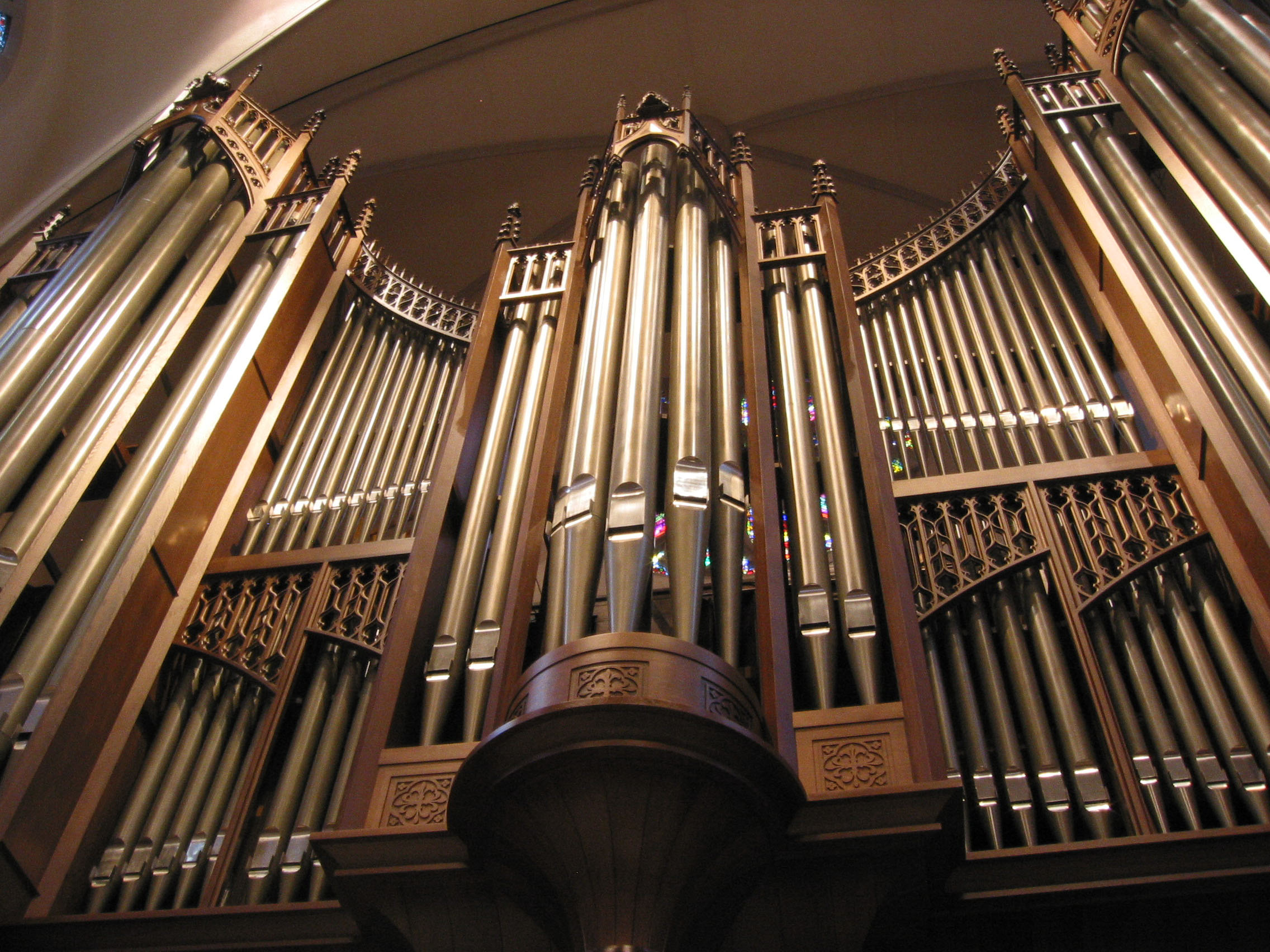
Schoenstein organ in St. Martin's Episcopal Church, Houston, Texas

An expansion took place in 1984, adding an Education Building, Library, and Choir Hall. In 1986, an activity center was opened. By the 1990s, the church had become one of the largest Episcopal churches in the United States, and by 2002, had grown to more than 7,000 members. Regular worship in the New Church (now renamed The Church) began with Easter services on 11 April 2004. A new Cloister Garden was dedicated on 29 April 2007. A new Garden of the Holy Cross – Riverway was consecrated and dedicated on 24 June 2007. A 15th-century museum-quality Altarpiece, a triptych depicting the life of St. Martin, was acquired in 2007. The Archbishop of Canterbury, George Carey, visited St. Martin's in January 2008. Three acres were acquired east of campus and the master planning process for its use began in spring 2008.

A "Building for Life" groundbreaking for new buildings, The Student Life Center, The Scout Center, and The Hope and Healing Center, took place on 10 April 2011. A Welcoming Christ tympanum was unveiled on 29 January 2012. St. Martin's acquired the 5005 Woodway property in spring 2012. George Carey presided the confirmation services on 10 May 2015.

The funeral of Gene Cernan, the last astronaut to walk on the Moon, was held in the church in January 2017. On 5 February 2017, Lady Gaga attended Mass, during which she listened to a sermon and received Holy Communion from the Rev. Sarah Condon at St. Martin's Episcopal Church, prior to her performance at the Super Bowl LI.

External videos
- Barbara Bush funeral service, St. Martin's Episcopal Church, Houston, Texas, April 21, 2018, C-SPAN

The funerals for former president George H. W. Bush and his wife Barbara Bush were both held at the church, Barbara Bush's on April 21, 2018 and George H. W. Bush's on December 6, 2018.

== Notable members ==
- Barbara Bush (Until her death on April 17, 2018. Her public viewing was held at the church on April 20, 2018, and her funeral was held there, the next day.)
- George H. W. Bush (Until his death on November 30, 2018. His public viewing was held at the church on December 5, 2018, and his funeral was held there, the next day.)
- James A. Baker III
