= Christ Episcopal Church Complex =

Historic church in Wisconsin, US

- Divine Temple Church of God (formerly Christ Episcopal Church Complex)
- U.S. National Register of Historic Places
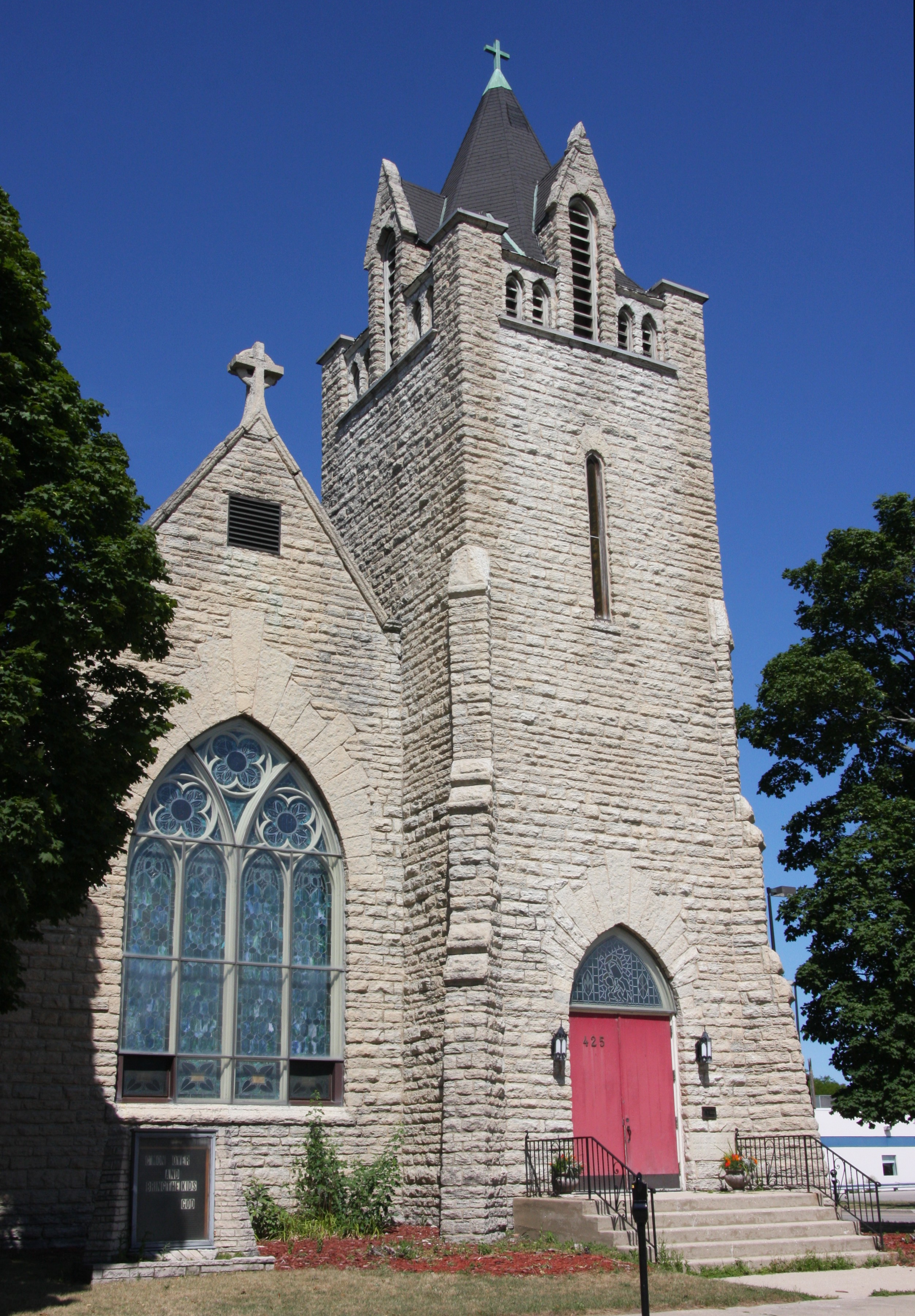
- The church in 2016

- Location within Wisconsin Location within the United States
- Location: 425 Cherry St., Green Bay, Wisconsin
- Coordinates: 44°51′41″N 88°0′11″W
- Built: 1900
- Architect: George A. Rockwell
- Architectural style: Late Gothic Revival
- NRHP reference No.: 12000852
- Added to NRHP: October 9, 2012

The Divine Temple Church of God is a church complex located in downtown Green Bay, Wisconsin. It was added to the National Register of Historic Places in 2012.

== History ==
Originally known as the Christ Episcopal Church Complex, the complex was constructed in the Gothic Revival style. The complex consists of the church, built 1899–1900; the rectory, built 1911; the school, built 1956–1957; and the 1990 parish hall.

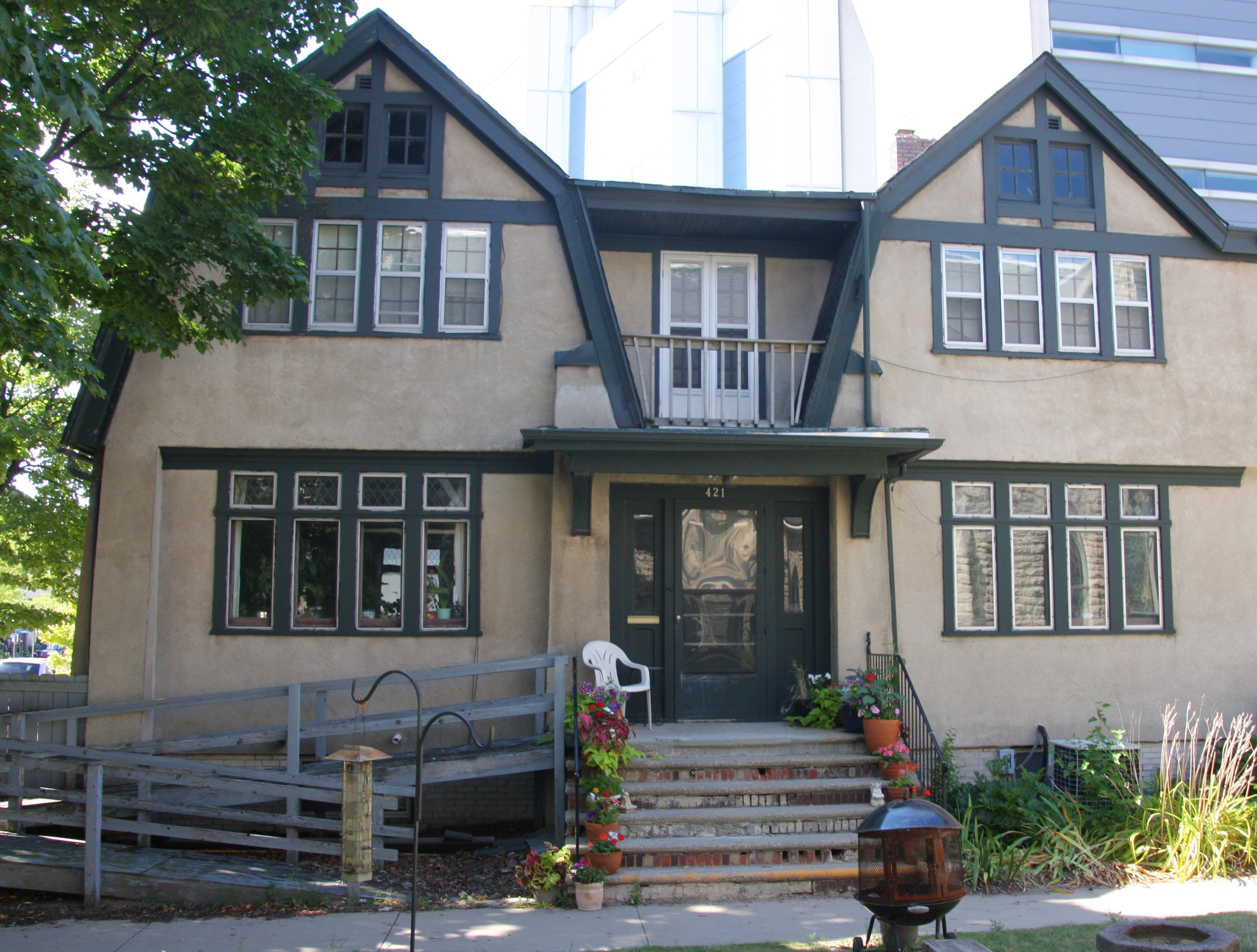
The 1911 rectory in 2016
