= Trinity Episcopal Church (Houston) =

Historic church in Texas, United States

Coordinates: 29.7396°N 95.3779°W

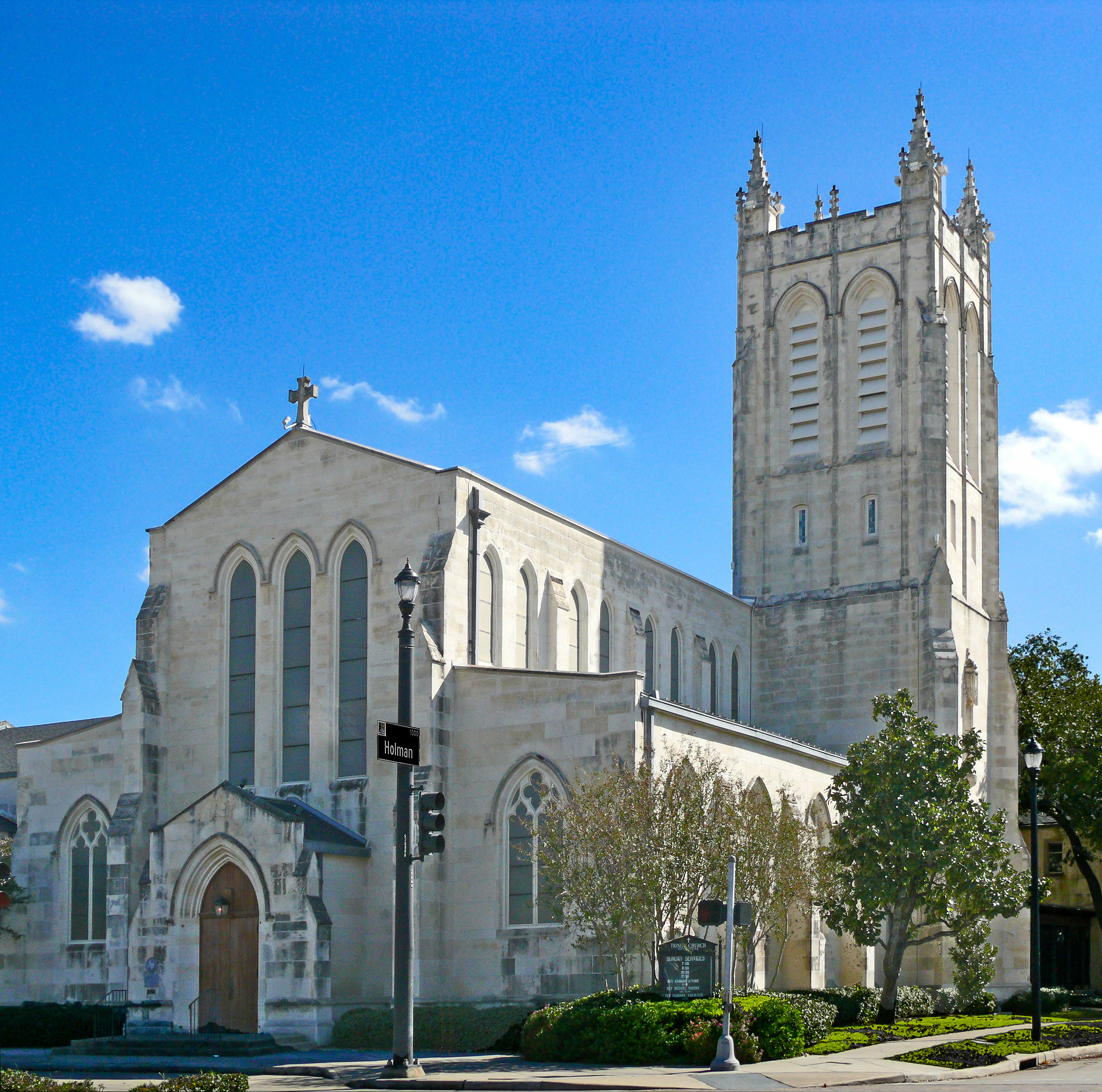
Trinity Episcopal Church

Trinity Church, in Midtown Houston, Texas, is a parish church in the Episcopal Diocese of Texas.

== History ==
Trinity was founded in 1893 as a mission from Christ Church in a part of Houston then called the "Fairground Addition", now known as Midtown. It is the second-oldest Episcopal parish in Houston. Trinity was, at one time, one of the largest parishes in the Episcopal Church. Such notables as Walter Cronkite and Denton Cooley have been members of the parish. Its membership declined sharply as its parishioners moved to the suburbs in the 1950s and 1960s. In the 2000s membership has grown steadily.

Five rectors of Trinity have gone on to be bishops in the Episcopal Church. Another has served as dean of a cathedral.

The Reverend Hannah E. Atkins became Trinity's fifteenth rector in September 2007.

In 1990, Trinity founded the Lord of the Streets Mission, a mission of the Diocese of Texas to the homeless of Houston. Although no longer under the auspices of Trinity Church, Lord of the Streets' services are held at Trinity.

== The church building ==
- Trinity Church
- U.S. National Register of Historic Places
- Recorded Texas Historic Landmark
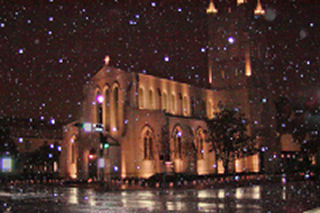
- Trinity Church during Houston's 2004 Christmas Eve Snowstorm
- Built: 1919
- Architect: Cram and Ferguson
- Architectural style: Gothic Revival
- NRHP reference No.: 83004481
- RTHL No.: 10797

Significant dates
- Added to NRHP: May 26, 1983
- Designated RTHL: 1986

The current church building, which dates from 1919, is a neo-Gothic structure, designed by the noted architectural firm, Cram and Ferguson, whose Houston work also includes several buildings at Rice University and the Julia Ideson Building of Houston Public Library. The church's Morrow Chapel was renovated in 2002 and features world-class stained glass, artwork, and liturgical furnishings by such artists as Kim Clark Renteria, Kermit Oliver, Troy Woods, Shazia Sikander, and Selven O’Keef Jarmon. The church also houses a 1918 Pilcher pipe organ, which was recently restored.

== At the church ==
At Trinity, there are ministries for all ages, varied opportunities for spiritual growth, and many programs in which to reach out to others in the community. In addition, special events often take place at Trinity, including the annual Animal Blessing, in the autumn, and Jazz Festival, in the winter. There are also occasional Sunday-evening concerts and special services such as Choral Evensong and sung Compline presented by the Trinity Choir, as well as worship in the Taizé tradition.

== See also ==
- Christianity in Houston
