= List of Episcopal bishops of the United States =

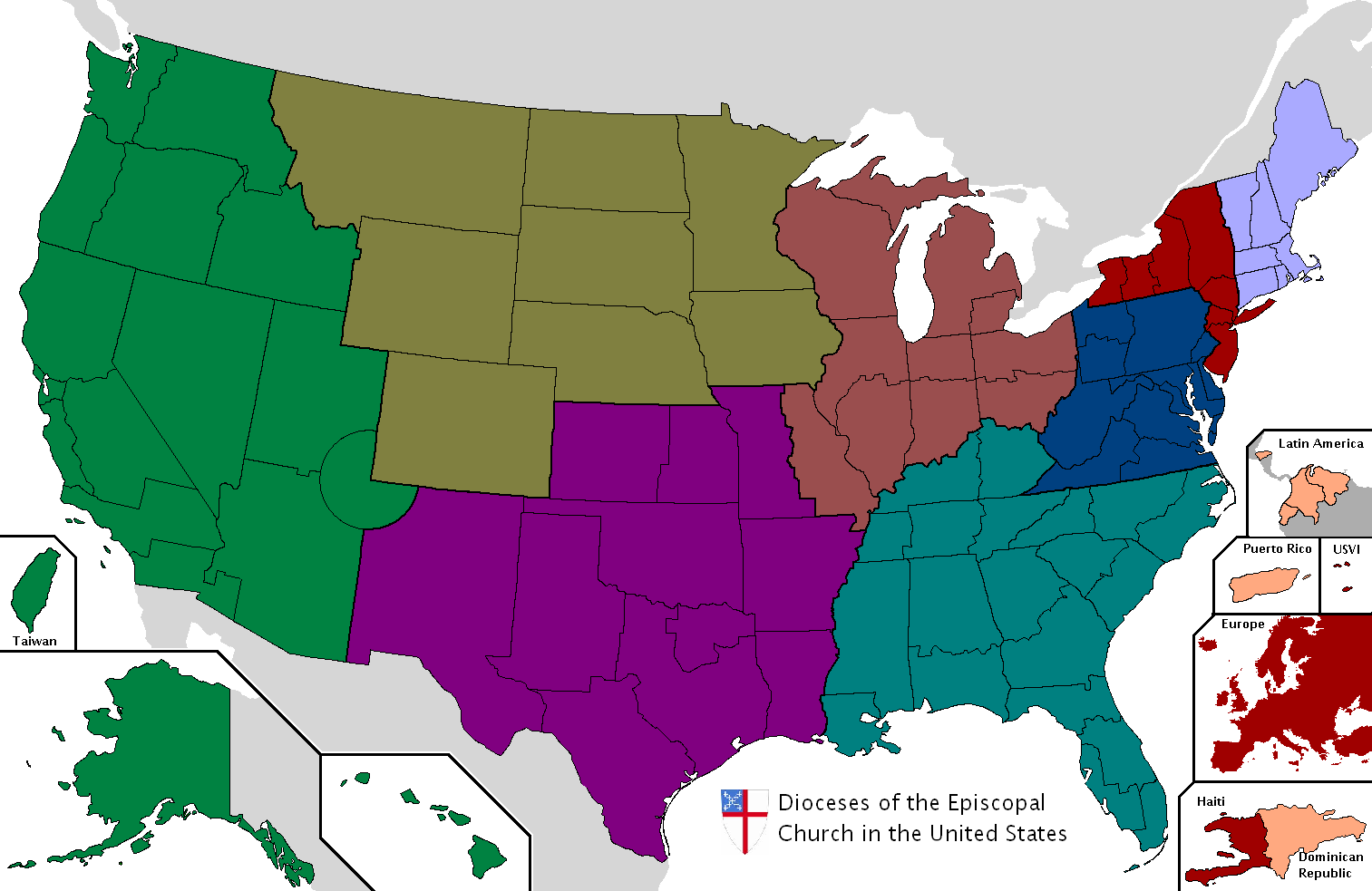
Map of dioceses of the Episcopal Church, colored by province: Province I Province II Province III / Province IV Province V Province VI / Province VII Province VIII Province IX

The following is a list of bishops who currently lead dioceses of the Episcopal Church in the United States and its territories. Also included in the list are suffragan bishops, provisional bishops, coadjutor bishops, and assistant bishops. The dioceses are grouped into nine provinces, the first eight of which, for the most part, correspond to regions of the US. Province IX is composed of dioceses in Latin America.

== Dioceses and bishops ==
Province	Diocese	Diocese map	Bishop	Title	Consecrated
Province I	Connecticut		Jeffrey Mello	Bishop of Connecticut	15 October 2022
Province I	Connecticut		Laura J. Ahrens	Suffragan Bishop of Connecticut	30 June 2007
Province I	Maine		Thomas J. Brown	Bishop of Maine	22 June 2019
Province I	Massachusetts		Julia Whitworth	Bishop of Massachusetts	19 October 2024
Province I	New Hampshire		A. Robert Hirschfeld	Bishop of New Hampshire	4 August 2012
Province I	Rhode Island		Nicholas Knisely	Bishop of Rhode Island	17 November 2012
Province I	Vermont		Shannon MacVean-Brown	Bishop of Vermont	28 September 2019
Province I	Western Massachusetts		Douglas John Fisher	former Bishop of Western Massachusetts	1 December 2012
Province I	Western Massachusetts		Miguelina Howell	Bishop of Western Massachusetts	25 April, 2026
Province II	Albany		Jeremiah Williamson	Bishop of Albany	February 24, 2024
Province II	Central New York		DeDe Duncan-Probe	Bishop of Central New York	December 3, 2016
Province II	Long Island		Adam Shoemaker	Bishop of Long Island	September 19, 2026
Province II	Long Island		Geralyn Wolf	Assisting Bishop of Long Island	
Province II	New Jersey		Sally Johnson French	Bishop of New Jersey	June 24, 2023
Province II	New York		Matthew Heyd	Bishop of New York	May 20, 2023
Province II	New York		Allen K. Shin	Suffragan Bishop of New York	May 17, 2014
Province II	Newark		Carlye J. Hughes	Bishop of Newark	September 22, 2018
Province II	Rochester		Kara Wagner Sherer	Bishop of Rochester	July 13, 2024
Province II	Virgin Islands		Edward Ambrose Gumbs	Bishop of the Virgin Islands	June 11, 2005
Province II	Western New York		Vacant		
Province III	Bethlehem		Kevin D. Nichols	Bishop of Bethlehem	
Province III	Central Pennsylvania		Audrey Scanlan	Bishop of Central Pennsylvania	
Province III	Delaware		Kevin S. Brown	Bishop of Delaware	
Province III	Easton		Santosh Marray	Bishop of Easton	
Province III	Maryland		Carrie Schofield-Broadbent	Bishop of Maryland	
Province III	Northwestern Pennsylvania		Vacant		
Province III	Pennsylvania		Daniel G. P. Gutierrez	Bishop of Pennsylvania	
Province III	Pittsburgh		Ketlen A. Solak	Bishop of Pittsburgh	
Province III	Southern Virginia		Susan B. Haynes	Bishop of Southern Virginia	
Province III	Southwestern Virginia		Karin MacPhail	Bishop of Southwestern Virginia	
Province III	Virginia		E. Mark Stevenson	Bishop of Virginia	
Province III	Virginia		Gayle Harris	Assistant Bishop of Virginia	
Province III	Virginia		Mark Bourlakas	Assistant Bishop of Virginia	
Province III	Washington		Mariann Budde	Bishop of Washington	
Province III	West Virginia		Matthew D. Cowden	Bishop of West Virginia	
Province IV	Alabama		Richard T. Lawson	Bishop of Alabama	
Province IV	Atlanta		Rob Wright	Bishop of Atlanta	
Province IV	Central Florida		Justin S. Holcomb	Bishop of Central Florida	
Province IV	Central Gulf Coast		Russell Kendrick	Bishop of Central Gulf Coast	
Province IV	East Carolina		Sarah Fisher	Bishop of East Carolina	
Province IV	East Tennessee		Brian Lee Cole	Bishop of East Tennessee	
Province IV	Florida		Scott Benhase	Assisting Bishop of Florida	
Province IV	Florida		Chip Stokes	Assistant Bishop of Florida	
Province IV	Georgia		Frank S. Logue	Bishop of Georgia	
Province IV	Kentucky		Terry A. White	Bishop of Kentucky	
Province IV	Lexington		Mark Van Koevering	Bishop of Lexington	
Province IV	Louisiana		Shannon Duckworth	Bishop of Louisiana	
Province IV	Mississippi		Dorothy Sanders Wells	Bishop of Mississippi	
Province IV	North Carolina		Samuel Rodman	Bishop of North Carolina	
Province IV	North Carolina		Jennifer Brooke-Davidson	Assistant Bishop of North Carolina	
Province IV	South Carolina		Ruth Woodliff-Stanley	Bishop of South Carolina	
Province IV	Southeast Florida		Peter Eaton	Bishop of Southeast Florida	
Province IV	Southwest Florida		Douglas Scharf	Bishop of Southwest Florida	
Province IV	Tennessee		John C. Bauerschmidt	Bishop of Tennessee	
Province IV	Upper South Carolina		Daniel P. Richards	Bishop of Upper South Carolina	
Province IV	West Tennessee		Phoebe Alison Roaf	Bishop of West Tennessee	
Province IV	Western North Carolina		José Antonio McLoughlin	Bishop of Western Carolina	
Province V	Chicago		Paula E. Clark	Bishop of Chicago	
Province V	Eastern Michigan		Skip Adams	Provisional Bishop of Eastern Michigan	
Province V	Eau Claire		Matthew A. Gunter	Provisional Bishop of Eau Claire	
Province V	Fond du Lac		Matthew A. Gunter	Bishop of Fond du Lac	
Province V	Indianapolis		Jennifer Baskerville-Burrows	Bishop of Indianapolis	
Province V	Michigan		Bonnie Perry	Bishop of Michigan	
Province V	Milwaukee		Jeffrey D. Lee	Bishop Provisional of Milwaukee	
Province V	Missouri		Deon K. Johnson	Bishop of Missouri	
Province V	Northern Indiana		Douglas Sparks	Bishop of Northern Indiana	
Province V	Northern Michigan		Rayford Ray	Bishop of Northern Michigan	
Province V	Ohio		Anne Jolly	Bishop of Ohio	
Province V	Southern Ohio		Kristin Uffelman White	Bishop of Southern Ohio	
Province V	Springfield		Brian K. Burgess	Bishop of Springfield	
Province V	Western Michigan		Skip Adams	Provisional Bishop of Western Michigan	
Province VI	Colorado		Kimberly Lucas	Bishop of Colorado	
Province VI	Iowa		Betsey Monnot	Bishop of Iowa	
Province VI	Minnesota		Craig Loya	Bishop of Minnesota	
Province VI	Montana		Martha (Marty) Stebbins	Bishop of Montana	
Province VI	Nebraska		Joseph Scott Barker	Bishop of Nebraska	
Province VI	North Dakota		Shay Craig	Bishop of North Dakota	
Province VI	South Dakota		Jonathan Folts	Bishop of South Dakota	
Province VI	Wyoming		Vacant	Bishop of Wyoming	
Province VII	Arkansas		John T. W. Harmon	Bishop of Arkansas	
Province VII	Dallas		George R. Sumner	Bishop of Dallas	
Province VII	Dallas		Fraser Lawton	Assistant Bishop of Dallas	
Province VII	Kansas		Cathleen Chittenden Bascom	Bishop of Kansas	
Province VII	Northwest Texas		Scott Mayer	Bishop of Northwest Texas	
Province VII	Oklahoma		Poulson Reed	Bishop of Oklahoma	
Province VII	Rio Grande		Michael Buerkel Hunn	Bishop of the Rio Grande	
Province VII	Texas		C. Andrew Doyle	Bishop of Texas	
Province VII	Texas		Jeff W. Fisher	Suffragan Bishop of Texas	
Province VII	Texas		Kathryn McCrossen Ryan	Suffragan Bishop of Texas	
Province VII	Texas		Hector Monterroso	Assistant Bishop of Texas	
Province VII	West Missouri		Amy Dafler Meaux	Bishop of West Missouri	
Province VII	West Texas		David Reed	Bishop of West Texas	
Province VII	West Texas		David G. Read	Bishop Coadjutor of West Texas	
Province VII	Western Kansas		Mark A. Cowell	Bishop of Western Kansas	
Province VII	Western Kansas		Michael Milliken	Assisting Bishop of Western Kansas	
Province VII	Western Kansas		Silvestre Romero	Assistant Bishop of Western Kansas	
Province VII	Western Louisiana		Jacob W. Owensby	Bishop of Western Louisiana	
Province VIII	Alaska		Mark Lattime	Bishop of Alaska	
Province VIII	Arizona		Jennifer A. Reddall	Bishop of Arizona	
Province VIII	California		Marc Andrus	Bishop of California	
Province VIII	California		Austin Rios	Bishop Coadjutor of California	
Province VIII	Eastern Oregon		Patrick W. Bell	Bishop of Eastern Oregon	
Province VIII	El Camino Real		Lucinda Ashby	Bishop of El Camino Real	
Province VIII	Hawaii		Robert Fitzpatrick	Bishop of Hawaii	
Province VIII	Idaho		Jos Tharakan	Bishop of Idaho	
Province VIII	Los Angeles		Antonio Gallardo Lucena	Bishop of Los Angeles	
Province VIII	Navajoland Area Mission (Note: While the Navajoland Area Mission is not a diocese, it serves a similar function.)		David Earle Bailey	Bishop of Navajoland	
Province VIII	Nevada		Elizabeth B. Gardner	Bishop of Nevada	
Province VIII	Northern California		Megan Traquair	Bishop of Northern California	
Province VIII	Olympia		Philip N. LaBelle	Bishop of Olympia	
Province VIII	Oregon		Diana Akiyama	Bishop of Oregon	
Province VIII	San Diego		Susan Brown Snook	Bishop of San Diego	
Province VIII	San Joaquin		David Rice	Bishop of San Joaquin	
Province VIII	San Joaquin		Gregory Kimura	Bishop-elect of San Joaquin	
Province VIII	Spokane		Gretchen Rehberg	Bishop of Spokane	
Province VIII	Utah		Phyllis A. Spiegel	Bishop of Utah	
Province IX	Puerto Rico		Rafael Morales	Bishop of Puerto Rico	
N/A	Armed Services and Federal Ministries		Ann Ritonia	Bishop of the Armed Services	

== See also ==
- Historical list of bishops of the Episcopal Church in the United States
- List of the Episcopal cathedrals of the United States
