= Episcopal Diocese of Texas =

Diocese of the Episcopal Church in the United States

Diocese of Texas Diœcesis Texensis

Location
- Country: United States
- Territory: Central and southeastern Texas
- Ecclesiastical province: VII
- Headquarters: 1225 Texas Ave, Houston, TX 77002

Statistics
- Area: 49,489 sq mi (128,180 km^{2})
- Congregations: 163 (2024)
- Members: 72,259 (2023)

Information
- Denomination: Episcopal Church
- Established: January 1, 1849
- Cathedral: Christ Church Cathedral, Houston

Current leadership
- Bishop: C. Andrew Doyle
- Suffragans: Jeff W. Fisher; Kathryn McCrossen Ryan
- Auxiliary Bishops: Hector Monterroso; Brian R. Seage

Map
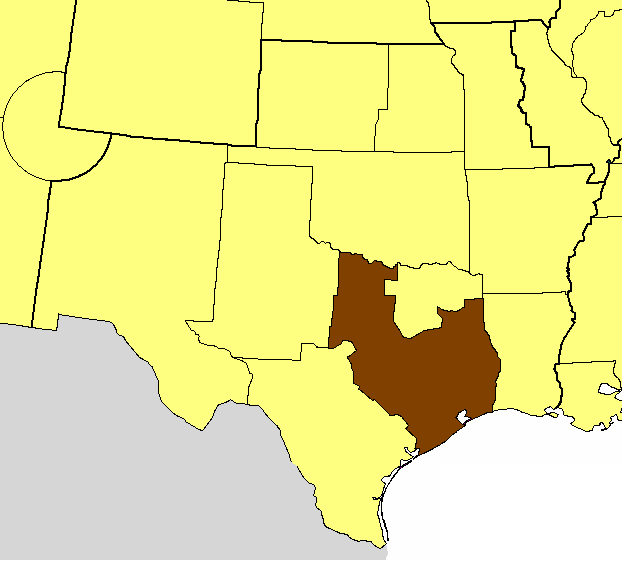
- Diocese of Texas after 2022 expansion

Website
- epicenter.org

The Episcopal Diocese of Texas is one of the dioceses of the Episcopal Church in the United States of America. The diocese consists of all Episcopal congregations in the southeastern quartile of Texas, including the cities of Austin, Beaumont, Galveston, Houston (the see city), Waco and, as of July 2022, Fort Worth and other cities within the former diocese in North Texas. In 2024, the diocese reported average Sunday attendance (ASA) of 18,114 persons. The most recent membership statistics (2023) showed 72,259 persons in 163 churches. Reported plate and pledge income for 2024 was $89,509,484.

The 174 congregations in the Diocese of Texas have ministries, locally and abroad. They include: homeless and feeding ministries, clinics, after school programs for at risk youth, ministry to seniors, ESL and citizenship classes and much more. 24 new churches have been planted in the diocese since 2012.

Institutions of the diocese include St. Vincent's House, a social service agency, in Galveston; St. David's Hospital, a healthcare system, in Austin; El Buen Samaritano, an agency to help working poor in Austin; COTS/LOTS, Community of the Streets, outreach to homeless men and women in midtown Houston; Episcopal High School, Houston; St. Andrew's Episcopal School, Austin; and the Seminary of the Southwest in Austin.

The diocese traces its foundation to Christ Church in Matagorda in 1838, when it became the first foreign missionary field of the Episcopal Church (as part of the Republic of Texas). Together with Christ Church, Houston (1839) and Trinity Church, Galveston (1841) it formed the Episcopal Church of Texas, the Episcopal presence in the Republic of Texas. It formally became a diocese of the Episcopal Church in 1849. The diocese expanded to include the territory of the Episcopal Church in North Texas in 2022.

Christ Church became the cathedral of the diocese in 1949. The current bishop is C. Andrew Doyle (born 1966). He succeeded Don Wimberly as diocesan on June 7, 2009, upon Wimberly's retirement.

== Previous bishops ==
Missionary Bishops of Texas include Leonidas Polk and George Washington Freeman (until Texas was admitted to the Union in 1845). The diocese organized in 1849 and elected Alexander Gregg its first bishop in 1859. He served until 1893 when his coadjutor (elected to succeed), George Herbert Kinsolving, became Bishop of Texas. Kinsolving's coadjutor, Clinton Simon Quin, succeeded him 35 years later in 1928.

John Hines served as bishop coadjutor under Quin for ten years and became diocesan in 1955. Nine years later, in 1964, Hines was elected Presiding Bishop of the Episcopal Church where he served for a decade. James Milton Richardson was consecrated the fifth Bishop of Texas on February 10, 1965, and served as diocesan until his death in 1980. The sixth Bishop of Texas, Maurice M. Benitez, was elected in 1980. In June 1993 Claude E. Payne was elected the fourth bishop coadjutor of the Diocese of Texas and became the seventh Bishop of Texas February 10, 1995. Don Wimberly became the eighth bishop of Texas in June, 2003, retiring at the mandatory age of 72 on June 6, 2009. Doyle, elected in May, 2008, was consecrated at St. Martins, Houston, on November 22, 2008, and invested and seated on June 7, 2009.

Additionally, Texas has had nine bishops suffragan and eight assistant bishops since becoming a diocese: F. Percy Goddard, James P. Clements, and Roger Howard Cilley; Scott Field Bailey; Gordon T. Charlton; William E. Sterling Sr., Leopoldo J. Alard, and Rayford B. High Jr. served as bishops suffragan. Dena Harrison served as bishop suffragan for the central region of the diocese; she was the thirteenth woman consecrated to the episcopate in the Episcopal Church and the first in a diocese in the South. She was succeeded by Kathryn "Kai" Ryan in 2019. Jeff W. Fisher was elected bishop suffragan for the east Texas region of the diocese on June 2, 2012, following the retirement of Rayford High in 2011. Anselmo Carral, William J. Cox, Don Wimberly, James B. Brown, Ted Daniels, John Buchanan, Hector Monterroso, and Brian R. Seage have served as assistant bishops.

Bishops of Texas

No.	Name	Years
I	Alexander Gregg	1859–1893
II	George Herbert Kinsolving	1893–1928
III	Clinton S. Quin	1928–1955
IV	John Elbridge Hines	1955–1964
V	J. Milton Richardson	1965–1980
VI	Maurice M. Benitez	1980–1995
VII	Claude E. Payne	1995–2003
VIII	Don A. Wimberly	2003–2009
IX	C. Andrew Doyle	2009–present

Suffragan Bishops of Texas

No.	Name	Years
I	Frederick Percy Goddard	1955–1972
II	James Parker Clements	1956–1960
III	Scott Bailey	1964–1975
IV	Roger Howard Cilley	1976–1985
V	Gordon T. Charlton Jr.	1982–1989
VI	William E. Sterling	1989–1999
VII	Leopoldo J. Alard	1995–2003
VIII	Rayford B. High Jr.	2003–2012
IX	Dena Harrison	2006–2019
X	Jeff W. Fisher	2012–present
XI	Kathryn McCrossen Ryan	2019–present

== Schools ==
- Ascension Episcopal School, Houston (PN-8)
- All Saints Episcopal School, Beaumont (PN-8)
- All Saints Episcopal School, Tyler (PK-12)
- Calvary Episcopal School, Richmond (PK-12)
- Episcopal High School, Bellaire
- Grace Episcopal School, Georgetown
- Holy Spirit Episcopal School, Houston (PK-8)
- Holy Trinity Episcopal School, Harris County (PK-8)
- St. Francis Episcopal School, Piney Point Village (PN-12)
- St. James the Apostle Episcopal School, Conroe (I-PK)
- St. Stephen's Episcopal School, Austin
- St. Stephen's Episcopal School, Houston (PN-8)
- St. Thomas' Episcopal School, Houston (K-12)
- St. Thomas the Apostle Episcopal School, Nassau Bay (PK-5)
- St. Mark's Episcopal School (West University Place, Texas), Houston (PN-8)
- St. Andrew's Episcopal School, Austin (K-12)
- Trinity Episcopal Day School, The Woodlands (2-PK)
- Trinity School of Texas, Longview (PK-12)
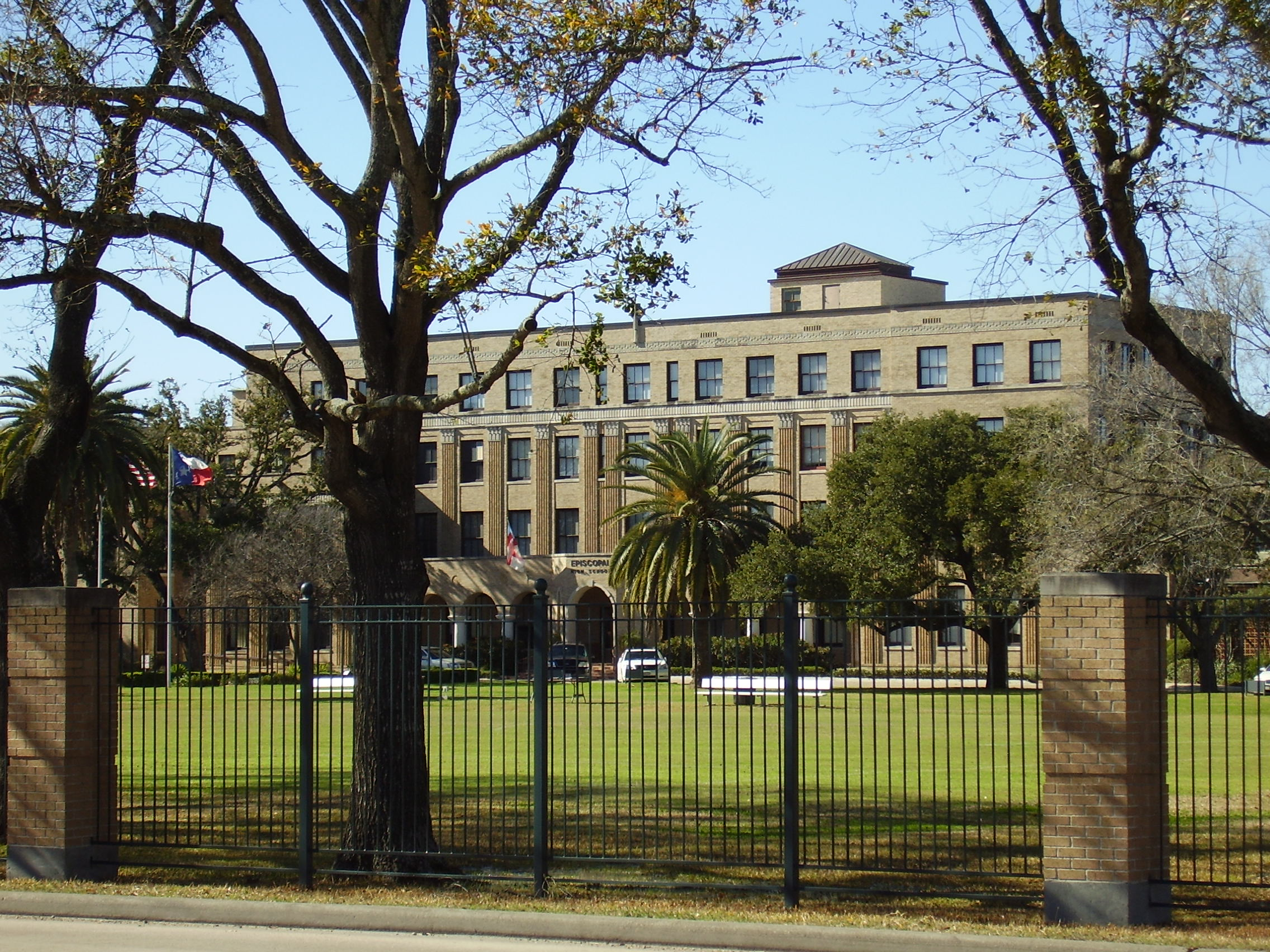
Episcopal High School, Bellaire

Brewster Memorial, St. Stephen's Episcopal School, Austin

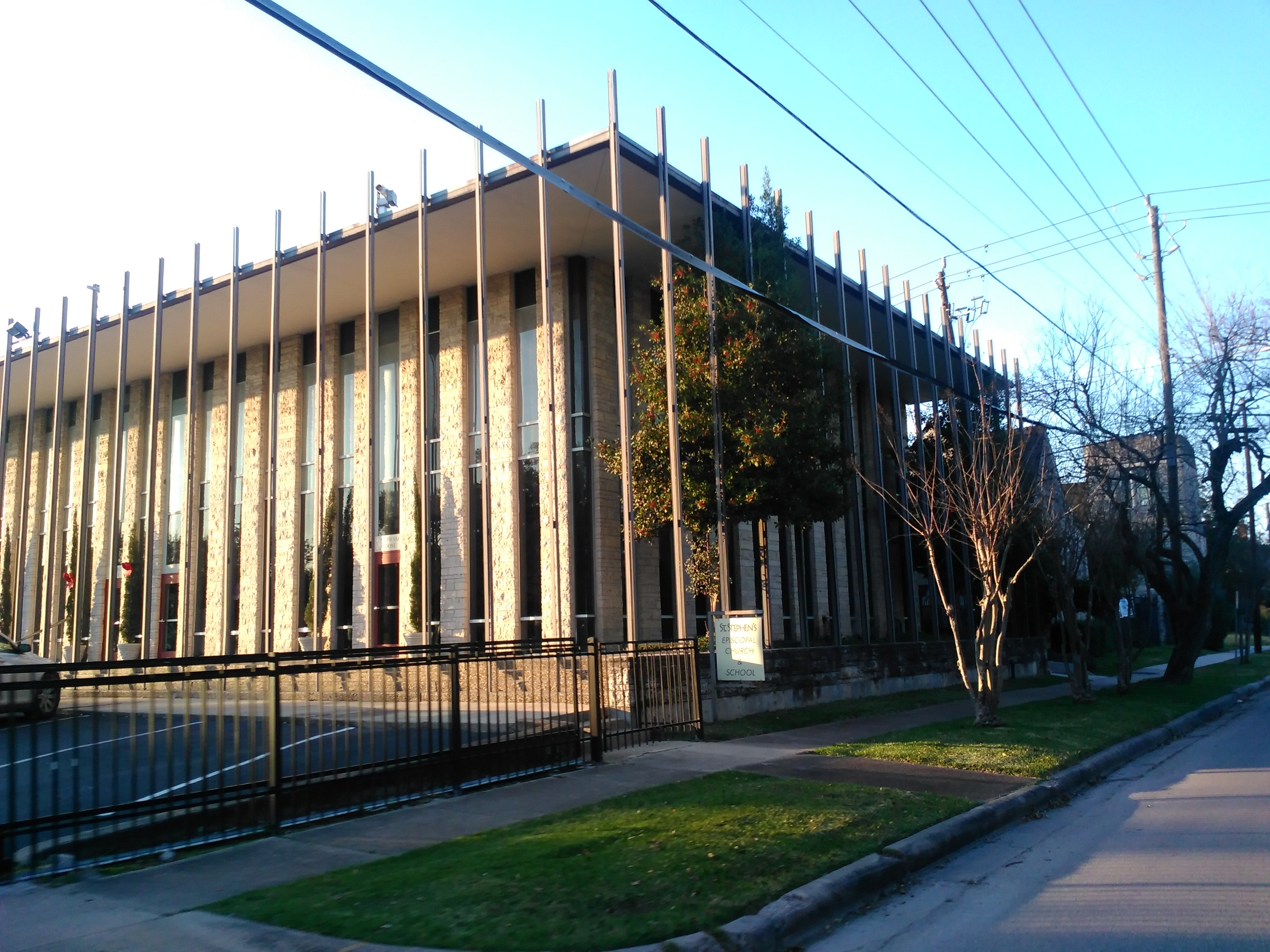
St. Stephen's School, Houston

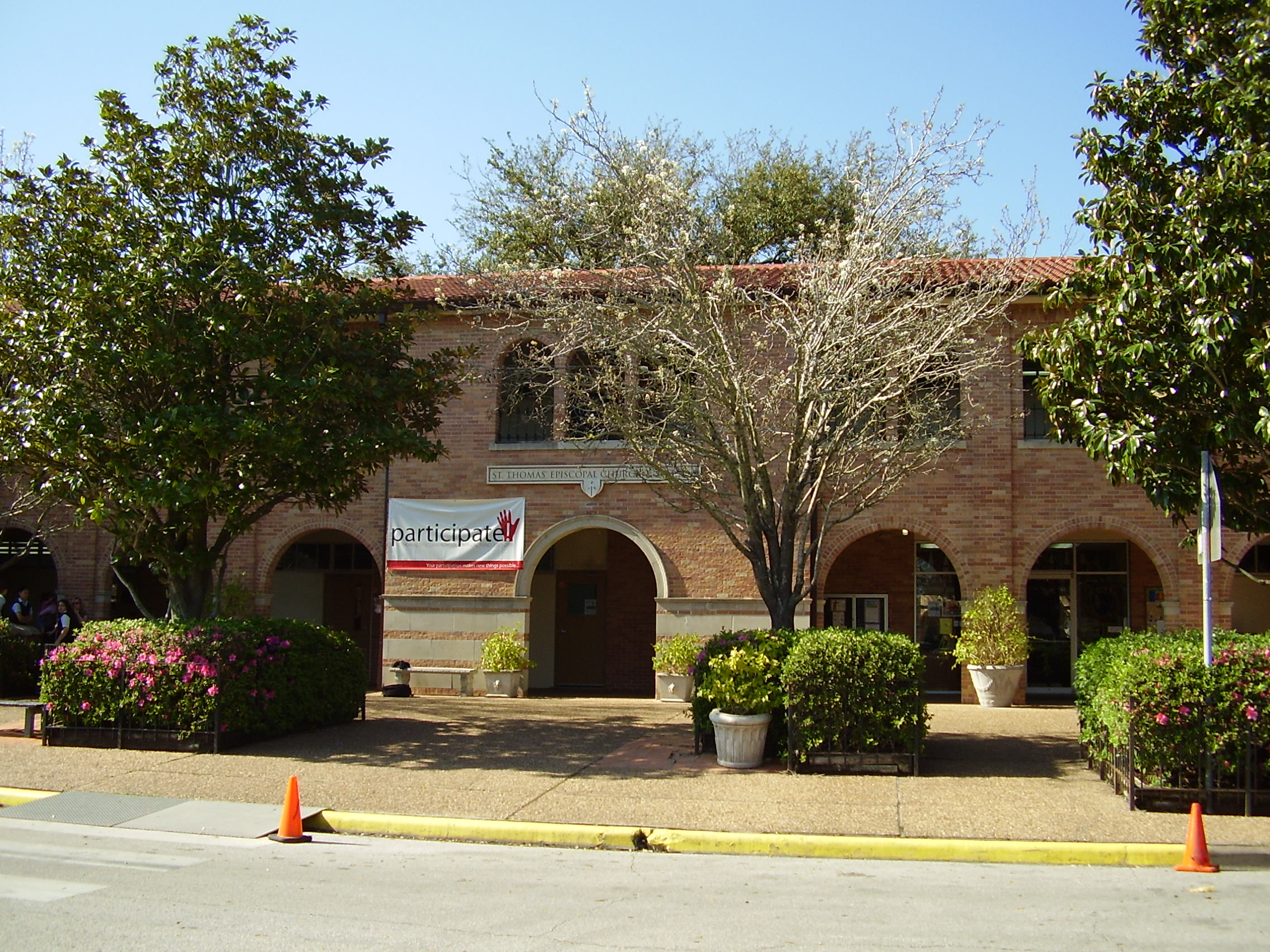
St. Thomas School, Houston

== Other Diocesan Organizations ==
- Camp Allen Conference and Retreat Center, Navasota, TX
- Episcopal Health Foundation, Houston, TX

== See also ==
- Christianity in Houston
