= Camp Allen (Navasota, TX) =

Episcopal Summer Camp

Coordinates: 30.2412°N 95.9598°W

Camp Allen is an Episcopal summer camp and conference center in Navasota, TX. It a ministry of the Episcopal Diocese of Texas. The camp spans 1,100 acres. Activities include swimming, archery, canoeing, and horseback riding.

== History ==
Camp Allen was founded in 1921 by the Rt. Rev. Clinton S. Quin, the Bishop Coadjutor of the Episcopal Diocese of Texas, and Rosa Lum Allen, originally in Galveston. Camp Allen began hosting summer camps in the current location in 1974. On October 21, 2024, Camp Allen broke ground on a new hotel building named after Bishop Quin. The current president of Camp Allen is Allen Kight.

== Camp Good News ==
For one week each summer, Camp Allen hosts Camp Good News for children of incarcerated parents at no-cost to parent/family/caregiver.
