= Christ Church Cathedral (Houston) =

Historic church in Houston, Texas, U.S.

- Christ Church Cathedral, Houston
- U.S. National Register of Historic Places
- Recorded Texas Historic Landmark
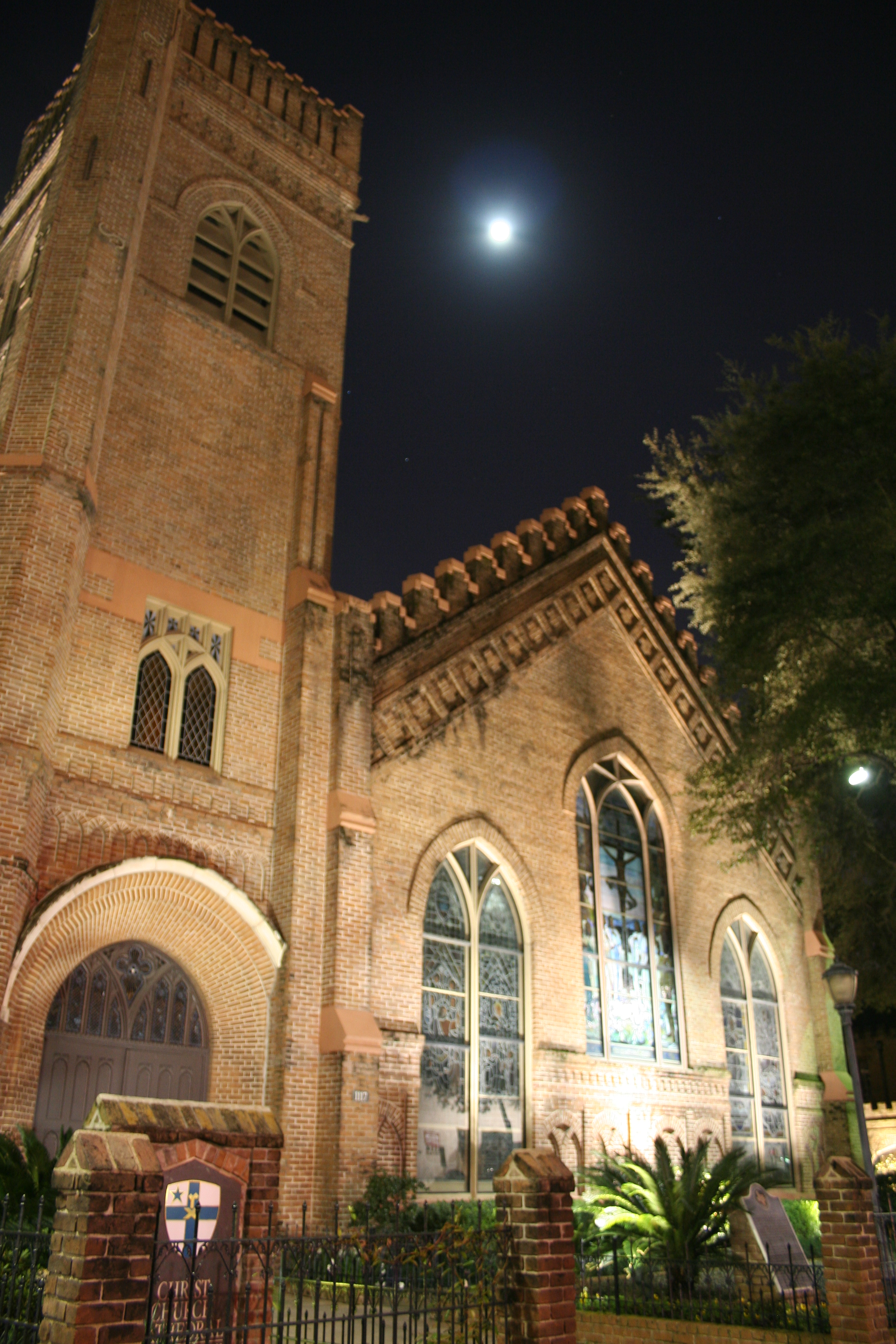
- Christ Church Cathedral at night

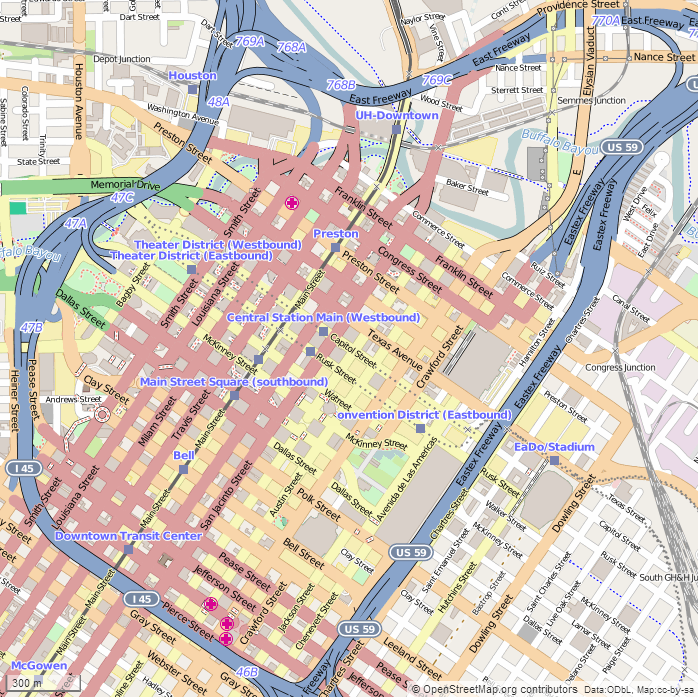
- Location within Houston Downtown Location within Texas Location within the United States
- Location: 1117 Texas Ave; Houston, Texas
- Coordinates: 29.7596°N 95.3612°W
- Built: 1893
- Architect: Silas McBee
- Architectural style: Late Gothic Revival
- NRHP reference No.: 79002957
- RTHL No.: 10631

Significant dates
- Added to NRHP: June 15, 1979
- Designated RTHL: 1972

Christ Church Cathedral, Houston is the cathedral church for the Episcopal Diocese of Texas. The congregation was established in 1839, when Texas was still an independent republic. It is the oldest extant congregation in Houston and one of the oldest non-Roman Catholic churches in Texas. Many Episcopal churches in Houston and the surrounding area were founded as missions of Christ Church, such as Trinity Church, Houston, founded in 1893.

In 2021, the cathedral reported 4,039 members. In 2025, the cathedral reported 2,409 members. Average Sunday Attendance (ASA) reported by the cathedral in 2025 was 444 persons. This was a relative decrease from ASA of 768 persons reported in 2017.

== History ==
The first known Episcopal clergy to preach in Houston was the Reverend Richard Salmon, who arrived in Texas in 1836 and first visited Houston in 1838. At that time, the Texas government permitted church meetings in the Capitol Building since there were no churches yet established in Houston.

Christ Church was founded on March 16, 1839, making it the first chartered congregation in Houston. The principal founder of Christ Church was William Fairfax Gray. A native of Fredericksburg, Virginia, Gray was a vestryman of St. George's Church in that city. After passing the bar in Virginia in 1835, he traveled to Texas, where he worked as a land agent and helped to organize the interim Texas Revolutionary government. By 1837, he arrived in Houston with plans to establish a law office and moved his family there from Virginia.

The first permanent church building for Christ Church was erected in 1847, overseen by the rector, Charles Gillette. Located at the northeast corner of Texas Avenue and Fannin Street, Christ Church lay at the edge of town. The small Gothic church was clad in red brick and capped by a steeple. A gallery overlooked the nave with a wide central bank of pews, flanked by two smaller banks of pews. The Christ Church congregation increased in number so fast that the building was at capacity within a decade.

In 1857, the Reverend W. T. D. Dalzell was appointed as the new rector and the vestry solicited subscriptions for the construction of a rectory. Bering Brothers constructed a main hall with two stories and two small wings fronting Texas Avenue, with a double gallery attached to the facade.

Located at 1117 Texas Avenue in Downtown Houston, the current building dates from 1893. In 1938 the building suffered a major fire. A firefighter sprayed down the ornately carved rood screen to prevent its destruction, and it survived with only minor damage. Everett Titcomb composed the anthem "Behold Now, Praise the Lord" for the rededication and centennial of Christ Church.

Christ Church became the cathedral of the diocese in 1949. Presently, Christ Church has a baptized membership of more than 3000 communicants.

== Clergy ==
Christ Church's first rector was the Rev’d Charles Gillett of Connecticut. He led the congregation to build its first church building in 1845. James P. deWolfe was the church's rector from 1934 to 1940. He rebuilt the edifice and started many programs before going on to be the Bishop of the Episcopal Diocese of Long Island. From 2013-2022, the dean was the Very Reverend Barkley S. Thompson. The current dean is the Very Reverend Nathaniel Katz.

=== List of missionaries ===
- The Reverend Robert Martin Chapman, missionary (1838−1839)
- The Reverend Henry B. Goodwin, rector pro tempore (1839−1840)
- The Reverend Benjamin Eaton, missionary (1841)

=== List of rectors ===
- The Reverend Charles Gillett (1843−1852)
- The Reverend Henry Sampson (1852)
- The Reverend J.J. Nicholson (1854−1855)
- The Reverend W.T.D. Dalzell (1857−1861)
- The Reverend Edwin A. Wagner(1862−1864)

== Cathedral House Episcopal School ==
The school opened in 1986 on the campus of Christ Church Cathedral with a philosophy grounded in the teachings of Maria Montessori. Classrooms include nursery, movement, toddler, primary and kindergarten.

== See also ==
- List of the Episcopal cathedrals of the United States
- List of cathedrals in the United States

== Bibliography ==
- Bradley, Barrie Scardino (2020). Improbable Metropolis: Houston's Architectural and Urban History. Austin: University of Texas Press. ISBN 978-1477320198.
- Johnston, Marguerite (1964). A Happy Worldly Abode: Christ Church Cathedral, 1839/1964. Houston: Cathedral Press.
- David A. Kalvelage, Cathedrals of the Episcopal Church in the U.S.A. (Forward Movement Publications, 1993) ISBN 9780880281430
