= Theodore H. McCrea =

Suffragan bishop

The Right Reverend Theodore Harper McCrea S.T.D.
- Suffragan Bishop of Dallas
- Church: Episcopal Church
- Diocese: Dallas
- Elected: September 14, 1962
- In office: 1962–1975
- Predecessor: Joseph Harte
- Successor: Robert E. Terwilliger

Orders
- Ordination: December 1943 by James De Wolf Perry
- Consecration: December 4, 1962 by Arthur C. Lichtenberger

Personal details
- Born: March 27, 1908 Minneapolis, Minnesota, United States
- Died: September 22, 1986 (aged 78) Dallas, Texas, United States
- Buried: Bishop Mason Mausoleum and Columbarium, Flower Mound, Texas
- Denomination: Anglican
- Parents: Christopher Harper McCrea & Elizabeth Amelia Pratt
- Education: University of Minnesota; Harvard University; General Theological Seminary

Theodore Harper McCrea (March 27, 1908 – September 22, 1986) was a suffragan bishop of the Episcopal Diocese of Dallas, serving from 1962 to 1975.

== Early life and education ==
McCrea was born on March 27, 1908, in Minneapolis, to the Reverend Christopher Harper McCrea (1873-1953) and Elizabeth Amelia Pratt. He was educated at the high school in New Trier, Minnesota, and then at the University of Minnesota from which he graduated with a Bachelor of Arts in 1929. He also earned a Masters of Arts in 1930 from Harvard University and a Bachelor of Sacred Theology in 1943 from the General Theological Seminary. In 1964 he was awarded an honorary Doctor of Sacred Theology degree.

== Ordained ministry ==
McCrea was ordained a deacon in the Episcopal Church on June 7, 1943, at the Church of the Advent in Boston by the Bishop of Massachusetts Henry Knox Sherrill, and priest in December of the same year by Bishop James De Wolf Perry of Rhode Island. He served as assistant minister at St Martin's Church in Providence, Rhode Island, between 1943 and 1946 and then priest-in-charge of St John's Mission in Dallas. In 1948, St John's became a parish church and hence McCrea became its first rector. Simultaneously he was also principal and chaplain of the adjoining school.

== Episcopacy ==
McCrea was elected Suffragan Bishop of Dallas on September 14, 1962, on the seventh ballot during a special convention which took place at the Church of St Michael and All Angels in Dallas. He was consecrated on December 4, 1962, in St Matthew's Cathedral with Presiding Bishop Arthur C. Lichtenberger as chief consecrator. He remained in office until his retirement in 1975. He died on September 22, 1986, in Dallas due to heart problems.
