= Charles F. Duvall =

The Right Reverend Charles Farmer Duvall D.D.
- Bishop of the Central Gulf Coast
- Church: Episcopal Church
- Diocese: Central Gulf Coast
- Elected: November 15, 1980
- In office: 1981–2001
- Predecessor: George M. Murray
- Successor: Philip M. Duncan II

Orders
- Ordination: 1961
- Consecration: April 11, 1981 by John Allin

Personal details
- Born: November 18, 1935 Cheraw, South Carolina, U.S.
- Died: October 8, 2020 (aged 84) Columbia, South Carolina, U.S.
- Buried: Old Saint Davids Episcopal Church Cemetery, Cheraw, South Carolina, United States
- Denomination: Anglican
- Parents: Henry Duvall & Elizabeth Phoebe Farmer
- Spouse: Nancy Warren Rice
- Children: 3
- Education: The Citadel

Charles Farmer Duvall (November 18, 1935 – October 8, 2020) was an American bishop of the Episcopal Diocese of the Central Gulf Coast from 1981 to 2001. He was consecrated on April 11, 1981.

== Early life and education ==
Duvall was born in Cheraw, South Carolina, on November 18, 1935, the son of Henry Duvall and Elizabeth Phoebe Farmer. He graduated with a Bachelor of Arts in History from The Citadel, The Military College of South Carolina in 1957. He married Nancy Warren Rice on June 2, 1957, and together they had three children. He then studied at the Virginia Theological Seminary and graduated with a Master of Divinity in 1960. He was awarded an honorary Doctor of Divinity from Virginia Theological Seminary in 1982 and from Sewanee: The University of the South in 1986.

== Ordained ministry ==
Duvall was ordained deacon in 1960 and priest in 1961. From 1960 to 1962, he served three small missions in South Carolina, notably Holy Trinity in Grahamville, South Carolina, and the Church of the Cross in Bluffton, South Carolina. In 1962 he became rector of St. James' Church in James Island, South Carolina. Between 1970 and 1977, he served as rector of Holy Trinity Church in Fayetteville, North Carolina, after which he became rector of the Church of the Advent in Spartanburg, South Carolina.

== Bishop ==
On November 15, 1980, in St Paul's Church, Mobile, Alabama, Duvall was elected as the second Bishop of the Gulf Coast. He was consecrated on April 11, 1981, with Presiding Bishop John Allin as chief consecrator in the Field House of the University of West Florida in Pensacola, Florida. During the latter part of his episcopacy, several churches (and numerous other individuals) in the diocese voted to leave the Episcopal Church which created disruption in the diocese. He retired in 2001.

== Death ==
Duvall died in Columbia, South Carolina, on October 8, 2020, at the age of 84.

== Sources ==
- Episcopal Clerical Directory 2015
- Remembering Bishop Duvall: Recollections of friends and neighbors, Written and compiled by the Rev. S. Albert Kennington, Registrar-Historiographer and Secretary Emeritus
