= Diocese of Dallas =

The Diocese of Dallas may refer to:

- Episcopal Diocese of Dallas
- Roman Catholic Diocese of Dallas
