= C. Avery Mason =

Bishop of the Episcopal Diocese of Dallas

The Right Reverend C. Avery Mason
- Bishop of Dallas
- Church: Episcopal Church
- Diocese: Dallas
- Elected: 1945
- In office: 1946–1970
- Predecessor: Harry Tunis Moore
- Successor: Donald Davies
- Previous post: Coadjutor Bishop of Dallas (1945-1946)

Orders
- Ordination: May 26, 1929
- Consecration: September 21, 1945 by Henry St. George Tucker

Personal details
- Born: August 2, 1904 St. Louis, Missouri, United States
- Died: March 6, 1970 (aged 65)
- Denomination: Anglican
- Parents: Charles Henry Mason, Mary C. Avery

Charles Avery Mason (August 2, 1904 - March 6, 1970) was bishop of the Episcopal Diocese of Dallas, serving from 1946 to 1970.

== Early life ==
Mason was born in St. Louis, Missouri, on August 2, 1904, the son of Charles Henry Mason and Mary C. Avery. He was educated at the Yeatman High School in St. Louis. He graduated with a Bachelor of Arts in 1926 from the Washington and Lee University, and a Bachelor of Divinity from the Virginia Theological Seminary in 1929. He was awarded a Doctor of Sacred Theology from Temple University in 1940.

== Ordination ==
Mason was ordained deacon on June 17, 1928, by Bishop Frederick Foote Johnson of Missouri, and priest on May 26, 1929. He served as assistant at St Stephen's Church in Washington, D.C., and then in 1929 became curate at St Agnes' Chapel of Trinity Church in New York City. In 1930 he became rector of Ascension Church in West New Brighton, Staten Island, New York City. In 1942 he was appointed office secretary of the Forward in Service program and later became its director, a post he retained until his election to the episcopacy.

== Bishop ==
Mason was elected Coadjutor Bishop of Dallas and was consecrated on September 21, 1945, in St Matthew's Cathedral with Presiding Bishop Henry St. George Tucker as chief consecrator. He succeeded as diocesan bishop on October 4, 1946, and remained in office until his death on March 6, 1970.
