= Philip M. Duncan II =

The Right Reverend Philip Menzie Duncan D.D., D.Min.
- Bishop of the Central Gulf Coast
- Church: Episcopal Church
- Diocese: Central Gulf Coast
- Elected: 2001
- In office: 2001–2015
- Predecessor: Charles F. Duvall
- Successor: James Russell Kendrick

Orders
- Ordination: 1970
- Consecration: May 12, 2001 by Frank Griswold

Personal details
- Born: December 6, 1944 (age 81) Glen Cove, New York, United States
- Denomination: Anglican
- Parents: Philip & Jesse Duncan
- Spouse: Kathlyn Anne Cowie
- Children: 2
- Education: Baldwin Wallace University

Philip Menzie Duncan II (born December 6, 1944) is an American prelate who served as the third Episcopal Bishop of the Central Gulf Coast from 2001 until 2015.

== Biography ==
Duncan was born on December 6, 1944, in Glen Cove, New York, the son of Scottish parents Philip Duncan (1915-1998) and Jessie Duncan (1917-2007). He studied at Baldwin Wallace University, from where he graduated with a Bachelor of Arts, and the General Theological Seminary from where he earned his Master of Divinity. He also received a Doctor of Ministry from Virginia Theological Seminary and a Doctor of Divinity from General Theological, the University of the South and the Virginia Seminary, respectively. In 1970 he married Kathlyn Anne Cowie and together they had two sons.

Duncan was ordained in 1970 and became associate rector of Christ Church in Ridgewood, New Jersey. In 1972 he became rector of St John's Church in Clearwater, Florida, while in 1992 he moved to Dallas, Texas, to become Dean of St Matthew's Cathedral. He was elected Bishop of the Central Gulf Coast in 2001 and was consecrated on May 12, 2001 with Presiding Bishop Frank Griswold as chief consecrator. He retained the post till his retirement in 2015.
