= Donis Patterson =

American bishop (1930–2006)

The Right Reverend Donis Patterson
- Bishop of Dallas
- Church: Episcopal Church
- Diocese: Dallas
- Elected: June 1983
- In office: 1983–1992
- Predecessor: Donald Davies
- Successor: James M. Stanton

Orders
- Ordination: 1957
- Consecration: October 29, 1983 by John Allin

Personal details
- Born: April 27, 1930 Holmesville, Ohio, United States
- Died: February 3, 2006 (aged 75) Orlando, Florida, Florida
- Buried: Palm Cemetery, Winter Park, Florida
- Denomination: Anglican
- Parents: Raymond J. Patterson, Louella Glasgow
- Spouse: JoAnne Nida (m. 1951)
- Children: 2

Donis Dean Patterson (April 27, 1930 – February 3, 2006) was an American bishop of the Episcopal Diocese of Dallas. An alumnus of Ohio State University and the Episcopal Theological School, he was diocesan bishop from 1983 to 1992.

== Early life, military service, and education ==
Patterson was born on April 27, 1930, in Holmesville, Ohio to Raymond J. Patterson and Louella Glasgow. He was educated at Millersburg High School, graduating in 1948. He was an Eagle Scout and recipient of the State Leadership Award from the 4-H Clubs of Ohio. He also studied at the Ohio State University, graduating with a Bachelor of Science in Agricultural Sciences in 1952. That year he was commissioned by the United States Army and served in Korea with the Eighth Army on the 38th Parallel. Whilst in Korea, he was confirmed in the Episcopal Church by Cecil Cooper, the Bishop of Korea in Seoul Anglican Cathedral on March 17, 1954. After serving his military service he enrolled at the Episcopal Theological School in Cambridge, Massachusetts and earned a Bachelor of Sacred Theology in 1957. He served as a chaplain in the United States Army Reserve between 1954 and 1990. He married JoAnne Nida on December 22, 1951, and together had two sons. He also earned a Master of Divinity from the Episcopal Divinity School in 1972, and awarded a Doctor of Divinity from Nashotah House in 1984 and another from the University of the South 1986.

== Ordained ministry ==
Patterson was ordained deacon and priest in 1957. He served as rector of St Andrew's Church in Washington Court House, Ohio between 1957 and 1963 and then of St Mark's Church in Venice, Florida between 1963 and 1970. He was then rector of All Saints' Church in Winter Park, Florida from 1970 until 1983.

== Bishop ==
In June 1983, Patterson was elected Bishop of Dallas and was consecrated on October 29, 1983, in the Prestonwood Baptist Church with Presiding Bishop John Allin as principal consecrator. As bishop, despite his traditionalist views, he was the first to ordain a woman to the priesthood in the diocese in 1985. He was also instrumental in implementing the 1979 Book of Common Prayer reforms in the diocese by 1986. He retired in 1992 and became assistant bishop of the Diocese of the Central Gulf Coast where he served until 1995. He then became bishop-in-residence at St Luke's Cathedral in Orlando, Florida, in 1996 and remained so until his death on February 3, 2006, due to acute leukemia.
