= Christian Episcopal Church =

North American Anglican denomination

- Classification: Continuing Anglican
- Orientation: Anglo-Catholic
- Polity: Episcopal
- Region: United States, Canada, Cayman Islands, United Kingdom
- Origin: 1992
- Separated from: Episcopal Church in the United States and Anglican Church of Canada
- Official website: xnec.us

The Christian Episcopal Church (XnEC) is a Continuing Anglican jurisdiction consisting of parishes in Canada and the United States and with oversight of several parishes in the Cayman Islands. Its bishops claim apostolic succession through the Right Rev. A. Donald Davies. Davies was formerly the bishop-in-charge of the Convocation of American Churches in Europe and the bishop of the Episcopal Diocese of Fort Worth, Texas.

== History ==
Bishop Archibald Donald Davies had, in 1970, been consecrated the fourth bishop of the Episcopal Diocese of Dallas. Fifteen bishops of the Episcopal Church assisted at the consecration of Bishop Davies, with John Elbridge Hines as one of the principal consecrators. Bishop Hines had himself been consecrated the fifth bishop of the Episcopal Diocese of Texas in 1945, and was later elected the Presiding Bishop of the Episcopal Church in the United States of America.

In 1992, following years of controversy in the Episcopal Church in the USA and the Anglican Church of Canada over what conservative members considered a steady drift towards both political and religious liberalism, the Episcopal Missionary Church (EMC) was founded. Although this was 15 years after the Congress of St. Louis, at which Anglicans from the United States and Canada created the Continuing Anglican Movement in opposition to women's ordination, Book of Common Prayer alterations, and more relaxed sexual standards approved in the ECUSA, the EMC is usually considered a continuing church. Bishop Davies was elected its first presiding bishop. He was also elected archbishop and primate of the several parishes constituting the Christian Episcopal Church of Canada.

A decade later, a split in the Episcopal Missionary Church's Diocese of the West produced the Christian Episcopal Church in the USA. Those who had left the diocese then appealed to Bishop Davies and joined with churches in Canada. At one time, the XnEC in the United States counted parishes in Mississippi, South Carolina, California, Arizona, Texas and other states, but at present its parishes are in Washington State, Oregon, Hawaiʻi, and Florida.

Every bishop in the Christian Episcopal Church can claim to have received episcopal orders through the succession of bishops of the Church of England and the Scottish Episcopal Church, as well as the Episcopal Church in the USA. The current archbishop and primate is The Rt. Rev. Tim Klerekoper, while the Christian Episcopal Church of Canada is headed by Robert David Redmile.

In September 2017, it was announced by Archbishop Theodore Casimes that Gavin Ashenden had been consecrated as a missionary bishop in the United Kingdom and Europe by the Christian Episcopal Church. However, on the Fourth Sunday in Advent 2019, Ashenden was received into the Roman Catholic Church by Bishop Mark Davies, the Bishop of Shrewsbury, in Shrewsbury Cathedral.

== Bibliography ==
- The Apostolic Succession and the Catholic Episcopate in the Christian Episcopal by Robert David Redmile, published by Xulon, 2006 ISBN 1600345166| pages 66,85-86
