= Church of the Incarnation (Dallas, Texas) =

- Church of the Incarnation
- Location: 3966 McKinney Ave (at Cambrick); Dallas, Texas
- Country: United States
- Denomination: Episcopal
- Churchmanship: High Church
- Website: incarnation.org

History
- Former name: Cathedral Chapel of the Incarnation
- Founded: 1879
- Founder: Alexander Charles Garrett
- Dedicated: 1897

Architecture
- Style: Neo-Gothic
- Completed: 1927

Administration
- Province: Province VII
- Diocese: Dallas

Clergy
- Bishop: Robert P. Price
- Rector: Gregory Brewer (interim)
- Priest(s): Oliver Lee; Jordan Griesbeck; Parker Williams

The Church of the Incarnation is a parish of the Diocese of Dallas of the Episcopal Church, located at 3966 McKinney Avenue in Dallas, Texas.

The church was founded in 1879 by Bishop Alexander Garrett as the Cathedral Chapel of the Incarnation. It was originally built on the corner of McKinney and Harwood, to a considerable degree north of Dallas's business and residential community. In 1897 the mission church became a full-fledged parish of the Diocese of Dallas. In 1902 a brick building was dedicated and used as the church for the next twenty-five years. In 1927 the church moved to a new building farther north on McKinney at Cambrick Avenue. Sixteen rectors have served the church since its founding and the modest brick chapel has become a 5-acre (20,000 m^{2}) close serving the Dallas community with a Christian volunteer force of 1,800 households.

The church is one of 74 Episcopal churches and missions in the Diocese of Dallas, which is a member of Province VII of the Episcopal Church of the United States (TEC) and a part of the worldwide Anglican Communion. The interim rector is the Rt. Rev. Gregory Brewer. It is one of the largest parishes in the Episcopal Church. The church reported 4,947 members in 2019 and 5,094 members in 2023; no membership statistics were reported in 2024 parochial reports. Plate and pledge income reported for the congregation in 2024 was $6,095,756 with average Sunday attendance (ASA) of 1,005 persons, making it the second most attended church in the denomination after only St. Martin's Episcopal Church (Houston).

== Architecture & Worship Spaces ==
The Main Campus facility located at 3966 McKinney Ave, with the exception of the Great Hall and school building, was constructed in a neo-Gothic style. The worship spaces contain traditional Anglican furnishings and stained glass.

=== The Church ===
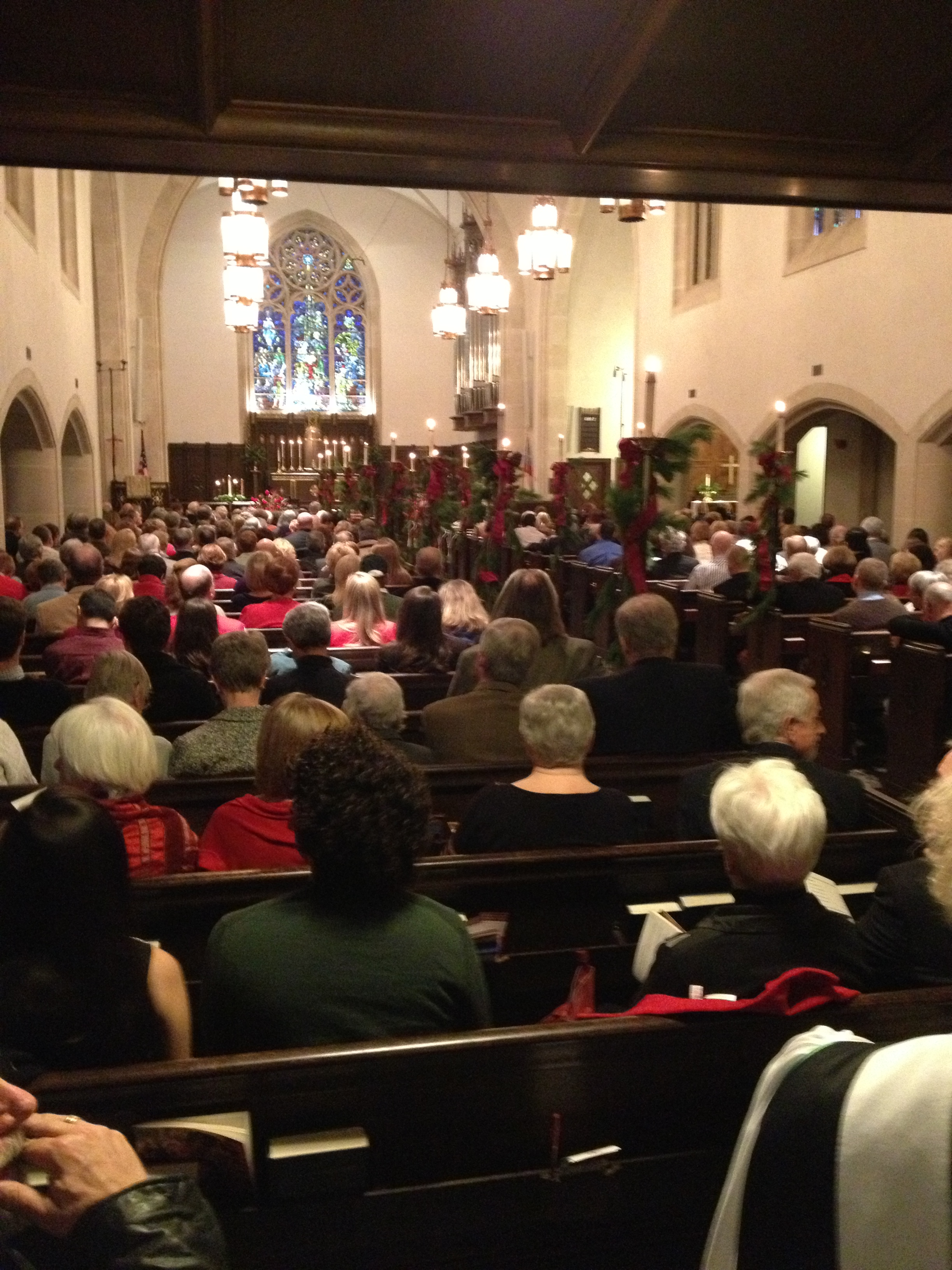
A view of the nave just before Lessons & Carols 2012

The Church is arranged in a cruciform layout. The nave and both transepts are used for congregational seating, and the rear gallery is used as overflow seating when needed. The north transept faces the crossing, while the south transept faces forward (east) toward a second altar, allowing it to function as an attached chapel. The south transept also contains a large stained glass window depicting Jesus as the "Good Shepherd". The Good Shepherd window backs up to the organ chamber, which prevents natural light from illuminating it, so it is lit artificially from behind. The cruciform layout of the church also serves as a symbol of the body of Christ.

The chancel is divided into three distinct sections. The first is where the pulpit, lectern, and seating for the clergy are found. The pulpit is on the left (north) side of the chancel, and the lectern on the right (south) side. The presider sits on the right side, but to the left of the pulpit, facing the center. The subdeacon and one assisting priest sit behind him on the other side of the pulpit. The acting deacon sits on the opposite (north) side with the preacher behind. All of the clergy sit facing across the chancel.

The next section of the chancel contains the choir stalls. The stalls face the center and have three rows on either side of the chancel which increase in height moving out from the center. They can comfortably seat around 40 people and are outfitted with seated-height music racks.

The third section of the chancel is the proper sanctuary. Its focal point is the carved wood altar with its gold leafing and relief carvings. On the north side of the sanctuary sits the cathedra, along with two benches. In the north wall is the aumbry, which is used for the reservation of the Sacrament. On the opposite wall are three more seats. Dividing the sanctuary from the chancel are wooden altar rails with red embroidered kneelers. Communion is distributed continuously, but kneeling is still expected for those who are able.

Above the chancel on the north side is the organ loft. The large console of the Noack organ faces away from the chancel, requiring the use of either a television monitor or a series of mirrors for the organist to see the conductor below. Directly opposite the loft on the south wall is the organ itself. The Gothic facade speaks directly across the space, and the chamber extends straight back to the same depth as the south transept (obscuring the stained glass). The chamber takes up the entire square space on the southeast corner of the main church.

The nave has a single central aisle with pews on either side. The outside ambulatory aisles are separated from the nave by a row of Gothic pointed arches, so they do not bisect the pews. The last several pews are located beneath the gallery. Also under the gallery is the baptistry, which cuts a square area out of the pew space on the north side of the nave. There is a narthex separating the nave from the west door. Staircases on either side of the narthex lead to the gallery.

Outside and on the south side of the nave is a single cloister which connects the narthex with the hallway leading through the center of the church campus. The participants in the service (clergy, choir, etc.) gather for prayer prior to the celebration of the Eucharist in this space, weather permitting.

=== Ascension Chapel ===
The Ascension Chapel was completed in 2015 as the worship space for the Uptown Contemporary Service. In 2017, a new stained glass window was installed above the altar, created in collaboration with Canterbury Cathedral Studios in 13th-century style artistic design and craftwork. [More description needed.]

=== Memorial Chapel ===
The memorial chapel was the original worship space on the current church site. Although the traditional services have long since outgrown it, daily office services are held in it, in addition to wedding, funerals, and the like. The layout is traditional. The furnishings are similar to those in the main church, simply on a slightly smaller scale. The celebrant performs the Eucharistic rite at an eastward facing altar. The chancel area is separated from the nave by a large Gothic arch, behind which is a set of curtains which can block off that space when the chapel is being used for functions other than worship, though they are rarely used as such.

The organ is situated on the back wall, with the largest pipes of the pedal division flanking the west door. The swell shades can be seen behind the acoustic fabric panels hung in front of them. The console is on the north side of the gallery, which runs the length of the nave along both sides. The console, as in the main church, faces the wall. A small space for a choir of about 12-16 voices is available around the console.

The baptistry in the chapel is located adjacent to the entrance from the main hallway on the north side of the nave. On the opposite side of the nave and set off by a wood slat wall is a small chapel containing one of the two columbaria of the church (the other being outside), after which the chapel takes its name since it is not named for a particular person.

The chapel also has a narthex which provides access to the upper gallery, as well as to some of the audio-visual equipment that is utilized by the contemporary services held in the chapel. Stained glass can be found surrounding the chapel, the finest of which is in the small columbarium chapel.

== Liturgy ==
The Church of the Incarnation, being a parish of the Episcopal Church, uses the 1979 Book of Common Prayer (BCP) as its standard for worship. Each Sunday the Eucharist is celebrated six times, in addition to five times during the week. Both of the rites provided in the Book of Common Prayer are used. The traditional services use Rite I while the contemporary services use a Rite II. One exception to the use of the 1979 BCP is for Choral Evensong. Earlier versions of the BCP included rites for this service, but the closest thing to be found in the most recent edition is a rite for evening prayer. Therefore, the rite used had to be taken from a different edition. The rite used is found in the 1662 BCP, which remains the primary edition in the Church of England. Another exception is that, while in Rite II of the 1979 BCP, the congregation's response to the Dominus Vobiscum is "And also with you," in the contemporary services at Incarnation, the congregation says "And with your spirit," a more literal contemporary rendering of the original Latin "Et cum spiritu tuo."

=== Anglo-Catholicism ===
The Church of the Incarnation has been influenced by the Anglo-Catholic tradition, though it is more aptly described as belonging to the "Prayerbook Catholic" tradition. A few of the identifying practices seen in the parish include the celebration of Choral Evensong (including the use of incense), the hearing of private confessions, the invocation of the Virgin Mary and other saints for the purpose of intercession, a limited Marian devotion, and the "high-church" liturgy used in the traditional services.

This high-church style is reflected most obviously in the vestments and other liturgical clothing used by participants in the Mass. The choir and lay servers wear black cassocks and full-length surplices, the vergers wear cassocks and black vergers' gowns, and the assisting clergy vest as the choir with the addition of a stole (or tippet for the priest who is preaching). The participating clergy wear eucharistic vestments. The three participating clerics wear amices and maniples, the presider wears a chasuble, the deacons a dalmatic, and the subdeacon (an uncommon office outside of Anglo-Catholicism) a tunicle. Because he is also a bishop, the rector from 2008 to 2022, Anthony Burton, wore a mitre in addition to the chasuble. At other times, he sometimes wore a scarlet chimere over his rochet. All of the eucharistic vestments were replaced in 2013 by Watts & Co. of London. For Evensong, the presiding priest vests in a cope.

The current liturgical style is in contrast to the low church tradition of the parish which existed from its founding until late 1970's. Prior to that time priests were addressed with the title "Mister" rather than "Father". The primary weekly liturgy was Morning Prayer. The priests wore simple vestments. The celebrant never sung or chanted the liturgy nor were any accoutrements of high church Anglicanism present, such as bells or incense.

== Music ==
The Church of the Incarnation is well known throughout North Texas and the nation as a center for musical excellence. The program is divided into two segments, one traditional and the other contemporary. Together they provide the music for five of the six worship services held each Sunday throughout the academic year.

=== Traditional ===
The traditional component of the church's music program is under the direction of organist/choirmaster Kit Jacobson, who joined the parish staff in 2023. This post was previously held by Scott Dettra (formerly of Washington National Cathedral and St. Paul's, K Street) from 2012 to 2022. Previous directors include Richard Sparks (2011-2012, interim), Christopher Berry (2009-2011), Kevin Clarke (1990-2008), and Russell Brydon (1947-1990). Jacobson is currently assisted by organist Owen Reid.

For choral evensong, which is held each Sunday from September through May, the choir takes after the English cathedral and collegiate tradition in following the rite set forth in the 1662 Book of Common Prayer. The choirs use one setting of the Preces and Responses throughout the month, many settings of the Magnificat and Nunc Dimittis are used in rotation, and the remaining music is determined by the propers for the day. In December 2012 the ensemble was heard in a nationwide broadcast of their annual Service of Lessons & Carols; the broadcast was carried by Public Radio International.

==== Tours and concerts ====
The choir has made several pilgrimages to the United Kingdom, a practice which began in 1998 with a residency at Chichester Cathedral. During these tours, the choir establishes week-long residencies at various churches and cathedrals throughout the country. The first week is spent in a different venue each year. The most recent UK trip, in July 2019, was to York Minster; previously, in July 2011, the choir went to St. George's Chapel, Windsor and Canterbury Cathedral. The second week has then usually consisted of a residency at Westminster Abbey. In July 2014 the choir sang services at the National Cathedral in Washington and at Saint Thomas Church and the Cathedral of Saint John the Divine in New York City.

==== Organ ====
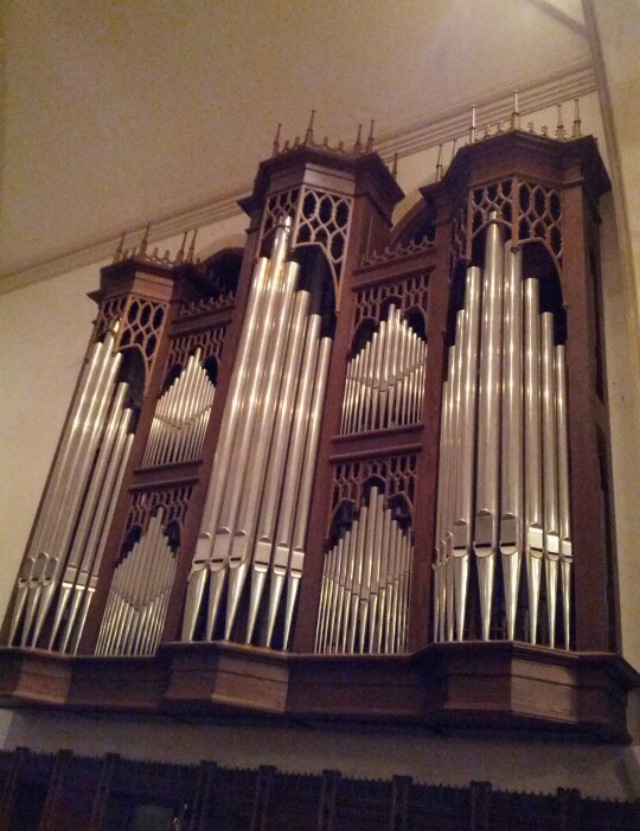
Facade of the Noack organ

The main worship space of the church which is used for the traditional liturgies has a substantial pipe organ redesigned, enlarged and rebuilt from the original 1960 Aeolian-Skinner by the Noack Organ Company in 1994 with further revisions by Noack in 2015. The organ has four manuals (keyboards) and 62 stops spread over 74 ranks and 4,110 pipes.

Great
Diapason	16′
Diapason	8′
Second Diapason	8'
Bourdon	8'
Spielflöte	8'
Octave	4'
Harmonic Flute	4′
Twelfth	2^{2}/_{3}′
Fifteenth	2′
Seventeenth	1^{3}/_{5}′
Mixture IV	1^{1}/_{3}′
Sharp III	^{2}/_{3}′
Trumpet	16′
Trumpet	8'
Clarion	4'

Swell
Bourdon	16′
Diapason	8′
Chimney Flute	8′
Gamba	8′
Celeste	8′
Octave	4′
Koppelflöte	4′
Principal	2′
Mixture IV	2'
Cornet III	2^{2}/_{3}′
Bassoon	16′
Trumpet	8′
Oboe	8′
Clarion	4'

Choir
Gemshorn	16′
Geigen	8′
Gedackt	8′
Flute Douce	8′
Flute Celeste	8′
Principal	4′
Rohrflöte	4′
Blockflöte	2′
Larigot	1^{1}/_{3}′
Trompette	8'
Clarinet	8′
Vox Humana	8′

Solo
Harmonic Flute	8′
Salicional	8′
Celeste	8′
Open Flute	4′
English Horn	8′
French Horn	8′
Tuba	8'
Festival Trumpet (ant.)	8′

Pedal
Bourdon	32′
Open Wood	16′
Diapason (Gt.)	16′
Stopt Bass	16′
Gemshorn	16′
Diapason	8′
Gedackt	8′
Octave	4′
Mixture IV	2^{2}/_{3}′
Trombone	32′
Trombone	16′
Trumpet	8′
Clarion	4′

==== Other organs ====
The chapel contains a two manual Wicks organ.

The church's previous location at McKinney and Harwood contained a two manual, 19 stop organ built in 1910 by the Pilcher Organ Co. of Louisville, Kentucky

=== Contemporary music ===
The church's contemporary music program consists of a praise band-style group of instrumentalists, under the direction of Wendell Kimbrough. The Uptown Contemporary services are held simultaneously with their traditional counterparts at 9 am and 11:15 am on Sundays and are held in Ascension Chapel, part of a substantial building project completed in 2015. The services feature contemporary music, contemporary settings of hymns, and settings of the Psalms that incorporate the reading of Scripture and a sung congregational refrain.

== Outreach ==
The parish is known for its commitment to outreach and community service. A mentorship program with neighboring North Dallas High School has been very successful, and similar programs have begun at other area schools as a response. Also popular among parishioners are the mission trips to Belize and Honduras. In total, the parish has dozens of different outreach ministries, and there are two permanent staff positions exclusive to the department.

== See also ==
- Anglicanism
- Anglo-Catholicism
- Christianity
- High Church
