= Robert Terwilliger =

Robert Terwilliger may refer to:

- Sideshow Bob (Robert Onderdonk Terwilliger), a recurring character in the animated television series The Simpsons
- Robert E. Terwilliger (1917–1991), suffragan bishop of the Episcopal Diocese of Dallas
