= Archibald Davies =

Archibald Davies may refer to:

- Donald Davies (bishop) (Archibald Donald Davies, 1920–2011), American Anglican bishop
- Archibald John Davies (1877–1953), English stained glass artist
