= Harry Tunis Moore =

American bishop

The Right Reverend Harry Tunis Moore
- Bishop of Dallas
- Church: Episcopal Church
- Diocese: Dallas
- Elected: May 8, 1917
- In office: 1924–1946
- Predecessor: Alexander Charles Garrett
- Successor: C. Avery Mason
- Previous post: Coadjutor Bishop of Dallas (1917-1924)

Orders
- Ordination: August 28, 1902 by Isaac Lea Nicholson
- Consecration: October 4, 1917 by Daniel S. Tuttle

Personal details
- Born: October 4, 1874 Delavan, Wisconsin, United States
- Died: October 6, 1955 (aged 81) Dallas, Texas, United States
- Denomination: Anglican
- Parents: Tunis Moore, Hannah Rector
- Spouse: Annette Irene Reeme (m. 1907)

Harry Tunis Moore (October 4, 1874 — October 6, 1955) was the second bishop of Dallas in The Episcopal Church.

== Early life ==
Moore was born in Delavan, Wisconsin on October 4, 1874, the son of Tunis Moore and Hannah Rector. He studied at Beloit College and Hobart College and graduated with a Bachelor of Arts in 1899, and awarded a Doctor of Laws in 1923. He studied at the Western Theological Seminary and earned a Bachelor of Divinity in 1902, and was awarded a Doctor of Divinity in 1917.

== Ordained ministry ==
Moore was ordained deacon on March 2, 1902, and priest on August 28, 1902 by Bishop Isaac Lea Nicholson of Milwaukee in Christ Church,Delavan, Wisconsin. He married Annette Irene Reeme on August 8, 1907. He served as assistant at Christ Church in Delavan, Wisconsin in 1902 and then rector of St James' Church in Fremont, Nebraska between 1902 and 1904. In 1904 he became rector of St Mark's Church in San Antonio, Texas, while in 1905 he transferred to Chicago to serve as rector of Grace Church. Between 1906 and 1907 he was rector of Emmanuel Church in Champaign, Illinois and then Dean of St Matthew's Cathedral in Dallas, Texas between 1907 and 1917.

== Bishop ==
On May 8, 1917, Moore was elected Coadjutor Bishop of Dallas and was consecrated on October 4, 1917, by Presiding Bishop Daniel S. Tuttle. He succeeded as diocesan bishop on February 18, 1924, and retired on October 4, 1946, due to ill health. He died on October 6, 1955.
