= Scott Dettra =

American concert organist and church musician

Scott Dettra (born 1975) is an American concert organist, ragtime pianist, harpsichordist, and church musician. He tours in North America and Europe, and is a former Director of Music and Organist at the Church of the Incarnation in Dallas, Texas. He is also Director of the period-instrument group Ensemble XIV, and Organist of The Crossing, a professional chamber choir based in Philadelphia. From 2007 to 2012, he was Organist of Washington National Cathedral.

== Biography ==
A native of Wilmington, Delaware, he studied music at an early age, beginning piano lessons at age three and organ lessons at age eight, taught primarily by his father. He holds two degrees from Westminster Choir College in Princeton, New Jersey, where he was a student of Joan Lippincott, and has also studied organ and jazz piano at Manhattan School of Music. He tours extensively as a concert organist, performing at many prominent churches, concert halls, and universities in the United States and abroad. He has been a featured performer at several national conventions of the American Guild of Organists, the Association of Anglican Musicians, the Association of Lutheran Church Musicians, and the American Choral Directors Association. Festival appearances include the Lincoln Center Festival, the Piccolo Spoleto Festival, the Carmel Bach Festival, the Arizona Bach Festival, and the Bermuda Festival of the Performing Arts. As a church musician, he has held positions at Trinity Church, Princeton, Saint Mark's, Locust Street in Philadelphia, Saint Paul's, K Street in Washington, DC, and Washington National Cathedral. Other former positions include Keyboard Artist of the Washington Bach Consort, Assistant Conductor of the Cathedral Choral Society, and Principal Accompanist of the American Boychoir.

== Discography ==
He is featured on more than 25 recordings as a soloist, conductor, or collaborator.

- Besieged with The Crossing (Navona, 2026)
- Bach: St. John Passion with Dallas Bach Society (Onyx Classics, 2026)
- J.S. Bach: Organ Works, Vol. 1 (Lawton, 2025)
- Numina (Orenda, 2025)
- Ways You Went with The Crossing (Navona, 2024)
- The Anglo-American Classic Organ (Gothic, 2019)
- Choral Evensong for Eastertide with the Incarnation Choir (Gothic, 2018)
- The Holy City: Choral Music of James D'Angelo (Gothic, 2014)
- A Festival of Nine Lessons and Carols with the Incarnation Choir (Incarnation, 2013)
- New American Choral Music Series: William Bradley Roberts (Gothic, 2013)
- Christmas Daybreak with The Crossing (Innova, 2013)
- Majestus: The Great Organ of Washington National Cathedral (Loft, 2010)
- J.S. Bach - Solo Cantatas with Elizabeth Futral, soprano and the Washington Bach Consort (Lyrichord, 2009)
- Evensong: Of Love and Angels - Dominick Argento with the Cathedral Choral Society (Gothic, 2009)
- Messiah with the choir of Washington National Cathedral (Gothic, 2010)
- Voices of Angels with the American Boychoir (Albemarle, 2004)
- Messe Basse with the American Boychoir (Albemarle, 2004)
- Lullaby - Music for the Quiet Times with the American Boychoir (Albemarle, 2002)
- Litton Live! - The Farewell Concert with the American Boychoir (Albemarle, 2001)
- Mass & Vespers for the Feast of the Holy Innocents with the American Boychoir (Linn, 2000)
- The Kotzschmar Memorial Organ 1999 Summer Season (AFKA, 2000)
- The Day of Resurrection - Evensong for Easter Day Saint Paul's, K Street (Pro Organo, 1999)
- Tongues of Fire (Pro Organo, 1999)
- Show Yourselves Joyful Saint Paul's, K Street (Pro Organo, 1997)
- The Best of Trinity Choirs Trinity Church, Princeton (1998)
- Christmas in Princeton Trinity Church, Princeton (1996)
