= James M. Stanton =

American bishop (born 1946)

The Right Reverend James M. Stanton
- Bishop of Dallas
- Church: Episcopal Church
- Diocese: Dallas
- Elected: 1992
- In office: 1993–2014
- Predecessor: Donis Patterson
- Successor: George R. Sumner

Orders
- Ordination: October 18, 1977 by Victor Rivera
- Consecration: March 6, 1993 by John Allin

Personal details
- Born: October 29, 1946 (age 79) Atchison, Kansas, United States
- Denomination: Anglican
- Spouse: Diane Louise Hanson (m. 1968; died 2021)
- Children: 2

James Monte Stanton (born October 29, 1946) was sixth bishop of the Episcopal Diocese of Dallas, serving from 1993 to 2014.

== Early life and education ==
Stanton was born on October 29, 1946, in Atchison, Kansas. He was initially raised near St. Joseph, Missouri but in 1952 his family, including his sister Jerrie Stanton moved to southern California where he grew up and was educated. He studied at Chapman University and then sought ordination in the Disciples of Christ. He married Diane Louise Hanson in December 1968 and together had two children. He attended Lexington Theological Seminary to pursue theological studies. He transferred to Claremont School of Theology, where he graduated with a Doctor of Ministry in 1975. He also joined the Episcopal Church in 1975 and furthered his studies in the Episcopal ministry at the Church Divinity School of the Pacific between 1976 and 1977.

== Ordained ministry ==
Stanton was ordained deacon by the Bishop of Los Angeles Robert C. Rusack in June 1977, and then priest in October 1977 by the Bishop of San Joaquin Victor Rivera. He served as curate at the Church of St Martin-in-Fields in Los Angeles between 1976 and 1977 and then as vicar of St Stephen's Mission in Stockton, California, between 1977 and 1981. In 1982, he became rector of St Luke's Church in Cedar Falls, Iowa, where he remained until 1987. He returned to California in 1987 to serve as the rector of St Mark's Church in Glendale, California.

== Bishop ==
Towards the end of 1992, Stanton was elected the 6th Bishop of Dallas, and was consecrated bishop on March 6, 1993, at the Morton H. Meyerson Symphony Center with Presiding Bishop John Allin as chief consecrator. During his episcopacy, he managed the diocese through the changes undertaken within the Episcopal Church and successfully maintained unity within the diocese. He retired on May 31, 2014.

Episcopal Church (USA) titles
Preceded by Donis Patterson	Episcopal Bishop of Dallas; 1993–2014	Succeeded by George R. Sumner
New title	President of the American Anglican Council; 1996–2000	Succeeded by David Anderson
