= Gavin Ashenden =

British former Anglican clergyman

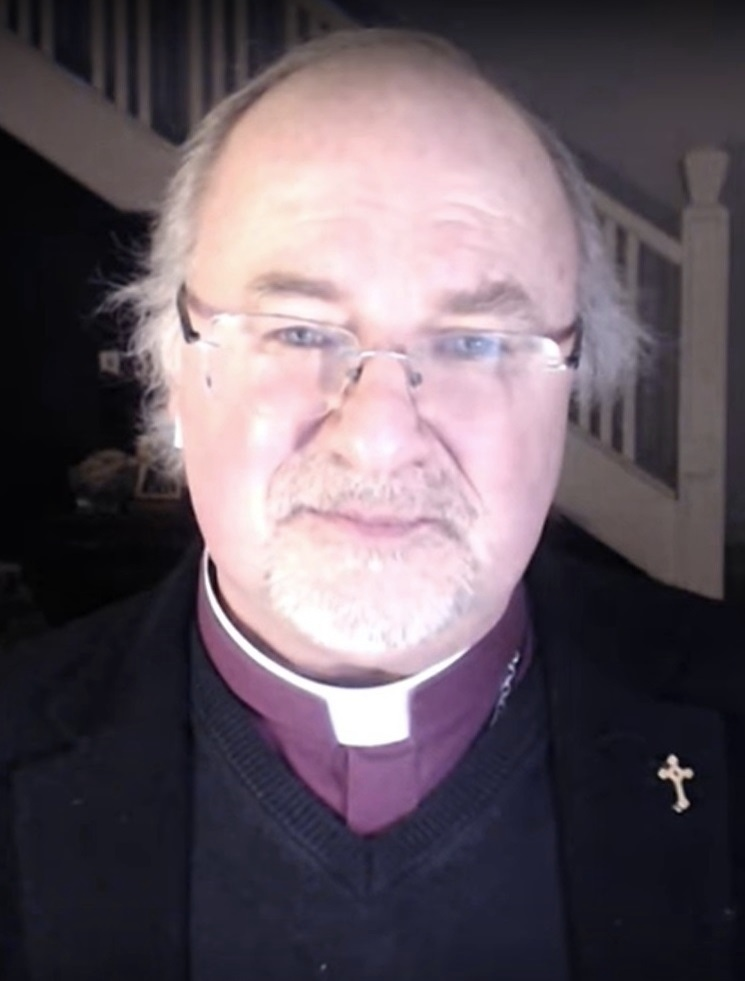
- Ashenden appearing on Anglican Unscripted in 2018
- Church: Catholic Church (since 2019); Formerly; Christian Episcopal Church (2017–2019); Church of England (until 2017)

Orders
- Ordination: 1980 by Bishop Mervyn Stockwood
- Consecration: 2013 by Bishop Theodore Casimes

Personal details
- Born: Gavin Roy Pelham Ashenden; 3 June 1954 (age 72)
- Denomination: Catholicism (since 2019); Formerly; Anglicanism (until 2019)
- Education: Heythrop College; University of London; Oak Hill Theological College; University of Bristol

Gavin Roy Pelham Ashenden (born 3 June 1954) is a British Catholic layman, author and commentator, and associate editor of the Catholic Herald. Formerly a priest of the Church of England, and subsequently a continuing Anglican bishop, he was appointed Chaplain to the Queen from 2008 until his resignation in 2017.

== Early life and education ==
Ashenden was born on 3 June 1954 in London, England, the son of Michael Roy Edward Ashenden and Carol Ashenden (née Simpson, now Salmon). He was educated at Rokeby Preparatory School and as a music scholar at The King's School, Canterbury. He graduated from the University of Bristol, with a degree in law. He trained for the Anglican priesthood at Oak Hill Theological College, where he read for a Bachelor of Arts degree in theology. Whilst at Oak Hill he was also sent as part of his training to the Greek Orthodox Patriarchal Stavropegic Monastery of St. John the Baptist in Tolleshunt Knights, Essex, where he came under the influence of Archimandrite Sophrony (Sakharov).

Ashenden engaged in postgraduate work at Heythrop College at the University of London with a Master of Theology degree on the psychology of religion. Whilst a chaplain and member of faculty at the University of Sussex, he completed a doctorate on the life and work of Charles Williams (1999). He published Charles Williams: Alchemy and Integration, a study of Williams' work in 2007, which was reviewed by the Archbishop Rowan Williams in The Times Literary Supplement. In 2009 he contributed to Charles Williams and His Contemporaries, and in 2012 Persona & Paradox: Issues of Identity for C. S. Lewis, his Friends and Associates

== Ministry and other positions ==
Ashenden was ordained at Southwark Cathedral in 1980 and served as a parish priest for 10 years in the Diocese of Southwark, firstly at St James's Bermondsey and then as vicar of Hamsey Green in Sanderstead.

Between 1989 and 2012 he held the post of university chaplain and senior lecturer in the Department of English at the University of Sussex where he lectured in literature and the psychology of religion. He was appointed a senior officer of the university in 1994. He convened and taught the MA programme "Monotheism and Mysticism in Critical Theology". From 1995 to 2003 he also lectured in systematic theology at the University of Brighton. From 1991 to 2010 he was also a part time chaplain at Roedean.

He was appointed firstly as a canon of Chichester Cathedral in 2003, and subsequently to a further theological canonry (Bursalis Prebendary) in 2006. He was examining chaplain and Diocesan Adviser on New Age Religions to the Bishop of Chichester.

In 1998 he was a Church of England delegate to the 8th Council of the World Council of Churches held in Harare, Zimbabwe. He was a member of the General Synod of the Church of England from 1995 to 2012. He has lectured in the United States, including, in 2003, as a visiting theologian for St. Mark Lutheran Church in Salem, Oregon.

In 2012 he took early retirement from his university post and from 2012 to 2016 was 'house for duty' incumbent as vicar of St Martin de Gouray in Gorey, Jersey.

He was vice-chairman of the Keston Institute during the 1980s, and a director of Aid to Russian Christians, in which role he engaged in smuggling Bibles and medicine to the "Underground Church" in the Soviet Union during that decade.

He was a member of the Society of the Holy Cross, and the Little Brothers of Jesus.

In 2016, Ashenden was appointed to the board of reference for the Global Anglican Future Conference. He also joined Anglican TV Ministries as their UK correspondent.

== Resignation from Church of England positions ==
In early 2017, Ashenden resigned from his position as Chaplain to the Queen after writing in The Times criticising a service at St Mary's Cathedral, Glasgow, at which a Muslim student was invited to read (in Arabic) a passage from Surah 19 of the Quran which explicitly declared Jesus is not the Son of God, and because of his views on Islam and orthodox Christianity. Ashenden concluded his being a member of the Ecclesiastical Household was incompatible with the ability to comment on issues of freedom of speech and the integrity of Christianity in the public square.

One of the consequences of his resignation was a variety of media engagements in several countries, including Fox News in the United States, and The Bolt Report in Australia.

On 17 March 2017, Ashenden lodged a deed in the High Court of London under the Clerical Disabilities Act 1870 (33 & 34 Vict. c. 91), to relinquish his orders within the Church of England.

== Christian Episcopal Church ==
In September 2017 Archbishop Theodore Casimes of the Christian Episcopal Church announced that Ashenden had been consecrated as a missionary bishop for the United Kingdom and Europe. The consecration had actually taken place in 2013, when Ashenden was still a parish priest in the Church of England and a chaplain to the Queen.

Ashenden resigned from the Christian Episcopal Church in December 2019 on being received into the Roman Catholic Church.

== Catholic Church ==
On 22 December 2019, Ashenden was received into the Catholic Church by the Bishop of Shrewsbury, Mark Davies, at Shrewsbury Cathedral. Bishop Davies commented that it was "very humbling to be able to receive a bishop of the Anglican tradition into full communion in the year of the canonization of Saint John Henry Newman."

In 2023, Ashenden criticized the Declaration Fiducia Supplicans of the Dicastery for the Doctrine of the Faith, which allows Catholic priests to impart pastoral blessings onto individuals in irregular couples (same-sex, remarried, and unmarried couples) under certain conditions.

== In the media ==
Between 2008 and 2012 Ashenden presented the Faith and Ethics programme for BBC Sussex and BBC Surrey. From 2009 to 2012, he also presented the BBC podcast Faith in England.

Between 2013 and 2022 he wrote a weekly column in the Jersey Evening Post, where his defence of orthodox Christianity and its critique of modern culture caused both strong support and opposition.

While a continuing Anglican bishop he was a contributor to both Anglican Ink and Anglican Unscripted, before creating a new internet programme 'Catholic Unscripted'.

Ashenden has contributed Op Ed pieces in both The Times and The Daily Telegraph, and written for The Sunday Times. He has featured in The Spectator's religious affairs podcast 'Holy Smoke;' and has written also for Christian Today. In 2021 he became a regular columnist for the Catholic Herald, appointed as an Associate Editor in 2022. He maintains a website for the publication of homilies, articles and commentary at ashenden.org.

He was interviewed by Rod Liddle for The Sunday Times over the controversy surrounding Bishop Michael Curry's sermon following the Royal Wedding in 2018. BBC 2's Newsnight took up the issue when the Archbishop of Canterbury raised questions about God and gender. John Anderson, formerly deputy prime minister of Australia, conducted an interview on the dangers to freedom of speech in his series "conversations", and he has become a regular guest on GB News.

Ashenden has written on Russian Orthodox spirituality in A Guidebook to the Spiritual Life (ed. Peter Toon). He also wrote The Oxford Inklings and about C. S. Lewis in Persona and Paradox.

== Distinctions ==
=== Styles and titles ===
- The Reverend Gavin Ashenden (1980–1999)
- The Reverend Dr Gavin Ashenden (1999–2003)
- The Reverend Canon Dr Gavin Ashenden (1997–1999)
- The Right Reverend Dr Gavin Ashenden (2017–2019)
- Dr Gavin Ashenden (2019–present)
