= Russell Kendrick =

The Right Reverend James Russell Kendrick
- Bishop of the Central Gulf Coast
- Church: Episcopal Church
- Diocese: Central Gulf Coast
- Elected: February 21, 2015
- In office: 2015–present
- Predecessor: Philip M. Duncan II

Orders
- Ordination: 1996
- Consecration: July 25, 2015 by Katharine Jefferts Schori

Personal details
- Born: August 2, 1961 (age 65) Fort Walton Beach, Florida, United States
- Denomination: Anglican
- Spouse: Robin Kendrick
- Children: 2
- Education: Auburn University

James Russell Kendrick (born August 2, 1961) is the fourth and current bishop of the Episcopal Diocese of the Central Gulf Coast.

== Biography ==
Kendrick was born on August 2, 1961, in Fort Walton Beach, Florida. He graduated with a Bachelor of Arts in architecture and marketing from Auburn University in 1984. He later studied at the Virginia Theological Seminary, graduating with a Master of Divinity in 1995. He was ordained deacon in 1995 and priest in 1996. He then became assistant to the rector of the Church of the Nativity in Dothan, Alabama. In 2007 he became rector of St. Stephen's Church in Vestavia Hills, Alabama.

Kendrick was elected on the third ballot as the fourth bishop of the Central Gulf Coast on February 21, 2015, during the 44th annual convention of the diocese held at Trinity Church in Mobile, Alabama. He was consecrated on July 25, 2015, with Presiding Bishop Katharine Jefferts Schori as chief consecrator.

== See also ==
- List of Episcopal bishops of the United States
- Historical list of bishops of the Episcopal Church in the United States of America
