= Donald Davies (bishop) =

American bishop

The Most Reverend A. Donald Davies
- Archbishop and Primate of the Christian Episcopal Church
- In office: 2002–2004
- Successor: Theodore C. Casimes
- Previous posts: Presiding Bishop of the Episcopal Missionary Church (1992–2002), Suffragan-in-Charge of Europe (1986–1989), Bishop of Fort Worth (1975–1985), Bishop of Dallas (1970–1975)

Orders
- Ordination: 1950
- Consecration: June 22, 1970

Personal details
- Born: Archibald Donald Davies; April 15, 1920 Pittsburgh, Pennsylvania, US
- Died: October 16, 2011 (aged 91) Granbury, Texas, US
- Denomination: Episcopal
- Parents: Archibald Davies
- Spouse: Mabel Roberts (m. 1939)
- Children: 3 sons and 2 daughters
- Education: University of Tulsa; Western Theological Seminary

Archibald Donald Davies (April 15, 1920 – October 16, 2011) was an American Anglican bishop. A native of Pittsburgh, Pennsylvania, he became the fourth Episcopal bishop of Dallas and subsequently the first Episcopal bishop of Fort Worth. Davies was also a founder of the Evangelical and Catholic Mission, and later founded the Episcopal Missionary Church, after which he became Archbishop and Primate of the Christian Episcopal Church (XnEC).

== Formative years ==
Born in Pittsburgh, Pennsylvania on April 15, 1920, Davies was a son of Archibald Davies, a designer of blast furnaces for that city's active steel industry. During the mid-1930s, Davies met his future wife, Mabel Myrtle Roberts (1920-2010) while they were both tenth grade students. They were subsequently married on Christmas Day in 1939.

=== Education ===
Davies graduated from the University of Tulsa in 1944, and earned his master's degree three years later from the Western Theological Seminary, a Presbyterian seminary in Pittsburgh, Pennsylvania, now Pittsburgh Theological Seminary.Seabury-Western Theological Seminary). He then also earned a Doctor of Divinity degree.

== Teaching career and religious life ==
Davies joined the faculties of Huron College and the University of Tulsa, teaching philosophy and religion to students there while also fulfilling the requirements toward obtaining his Doctor of Divinity degree. Ordained to the diaconate at the Episcopal Diocese of Kansas by Bishop Goodrich Fenner in 1950, Davies then served as deacon-in-charge for one year before becoming rector. Chair of the Department of Christian Education, he also served on the Executive Council and Standing Committee.

Two years later, he was appointed rector at St. Paul's in Manhattan, Kansas; in addition, he spent three years as the campus chaplain for Kansas State University. He was then also appointed as a chaplain in the United States Army Reserve in 1954. From 1954 to 1958, he was employed by New York City's Episcopal Church Center, where he developed a teaching series for the church.

Appointed as rector of Grace Church in Monroe, Louisiana in 1958, he remained there for four years, during which time he was also appointed as a Fellow of the College of Preachers at Washington Cathedral. An active duty chaplain at Fort Hood in Texas from 1962 to 1964, he then was appointed as professor and sub-dean at Seabury-Western. Appointed dean of Trinity Cathedral in Omaha, Nebraska in 1968, Davies began his study of the life of Alexander Charles Garrett, the first bishop of the Episcopal Diocese of Dallas.

Elected as the bishop of the Episcopal Diocese of Dallas in March 1970, in response to the sudden death of Avery Mason who had died suddenly while holding that position, Davies was subsequently ordained as the bishop for Dallas on June 22, 1970, the fourth man to hold that post.

When the Diocese of Dallas opted to form a new western diocese in November 1982, Davies chose to become the bishop for this new diocese — The Episcopal Diocese of Fort Worth — a post he continued to hold until his 1985 retirement.

In 2005, Davies was preceded in death by his 54-year-old son, Allan David Davies, who died on May 22 in Granbury, Texas. He was then widowed by his wife, Mabel, on June 19, 2010; she was subsequently buried at the Acton Cemetery in Acton, Texas. They had been married for nearly 70 years.

== Death and interment ==
Davies died on October 16, 2011, at the age of 91. A Requiem was held at 11 a.m. on Friday, Oct. 21, 2011 at the Church of the Good Shepherd in Granbury, Texas. Davies was then interred beside his wife at the Acton Cemetery in Acton, Texas.

Episcopal Church (USA) titles
| Preceded by C. Avery Mason | Bishop of Dallas; 1970–1975 | Succeeded by Donis D. Patterson |
| New title | Bishop of Fort Worth; 1975–1985 | Succeeded by Clarence C. Pope |
| Preceded by Edmond L. Browning | Suffragan-in-Charge of the Convocation of Episcopal Churches in Europe; 1986–1989 | Succeeded by Jeffery Rowthorn |
Religious titles
| New title | Presiding Bishop of the Episcopal Missionary Church; 1992–2000 | Succeeded by William Millsaps |
| New title | Archbishop and Primate of the Christian Episcopal Church; 2002–2004 | Succeeded by Theodore C. Casimes |
