= William Millsaps =

20th and 21st-century bishop of the Episcopal Missionary Church

- Presiding Bishop
- Church: Episcopal Missionary Church
- See: Diocese of the South
- In office: 2000 to 2010; 2014-
- Predecessor: A. Donald Davies; Council Nedd II (between terms)

Personal details
- Born: December 19, 1939 (age 86) Greenwood, Mississippi

William Wesley Millsaps (born December 19, 1939) is a Continuing Anglican bishop. He is bishop of the Episcopal Missionary Church. He is the rector of Christ Church in Monteagle, Tennessee. He had served previously as presiding bishop from 2001-2010. He was elected again in December 2014 at a Synod held at Christ Church, Warrenton, Virginia.

Millsaps graduated from Princeton University with a Bachelor of Arts degree in 1961. At the General Theological Seminary he received a Master of Divinity degree in 1966, and he received a Doctor of Ministry degree in 1978 from the Perkins School of Theology, Southern Methodist University.

Millsaps served as a parish minister for The Church of the Incarnation in Dallas, Texas, and as a school chaplain at St. Mark’s School and Canterbury House, the Episcopal chapel at Southern Methodist University. From 1981 to 1987 he was the university chaplain at the University of the South at Sewanee, Tennessee.

Millsaps was originally consecrated a bishop for the American Episcopal Church on 26 January 1991 in the Chapel of the Cross in Dallas, Texas by Primus Anthony F. M. Clavier of the AEC, assisted by Bishops Mark Holliday, Walter Grundorf, G. Raymond Hanlan, and Norman Stewart.

On 3 October 1991 he was sub-conditione consecrated as a bishop in the Anglican Catholic Church by retired Anglican Communion traditionalist bishops Robert W. S. Mercer, Charles Boynton, and Robert Mize. From 2000 to 2010, he was the presiding bishop of the Episcopal Missionary Church. As of 2013, he is bishop for that body's Diocese of the South.

Religious titles
Preceded by A. Donald Davies	Presiding Bishop of the Episcopal Missionary Church; 2000 to 2010	Succeeded by Council Nedd II
