= Episcopal Diocese of the Central Gulf Coast =

Episcopal Church diocese in the US

Coordinates: 30°41′21.74″N 88°2′26.48″W

Diocese of Central Gulf Coast

Location
- Country: United States
- Ecclesiastical province: Province IV

Statistics
- Congregations: 61 (2024).
- Members: 16,803 (2023).

Information
- Denomination: Episcopal Church
- Established: December 3, 1970
- Cathedral: Christ Church Cathedral

Current leadership
- Bishop: Russell Kendrick

Map
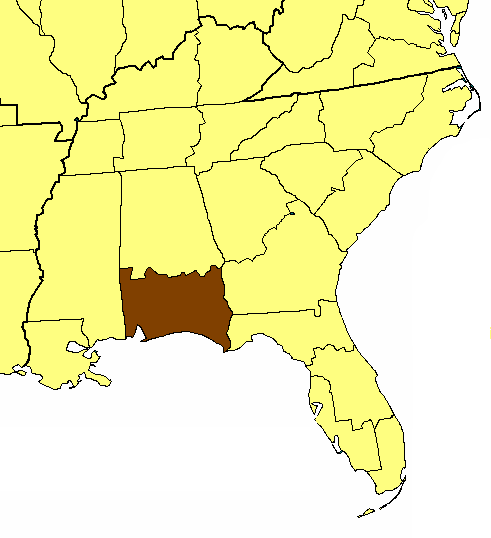
- Location of the Diocese of Central Gulf Coast

Website
- www.diocgc.org

The Episcopal Diocese of the Central Gulf Coast is a diocese of the Episcopal Church in the United States of America, part of Province 4. The diocese was created in 1970 from portions of the adjoining dioceses of Alabama and Florida.

Its territory encompasses the southern third of Alabama and the Florida Panhandle region, west of the Appalachicola River. Most of its churches are located in the Mobile, Alabama area and in a population strip along the Gulf of Mexico extending from Pensacola to Panama City, Florida; most of the remaining churches are located in Alabama, typically in towns with greater than 10,000 population. Historically, the diocese's congregations have favored low, or evangelical, churchmanship, with a generally more conservative theological and cultural tone than the Episcopal Church nationally. However, in most places, and especially in smaller municipalities, they are often the most liberal and tolerant religious options available to residents.

Diocesan offices are located in Pensacola, while the cathedral is Christ Church Cathedral in Mobile, making it one of only a few dioceses in the Episcopal Church where the diocesan offices and cathedral are located in different cities and the only diocese in which they are located in different states.

The diocese reported 18,291 members in 2015 and 16,803 members in 2023; no membership statistics were reported in 2024 national parochial reports. Plate and pledge income for the 61 filing congregations of the diocese in 2024 was $16,988,332. Average Sunday attendance (ASA) was 4,526 persons. This is a decrease from ASA of 5,686 in 2017.

== A Brief History ==
The Diocese of the Central Gulf Coast was organized in 1970 by combining the southern part of the Diocese of Alabama and the western section of the Diocese of Florida. In both the Diocese of Alabama and that of Florida, the problems of adequately caring for parishes had become greater over time, especially as congregations in the Mobile and Pensacola areas, at the far edge of each diocese, had grown. Bishops George Murray (Alabama) and E. Hamilton West (Florida) agreed that joining the southern counties of Alabama with the western portion of the Diocese of Florida was the best solution to the problem. Meeting at Christ Church, Pensacola, on December 3–5, 1970, the Primary Convention of the new diocese adopted canons and elected officers with the Right Reverend George Murray becoming the first bishop of the Diocese of the Central Gulf Coast.

In 1971 the new diocese included 25 parishes and 32 missions along with Beckwith Camp & Conference Center, a camp and conference center located on Weeks Bay on the Alabama Gulf Coast and Wilmer Hall Children’s Home in Mobile. The new diocesan offices at Wilmer Hall opened in January 1971. For 10 years Bishop Murray traveled throughout the diocese shepherding his flock, providing steady leadership during a period of great change in the Episcopal Church, not the least being the adoption of a new prayer book and the ordination of women, things that some parishioners were strongly outspoken against. In 1979, shortly after celebrating the 25th anniversary of his consecration as Bishop, he announced to the Standing Committee his intention to retire.

Meeting at St. Paul’s Church in Mobile on November 14–15, 1980, a special convention of the Diocese elected the Rev. Charles Farmer Duvall, from South Carolina, to succeed Bishop Murray. The new bishop was ordained on April 11, 1981, in the Field House of the University of West Florida in Pensacola before 2,500 people who had gathered to witness and celebrate the consecration.

From Bishop Duvall’s ordination in 1981, the Diocese grew steadily. In 1981, for example, the Diocese counted 57 churches including 25 parishes. Twenty years later when Bishop Duvall retired, the Diocese had grown to 38 parishes and 25 missions. In addition to being an owning diocese of the University of the South in Sewanee, Tennessee, the Diocese owns and supports three other institutions for ministry: Beckwith Camp & Conference Center, near Fairhope, Alabama; Wilmer Hall Children’s Home, and Murray House Assisted Living Facility, the latter two located in Mobile. Diocesan budgets reflect that growth, increasing from $229,370 in 1981 ($668,370 in 2021 money) to $1,992,114 in 2001 ($2,981,159 in 2021 money). Several major programs were launched during Bishop Duvall’s tenure, including a Companion Diocese relationship with Guatemala and an annual medical mission to Guatemala; the "Kairos" prison ministry; and "Happening" for young people. Meanwhile, the Cursillo program that began under Bishop Murray continued to thrive. To improve access for the far-flung parishes of the Central Gulf Coast and enable the Bishop and his staff to better serve the people, the diocesan offices were relocated to downtown Pensacola in 1989. During Duvall’s episcopate, two successful fund drives raised money to enhance the capability of the Diocese to serve the people of southern Alabama and northwestern Florida. The first, "Venture in Mission," launched in 1983, raised $1.5 million ($3,989,111 in 2021 money), part of which financed construction of the Chapel of the Resurrection at Beckwith Camp & Conference Center. The second, "Fulfilling the Vision," initiated in 1994, raised more than $2.5 million (at least $4,468,235 in 2021 money) including $1 million ($1,787,294 in 2021 money) for a conference building and a new motel-type building at Beckwith; $1,025,000 ($1,831,977 in 2021 money) for new church development; and $325,000 ($580,871 in 2021 money) set aside for continuing education in a "Vocations in Ministry" fund for continuing education for both clergy and laypeople.

On September 30, 1999, Bishop Duvall called for the election of a successor bishop. After a year-long search process, meeting at St. Stephen’s Church in Brewton, Alabama, on January 6, 2001, a special convention of the Diocese elected the Very Rev. Philip Menzie Duncan, II, dean of St. Matthew’s Cathedral in Dallas, Texas, to succeed Bishop Duvall. The new bishop was ordained on May 12, 2001, at the Pensacola Civic Center, witnessed by a congregation of over 2,500 people.

In 2015, Russell Kendrick, a native of the diocese whose first appointment as priest had been in the diocese itself, was elected as the fourth bishop, succeeding the retiring Duncan.

== The Seal of the Diocese of the Central Gulf Coast ==

To represent the Gulf Coast itself, an anchor, representing "hope" which played a large part in theformation of the new diocese, was placed against a background of water which consists of seven wavy bars alternating gold and blue. To raise the Christian symbolism to a more confident degree than merely that of hope, the dove of peace transcends below a bishop’s miter between two St. Andrew’s crosses and directly above the anchor as the "unifying chief" which will continue its reign over the anchor. With the diocese extending into the lower portion of Alabama and the upper portion of Florida, two St. Andrew’s crosses were used to represent the heritage of Alabama and Florida, both of which have the St. Andrew’s cross as a predominant symbol on their state flags. Also, with the cross of St. Andrew being a Christian symbol, it makes a unique attribute of representing at once the Church and the two states. Since the diocese was formed from two older areas, the new union was symbolized by placing the two crosses of St. Andrew side by side in a single field, the "chief" of the shield. The shield was designed by Professor James Waring McCardy of the University of the South, Sewanee, who is recognized as a top authority on ecclesiastical heraldry in America.

== List of bishops ==
Bishops of the Central Gulf Coast
From	Until	Incumbent	Notes
1970	1981	George M. Murray	George Mosley Murray (born April 12, 1919, Baltimore, Maryland, died July 14, 2006, Fairhope, Alabama). Translated from Episcopal Diocese of Alabama.
1981	2001	Charles F. Duvall	Charles Farmer Duvall (born November 18, 1935, Cheraw, SC, died October 8, 2020, Columbia, South Carolina).
2001	2015	Philip M. Duncan II	Philip Menzie Duncan II (born December 6, 1944, Glen Cove, New York; retired).
2015	Present	James Russell Kendrick	James Russell Kendrick (born August 8, 1961, Fort Walton Beach, Florida).

== See also ==
- Anglican Communion
- Dioceses of the Episcopal Church in the United States of America
- List of Succession of Bishops for the Episcopal Church, USA
