= William Paul Barnds =

American Episcopal bishop (1904–1973)

The Right Reverend William Paul Barnds
- Suffragan Bishop of Dallas
- Church: Episcopal Church
- Diocese: Dallas
- Elected: June 9, 1966
- In office: 1966–1973
- Predecessor: Joseph Harte
- Successor: Robert E. Terwilliger

Orders
- Ordination: January 18, 1933 by Robert Nelson Spencer
- Consecration: December 4, 1966 by John E. Hines

Personal details
- Born: August 5, 1904 Sweet Springs, Missouri, United States
- Died: January 23, 1973 (aged 68) Fort Worth, Texas, United States
- Buried: Slater City Cemetery, Slater, Missouri
- Denomination: Anglican
- Parents: William Tyson Barnds, Virginia Florida Larsen
- Spouse: Ida Lou Sterreit (m. 1930)
- Children: 3

William Paul Barnds (August 5, 1904 – January 23, 1973) was a suffragan bishop of the Episcopal Diocese of Dallas, serving from 1966 to 1973.

== Early life and education ==
Barnds was born in Sweet Springs, Missouri, on August 5, 1904, the son of William Tyson Barnds and Virginia Florida Larsen. He earned a Bachelor of Arts from the Missouri Valley College in 1925, which also awarded him an honorary Doctor of Divinity in 1947. He also graduated with a Masters of Arts in 1927 from the University of Missouri and a Doctor of Philosophy from the University of Nebraska in 1949. He trained for the ordained ministry at the University of Chicago from where he graduated with a Bachelor of Divinity in 1940 and then a Master of Sacred Theology from Seabury-Western Theological Seminary in 1944. Seabury awarded him with an honorary Doctor of Sacred Theology in 1944. Barnds married Ida Lou Sterreit on June 30, 1930, and together they had three children.

== Ordained ministry ==
Barnds was ordained deacon on July 15, 1932, and priest on January 18, 1933, by Bishop Robert Nelson Spencer of West Missouri. He initially served as a lay rector and then deacon in charge of All Saints' Church in Nevada, Missouri, between 1931 and 1933, after which he became its rector until 1935. He transferred to Independence, Kansas, to become rector of Epiphany Church, where he remained until 1944. He was also simultaneously priest-in-charge of Ascension Church in Neodesha, Kansas, between 1937 and 1944 and chairman of the Department of Christian Education in the Diocese of Kansas between 1939 and 1944. He became rector of St James' Church in South Bend, Indiana, while in 1956 rector of Trinity Church in Fort Worth, Texas, where he served until his election to the episcopate.

== Bishop ==
On June 9, 1966, Barnds was elected Suffragan Bishop of Dallas and was consecrated on September 15, 1966, in St Matthew's Cathedral, with Presiding Bishop John E. Hines as principal consecrator. Barnds died in office on January 23, 1973. He was buried at Slater City Cemetery in Slater, Missouri.
