= Christ Church Cathedral (Mobile, Alabama) =

Coordinates: 30.68941°N 88.04040°W

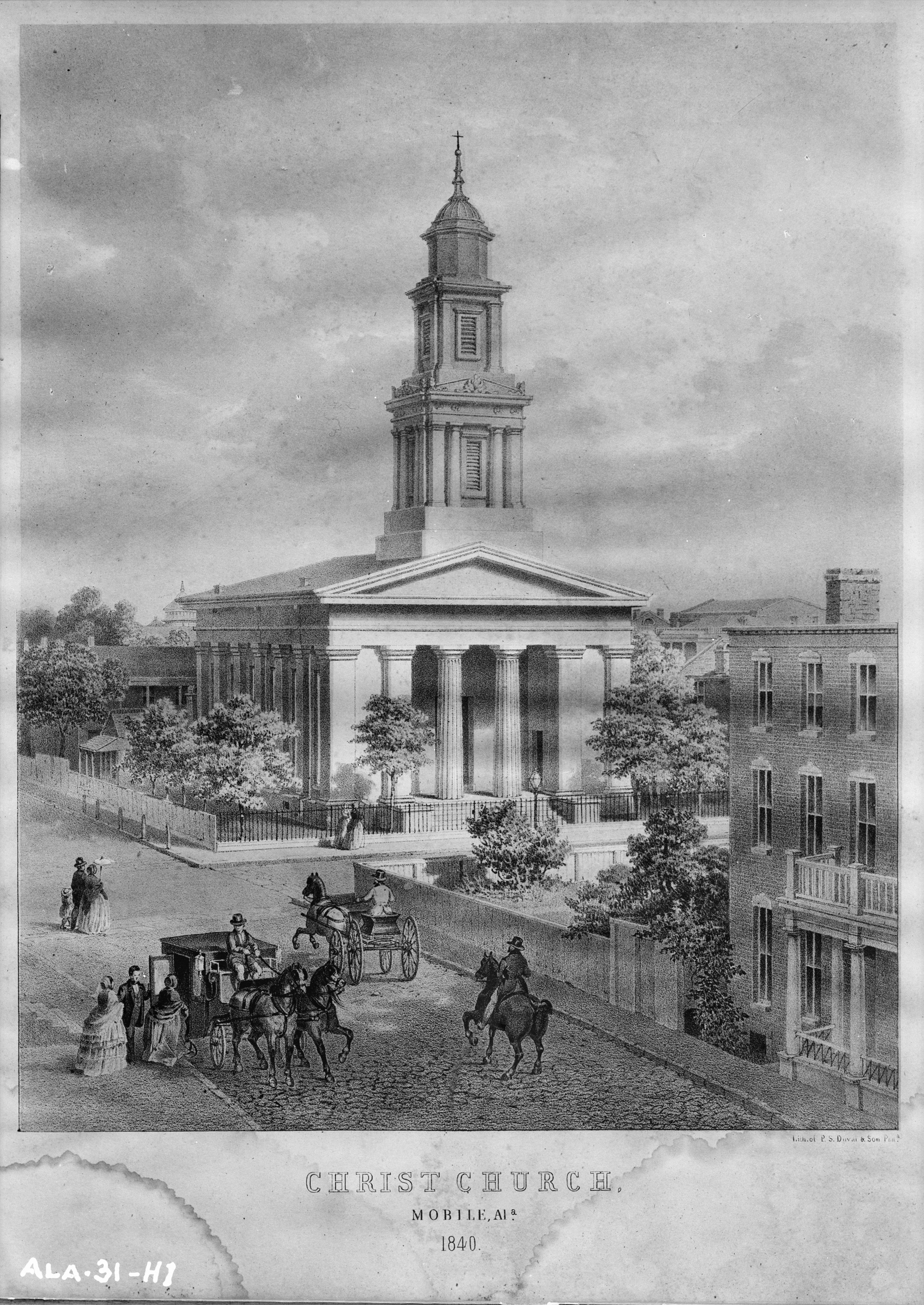
- Antebellum engraving of Christ Church
- Christ Church Cathedral
- Location: 115 South Conception Street; Mobile, Alabama, Alabama; United States
- Denomination: Episcopal Church
- Website: Christ Church Cathedral

History
- Founded: 1823
- Dedicated: 1842

Architecture
- Style: Greek Revival
- Years built: 1840

Administration
- Diocese: Central Gulf Coast

Christ Church Cathedral, also known simply as Christ Church, is a historic Episcopal cathedral located in Mobile, Alabama, USA.

== History ==
Christ Church Cathedral was established in 1823 as the first Episcopal congregation in Mobile, Alabama and the first in the State of Alabama. The first Anglican church services had been conducted at Fort Charlotte during the British occupation of Mobile. The cornerstone of the current Greek Revival building was laid in 1838, with construction being completed in 1840. The building is stucco over brick with stone accents.

In 1906 a major hurricane swept through the Mobile area and the storm crashed the original steeple through the roof, destroying both in the process. After repairs were completed the steeple was not replaced, and the church assumed its modern appearance. A new steeple was installed in April, 2017. The interior, which had to be rebuilt following the 1906 disaster, features stained glass windows by Franz Mayer & Co. and Tiffany Studios.

The church became the cathedral of the Episcopal Diocese of the Central Gulf Coast in 2005. Some years beforehand, a theologically conservative rector, his staff, and 90% of the church's communicants withdrew Christ Church from the U.S. Episcopal denomination and aligned with a body associated with the Anglican realignment movement. However, the Episcopal members retained the property in a legal settlement and reestablished the church, and the previous clergy and disaffected parishioners departed, with the parish rebuilding enough to the point that the Diocese chose it as the seat for its bishop, something it lacked for its first 35 years of existence. During Christ Church's days of belonging to the Diocese of Alabama, Alabama did not have a cathedral, and would not until 1982.

== See also ==
- List of the Episcopal cathedrals of the United States
- List of cathedrals in the United States
