= Robert E. Terwilliger =

The Right Reverend Robert E. Terwilliger
- Suffragan Bishop of Dallas
- Church: Episcopal Church
- Diocese: Dallas
- Elected: 1975
- In office: 1975–1986
- Predecessor: Theodore H. McCrea; William Paul Barnds
- Successor: D. Bruce MacPherson

Orders
- Ordination: June 29, 1943 by William Appleton Lawrence
- Consecration: December 29, 1975 by John Allin

Personal details
- Born: August 28, 1917 Cortland, New York, United States
- Died: June 3, 1991 (aged 73) Hurst, Texas, United States
- Buried: Bishop Mason Mausoleum and Columbarium, Flower Mound, Texas
- Denomination: Anglican
- Parents: Melville Terwilliger, Ella May Seman
- Spouse: Viola Mae (m. 1942; died 1984)
- Children: 1

Robert Elwin Terwilliger (August 28, 1917 – June 3, 1991) was a suffragan bishop of the Episcopal Diocese of Dallas.

== Life and career ==
He was ordained to the diaconate on December 7, 1942, and to the priesthood on June 29, 1943. He founded Trinity Institute at Trinity Church, Wall Street. He earned his B.A. degree in philosophy from Syracuse and the Bachelor of Divinity degree from the Episcopal Theological School in Cambridge, MA. Terwilliger was awarded the PhD by Yale University in 1948, writing on the ecclesiology of F.D. Maurice. At Yale he came under the influence of the moral theologian H. Richard Niebuhr.

The son of a Methodist minister in Upstate New York, Terwilliger believed in the value of good preaching and was himself an impressive preacher. He seldom used notes but his sermons came off his tongue as finely wrought, literary utterances. He could lecture or preach without notes for forty-five minutes to an hour.

Terwilliger served as rector of Christ Church, Poughkeepsie, for eleven years. During these years he was also a very effective Chaplain to Episcopal students at Vassar College. In 1960, he was called to St. James Church, Los Angeles, where his progressive view of race relations created serious tension with members of his congregation. He soon resigned St. James and moved back to New York, where, until he was elected Bishop Suffragan of Dallas in 1974 (consecrated in 1975), he served as a parish priest and a much-respected theologian and Christian intellectual.

The Trinity Institute was founded in 1967 with a grant from Trinity Church, Wall Street. It was a great success. Terwilliger's objective was to get Episcopalians together in a great city in order to form friendships while gaining exposure to the best religious voices in the world. The idea for the institute was hatched at a French restaurant on the Lower East Side, when A.M. Allchin of Pusey House, Oxford, and Terwilliger were having dinner. Both were keenly interested in the theology and religion of the Eastern Orthodox Churches and believed that Anglicanism and Orthodoxy have much in common. Michael Ramsey, Archbishop of Canterbury from 1961 to 1974, had appointed both Allchin and Terwilliger to the Anglican-Orthodox Dialogue.

In terms of society and politics, Terwilliger was very progressive in many of his views. He believed that women should have equal rights in the work-place and in society generally. However, he attracted the wrath of some Episcopalians for his continuing opposition to the ordination of women to the priesthood. His reasons for opposition were strictly theological and deeply conditioned by his commitment to the reunion of Christians, especially Anglicans and Eastern Orthodox. He emerged in the 1970s as one of the most articulate defenders of traditional practice and he vigorously opposed the ordination of women in the Episcopal Church.

== Bibliography ==
- The Doctrine of the Church in the Works of Frederick Denison Maurice (New Haven: Yale Ph.D. dissertation, 1948)
- Receiving the Word of God. New York: Morehouse-Barlow, 1960.
- Towards a Living Liturgy: The Liturgy of the Lord's Supper Examined in Essays. New York: Church of Saint Mary the Virgin, 1969.
  - "Liturgical Communication"
- (contributor) The Charismatic Christ: Addresses and Sermons Presented at the Third National Conference of Trinity Institute in January 1972 (New York: Morehouse-Barlow)
- Christian Believing. New York: Morehouse-Barlow, 1973.
- The Apostolic Ministry. New York: Committee for the Apostolic Ministry, 1973.
- Sexuality, Theology, Priesthood: Reflections on the Ordination of Women to the Priesthood. San Gabriel, California: Concerned Fellow Episcopalians, 1973.
- To Be a Priest: Perspectives on Vocation and Ordination. New York: Seabury Press, 1975. (co-editor with Urban T. Holmes III)
- The Ordination of Men in Theological Perspective. Cincinnati, Ohio: Forward Movement Publications, 1975.
- Come Holy Spirit. New York: Morehouse-Barlow, 1976.
- A New Vocation (New York: Coalition for the Apostolic Ministry, 1976)
- (contributor) Man, Woman and Priesthood (London: SPCK, 1978)
