= History of Dallas (1856–1873) =

19th century - partial - history of Dallas, Texas (US)

The history of Dallas, Texas, United States, from 1856 to 1873 charts the period from the grant of the town's charter to the convergence of the railroads.

== Township ==
On 2 February 1856, Dallas was granted a town charter during the Regular session of the Sixth Texas Legislature. Samuel Pryor was elected the first mayor along with a Marshal, a treasurer-recorder, and six aldermen. By 1859, Dallas had its first barber shop and a photographer. By 1860, the town's population reached 678, including 97 African Americans as well as Belgians, French, Germans, and Swiss. By that year, the railroad was approaching from the south, and several stage lines were already passing through the city.

== Fire of 1860 ==
1860 was a very rough year for the city as it began to prepare for war. Public debates on the issue of secession were held and a volunteer militia was started. In July 1860, a fire broke out in the square, destroying most of the buildings in the business district of Dallas. Many residents assumed that slaves were behind it and two abolitionists were run out of town. Three African-American slaves were hanged, and all other slaves in Dallas were ordered to be whipped. By December of that year, most of the city had been rebuilt. The population was growing so quickly that housing was frequently in short supply.

== Civil War ==
In 1861, Dallas County voted 741–237 in favor of secession. On 8 June of that year, a state of war was declared, and citizens were very supportive of the effort. The town was decorated and parades were held, and there was no shortage of volunteers. Since Dallas was so far from the actual fighting, citizens gave money, flour, and other supplies to the Confederate cause. A munitions factory was also built in the city. When the Union Army began to approach Mississippi and Louisiana, the cotton that was typically shipped there was instead shipped to Dallas.

== Reconstruction ==
The Reconstruction period brought many challenges for Dallas. On 19 June 1865 (Juneteenth), Texan slaves were liberated. Many African Americans came to Dallas after the war because the city was still prosperous compared to many other Southern cities. Freedmen's towns were scattered throughout Dallas and many whites became fearful — the Ku Klux Klan first appeared in the city in 1868.

Many Southerners who had been hurt financially during the war came to Dallas to rebuild their fortunes. They couldn't maintain plantations anymore, but North Texas' farm land meant opportunity. Dallas continued to grow during the Reconstruction years, unlike many Southern towns that still had the task of major rebuilding at hand. By this time, Dallas had also become the center of the buffalo market. In 1871, Dallas legally became a city.

Politics during the Reconstruction proved to be quite difficult. During the first elections, the voter registration board only allowed supporters of African American suffrage to vote. In 1872, Edmund J. Davis, then governor of Texas, ordered Henry Ervay, then mayor of Dallas, to be removed from office. He refused and was jailed. The state supreme court ruled that the governor did not have the power to remove officials from office, and Ervay was released.

== Railroad convergence ==
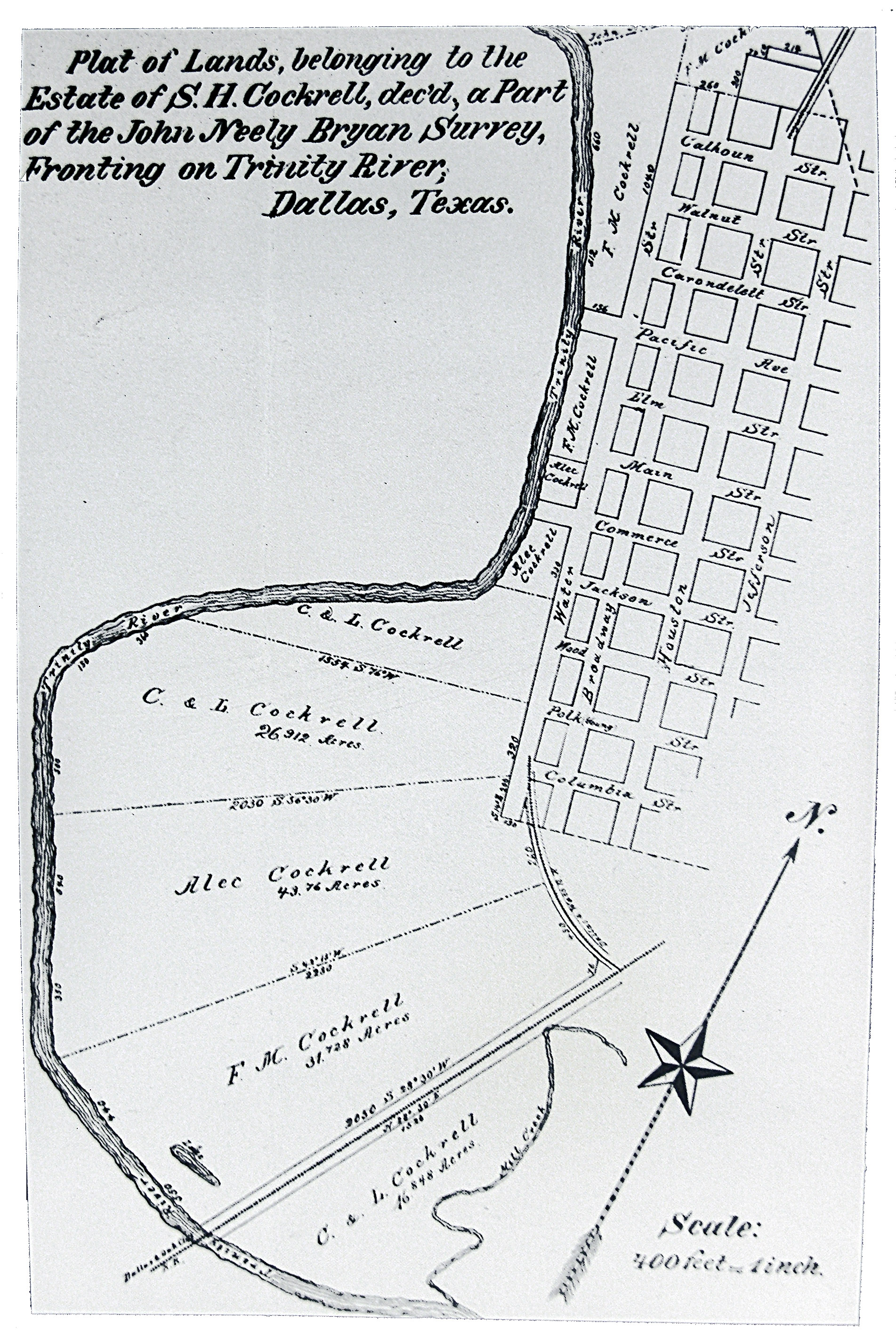
Map of central Dallas c. 1871

In 1871, railroads were beginning to approach the area and Dallas city leaders did not intend to stand idly and be left out. They paid the Houston and Central Texas Railroad US$5,000 to shift its route 20 miles (32 km) to the west and build its north–south tracks through Dallas, rather than through Corsicana as planned. A year later, Dallas leaders could not pay the Texas and Pacific Railway to locate there, so they devised a way to trick the Railroad—Dallas had a rider attached to a state law which required the railroad to build its tracks through Browder Springs—which turned out to be just south of Main Street. The major north–south and east-west Texas railroad routes intersected in Dallas in 1873, thus ensuring its future as a commercial center.

The arrival of the trains also meant soaring populations — the population of Dallas shot from 3,000 in early 1872 to more than 7,000 in September of the same year. New buildings and new businesses appeared daily. Telegraph lines came to Dallas, connecting it with the rest of the world. Dallas became the center of the markets for raw materials like grains and cotton that was being shipped to the south and east. It was also the "last chance" for people traveling west to get supplies. Large, ornate hotels were constructed in the city but many buildings remained utilitarian and plain. Water and gas also became available, and in 1871, the first volunteer fire company, Dallas Hook and Ladder Company #1, was organized.
