= Alexander Charles Garrett =

19th and 20th-century Episcopal bishop and missionary

The Most Reverend Alexander Charles Garrett
- 14th Presiding Bishop of the Episcopal Church
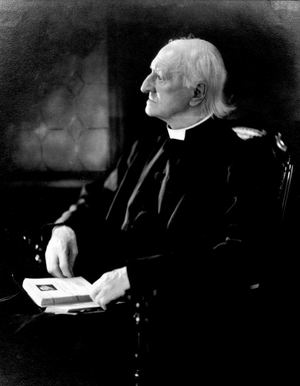
- Church: Episcopal Church
- In office: 1923–1924
- Predecessor: Daniel S. Tuttle
- Successor: Ethelbert Talbot
- Other post: Bishop of Dallas (1874-1924)

Orders
- Ordination: July 5, 1857 by Charles Sumner
- Consecration: December 20, 1874 by Robert Harper Clarkson

Personal details
- Born: November 4, 1832 Ballymote, County Sligo, Ireland
- Died: February 18, 1924 (aged 91) Dallas, Texas, United States
- Buried: Oakland Cemetery
- Denomination: Anglican
- Parents: John G. Garrett & Elizabeth Fry
- Spouse: Letitia Hope (m. 1854; died 1909)
- Children: 3
- Education: Trinity College, Dublin

Alexander Charles Garrett (November 4, 1832 — February 18, 1924) was a bishop of The Episcopal Church in the United States.

== Biography ==
Born in Ballymote, County Sligo, Ireland, he graduated from Trinity College, Dublin with a Bachelor of Arts in 1855. He was ordained deacon on July 6, 1856, and priest on July 5, 1857, in the chapel of Farnham Castle. He then served as curate of East Worldham, Hampshire in England, until 1859. In 1859 he left for British Columbia in Canada to serve as missionary, chaplain at the naval station at Esquimalt, rector of St Paul's Church in Nanaimo, and minister to the gold miners at Cariboo.

In 1870 he moved to the United States and became rector of St James's Church in San Francisco, and in 1872 Dean of Trinity Cathedral in Omaha. In 1874 he was appointed Missionary Bishop of Northern Texas and retained the seat after the formation of the Episcopal Diocese of Dallas on December 20, 1895. He was consecrated bishop on December 20, 1874, by Bishop Robert Harper Clarkson of Nebraska in Trinity Cathedral, Omaha. he was instrumental in the building of St Matthew's Cathedral in Dallas, Texas. He also founded St. Mary's College for women in Dallas.

On the death of Daniel Sylvester Tuttle on April 17, 1923, Garrett became presiding bishop. At that time he was 91 years old and totally blind. He remained Bishop of Dallas and Presiding Bishop until his death in 1924.

== Bibliography ==
Garrett wrote:

- A Charge to the Clergy and Laity of North Texas (1875)
- Historical Continuity (1875)
- Baldwin Lectures on the Philosophy of the Incarnation

Episcopal Church (USA) titles
Preceded by Daniel Sylvester Tuttle	14th Presiding Bishop; 1923–1924	Succeeded by Ethelbert Talbot
Preceded by New Diocese	1st Bishop of Dallas; 1895–1924	Succeeded by Harry Tunis Moore
