= Church of the Advent (Spartanburg, South Carolina) =

Historic church in South Carolina, United States

- U.S. National Register of Historic Places
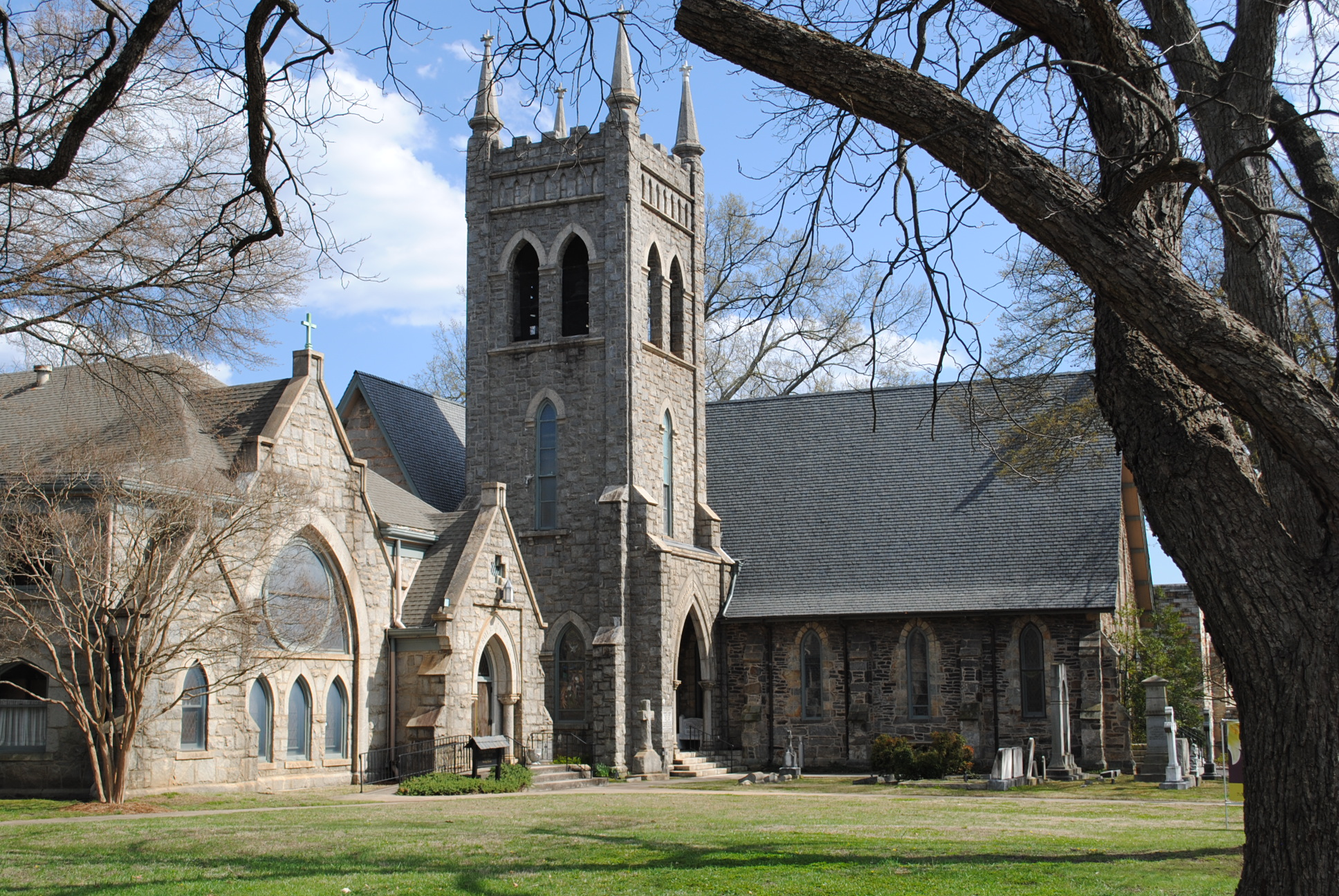
- Church of the Advent

- Location within South Carolina Location within the United States
- Location: 141 Advent St., Spartanburg, South Carolina
- Coordinates: 34°56′59″N 81°55′28″W
- Area: 2.7 acres (1.1 ha)
- Built: 1851
- Architect: McCollough, John DeWitt
- Architectural style: Gothic Revival, Late Gothic Revival
- NRHP reference No.: 00000553
- Added to NRHP: May 26, 2000

Episcopal Church of the Advent is a historic Episcopal church at 141 Advent Street in Spartanburg, South Carolina.

The Gothic Revival building was constructed in 1851 and added to the National Register of Historic Places in 2000.

The Church of Advent is significant both as the home of the first Episcopal congregation organized in Spartanburg County, and as an excellent example of a Gothic Revival sanctuary and church complex designed before the Civil War, with significant alterations and additions in the late nineteenth and early twentieth centuries. The sanctuary was designed in 1851 by the Reverend John DeWitt McCollough, rector at the Church of Advent 1850-1857 and 1859–1875, with later major alterations and additions designed by Silas McBee (1853-1954) and A. H. Ellwood and Sons in 1897. McCollough is also known to have designed a number of other churches in South Carolina. Major H.J. Dean's quarry supplied the granite for the church, and slaves or free blacks, including several skilled carpenters, performed much of the labor. The sanctuary was finally completed in early 1864; a bell tower was added in 1870. The sanctuary was enlarged in 1897 to its current cruciform plan. Pendleton Hall, built 1912-13 as an addition to the north side of the sanctuary and designed by A. H. Ellwood and Sons, served as the parish hall for many years. The Church of the Advent also sponsors Boy Scout Troop No.1, founded in 1914 by Dr. Pendleton as the first Boy Scout troop organized in South Carolina. The Boy Scout hut on the church grounds was built in 1927. The church cemetery surrounds the sanctuary. Many of its monuments are of notable artistic merit.
