= Episcopal Diocese of Dallas =

Diocese of The Episcopal Church (based in the United States)

Coordinates: 32.808°N 96.772°W

Diocese of Dallas Diœcesis Dallasensis

Location
- Country: United States
- Territory: Bowie; Camp; Cass; Collin; Cooke; Dallas; Delta; Denton; Ellis; Fannin; Franklin; Grayson; Hopkins; Hunt; Kaufman; Lamar; Morris; Navarro; Rains; Red River; Rockwall; Titus; Upshur; Van Zandt; Wood
- Ecclesiastical province: Province VII

Statistics
- Congregations: 61 (2024)
- Members: 27,113 (2023)

Information
- Denomination: The Episcopal Church
- Established: December 19, 1895
- Cathedral: Cathedral of St Matthew

Current leadership
- Bishop: Robert P. Price

Map
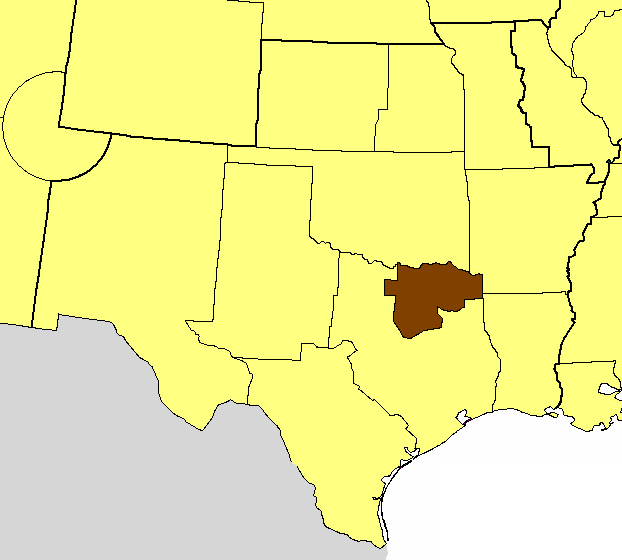
- Location of the Diocese of Dallas

Website
- edod.org

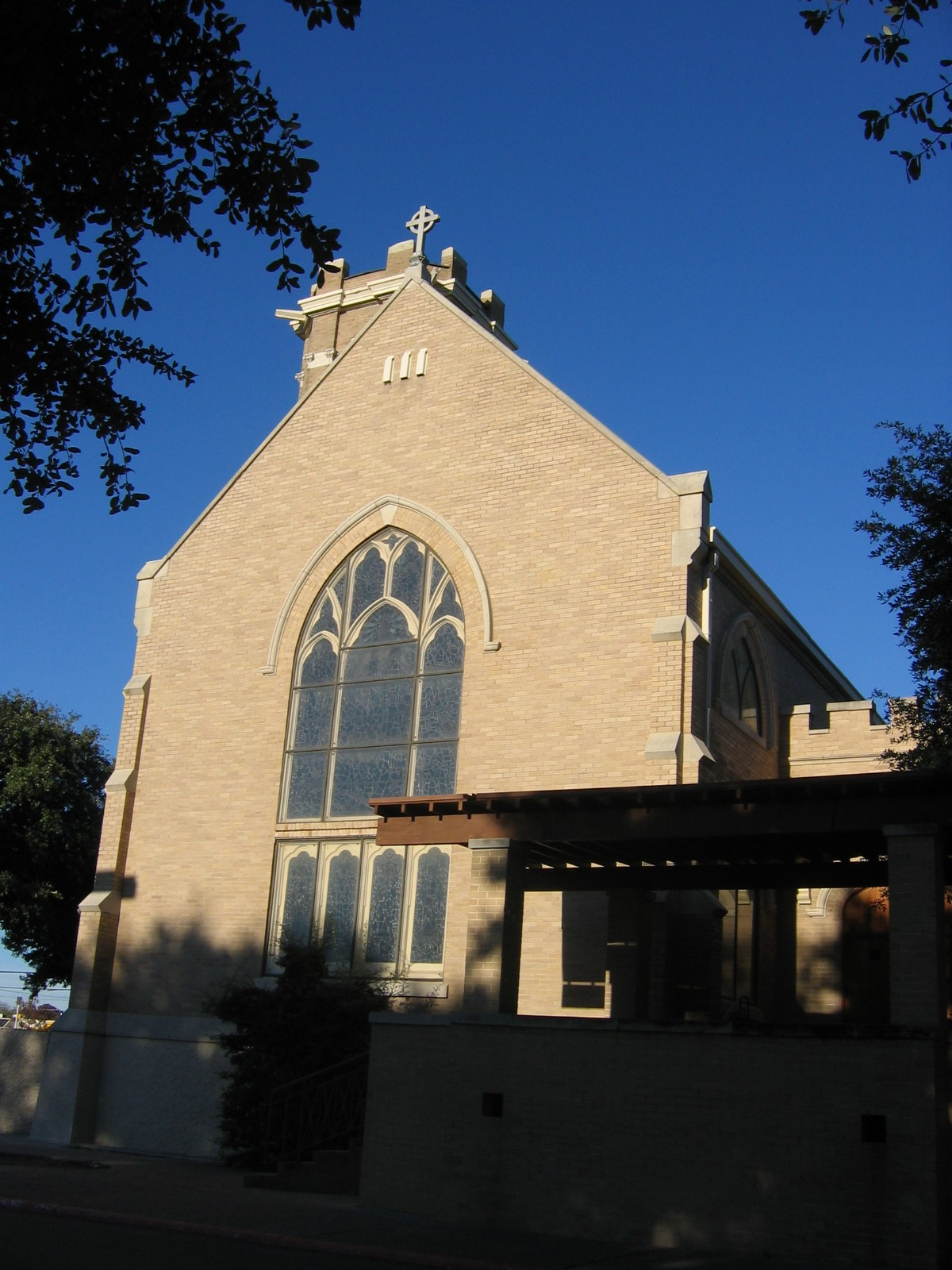
The Cathedral Church of Saint Matthew, next to the Diocesan House.

The Episcopal Diocese of Dallas is a diocese of The Episcopal Church (United States) which was formed on December 20, 1895, when the Missionary District of Northern Texas was granted diocesan status at the denomination's General Convention the preceding October. Alexander Charles Garrett, who had served as the first bishop of the Missionary District of Northern Texas, remained as bishop of the new diocese. The diocese began when thirteen parishes were merged.

The Missionary District of Northern Texas was formed when a portion of the Episcopal Diocese of Texas was divided on February 2, 1875. Garrett named the oldest church in the district, which was Saint Matthew's Episcopal Church, as his cathedral church and Dallas as his see. Saint Matthew's has remained the cathedral church of the bishop since that time. Garrett served until his death in 1924.

There are more than seventy parishes and schools in the diocese. The diocese is involved in many national and international missionary outreach programs. The principal offices of the diocese are at the Diocesan House, which is, along with the cathedral church, located on the former site of Saint Mary's Episcopal College for Women. The diocese divided in 1983, the Episcopal Diocese of Fort Worth was formed from the division.

== Statistics ==
Public membership figures cited a decline in membership from 31,729 in 2015 to 27,113 in 2023. No membership statistics were reported in 2024 national parochial reports. Average Sunday Attendance (ASA) in the diocese was 10,656 in 2015 and 7,985 in 2024. The 61 reporting congregations of the diocese had $33,604,420 in plate and pledge income in 2024.

== Election of George R. Sumner as diocesan bishop ==
James M. Stanton announced in May 2013 that he would retire as the VI Bishop of Dallas, effective 31 May 2014. Following Stanton's retirement, Paul E. Lambert, elected on 29 March 2008 as bishop suffragan, served as bishop pro-tempore.

On May 16, 2015, the diocese held a "Special Convention for the Election of the VII Bishop of the Episcopal Diocese of Dallas". At this convention, George R. Sumner, then principal of Wycliffe College, Toronto, was duly elected to be seventh Episcopal Bishop of Dallas. Sumner was elected with 77 clergy votes out of 138 cast; and 107 lay votes out of 193. He was consecrated on November 14, 2015.

== Election of Robert P. Price as bishop coadjutor ==
On April 17, 2024, the Rt. Rev. Dr. George R. Sumner, MDiv, PhD, VII Bishop of the Diocese of Dallas, called for the election of a bishop coadjutor, who would serve as an assisting bishop until Bp. Sumner's retirement, whereupon the coadjutor would become the VIII Bishop of the Diocese of Dallas. The diocese therefore formed a search committee, the chair of which announced a slate of candidates on March 3, 2025.

On Saturday, May 3, 2025, clergy and lay delegates of the diocese held a Special Convention for the purpose of electing the bishop coadjutor at Saint Michael and All Angels Episcopal Church, Dallas, TX. On the second ballot, with 82 clergy votes of 130 cast and 77 lay votes of 148 cast, the convention duly elected the Very Rev. Dr. Robert Paul Price, MDiv, PhD, then serving as the Dean of the Cathedral Church of Saint Matthew in Dallas, to become the bishop coadjutor. Price was consecrated Bishop Coadjutor on Saturday, September 6, 2025, at Church of the Incarnation.

Upon the retirement of Bishop Sumner, Bishop Price became the eighth Bishop of the Diocese of Dallas on January 1, 2026.

== Influence of the Anglican realignment ==
The Diocese of Dallas is opposed to the ordination of gay clergy but has chosen to stay within The Episcopal Church. The Diocese of Dallas approved, at its 2006 diocesan convention, an amendment to the diocesan constitution that it would break with The Episcopal Church only if that body were no longer part of the worldwide Anglican Communion. A vast majority of the Diocese of Fort Worth, on the other hand, voted to break away from The Episcopal Church in 2008. Additionally, several conservative parishes, including Christ Church, Plano, purchased their properties from the Diocese of Dallas and are now aligned with Anglican bodies other than The Episcopal Church.

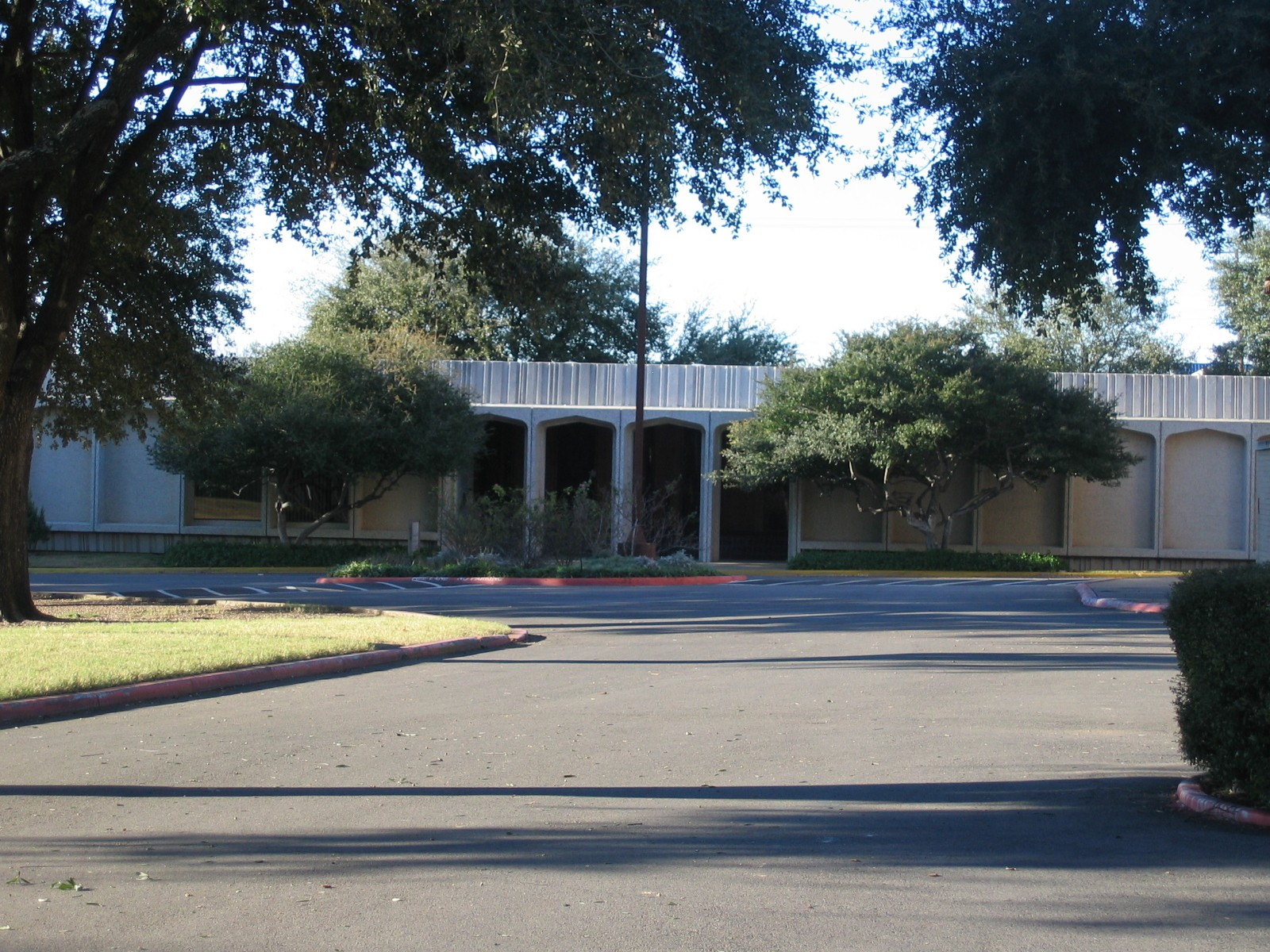
The Diocesan House of the Episcopal Diocese of Dallas, Texas.

== List of bishops ==
=== Missionary and diocesan bishops ===
Missionary Bishops of Northern Texas
From	Until	Incumbent	Notes
1874	1895	Alexander Charles Garrett	(1832, Ireland - February 18, 1924, Dallas TX); Became diocesan Bishop of Dallas.
Bishops of Dallas
From	Until	Incumbent	Notes
1895	1924	Alexander Charles Garrett	(1832, Ireland - February 18, 1924, Dallas TX); became Presiding Bishop of The Episcopal Church in 1923; died while holding both offices.
1924	1946	Harry Tunis Moore	(October 4, 1874, Delavan, WI – October 6, 1955); previously coadjutor since 1917.
1946	1970	C. Avery Mason	Charles Avery Mason (died early 1970); died in office; previously coadjutor since 1945.
1970	1983	A. Donald Davies	Translated to Fort Worth.
1983	1992	Donis D. Patterson	Donis Dean Patterson (April 27, 1930, Holmesville, OH – February 3, 2006, Orlando, FL)
1993	2014	James M. Stanton	James Monte Stanton (born October 29, 1946, Atchison, KS)
2015	2025	George R. Sumner	George Robinson Sumner, Jr. (born February 19, 1955)
2026		Robert P. Price	Robert Paul Price; previously coadjutor since 2025.

=== Suffragan and assistant bishops ===
Suffragan and assistant bishops
From	Until	Incumbent	Notes
1950	1954	Frank Burrill, suffragan bishop	
1954	1962	Joseph M. Harte, suffragan bishop	John Joseph Meakin Harte (July 28, 1914, Springfield, OH – December 19, 1999, Phoenix, AZ); became Bishop of Arizona.
1962	1975	Theodore H. McCrea, suffragan bishop	Theodore Harper McCrea (Mar. 27, 1908 - Sep. 22, 1986)
1966	1973	William Paul Barnds, suffragan bishop	(August 5, 1904, Sweet Springs, MO – January 23, 1973, Fort Worth, TX); died in office.
1976	1986	Robert Terwilliger, suffragan bishop	Robert Elwin Terwilliger (Aug 28 1917 - June 3, 1991, Hurst, TX, aged 73)
1999	2002	D. Bruce MacPherson, suffragan bishop	David Bruce MacPherson (born in Winnipeg, Manitoba, Canada); became Bishop of Western Louisiana.
2004	2007	Stephen H. Jecko, assistant bishop	Retired Bishop of Florida.
2008	2016	Paul E. Lambert, suffragan bishop	Paul Emil Lambert (born May 19, 1950, Reno, NV) retired May 2016

== Sources ==
- Wiles, C. Preston (2005). "History of the diocese". The Episcopal Diocese of Dallas. Archived from the original on 2008-12-25. Retrieved 2012-07-30.
- Dallas, Texas from the Handbook of Texas Online
