= Episcopal Missionary Church =

Anglican church body in the United States

- Classification: Protestant
- Orientation: Anglican
- Polity: Episcopal
- Presiding bishop: Peter Ng'ang'a
- Associations: ACNA
- Region: United States
- Founder: A. Donald Davies
- Origin: 1992
- Separated from: The Episcopal Church
- Congregations: 10
- Official website: www.emchome.org

The Episcopal Missionary Church (EMC) is a Continuing Anglican church body in the United States.

== History ==
The Episcopal Missionary Church (EMC) was founded in 1992 out of the Episcopal Synod of America (now Forward in Faith, North America), an Anglo-Catholic group also formed in 1992 as a reaction to the ordination of women as bishops in the Anglican Communion. A. Donald Davies, retired bishop of Fort Worth, Texas, served as its first presiding bishop and was succeeded by William W. Millsaps, former chaplain of the University of the South at Sewanee, Tennessee. Millsaps continues to be the Ordinary of the Diocese of the South, with John Greaves serving as Bishop Coadjutor and Christ Church, Monteagle, Tennessee, serving as the cathedral for the diocese. Peter Ng'ang'a became Presiding Bishop of the EMC in 2024 and is the Ordinary of the Diocese of the West, and Wale Fafiade is the Ordinary of the Diocese of the East.

The EMC acknowledges the Nicene and Apostles' Creeds as definitive statements of the Christian faith. They emphasize the necessity of the sacraments of baptism and Holy Communion and support the historic Episcopate as a means of maintaining apostolic succession. The EMC embraces a variety of liturgical styles from low church to high church, evangelical to Anglo-Catholic.

On 14 September 2020, the EMC endorsed a concordat of full communion with the Anglican Church in North America (ACNA), which was signed by then-Archbishop Foley Beach and EMC Presiding Bishop William Millsaps.
