= George R. Sumner =

American bishop

The Right Reverend George R. Sumner
- Bishop of Dallas
- Church: The Episcopal Church
- Province: Province VII
- Diocese: Dallas
- Elected: May 16, 2015
- In office: 2015–2025
- Predecessor: James M. Stanton
- Successor: Robert P. Price

Orders
- Ordination: 1981
- Consecration: November 14, 2015 by Michael Curry

Personal details
- Born: 1955 (age 70–71)
- Denomination: Anglican
- Spouse: Stephanie Alexandra Hodgkins
- Children: 2
- Motto: Simul Justus Et Peccator (At once righteous and a sinner)

George Robinson Sumner (born 1955) is a former bishop of the Episcopal Diocese of Dallas. He had served previously as principal of Wycliffe College, Toronto.

== Life and career ==
Sumner attended Harvard College from where he graduated with a Bachelor of Arts degree in Classics. He then earned a Master of Divinity degree from Yale Divinity School and a Doctor of Philosophy degree in theology from Yale University.

He was ordained deacon and priest in 1981 for the Diocese of Western Massachusetts, after which he became a tutor at St Philip's Theological College in Kongwa, Tanzania. In 1984 he returned to the United States and became curate of St Matthew's Church in Worcester, Massachusetts, and in 1986 vicar of the Southeast Region for Navajoland Area Mission. In 1991 he became a missioner of the Middlesex Cluster in the Diocese of Connecticut. Between 1994 and 1995, he was interim at the Church of the Nativity in Northborough, Massachusetts and assistant of the Assabet Cluster, until he became rector of Trinity Church, Geneva, New York in 1995.

In 1999, Sumner was named principal of Wycliffe College, Toronto, where he remained until his election as Bishop of Dallas on May 16, 2015. He was consecrated on November 14, 2015 in the First United Methodist Church of Dallas with Presiding Bishop Michael Curry as chief consecrator. Sumner retired as Bishop of Dallas on December 31, 2025, and was automatically succeeded by Bishop Coadjutor Robert P. Price.

== See also ==
- List of Episcopal bishops of the United States
- List of bishops of the Episcopal Church in the United States of America
