= Cathedral Church of Saint Matthew (Dallas) =

Historic church in Dallas, Texas, United States

St. Matthew's Cathedral
- The Cathedral Church of Saint Matthew
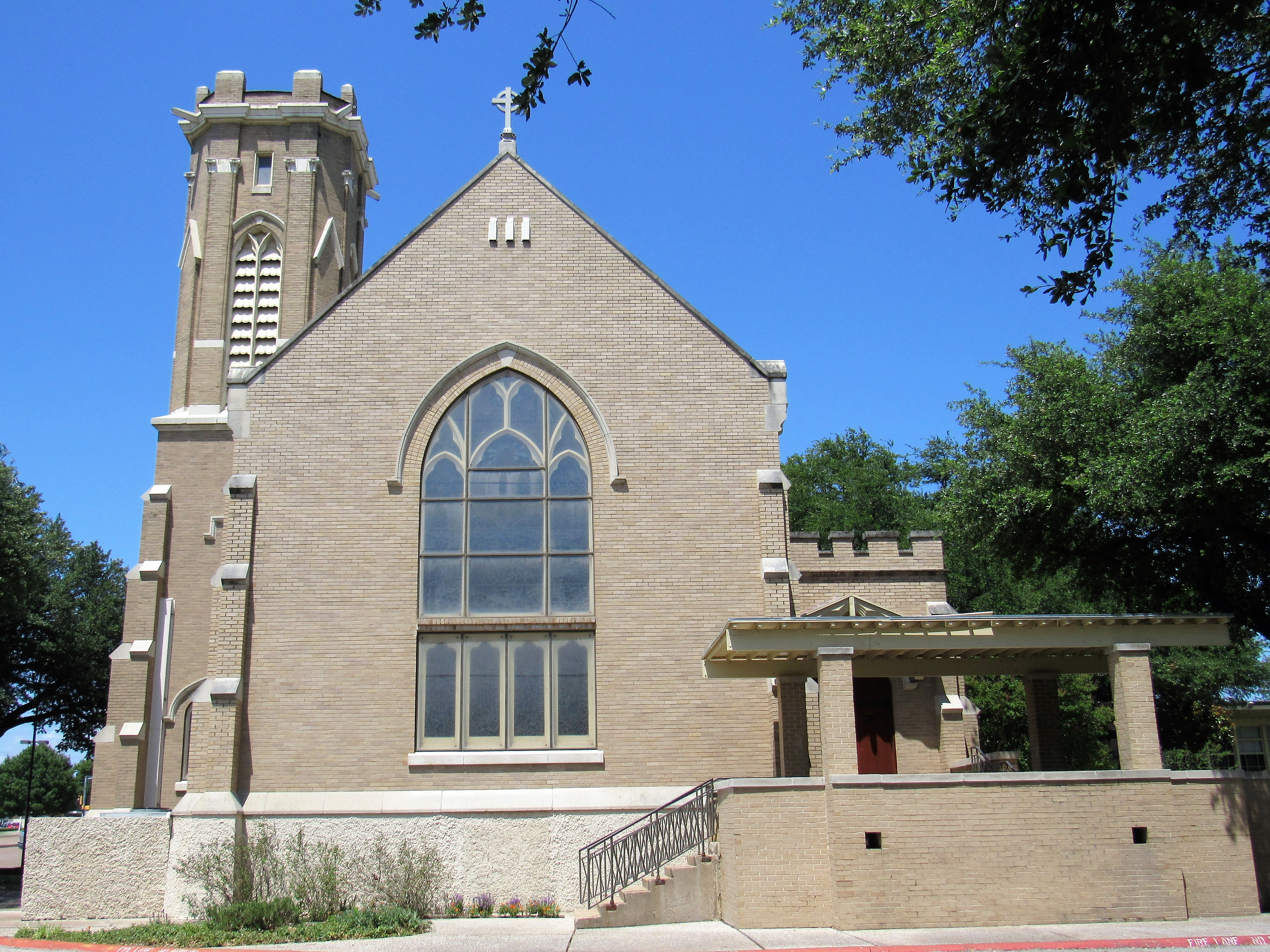

- Location within Texas
- 32°48′30.3″N 96°46′21.4″W
- Location: 5100 Ross Ave. Dallas, Texas
- Country: United States
- Denomination: The Episcopal Church
- Website: www.episcopalcathedral.org

History
- Founded: May 25, 1856
- Dedication: Saint Matthew

Architecture
- Style: Gothic Revival
- Completed: 1907, 1929

Administration
- Diocese: Dallas

Clergy
- Bishop: George R. Sumner
- Dean: Robert P. Price

The Cathedral Church of Saint Matthew, known simply as St. Matthew's Cathedral, is an Episcopal cathedral church located at 5100 Ross Avenue in Dallas, Texas, in the United States.

The cathedral is the official seat of the bishop of the Episcopal Diocese of Dallas and is sometimes called the mother church of the diocese. It is listed by the Texas Historical Commission as a historic landmark.

== History ==
St. Matthew's Church was the third church formed in the city of Dallas. The Reverend George Rottenstein officiated the first Episcopal church service in Dallas, May 25, 1856, on the second floor of a general store. At the time, Dallas was a town of about 400 people. The small congregation grew, and Rottenstein submitted articles of association to the Episcopal Church for the creation of the Episcopal Church of Saint Matthew to be effective September 21, 1857. The articles were ratified at the General Convention.

On July 8, 1860, a fire consumed most of the businesses on the town square as well as the rented facilities and all church belongings and records of Saint Matthew's. Pro-slavery conspiracy-theorists of the day attributed the fire to abolitionists, but scholars doubt the veracity of these claims. When the Right Rev. Alexander Gregg, first bishop of Texas, visited Dallas in October 1860, he found no church building, no records, and only six communicants. Bishop Gregg gave assistance to the small congregation so that the parish could continue.

The parish recovered and grew such that by 1870, the parish had enough funds for the construction of its own church. The church bell was added later that same year.

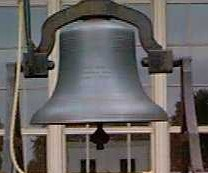
Great Matthew bell

As the city grew, it became necessary to move the church to another location. In 1877, the structure was put on heavy rollers pulled by oxen. However, the building collapsed. Parishioners, with the help of other citizens, carried the boards by hand to the new location and built a new church.

The Diocese of the Missionary District of Northern Texas was formed, led by the Right Reverend Alexander Garrett, and on February 2, 1875, Bishop Garrett named Dallas his see city and Saint Matthew's as his cathedral church. On December 20, 1895, the Diocese of the Missionary District of Northern Texas became the Diocese of Dallas.

In 1893, the congregation constructed a fine new stone cathedral on the corner of Elm and Lamar, but within a few years the growing industrious city encroached. Train tracks were laid nearby, and one of the railroads operated noisy steam engines that arrived at a nearby station at noon each Sunday. Smoke from the train would fill the church on any given Sunday.

At that same time, Saint Mary's Episcopal College for Women was facing substantial financial struggles as new schools opened in the city. The vestry chose to relocate the cathedral to the corner of Ross and Henderson and assume the debt of St. Mary's College. The cathedral moved into its current location in July 1929. The Wall Street crash of 1929 occurred in October, and the cathedral, like its parishioners and citizens of Dallas, suffered greatly.

== Present ==
The Cathedral Church of Saint Matthew remains at the Saint Mary's campus. The former chapel for the college was expanded and continues as the cathedral for the Diocese of Dallas. The tree-lined college campus is now the cathedral close, and the facilities house a collection of stained-glass windows dating from the late 19th century.

Shield of Saint Matthew's Cathedral

In addition, the cathedral houses a collection of Victorian era paintings, many of which were gifts to Saint Mary's Episcopal College for Women, and feature Saint Mary.

In October 2013, the Justus Sundermann Art Gallery opened which features exhibits of local artists.

The congregation is heavily involved in ministries and outreach to the surrounding community. The cathedral serves the homeless and other needy through the Food Pantry.

The Bishop Stanton Center for Ministry Formation trains candidates for ministry as deacons, bi-vocational priests in rural areas, youth ministers, cross-cultural formation, lay preachers, and general enrichment in lay theological formation. The cathedral has conducted mission trips to Peru in the past, encouraging Spanish speakers and English speakers to come together. Angel Tree also does charity: they provide Christmas gifts to children and elderly.

== Schools within the cathedral ==
The cathedral directs the Right Reverend James M. Stanton Center for Ministry Formation, whose primary mission is to serve people who feel called to the diaconate; both to aid them in their discernment process and to provide the necessary theological training for possible ordination as deacons. The Cathedral Center is a place where deacons-in-training can be part of a community, attend graduate-level classes, and experience spiritual growth. The school also trains bi-vocational priests to serve in rural areas, youth ministers, training in cross-cultural awareness, as well as a variety of lay licensing classes and general classes to allow lay people to study the Bible, theology, and church history at a deeper level than is usually available in a local church setting.

== Leadership ==
The cathedral is the seat of the Bishop of Dallas. The Rt. Rev. George Sumner was elected as the seventh bishop for the Diocese of Dallas during a special convention in May 2015. His consecration was on November 14, 2015. As bishop he oversees the administrative needs throughout the diocese and is chief pastor for more than 31,000 Episcopalians, 200 clergy and 100 congregations.

In 2018, the cathedral vestry called the Very Reverend Robert P. Price to be the new dean. Dean Price holds a bachelor's degree and a master's degree in history from Stanford University, and began a Ph.D. program in History at Yale University before answering a call to the ministry and entering Yale Divinity School, from which he holds a Master of Divinity degree.

The cathedral usually has several assisting priests and deacons, many of whom are canons of the cathedral.

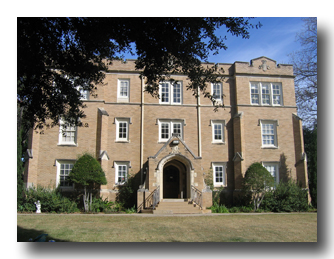
Garrett Memorial Hall from Saint Mary's Episcopal College for Women.

There are several groups and guilds headed by lay people.

There is a large guild of cathedral vergers whose primary responsibility is to assist with worship services. Vergers work with acolytes and altar guild to prepare the sanctuary for worship services and after services, they assist storing vestments and vessels in their proper places. The cathedral usually has one to three vergers at regular worship services. Vergers also assist with tours and special events at the cathedral. The cathedral provides facilities from time to time for the Vergers Guild of the Diocese of Dallas to conduct training, workshops, and retreats.

== Diversity ==
The cathedral is located in East Dallas and experiences all the challenges and opportunities of the inner city. The neighborhood continuously evolves. A large Hispanic community has grown in the area for the past several decades. In 1982, the cathedral began a worship service in Spanish. This congregation has grown to an average Sunday attendance of 25–300. In addition, developers are purchasing portions of land in the area and building expensive apartment and condominium complexes. The cathedral close is near downtown and is part of a transitional neighborhood located between two upscale neighborhoods that is home to first and second-generation immigrants, and a variety of transitional and homeless people. As a result, there is a great range of population characteristics evident in the congregation. The cathedral is known for its offerings to a wide range of people.

== Architecture ==
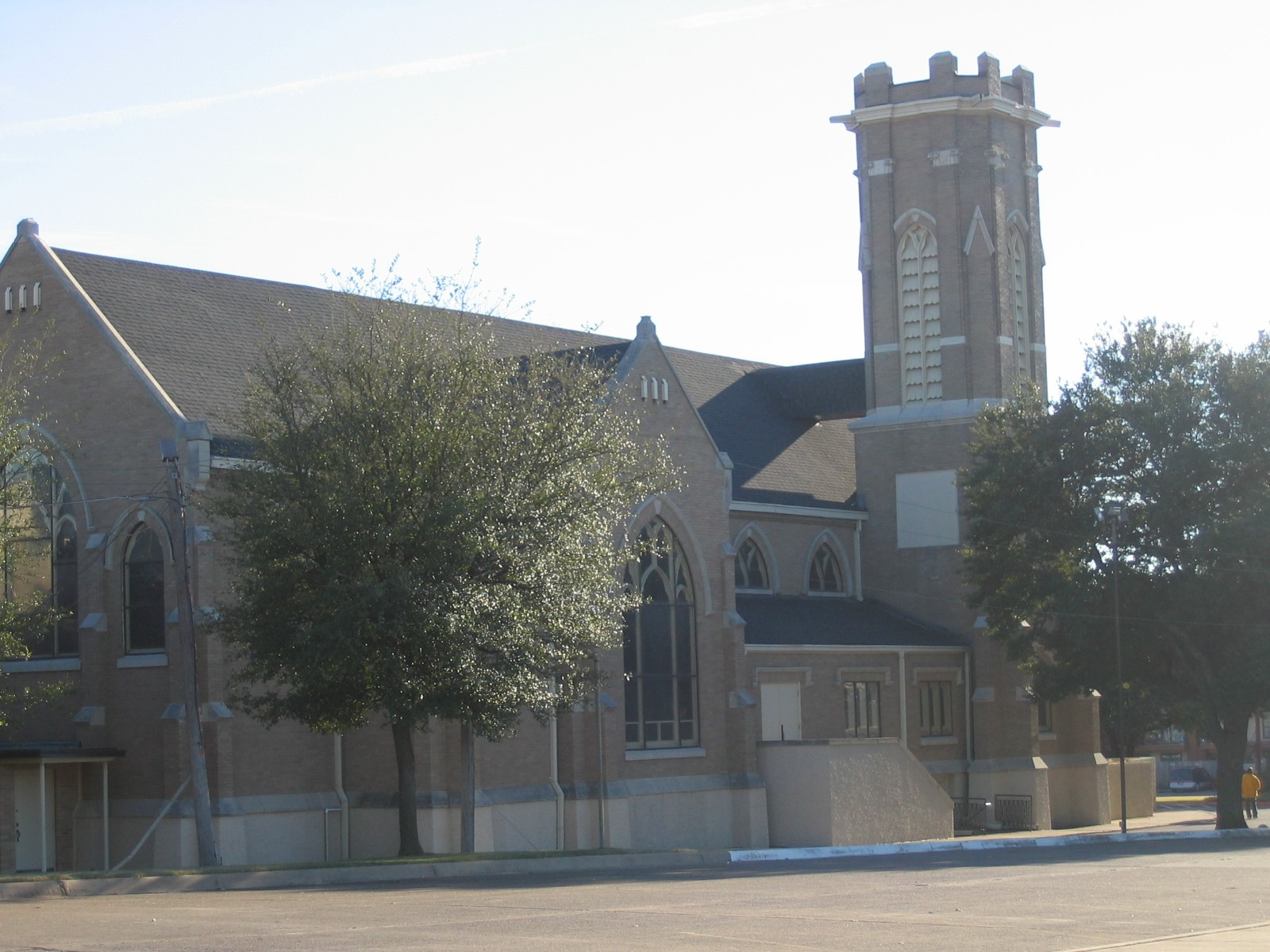
Southwest view showing the 1907 portion of the building

The church is constructed in the Gothic Revival. The college chapel, dating from 1907, was designed in the traditional shape of a Latin cross. In 1929, the chapel was enlarged to hold the large congregation of the cathedral, changing the proportions of the traditional cross configuration. Prior to the expansion, the bell tower was located at the northwest corner of the structure. Today, the tower occupies a site on the north façade. The interior of the three-story bell tower is very small with a ladder and openings that permit only a person of small stature to enter. Cornerstones, plaques, and stained-glass windows from the earlier locations of the cathedral are incorporated around the cathedral close.

The central stained-glass window of Saint Mary's Episcopal College for Women was the Nativity scene, and on each side of it are windows relating to patron saints of women. Rather than replace these windows with the cathedral's patron Saint Matthew, a stained-glass window of Saint Matthew was installed in the south transept. Many of the windows came from prior structures and were installed in the 1970s. Other windows depict the Resurrection, the Stations of the Cross, the sacraments, and the founding fathers of the church. Because of the church's location in Texas, some windows contain unusual images, such as cowboys, Native Americans, and a stagecoach.

The oratory and Great Hall are in the modern style, the oratory contains a columbarium.

The Great Hall, constructed in 1955, holds a large parish hall with stage and two industrial kitchens. When the cathedral moved to its present location, it brought the Great Matthew Bell that dates from 1870. It was recast to its present size of 1,500 lb (680 kg) in 1888. Because the bell tower could not hold the immense bell and it was placed on a bell-cot that incorporates an 1899-plaque marking the 25th anniversary of the cathedral. The cot is located adjacent to the Great Hall.

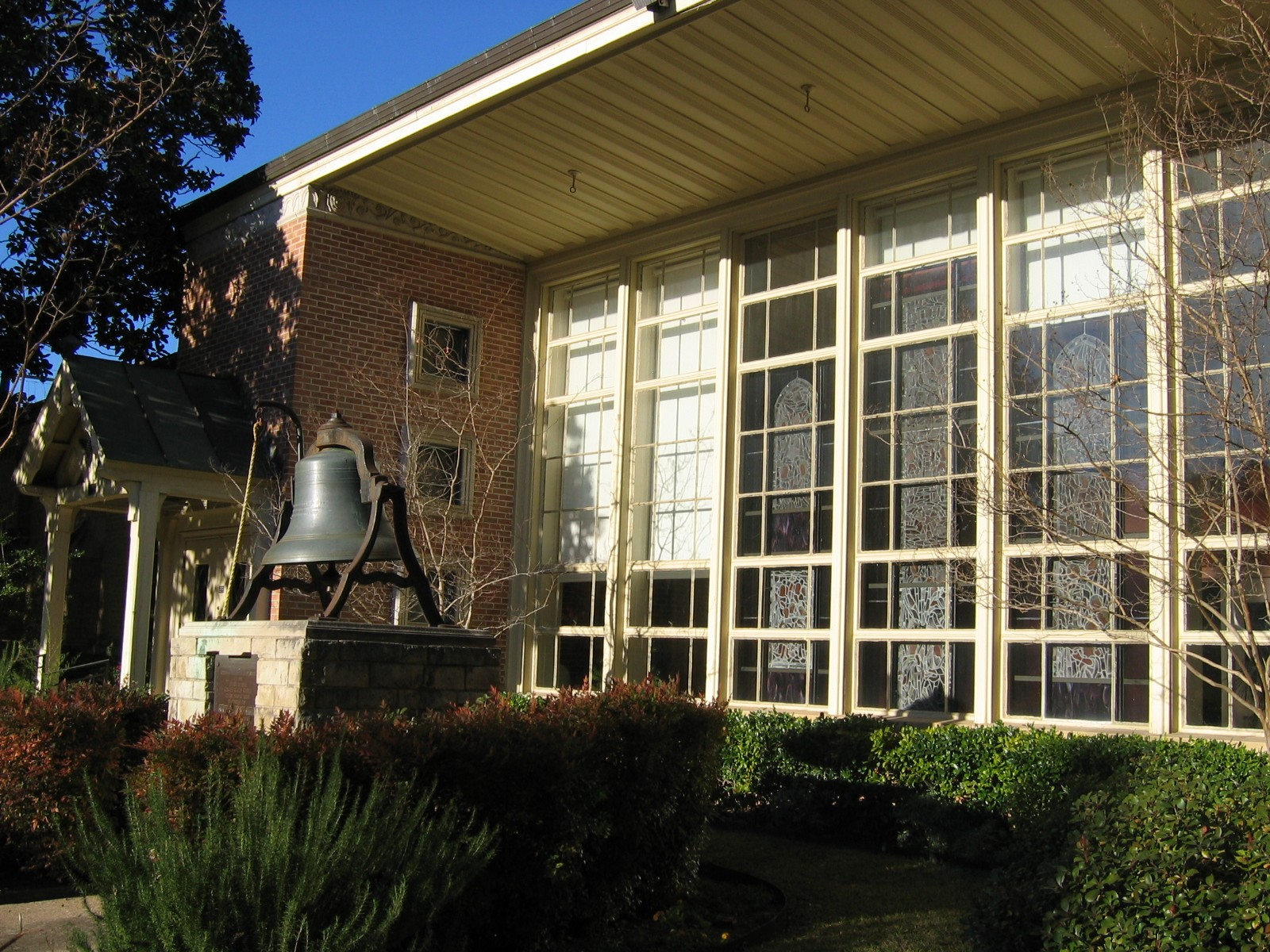
The Great Hall and Bell cot

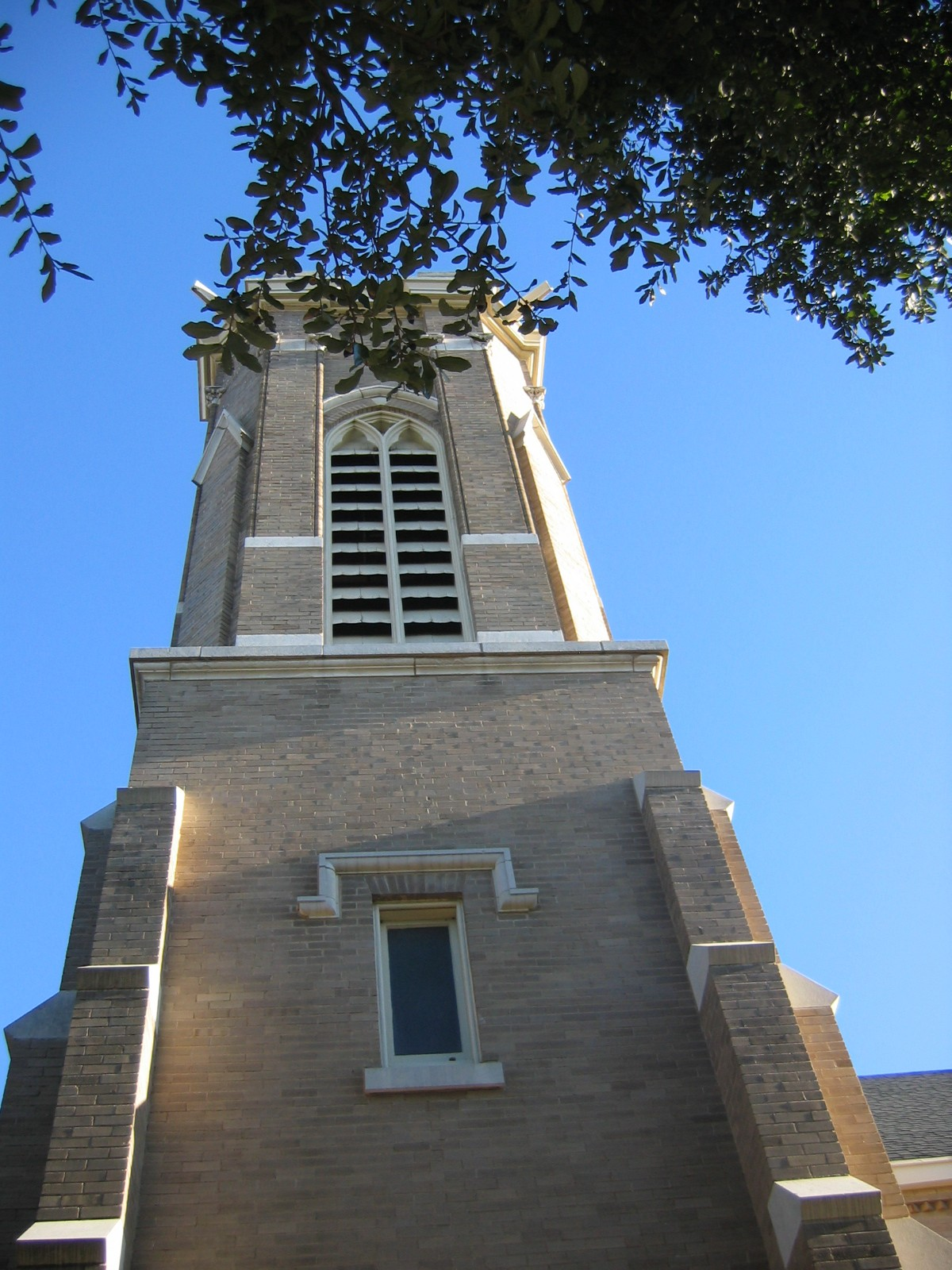
Close-up view of the tower.

The foyer of the Great Hall contains several stained-glass works, including a Tiffany window from the previous cathedral.

== See also ==
- List of the Episcopal cathedrals of the United States
- List of cathedrals in the United States

== Sources ==
Terwilliger Library & Archives at the Cathedral Church of Saint Matthew, Dallas, Texas.

- For information listed on the historical marker see the entry in the Texas Historic Sites Atlas of the Texas Historical Commission.
- For historical information on the City of Dallas, see The Handbook of Texas Online, Dallas.
- For historical information on the Episcopal Diocese of Dallas, see the Episcopal Diocese of Dallas website.
