= Casady =

Casady is a surname. Notable people with the surname include:

- Casady family of Iowa
- Bianca Leilani Casady, member of CocoRosie
- Guymon Casady (born 1969), American talent manager and producer
- Ian Casady (born 1980), American professional ballet dancer
- Jack Casady (born 1944), American bass guitarist
- Jefferson P. Casady (1823–1898), American politician
- Phineas M. Casady (1818–1908), American politician
- Robin Casady (died 2020), American businessman
- Samuel H. Casady (c. 1831–1873), American politician
- Sierra Rose Casady, member of CocoRosie
- Simon Casady (1852–1928), American banker
- Simon Casady (1908–1995), journalist and political figure
- Thomas Casady (1881–1958), bishop of Oklahoma
- Virginia Casady, American politician
