= Senator Casady =

Senator Casady may refer to:

- Jefferson P. Casady (1823–1892), Iowa State Senate
- Phineas M. Casady (1818–1908), Iowa State Senate

== See also ==
- Casady family
- Senator Cassidy (disambiguation)
