= Casady family =

Prominent family in Des Moines, Iowa

Casady
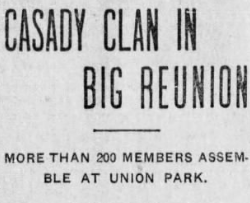
- "Casady Clan In Big Reunion", The Des Moines Register, 1905.
- Current region: America

The Casady family are a prominent family in the Des Moines region who were among the first white pioneers to arrive in Iowa. The family has been involved in banking, agriculture, education, real estate, politics, media, entertainment, and other endeavors, and had a strong impact on the early history and legislation of Iowa. Members of the Casady family have helped found several major businesses in Iowa history, including Pioneer Hi Bred International, Central National Bancshares, and the Bankers Life Association, which later evolved into Principal Financial Group. In the 1970s, the Casady family owned over 10% of all shares in the Pioneer corporation and nearly 14% of all stock in Central National Bancshares.

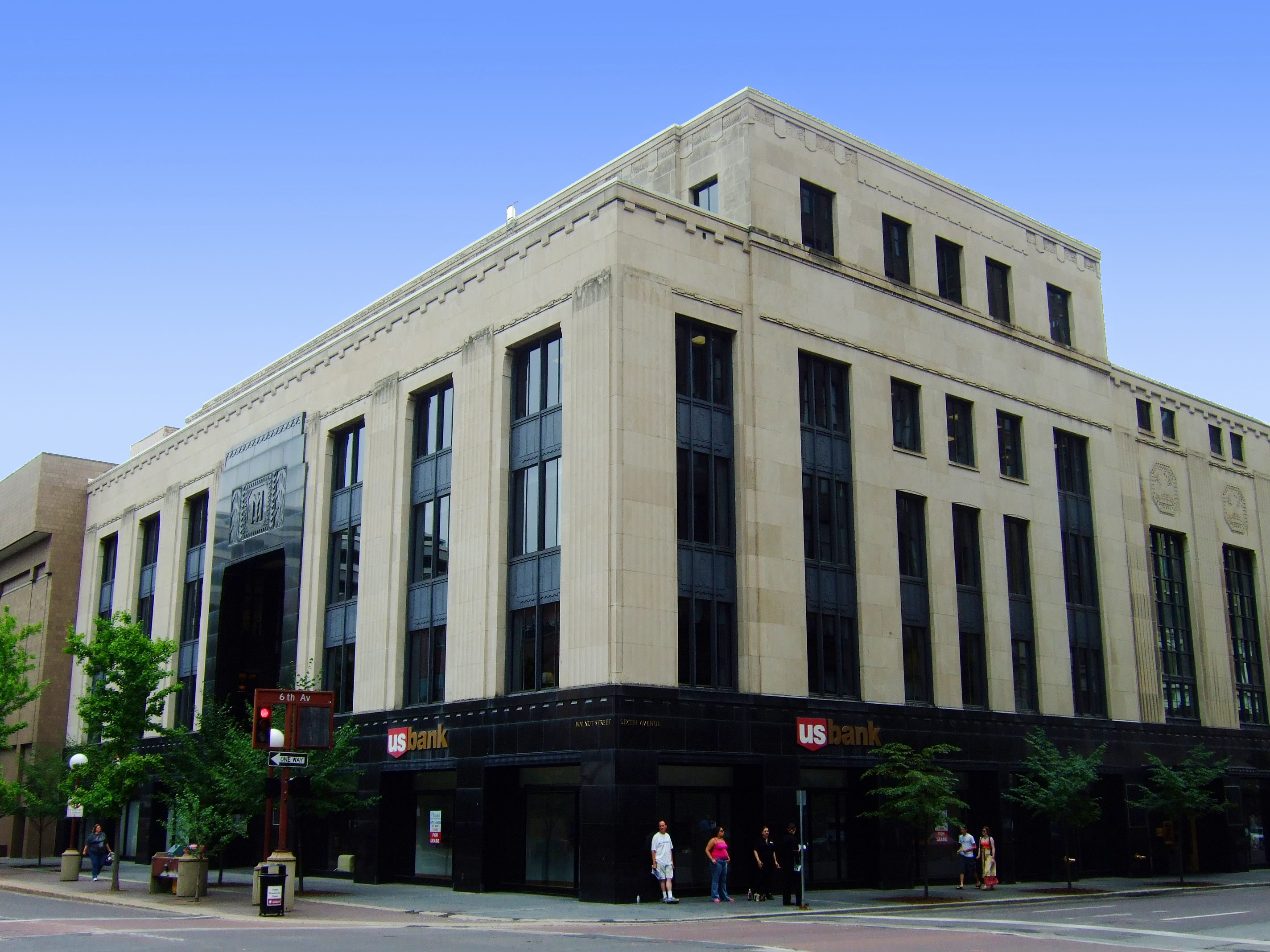
The Iowa-Des Moines National Bank Building purchased in 1909 by Simon Casady, photographed in June 2009.

== Background ==
As part of the founding elite of Des Moines, the Casady family maintained social ties with other affluent pioneer families such as the Hubbell family and the Polk family. Intermarriage was common between these families.

== Family tree ==
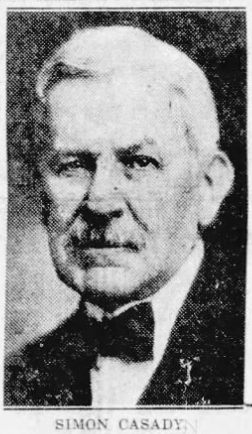
The banker Simon Casady, 1923.

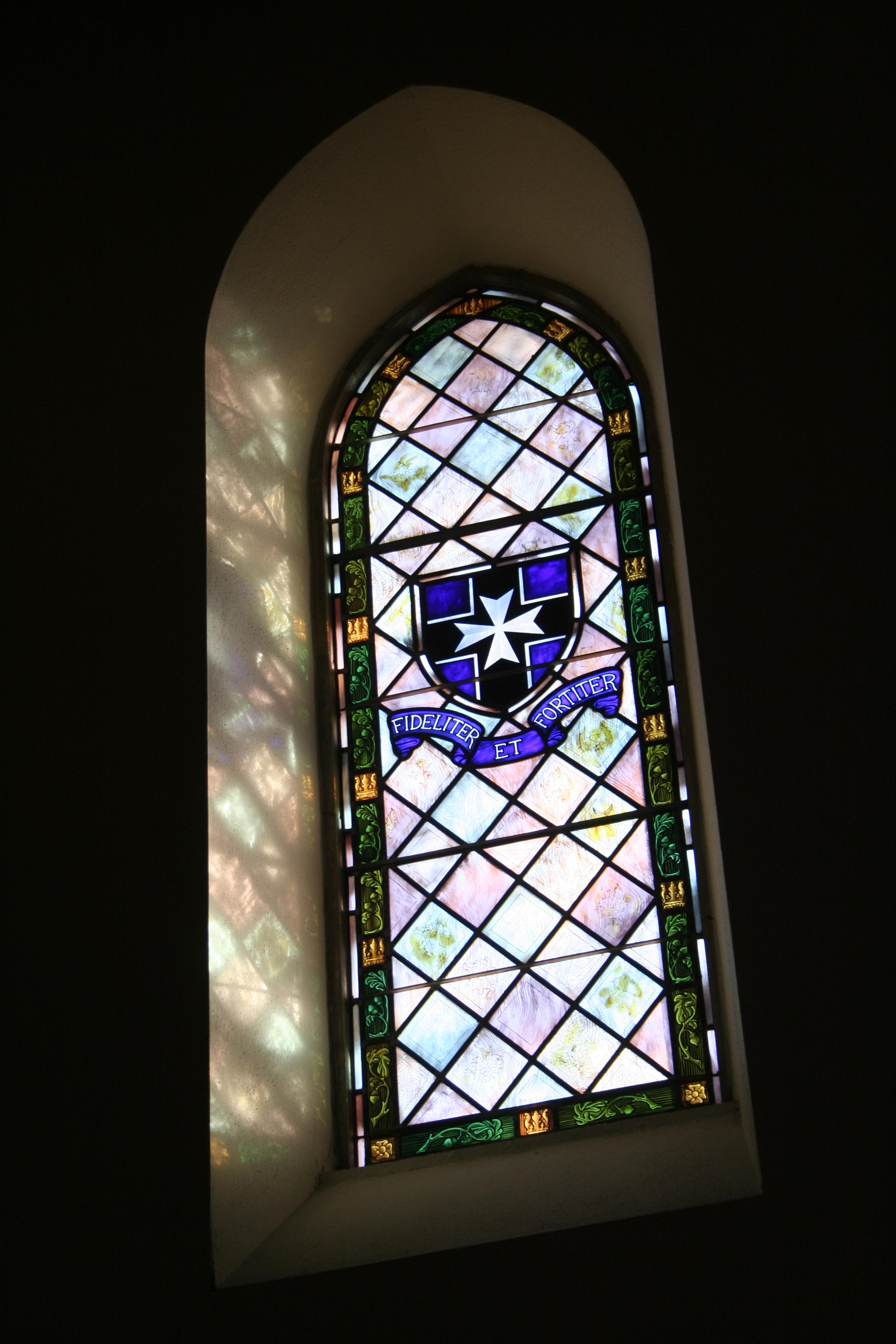
Chapel window at the Casady School in Oklahoma City, 2008.

- Simon Casady (1787-1866) m. Jemima McCray (1788-1822)
  - Jefferson P. Casady (1823-1892) m. Hannah Joiner (1839-1882)
  - Samuel H. Casady (1831-1873) m. Mary E. (1838-1907)
  - Phineas M. Casady (1818-1908) m. Wilhelmina Augusta Grimmell (1825-1914)
    - Simon Casady (1852-1928) m. Sarah Conarroe Griffiths (1855-1922)
      - Simon Casady, Jr. (1885-1931) m. Grace Margaret Wheeler (1888-1966)
        - Simon Wheeler Casady III (1915-2006) m. Gene Elisabeth Wilson (1923-2012)
          - Timothy Casady (b. 1951) m. Christina Chalmers (1949-2017)
            - Bianca Casady (b. 1982)
            - Sierra Casady (b. 1980)
      - Thomas Casady (1881-1958) m. Frances Lebaron Kasson (1883-1951)
        - Simon Casady (1908-1995) m. Virginia Kent Boone (1908-1987)
          - Kent Casady m. Janed Guymon
            - Guymon Casady (b. 1969)

== Agriculture ==
Simon Casady, Jr., son of banker Simon Casady, co-founded the Pioneer Hi Bred International corporation, a pioneer in the production of GMOs, alongside farm journal editor and future U.S. Vice President Henry A. Wallace and other local Iowa businesspeople.

Several generations of the Casady family were shareholders or officers at Pioneer, including Simon Casady Jr.'s son Simon Wheeler Casady III, who was a Pioneer director, secretary, and major shareholder. Simon Casady Jr.'s wife Grace Margaret Wheeler Casady was also a major shareholder. Simon and Grace's daughters Hortense Oldfather and Rose Casady McCay were also shareholders. In 1973, the Casady family owned over one million Pioneer shares, accounting for 10.9% of all shares.

== Banking ==
Simon Casady was a prominent banker in Iowa, known as the "dean of Iowa bankers". Casady's house on Prospect Boulevard in Des Moines was known as Rosebrae. Simon Casady and his brother Phineas M. Casady were founders of the Bankers Life Insurance Company in 1879, along with several other Des Moines businessmen Following the death of Simon Casady's mother Wilhelmina Augusta Grimmel in 1914, $400,000 of her estate was divided among her six grandchildren. Upon Simon Casady's death in 1928, his estate was worth an estimated $167,424, which was divided among his widow and children.

In 1976, members of the Casady family owned nearly 14% of all stock in Central National Bancshares, Inc., a bank holding company in Des Moines, Iowa.

== Education ==
Bishop Thomas Casady founded the Casady School in Oklahoma City, Oklahoma. Historically, many of Oklahoma City's elite families sent their children to the Casady School.

== Politics ==
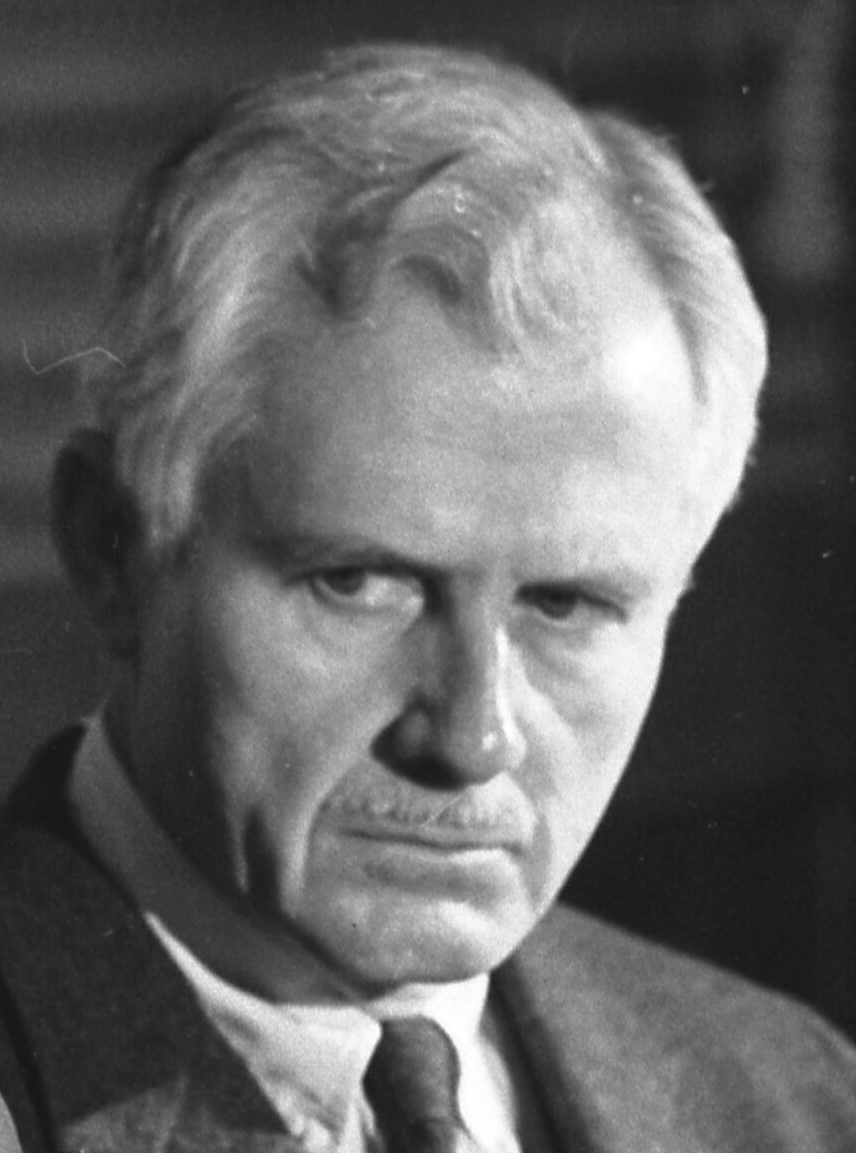
The journalist Simon Casady, 1966.

During the early pioneer history of Iowa, several members of the Casady family were elected to the Iowa General Assembly, including Samuel H. Casady in the Iowa House of Representatives and two state senators, Jefferson P. Casady and Phineas M. Casady. Samuel H. Casady, the brother of state senator Phineas M. Casady and banker Simon Casady, also served as a Sergeant in the Sioux City Cavalry Company during the Sioux Wars.

The journalist Simon Casady, son of the Episcopal Bishop Thomas Casady, was an influential political figure in California Democratic Party politics, serving as president of the California Democratic Council. Due to his publishing power in the southwest, he helped launch the political careers of Barry Goldwater, Lyndon B. Johnson, Lloyd Bentsen and other politicians.

== Real estate ==
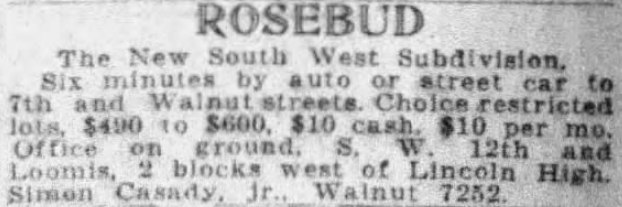
An advertisement for racially restricted lots sold by Simon Casady, Jr. in the Rosebud neighborhood, Des Moines Tribune, 1925.

Simon Casady, Jr. was a real estate developer on the south side of Des Moines, Iowa. Prior to the passage of the Fair Housing Act of 1968, which prohibited racial discrimination in housing, Casady built houses in the racially restricted Rosebud neighborhood of Des Moines.

== Religion ==
The Casady family is closely connected to the Cathedral Church of Saint Paul in Des Moines. Several members of the Casady family have been clergy in the Episcopal Church, including Reverend P. M. Casady and his father Thomas Casady, who was the son the banker Simon Casady and Sarah Conarroe Casady (Griffiths) and grandson of Phineas M. Casady.

== Entertainment ==
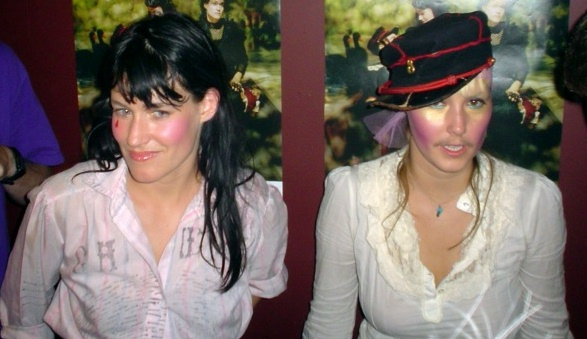
Bianca and Sierra Casady of CocoRosie, 2007.

The journalist Simon Casady's grandson is the Hollywood talent manager and producer Guymon Casady.

Simon Wheeler Casady III, son of Pioneer co-founder Simon Casady, Jr. and father of Timothy Casady, was the paternal grandfather of Bianca Leilani Casady and Sierra Rose Casady of the band CocoRosie. Timothy Casady was an anthropologist and New Age shaman. Timothy Casady and his ex-wife Christina Chalmers were associates of the New Age spiritual leader Brooke Medicine Eagle and Timothy Casady is thanked as a supporter in the introduction to Medicine Eagle's 2009 book The Last Ghost Dance: A Guide for Earth Mages.

== Legacy ==
The Casady Mausoleum in Woodland Cemetery of Des Moines is the resting place for many members of the Casady family, including Thomas Casady and Phineas M. Casady. Woodlawn Cemetery is the oldest cemetery in Des Moines. The first burial in the cemetery was in 1850 of Phineas M. Casady's one-year-old son Thomas Casady. In 1995, the Des Moines Tribune reported that the mausoleum had been broken into and vandalized at least 4 times over the previous 15 years, noting that intruders had done damage to the vault and one of the chambers, but that no evidence of candles or Satanic symbolism were left behind. Cemetery staff reported that the intruders had attempted to access the less accessible third tier of the crypt, possibly looking to loot jewelry, but police were not able to find a motive for the break-in. In 2009, the mausoleum was vandalized again. According to Gene Casady, bricks had been installed decades before to discourage vandalism, but this had not deterred burglars and scavenger hunters looking for relics.

=== Pioneer heritage ===
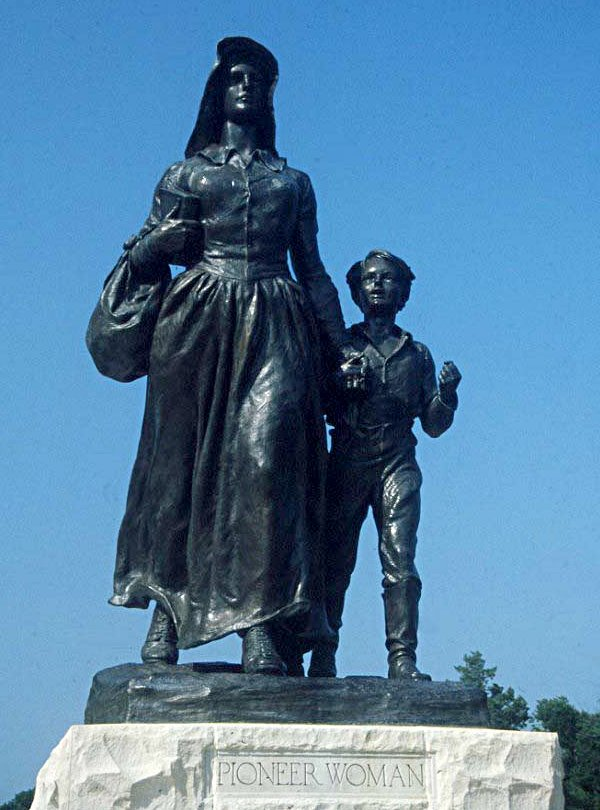
Pioneer Woman statue in Ponca City, Oklahoma, circa 2005.

Members of the Casady family have been actively involved in pioneer heritage groups that have celebrated the Casady family and other prominent families of Iowa for being the first white settlers of the state, such as the Des Moines Pioneers club. In 1952, Phineas M. Casady's grandson Reverend P. M. Casady spoke on "Pioneers and Pioneer Days in Des Moines" at the 58th annual Des Moines Pioneers event. Phineas M. Casady had attended the club's first dinner when it was founded in 1895. In 1910, Simon Casady was elected president of the club.

A 1925 article in the Sioux City Journal noted that Lizzie Casady, the daughter of Samuel H. Casady, was the first white child to be born in Sioux City, Iowa. A Sioux City historical organization was interested in creating a historical marker to celebrate the birth of the first white child in the city.

Phineas M. Casady was the first member and longtime Vice President of the Scotch-Irish Society of America and was responsible for the Society's sixth convention being held in Des Moines in 1894. In their proceedings, the Society praised Casady as "one of the pioneers of Iowa, going there in the days of the Indian and the buffalo" and who found "little difficulty inspiring others with his racial pride and enthusiasm."

Episcopal Bishop of Oklahoma Thomas Casady provided the invocation at the unveiling ceremony for the Pioneer Woman statute in Ponca City, Oklahoma, which celebrates the history of women as homesteaders.

== See also ==
- Edward Temple (banker)
- History of Iowa
- Hubbell family
- Wallace family
