= Edward Temple (banker) =

Iowa banker

Edward Ames Temple
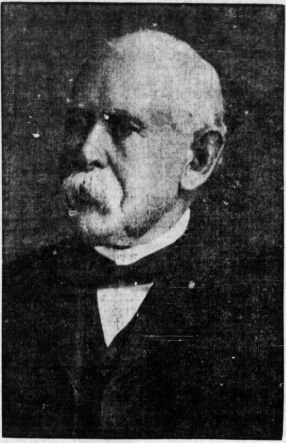
- Born: September 23, 1831; Des Moines, Iowa, US
- Died: February 12, 1909 (aged 77); Orlando, Florida
- Occupation: Banker
- Known for: Founding what is now the Principal Financial Group
- Spouse: Elizabeth Swett

Edward Ames Temple (September 23, 1831 – February 9, 1909) was a prominent American banker and pioneer in Iowa, best known for his role in founding the Bankers Life Association, which later evolved into Principal Financial Group, one of the largest insurance and financial services corporations in the United States.

== Early life ==
Temple was born on September 23, 1831, in Lebanon, Illinois, one of 9 children. In 1837, as a young child, Temple's family moved to Burlington in Iowa Territory. His father George Temple was a politician who became Speaker of the House in Iowa's Third General Assembly.

== Career ==
Temple began working as a clerk at a Burlington, Iowa, post office at age 15. Temple founded the Bankers Life Insurance Company in 1879, along with several other Des Moines businessmen, including Phineas M. Casady and Simon Casady.

== Death ==
Temple died suddenly from heart failure on February 9, 1909, at the age of 77. He was staying in Orlando, Florida for the winter.

== See also ==
- Casady family
- History of Iowa
- Insurance in the United States
