= MSON =

MSON may refer to:

- Malone School Online Network, of which the Casady School is part
- Multiple sclerosis associated optic neuritis, a kind of Optic neuropathy
