= George Temple =

George Temple may refer to:

- George Temple (mathematician) (1901–1992), English mathematician
- George Temple (priest) (1933–2003), Archdeacon of Bodmin
- George Arthur Temple (1887–?), English footballer
- George Temple (politician) (1804–1878), member and speaker of the Iowa House of Representatives
- George Temple, character in Key Largo

== See also ==
- George Temple-Poole (1856–1934), British architect and public servant
