= Robert M. Moody =

American bishop

The Right Reverend Robert M. Moody
- Bishop of Oklahoma
- Church: Episcopal Church
- Diocese: Oklahoma
- Elected: September 19, 1987
- In office: 1989-2007
- Predecessor: Gerald N. McAllister
- Successor: Edward J. Konieczny
- Previous post: Coadjutor Bishop of Oklahoma (1988-1989)

Orders
- Ordination: May 29, 1967 by J. Milton Richardson
- Consecration: February 6, 1988 by Edmund Lee Browning

Personal details
- Born: July 23, 1939 (age 86) Baltimore, Maryland, United States
- Denomination: Anglican
- Education: Rice University, University of Texas
- Alma mater: Virginia Theological Seminary

Robert Manning Moody (born July 23, 1939) was bishop of the Episcopal Diocese of Oklahoma from 1989 to 2007.

== Early life and education ==
Born in Baltimore, Maryland, his father, a physician, moved his family to Houston, Texas, where they were members of St Martin's parish. Moody attended the local public schools and graduated from Rice University in 1962, and from the University of Texas the following year. His parish then sponsored him at the Virginia Theological Seminary, where he decided to become a priest. He received a Master of Divinity in 1966. He would later return and receive an honorary Doctor of Divinity in 1988.

== Ordained ministry ==
Ordained as a deacon on June 21, 1966, he was ordained to the priesthood on May 29, 1967, by Bishop J. Milton Richardson. After ordination, he became a chaplain at Baylor University 1966–1968, then priest in charge of St Matthew's church in Waco, Texas, and vicar at St James Church in McGregor, Texas before becoming an assistant at the Church of St John the Divine in Houston, Texas, and serving at St James Church in Riverton, Wyoming. He served as rector of Grace Church in Alexandria, Virginia (1985-1987) prior to his election as Bishop of Oklahoma.

== Episcopacy ==
Moody was elected as the Coadjutor Bishop of Oklahoma on September 19, 1987, at St Paul's Cathedral on the first ballot. He was then consecrated to the episcopate on February 6, 1988, with Presiding Bishop Edmond L. Browning as chief consecrator. During his episcopate, he dealt with the aftermath of the bombing of the Murrah Federal Building. His involvement included evacuating a housing development, providing pastoral assistance in a nearby hospital, and distributing over $500,000 to those in financial need.

He also pursued an active ministry among Native Americans, appointing an Indian missioner and developing a center for Indian ministry in Watonga, Oklahoma. He retired in 2007.
