= Guymon Casady =

American talent manager (born 1969)

Guymon Patrick Casady (born March 12, 1969) is an American media executive, producer and talent manager.

Casady is a founding partner of leading management and production company, Entertainment 360, in Los Angeles, California. He was executive producer of the television series Game of Thrones, The Terror, Ripley on Netflix, and Apple TV +’s current hit show Stick. He has been nominated for nine Emmy Awards, winning four.

He is the originating producer of the feature films Steve Jobs, which was nominated for two Oscars; Hope Springs, which was nominated for a Golden Globe; Office Christmas Party; Deep Water; Bruised; and The Fall Guy. He originated and was an executive producer on the $800M grossing franchise The Expendables.

== Early life and education ==
He is the son of Kent Casady and Janed Guymon. His great-grandfather was Edward "E.T." Guymon, after whom the city of Guymon, Oklahoma is named. His paternal grandfather was the publisher and political figure Simon Casady (1908-1995). He is a descendant of Daniel Boone through his paternal grandmother. His great-grandfather Thomas Casady was the first bishop in the Episcopal Diocese of Oklahoma, and founder of the Casady School. His great-great grandfather Simon Casady (1852-1928) was a prominent banker in Iowa.

Casady grew up in Mission Hills, San Diego and graduated from University of San Diego High School in 1987, where he played both Varsity Tennis and Soccer his Sophomore and Junior years. As a Senior, he rowed crew for a San Diego Rowing Club team, and that year won the CA State Championship on his way to winning a Gold Medal in the Junior 4 with Coxain at the U.S. National Championships in Indianapolis, Indiana. He earned a B.A. in European history and art history from the University of Pennsylvania.

== Career ==
Casady began his career in Hollywood working as an assistant in the Motion Picture Talent Department at Creative Artists Agency. He left CAA to work for Propaganda Films CEO Steve Golin. He was promoted to a development/production executive and worked on The Game and Being John Malkovich. Casady left Propaganda to work as a manager at Industry Entertainment. On November 13, 2002, Casady, Eric Kranzler and David Seltzer started a new venture, Management 360, a start up talent management production company they cofounded with Suzan Bymel, Evelyn O’Neill, and Daniel Rappaport. Shortly after forming Management 360, the company signed an overall production deal with Warner Bros. Studio on July 7, 2003.

From 2011 to 2017, Casady produced the Motion Picture & Television Fund's annual Reel Stories, Real Lives evening to raise money and build next generation awareness for the organization. In 2024, he was the originating producer of the Universal Studios movie, The Fall Guy, which starred Ryan Gosling and Emily Blunt.

== Personal life ==
He is married to Robyn Norris Casady. They have 2 children.

== Filmography ==
He was a producer in all films unless otherwise noted.

=== Film ===
Year	Film	Credit
1999	The Match	
2004	The Final Cut	Executive producer
2005	Stay	Executive producer
2008	My Best Friend's Girl	
2009	The Killing Room	
2009	Paper Man	
2010	The Expendables	Executive producer
2012	Hope Springs	
2012	The Expendables 2	Executive producer
2014	The Expendables 3	Executive producer
2015	The Gallows	
2015	Steve Jobs	
2016	Office Christmas Party	
2019	The Gallows Act II	
2019	Queen & Slim	Executive producer
2020	Bruised	
2022	Deep Water	
2023	Expend4bles	Executive producer
2024	The Fall Guy	
TBA	Isle of Man	

Thanks

Year	Film	Role
2001	Monster's Ball	Thanks
2013	Snitch	Special thanks
2014	Grace	Special thanks
2017	November Criminals	The director wishes to thank

=== Television ===
Year	Title	Credit	Award	Notes	Ref
2002	Terry Tate: Office Linebacker	Executive producer		Television short	
2003−04	Hope & Faith	Executive producer			
2007	Cavemen	Executive producer			
2008	1%			Television film	
2016	Mary + Jane	Executive producer			
2017	Damnation	Executive producer			
2018	Queen America	Executive producer			
2011−19	Game of Thrones	Co-executive producer	Primetime Emmy Award for Outstanding Drama Series (2015); Primetime Emmy Award for Outstanding Drama Series (2016); Nominated - Primetime Emmy Award for Outstanding Drama Series (2011); Nominated - Primetime Emmy Award for Outstanding Drama Series (2012); Nominated - Primetime Emmy Award for Outstanding Drama Series (2013); Nominated - Primetime Emmy Award for Outstanding Drama Series (2014)		
2018−19	The Terror	Executive producer			
2024	Ripley	Executive producer			
2025	Stick	Executive producer			

Miscellaneous crew

Year	Title	Role
1993−95	Fallen Angels	Assistant: Steve Golin
