= Francis Key Brooke =

American missionary bishop (1852–1918)

The Right Reverend Francis Key Brooke
- Missionary Bishop of Oklahoma and Indian Territory
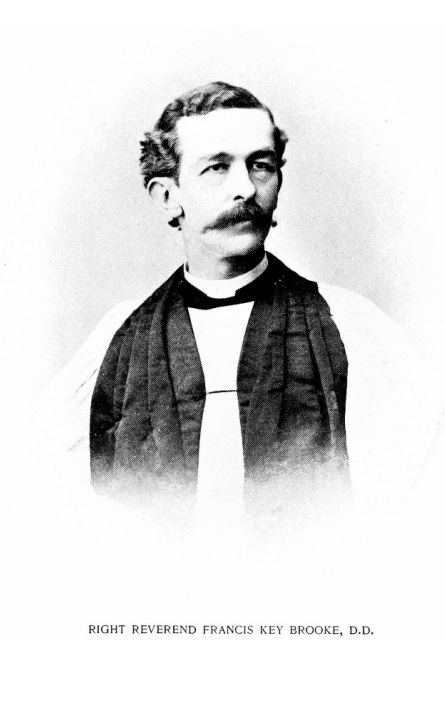
- Church: Episcopal Church
- See: Oklahoma
- Elected: 1892
- In office: 1893-1918
- Successor: Theodore Payne Thurston

Orders
- Ordination: May 6, 1877 by Thomas Augustus Jaggar
- Consecration: January 6, 1893 by Daniel S. Tuttle

Personal details
- Born: November 2, 1852 Gambier, Ohio, United States
- Died: October 22, 1918 (aged 65) Chicago, Illinois, United States
- Buried: Kenyon Cemetery, Gambier, Ohio
- Denomination: Anglican
- Parents: John Thomson Brooke & Louisa R. Hunter
- Spouse: Mildred R. Baldwin (m. 1881)
- Children: 1
- Education: Kenyon College
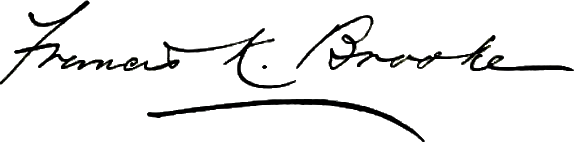
- Signature

Francis Key Brooke (November 2, 1852 – October 22, 1918) was a missionary bishop of what is now the Episcopal Diocese of Oklahoma, serving from 1893 to 1918.

== Early life and education ==
Brooke was born on November 2, 1852, in Gambier, Ohio, the son of the Reverend John Thomson Brooke (1800-1861) and Louisa Rebecca Hunter Brooke (1806-1883). He studied at Kenyon College and graduated with a Bachelor of Arts in 1874, and a Master of Arts in 1881. He was awarded an honorary Doctor of Sacred Theology from Kansas Theological School in 1892, and an honorary Doctor of Divinity from the University of the South in 1911, and another from Kenyon in 1912.

== Ordained ministry ==
Brooke was ordained deacon on November 21, 1875, in Christ Church, Cincinnati and then priest, on May 6, 1877, in Christ Church, Springfield, Ohio, on both occasions by Bishop Thomas Augustus Jaggar of Southern Ohio. He was rector of Grace Church in College Hill, Cincinnati from 1875 to 1877, and then rector of Christ Church in Portsmouth, Ohio, between 1877 and 1880. Between 1880 and 1884 he served as rector of St James' Church in Piqua, Ohio, before becoming rector of Grace Church in Sandusky, Ohio. In 1886 he moved to St Peter’s Church in St. Louis, while in 1888 he became rector of Trinity Church in Atchison, Kansas, where he remained until 1893. He was also an honorary canon of Grace Cathedral in Topeka, Kansas.

== Episcopacy ==
Brooke was elected by the General Convention to be the first Missionary Bishop of Oklahoma and was consecrated on January 6, 1893, in Grace Cathedral with Presiding Bishop Daniel S. Tuttle as chief consecrator. In 1895, his title changed to Missionary Bishop of Oklahoma and Indian Territory. Brooke established Trinity Church in Guthrie, Oklahoma, as his cathedral church until 1908, when he moved the diocesan headquarters to Oklahoma City and established St Paul's Cathedral. During his episcopacy the Missionary District of Oklahoma was divided in two, with the creation of the Missionary District of Eastern Oklahoma, which was reunited with the Missionary District of Oklahoma in 1919. Brooke died in office on October 22, 1918, in Chicago and was buried at Gambier, Ohio.

== Family ==
Brooke married Mildred Ruth Baldwin (1859-1928) on January 5, 1881. They had one son who died in 1907. Mildred died on August 23, 1928.
