= W. R. Chilton Powell =

Episcopal bishop

The Right Reverend W. R. Chilton Powell
- Bishop of Oklahoma
- Church: Episcopal Church
- Diocese: Oklahoma
- Elected: June 5, 1951
- In office: 1953-1977
- Predecessor: Thomas Casady
- Successor: Gerald N. McAllister
- Previous post: Coadjutor Bishop of Oklahoma (1951-1953)

Orders
- Ordination: November 1938 by Douglass H. Atwill
- Consecration: November 2, 1951 by Henry Knox Sherrill

Personal details
- Born: March 11, 1912 Devils Lake, North Dakota, United States
- Died: December 31, 1994 (aged 82) Oklahoma City, Oklahoma, United States
- Buried: St Paul's Cathedral
- Denomination: Anglican
- Parents: Albert Morrell Powell, Elsie Maria Mooers
- Spouse: Frances Elizabeth Lamont (m. 1941)
- Children: 2
- Education: Carleton College

Winslow Robert Chilton Powell (March 11, 1912 - December 31, 1994) was an American prelate of the Episcopal Church who served as the second Bishop of Oklahoma from 1953 to 1977.

== Early life and education ==
Powell was born on March 11, 1912, in Devils Lake, North Dakota, to Albert Morrell Powell and Elsie Maria Mooers. He studied at Carleton College and graduated with a Bachelor of Arts in 1934 and awarded an honorary Doctor of Law in 1960. He also earned a Master of Sacred Theology in 1938, and an honorary Doctor of Divinity in 1953 from Seabury-Western Theological Seminary. Oklahoma City University awarded him a Doctor of Sacred Theology in 1968.

== Ordained ministry ==
Powell was ordained deacon in April 1938 and priest in November the same year by Bishop Douglass H. Atwill of North Dakota. He initially served as deacon-in-charge, and later as priest-in-charge of St James' Church in Grafton, North Dakota, St Peter's Church in Park River, North Dakota, St Luke's Church in Walshville, and the Church of the Redeemer in Bathgate, North Dakota. In 1940, he became curate at Gethsemane Church in Minneapolis and chaplain at St Barnabas Hospital in Minneapolis. In 1943, he was elected as Dean of Trinity Cathedral in Omaha, Nebraska, remaining there until 1951.

== Episcopacy ==
Powell was elected on the third ballot as coadjutor bishop of Oklahoma on June 5, 1951, and was consecrated on November 2, 1951, with Presiding Bishop Henry Knox Sherrill as principal consecrator. He succeeded as diocesan bishop of Oklahoma after Casady's retirement in 1953. At Powell's election, there were 35 clergy and a diocesan budget of $100,000.00. Powell is best remembered as a missionary bishop. Under his care, the diocese opened many new missions all over Oklahoma, including the panhandle as well as St Crispin's, a new conference center in Seminole. While Bishop of Oklahoma, Powell also chaired the Prayer Book Commission that produced the 1979 Book of Common Prayer. At the end of his episcopate, there were 77 congregations, missions and parishes.
