= Poulson C. Reed =

American cleric (born 1970)

The Right Reverend Poulson C. Reed
- Bishop of Oklahoma
- Church: Episcopal Church
- Diocese: Oklahoma
- Elected: December 14, 2019
- In office: 2020-present
- Predecessor: Edward J. Konieczny

Orders
- Ordination: January 2003
- Consecration: May 30, 2020 by Larry R. Benfield

Personal details
- Born: April 30, 1970 (age 56)
- Denomination: Anglican
- Spouse: Megan Reed (m. 2004)
- Children: 3

Poulson C. Reed (born April 30, 1970) is an American cleric who is the bishop of the Episcopal Diocese of Oklahoma.

== Biography ==
On August 8, 2020, Reed succeeded the Rt. Rev. Edward J. Konieczny as bishop of Oklahoma. At the time of his election on December 14, 2019, Reed was rector of All Saints’ Episcopal Church and Day School in Phoenix, Arizona. He was elected by the diocesan convention on the second ballot. There was one other candidate, the Rev. Scott Gunn of Cincinnati, Ohio.

Before becoming rector in 2009, Reed served St. John's Cathedral in Denver, Colorado, as canon from 2002 to 2007 and as sub-dean from 2007 to 2009.

Reed was consecrated bishop on May 30. 2020 at St. Paul's Cathedral in Oklahoma City. His consecration was delayed over a month due to the COVID-19 pandemic and occurred with a minimum number of people present. All Saints' Episcopal Church, in Phoenix, was unable to find a new permanent rector until March 19, 2023, when the Rev. Dr. Perry Michael Pauley, became Rector.

He is married and has three sons.

== Education ==
Reed was educated at the St Christopher’s School in Richmond, Virginia, and then at the University of Virginia from where he graduated in 1992 with a double major in English and Religion. He also studied at the University of Utah from where he earned a Master of Fine Arts in Creative Writing, and later at the Yale Divinity School from where he graduated with a Master of Divinity in 1997.
