= Daniel Rappaport =

American producer

Daniel Rappaport is an American producer.

He is a founding partner, with Guymon Casady, of the talent management firm Management 360.

== Filmography ==
Year	Title	Role	Director	Notes
1997–2001	King of the Hill	Co-producer	Several	TV series (14 episodes)
1998	Judas Kiss	Executive producer	Sebastian Gutierrez	
1999	Office Space	Producer	Mike Judge	
2002–2003	Fastlane	Executive producer	Several	TV series (22 episodes)
2005	Junebug	Executive producer	Phil Morrison	
2006	Faceless	Executive producer	Joe Carnahan	TV movie
2007	Cavemen	Executive producer	Several	TV series (13 episodes)
2013	I Am Victor	Executive producer	Mark Goffman	TV movie
2016	Office Christmas Party	Producer	Will Speck and Josh Gordon	
2017	The Bourbon Kings	Executive producer	David Mackenzie	TV movie
