= Edward J. Konieczny =

American Anglican cleric (born 1954)

The Right Reverend Dr. Edward J. Konieczny
- Bishop of Oklahoma
- Church: Episcopal Church
- Diocese: Oklahoma
- Elected: May 5, 2007
- In office: 2007-2020
- Predecessor: Robert M. Moody
- Successor: Poulson C. Reed

Orders
- Ordination: 1994 (deacon); 1994 (priest)
- Consecration: September 15, 2007 by Katharine Jefferts Schori

Personal details
- Born: December 20, 1954 (age 71) Spokane, Washington, United States
- Denomination: Anglican
- Spouse: Debra Konieczny (m. 1978)
- Children: 2

Edward J. Konieczny (Note: The surname is pronounced "con YETCH nee".) (born December 20, 1954) was the fifth bishop of the Episcopal Diocese of Oklahoma, United States. After studies at Church Divinity School of the Pacific, he was ordained to the diaconate and priesthood in 1994. He was elected bishop on May 5, 2007, and consecrated September 15, 2007. He served until his successor was installed in August 2020. In 2022, he was appointed by Oklahoma Governor Kevin Stitt to the Oklahoma Pardon and Parole Board.

== Early life ==
Bishop Ed was born December 20, 1954, at Fairchild Air Force Base in Spokane, Washington. In 1955, the family, including Ed and his two siblings, older sister Helene and younger brother William, moved to Anaheim, California.

== Law enforcement career ==
After graduating from high school, Konieczny continued his education in a community college on a part-time schedule, while he began a career in law enforcement. He earned an AA degree in Administration of Justice and a BA degree in Criminal Justice. From 1972 to 1975, he held several civilian positions, then as a Sworn Officer with the police departments of Anaheim and Garden Grove, California from 1975 until 1993.

== Religious career ==
After 18 years in police work, Konieczny's career turned toward religion. He enrolled in the Church Divinity School of the Pacific, where he earned a Master of Divinity degree. He continued his religious education at Seabury-Western Theological Seminary, where he earned a Doctor of Ministry in Church Growth and Development. Later in his church career, both schools have awarded him a Doctor of Divinity degree, honoris causA.

=== Election as bishop ===
On May 5, 2007, Konieczny, then serving as rector of St. Matthew's Episcopal Church in Grand Junction, Colorado, was elected as the Bishop of the Episcopal Diocese of Oklahoma. The Diocese of Oklahoma covers the entire state 70,000 square miles (180,000 km^{2}), 69 congregations, three Diocesan Schools, two Retirement/Assisted Living Homes, a Camp and Conference Center and multiple other institutions and ministries. (Note: Prior to his posting in Grand Junction, he had served several congregations in the Diocese of Texas.) The election was held in the St. Paul's Cathedral at Oklahoma City. Out of six candidates, he received the most lay votes and the most clergy votes on the first ballot. His predecessor as Bishop of Oklahoma was Robert M. Moody, who had been elected in 1987, and had served since 1989. Bishop Ed announced his retirement effective in 2020, and on December 14, 2019, the diocesan convention elected Poulson Reed as bishop coadjutor. Reed succeeded him as Bishop Diocesan December 31, 2020.

=== Activities as bishop ===
In addition to the normal duties as bishop of a diocese, he has played an important and highly visible role in the national and international church, such as: member of Bishops United Against Gun Violence, member of Executive Council of The Episcopal Church, member of Executive Committee of Executive Council of The Episcopal Church, member of the Presiding Bishop's Council of Advice, member of the Presiding Bishop Transition and Installation Committee, Co-chair of the Joint Nominating Committee for the Election of the Presiding Bishop, and Key Note Speaker at the Reclaiming the Gospel of Peace Conference. Additionally, he serves as the Episcopal Representative of the Episcopal Church to the Anglican Consultative Council; Chair of the Brazil Bilateral Committee; member of the Anglican Bishops in Dialogue Consultation; and established a Companion Relationship between the Diocese of Oklahoma the Anglican Diocese of Uruguay. In 2017, he was instrumental in partnering with Bishop Jacop Ayebo and completing construction of St. James Church in Bolgatanga, Ghana. Bishop

Bishop Konieczny, along with 16 other religious leaders representing the Oklahoma Council of Churches, issued a public document, "Theological Statement in Opposition to the Death Penalty." The document refutes political arguments that the Bible supports (or even commands) the death penalty, and publicly calls for the Government of Oklahoma to abolish the death penalty in the state.

== Oklahoma pardon and parole board ==
In 2022, Governor Kevin Stitt appointed Konieczny to the Oklahoma Pardon and Parole Board. After it was reported that he signed a "Theological Statement in Opposition to the Death Penalty," he "assured the governor he is prepared, should he believe it to be appropriate, to vote in support of the death penalty in accordance with the law of Oklahoma."

== Personal life ==
Ed Konieczny and his wife, Debra, married in 1978. They have two sons, one daughter-in-law, and five grandchildren.

== See also ==
- Oklahoma Pardon and Parole Board
- Cathy Stocker
- Richard Smothermon
- David Prater (attorney)
- Larry Morris

== See also ==
- List of Episcopal bishops of the United States
- Historical list of the Episcopal bishops of the United States

Preceded by	Bishop of Oklahoma; 1967-1983	Succeeded by Robert Moody
