= Episcopal Diocese of Oklahoma =

Diocese of the Episcopal Church in the United States

Coordinates: 35°28′31″N 97°30′57″W

Diocese of Oklahoma Diœcesis Oklahomensis

Location
- Country: United States
- Territory: Oklahoma
- Ecclesiastical province: Province VII
- Subdivisions: 6 Regions

Statistics
- Congregations: 64 (2024)
- Members: 13,576 (2023)

Information
- Denomination: Episcopal Church
- Rite: Episcopal
- Established: January 16, 1938
- Cathedral: St Paul's Cathedral

Current leadership
- Bishop: Poulson C. Reed

Map
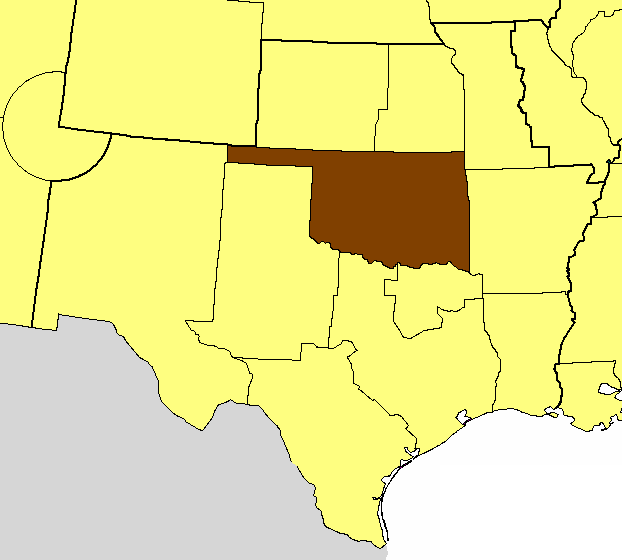
- Location of the Diocese of Oklahoma

Website
- www.epiok.org

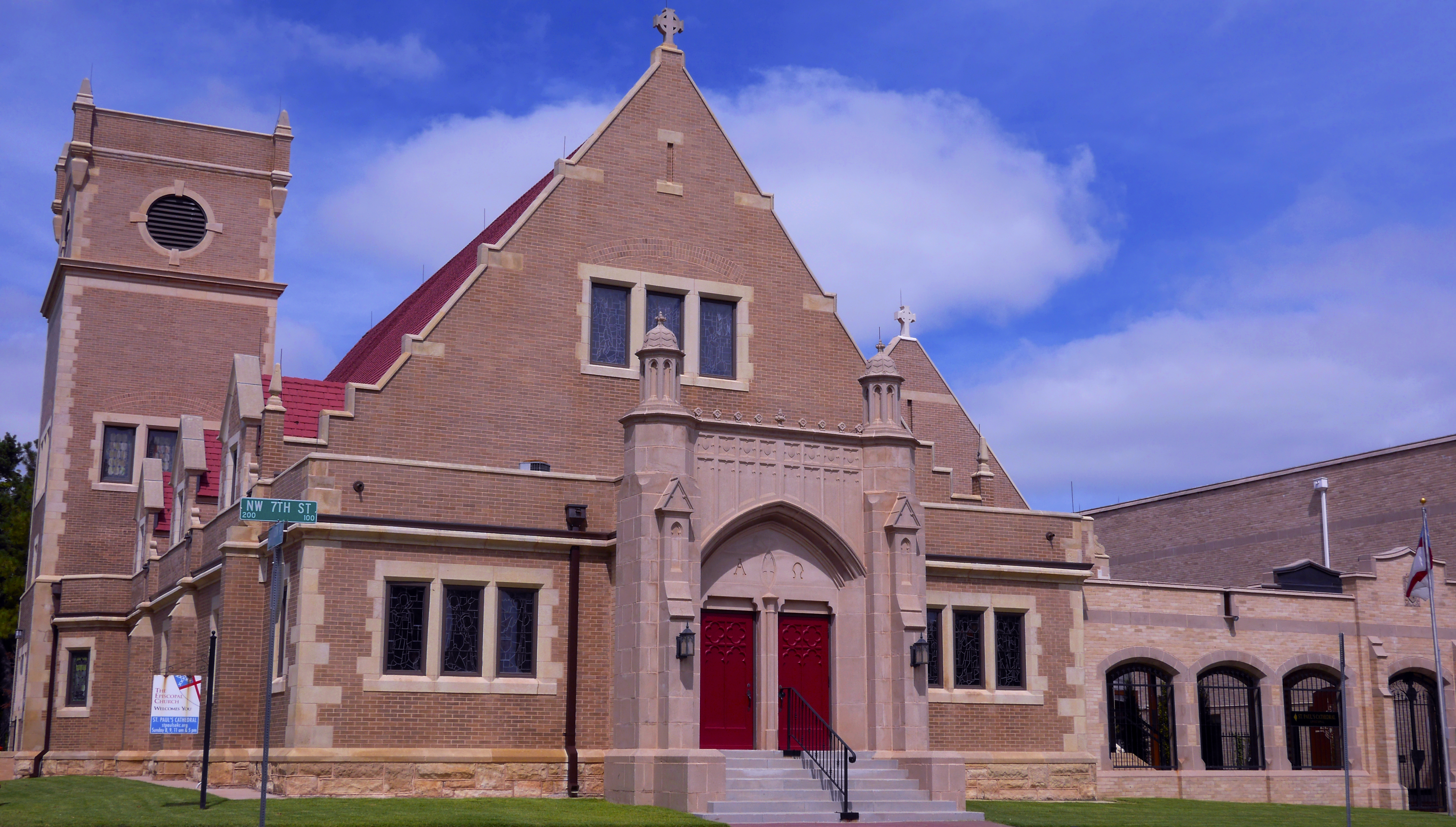
St. Paul's Cathedral

The Episcopal Diocese of Oklahoma dates back to 1837 as a Missionary District of the Episcopal Church in the United States of America. The General Convention of the Episcopal Church recognized the Diocese of Oklahoma in 1937. The diocese consists of all Episcopal congregations in the state of Oklahoma. The ninth Bishop and sixth diocesan Bishop is Poulson C. Reed, consecrated in 2020.

The diocese reported 16,718 members in 2015 and 13,576 members in 2023; no membership statistics were reported in 2024 national parochial reports. Plate and pledge income for the 64 filing congregations of the diocese in 2024 was $14,786,260. Average Sunday attendance (ASA) was 4,210 persons, down from 5,396 in 2016.

The see city is Oklahoma City, where St. Paul's Cathedral is located.

The Missionary District of Eastern Oklahoma was a missionary district of the Episcopal Church. On October 11, 1910, the General Convention of the Episcopal Church formed the missionary district from the preexisting Missionary District of Oklahoma. The missionary district was short-lived and recombined with the Missionary District of Oklahoma in 1919. The Rt. Rev. Theodore Payne Thurston was elected the first and only bishop of the missionary district.

== Previous bishops ==
=== Missionary/Eastern Oklahoma ===
==== Francis Key Brooke, 1893–1911 (1911–1918) ====
Elected bishop of the Missionary District of Oklahoma and Indian Territory on January 6, 1893, Brooke arrived in Guthrie on January 19 and established Trinity Church as his cathedral church. In 1908, he moved the diocesan headquarters to Oklahoma City.

==== Theodore Payne Thurston, (1911–1919) 1919-1926 ====
An Illinois native, who served the church in Minnesota, Thurston was consecrated bishop of Eastern Oklahoma at Minneapolis in 1911. The previous year General Convention had divided the state into two dioceses. Thurston was socially liberal and a low churchman like Brooke. He chose Muskogee as his see city and Grace Church as his pro-cathedral.

The Convocation of the church in May 1919, after the death of Brooke, voted to recombine the two districts, and Thurston moved to Oklahoma City and St. Paul's. The move was approved by the national church in October.

==== Eugene Cecil Seaman, 1926-1927 ====
Seaman had only recently been consecrated bishop of North Texas in 1925 when he was selected to serve as acting bishop of Oklahoma in 1926 because of the failing health of Thurston. He was a graduate of Sewanee, The University of the South, Tennessee. During his short service to the diocese, Seaman confirmed 270 persons, consecrated St. Paul's Cathedral, and smoothed the way for Casady to lead the state from a missionary district to a diocese.

=== Diocesan ===
==== Thomas Casady, 1927-1953 ====
Thomas Casady was born in Des Moines, Iowa on June 6, 1881, the son of Simon Casady and Sarah Conarroe. He was educated in the public schools of Des Moines and graduated from the University of Iowa in 1902.

His father Simon Casady, a banker, had hoped he would follow him in the banking business, but Thomas developed a vocation for Holy Orders. He was a member of the Sigma Chi fraternity, a Freemason, and a Knight Templar.

In 1903 he entered General Theological Seminary. After he became bishop he received an honorary doctorate of sacred theology from General Seminary and an honorary doctorate of divinity from Sewanee, The University of the South, Tennessee.

He was ordained deacon in June 1906, and priest in February 1907. On 27 June 1906 he married Frances LeBaron Kasson, and they had six children.

On October 2, 1927, at All Saints' Church, Omaha, Nebraska he was consecrated bishop by the presiding bishop, John Gardner Murray, Bishop of Maryland, assisted by Theodore N. Morrison, Bishop of Iowa; George A. Beecher, Bishop of Nebraska and a number of other bishops.

Casady was the third missionary bishop of Oklahoma and the first diocesan bishop.

==== Frederick Putnam, Suffragan 1963-1979 ====
Frederick Warren Putnam Jr. was born in Red Wing, Minnesota in 1917. He received his education in the public schools in Minneapolis and graduated from the University of Minnesota in 1939. That fall he entered Seabury-Western Theological Seminary, graduating with a bachelor of Theology in 1942. In March of that year he was made deacon and ordained priest in October. He married Helen Kathryn Prouse and they had three children. In November 1962 he was elected to be Oklahoma's first Suffragan Bishop. Putnam died June 7, 2007.

==== W. R. Chilton Powell, 1953-1977 ====
Chilton Powell was consecrated bishop coadjutor in 1951 and became the bishop of Oklahoma after Casady's retirement in 1953. At Powell's election, there were 35 clergy and a diocesan budget of $100,000.00. Powell is best remembered as a missionary bishop. Under his care, the diocese opened many new missions all over Oklahoma, including the panhandle as well as St Crispin's, a new conference center in Seminole. While Bishop of Oklahoma, Powell also chaired the Prayer Book Commission that produced the 1979 Prayer Book. At the end of his episcopate, there were 77 congregations, missions and parishes. He was an alumnus of Carleton College and Seabury-Western Theological Seminary.

==== Gerald Nicholas McAllister, 1977-1989 ====
Following the retirement of Powell, Gerald Nicholas McAllister became Bishop in 1977 and remained so until 1989 when Robert M. Moody was elected. During the time of McAllister, outreach became a priority. The Venture in Mission program raised 2.3 million dollars and committed half of that to overseas missions. The concept of total ministry became a diocesan priority. Cluster ministries were instituted, hospital chaplains and college chaplains were added, two Episcopal schools flourished, and two residential facilities were opened for the elderly. At the end of McAllister's time as bishop, the diocese was more financially sound and had grown to 80 congregations, missions, parishes, and two conference centers.

==== Robert M. Moody, 1989-2007 ====
Robert Moody was elected as the bishop coadjutor on September 19, 1987, at St. Paul's Cathedral on the first ballot. Upon the retirement of McAllister he became our fourth diocesan bishop. He was committed to mission by pursuing an active ministry among the Native Americans with the appointment of an Indian missioner and the development of a center for Indian ministry in Watonga Oklahoma. On April 19, 1995, the Murrah building was destroyed by a bombing. Moody and the diocesan staff assisted in the evacuation of residents from a housing development across from the diocesan offices, provided pastoral assistance in a nearby hospital, and in the days following the blast the distribution of over $500,000 to those in financial need as a result of the bombing.

==== Edward J. Konieczny, 2007-2020 ====
The former rector of St. Matthew's Episcopal Church in Grand Junction, Colorado, Ed Konieczny was elected on the first ballot on May 5, 2007, at St. Paul's Cathedral. Konieczny was consecrated 5th bishop on September 15, 2007, at Oklahoma City University. Presiding Bishop Katharine Jefferts Schori was chief consecrator. Co-consecrators included Edward S. Little, II, Bishop of Northern Indiana; Robert M. Moody, retiring bishop of Oklahoma; and Robert J. O'Neill, Bishop of Colorado, who was the preacher.

From 1975 until 1992, Konieczny served as a Police Officer in Garden Grove and Anaheim, CA. He earned an associate of arts degree in administration of justice from Long Beach City College; a bachelor's degree in criminal justice from Cal State Fullerton; his Master of Divinity from Church Divinity School of the Pacific; and a Doctor of Ministry from Seabury-Western Theological Seminary. He was ordained a deacon and priest in 1994. He served churches in Texas and Colorado. In 2007, he received a Doctor of Divinity, honoris causa, from Seabury-Western Theological Seminary, and a Doctor of Divinity, honoris causa from Church Divinity School of the Pacific in 2014.

Konieczny and his wife, Debbie, have two sons and three grandchildren.

==== Poulson Reed, 2020 - ====
Poulson C. Reed was elected bishop coadjutor on December 14, 2019. At the time of his election he was rector of All Saints’ Episcopal Church and Day School in Phoenix, Arizona. He was consecrated on May 30, 2020 at St. Paul's Cathedral in Oklahoma City, and seated on August 8, 2020, the feast of St. Dominic.

== Institutions of the Diocese ==
- Ardmore Village, Ardmore
- St. Simeon's Episcopal Home, Tulsa
- St. Crispin's Conference Center, Wewoka

== Supported schools ==
- Casady School, Oklahoma City
- Holland Hall, Tulsa
- Oak Hall Episcopal School, Ardmore
- St. Dunstan's Preschool, Tulsa
- St. John's Episcopal Preschool, Tulsa
- St. John's Episcopal School, Oklahoma City
- St. Mary's Episcopal School, Edmond

== Sources ==
Botkin, S. (1958). The Episcopal Church in Oklahoma, Oklahoma City: American-Bond Printing Company.
