= Gerald N. McAllister =

American Episcopal bishop

The Right Reverend Gerald Nicholas McAllister
- Bishop of Oklahoma
- Church: Episcopal Church
- Diocese: Oklahoma
- Elected: November 20, 1976
- In office: 1977-1989
- Predecessor: W. R. Chilton Powell
- Successor: Robert M. Moody

Orders
- Ordination: September 24, 1954 by Everett Holland Jones
- Consecration: April 15, 1977 by John Allin

Personal details
- Born: February 16, 1923 San Antonio, Texas, United States
- Died: June 10, 2014 (aged 91) San Antonio, Texas, United States
- Denomination: Anglican
- Parents: Walter Williams McAllister & Leonora Elizabeth Alexander
- Spouse: Helen Earle Black (m. 1953)
- Children: 4
- Education: Virginia Theological Seminary

Gerald Nicholas McAllister (February 16, 1923 – June 10, 2014) was an American Episcopal bishop. He was the third bishop of the Episcopal Diocese of Oklahoma from 1977 to 1989.

== Early life and education ==
McAllister was born in San Antonio, Texas, on February 16, 1923 to Walter Williams McAllister and Leonora Elizabeth Alexander. He was educated at the local public schools and graduated from Southern Arizona School of Boys and later attended the University of Texas at Austin between 1939 and 1942. In 1942, during World War II, he left university to join the Merchant Marines as an ordinary seaman but later entered the US Air Force. He served as a B-17 radar navigator-bombardier with the Eighth Air Force Pathfinder School in England from 1943 to 1945. After the war, he returned to the United States and ran a ranch between 1946 and 1948. He then enrolled at the Virginia Theological Seminary to study for the priesthood and graduated in 1951. He was also awarded an honorary Doctor of Divinity by the seminary in 1977.

== Ordained ministry ==
McAllister was ordained to the diaconate on September 30, 1953, and to the priesthood a year later, on September 24, 1954. He married Helen Earle Black on October 2, 1953 and together had four children. His initial post was as deacon, and later priest-in-charge of the Church of the Epiphany in Raymondville, Texas, the Church of the Incarnation in Corpus Christi, Texas, and St Francis' Church in Victoria, Texas, from 1951 until 1963. In 1963, he became a canon to the ordinary in the Episcopal Diocese of West Texas while in 1970 he became rector St David's Church in San Antonio, Texas. In 1967, McAllister was celebrant at the White House wedding of Lynda Bird Johnson, daughter of president Lyndon Baines Johnson, to Marine Captain Charles S. Robb.

== Bishop ==
On November 20, 1976, he was elected as the third Bishop of Oklahoma on the 10th ballot, and was consecrated bishop on April 15, 1977 in Oklahoma City by Presiding Bishop John Allin. During the time of McAllister, outreach became a priority. The Venture in Mission program raised $2.3 million and committed half of that to overseas missions. The concept of total ministry became a diocesan priority. Cluster ministries were instituted, hospital chaplains and college chaplains were added, two Episcopal schools flourished, and two residential facilities were opened for the elderly. At the end of McAllister's time as bishop, the diocese was more financially sound and had grown to 80 congregations, missions, parishes, and two conference centers. He retired in 1989. Later he served as a bishop-in-residence at the Seminary of the Southwest and chaplain to Clergy Families in the Diocese of West Texas from 1991 to 1993.

== Death ==
Bishop McAllister died in his native San Antonio, Texas, on June 10, 2014, aged 91.
