= Simon Casady (journalist) =

American journalist (1908–1995)

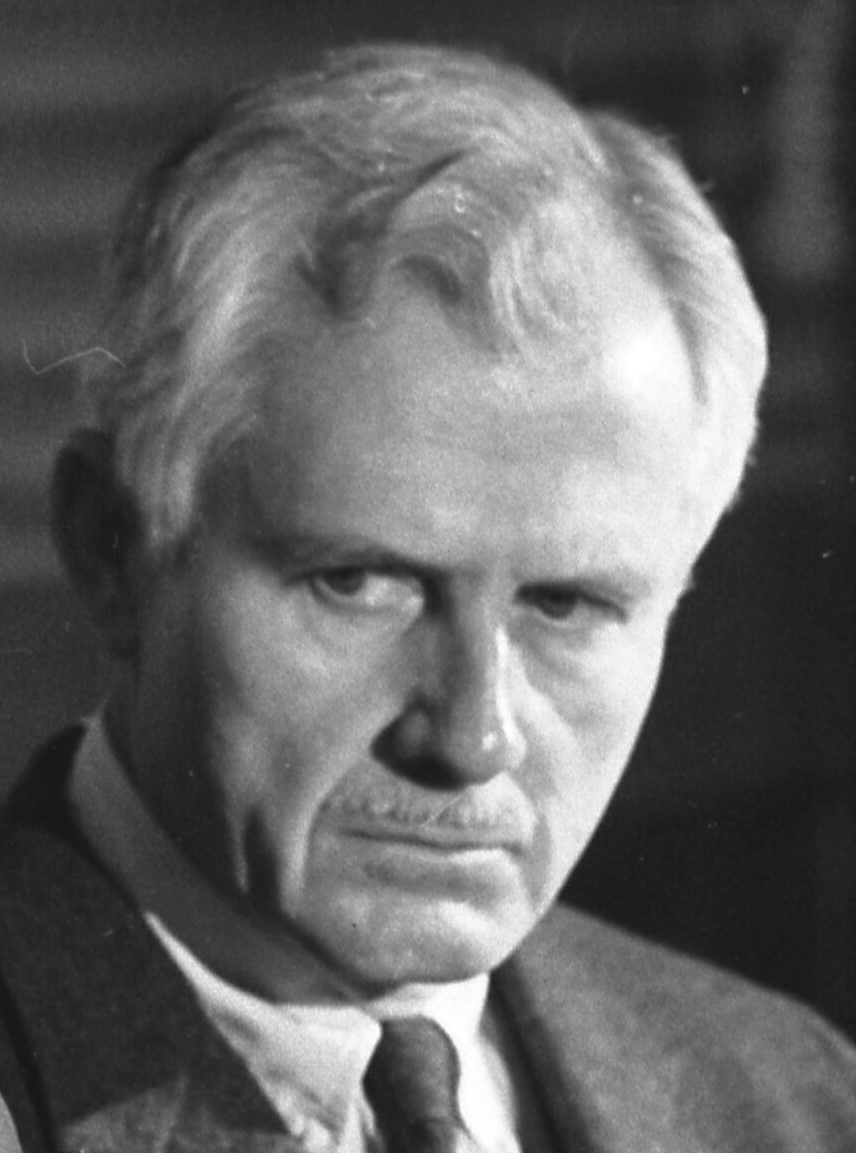
- Cassady in 1966
- Born: July 17, 1908; Des Moines, Iowa
- Died: April 27, 1995 (aged 86); La Jolla, California
- Other name: "Cyanide Si"
- Occupations: Journalist, politician
- Spouse: Virginia Kent Boone
- Children: 5
- Parent(s): Thomas Casady and Frances B. Kasson
- Relatives: Guymon Casady (grandchild)

Simon Casady (July 17, 1908 – March 27, 1995) was a journalist and political figure who was influential in California Democratic Party politics, serving as president of the California Democratic Council. Due to his publishing power in the southwest, he helped launch the political careers of Barry Goldwater, Lyndon B. Johnson, Lloyd Bentsen and other politicians. Casady was known for his liberal political positions, including his opposition to the Vietnam War, support for the civil rights movement, environmentalism, and the Farmworkers' Movement, and was known as a frequent defender of Fidel Castro and the Sandinistas. He was the former publisher for El Cajon Valley News (later The Daily Californian), The Arizona Republic and the Phoenix Gazette.

== Early life and career ==
Born in Des Moines, Iowa, in 1908, Casady was the son of Episcopal Bishop Thomas Casady, grandson of prominent Iowa banker Simon Casady, and great-grandson of Iowa state senator Phineas M. Casady. Casady attended the University of the South in Sewanee Tennessee, the University of Iowa, and the University of Oklahoma.

== Career ==
Casady career in journalism began in 1928, when he worked as a reporter for the Oklahoma City Times. He also worked as a wire editor for the Associated Press. He was an editor at Valley Morning Star in Harlingen, Texas in 1937. In 1950, he was hired by Eugene C. Pulliam to be the editor of both The Arizona Republic and The Phoenix Gazette in 1950. In 1952, Casady met and became friends with Barry Goldwater, who was a Phoenix City Council member and a candidate for the United States Senate. Shortly after riding in a motorcade with presidential candidate Adlai Stevenson, Casady resigned and moved to San Diego, where he bought the El Cajon Valley News and turned it into The Daily Californian.

Due to the editorials he wrote denouncing the Vietnam War, Casady had a lengthy FBI file. His opposition to the Vietnam War was divisive among California Democrats in the 1960s and Casady earned the nickname "Cyanide Si". California Governor Edmund G. (Pat) Brown Sr. ousted Casady from his position as head of the California Democratic Council because of his stance on Vietnam in 1965. In 1966, Casady served as co-chairman of the National Conference for New Politics, alongside Julian Bond. Casady also served as president of the San Diego-based "Friends of the Black Panthers (F.O.B.P.)." Until his expulsion in 1971, Casady worked in Singapore for three years as a consultant with the Executive Overseas Service Corps during the government of Lee Kuan Yew. After that he lived in Guatemala before returning to San Diego in 1979.

Casady's only attempt at electoral politics was running against Pete Wilson in the 1979 San Diego mayoral election, an election which he lost. His campaign organization was headquartered at the eighteen-room Guymon House, a mansion in the upper class Mission Hills neighborhood of San Diego that was owned by his son Kent and daughter-in-law Janed.

== Personal life ==
Casady was married to Virginia Kent Boone, a direct descendant of Daniel Boone. They had five children. Virginia died in 1987. Simon Casady died on April 27, 1995. His grandson is the talent manager and producer Guymon Casady.
