= Iowa-Des Moines National Bank Building =

- U.S. National Register of Historic Places
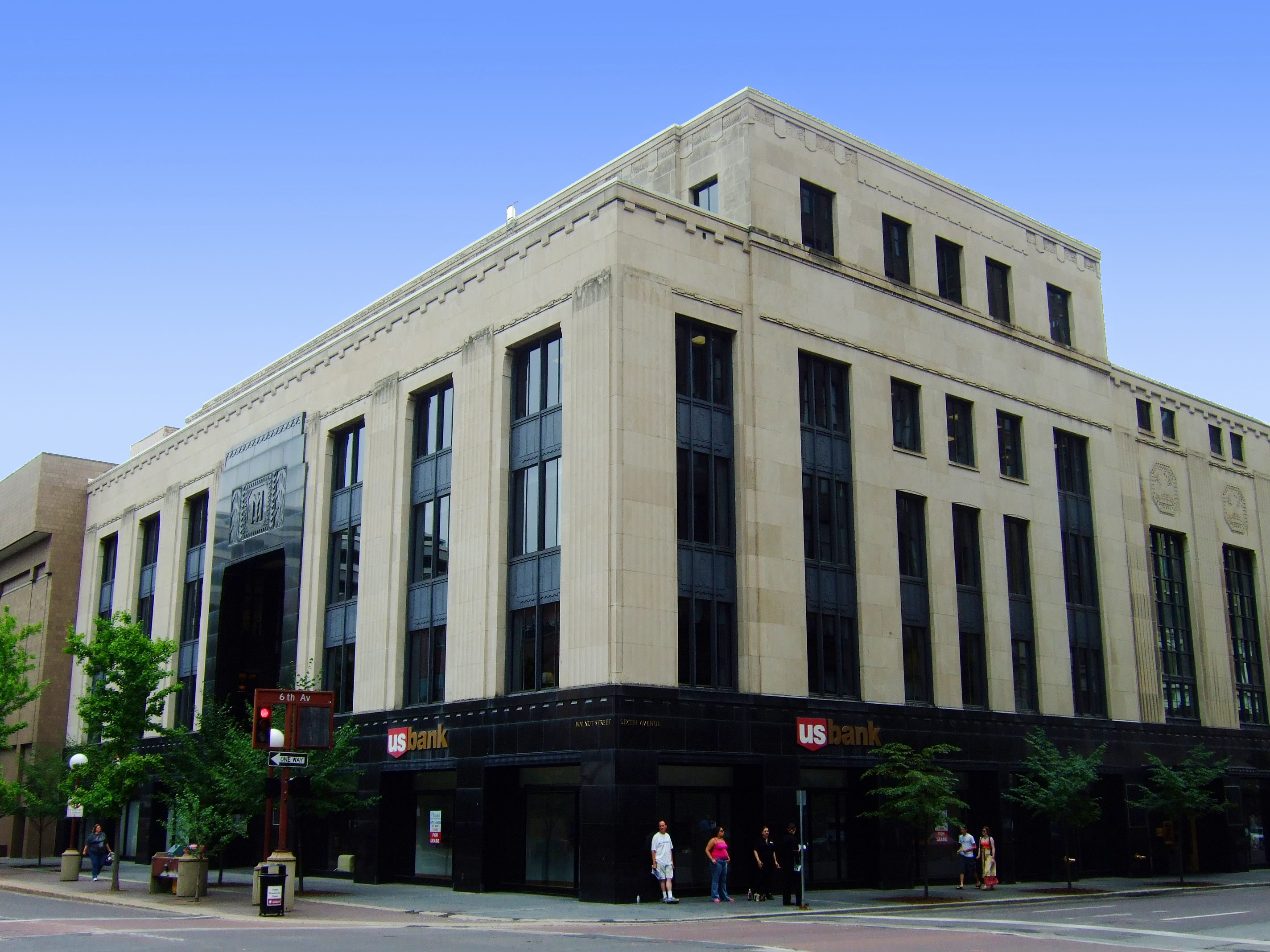

- Location within Iowa Location within the United States
- Location: 520 Walnut St. Des Moines, Iowa
- Coordinates: 41°35′08.6″N 93°37′27.1″W
- Area: less than one acre
- Built: 1931-1932
- Architect: Proudfoot, Rawson, Souers & Thomas
- Architectural style: Art Deco
- NRHP reference No.: 79000924
- Added to NRHP: July 10, 1979

The Iowa-Des Moines National Bank Building, also known as the Valley National Bank Building and U.S. Bank, is a historic building located in downtown Des Moines, Iowa, United States. Designed by the prominent Des Moines architectural firm of Proudfoot, Rawson, Souers & Thomas, it was designed to be a 21- or 22-story building. It is one of the few downtown commercial buildings built in the Art Deco style. It is also thought to be one of the first bank buildings to put the banking room on the second floor while placing retail space on the first floor. Given its location in an area dominated by retail this made sense. This location had a bank on it since 1882 when the Des Moines National Bank built here. The present building was the result when Des Moines National Bank merged with Iowa National Bank and Des Moines Savings Bank and Trust Company in 1929. The original design for the building was a five-story base and a set-back rental office tower on top of it. The base was begun in 1931 and completed a year later. The building is composed of black polished granite on the first floor and the upper floors are Bedford stone. There is a recessed entrance in the center bay of the main facade. The fifth floor was meant to be the base of the office tower that was never built.

In 1909, the banker Simon Casady of Central State bank purchased the former Des Moines Savings Bank building from H. McMillan for $25,000. Following his purchase of the building, Casady severed relations with the Des Moines Savings Bank.

Iowa-Des Moines National Bank remained here until 1974 when they moved to the Financial Center. The building was bought by Valley National Bank in 1977 and restoration and renovation of the building was completed in 1979. It was listed on the National Register of Historic Places in 1979, and was later acquired by U.S. Bancorp.

== See also ==
- Casady family
