= 1979 San Diego mayoral election =

- September 18, 1979
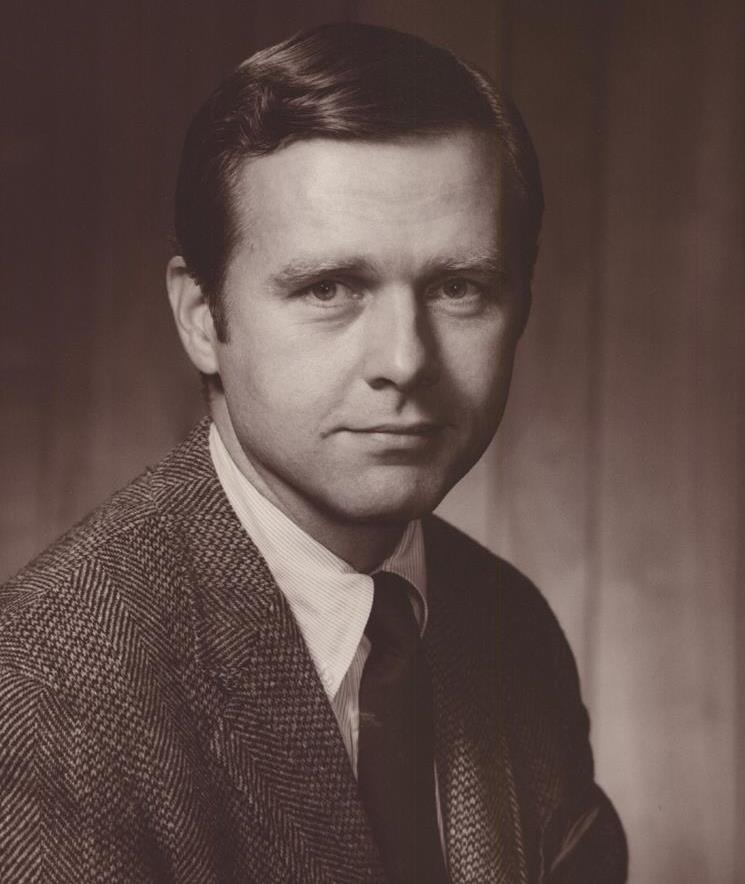

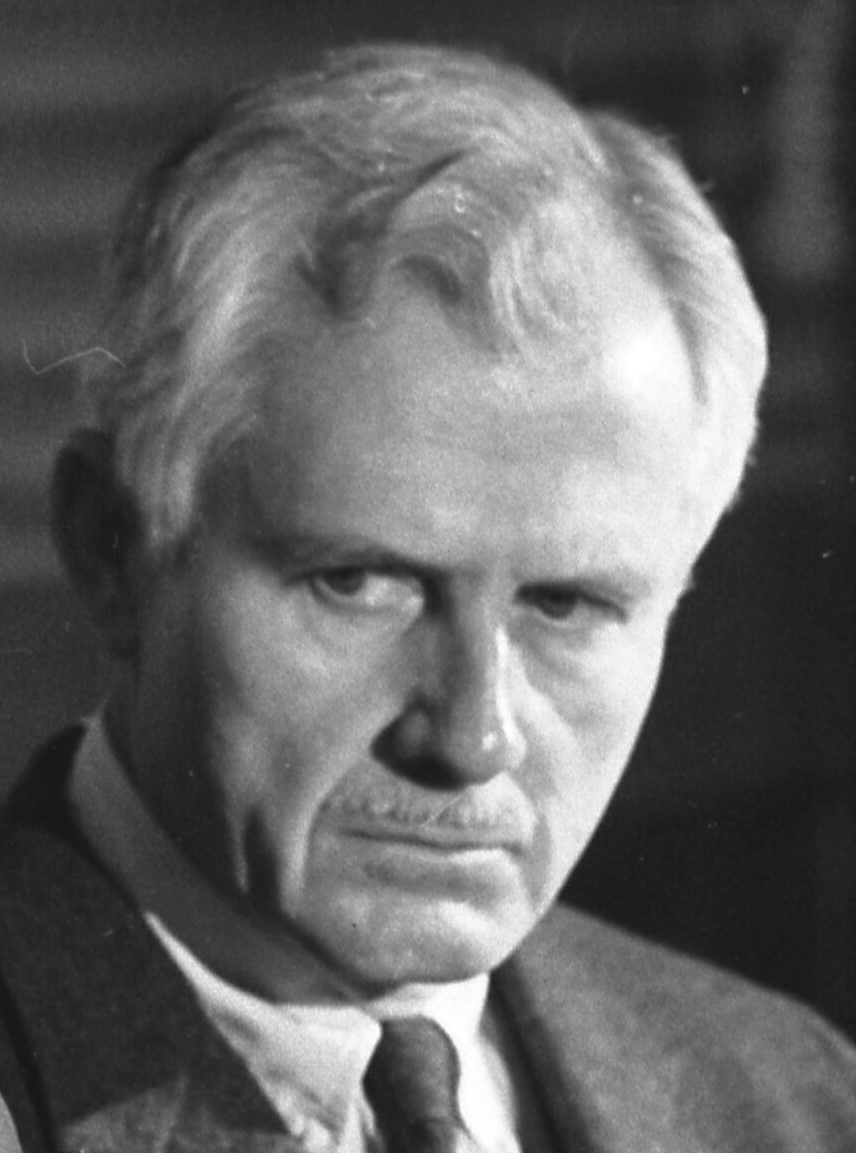
Nominee	Pete Wilson	Simon Casady
Party	Republican	Democratic
Popular vote	90,530	46,502
Percentage	61.6%	31.6%
Mayor before election
Pete Wilson
Republican
Elected mayor
Pete Wilson
Republican

The 1979 San Diego mayoral election was held on September 18, 1979, to elect the mayor for San Diego. Incumbent Pete Wilson stood for reelection for a third term. As the result of a voter-approved amendment to the City Charter to align mayoral elections with state elections, the winner of the election stood to receive an extended five-year term.

Municipal elections in California are officially non-partisan, though some candidates do receive funding and support from various political parties. The non-partisan primary was held September 18, 1979. Wilson received a majority of the votes in the primary and was reelected mayor with no need for a runoff election.

== Candidates ==
- Pete Wilson, mayor of San Diego
- Simon Casady, former newspaper publisher
- John Kelley, businessman and perennial candidate
- Charlotte Buchanan, homemaker
- Michael Gomez, high school counselor
- Jerry Lester, pharmacist and minister
- Raul Gonzalez

== Campaign ==
On June 19, 1979, former newspaper publisher Simon Casady announced he would run for mayor of San Diego. Casady was considered the strongest challenger to Wilson's attempt at a third term. Although the position of mayor is officially non-partisan, Casady, a liberal Democrat and long-time activist, hoped to run a partisan campaign against Wilson. Wilson officially announced his candidacy for re-election on June 20, 1979. Wilson emphasized his positive record in his previous two terms as mayor in his re-election campaign.

On September 18, 1979, Wilson was re-elected easily with 61.6 percent of the vote. Casady came in second with 31.6 percent of the vote. The five remaining candidates garnered less than 7 percent vote combined. Because Wilson received a majority of the vote, he was reelected outright with no need for a runoff election.

== Primary election results ==
San Diego mayoral primary election, 1979
Party	Candidate	Votes	%
Republican	Pete Wilson (incumbent)	90,530	61.6
Democratic	Simon Casady	46,502	31.6
Nonpartisan	John Kelley	3,158	2.1
Nonpartisan	Charlotte Buchanan	2,398	1.6
Republican	Michael Gomez	1,804	1.2
Nonpartisan	Jerry Lester	1,677	1.1
Socialist Workers	Raul Gonzalez	963	0.7
Total votes		147,032	100

== General election ==
Because Wilson was elected mayor with a majority of the votes in the primary, no runoff election was held.
