= Theodore Payne Thurston =

American Anglican bishop

The Right Reverend Theodore Payne Thurston
- Missionary Bishop of Oklahoma
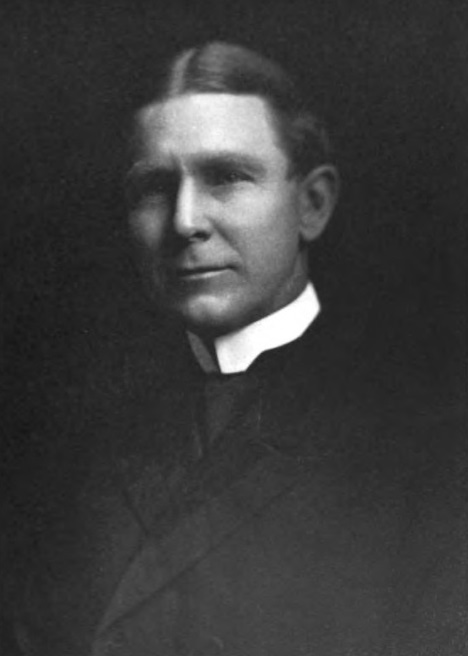
- Church: Episcopal Church
- See: Oklahoma
- Elected: 1919
- In office: 1919-1926
- Predecessor: Francis Key Brooke
- Successor: Eugene Cecil Seaman
- Previous post: Missionary Bishop of Eastern Oklahoma (1911-1919)

Orders
- Ordination: June 23, 1895 by Henry Benjamin Whipple
- Consecration: January 25, 1911 by Daniel S. Tuttle

Personal details
- Born: June 30, 1867 Delavan, Illinois, United States
- Died: January 28, 1941 (aged 73) San Diego, California, United States
- Buried: Fairlawn Cemetery, Oklahoma City
- Denomination: Anglican
- Parents: Benjamin Eaton Thurston & Mary Ann Siddall
- Spouse: Jane Mitchell (m. 1904; died 1905) Daisy Dean Carroll (m. 1920)
- Education: Trinity College

Theodore Payne Thurston (June 30, 1867 – January 28, 1941) was the first and only missionary bishop of the Missionary District of Eastern Oklahoma and the second missionary bishop of Oklahoma in the Episcopal Church between 1919 and 1926.

== Early life and education ==
A son of Benjamin Eaton Thurston and Mary Ann Siddall, Theodore was born in Delavan, Illinois, on June 30, 1867. He was educated at the public schools in Philadelphia, graduating in June 1883 and then from Shattuck School at Faribault, Minnesota, in 1887. He also studied at Trinity College in Hartford, Connecticut, graduating with a Bachelor of Arts in 1891 and awarded an honorary Doctor of Divinity in 1911. He completed his theological studies at the Episcopal Theological School in Cambridge, Massachusetts, in 1894.

== Ordained ministry ==
Thurston was ordained deacon on June 20, 1894, by Bishop William Lawrence of Massachusetts, in St John's Memorial Chapel, Cambridge, Massachusetts. He was then ordained priest on June 23, 1895, by Bishop Henry Benjamin Whipple at St Paul's Church in St. Paul, Missouri. He initially served as rector of St Paul's Church in Owatonna, Minnesota, until 1897 when he moved to Winona, Minnesota, to become rector of St Paul's Church. In 1903 he went to Minneapolis, becoming rector of St Paul's Church where he remained until 1911.

== Episcopacy ==
Thurston was elected Missionary Bishop of Eastern Oklahoma in 1910 and was consecrated on January 25, 1911, with Presiding Bishop Daniel S. Tuttle as chief consecrator. He was the first and only Missionary Bishop of Eastern Oklahoma with a tenure between 1911 and 1919. The District of Eastern Oklahoma was created on October 11, 1910, and reunited with the District of Oklahoma on October 10, 1919. Upon reunification, Thurston became Missionary Bishop of the combined Eastern and Oklahoma District, while after 1928, the title was changed to Bishop of the Missionary District of Oklahoma. He was considered to be socially liberal and a low churchman like his predecessor. He retained the post until his resignation on October 15, 1926, due to poor health.

== Family ==
Thurston married Jane Mitchell on September 21, 1904, but she died eight months later on May 14, 1905. On June 8, 1920, he married Daisy Dean Carroll in St Paul's Cathedral. Daisy was previously married to Milton Hamlin Speer who died in 1906. She died March 23, 1968.
