= California Democratic Council =

The California Democratic Council (CDC), is an independent California non-profit founded at conferences at Asilomar and Fresno conferences in 1952–53 by future U.S. Senator Alan Cranston, State Senator George Miller, Jr. and other liberal Democratic Party activists, inspired by Adlai Stevenson's presidential candidacy; they intended to organize the existing "Stevenson Clubs" into a grassroots movement to win back control of California State Government from the Republicans, who then held the Governor's office and both US Senate seats.

According to the group's website, the organization, which coordinates the activities of Democratic clubs statewide, is the only one of its kind in the United States. After Cranston, its founding President, CDC has also been headed by Joseph Wyatt, Tom Carvey, Simon Casady, Gerald Hill, John L. Burton (former State Senate President Pro Tem and Congressman, and former Chair of the official California Democratic Party organization), Nathan Holden, Wallace Albertson, Lia Triff Belli, Robert W. Farran, African-American leader Quincy Beaver, State Party Secretary Jim Clarke, DNC member Chris Stampolis, Henry Vandermeir, Emilie Gatfield, Hilary Crosby, and since November 2019, Iyad Afalqa, who is the Chair Emeritus of the CDP Arab American Caucus.

President John F. Kennedy said: "I have always regarded the California Democratic Council as one of the United States’ most important centers of citizen participation in politics." In reality, Kennedy and his brother, Robert, were closely allied in California to the Los Angeles political organization of Jesse Unruh, the powerful Speaker of the State Assembly, who was considered the bete noire of the liberal organization.

== History ==
The CDC "club movement" played an important role in the 1958 election of Governor Edmund G. "Pat" Brown and a slate of other State Democratic candidates (including Cranston as State Controller), the first Democratic administration in the State since the New Deal.

In 1964, CDC endorsed the US Senate candidacy of its founding father, Alan Cranston, but he lost the Democratic nomination to former Kennedy Press Secretary Pierre Salinger - who was later defeated by George Murphy, the Republican nominee, in the General election.

In 1966, the Council was bitterly split over the issue of American military entanglement in Vietnam. After a "horrendous struggle" in which Governor Brown and Cranston sided with a CDC faction that was more moderate in opposing the war policy of President Lyndon Johnson, both Brown and Cranston were booed and hissed at a CDC Convention. Cranston's sister later concluded that this rift with the Democratic leadership marked the beginning of CDC's decline.

Two years later, CDC endorsed the anti-war presidential candidacy of Senator Eugene McCarthy over that of Senator Robert F. Kennedy, who was supported by Unruh. Kennedy won the California Democratic Primary, but was killed on the day of his victory.

Later that year, Cranston was at last elected US Senator, remaining in office for the next 24 years. Though he had somewhat distanced himself from the Council, his election symbolized the height of "citizen participation" in Party politics.

As of 2016, the CDC continued to provide support services freely to the California Democratic Party Caucuses, County Democratic Committees and Chartered Democratic Clubs of California. Currently numbering over 512 active organizations as listed on the CDC Main website under the Clubs/Organization Listing (currently under construction), ALL of these organizations are automatically members of the CDC and receive basic rights and services from the CDC. Organizations which choose to Affiliate with the CDC, receive additional services such as free websites, leadership training and increased delegate count at CDC meetings. For a complete listing of current CDC projects and services please consult the CDC Main website.

== Bibliography ==
- Francis Carney, "The Rise of the Democratic Clubs in California" (NY, 1960)
- "Organizational History", California Democratic Council Records, 1947-1988
