= Samuel H. Casady =

American politician

Iowa House of Representatives
- In office December 13, 1868 – December 9, 1870

Personal details
- Born: c. 1831 Connersville, Indiana, U.S.
- Died: 1873 Iowa, U.S.
- Party: Democratic
- Children: Lizzie Casady
- Relatives: Phineas M. Casady (brother), Jefferson P. Casady (brother)
- Profession: Politician

Samuel H. Casady (c. 1831 - 1873) was an American politician and one of the earliest Euro-American settlers in Iowa. A founder of Sioux City, Casady served as a Sergeant in the Sioux City Cavalry Company during the Sioux Wars and as a member of the Iowa House of Representatives.

== Early life ==
Casady was born in Connersville, Indiana in about 1831. His brothers were Phineas M. Casady and Jefferson P. Casady of the Casady family. His daughter Lizzie Casady was the first white child to be born in Sioux City. Lizzie married Finley Burke in 1877 and died during her first year of marriage. He was a Freemason and a member of the Methodist Episcopal Church.

== Career ==
In 1856, Casady moved from Indiana to Sioux City, Iowa, one of the first white settlers on the historically Indigenous Dakota land of the Western frontier. He fought in the Sioux Wars as part of the Sioux City Cavalry, an armed group of white settlers that was formed in November, 1861, and merged into the 7th Iowa Volunteer Cavalry as Company I in July, 1863. A year later, he was nominated to the Iowa Legislature for the district that now comprises Pottawattamie, Harrison, Crawford, Monona, Woodbury, and several other counties in northwestern Iowa. He later lived in Council Bluffs, Iowa.

== Death ==
Casady died on December 24, 1873, and is buried at Fairview Cemetery in Council Bluffs, Iowa.
