= Jefferson P. Casady =

American politician (1823–1898)

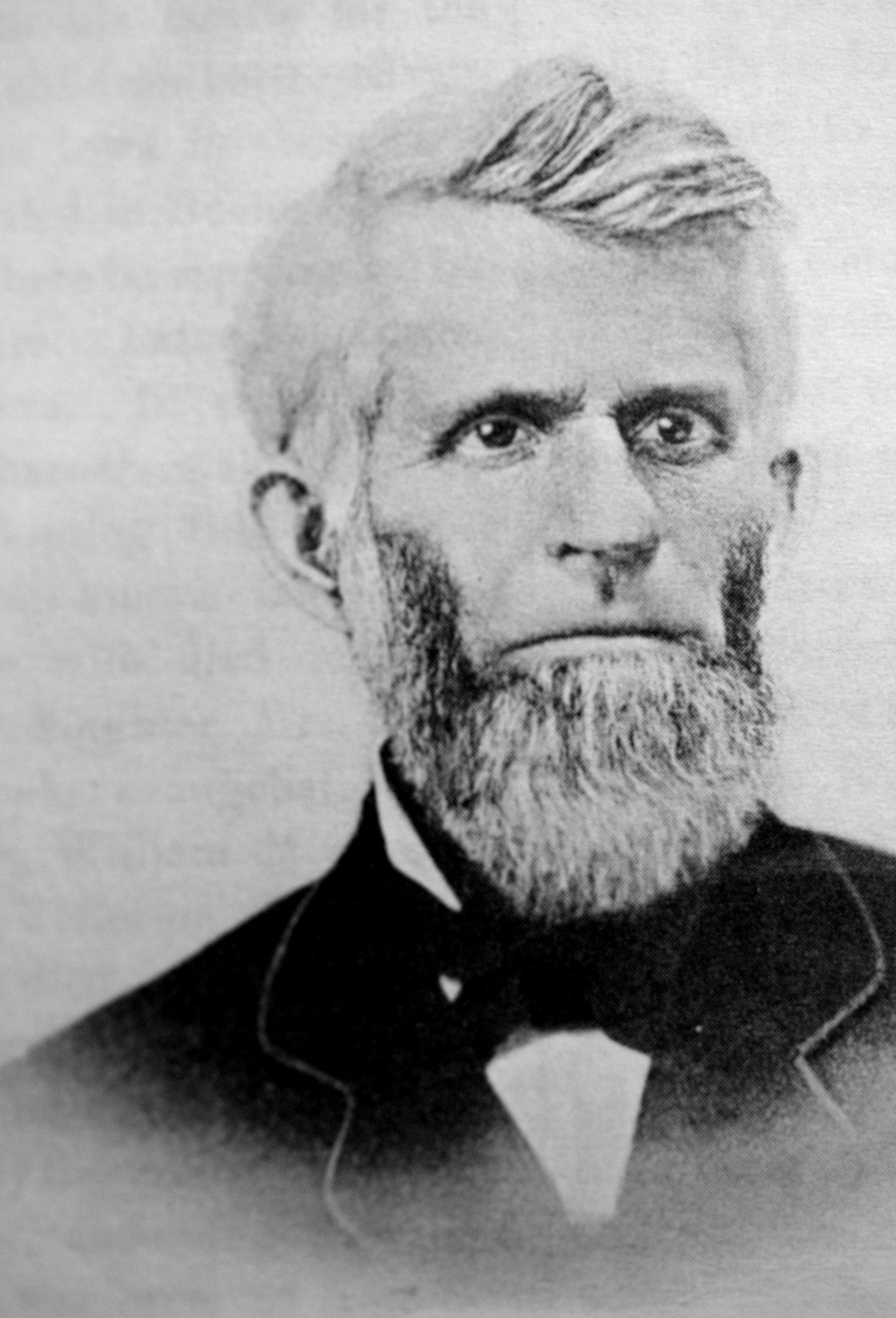

Iowa Senate
- In office December 13, 1868 – December 9, 1870

Member of the Iowa Senate
- In office December 10, 1870 – December 7, 1872

Personal details
- Born: September 1, 1828 Connersville, Indiana, U.S.
- Died: April 27, 1892 (aged 63) Council Bluffs, Iowa, U.S.
- Party: Democratic
- Spouse: Hannah Joiner
- Children: 5
- Relatives: Phineas M. Casady (brother), Samuel H. Casady (brother)
- Profession: Politician, lawyer, judge

Jefferson P. Casady (September 1, 1823 – April 27, 1892) was an American pioneer, real estate businessman, judge, lawyer, and state senator in Iowa. Casady and his siblings, including his brothers Phineas and Samuel, were members of the influential Casady family of bankers, politicians, landowners, and farmers who had a strong impact on the early history and legislation of Iowa. The Casady family were some of the earliest white settlers of Pottawattamie County.

== Early life ==
Born in Connersville, Indiana, Casady migrated to Iowa in 1852. His family was of Scotch-Irish descent. His father Simon Casady was a farmer, his brother Phineas M. Casady was a politician and judge, his brother Samuel H. Casady was a politician and a Sergeant who with the Sioux City Cavalry during the Sioux Wars, and his nephew Simon Casady was a prominent banker. He married Hannah Joiner in 1856, a woman who was born in Ohio in 1839 and moved to Council Bluffs in 1850 with her father Timothy Joiner. Together they had 5 children, but only 3 survived to adulthood: Ida, Thomas, and Albert.

== Career ==
Casady decided to pursue a career in law and was admitted to the bar in Des Moines, Iowa. His specialty was civil law, particularly real estate. Together with James D. Test and Hadley D. Johnson, Casady formed a real estate partnership that was located at the future location of the First National Bank building of Council Bluffs. In addition to his primary business in real estate, Casady also served as a county judge, a member of the Iowa State Senate, and the director of the Council Bluffs & St. Joseph Railroad. A life-long member of the Democratic Party, Casady also held active memberships in the Independent Order of Odd Fellows fraternal order as well as the First Presbyterian Church of Council Bluffs. He wife Hannah was known for holding church socials at the Casady home. She died of pneumonia on May 6, 1882, at age 44.

In January, 1882, Casady was appointed as one of the original trustees of the Free Public Library of Council Bluffs, now known as the Council Bluffs Public Library.

== Death ==
Casady died on April 27, 1898, and is buried at Fairview Cemetery in Council Bluffs, Iowa.

Iowa Senate
Preceded by Fitz Henry Warren	9th District; 1868 – 1871	Succeeded by John Young Stone
