= Thomas Casady =

American bishop (1881–1958)

The Right Reverend Thomas Casady
- Bishop of Oklahoma
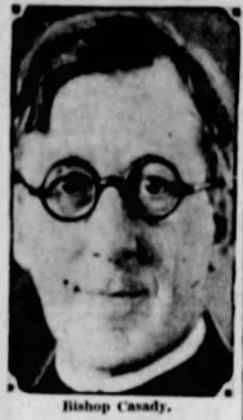
- Thomas Casady in 1929.
- Church: Episcopal Church
- See: Oklahoma
- Elected: June 1927
- In office: 1927-1953
- Predecessor: Theodore Payne Thurston
- Successor: W. R. Chilton Powell

Orders
- Ordination: February 10, 1907 by M. Edward Fawcett
- Consecration: October 2, 1927 by John Gardner Murray

Personal details
- Born: June 6, 1881 Des Moines, Iowa, United States
- Died: September 9, 1958 (aged 77) Norman, Oklahoma, United States
- Buried: Woodland Cemetery
- Denomination: Anglican
- Parents: Simon Casady & Sarah Conarroe Griffiths
- Spouse: Frances LeBaron Kasson (m. 1906; died 1951)
- Children: 6, including Thomas and Simon Casady
- Education: University of Iowa

Thomas Casady (June 6, 1881 – September 9, 1958) was the third missionary bishop of Oklahoma and the first diocesan bishop of the Diocese of Oklahoma in the Episcopal Church.

== Early life and education ==
A member of the Casady family of Iowa, Thomas was born in Des Moines, the son of prominent banker Simon Casady and Sarah Conarroe Casady (Griffiths) and grandson of Iowa state senator Phineas M. Casady. He graduated from the University of Iowa with a Bachelor of Arts in 1902. In 1903 he entered General Theological Seminary and graduated in 1906. After he became bishop he received an honorary doctorate of sacred theology from General Seminary and an honorary doctorate of divinity from The University of the South, Sewanee, Tennessee.

== Career and family ==
He was ordained deacon on June 27, 1906 by Bishop Arthur Llewellyn Williams of Nebraska and priest on February 10, 1907 by Bishop M. Edward Fawcett of Quincy. He was initially a deacon at St Mary's Church in Oelwein, Iowa, and then became rector of St Mark's Church in Des Moines, Iowa. He also served as rector of Ascension Church in Pueblo, Colorado between 1912 and 1920 and then as rector of All Saints' Church in Omaha, Nebraska from 1920 to 1927.

On June 27, 1906, he married Frances LeBaron Kasson, a descendant of the colonial Massachusetts Governor William Bradford. They had six children: Simon Casady, Frances Cristabel Sherman, Reverend Phineas M. Casady, Reverend Mac Casady, Richard R. Casady, and Thomas Casady Jr.

== Episcopacy ==
Casady was elected by the House of Bishops to be the third Missionary Bishop of Oklahoma in June 1927. He was consecrated bishop on October 2, 1927, at All Saints' Church, Omaha, Nebraska with Presiding Bishop John Gardner Murray as chief consecrator. When the Diocese of Oklahoma was formed in 1938, Casady became its first diocesan bishop. The Casady School was founded by Bishop Casady and the Episcopal Diocese of Oklahoma in 1947. In 1953, the W. R. Chilton Powell succeeded Casady as bishop of the diocese.

== Consecrators ==
- John Gardner Murray, 16th presiding bishop of the Episcopal Church
- Theodore Nevin Morrison, 3rd bishop of Iowa
- George Allan Beecher, 2nd bishop of Kearney (The Platte)

Thomas Casady was the 355th bishop consecrated for the Episcopal Church.

== See also ==
- Historical list of bishops of the Episcopal Church in the United States of America
- Episcopal Diocese of Oklahoma

Episcopal Church (USA) titles
| Preceded by Theodore Payne Thurston | 3rd missionary bishop of Oklahoma; 1927 – 1937 | Succeeded by |
| Preceded by | 1st Bishop of Oklahoma; 1937 – 1953 | Succeeded by Chilton Powell |
