= Senator Cassidy (disambiguation) =

Bill Cassidy (born 1957) is a U.S. Senator from Louisiana since 2015. Senator Cassidy may also refer to:

- Bert Alford Cassidy (1889–1950), California State Senate
- George W. Cassidy (1836–1892), Nevada State Senate
- Owen Cassidy (c.1862–1911), New York State Senate
- Samuel H. Cassidy (born 1950), Colorado State Senate
- Thomas F. Cassidy (1875–1941), Massachusetts State Senate
- Vinton Cassidy (fl. 1970s–1990s), Maine State Senate

== See also ==
- Senator Casady (disambiguation)
