= George Temple (politician) =

American politician

George Temple (April 6, 1804 – January 23, 1878) was an American politician.

== Early life ==
Born on April 6, 1804, in Westmoreland, New Hampshire, Temple worked as a tailor and moved steadily westward in adulthood. He married Sarah F. Deaton on October 27, 1825, in Madison County, Illinois, and eventually settled in Burlington, Iowa, then in Wisconsin Territory, in 1836. His son Edward Temple was a prominent banker in Des Moines.

== Career ==
Politically, Temple was affiliated with the Democratic Party. After Iowa Territory was created, Temple held the District 1 seat in the Iowa Territorial House of Representatives, the lower house of the Iowa Legislative Assembly, from November 12, 1838, to November 3, 1839. Between December 2, 1850, and December 5, 1852, Temple returned to the Iowa legislature, reconstituted as the Iowa General Assembly, representing District 7 of the Iowa House of Representatives, and concurrently serving as speaker.

== Personal life ==
Temple died on January 23, 1878, in Ottumwa, Iowa.
