= Casady School =

Private school in Oklahoma City, Oklahoma, U.S.

Coordinates: 35.567584°N 97.549027°W

- Oklahoma City, Oklahoma; U.S.

Information
- Type: Private, day, college-preparatory
- Religious affiliation: Episcopal
- Established: 1947
- Locale: Suburban
- Head of School: Nathan L. Sheldon
- Grades: P–12
- Gender: Co-educational
- Enrollment: 1,020
- Student to teacher ratio: 8:1
- Colors: Navy, white and red
- Athletics conference: Oklahoma Secondary School Activities Association (OSSAA)
- Mascot: Cyclone
- Affiliations: ISAS; American Montessori Society; Southwestern Association of Episcopal Schools (SAES)
- Website: www.casady.org

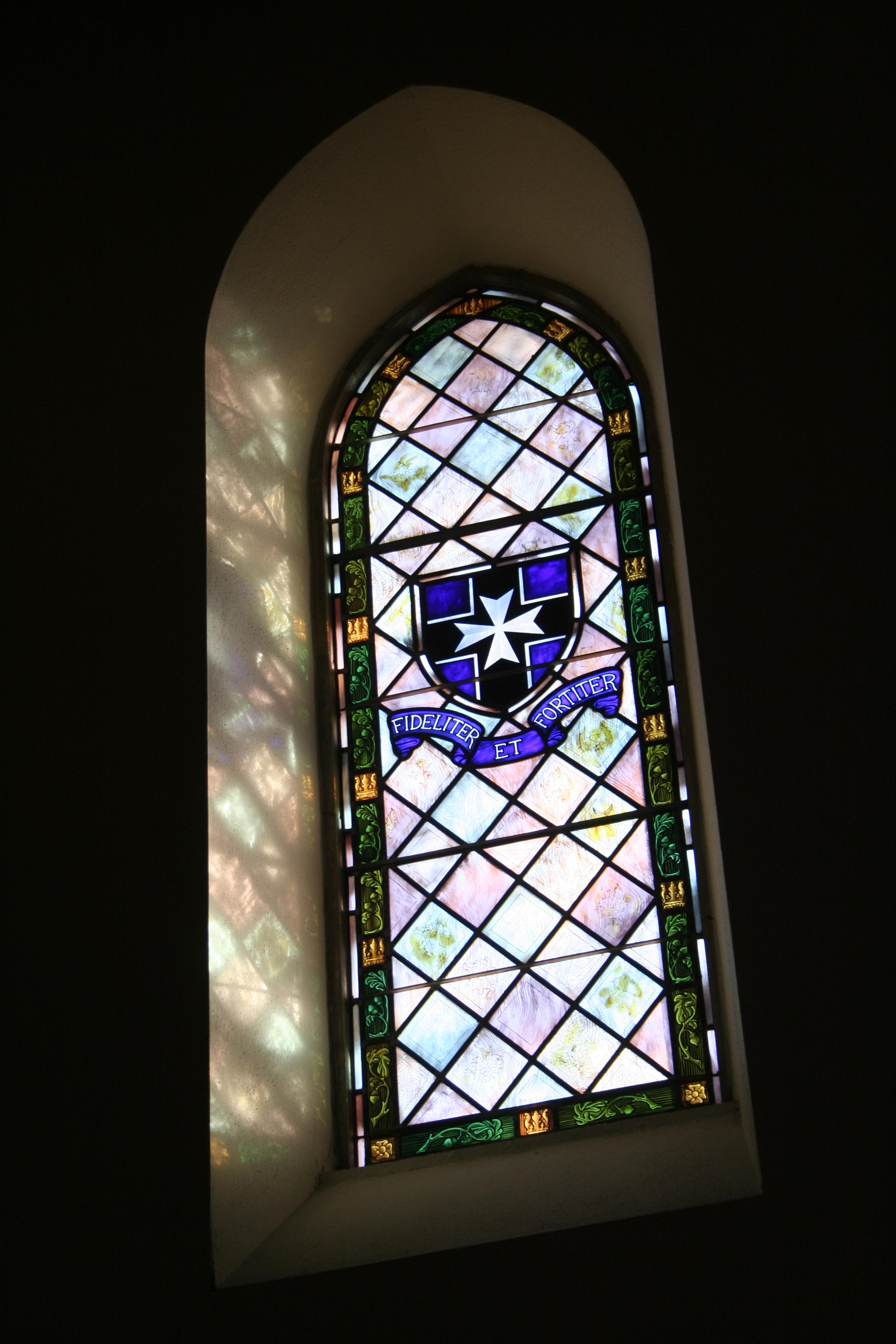
Casady School chapel window

Casady School is an independent, coeducational, college-preparatory school located in Oklahoma City, Oklahoma, founded in 1947 by Bishop Thomas Casady and the Episcopal Diocese of Oklahoma, and a group of businessmen. Casady serves children in grades pre-kindergarten through 12th grade and is accredited by the Independent Schools Association of the Southwest and the Southwestern Association of Episcopal Schools.

== History ==
The school is named in honor of Bishop Thomas Casady. Historically, many of Oklahoma City's elite families sent their children to the Casady School.

Casady Hall, as it was originally called began with the first meeting of its Board of Trustees on February 17, 1947. The 38-acre property, including a small lake, a house, and two barns had been donated. Senator A.S. (Mike) Monroney's Distinguished Congressional Award provided $10,000.

Casady Hall's first headmaster, the Reverend Michael Martin, was hired and Casady Hall opened in September 1947 with 36 students in grades seven through nine. The faculty of four, including the headmaster, taught the students in the remodeled pony stable, which was renamed Cochran Hall.

In 1948, the school was renamed Casady School.

The Chapel of St. Edward the Confessor was built in 1948. Frank J. Hightower, a founding Trustee of the school, donated the funds for its construction.

By 1965, the campus also included 12 more buildings, including the Headmaster's House and Calvert Hall. The Primary building was added in 1969. Fee Theater was completed in 1978. McClendon Middle School was completed in 2000. The W.R. Johnston Math Building was dedicated in 2010, and the Dr. John Records Arts and Science facility was completed in 2014. An expansion to the 1969 Primary Division building was started in 2022.

As of 2022, the campus comprises 80 acres and 29 buildings.

Casady School has had twelve headmasters: Stephen Gassaway who served when the school first opened, Michael Martin (1947–52), Shaun Kelly (1952–56), Howard Taber (1956–63), Dr. Robert B. Woolsey (1963–80), Richard B. McCubbin (1980–90), Barnaby J. Roberts (1990–98), Mark H. Mullin (1998–2002), Charles W. Britton (2002–07), David W. Gorham (Interim 2007–08), Christopher C. Bright (2008–14), and Nathan Sheldon (2014–present).

The school's 75th anniversary was celebrated throughout the 2022–2023 school year with several special events.

== Casady Community ==
Casady School, the oldest independent, coeducational, college preparatory, Episcopal day school in Oklahoma City, serves students PreK-12. Founded in 1947, Casady has grown to 1,020 students, 220 faculty and staff, more than 4,000 alumni, with an 80-acre campus holding 29 buildings. Casady is ranked the best private school for college preparedness and the best private K-12 school in Oklahoma by Niche

Casady hosts a chapter of the Cum Laude Society and adheres to a student-led Honor Code. Historically, 100 percent of Casady School graduates attend a four-year college or university.

== Enrollment and Accreditation ==
Casady enrolls approximately 1,020 students in PreK-12, 320 in the Upper Division (Grades 9-12). Students come from a wide geographical area. Casady School is accredited by the Independent Schools Association of the Southwest (ISAS) and the Southwestern Association of Episcopal Schools. Casady is a member of National Association of Independent Schools (NAIS), National Association of Episcopal Schools (NAES), National Association of College Admission Counseling (NACAC), and the Association of College Counselors in Independent Schools (ACCIS). Casady athletically competes in the Oklahoma Secondary School Activities Association in the majority of sports, the Southwest Preparatory Conference (SPC) for Field Hockey and Boys’ Volleyball, and the Catholic Grade School Athletic Association (CGSAA).

== Academics ==
The 78 graduates of the Class of 2020 earned $8,937,348 in scholarship monies. The Class of 2020 received 251 college acceptances to 112 different colleges and universities, including Georgetown University, United States Air Force Academy, Vanderbilt University, Wake Forest University, Colorado School of Mines, and many others. Many Casady graduates go on to post-secondary education.

Casady School is the only member in the State of Oklahoma of the Malone School Online Network (MSON), which offers a variety of superior online courses that enhance Casady's existing college preparatory curriculum. MSON courses use the Stanford University Online High School virtual seminar model and are taught by faculty from the other 19 Malone Schools currently participating in the Network. Each MSON course takes a blended approach and combines synchronous instruction (real-time video conference seminars) with asynchronous instruction (recorded lectures and exercises students complete outside of class). Representing a "virtual Harkness Model," each MSON course enrolls no more than 16 students, allowing for active, real-time discussion.

The Malone Family Foundation awarded Casady School with a $2 million scholarship endowment in May 2006. Created for students in grades seven through 12 who demonstrate outstanding abilities as well as financial need, the scholarship enables qualified young adults to benefit from an independent education.

=== Interdisciplinary Studies ===
In the Fall of 2021, Casady School introduced an Interdisciplinary Studies Program course, American Design The course is an inquiry-based and intrinsically-motivated, and boast five distinct features:

• Team-Taught Courses: The new eleventh grade Interdisciplinary Studies course is team-taught by both an English and History teacher.

• Dual Credit: Eleventh grade students receive both an English and History graduation credit on their transcript.

• Inquiry-Based Learning: Eleventh grade students explore in-depth topics related to “history and culture now” in a local context through project-and-problem-based learning.

• Public Presentations: Eleventh grade students complete collaborative projects that include community engagement and public presentations of their work.

•Capstone Projects: Qualified, self-selecting 12th grade students have the opportunity to apply for an independent project that includes working with a faculty member and/or an industry-based mentor.

Dr. Richard B. Hays of Duke University's Divinity School stated that,"Casady's new Interdisciplinary Studies program will seek to integrate study of the humanities with civic service. Historically speaking, that should not be surprising at all, but in our current environment, it sounds like a novel idea! I look forward to hearing more about this program's development towards producing graduates who are historically informed, intellectually reflective, and compassionately engaged civic servants.”

== Athletics ==
Casady students have the option to choose from 21 different sports that are offered during three seasons for the academic year. Casady School is a member of the Oklahoma Secondary School Activities Association for the majority of sports, the Southwest Preparatory Conference for Field Hockey and Boys’ Volleyball, and the Catholic Grade School Athletic Association.

Since 1956 Casady has won 154 SPC championships. Casady changed its affiliation for the majority of sports beginning from the SPC to the OSSAA with competitions in OSSAA beginning in the fall of 2023.

== Religion ==
Casady students attend services daily at the Chapel of St. Edward the Confessor. Built soon after the school was renamed Casady in 1948, the Chapel underwent a $2 million expansion in 2011.

== Notable alumni ==
- Clay Bennett - NBA Oklahoma City Thunder owner, Oklahoma City businessman
- J. Larry Nichols - Co-founder of Devon Energy
- Lance Rentzel - NFL football player Minnesota Vikings (1965-1966), Dallas Cowboys (1967-1970), Los Angeles Rams (1971-1974)
- Megan Mullally - American actress and singer
- Gray Frederickson - Academy Award winner film producer
- Emily Levan, elite marathon runner
