= St. Paul's Cathedral (Oklahoma City) =

Historic church in Oklahoma, United States

- U.S. National Register of Historic Places
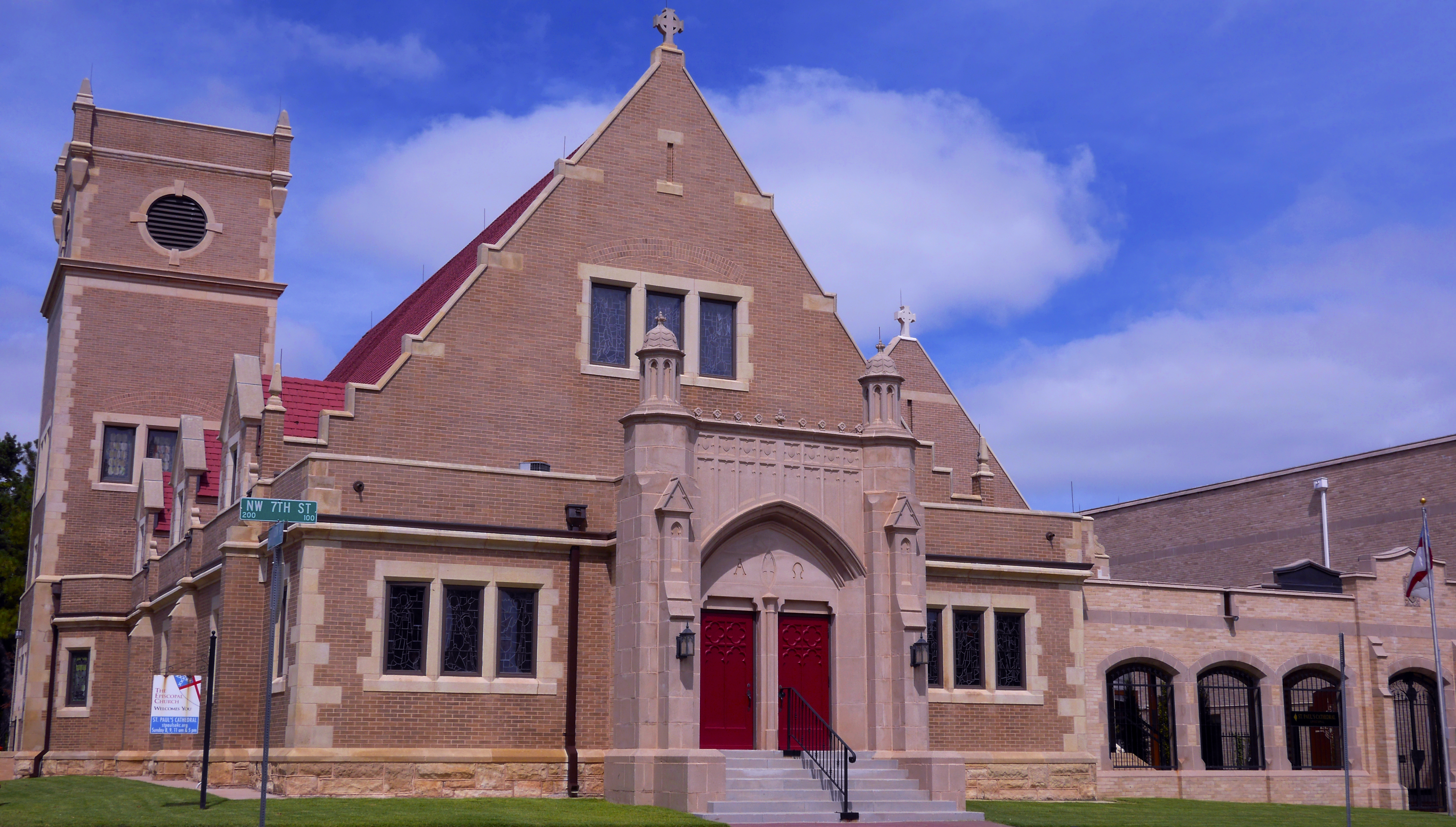

- Location within Oklahoma Location within the United States
- Location: 127 7th St., NW. Oklahoma City, Oklahoma
- Coordinates: 35°28′31″N 97°30′56″W
- Built: 1904
- Architect: Arthur J. Williams
- Architectural style: Norman Gothic
- NRHP reference No.: 77001096
- Added to NRHP: April 11, 1977

St. Paul's Cathedral is an historic church building located in Oklahoma City, Oklahoma, United States. It is the seat of the Episcopal Diocese of Oklahoma and it has been listed on the National Register of Historic Places since 1977. The cathedral reported 1,104 members in 2015 and 1,015 members in 2023. Plate and pledge income for the congregation in 2024 was $1,149,379 with average Sunday attendance (ASA) of 251. This was a relative increase from ASA of 347 reported in 2017.

== History ==
St. Paul's began as a mission in 1891. The congregation met in several locations including the federal courthouse. The first frame building for the congregation was built in 1893 and the mission was raised to parish status on May 14, 1902. The cornerstone for the present church was laid in 1903 and the first service in the building was held on March 13, 1904. The parish house was opened the same year. The Diocese of Oklahoma elected in January 1909 to make St. Paul's its Cathedral. The educational building was built in 1949.

St. Paul's Cathedral was extensively damaged when a bomb exploded at the nearby Alfred P. Murrah Federal Building on April 19, 1995. The Celtic Cross on top of the church was shattered. The roof was lifted and the walls were splayed outward. The cathedral was closed for two years while it was rebuilt. Additional property was purchased and a new facility to house offices and the parish's outreach programs was built. The total price for the renovations and expansion totaled $7.5 million.

== Architecture ==
Arthur J. Williams designed the church in the Norman Gothic style. The exterior features a Norman style tower. The interior has two Tiffany windows behind the altar. Stained glass windows on the Gospel side of the Church depict the Evangels: St. John, St. Paul and St. Luke. The windows on the Epistle side depict events from the life of Christ including the Nativity, Crucifixion and Resurrection. The altar, pulpit and the baptismal font are carved from Carrara marble.

== See also ==
- List of the Episcopal cathedrals of the United States
- List of cathedrals in the United States
