= Phineas M. Casady =

American politician

Phineas McCray Casady
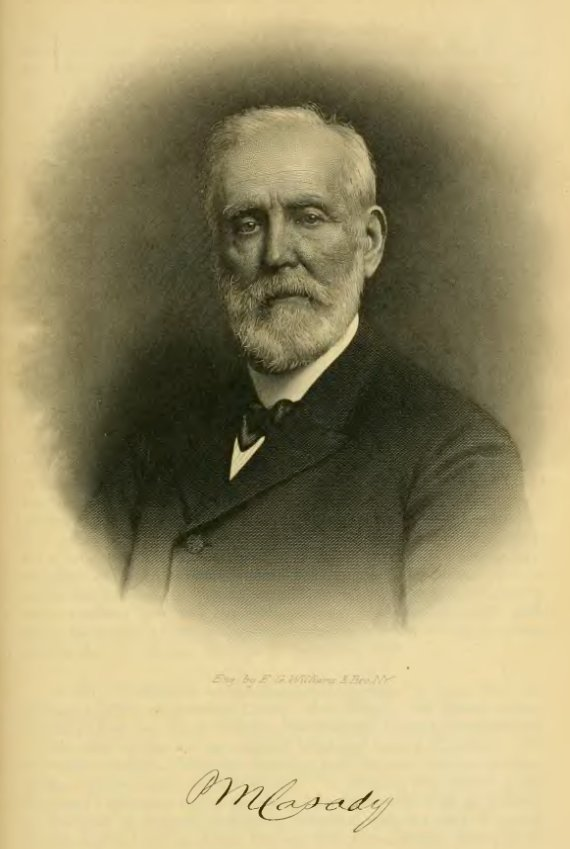

Member of the Iowa Senate from the 5th district
- In office December 4, 1848 – December 5, 1852
- Preceded by: Thomas Baker
- Succeeded by: Archibald McKinney

Personal details
- Born: December 3, 1818 Connersville, Fayette County,Indiana, US
- Died: August 31, 1908 (aged 90) Des Moines, Iowa, US
- Party: Democratic
- Spouse: Wilhelmina Augusta Grimmel
- Children: 5, including Simon
- Relatives: Jefferson P. Casady (brother), Samuel H. Casady (brother)
- Profession: Politician, lawyer, judge

Phineas McCray Casady (December 3, 1818 – September 2, 1908) was an American pioneer, judge, lawyer, and state senator in Iowa. Casady was one of the earliest white settlers of Pottawattamie County and a member of the influential Casady family who had a strong impact on the early history and legislation of Iowa. He was a Democrat.

== Early life ==
Born in Connersville, Indiana, Casady migrated to Iowa in 1847. He first traveled to Des Moines, then on to Indigenous Dakota land on the Western frontier. His brother Jefferson P. Casady also served as a judge, lawyer, and state senator. His son Simon was a prominent Des Moines banker. His brother Samuel H. Casady was a politician who served in the Iowa House of Representatives and fought as a Sergeant during the Sioux Wars as part of the Sioux City Cavalry.

== Death ==
Casady died on August 31, 1908. He is interred in the Casady family mausoleum at Woodland Cemetery in Des Moines, Iowa. Woodlawn Cemetery is the oldest cemetery in Des Moines. The first burial in the cemetery was in 1850 of Casady's one-year-old son Thomas Casady.

== Legacy ==
Casady was the first member and longtime Vice President of the Scotch-Irish Society of America and was responsible for the Society's sixth convention being held in Des Moines in 1894. In their proceedings, the Society praised Casady as "one of the pioneers of Iowa, going there in the days of the Indian and the buffalo" and who found "little difficulty inspiring others with his racial pride and enthusiasm."

The Casady School in Oklahoma City is named in honor of Phineas. The school was founded by his grandson Thomas Casady, an Episcopal bishop.

Iowa Senate
Preceded by Thomas Baker	5th District; 1848 – 1851	Succeeded by Archibald McKinney
