= Simon Casady =

American banker

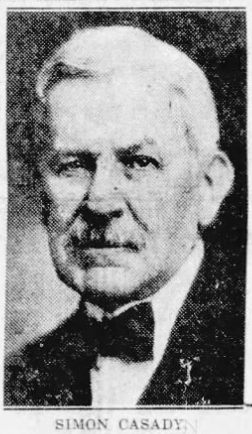
- Simon Casady in 1923.
- Born: May 16, 1852; Des Moines, Iowa, US
- Died: April 5, 1928 (aged 75)
- Occupation: Banker
- Known for: Organizing the Des Moines Savings Bank
- Spouses: Sarah Conarroe Griffiths Casady Jane (m. 1880)
- Children: 4 (Thomas Casady, Simon Casady Jr., Phillip Murray Casady, and Rose Conarroe Casady)

Simon Casady (June 16, 1852 – March 25, 1928) was a prominent banker in Iowa, best known for his role in organizing the Des Moines Bank, which later evolved into the Des Moines Savings Bank. Casady served as the president of the Des Moines Savings Bank and the Central State Bank, as well as the vice president of the Iowa National Bank and the treasurer of the Bankers Life Association. Casady has been referred to as "the dean of Iowa bankers" in news accounts. He was a member of the Casady family, an influential lineage of bankers, politicians, landowners, and farmers who played a significant role in the early history and legislative matters of Iowa.

== Life ==
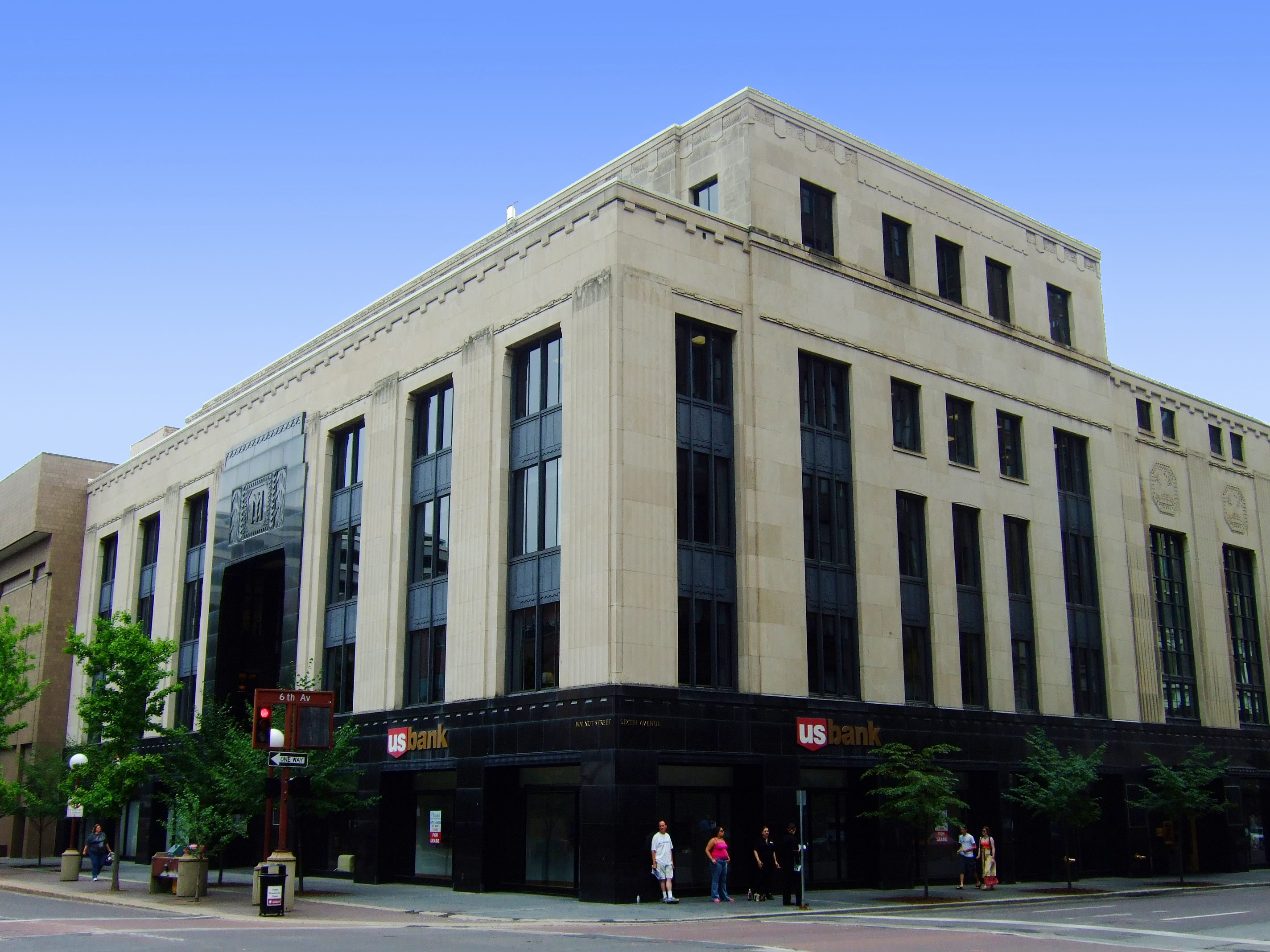
The Iowa-Des Moines National Bank Building purchased in 1909 by Casady, June 2009.

Born in Des Moines in 1852, at 314 Fifth Street, in a house that later became the site of the Central State Bank, where he would later serve as president, Simon Casady was the son of state senator and judge Phineas M. Casady and his wife Wilhelmina Augusta Grimmel. Judge Casady was an early pioneer settler in Iowa and held prominence in both city and state politics. On June 1, 1880, Casady and his wife, Sarah Conarroe Griffiths, became the first native-born settler couple to be married in Des Moines, having their wedding at the Cathedral Church of Saint Paul. A court case between Simon Casady and his brother Frank Casady, concerning inheritance from their father Phineas, known as Casady v. Casady, 184 Iowa 1241 (1918), was taken to the Iowa Supreme Court, which ruled in favor of Simon Casady.

In 1910, Casady purchased the former Des Moines Savings Bank building from H. McMillan for $25,000. Following his purchase of the building, Casady severed relations with the Des Moines Savings Bank.

Casady and his family resided in Rosebrae, a home situated on Prospect Boulevard in Des Moines. In 1920, a Casady family reunion commemorated the 40th wedding anniversary of Casady and Sarah, and notable attendees included Thomas Casady.

Simon Casady held membership in the Benevolent and Protective Order of Elks. He was also a founding member and treasurer of the Des Moines Club, which is now recognized as the Des Moines Embassy Club.

Simon's wife, Sarah, actively opposed the extension of women's suffrage. In January 1916, Sarah Casady established and led the Iowa branch of the National Association Opposed to Woman Suffrage (NAOWS). This organization primarily comprised middle to upper-class, college-educated Christian housewives.

Casady was a staunch supporter of prohibition in the United States.

Casady died at the age of 76 on March 25, 1928, following a lengthy illness due to heart problems. In the several years prior to his death, Casady was one of the wealthiest residents of Des Moines. Due to his contributions to Iowa business and politics, he received tributes from state governor John Hammill, Des Moines Mayor Fred H. Hunter, and local business leaders. Casady left behind an estate worth an estimated $167,424.

== Legacy ==
The Simon Casady Residence, built in 1905, is still standing and is located on 715 Hickman Road in Des Moines. The original address for the Simon Casady Residence was 715 Prospect Road, Des Moines.

Casady's descendants remained active in Iowa banking and agriculture. His son Simon Casady Jr. was a co-founder of Pioneer Hi Bred International and his grandson Simon Wheeler Casady III was a Pioneer director and secretary and on the board of directors of Central National Bancshares. Simon Wheeler Casady III's granddaughters are Bianca and Sierra Casady of the band CocoRosie.

== See also ==
- Iowa-Des Moines National Bank Building
