= Christ Church Anglican (Savannah, Georgia) =

Historic Anglican church in Savannah, Georgia, United States

Coordinates: 32°3′26″N 81°5′59″W

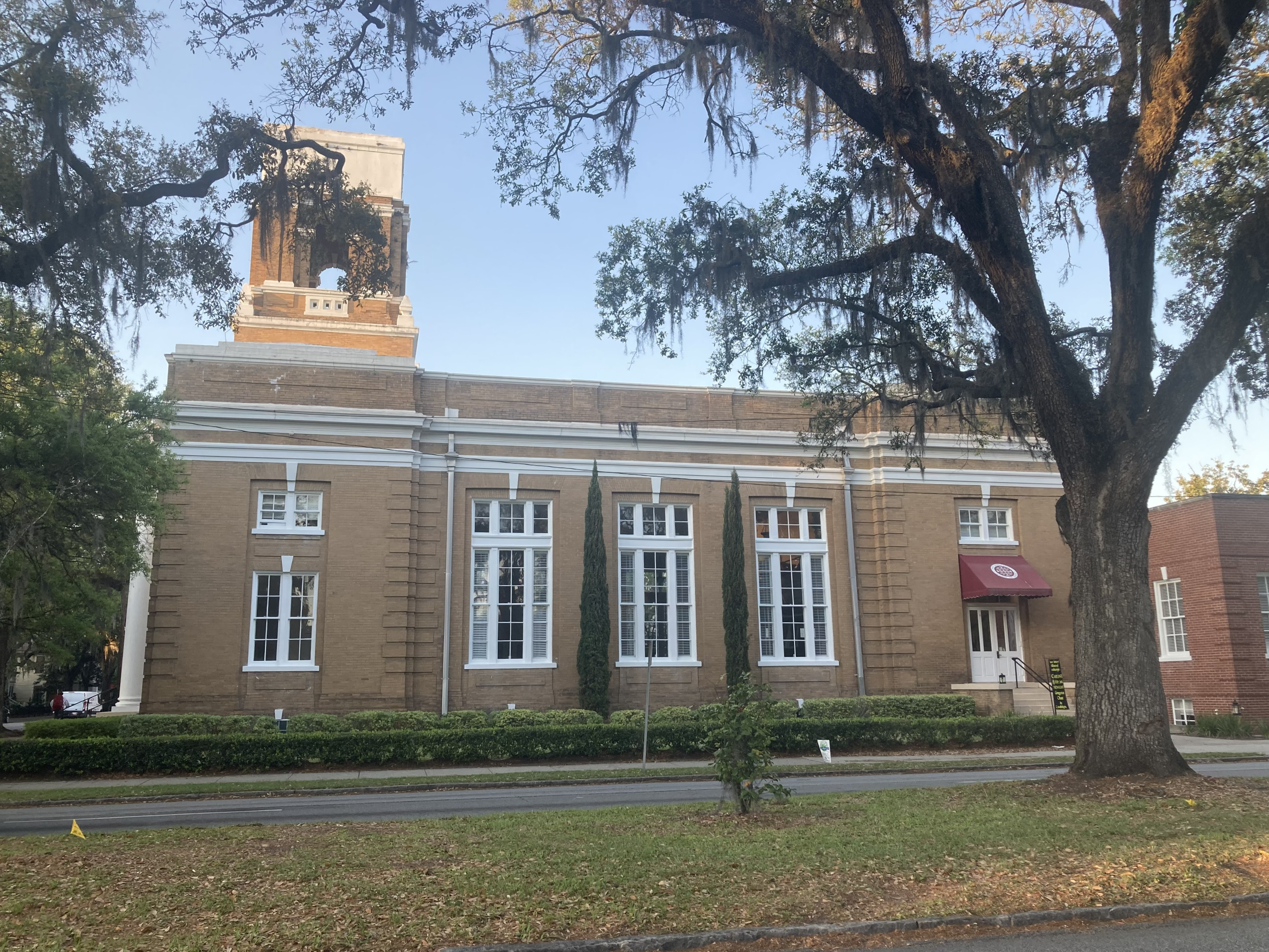
- Christ Church Anglican viewed from its 37th Street south side.
- Christ Church Anglican
- Location: Savannah, Georgia
- Country: United States
- Denomination: Anglican Church in North America
- Website: ccasav.org

History
- Founded: 1733
- Founder: Henry Herbert

Architecture
- Architect: Henrik Wallin
- Style: Georgian

Administration
- Diocese: Gulf Atlantic

Clergy
- Bishop: The Rt. Revd. Alex Farmer
- Rector: The Rev. Dr. Craig Stephans
- Hull Memorial Presbyterian Church
- U.S. Historic district – Contributing property
- Part of: Thomas Square Streetcar Historic District (ID97000813)
- Added to NRHP: July 29, 1997

Christ Church Anglican (CCA) is an Anglican parish in the Thomas Square neighborhood of Savannah, Georgia. It traces its history to 1733, when Christ Church was founded as the oldest Anglican presence in Georgia. In 2006, the majority of the clergy and parishioners of Christ Church departed from the Episcopal Diocese of Georgia; in 2012, after a loss in a court case, the congregation leaving the Episcopal Church relocated and renamed itself Christ Church Anglican. It is today part of the Gulf Atlantic Diocese in the Anglican Church in North America; its building is a contributing property to the Thomas Square Streetcar Historic District.

== History ==
=== Pre-schism history ===
On February 12, 1733, colonists from England established the city of Savannah as the first city in the newly chartered Province of Georgia. Henry Herbert, a priest in the Church of England, was with them, establishing a mission in the city under the auspices of the Bishop of London. While a lot for a church building had been plotted by James Oglethorpe, the first services for the parish were open air and, after its construction in 1736, held in the city's courthouse. Following Herbert's departure from Georgia in late 1733, several missionaries would serve in the new colony, most notably John Wesley, who served in the city from February 1736 to December of the following year. While there, Wesley founded one of the first Sunday schools in the United States and held services at his house (which he would later cite as being an important moment in the creation of the Methodist movement), but difficulties in evangelizing the Native Americans in the region and friction between Wesley and residents of the city led to his departure less than two years later.

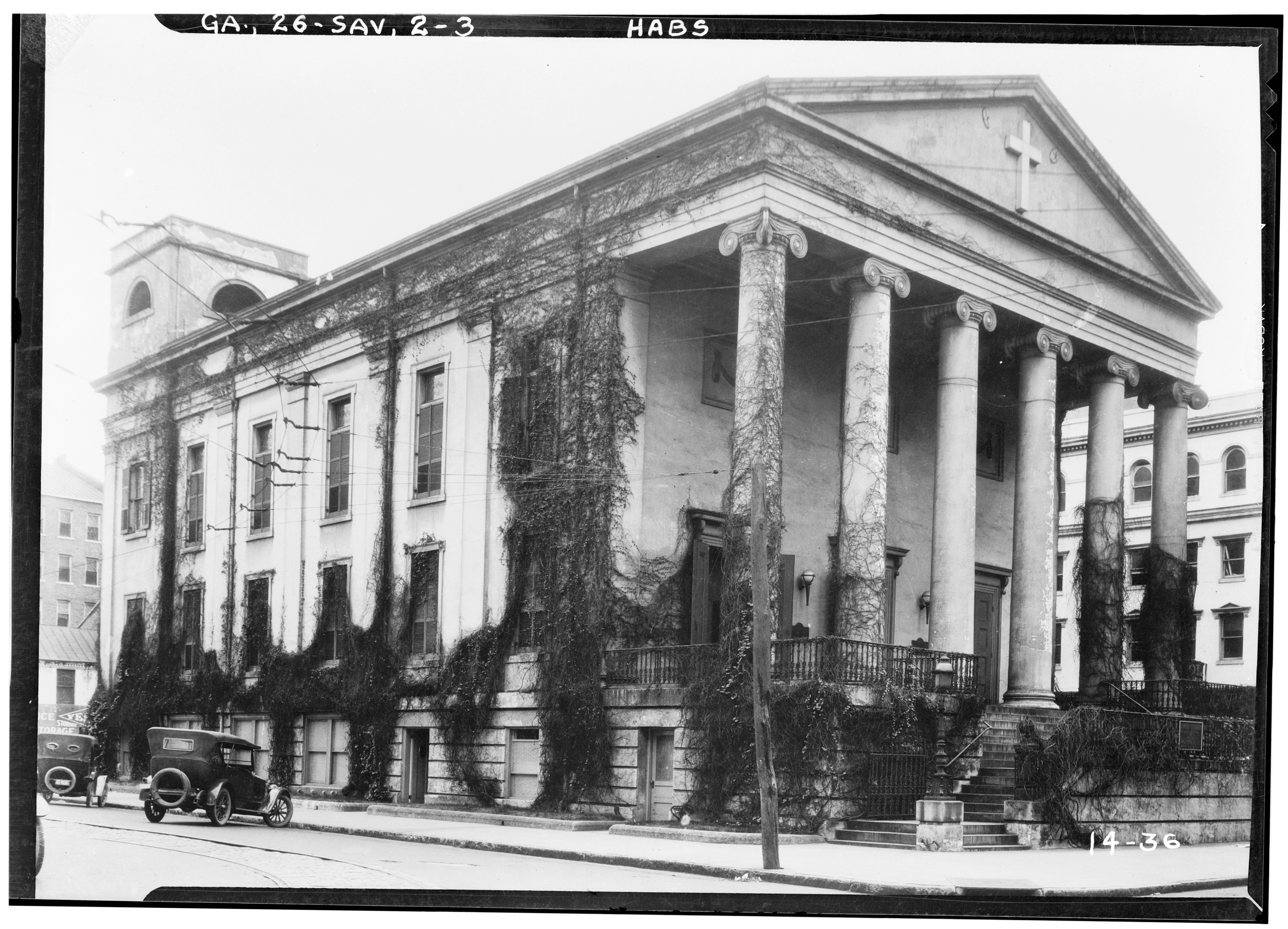
Historic American Buildings Survey picture of Christ Church (1934).

Following Wesley, George Whitefield would become the parish priest starting on December 1738. During his time in the colony, he founded the Bethesda Orphanage near Savannah in 1740. Shortly after Whitefield's tenure, in 1744, the cornerstone for the first permanent building for Christ Church was laid. The building was completed in 1750 and dedicated on July 7 of that year. In 1760, it received what was possibly the first organ in the province. The building was later expanded in 1765. This original church building burned down in 1796, with construction on a new building, designed by Adrian Boucher, starting in 1801 and ending in 1806. This rebuilt building was consecrated by Bishop Theodore Dehon of South Carolina on April 26, 1815 in what was the first visit of a bishop to Georgia. On February 24, 1823, Christ Church became one of the three original parishes of the Episcopal Diocese of Georgia, along with Christ Church on St. Simon's Island and Saint Paul's Church in Augusta, Georgia. On February 26, 1838, construction began on a new building at the same location, which stands today as the current church building. This building, located on Johnson Square in the Savannah Historic District, was designed by James Hamilton Couper, a noted planter from the state. It was consecrated in 1840. During the mid-1800s, the rector was Stephen Elliott, the first bishop of the Diocese of Georgia and the only presiding bishop of the Protestant Episcopal Church in the Confederate States of America. On January 8, 1854, Thomas Fielding Scott was consecrated bishop at Christ Church.

In 2006, the church found itself in conflict with the Episcopal Church's stance on a number of theological and moral issues, including the Church's stance on homosexuality. In March 2006, over 90% of the active members of the congregation of Christ Church voted to break ties with the Episcopal Church. Following a September 2007 vote to leave the Episcopal Diocese of Georgia, the congregation continued to hold services at the historic church building while parishioners who wished to remain with the Episcopal Church met at another nearby Episcopal church. The congregation was legally evicted from the historic building in December 2011 and began holding services at Independent Presbyterian Church. This was after the Supreme Court of Georgia ruled that the historic building was the property of the Episcopal Diocese of Georgia. The case also ruled that the church held the rights to the titles, "Christ Church, Savannah" and "the Mother Church of Georgia", with the departing congregation taking the name "Christ Church Anglican" to differentiate from the Episcopal congregation (sometimes referred to as "Christ Church Episcopal"). Both churches maintain the same history from 1733 to the split.

Copied content from Christ Church (Savannah, Georgia); see that page's history for attribution

=== History of CCA's present building ===
In 2015, after three years of sharing space with Independent Presbyterian Church, CCA moved into a permanent church building at 2020 Bull Street. The brick, Georgian-style building was originally built in 1913 for the Hull Memorial Presbyterian Church, a congregation of the Presbyterian Church in the United States, a forerunner of the Presbyterian Church (USA). That congregation had been party to litigation with its own denomination. In 1966, Hull Presbyterian's session voted to secede from the Presbytery of Savannah over objections to the ordination of women, social issues, the embrace of neo-orthodoxy and the PCUS' membership in the National Council of Churches.

The presbytery sought to block the departure and Hull and another seceding church sued in Chatham County court to enjoin presbytery representatives from trespassing; the presbytery filed a cross-claim that the state had no authority to determine whether the general church had departed from its tenets of faith and practice. The trial court and the Supreme Court of Georgia found for Hull and the other departing church.

By a unanimous decision in January 1969, the U.S. Supreme Court upheld the Georgia Supreme Court's decision that Hull Presbyterian rightfully owned its property, holding that the First Amendment bars the state from passing judgment in theological matters when judging property disputes involving religious organizations. The decision triggered the departure of numerous congregations from the PCUS, including Hull Presbyterian, to form the Presbyterian Church in America in 1973. Many denominations responded to this case and the later case of Jones v. Wolf by adding trust provisions to their national policies―including the Episcopal Church's Dennis Canon in 1979, which prevented CCA and most other breakaway Anglican churches and dioceses from retaining their property decades later.

Founded in 1868 as a mission of Independent Presbyterian Church, Hull Presbyterian continued a long decline in membership that started in the 1940s and was dissolved in 1990. Its building then became home to a predominantly African-American church called the Christian Revival Center. CCA's fellowship hall is named Hebron Hall in honor of the late Rev. Freddie Hebron, pastor of the Christian Revival Center.

== Programs ==
CCA established the Whitefield Center near its present-day location on land set aside for potential church construction. The Whitefield Center—co-founded by former Savannah mayor Floyd Adams Jr.—engages in neighborhood outreach through after-school tutoring, adult literacy programs, financial literacy programs, summer camps, and senior advocacy. The center also hosts the Grace Ashtin School for Girls and the Savannah chapter of Alpha Phi Alpha, and it partners with Urban Hope, Bethesda Academy, the Georgia Infirmary, Step Up Savannah, Savannah Technical College, and Young Life.

== Bibliography ==
- Brimmer, Adam Van (April 26, 2013). "Christ Church Anglican faces new opposition". Savannah Morning News. Morris Communications.
- Byrnside, Ron (1997). Music in Eighteenth-century Georgia. University of Georgia Press. ISBN 978-0-8203-1853-0 – via Google Books.
- Goodman, Brenda (December 5, 2007). ""A Church Is Divided, and Headed for Court"".
- Knight, Lucian Lamar (2006). Georgia's Landmarks, Memorials, and Legends. 1. Vol. 1. Pelican Publishing. pp. 77–79. ISBN 978-1-4556-0481-4 – via Google Books.
- Lawrence, James B. (1920). Burleson, Hugh L. (ed.). How Our Church Came to Our Country: A Series of Illustrated Papers. Morehouse Publishing Company. pp. 73–80 – via Google Books.
- Onofrio, Jan (1999). Oregon Biographical Dictionary. Somerset Publishers, Inc. ISBN 978-0-403-09841-5 – via Google Books.
- "Christ Church Episcopal unveils seal". Savannah Morning News. Morris Communications. January 21, 2010.
- Skutch, Jan (May 3, 2012). "Christ Church case settles, ending almost five-year discord". Savannah Morning News. Morris Communications.
- Williams, David S. (2008). From Mounds to Megachurches: Georgia's Religious Heritage. University of Georgia Press. ISBN 978-0-8203-3638-1 – via Google Books.
