= Christ Church (Savannah, Georgia) =

- Christ Church Episcopal; Christ Church Savannah
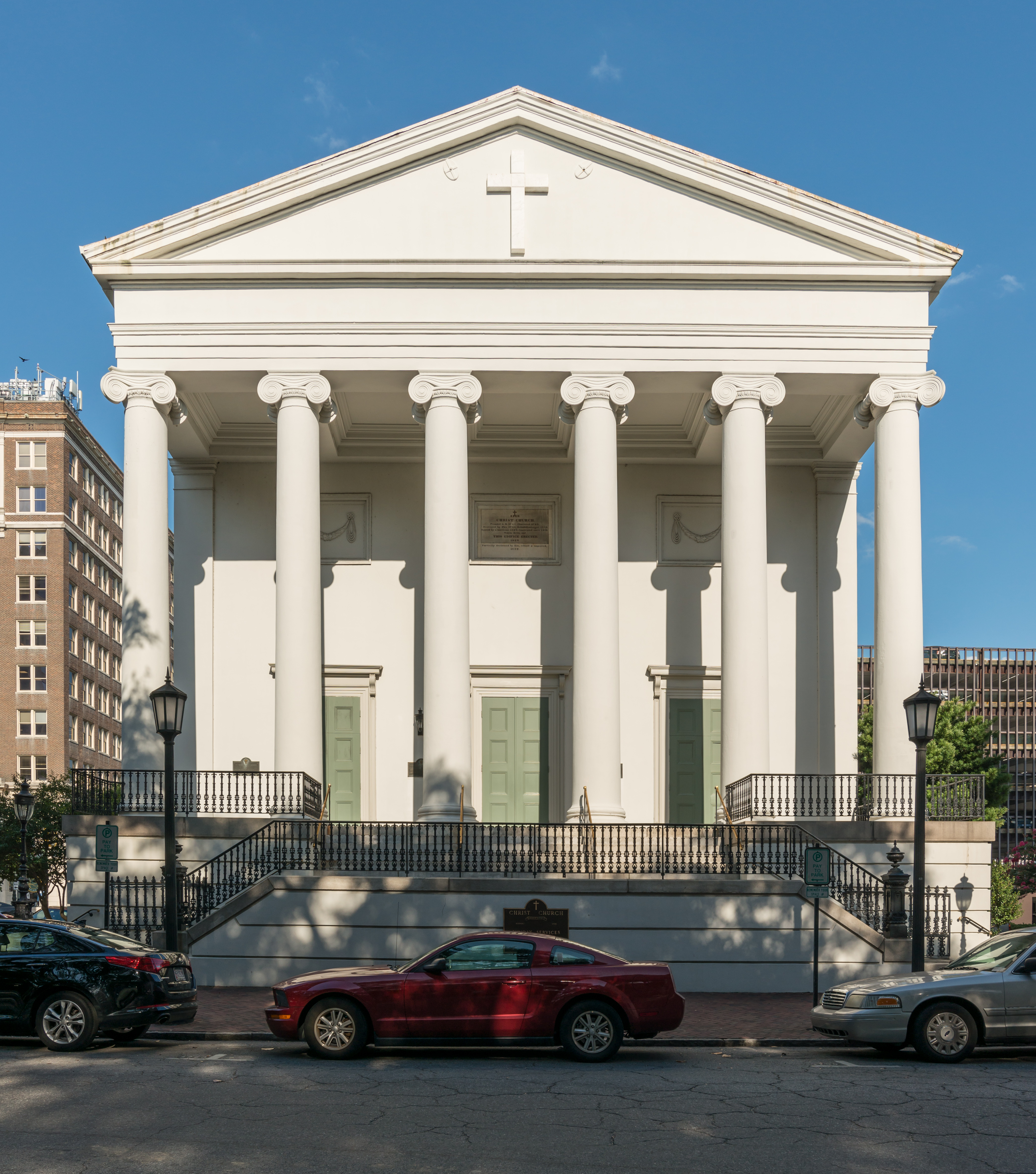
- The church in 2016
- Christ Church
- 32°4′46.3″N 81°5′26.8″W
- Location: 28 Bull Street; Savannah, Georgia
- Country: United States
- Denomination: Episcopal Church
- Previous denomination: Protestant Episcopal Church in the Confederate States of America (1861–1865)
- Website: christchurchsavannah.org

History
- Founded: February 12, 1733
- Consecrated: July 7, 1750 (first building); April 26, 1815 (second building); 1840 (current building)

Architecture
- Architect: James Hamilton Couper (current building)
- Groundbreaking: 1744 (first building); 1801 (second building); February 26, 1838 (current building)
- Completed: 1750 (first building); 1806 (second building); 1838 (current building)
- Demolished: 1796 (first building); 1838 (second building)

Administration
- Province: Province IV
- Diocese: Episcopal Diocese of Georgia

Clergy
- Bishop: The Rt. Rev. Frank S. Logue
- Rector: The Rev. Andrew M. Harmon
- Christ Church Episcopal
- U.S. National Historic Landmark District – Contributing property
- Part of: Savannah Historic District (ID66000277)
- Added to NRHP: November 13, 1966

Christ Church is an Episcopal church at 28 Bull Street, Johnson Square, in Savannah, Georgia. Founded in 1733, it was the first church established in the Province of Georgia and one of the first parishes within the Episcopal Diocese of Georgia, earning it the nickname "the Mother Church of Georgia". The present church building was constructed in 1838 and is located in the Savannah Historic District.

In 2015, the church reported 452 members; in 2023, it reported 703 members. No membership statistics were reported in 2024 national parochial reports. Plate and pledge financial support reported by the church in 2024 was $1,032,496. Average Sunday Attendance (ASA) reported in 2024 was 226 persons. This was a relative decrease on ASA of 246 in 2020.

== History ==
On February 12, 1733, colonists from England established the city of Savannah as the first city in the newly chartered Province of Georgia. Henry Herbert, a priest in the Church of England, was with them, establishing a mission in the city under the auspices of the Bishop of London. While a lot for a church building had been plotted by James Oglethorpe, the first services for the parish were open air and, after its construction in 1736, held in the city's courthouse. Following Herbert's departure from Georgia in late 1733, several missionaries would serve in the new colony, most notably John Wesley, who served in the city from February 1736 to December of the following year. While there, Wesley founded one of the first Sunday schools in the United States and held services at his house (which he would later cite as being an important moment in the creation of the Methodist movement), but difficulties in evangelizing the Native Americans in the region and friction between Wesley and residents of the city led to his departure less than two years later.

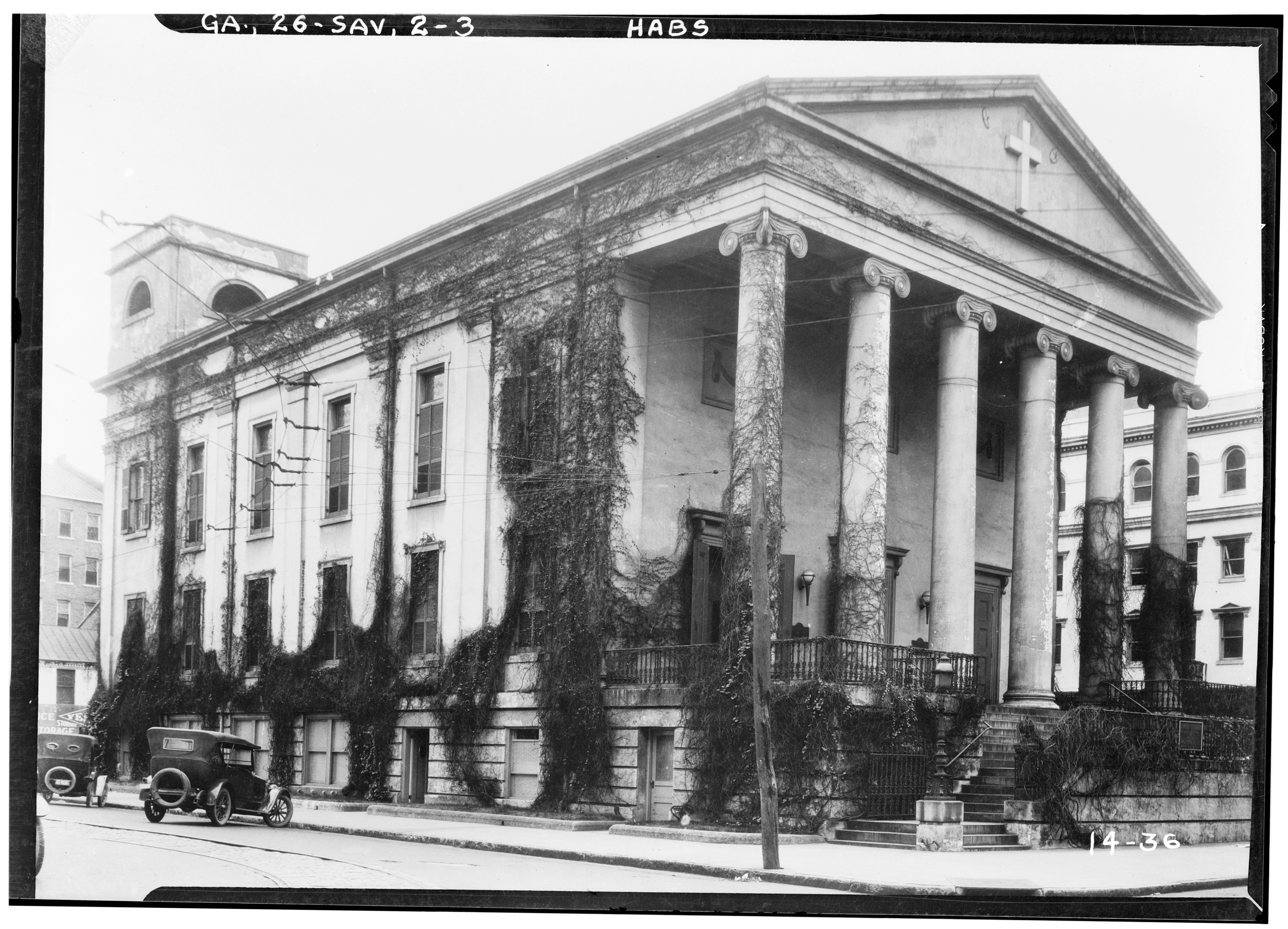
Historic American Buildings Survey picture of Christ Church (1934).

Following Wesley, George Whitefield would become the parish priest starting on December 1738. During his time in the colony, he founded the Bethesda Orphanage near Savannah in 1740. Shortly after Whitefield's tenure, in 1744, the cornerstone for the first permanent building for Christ Church was laid. The building was completed in 1750 and dedicated on July 7 of that year. In 1760, it received what was possibly the first organ in the province. The building was later expanded in 1765. This original church building burned down in 1796, with construction on a new building, designed by Adrian Boucher, starting in 1801 and ending in 1806. This rebuilt building was consecrated by Bishop Theodore Dehon of South Carolina on April 26, 1815, in what was the first visit of a bishop to Georgia. On February 24, 1823, Christ Church became one of the three original parishes of the Episcopal Diocese of Georgia, along with Christ Church on St. Simon's Island and Saint Paul's Church in Augusta, Georgia. On February 26, 1838, construction began on a new building at the same location, which stands today as the current church building. This building, located on Johnson Square in the Savannah Historic District, was designed by James Hamilton Couper, a noted planter from the state, with Amos Scudder being responsible for the brickwork and Gilbert Butler for the woodwork. It was consecrated in 1840. During the mid-1800s, the rector was Stephen Elliott, the first bishop of the Diocese of Georgia and the only presiding bishop of the Protestant Episcopal Church in the Confederate States of America. On January 8, 1854, Thomas Fielding Scott was consecrated bishop at Christ Church.

In 2006, the church underwent a schism regarding the Episcopal Church's stance on homosexuality. In March 2006, a majority of the congregation of Christ Church voted to break ties with the Episcopal Church. Following a September 2007 vote to leave the Episcopal Diocese of Georgia, this breakaway group continued to hold services at the historic church building while parishioners who wished to remain with the Episcopal Church met at another nearby Episcopal church. The breakaway group vacated the historic building in December 2011 and began holding services at Independent Presbyterian Church. This was after the Supreme Court of Georgia ruled that the historic building was the property of Christ Church and the Episcopal Diocese of Georgia. The case also ruled that the church held the rights to "Christ Church, Savannah" and "the Mother Church of Georgia", with the breakaway group taking the name "Christ Church Anglican" to differentiate from the Episcopal congregation (sometimes referred to as "Christ Church Episcopal"). Both churches maintain the same history from 1733 to the split.

In 2010, Christ Church Episcopal unveiled a new seal designed by local artist Louise Huntington Shipps, wife of Bishop Harry W. Shipps.

== Timeline of notable events ==
- 1733 - On February 12, the Colony of Georgia and Christ Church, a mission of the Church of England under the ecclesiastical authority of the Bishop of London, are founded.
- 1736 - The Rev. John Wesley becomes the minister. While here, he starts America's first Sunday school and publishes the first English hymnal for use in America.
- 1738 - The Rev. George Whitefield becomes the minister.
- 1740 - Mr. Whitefield lays the cornerstone for Bethesda Orphanage.
- 1744 - Cornerstone of the first Christ Church building is laid by Mr. Bosomworth.
- 1750 - The first church building is dedicated.
- 1750 - On July 7, a black woman is baptized at Christ Church. It is believed to be the first baptism of a black person in Savannah.
- 1758 - The cemetery, now known as Colonial Park, is vested in Christ Church.
- 1796 - The church building is burned in the great fire which destroys most of the city.
- 1803 - The second church building is begun.
- 1804 - A great hurricane destroys the unfinished second building.
- 1815 - The second church building is consecrated.
- 1823 - The Diocese of Georgia is formed and Christ Church is one of the three founding parishes.
- 1837 - The second church building is pulled down.
- 1840 - The third and present church building is consecrated.
- 1841 - The first Bishop of Georgia, the Rt. Rev. Stephen Elliott, is consecrated in Christ Church.
- 1841 - The parish is divided. All families south of Oglethorpe Avenue will be in a new parish to be known as "St. John's."
- 1908 - Frederick F. Reese is consecrated the fourth Bishop of Georgia in Christ Church.
- 1927 - Juliette Gordon Low, founder of the Girl Scouts of the USA, dies and is buried from Christ Church, her home parish.
- 1964 - Henry I. Louttit, Jr. ninth Bishop of Georgia, is ordained to the Sacred Order of Priests at Christ Church by the Right Rev. Albert Rhett Stuart.
- 1968 - City-wide memorial service held in memory of the Rev. Martin Luther King, Jr at Christ Church.
- 1969 - G. Paul Reeves is consecrated Bishop Coadjutor of Georgia in Christ Church.
- 1973 - The funeral of Albert Rhett Stuart, sixth Bishop of Georgia, is held on Holy Saturday at Christ Church.
- 1973 - The Bishop of London attends the Sesquicentennial of the Diocese of Georgia and dedicates the new organ at Christ Church.
- 1976 - Johnny Mercer, American songwriter and winner of four Academy Awards, dies and is buried from Christ Church.
- 1980 - The Rev. Charles L. Hoskins, then Rector of St. Matthew's Episcopal Church, Savannah, and author of Black Episcopalians in Georgia: Strife, Struggle, and Salvation, baptizes ten children at Christ Church on July 7 using the same rite of baptism from 1750.
- 1984 - Harry W. Shipps is consecrated Bishop Coadjutor of Georgia on the Feast of the Epiphany in Christ Church.
- 1984 - Francis Bland Tucker, thirty-seventh Rector, dies and is buried from Christ Church.
- 1985 - Susan W. Harrison is ordained to the Sacred Order of Deacons, the first woman to hold this position in the Diocese of Georgia, by the Rt. Rev. Harry W. Shipps.
- 1998 - Roger K. Warlick, author of As Grain Once Scattered: The History of Christ Church, Savannah, Georgia, 1733-1983, dies and is buried in Christ Church.
- 2001 - Malcolm R. Maclean, Mayor of Savannah from 1960-66 and former Diocesan Chancellor, dies and is buried in Christ Church.
- 2007 - On September 30, the rector, vestry, and several members of Christ Church vote to disaffiliate from the Episcopal Church and align with the Church of Uganda, but they refuse to relinquish the real and personal property of Christ Church. The Rt. Rev. Henry I. Louttit defrocks the rector and appoints the Rev. Canon H. Neal Phelps as the priest in charge for the remaining Episcopalians who must now worship at St. Michael and All Angel's Episcopal Church on Washington Avenue.
- 2007 - The Diocese of Georgia, the Episcopal Church, and Christ Church Episcopal file a lawsuit in the Superior Court of Chatham County to regain control of the Christ Church property.
- 2008 - On July 1, Michael S. White becomes Christ Church's forty-first Rector. The Rev. Stuart Kenworthy, rector of Christ Church, Georgetown, Washington, D.C., is the preacher.
- 2008 - Katherine Jefferts Schori, Presiding Bishop and Primate, The Episcopal Church, preaches and celebrates at Christ Church Episcopal (worshiping at St. Michael and All Angel's Episcopal Church) on September 14, Holy Cross Day.
- 2011 - On November 21, the Georgia Supreme Court rules 6-1 that all real and personal property of Christ Church is held in trust for the Episcopal Church and the Diocese of Georgia as provided for in the Constitution and Canons of the Church and the Diocese. On December 18, the Fourth Sunday of Advent, the Episcopalians hold their first service in Christ Church since being forced to leave on September 30, 2007.
- 2012 - On February 18, the Rev. Julia Sierra Reyes is ordained to the priesthood at Christ Church by The Rt. Rev. Scott Anson Benhase, the tenth Bishop of Georgia. Reyes becomes the first woman and the first African-American priest in the history of the parish.
- 2012 - On May 29, the President of the United States, Barack Obama, posthumously awards the presidential Medal of Freedom to Juliette Gordon Low to honor her founding the Girl Scouts in 1912. Dick Platt, “Daisy” Low’s great nephew and member of the parish, accepts the award on her behalf.
- 2020 - On May 30, the Rt. Rev. Frank Logue was ordained and consecrated as the 11th Bishop of the Diocese of Georgia at Christ Church. The Rt. Rev. Scott Benhase, 10th bishop of Georgia served as the chief consecrator. The Rev. Julia Sierra Reyes was the preacher.

== Rectors ==
- Henry Herbert (1733)
- Samuel Quincy (1733-35)
- John Wesley (1736-37)
- George Whitefield (1738, 1739-40)
- William Norris (1738-39)
- William Metcalf (1740, appointed but died before he could depart England for Georgia)
- Christopher Orton (1741-42)
- Thomas Bosomworth (1744-45)
- Bartholomew Zouberbuhler (1745-66)
- Samuel Frink (1767-71)
- Timothy Lowten (1771-73)
- Haddon Smith (1773-75)
- John Rennie (1776)
- Edward Jenkins (1779-80)
- James Brown (1780-81)
- John Stewart (1781-82)
- John Holmes (1783?-84)
- William Nixon (1786-87)
- Benjamin Lindsay (1787-92?)
- Edward Ellington (1793-95)
- William Best (1804-07)
- John Bartow (1810-14)
- Walter Cranston (1815-22)
- Abiel Carter (1822-27)
- Edward Neufville (1827-51)
- Abram Beech Carter (1851-52)
- Stephen Elliott (1852-59, 1861-66)
- L.P. Balch (1860)
- Charles H. Coley (1867-68, having served also as Bishop Elliott's assistant since 1861)
- John M. Mitchell (1868-72)
- John W. Beckwith (1873-74)
- George D.E. Mortimer (1874-77)
- Thomas Boone (1877-88)
- Robb White (1889-1905)
- Francis Brown (1906-14)
- John Durham Wing (1915-23)
- David Cady Wright (1924-44)
- Francis Bland Tucker (1945-67)
- Warren E. Haynes (1967-73)
- George M. Maxwell (1973-90)
- Marcus B. Robertson (1992-2006)
- Michael S. White (2008-2024)
- Andrew M. Harmon (2026-present)

== See also ==
- National Register of Historic Places listings in Chatham County, Georgia
- Episcopal Diocese of Georgia
- Anglican realignment

== Bibliography ==
- Brimmer, Adam Van (April 26, 2013). "Christ Church Anglican faces new opposition". Savannah Morning News. Morris Communications.
- Byrnside, Ron (1997). Music in Eighteenth-century Georgia. University of Georgia Press. ISBN 978-0-8203-1853-0 – via Google Books.
- Goodman, Brenda (December 5, 2007). ""A Church Is Divided, and Headed for Court"". The New York Times.
- Knight, Lucian Lamar (2006). Georgia's Landmarks, Memorials, and Legends. 1. Vol. 1. Pelican Publishing. pp. 77–79. ISBN 978-1-4556-0481-4 – via Google Books.
- Lawrence, James B. (1920). Burleson, Hugh L. (ed.). How Our Church Came to Our Country: A Series of Illustrated Papers. Morehouse Publishing Company. pp. 73–80 – via Google Books.
- Onofrio, Jan (1999). Oregon Biographical Dictionary. Somerset Publishers, Inc. ISBN 978-0-403-09841-5 – via Google Books.
- "Christ Church Episcopal unveils seal". Savannah Morning News. Morris Communications. January 21, 2010.
- Skutch, Jan (May 3, 2012). "Christ Church case settles, ending almost five-year discord". Savannah Morning News. Morris Communications.
- Williams, David S. (2008). From Mounds to Megachurches: Georgia's Religious Heritage. University of Georgia Press. ISBN 978-0-8203-3638-1 – via Google Books.
