= St. Luke's Episcopal Church (Atlanta) =

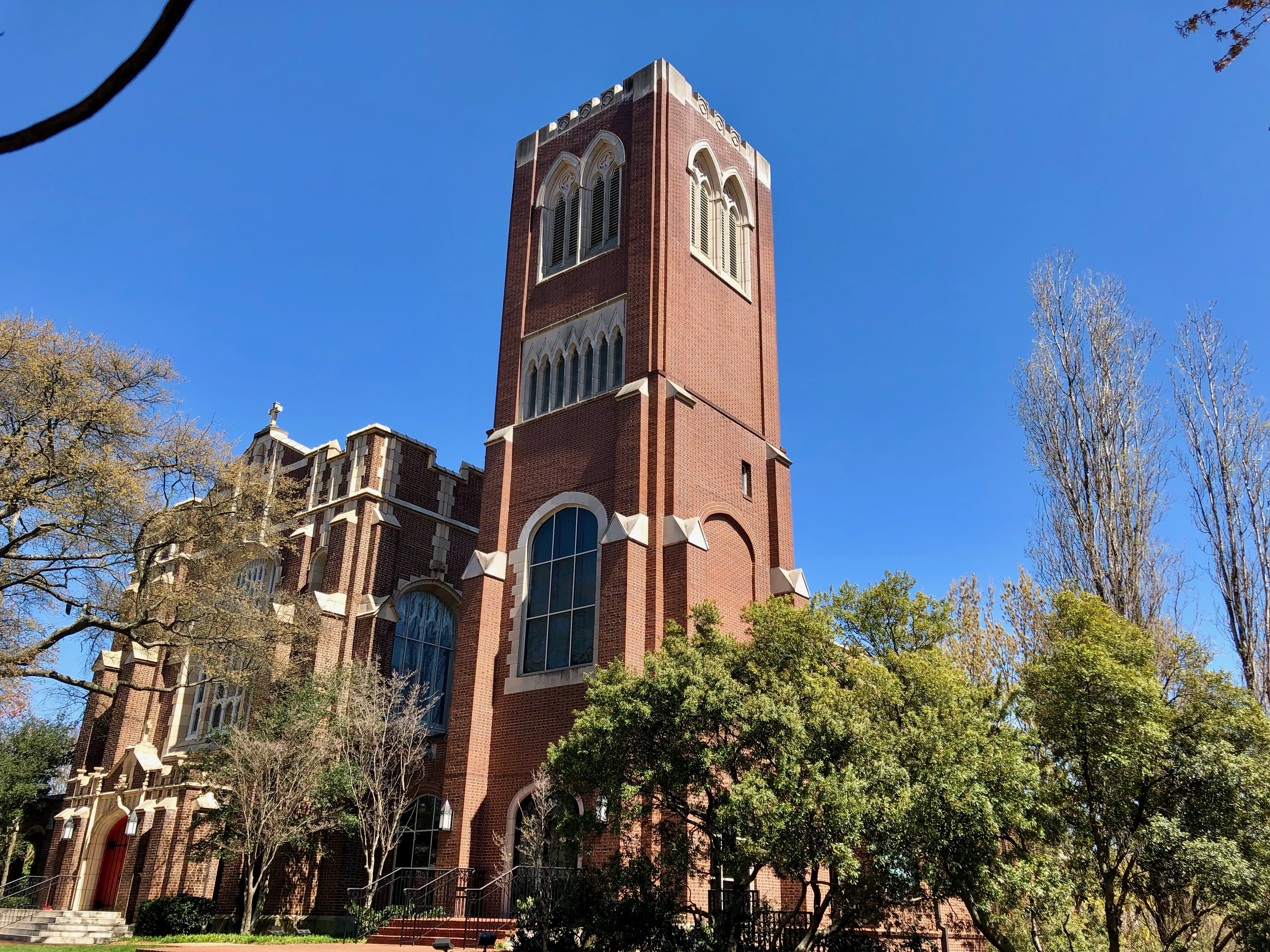
- St. Luke's Episcopal Church (2019)
- St. Luke's Episcopal Church
- 33°45′59″N 84°23′5″W
- Location: 435 Peachtree Street NE; Atlanta, Georgia 30308
- Country: United States
- Denomination: Episcopal Church
- Previous denomination: Protestant Episcopal Church in the Confederate States of America (1864)
- Website: www.stlukesatlanta.org

History
- Former name: St. Stephen's Episcopal Church (1870–1872)
- Founded: March 28, 1864
- Consecrated: April 22, 1864 (first building); 1906 (current building)

Architecture
- Architect(s): P. Thornton Marye (current building); A. Ten Eyck Brown (current building)
- Architectural type: Gothic
- Completed: 1864 (first building); 1875 (second building); 1883 (third building); 1906 (current building)
- Construction cost: $12,000 (first building)

Administration
- Province: Province IV
- Diocese: Episcopal Diocese of Atlanta

St. Luke's Episcopal Church is an Episcopal church in Atlanta, Georgia. The parish was founded in 1864, with the current building on Peachtree Street constructed in 1906.

In 2016, the church reported 1,952 members; in 2023, it reported 1,739 members. No membership statistics were reported in 2024 national parochial reports. Plate and pledge financial support reported by the church in 2024 was $2,232,777. Average Sunday Attendance (ASA) reported in 2024 was 393 persons. This was a relative decrease on ASA of 539 in 2020.

== History ==
The parish of St. Luke's was organized by Charles Todd Quintard on March 28, 1864, in the midst of the American Civil War. On April 22 of that year, Stephen Elliott, Bishop of the Episcopal Diocese of Georgia, consecrated the parish's first church building, with Quintard as its rector. This church house, bounded by Broad Street, Walton Street, and Forsyth Street in downtown Atlanta, cost $12,000 to build and held its first church service on April 24. On June 15, Quintard and the Reverend John W. Beckwith hosted funeral services for Confederate major general and former Episcopal Bishop Leonidas K. Polk, who had been killed a day prior at the Battle of Kennesaw Mountain. Several days later, a funeral was held at the church for the infant son of Richard Peters. In August, shells fired by Union forces severely damaged the building, which was later destroyed during the burning of Atlanta.

The parish would be reformed on June 12, 1870 under the name St. Stephen's, in honor of Elliott. The name was reverted to St. Luke's on January 8, 1872. (Note: The Georgia Historical Society gives a date of January 3 for this event.) In 1875, a new building was erected at the intersection of Spring Street and Walton Street. On April 10, 1881, Bishop John W. Beckwith made St. Luke's his cathedral, the first building to ever be designated as such in the Episcopal Diocese of Georgia. Financial difficulties facing St. Luke's had prompted the decision to bestow cathedral status on the parish, as Beckwith felt it would help the parish. In 1883, a new cathedral was built at the intersection of Pryor Street and Houston Street, at the present-day location of the Georgia-Pacific Tower. In 1894, the parish lost cathedral status.

In 1906, the church constructed a new building on Peachtree Street, which was consecrated later that year and is currently in use by the church. This Gothic structure was designed by P. Thornton Marye and A. Ten Eyck Brown. The move came during a time when many churches in Atlanta were relocating to Peachtree Street, as First Methodist Church, St. Mark Methodist Church, and First Baptist Church had all relocated to Peachtree Street during the first decade of the 1900s. In 1931, John M. Walker was made the rector of St. Luke's, a position he would hold until being made bishop of the Episcopal Diocese of Atlanta in 1942.

== Tower & Bells ==
The church's bell tower is a new addition, being added in 2000, and following the original plans.

It contains a ring of ten bells hung for change ringing, and tuned to the key of F. The heaviest eight bells date to 1924 and were cast by Mears & Stainbank of Whitechapel, London- as such they are the oldest set of bells in Georgia.

From the date of their casting in 1924 until 1996, they were hung in St Helen's Church, Escrick, North Yorkshire. In that year, the church bought the redundant ring of twelve bells from St Martin in the Bull Ring, Birmingham, and sold their previous bells. The old ring of eight bells arrived in Atlanta in 2000, and were augmented by two trebles cast by Eijsbouts of the Netherlands specially for St. Luke's new tower to form a ring of ten. The bells and their tower were blessed on July 9, and dedicated on October 22 2000. The bells are rung regularly by the parish band of ringers.

== Bibliography ==
- Clayton, Sarah "Sally" Conley (1999). Davis Jr., Robert Scott (ed.). Requiem for a Lost City: A Memoir of Civil War Atlanta and the Old South. Mercer University Press. ISBN 978-0-86554-622-6 – via Google Books.
- Craig, Robert M. (2012). The Architecture of Francis Palmer Smith, Atlanta's Scholar-architect. University of Georgia Press. ISBN 978-0-8203-2898-0 – via Google Books.
- Garrett, Franklin M. (1969). Atlanta and Environs: A Chronicle of Its People and Events, 1820s-1870s. Vol. I. University of Georgia Press. ISBN 978-0-8203-3902-3 – via Google Books.
- "Saint Luke's Episcopal Church (1864-1964)". Georgia Historical Society. December 4, 2015.
- Martin, Harold H. (1987). Atlanta and Environs: A Chronicle of Its People and Events : Years of Change and Challenge, 1940-1976. Vol. III. University of Georgia Press. ISBN 978-0-8203-0913-2 – via Google Books.
- Williford, William Bailey (1962). Peachtree Street, Atlanta. University of Georgia Press. ISBN 978-0-8203-3477-6 – via Google Books.
- Zimmerman, Elena Irish (1999). Atlanta in Vintage Postcards. Vol. I. Arcadia Publishing. ISBN 978-0-7385-0039-3 – via Google Books.
