= Frank S. Logue =

American Episcopal Bishop (born 1963)

The Right Reverend Frank S. Logue
- XI Bishop of Georgia
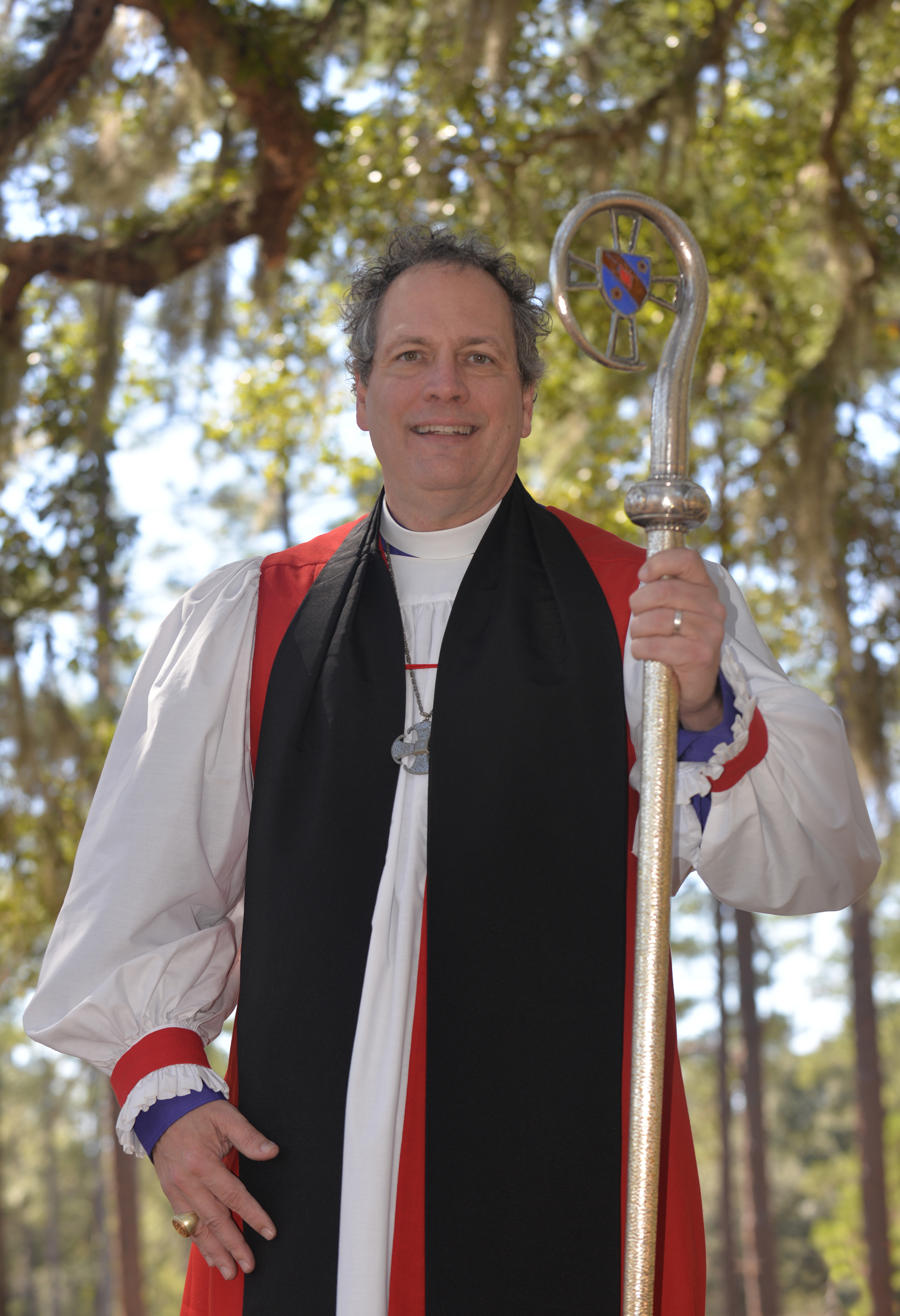
- Church: Episcopal Church
- Diocese: Episcopal Diocese of Georgia
- Elected: November 16, 2019
- In office: 2020–
- Predecessor: Scott Anson Benhase
- Previous posts: Canon to the Ordinary, Diocese of Georgia

Orders
- Ordination: 2000 by Henry I. Louttit
- Consecration: May 30, 2020 by Scott Anson Benhase
- Rank: Bishop

Personal details
- Born: 1963 (age 62–63)
- Education: Georgia Southern University; Virginia Theological Seminary

Frank Sullivan Logue (born 1963) is the eleventh bishop of the Episcopal Diocese of Georgia in the United States. He was elected November 16, 2019 to succeed Scott A. Benhase.

== Early life and career ==
Born in Montgomery, Alabama, he is a graduate of Georgia Southern University and Virginia Theological Seminary. In 1988, he hiked the Appalachian Trail with his wife, Victoria, and the two wrote The Appalachian Trail Hiker and then six other travel books.

== Ordained Ministry ==
He served as the church planter for King of Peace Episcopal Church in Kingsland, Georgia from 2000-2010. By 2004, the congregation had built its own church building and started a preschool. The new church eventually would reach nearly 150 people worshiping on a typical Sunday during his tenure as its founding rector. Logue has been a leading voice in calling the Episcopal Church to invest in starting new congregations. He worked with others, including Susan Brown Snook, to add $2.8 million more dollars to the $3 million budgeted for evangelism and church planting for the Episcopal Church's 2016-2018 budget, which included significant additional funding for Latino-Hispanic initiatives. He created a short documentary film on Deaconess Anna Alexander with Michael Chaney, a Savannah College of Art and Design film professor and Episcopal priest, which was instrumental in her being designated by the Episcopal Church as a saint. Logue was serving as Canon to the Ordinary of the Diocese of Georgia and a member of the Executive Council of the Episcopal Church when elected bishop.

=== Episcopal ministry ===
He was elected Bishop of the Episcopal Diocese of Georgia on November 16, 2019, on the first ballot. Logue succeeded Scott Anson Benhase on May 30, 2020, when he was consecrated as a bishop in Christ Church in Savannah, Georgia. Because of COVID-19 precautions, his ordination was conducted with a minimal number of people in attendance and was broadcast via livestream on the Internet. The Logues continue to write books together including, A Spring in the Desert: Rediscovering the Water of Life in Lent from Forward Movement and Feast of Feasts: Advent, Christmas, and Epiphany with St. Francis from the Diocese of Georgia. In 2024, Logue announced he was moving the diocesan offices to the former St. Michael and All Angels Parish in Savannah so the staff could work where ministry is happening as the building continues to serve 350 people a week since the church closed. This was the second of two church properties the Diocese repurposed during Logue's episcopacy after the congregations that had worshiped there disbanded. The first being the former Christ Church in Augusta becoming the Byllesby Center. On January 24, 2026, Logue professed life vows in the Third Order Society of Saint Francis a worldwide Anglican/Episcopal religious order for people of all kinds who live by Franciscan principles “in the world.” His wife, Victoria officiated on behalf of the Order as the convener of the fellowship. She professed life vows in TSSF in 2007.

== See also ==
- List of Episcopal bishops of the United States
- Historical list of the Episcopal bishops of the United States
