= Christ Church (St. Simons, Georgia) =

Historic church in Georgia , United States

- Christ Church Frederica; Christ Church St. Simons
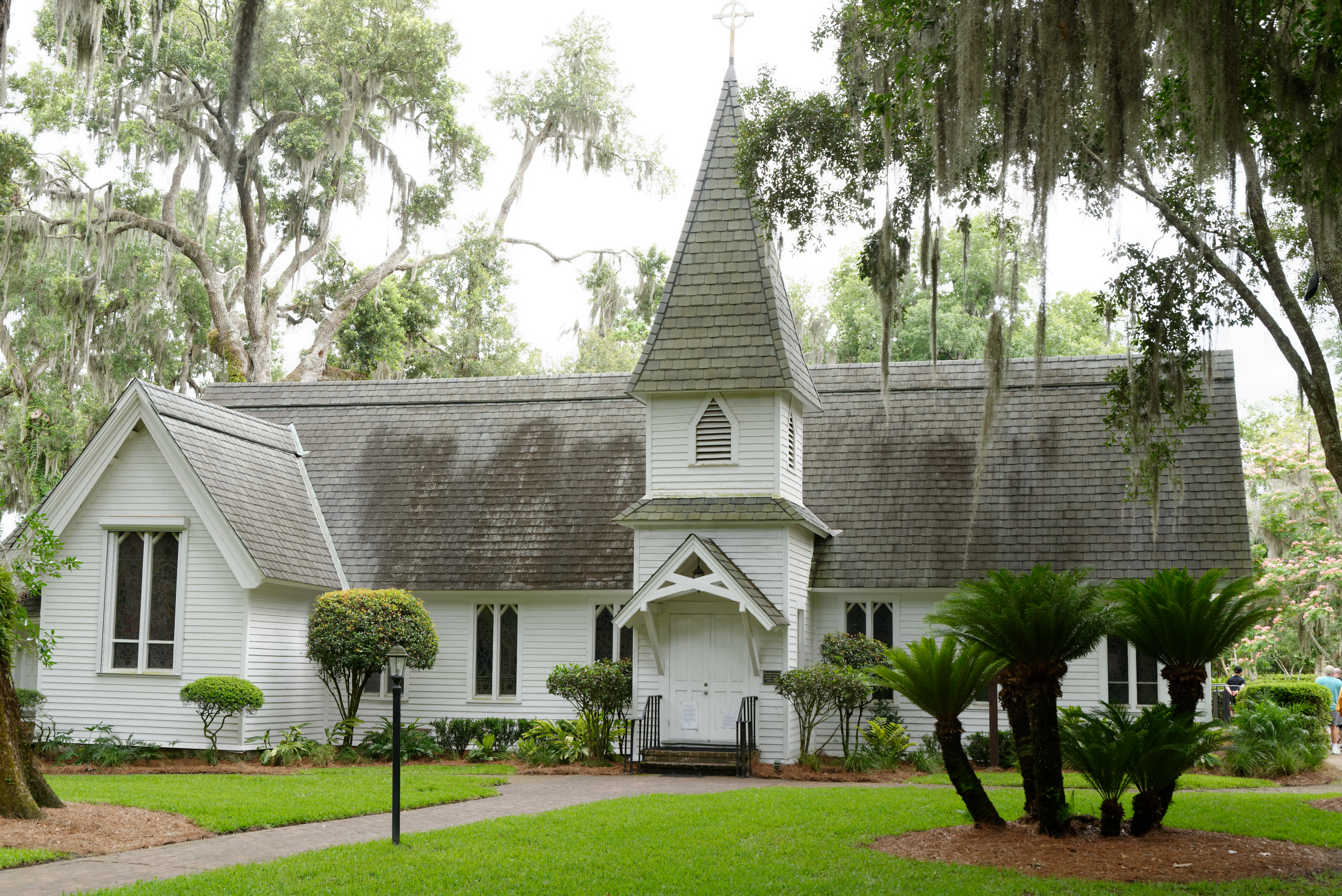
- Christ Church (2020)

- Location within Georgia Location within the United States
- 31°13′12.36″N 81°23′14.64″W
- Location: 6329 Frederica Road; St. Simons, Georgia 31522
- Country: United States
- Denomination: Episcopal Church

History
- Founded: February 15, 1736

Architecture
- Completed: 1820 (first building); 1884 (current building)
- Demolished: 1862 (first building)

Administration
- Province: Province IV
- Diocese: Episcopal Diocese of Georgia

Christ Church is an Episcopal church in St. Simons, Georgia. Beginning as a mission in 1736, the parish would be one of the first to form the Episcopal Diocese of Georgia in 1823, along with Christ Church in Savannah, Georgia and Saint Paul's Church in Augusta, Georgia. The current building was built in 1884 and is adjacent to Fort Frederica National Monument.

== History ==
On February 15, 1736, James Oglethorpe, founder of the Province of Georgia, established the town and fort of Frederica on St. Simons Island. Accompanying him was Reverend Charles Wesley, a priest within the Church of England who served as Oglethorpe's chaplain and was the brother of John Wesley, then-priest of Christ Church in Savannah, Georgia. Charles would hold religious service in a tabby structure on the island, serving in this missionary capacity until July of that year. Following Wesley's departure, other clergymen from the United Society Partners in the Gospel served on the island through the 1700s. In 1808, the state government incorporated the parish, which had been officially organized a year prior. William Best served as the first rector for this newly incorporated parish. In 1810, Edmund Matthews became the rector for the parish, a position he would hold until 1827. His tenure saw the construction of the first permanent church building on the island in 1820 and the creation of the Episcopal Diocese of Georgia in 1823. Christ Church Frederica was joined with Christ Church Savannah and Saint Paul's Church in Augusta, Georgia. In 1831, the church hosted its first convention for the diocese, and five years later, the church celebrated the centennial of the island's first religious service.

In 1840, parishioners discovered a beehive in the church's steeple. Collecting and selling honey from this hive, the churchgoers raised money for necessary repairs to the church building. In 1862, this building would be destroyed as a result of the American Civil War. Following this, lay preachers and occasional visiting clergy held services until 1879, when Anson Greene Phelps Dodge Jr. reorganized the parish. In 1884, Dodge had the church rebuilt on the site of the previous building as a memorial to his wife, who had been buried on the church grounds. This structure still stands as the church's current place of worship. In 1886, Dodge established St. Ignatius as an outreach for freed slaves on the island. Dodge died in 1898, leaving an endowment for the diocese that funded much of the diocese's missionary work at that time. Anna Alexander served as deaconess of St. Ignatius, in doing so becoming the first black deaconess in the Episcopal Church. In 1998, she was named a saint by the diocese and in 2018 was added to the Episcopal Church's calendar of saints.

== Bibliography ==
- Lawrence, James B. (1920). Burleson, Hugh L. (ed.). How Our Church Came to Our Country: A Series of Illustrated Papers. Morehouse Publishing Company – via Google Books.
- Morris, Patricia (2003). St. Simons Island. Arcadia Publishing. ISBN 978-0-7385-1586-1 – via Google Books.
- Roberts, Amy Lotson; Holladay, Patrick J. (2019). Gullah Geechee Heritage in the Golden Isles. Arcadia Publishing. ISBN 978-1-4396-6764-4 – via Google Books.
- Vanstory, Burnette (1981). Georgia's Land of the Golden Isles. University of Georgia Press. ISBN 978-0-8203-0558-5 – via Google Books.
