= Ana Alexander =

Ana Alexander may refer to:

- Ana Alexander (athlete) (born 1954), Cuban athlete
- Ana Alexander (actress) (fl. 1990s–2020s), American actress

== See also ==
- Anna Alexander (c. 1865–1947), first and only African-American consecrated a deaconess in the Episcopal Church
