= Stephen Elliott (botanist) =

American politician, botanist (1771-1830)

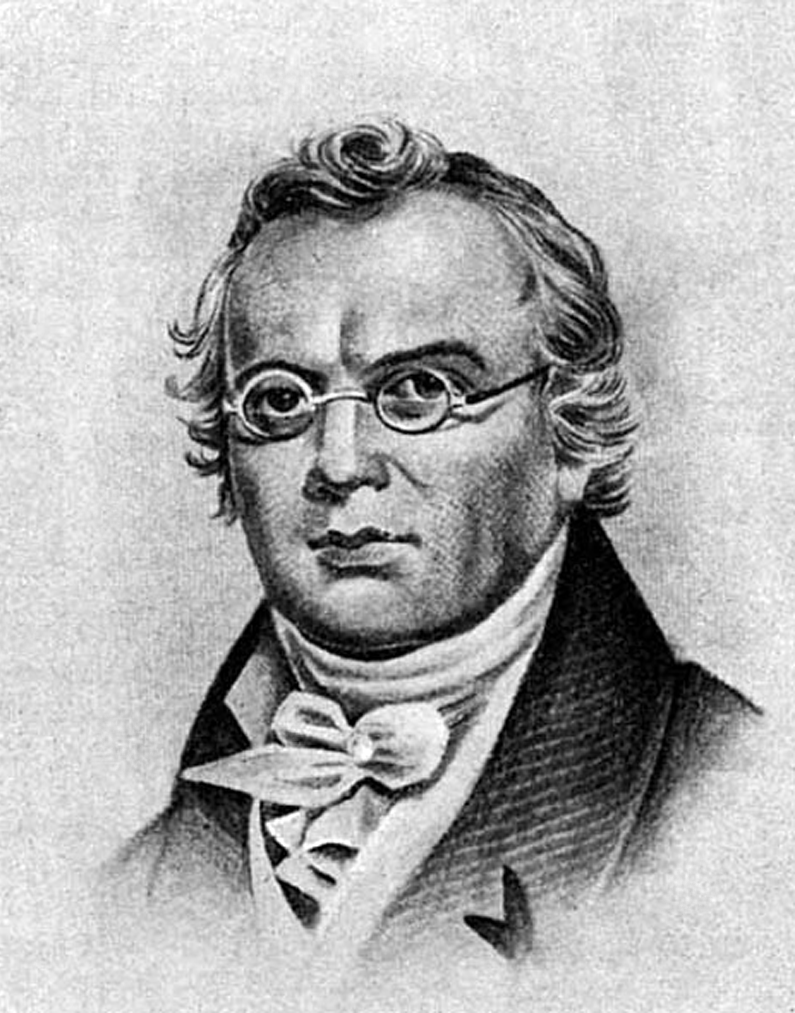
- Born: November 11, 1777; Beaufort, Colony of South Carolina
- Died: March 28, 1830 (aged 52); Charleston, South Carolina, U.S.
- Education: Yale University
- Scientific career
- Fields: Botany

Stephen Elliott (November 11, 1771 – March 28, 1830) was an American legislator, banker, educator, and botanist who is today remembered for having written one of the most important works in American botany, A Sketch of the Botany of South-Carolina and Georgia. The plant genus Elliottia is named after him.

== Life ==
Stephen Elliott was born in Beaufort, South Carolina, on November 11, 1771. He grew up there, then moved to New Haven, Connecticut, to attend Yale University. He graduated in 1791 as the valedictorian of his class. From Yale, he returned to South Carolina to work the plantation that he had inherited.

He was elected to the legislature in South Carolina in 1793 or 1796 (sources disagree) and served until about 1800. He then left the legislature and devoted himself to the management of his plantation. He was re-elected to the legislature in 1808 and worked to have a bank established by the state. When the bank was founded in 1812, he resigned from the legislature and was appointed president of what was then called the "Bank of the State of South Carolina", a position that he held for the rest of his life.

His leisure was devoted to literature and science, and he cultivated the study of botany with enthusiasm. Elliott was elected a Fellow of the American Academy of Arts and Sciences in 1808. In 1813 he was instrumental in founding the Literary and Philosophical Society of South Carolina, of which he was president. He gave free lectures on botany, and was for some time editor of the Southern Review. In 1825 he aided in establishing the Medical College of South Carolina, and was elected professor of natural history and botany, which he taught until his death in 1830.

Elliott engaged in a long and active correspondence with many of the botanists of his time, but wrote an especially large number of letters to Henry Muhlenberg of Pennsylvania. The material that Elliott collected on numerous field trips and his intimate knowledge of the southeastern flora was of great value to botanists elsewhere. Elliott's herbarium was one of the largest in America during his lifetime. Its specimens proved invaluable to John Torrey, Asa Gray, and others. The herbarium is preserved at the Charleston Museum.

The US Federal census of 1830 records that both Elliott and his wife had extensive slaveholdings across the South Carolina and Georgia Lowcountry, enslaving 287 people in total.

He died in Charleston, South Carolina March 28, 1830. His son Stephen grew up to become a Protestant Episcopal bishop.

== A Sketch of the Botany of South Carolina and Georgia ==
His classic work, A Sketch of the Botany of South-Carolina and Georgia contained the first botanical descriptions of many species. It was these descriptions which validated many of the names published as nomina nuda by Henry Muhlenberg. Initially published in several installments from 1816 to 1824, these were later combined into two volumes: volume I in 1821 and volume II in 1824. These dates were dates of last installment, not dates of original publication. It was prepared with the assistance of James McBride.

In 1900, Science described him as "the father of southern botany." In 1901, Frank Lamson-Scribner wrote the following about Elliott's Sketch:

Not until one has prepared a book where almost every line contains a statement of fact learned from original observation can he fully appreciate the amount of patience and labor involved in the preparation of such a work as the Sketch of the Botany of South Carolina and Georgia...today it remains indispensable to the working systematic botanists of our country.

== Other published works ==
- Elliott, S. 1818. Observations on the genus Glycine, and some of its kindred genera. Part 1. Journal of the Academy of Natural Sciences of Philadelphia 1(7), 320–326. (Read June 23, 1818) (BHL link)
- Elliott, S. 1818. Observations on the genus Glycine, and some of its kindred genera. Part 2. Journal of the Academy of Natural Sciences of Philadelphia 1(7), 371–373. (Read June 23, 1818) (BHL link)

The standard author abbreviation Elliott is used to indicate this person as the author when citing a botanical name.

== See also ==
- Category:Taxa named by Stephen Elliott
