= All Saints Episcopal Church (Tybee Island, Georgia) =

All Saints Church
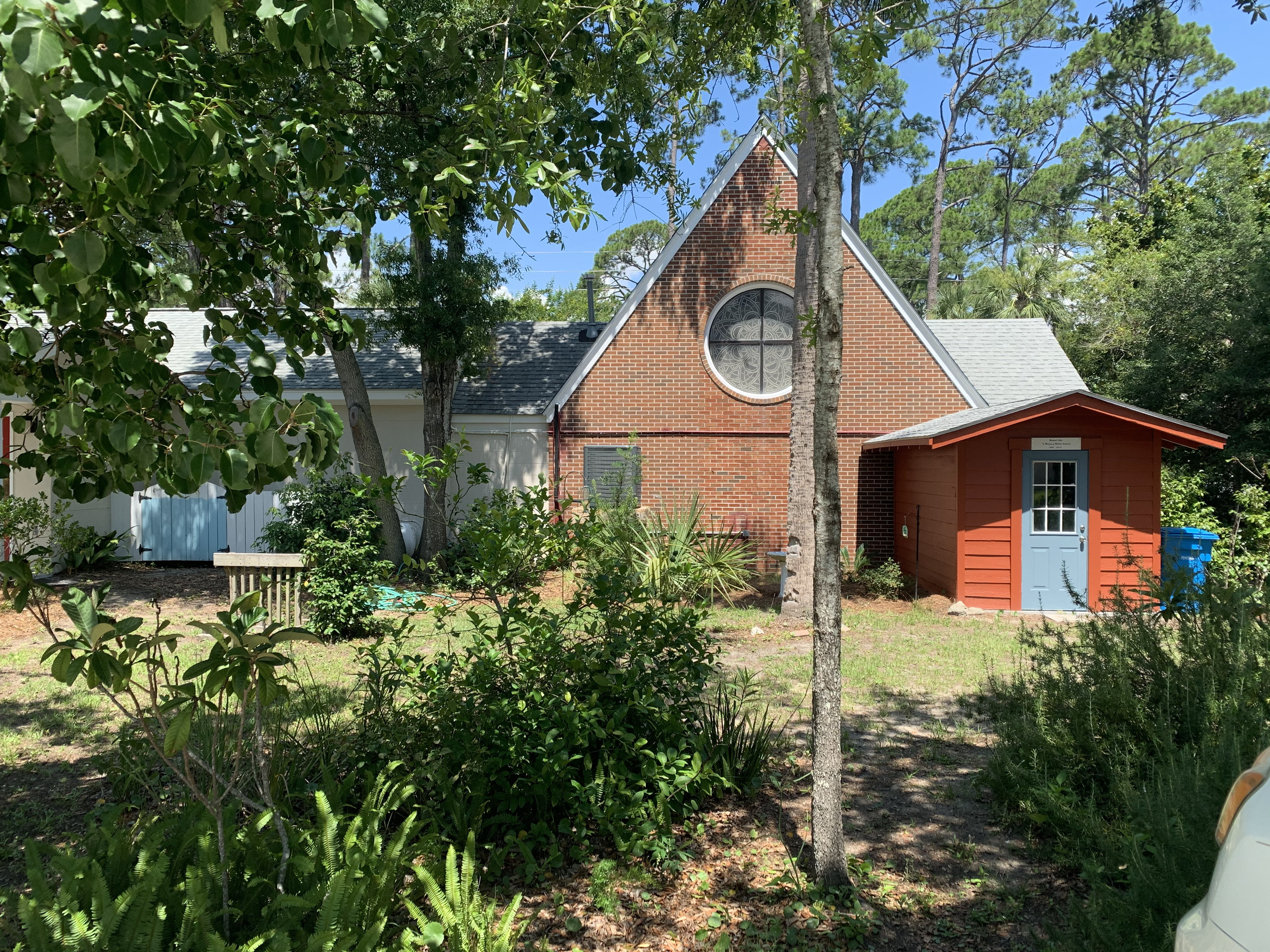
- All Saints Church
- 32.003765°N 80.846594°W
- Location: 804 Jones Avenue, Tybee Island, Georgia
- Country: United States
- Denomination: Episcopal
- Website: www.allsaintstybee.com

History
- Status: active
- Founded: 1959

Administration
- Diocese: Diocese of Georgia

Clergy
- Vicar: June Johnson

All Saints Church is a local church in Tybee Island, Georgia, itself in the Episcopal Diocese of Georgia.

== History ==
Early Episcopalian congregants originally met on Tybee Island's Methodist church. However, a new site was needed after the church was destroyed by a hurricane in 1948. The clergy chose to meet in the town's city hall.

The city hall was used as a church until 1957, when it was decided that a more permanent site was needed. In 1958, land and funds to build the church were donated, and construction began soon after. Construction ended in 1959, and the church was officially blessed.

Other features were soon added to the church, including stained glass windows in 1990, a Mission Hall in 1998, and its garden in 2000.

== Ministries ==
Currently, All Saints Church runs three ministries: Family Promise, Fresh Air Home, and Nursing Home Christmas. Their focus is alleviating homelessness, developing character in children, and celebrating Christmas at the local nursing homes, respectively.
