= Protestant Episcopal Church in the Confederate States of America =

Anglican Christian denomination

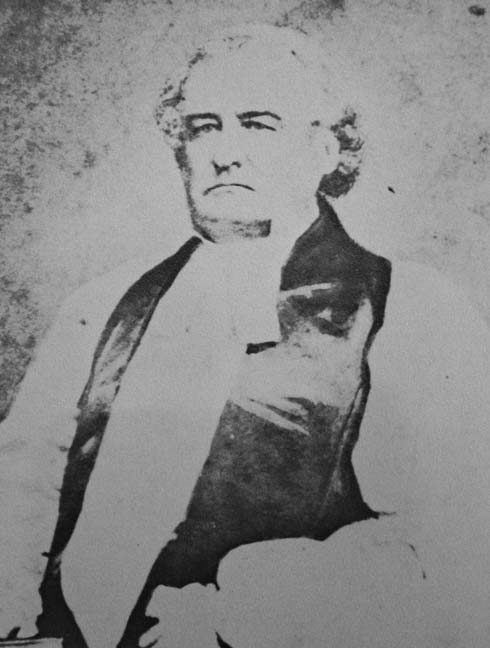
Presiding Bishop Elliott

The Protestant Episcopal Church in the Confederate States of America was an Anglican Christian denomination which existed from 1861 to 1865. It was formed by Southern dioceses of the Episcopal Church in the United States during the American Civil War. When the Southern states seceded from the Union and established the Confederate States of America, it was not unusual for Protestant churches to split along national lines also. The Episcopalians were different as their separation was made only after the Confederacy was created and ended within six months of the South's surrender when Southern Episcopalians reunited with their counterparts in the North.

== Organization ==
Although the General Convention of the Episcopal Church was held in Richmond, Virginia in October of 1859, just before John Brown's raid on Harpers Ferry, Southern states did not begin to secede from the Union for another year. Beginning with the secession of South Carolina in December 1860, Southern dioceses struggled over the issue of their status in the Episcopal Church. The first diocese to separate was that of Louisiana, whose bishop Leonidas Polk issued a proclamation on January 30, 1861, stating, "The State of Louisiana having, by a formal ordinance, through her Delegates in Convention assembled, withdrawn herself from all further connection with the United States of America, and constituted herself a separate Sovereignty, has, by that act, removed our Diocese from within the pale of 'The Protestant Episcopal Church in the United States'". Although other bishops disagreed with Polk's view that actions of civil authorities could automatically sever a diocese's relationship with the wider church, the Southern bishops agreed that a separation existed, even if a division might not. The southern bishops also maintained that this was a separation forced upon them by the changing political realities.

On March 23, 1861, Polk and Stephen Elliott of Georgia, the two most senior bishops, requested the Confederate dioceses send representatives to Montgomery, Alabama, for a meeting on July 3. All invited dioceses were represented except Texas. Virginia and North Carolina dioceses were not represented as their states had not seceded at the time the meeting was called. At this meeting, a committee was chosen to write a draft constitution and canons. This meeting ended with a resolution stating: "That the secession of the States ... from the United States, and the formation by them of a new government, called the Confederate States of America, renders it necessary and expedient that the Dioceses within those States should form among themselves an independent organization."

From October 16–20, a convention was held at Trinity Church (now Cathedral) in Columbia, South Carolina, which recommended the proposed constitution to the dioceses for ratification. The constitution was essentially the same as that of the Episcopal Church in the United States. It differed in that it introduced a provincial structure (the Episcopal Church USA would later create provinces as well), and the diocesan and General Conventions were renamed diocesan councils and General Council respectively.

== Operation ==
By November 1862, most dioceses had ratified the constitution. The dioceses of Tennessee and Louisiana were not able to hold diocesan conventions until after the war and were never officially a part of the Confederate church. Moreover, their bishops, James Hervey Otey of Tennessee and Leonidas Polk of Louisiana, died during the war.

The first general council was held November 12–22, 1862, at Saint Paul's Church in Augusta, Georgia. Many bishops also gathered for Polk's funeral at that same church in June 1864, at which Presiding Bishop Elliott preached. Another meeting of the Southern bishops was held at Augusta on September 27, 1865. A second and final general council was held there on November 8–10, 1865.

== Post-war reintegration ==
After the South's defeat, the Southern dioceses rejoined the Episcopal Church in the United States at its 1865 General Convention in Philadelphia, Pennsylvania. Missionary Bishop Henry C. Lay of Arkansas and the Southwest, along with Bishop Thomas Atkinson of North Carolina, resumed their seats in the House of Bishops after several conferences with Presiding Bishop John Henry Hopkins of Vermont and Bishop Horatio Potter of New York, helping to reunite the divided Episcopal church. Bishop Thomas F. Davis of South Carolina, who opposed reunion, was infirm and blind and so did not attend. Three other Confederate bishops chose not to travel to Philadelphia, taking a wait and see attitude: Bishop Elliot of Georgia, Bishop John Johns of Virginia, and Bishop William Mercer Green of Mississippi. The House of Deputies debated condemnatory resolutions, but did not pass them. Instead, the deputies passed a simple resolution of thanksgiving for the restoration of peace in the country and unity in the Church. The only Southern bishop consecrated during the separation, Richard Hooker Wilmer, was accepted into the re-united church, notwithstanding that he was under house arrest in Alabama for instructing his clergy not to pray for the President of the United States as part of his opposition to military rule. The General Convention also affirmed the election of Dr. Charles Todd Quintard as Bishop of Tennessee.

== Dioceses ==
- Diocese of Alabama
- Diocese of Arkansas
- Diocese of Florida
- Diocese of Georgia
- Diocese of Mississippi
- Diocese of North Carolina
- Diocese of South Carolina
- Diocese of Texas
- Diocese of Virginia
