= King of Peace Episcopal Church (Kingsland, Georgia) =

Coordinates: 30.82386°N 81.65294°W

King of Peace Episcopal Church, Kingsland, Georgia
- King of Peace Episcopal Church, Kingsland, Georgia
- Denomination: Episcopal Church
- Website: King of Peace website

Administration
- Province: IV
- Diocese: Georgia
- Deanery: Southeastern
- Parish: King of Peace Kingsland, Georgia

Clergy
- Rector: The Rev. Aaron Brewer

King of Peace Episcopal Church is an Episcopal church located at 6230 Laurel Island Parkway, Kingsland, Georgia. It is a parish of the Diocese of Georgia created in 2000. The church first met in a house on its present site and built a church building in 2004, giving away the house to be a home once more. The church has a 43,000-marble tile labyrinth in the floor of its sanctuary.

In 2015, the church reported 218 members; in 2023, it reported 250 members. No membership statistics were reported in 2024 national parochial reports. Plate and pledge financial support reported by the church in 2024 was $227,657. Average Sunday Attendance (ASA) reported in 2024 was 79 persons. This was a relative decrease on ASA of 106 in 2020.

The church created King of Peace Episcopal Day School in 2004 as a full-day, full-year preschool for children age 18 months to five years which operates in the same building. In 2009, the school was named a Center of Distinction by the State of Georgia's licensing division, making it a model day care facility for other schools. That same year, the school purchased 11.7 acres (47,000 m^{2}) in St. Marys to be developed as a private school with the preschool to remain at King of Peace Church. The church is involved in its community through Scouting and Habitat for Humanity. In 2010, King of Peace became a parish of the Diocese of Georgia, moving from its previous status as a mission congregation.

== Weekly Services ==
- Sunday Eucharists - 8:30 and 10 am
- Wednesday Eucharist - 6:15pm

== See also ==
- Kingsland, Georgia
- Episcopal Diocese of Georgia
