= Cleland Kinloch Nelson =

19th and 20th-century American Episcopal bishop

The Right Reverend Cleland Kinloch Nelson
- Bishop of Atlanta
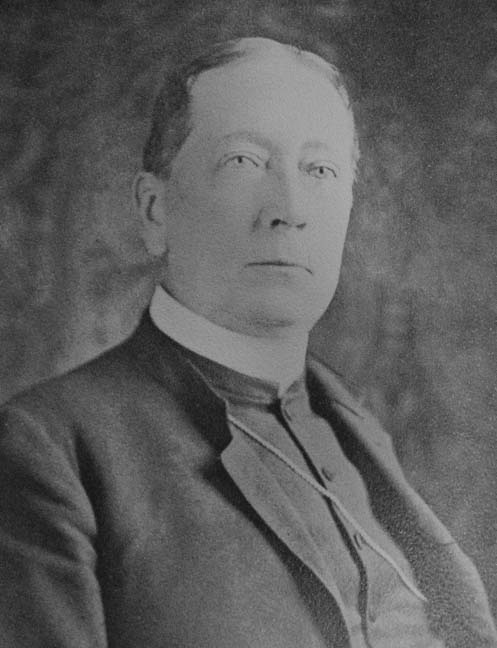
- Church: Episcopal Church
- Diocese: Atlanta
- Elected: December 4, 1907
- In office: 1907–1917
- Successor: Henry J. Mikell
- Previous post: Bishop of Georgia (1892-1907)

Orders
- Ordination: June 22, 1876 by William Bacon Stevens
- Consecration: February 24, 1892 by Charles Todd Quintard

Personal details
- Born: May 23, 1852 Cobham, Virginia, U.S.
- Died: February 13, 1917 (aged 64) Atlanta, Georgia, U.S.
- Buried: Westview Cemetery
- Denomination: Anglican
- Parents: Keating Simons Nelson & Julia Ann Rogers
- Spouse: Maria Bruce Matthews
- Education: St. John's College, B.A. University of the South, D.D. Berkeley Divinity School, D.D.

Cleland Kinloch Nelson (May 23, 1852 - February 12, 1917) was the Third Bishop of the U.S. state of Georgia and the first bishop of the Episcopal Diocese of Atlanta. Nelson was the 160th bishop of the Episcopal Church in the United States of America (ECUSA).

== Early and family life ==
Nelson was born in 1852 to Julia Ann Rogers Nelson (1825-1890) and her husband, Keating Lewis Simons Nelson (1819-1898) at Cobham, a plantation in Albemarle County, Virginia. He had two older brothers, Dr. Hugh Nelson (1842-1903) and Francis K. Nelson (1845-1864), as well as sisters Margaret Nelson (1843-1858), Elizabeth Harrison Nelson Mason (1846-1945) and Celia Hamilton Nelson (1848-1929) and younger brothers Rev. Keating Simons Nelson Jr. (1856-1919) and William Meade Nelson (1859-1843). His father owned a plantation, and about 35 enslaved people in 1850. His grandfather was U.S. Congressman Hugh Nelson (1768-1836) and his paternal great-grandfather Thomas Nelson (1738-1789) had signed the Declaration of Independence and served as Governor of Virginia. An uncle of the same name, Cleland Kinloch Nelson (1814-1890), was an Episcopal priest in Maryland. His elder brothers both served in the Confederate States Army during the American Civil War. Hugh Nelson rose to become a captain in the 4th Virginia Cavalry and on the staff of General R.S. Ewell, and was commended for his actions at the Battle of Port Republic. His other brother, Francis K. Nelson, enlisted in the Rockbridge Light Artillery battery, transferred to the 1st Virginia Cavalry, then the 2nd Virginia Cavalry and was promoted to sergeant a month before being mustered out and dying in May, 1864.

Nelson attended St. John's College in Annapolis, Maryland and graduated with an A.B. degree in 1872. He received an honorary Doctor of Divinity degree from the University of the South in 1891, and another D.D. degree from the Berkeley Divinity School in 1892.

Nelson married Maria Bruce Matthews (1857-1937) of Port Tobacco, Maryland in 1877; they had no children.

== Career ==
Nelson was ordained as a deacon by Maryland's bishop Pinkney in 1875. He was ordained to the priesthood by Bishop William Bacon Stevens of Pennsylvania in 1876. Nelson served as rector of the Church of St. John the Baptist in what became Philadelphia's Germantown neighborhood (1876-1882), then accepted a position as rector of Cathedral Church of the Nativity in Bethlehem, Pennsylvania (1882-1892), then in the Episcopal Diocese of Central Pennsylvania but since 1904 the cathedral of the Episcopal Diocese of Bethlehem.

After two higher profile churchmen refused to accept offers to lead the Episcopal Diocese of Georgia, Nelson accepted the offer made to him. He was consecrated as Bishop on February 24, 1892, in St. Luke's Church, Atlanta, by bishops including Charles Todd Quintard of Tennessee, William B. W. Howe of South Carolina and Theodore B. Lyman of North Carolina as well as bishops Whitehead, Rulison, Coleman, Jackson and Watson. Nelson served as Bishop of the Episcopal Diocese of Georgia until its split into two dioceses in 1907, when he chose to become the first bishop of the Episcopal Diocese of Atlanta.

As bishop, Nelson had challenged the Diocese of Georgia to grow, and it did. From 1893 until 1906, the diocese grew from 88 missions to 108 missions, and its 6,292 communicants of 1893 swelled to 9,229 by 1906. During that same time period, sixty-two church buildings were built in the diocese. Nelson also supported African Americans within his diocese to the extent permitted by social mores, consecrating the first and only African American deaconess, Anna Alexander, in 1907. Addressing the second annual meeting of the diocese's council of colored churchmen at the Church of the Good Shepherd, he described Alexander as "a devout, godly and respected colored woman," and ordained her as a deaconess (she would become the Episcopal Church's first and only African American deaconess). At the time of the diocesan separation later that year, the Diocese of Atlanta (northwestern Georgia) was created with 28 churches and missions. The remaining Diocese of Georgia consisted of 24 churches (including deaconess Alexander's Church of the Good Shepherd).

Nelson's publications included collections of Episcopal Addresses and Occasional Sermons, as well as editorial articles in The Church in Georgia.

== Death and legacy ==
Nelson died February 12, 1917, at the age of 65, after serving as a bishop for 25 years. He was buried at Westview Cemetery in Atlanta, near his friend (and church founder) Thomas Egleston.

== Sources ==
- The Episcopal Church in Georgia 1733-1957, by Henry Thompson Malone published by The Protestant Episcopal Church in the Diocese of Atlanta, 1960
