= Episcopal Diocese of Georgia =

Episcopal Church diocese in the US

Coordinates: 32°N 83°W

Diocese of Georgia Diocesis Georgiensis

- Coat of arms

Location
- Country: United States
- Ecclesiastical province: IV (Southeast)
- Subdivisions: Six Convocations

Statistics
- Congregations: 67 (2024)
- Members: 12,038 (2023)

Information
- Denomination: Episcopal Church
- Established: February 24, 1823
- Language: English, Spanish

Current leadership
- Bishop: Frank Logue

Map
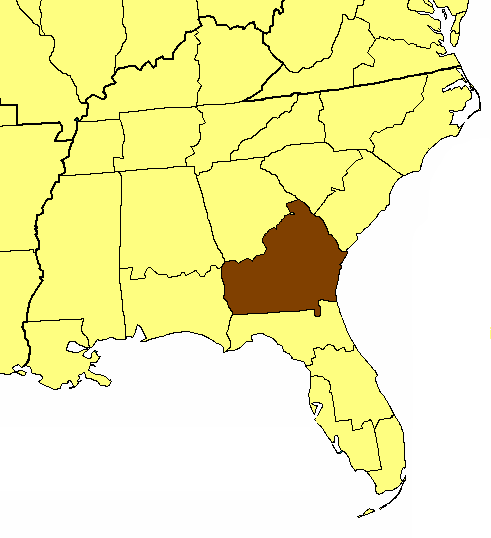
- Location of the Diocese of Georgia

Website
- gaepiscopal.org

The Episcopal Diocese of Georgia is one of 20 dioceses that comprise Province IV of the US Episcopal Church, and is a diocese within the worldwide Anglican Communion. The current bishop is Frank S. Logue, who succeeded Scott Anson Benhase on May 30, 2020, when he was consecrated 11th bishop of Georgia at a service held in Christ Church in Savannah, Georgia.

As of November 2019 there were 65 parishes, one aided parish, and four newer worshipping communities in the diocese, with 76 priests and 28 deacons.

In 2024, the diocese reported average Sunday attendance (ASA) of 3,398 persons. No membership statistics were reported in 2024 national parochial reports.

== History ==
The Episcopal Church in Georgia began as a small diocese of three parishes in 1823: Christ Church, Savannah; Christ Church, St. Simons Island; and St. Pauls, Augusta. Seventeen years later there were six churches as Christ Church, Macon; Trinity Church, Columbus; and Grace Church, Clarkesville had been added to the earlier three churches. Christ Church, Savannah's pledge of $400 to the ministry in Clarkesville made the ministry of Grace Church possible and secured the six parishes necessary to elect a bishop. The six parishes met in Clarkesville in 1840 to unanimously nominate and unanimously elect the then 36-year-old Stephen Elliott as the first Bishop of Georgia.

In 1861, Elliott and Leonidas Polk, Bishop of Louisiana issued a letter calling for a break with the General Convention of The Episcopal Church, which they noted came not from doctrinal differences but "political changes." The group that met in response to this letter formed the Protestant Episcopal Church of the Confederate States of America, with Elliott as its first and only Presiding Bishop. The Confederate church was reunited with the remainder of The Protestant Episcopal Church in the United States in 1865. Stephen Elliot died unexpectedly on December 21, 1866.

The following year, John W. Beckwith, then rector of Trinity Church, New Orleans. was elected as the second Bishop of the Diocese of Georgia. He was consecrated as Bishop on April 2, 1868, in St. John's Church, Savannah. Beckwith served as Bishop of the Episcopal Diocese of Georgia for 23 years during the difficult period of reconstruction. There were 31 churches in the diocese at the time of his consecration. At his death, there were 53 churches and five missions. In 1887–1888, Beckwith spent five months abroad preaching in Anglican Churches in Italy, France, England, Egypt and Palestine. He died November 23, 1890.

Finding a successor for Beckwith proved difficult as the diocese was twice turned down by those elected to the office. First Thomas Gailor who served as the Vice-Chancellor of the University of the South turned down the job after his election in May 1891. Then Ethelbert Talbot, Missionary Bishop of Wyoming and Idaho declined in July of that year. Both men cited their commitments to their present positions. Finally, on November 11, 1891, Cleland Kinchloch Nelson, rector of Church of the Nativity in South Bethlehem, Pennsylvania, was elected. He accepted the position and was consecrated as the third Bishop of Georgia on February 24, 1892, at St. Luke's Church, Atlanta.

As Bishop, Nelson challenged the Diocese of Georgia to grow and from 1893 to 1906, the diocese went from 88 missions to 108 missions with the 6,292 communicants of 1893 swelling to 9,229 by 1906. During that same time period, sixty-two church buildings were built. The Diocese of Atlanta (northwestern Georgia) was set apart from the Diocese of Georgia in 1907 with Nelson serving as its first Bishop. At the time of the separation, the reduced Diocese of Georgia had 4,439 communicants.

In 1907 Anna Alexander of the Diocese of Georgia became the first (and only ever) African-American deaconess in the Episcopal Church.

In February 1908 the Diocese of Georgia met in convention in Augusta and elected Frederick Focke Reese, rector of Christ Church, Nashville, Tennessee. as the fourth Bishop of Georgia. That spring, poor health caused the newly elected bishop to take an extended leave of absence, resuming ecclesiastical duties April 1, 1909. During his tenure as Bishop, the missionary work of the diocese concerned the creation of new missions for blacks. By 1913, there were two predominantly black parishes in the diocese, St. Athanasius Church, Brunswick and St. Stephen's, Savannah, as well as thirteen predominantly black missions. Reese served until his retirement in 1934.

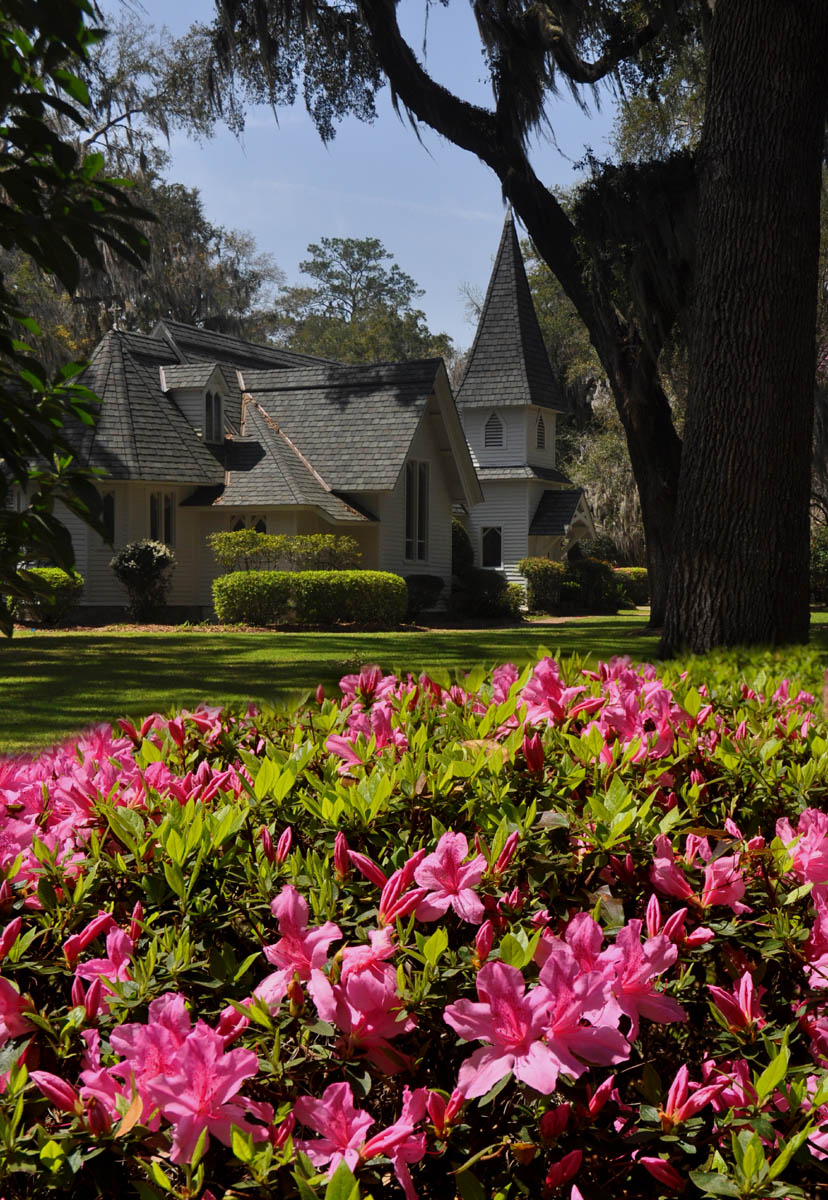
Christ Church on St. Simons Island was one of the founding parishes of the Diocese of Georgia

The election of a successor to Reese took two conventions to be decided. On August 30, 1934, a special convention was held at Grace Church, Waycross and failed in twelve ballots to elect a new bishop. A second session met January 15, 1935, at St. Paul's, Augusta and took nine more ballots to elect Middleton S. Barnwell, then Missionary Bishop of Idaho, to become the fifth Bishop of the Diocese of Georgia. At the time of his election, there were 16 parishes, 21 organized missions, 13 unorganized missions, five mission stations and one parochial mission. The still segregated church records noted 5,391 white and 1,029 black communicants. During his tenure as bishop, which lasted until 1954 the diocese grew to 8,156 total communicants with two more churches becoming parishes and four additional missions created.

During the diocesan convention of 1954 seventeen persons were nominated to succeed Barnwell. Even with the large field of candidates, Albert Rhett Stuart, Dean of Christ Church Cathedral, New Orleans, was elected on the second ballot and was consecrated as the sixth Bishop of the Diocese of Georgia in St. Paul's Church, Augusta, on October 20, 1954. In 1957, a newly acquired Diocesan House on East Bay Street in Savannah was dedicated as the diocesan headquarters. At that time, there were 9,976 communicants in the Episcopal Diocese of Georgia.

Paul Reeves was consecrated as the seventh Bishop of the Diocese of Georgia on September 30, 1969. He was succeeded by Harry W. Shipps who was consecrated on January 6, 1984. During Shipps' tenure as diocesan bishop, the diocese made headlines in 1990 when a former Assemblies of God minister, Stan White, lead his independent congregation to join the Episcopal Church en masse and as Christ the King Church, Valdosta, became a congregation in the Episcopal Diocese of Georgia.

The ninth Bishop of the Diocese of Georgia, Henry I. Louttit Jr., was rector of Christ Church, Valdosta at the time of his election. He was consecrated as bishop on January 21, 1995. Louttit had long been interested in liturgical renewal and was involved in the creation of the Book of Common Prayer 1979. Under Louttit's leadership, the Episcopal Diocese of Georgia has taken renewed interest in starting new congregations. He authorized the formation of the missions of St. Stephen's, Leesburg; Church of the Holy Comforter, Martinez; King of Peace, Kingsland; St. Luke's, Rincon, and the Episcopal Church of Our Savior at Honey Creek. Louttit's father, Henry I. Louttit Sr., was the last bishop of the Diocese of South Florida before it was divided into three new dioceses.

The tenth Bishop of Georgia was elected September 12, 2009, in Dublin, Georgia and consecrated on January 23, 2010, at the Savannah International Trade and Convention Center. Scott Benhase was graduated from Virginia Theological Seminary. He served at parishes in Indiana, North Carolina, Ohio and Virginia before he was called to be rector of St. Alban's, Washington, D.C. (Diocese of Washington) in 2006, where he was serving at the time of his election. Benhase's major initiative is the Campaign for Congregational Development, a capital campaign raising funds to enhance capacity in congregational growth and development, clergy and lay leader development, and leadership formation of youth and young adults.

The eleventh Bishop of Georgia, Frank S. Logue, was elected November 16, 2019, and consecrated on May 30, 2020, at Christ Church, Savannah. In 2024, Logue announced he was moving the diocesan offices to the former St. Michael and All Angels Parish in Savannah so the staff could work where ministry is happening as the building continues to serve 350 people a week since the church closed. This was the second of two church properties the Diocese repurposed during Logue's episcopacy after the congregations that had worshiped there disbanded. The first being the former Christ Church in Augusta which became the Byllesby Center.

Today the Diocese of Georgia now covers the southeastern 32,994 square miles (85,450 km^{2}) of the State of Georgia, running from the Chattahoochee River west of Americus to the Savannah River north of Augusta. Savannah is the see city. In February 2007, the Diocese of Georgia reported 18,651 communicants with an average Sunday attendance of 7,127 in its 71 churches.

Theologically, the Georgia Diocese runs the spectrum from moderate liberalism to traditionalist conservatism. Generally, congregations are typically more conservative than their neighbors in the Atlanta diocese, but in most places, especially in small towns, they are often the most liberal religious alternatives available in their communities, which are usually dominated by Southern-style fundamentalist traditions like the Southern Baptist Convention and the Presbyterian Church in America. The first significant episode of Anglican realignment activity in the diocese occurred when the rector and most of the congregation of Christ Church in Savannah left the Episcopal Church in 2007 to form Christ Church Anglican. More recently, in August 2012, the parish of St. John's Episcopal Church, in Moultrie, led by rector William McQueen, decided to leave the Episcopal Church to become St. Mark's Anglican Church of the Anglican Church in North America.

However, the diocese reorganized Christ Church with a basically new congregation in the early 2010s, and the town of Moultrie had another Episcopal parish for residents of Colquitt County to attend, minimizing the trauma of those two defections.

== Bishops ==
The following is a list of the Bishops of the Diocese of Georgia:

1. Stephen Elliott, 1841–1866 (deceased); also presiding bishop of the Episcopal Church in the Confederate States of America
2. John W. Beckwith, 1868–1890 (deceased)
3. Cleland K. Nelson, 1892–1907 (deceased)
4. Frederick F. Reese, 1908–1936 (deceased)
5. Middleton S. Barnwell, 1936–1954 (deceased)
6. Albert R. Stuart, 1954–1971 (deceased)
7. Paul Reeves, 1972–1985 (deceased)
8. Harry W. Shipps, 1985–1994 (deceased)
9. Henry I. Louttit Jr., 1995–2010 (deceased)
10. Scott A. Benhase, 2010–2020
11. Frank S. Logue, 2020–present

== List of parishes ==
Parishes:

Albany Convocation

- Calvary, Americus
- Christ Church, Cordele
- Holy Trinity, Blakely
- St. Anne's, Tifton
- St. John and St. Mark's, Albany
- St. Matthew's, Fitzgerald
- St. Patrick's, Albany
- St. Paul's, Albany
- Trinity, Cochran

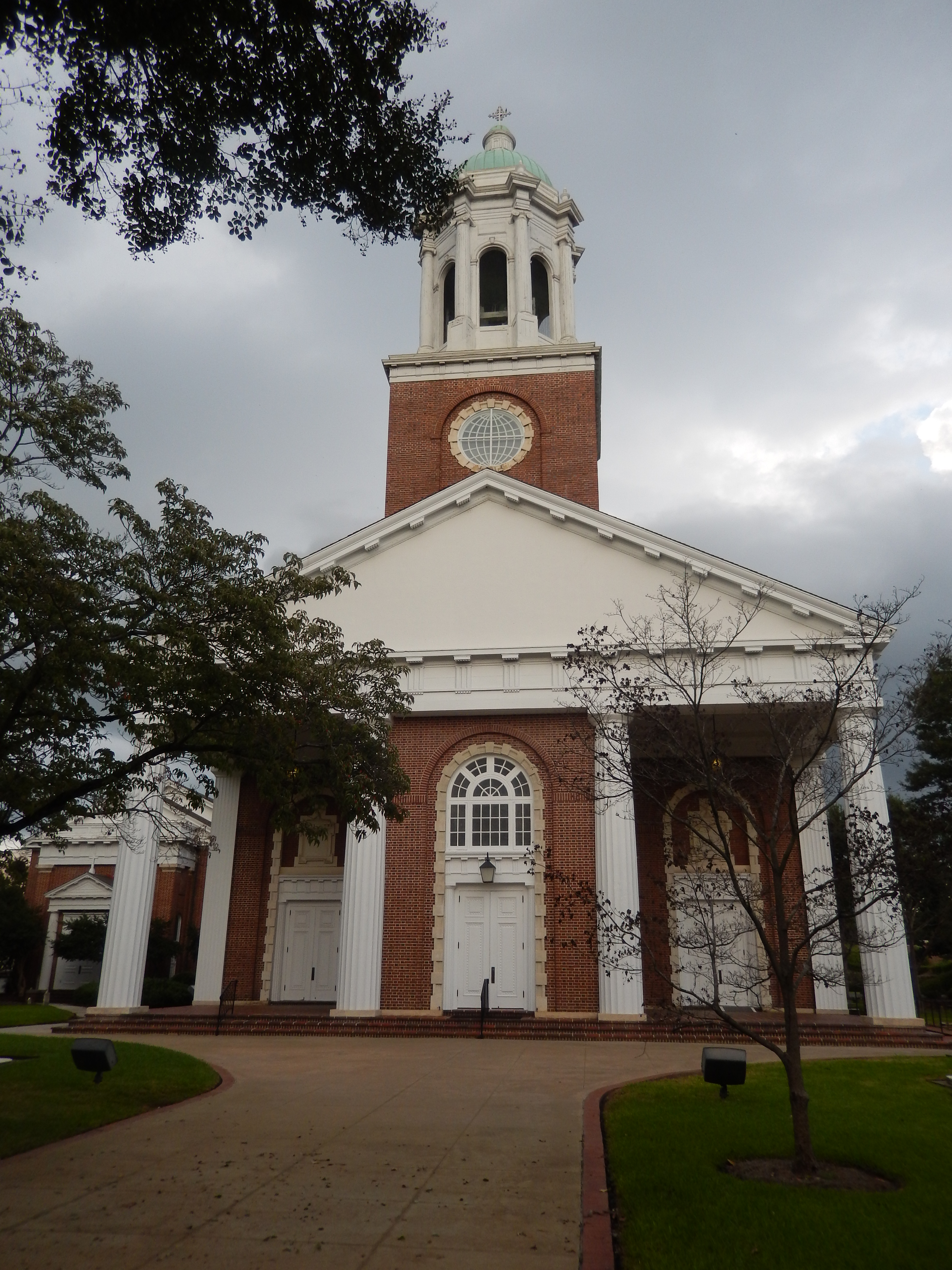
Saint Paul's Episcopal Church, Augusta

Augusta Convocation

- Church of the Atonement, Augusta
- Good Shepherd, Augusta
- Holy Comforter, Martinez
- Holy Cross, Thomson
- Our Savior, Martinez
- St. Alban's, Augusta
- St. Augustine's, Augusta
- St. Mary's, Augusta
- St. Michael's, Waynesboro
- St. Paul's, Augusta

Central Convocation

- Annunciation, Vidalia
- Christ Church, Dublin
- Grace Church, Sandersville
- Good Shepherd, Swainsboro
- St. Luke's, Hawkinsville
- St. Mary Magdalene, Louisville
- St. Thomas Aquinas, Baxley-Hazelhurst
- Trinity, Cochran
- Trinity, Statesboro

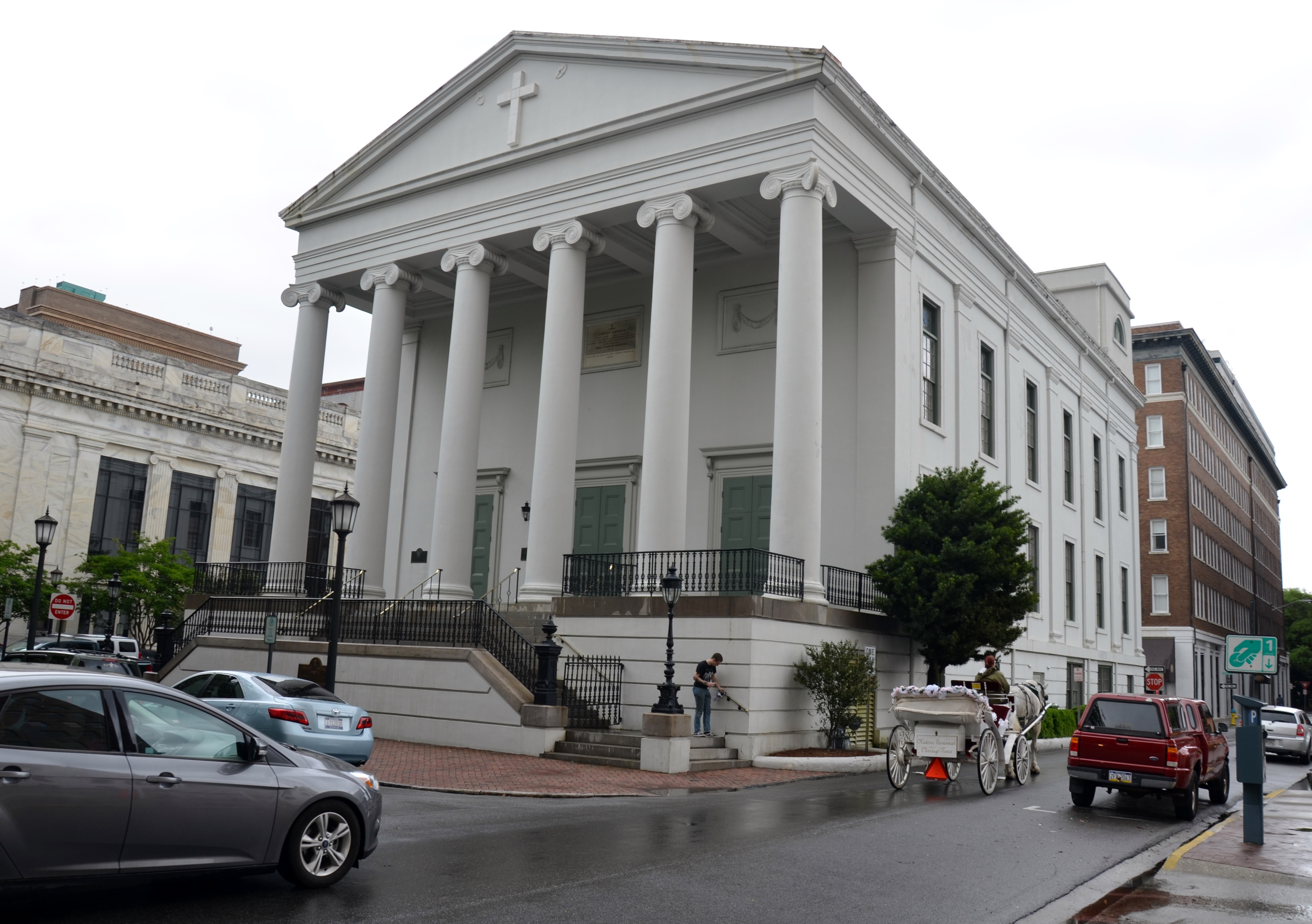
Christ Church, Savannah

Savannah Convocation

- All Saints, Tybee Island
- Christ Church, Savannah
- St. Patrick's, Pooler
- St. Bartholomew's Chapel, Burroughs
- St. Elizabeth of Hungary, Richmond Hill
- St. Francis of the Islands, Wilmington Island
- St. George's Chapel, Diocesan House, Savannah
- St. George's, Savannah
- St. John's, Savannah
- St. Luke's, Rincon
- St. Matthew's, Savannah
- St. Peter's, Skidaway Island
- St. Paul the Apostle, Savannah
- St. Philip's, Hinesville
- St. Thomas, Isle of Hope

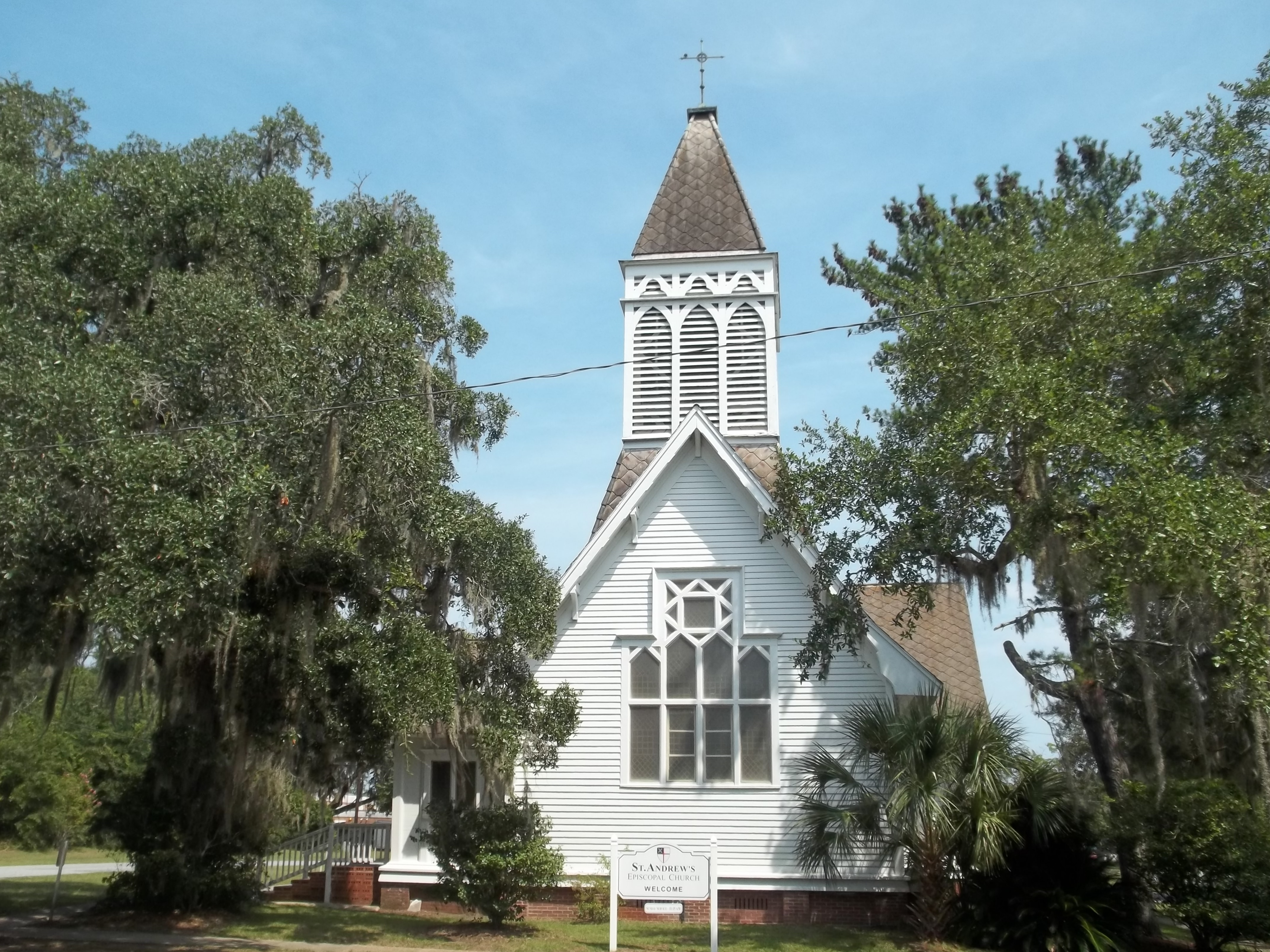
St. Andrew's Episcopal Church, Darien

Southeastern Convocation

- Christ Church, St. Mary's
- Christ Church, St. Simons Island
- Good Shepherd, Pennick
- Grace Church, Waycross
- Holy Nativity, Saint Simons Island
- King of Peace, Kingsland
- Our Savior at Honey Creek, Waverly
- St. Andrew's, Darien
- St. Andrew's, Douglas
- St. Cyprian's, Darien
- St. Athanasius, Brunswick
- St. Mark's, Woodbine
- St. Mark's, Brunswick
- St. Paul's, Jesup

Southwestern Convocation

- All Saints, Thomasville
- Christ Church, Valdosta
- Christ the King, Valdosta
- Good Shepherd, Thomasville
- St. Barnabas, Valdosta
- St. James, Quitman
- St. John's, Bainbridge
- St. Margaret of Scotland, Moultrie
- St. Thomas, Thomasville

== See also ==
- Historical list of bishops of the Episcopal Church in the United States of America
