= John W. Beckwith =

American bishop

The Right Reverend John Watrous Beckwith
- Bishop of Georgia
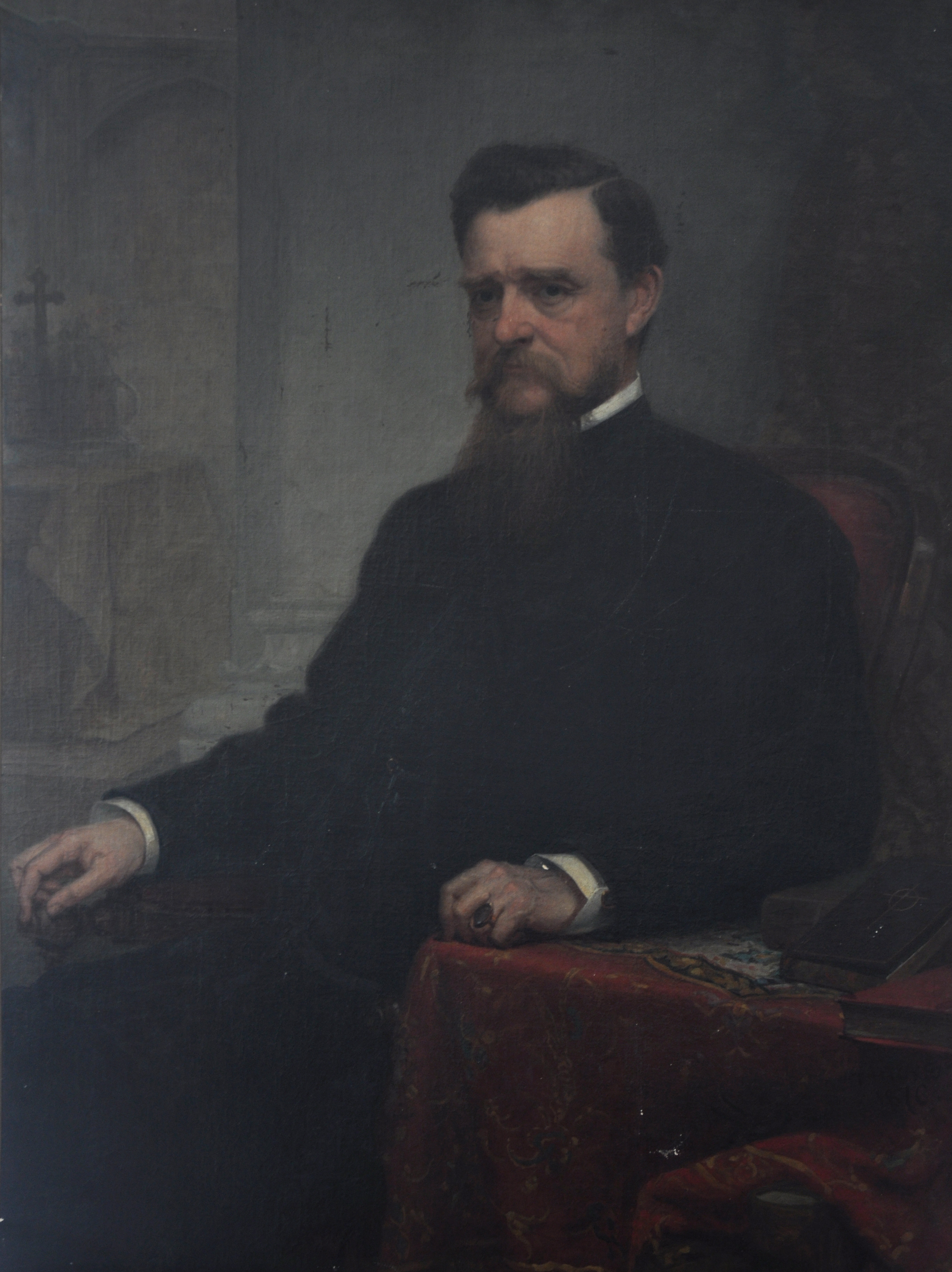
- Church: Episcopal Church
- Diocese: Georgia
- Elected: May 11, 1867
- In office: 1868–1890
- Predecessor: Stephen Elliott
- Successor: Cleland Kinloch Nelson

Orders
- Ordination: May 20, 1855 by Thomas Atkinson
- Consecration: April 2, 1868 by William Mercer Green

Personal details
- Born: February 9, 1831 Raleigh, North Carolina, United States
- Died: November 23, 1890 (aged 59) Atlanta, Georgia, United States
- Buried: Bonaventure Cemetery
- Denomination: Anglican
- Parents: John Beckwith & Margaret Stanly
- Spouse: Ella Brockenbrough
- Children: 5

John Watrous Beckwith (February 9, 1831 – November 23, 1890) was the Second Bishop of Georgia. He was the 86th bishop of the Episcopal Church in the United States of America (ECUSA).

== Life ==
Beckwith graduated from Trinity College, Hartford in 1852 and two years later, he was ordained as a deacon and later priest in the Episcopal Church. Before the American Civil War, he served in North Carolina and Maryland. During the war, he served as a chaplain on the staff of Confederate General William J. Hardee. Following the war, Beckwith served churches in Demopolis, Alabama and Deer Creek, Mississippi. Late in 1865, he accepted a call to serve Trinity Episcopal Cathedral in New Orleans as its rector. He served that church for three years before being elected as the second Bishop of the Diocese of Georgia.

He was consecrated as Bishop on April 2, 1868, in St. John's Church, Savannah. Beckwith served as Bishop of the Episcopal Diocese of Georgia for 23 years during the difficult period of reconstruction. There were 31 churches in the diocese at the time of his consecration. At his death, there were 53 churches and five missions. From 1887-1888, Bishop Beckwith spent five months abroad preaching in Anglican Churches in Italy, France, England, Egypt and Palestine.

His final annual report came at the sixty eighth convention of the Episcopal Diocese of Georgia held in Milledgeville in May 1890. In his address at that convention he told the delegates;

I have not for years looked forward to the future with as much hope as now....all over the Diocese, among clergy and laity, there seems to be an increase in aggressive work on churchly lines.

Beckwith died on November 23, 1890.
