= Stephen Elliott (bishop) =

American bishop

The Right Reverend Stephen Elliott
- Bishop of Georgia
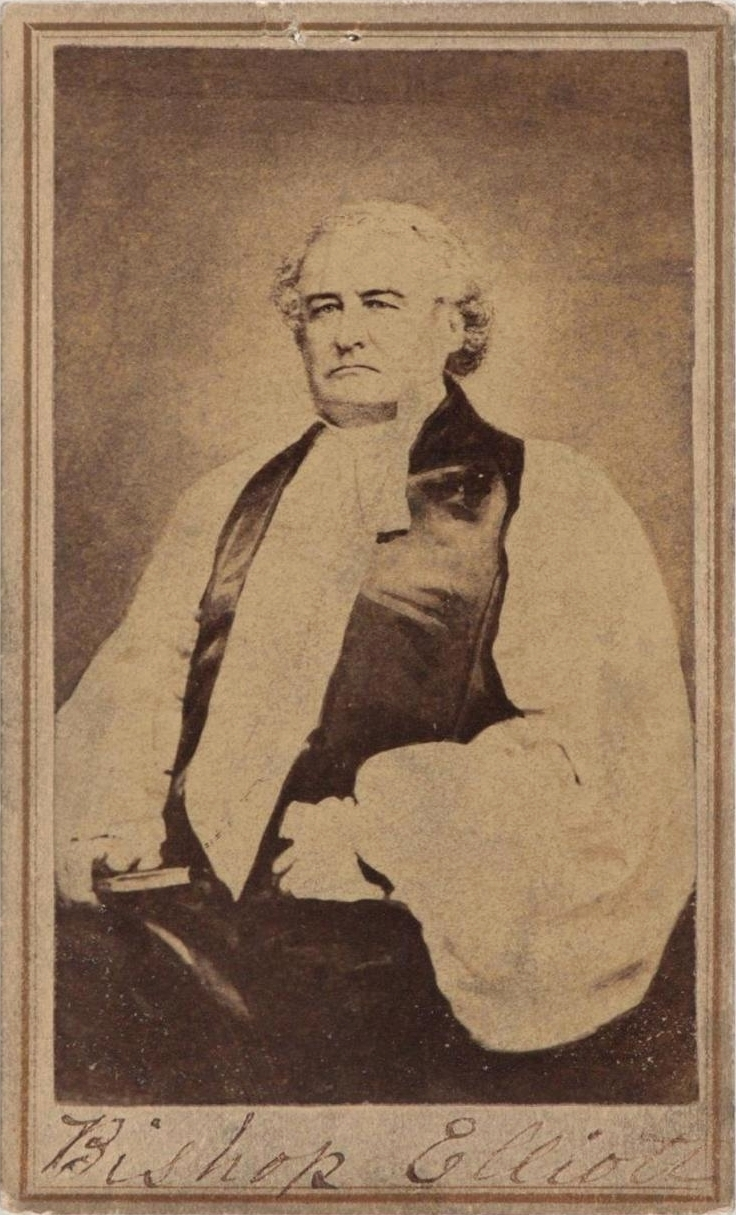
- Church: Episcopal Church
- Diocese: Georgia
- Elected: 1840
- In office: 1841–1866
- Successor: John W. Beckwith

Orders
- Ordination: May 1836
- Consecration: February 28, 1841 by William Meade

Personal details
- Born: August 31, 1806 Beaufort, South Carolina, United States
- Died: December 21, 1866 (aged 60) Savannah, Georgia, United States
- Buried: Laurel Grove Cemetery
- Denomination: Anglican
- Parents: Stephen Elliott & Esther Habersham
- Spouse: Mary Gibbes Barnwell; Charlotte Bull Barnwell
- Children: 8

Stephen Elliott (August 31, 1806 – December 21, 1866) was the 37th bishop of the Protestant Episcopal Church in the United States of America. He was the first Bishop of Georgia and Provisional Bishop of Florida. He was also the first and only Presiding Bishop of the Protestant Episcopal Church in the Confederate States of America.

== Early life and career ==
He was born on August 31, 1806, in Beaufort, South Carolina, the son of Stephen Elliott the botanist. He attended Harvard and graduated in 1825 from South Carolina College, where he was president of the Clariosophic Society. He studied law and practiced in Charleston (where he was one of the founders of the Forensic Club) and Beaufort, South Carolina from 1827 until 1833.

Elliott had a conversion experience during a sermon by Presbyterian evangelist Daniel Baker (1791–1857) at the Parish Church of St. Helena in Beaufort, South Carolina. He became a candidate for holy orders in the Episcopal Church in 1833, was ordained a deacon on February 15, 1835, by Bishop Nathaniel Bowen of South Carolina, and a priest the following year. A professor of sacred literature and revealed religion, Elliot taught at South Carolina College from 1835 to 1841.

== Family life ==
Elliott married his cousin, Mary Gibbes Barnwell, a daughter of Colonel Robert W. Barnwell, on Nov. 18, 1828. After her death, he married another cousin, Charlotte Bull Barnwell, daughter of John G. Barnwell and granddaughter of two Revolutionary army generals, General John Barnwell and of Stephen Bull. Among their children were Robert W. B. Elliott (1840–1887), missionary bishop to West Texas; John Gibbes Barnwell Elliott, M. D.; R. Habersham Elliott; and their youngest, the novelist Sarah Barnwell Elliott (1848–1928). (Note: a common misconception, frequently published, especially online, is that Confederate Brigadier-General Stephen Elliott Jr. (1832–1866) was the son of Elliott. The General was the son of Elliott's first cousin, another Stephen Elliott (1804–1866).)

== Episcopacy ==
In 1840 he was chosen first bishop of the Diocese of Georgia, and after his consecration, February 28, 1841, became rector of St. John's Church, Savannah. In 1844 he became provisional bishop of the Episcopal Diocese of Florida, to be succeeded in 1851 by Francis Huger Rutledge, the first bishop of that diocese.

Elliott was committed to education. In 1845 he resigned the rectorship of St. John's to take charge of the Female Institute at Montpelier, Georgia, which he had founded several years earlier. He assumed the management and with it a large debt, and resided in Montpelier, 1845–53. He was also instrumental, with Bishops Leonidas Polk and James Hervey Otey, in founding The University of the South at Sewanee, Tennessee.

A supporter of slavery, in July 1855 Elliott explained this in a letter to Amelia Matilda Murray, which he agreed she could publish:

For nearly a hundred years the English and American Churches have been striving to civilize and Christianize Western Africa, and with what result? Around Sierra Leone, and in the neighborhood of Cape Palmas, a few natives have been made Christians, and some nations have been partially civilized; but what a small number in comparison with the thousands, nay, I may say millions, who have learned the way to Heaven and who have been made to know their Savior through the means of African slavery! At this very moment there are from three to four millions of Africans, educating for earth and for Heaven in the so vilified Southern States—learning the very best lessons for a semi-barbarous people—lessons of self-control, of obedience, of perseverance, of adaptation of means to ends; learning, above all, where their weakness lies, and how they may acquire strength for the battle of life. These considerations satisfy me with their condition, and assure me that it is the best relation they can, for the present, be made to occupy.

After Georgia and other southern states seceded, many of the Christian denominations in the U.S. split into Northern and Southern branches, a division that sometimes persists today. The Episcopal Church was no different. When the Episcopal Church in the Confederate States of America split off, Stephen Elliott became its Presiding Bishop. He later became known for his funerary oration for the "Fighting Bishop" Leonidas Polk at Saint Paul's Church during the Atlanta campaign. Elliott, who held enslaved people, supported the Southern cause in the American Civil War.

Largely through the efforts of Elliott and his friend John Henry Hopkins, Bishop of Vermont, who was the Presiding Bishop of the U.S. Episcopal Church, the Northern and Southern branches reunited after the Civil War. Both men considered this crucial to the survival of the Church and the nation.

== Death and legacy ==
Elliott died on December 21, 1866, in Savannah, Georgia. He was buried at Laurel Grove Cemetery (north) in Savannah. John W. Beckwith succeeded him as bishop of Georgia.
