= Anna Alexander =

Episcopal deaconess and saint (1865–1947)

Anna Ellison Butler Alexander
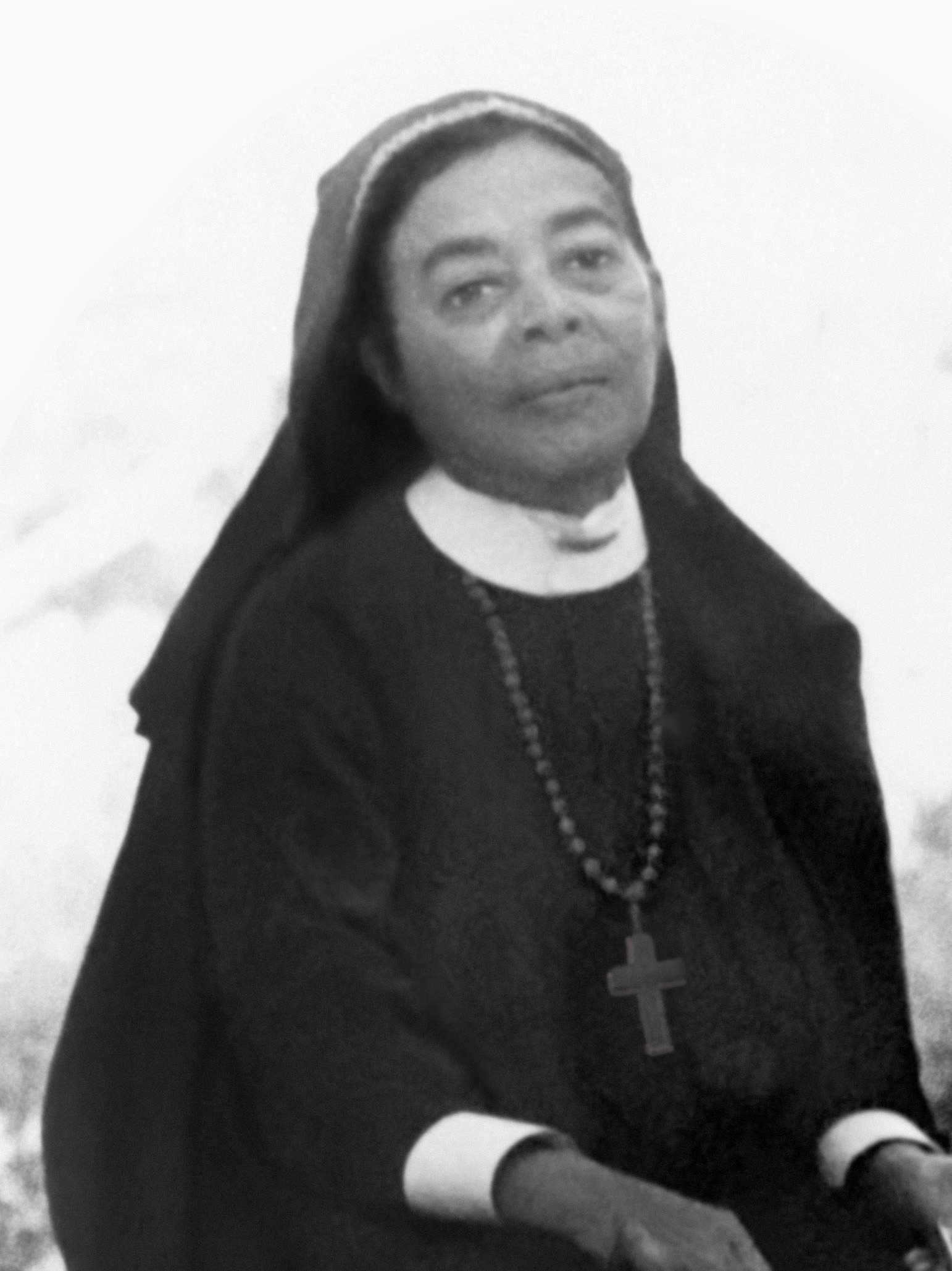

Deaconess
- Born: circa 1865; St. Simons Island, Glynn County, Georgia, United States
- Died: 1947; Pennick, Glynn County, Georgia
- Venerated in: Episcopal Church
- Feast: September 24

Anna Ellison Butler Alexander (c. 1865 – September 24, 1947) was the first and only African-American consecrated a deaconess in the Episcopal Church. She served in the Episcopal Diocese of Georgia during her entire career, and may be remembered in the Calendar of saints on September 24.

== Early life ==
Alexander was born shortly after the American Civil War on St. Simon's Island, Georgia to former slave Daphne Alexander and her husband James Alexander (known by his nickname Aleck). Her parents had married in 1841 and Anna became their eleventh and last child. Her birth date was not recorded, and she later gave various different dates, in part because she feared that she would be forbidden to continue to work in her final years as too old (later diocesan records list it as 1878 and her death certificate lists 1880).

Her father Aleck was the personal servant and aide of his master, Pierce Mease Butler (1810–1861), who owned several plantations inherited from his grandfather, founding father and U.S. Senator Pierce Butler. Aleck Alexander had learned to read and write (despite state laws to the contrary) from Butler's wife, the British actress Fanny Kemble.

Alexander later wrote that her part-Native American paternal grandmother had received her freedom after nursing Pierce Mease and his brother John Mease, before they assumed their grandfather's surname in order to inherit his plantations.

Her maternal grandmother was from Madagascar, and her mother was the result of a rape by a white overseer. Fanny Kemble became estranged from her husband after witnessing such activities at his plantations, particularly by that overseer. Kemble wrote the anti-slavery Journal of a Residence on a Georgian Plantation in 1838-1839, published in 1863 and which helped influence British public opinion against the Confederate cause.

The Alexander family soon moved to Pennick, Georgia to take advantage of land south of the Altamaha River previously held by poor whites who had moved further south to Florida to obtain land under the Southern Homestead Act of 1866. Her father became a carpenter-builder and a community leader. In addition to building his own family's houses, and helping others learn that trade, Aleck Alexander helped build a school for the community and used his own land as an experimental farm.

== Career ==
Anna first taught at the public school in Pennick. Later, she moved to Darien, Georgia, at the mouth of the Altamaha River, where her sister Mary founded a school affiliated with St. Cyprian's Episcopal Church, and all three sisters taught. Anna also visited Brunswick, Georgia and St. Athanasius' Episcopal Church. In 1894, with the cooperation of the Brunswick priest, Anna founded a mission in Pennick, while still teaching at Darien during the week, making a 40-mile round trip by boat and foot.

The mission faltered when Anna accepted a position at St. Paul's Normal and Industrial School (as well as enrolled in the new teachers college there) in Lawrenceville, Virginia. In 1897, she returned to Pennick and revitalized the mission. The congregation was renamed Church of the Good Shepard, and Alexander also started a school. She supported herself by taking in sewing, and managed to buy property in 1902, where her brother Charles Alexander and other men then erected a church.

In 1907, bishop Cleland Kinloch Nelson addressed the second annual meeting of the diocese's council of colored churchmen, held at the Church of the Good Shepherd. He described Alexander as a "devout, godly and respected colored woman" and consecrated her as a deaconess. She became the first and only African-American deaconess. She worked in Altamaha River area for the rest of her life, teaching not only academic subjects, but also moral values. Her Sunday School students always donated pennies to those worse off then themselves. When an earthquake devastated Tokyo-Yokohama in Japan in 1923, Alexander's mission diverted their own building funds to aid the overseas victims, donating more proportionally to assist other needy people than any other church in the diocese.

The diocese of Georgia split in 1907 and Nelson chose to associate with the new Episcopal Diocese of Atlanta. His successor in the Diocese of Georgia, Frederick Focke Reese, excluded African-Americans from church government in the diocese, and extended almost no diocesan financial support to African-Americans. This forced Alexander and others to make do, as well as seek support from outside the diocese, including from the Episcopal Board of Missions. During the bad crop years of the late 1920s through the Great Depression, Alexander continued to work in her hardscrabble community, whose members built the current wooden church building in 1928. In 1934 only 2 of the 30 students could pay the nickel per week school fee.

Alexander became the agent for governmental and private aid for both black and white residents, and enlisted neighbors of both races to help. Before his death, Reese recognized her decades of service. During the summers of her last decade, Alexander cooked for Camp Reese, the then-new (and now former) Diocesan summer camp on St. Simons Island, and brought small groups of African-American boys and girls – who were formally barred as campers but could enjoy the area. In her later years, Alexander worked alongside other deaconesses, including Madeline Dunlap of Chicago.

== Legacy ==
Alexander died on September 24, 1947, and was buried at the cemetery at Camp Reese. In 1998, she was recognized as a saint by the Episcopal Diocese of Georgia and its Bishop Henry Louttit Jr. Her diocese began advocating for larger recognition in the Episcopal Church. In 2004, she was reinterred at Good Shepherd Church in Pennick, which she had founded and where she had worked for many years, although now visiting priests only hold services twice a month.

The General Convention of the Episcopal Church, meeting in Salt Lake City, Utah preliminarily recognized Alexander's service as a deaconess and teacher in 2015. A short documentary released by the Episcopal Diocese of Georgia in 2018 explains her life. Also in 2018, Presiding Bishop Michael Curry visited Pennick, Georgia and recognized her ministry. She was the winner of the "Golden Halo" in Lent Madness 2018, an educational tool hosted by Forward Movement Publications featuring the saints of the calendar of the Episcopal Church. She was added to the Episcopal Church's calendar of saints that year.

On March 24, 2019, two churches in the Episcopal Diocese of California merged, naming their new congregation 'St. Anna's Episcopal Church' in her memory.
