= Saint Paul's Church (Augusta, Georgia) =

Historic church in Georgia, United States

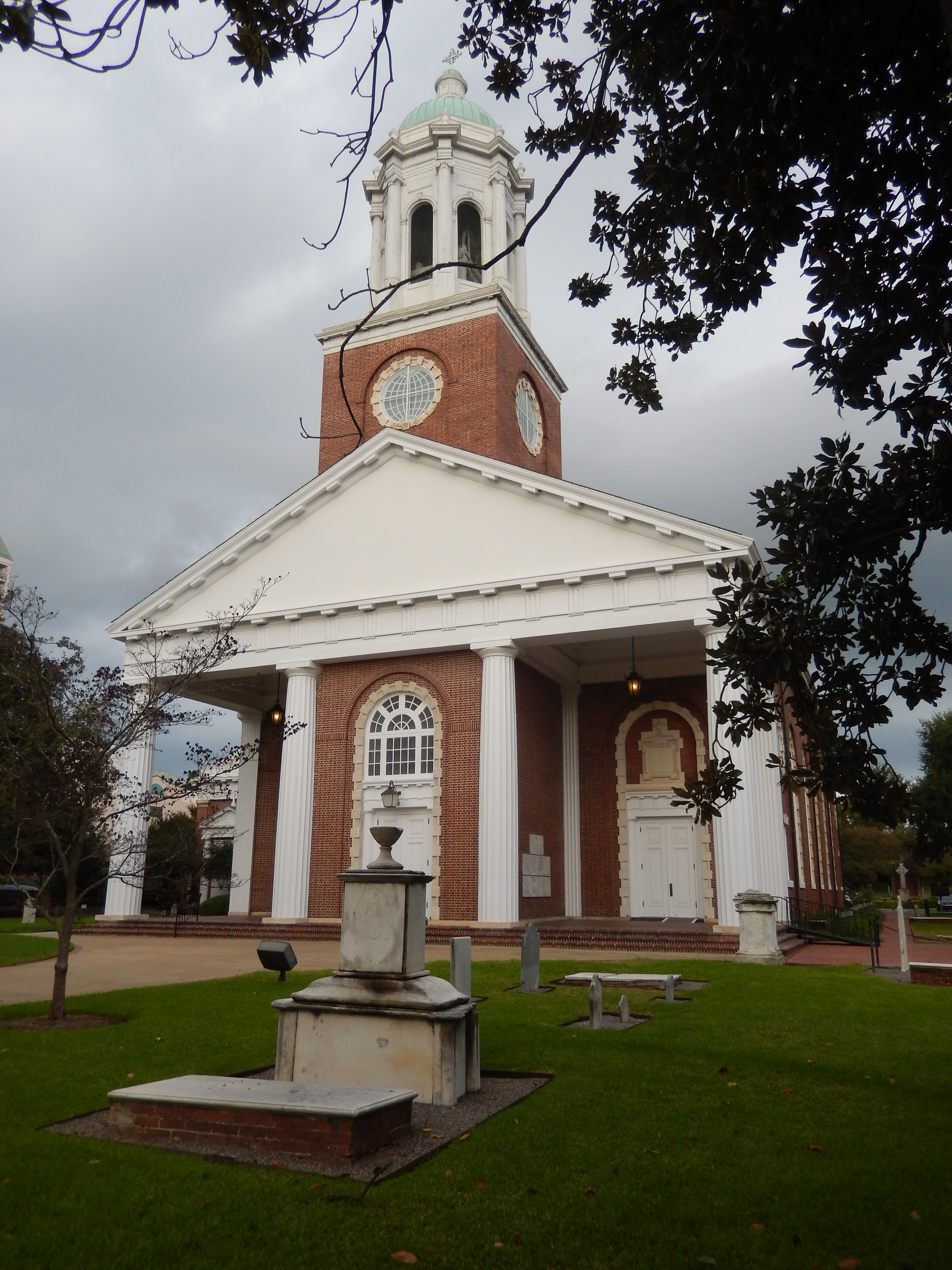
- View of Saint Paul's Church from courtyard 2

Religion
- Affiliation: Episcopal Church
- District: Episcopal Diocese of Georgia
- Ecclesiastical or organisational status: parish

Location
- Location: Augusta, Georgia, United States of America
- Interactive map of Saint Paul's Church

Architecture
- Style: Colonial
- Saint Paul's Church (Episcopal)
- U.S. National Register of Historic Places
- Location within Georgia Location within the United States
- Location: 6th and Reynolds Sts., Augusta, Georgia
- Coordinates: 33°28′33″N 81°57′40″W
- Area: 2 acres (0.81 ha)
- Built: 1751
- NRHP reference No.: 73000642
- Added to NRHP: April 11, 1973

Website
- Saint Paul's Church

Saint Paul's Church is a historic Episcopal church in downtown Augusta, Georgia, adjacent to Riverwalk Augusta. A member of the Episcopal Diocese of Georgia, Saint Paul's conducts its worship services using the 1979 Book of Common Prayer. The church, located on the corner of 6th and Reynolds Streets, is the oldest church congregation in Augusta. It was established in 1750 by the Church of England at the site of Fort Augusta. There have been five churches on the site. The current church building, which combines features of Federal architecture with those of the Georgian and Greek Revival styles, was designed by Henry Ten Eyck Wendell and dedicated in 1920. It can seat up to 600 people.

In 2018, the church reported 816 members; in 2023, it reported 502 members. No membership statistics were reported in 2024 national parochial reports. Plate and pledge financial support reported by the church in 2024 was $884,349. Average Sunday Attendance (ASA) reported in 2024 was 198 persons. This was a relative decrease on ASA of 285 in 2017.

Saint Paul's is an active congregation. Its three Sunday worship services at 8 a.m., 11 a.m., and 5:30 p.m. include celebration of the Lord's Supper, known in the Episcopal Church as the Holy Eucharist. The 8 am service (no music) uses Rite I of the 1979 Book of Common Prayer. The 11 am choral service uses Rite II of the 1979 Book of Common Prayer. The 5:30 Celtic Communion is a meditative healing service that includes quiet music by local musicians. The nave is open to the public for private prayer from 9 a.m. to 3 p.m, Monday through Thursday, and 9 a.m. to noon, Friday. A guestbook and historical brochures are available in the narthex.

Christian formation classes for all ages are held each Sunday from 9:30 to 10:30 a.m. Nursery care is offered from 9 a.m. to 12:30 p.m. The 11 a.m. service is broadcast on local radio at WGAC 580 AM Radio and WGAC 95.1 FM Radio. Listeners can hear the service on-line at http://wgac.com/listen-live/

Saint Paul's has a long history of service and hospitality to the wider Augusta community and to the Episcopal Diocese of Georgia. It is a member of Downtown Cooperative Church Ministries, a consortium of downtown Augusta churches which provides food, medical, housing, and financial assistance to those with limited means. The Saint Paul's Outreach Committee raises funds to support local charities. In cooperation with Golden Harvest Food Bank, the parish's bi-monthly Manna Pantry program provides nutritionally healthy foods to local residents dealing with food insecurity.

Through its River Room event facility, Saint Paul's provides a site for a wide range of community activities, including wedding receptions, concerts, school proms, training seminars, fund-raising galas, and meetings of local community and business organizations. Saint Paul's also hosts athletes competing in the Augusta Ironman Triathlon each September, providing a pasta dinner for competitors, a gear drop for the swim event, drinks and snacks for participants and volunteers, and a quiet space for spiritual preparation.

Since 1988, Saint Paul's has hosted Tuesday's Music Live, the nation's largest luncheon concert series, which brings nationally and internationally known musicians to perform for local audiences. From September to May, the 13-concert series annually attracts roughly 5,000 attendees with a variety of classical, jazz, soft pop, and choral performers. The free concerts are supported by a mix of business and foundation grants and individual donations.

== Historical overview ==
Saint Paul's Church was the third church associated with the Church of England established in the colony of Georgia after Saint John's Church, Savannah, and Christ Church, Frederica. There have been five Saint Paul's churches at the corner of 6th and Reynolds Street, and formal religious services associated with the name Saint Paul's Church in Augusta have been held since 1751.

The mother church of Augusta, Saint Paul's began in 1749 when the President and Assistants of Georgia's governing council approved the petition of Augusta resident James Fraser for permission to build a church and burial ground.

Residents of the town erected a small, half-timbered chapel beside Fort Augusta, and appealed to the Society for the Propagation of the Gospel in Foreign Parts (S.P.G.) to send a minister. At its dedication, this chapel was named Saint Paul's for London's historic St. Paul's Cathedral. Services were led by Lay Readers until the arrival of the Rev. Jonathan Copp two years later. Copp brought with him a baptismal font, a gift from the S.P.G., which can be seen in the narthex of the current church.

In 1758, the Colonial Assembly of Georgia divided the colony into eight parishes, with the parish in which Augusta was located being named for "The Parish Church and Burial Place of Saint Paul's."

The original church building was of Gothic Revival architecture, but was severely damaged when it housed refugees during the French and Indian Wars. The second church was destroyed during the American Revolutionary War. A third church, commissioned by the Trustees of the Academy of Richmond County, was built by William Mead in 1786. The fourth church was designed by architect John Lund in the colonial architecture style. It burned to the ground during the Great Augusta Fire of March 1916, which also destroyed the homes of many Saint Paul's parishioners of the time.

The Episcopal Diocese of Georgia was founded at Saint Paul's on February 24, 1823. During the Civil War, the First General Council of the Episcopal Church in the Confederate States was held at Saint Paul's from November 12–22, 1862, during which time the delegates adopted a Constitution and Canons for the Protestant Episcopal Church in the Confederate States and elected Stephen Elliott, Bishop of Georgia, as its Presiding Bishop.

The Rev. John E. Hines (1910–1997) carried the commitment to racial reconciliation and social justice he demonstrated as rector of Saint Paul's from 1937 to 1941 into his role as Bishop of Texas and then as Presiding Bishop of the Episcopal Church from 1965 to 1974.

In 1968, Saint Paul's Church was the site of another historic event, when the House of Bishops of the Episcopal Church met in joint session with the Bishops of the Anglican Church of Canada. It was the first time in the history of the Episcopal Church that the House of Bishops held a formal meeting in which the Bishops of another Anglican church took part. Convened by Presiding Bishop John E. Hines, who was returning to visit the parish he had served thirty years before, the meeting involved discussions of social problems faced by both the American and Canadian Church, as well as relations with the Roman Catholic and Orthodox Churches.

== Saint Paul's Churchyard ==
The churchyard of Saint Paul's holds the graves of William Few, signer of the U.S. Constitution, and George Mathews," governor of Georgia, who served as a member of the U.S. House of Representatives. The body of Confederate general Leonidas Polk, who was also Episcopal Bishop of Louisiana, was buried at Saint Paul's following his death near Marietta, Georgia, in June 1864. Bishop Polk's remains were interred beneath the chancel window of the fourth church until they were removed to Christ Church, New Orleans, in 1945. A plaque commemorating his life is affixed to the wall to the left of the Saint Paul's altar. Joseph Wheeler, the Confederate general born in Augusta, was a member of Saint Paul's. Confederate General James Longstreet, who was raised in Augusta, was confirmed at Saint Paul's by Bishop Stephen Elliott on June 30, 1864.

Saint Paul's churchyard was a burial site for slaves and free people of color until their remains were moved in 1825 to the newly opened Cedar Grove Cemetery, which was designated by local government as the burying ground for Augusta residents classified as non-white. As a sign of affection and respect, black sextons Abel Wright (died December 25, 1887) and Benjamin Whitehead (died April 2, 1894), who served the parish of Saint Paul's for many years, were buried in the churchyard at their deaths.

== Historic Records of Saint Paul's Church ==
Thanks to a 2020 sub-grant from the Digital Library of Georgia (DLG), a number of records pertinent to the history of Saint Paul's Church are now available to the public through the DLG internet portal (dlg.usg.edu). (Search on St. Paul's Church, Augusta, Ga.) The records were selected for general interest and their relevance to genealogical and historical research. The materials include two volumes of parish registers for the years 1820-1868 and 1868-1913 with a separate 1-volume index covering both volumes; a 1-volume parish register for the years 1913-1937 (with index at the front); and a register of marriage certificates for the years 1904-1942. The Saint Paul's Vestry minutes for the years 1855-1923 in two volumes record information about salaries and wages for church staff, building and maintenance expenses, including loans and insurance, gifts and legacies, legal actions, and special events. Additional materials include a 1906 history of Saint Paul's Church by the Rev. Chauncey Camp Williams, Rector of Saint Paul's from 1878-1906, and a two-volume collection of miscellaneous documents detailing important people, dates, and events in parish history and lists of church furnishings and other gifts and their donors.

== The Bells of Saint Paul's ==
The fourth Saint Paul's Church (1820) had a belfry with a single bell cast by England's Whitechapel Bell Foundry, which also cast Philadelphia's Liberty Bell and London's Big Ben. The 1820 bell was irretrievably damaged when the belfry collapsed in the fire of March 1916 that destroyed the fourth church. The remains of the 1820 bell were dug up from the ground under the burned church and saved until they could be incorporated into a new chime of eleven bells for the fifth church. This new chime weighing 12,187 pounds was cast by the Meneely Bell Foundry of New York. The new bells were dedicated in a solemn service by the Rev. George Sherwood Whitney in January 1924. The first use of the bells for church services occurred Sunday, June 1, 1924. The chime played the Doxology, also known as the Old 100th. The great bell is inscribed, "To the Glory of God and in Thanksgiving for the Restoration of this Church. Destroyed by Fire, 1916, Glory to God in the Highest." The reverse side reads, "The Living to the Church I call, To the grave I summon all."

The new chime was rung by levers and ropes until it was electrified in 1956. It was then controlled by solenoids and metal cable attached to the clappers. In 1985, the old swinging clappers were replaced by fix-mounted clappers cast by the Paccard Foundry in France. The bells were also provided with computer controls which allowed them to be programmed to play at various times. Soon after the chime was enhanced by the addition of three bells cast by the Paccard Foundry to match the original eleven, bringing the total number of bells to fourteen. The 1985 computer has since been replaced by a touch screen controller located next to the organ console with a fiber-optic cable connection to the belfry.

== Rectors of Saint Paul's Church ==
- The Rev. Jonathan Copp, 1751–1754
- The Rev. Samuel Frink, 1765–1767
- The Rev. Edward Ellington, 1767–1770
- The Rev. James Seymour, 1771–1781
- The Rev. Hugh Palmer, ?-1789
- The Rev. Adam Boyd, 1790–1799
- The Rev. Hugh Smith, 1818–1832
- The Rev. Edward Eugene Ford, 1832–1862
- The Rev. William H. Clarke, 1862–1878
- The Rev. Chauncey Camp Williams, 1878–1906
- The Rev. George Sherwood Whitney, 1906–1924
- The Rev. Julius A. Schaad, 1924–1931
- The Rev. John Armstrong Wright, 1931–1937
- The Rev. John Elbridge Hines, 1937–1941
- The Rev. E. Hamilton West, 1941–1948
- The Rev. Charles F. Schilling, 1948–1962
- The Rev. C. Edward Reeves, 1963–1974
- The Rev. Roderic L. Murray, 1975–1980
- The Rev. Peter Glyn Thomas, 1981–1989
- The Rev. Donald A. Fishburne, 1990–2001
- The Rev. Richard E. Sanders, 2002–2012
- The Rev. George Daniels Muir, 2013–2021 (Priest-in-charge)
- The Rev. Dr. Eric C. Biddy, 2021-present

== Organists and Choirmasters of Saint Paul's Church ==
- James Hewitt, 1822-?
- Louisa V. Marshall, 1838–1859
- Ella Ernenputsch, 1859–1861
- E. Clarke Ilsley, 1861–1865
- M. E. Webber, 1866–1871
- John Weigand, 1871–1892
- W. F. Harris, 1892–1895
- H. I. Solomon, 1895–1899
- J. W. Crosley, 1899–1907
- Leo B. Pomeroy, 1901–1909
- Louis Sayre, 1911–1919
- George Johnson, 1919–1926
- George Craig, 1925–1944
- Bernard Carpenter, 1931–1953
- Sarah Alvater, 1955–1962
- Preston Rockholt, 1962–1964
- Everett Summerall, 1964–1982
- Keith Shafer, 1983–present

== Notable Burials ==
- Commodore Oliver Bowen, (1741–1800), Revolutionary War naval officer who in 1775 captured a British vessel laden with gunpowder near the port of Savannah.
- William Few, (1748–1828), represented Georgia at the Constitutional Convention and in the United States Congress (body moved here in 1973).
- Robert Forsyth,(1754–1794), U.S. Marshal, was the first federal law enforcement official to be killed in the line of duty, and father of Georgia governor John Forsyth.
- Ambrose Gordon,(1751–1804), Revolutionary War soldier and great-grandfather of Juliette Gordon Low (1860–1927), founder of the Girl Scouts.
- William Longstreet,(1760–1814), inventor and operator of steam-powered engines and cotton gins, father of Georgia writer Augustus Baldwin Longstreet and grandfather of Confederate General James Longstreet (1821–1904).
- George Mathews (1739–1812) was Governor of Georgia and U.S. Representative.

== See also ==
- History of Augusta, Georgia
