= William L. Hargrave =

Episcopal bishop of South Florida

The Right Reverend William Loftin Hargrave
- Bishop of Southwest Florida
- Church: Episcopal Church
- Diocese: Southwest Florida
- Elected: 1969
- In office: 1969–1975
- Successor: E. Paul Haynes
- Previous post: Suffragan Bishop of South Florida (1961-1969)

Orders
- Ordination: June 29, 1932 by John Durham Wing
- Consecration: December 21, 1961 by Arthur C. Lichtenberger

Personal details
- Born: November 10, 1903 Wilson, North Carolina, United States
- Died: October 15, 1975 (aged 71) Cocoa, Florida, United States
- Buried: St. Luke's Episcopal Church and Cemetery (Courtenay, Florida)
- Denomination: Anglican
- Parents: Benjamin Worthington Hargrave & Frances Lenox Daniel
- Spouse: Minnie Frances Whittington
- Children: 4

William Loftin Hargrave (November 10, 1903 – October 15, 1975) was suffragan bishop of the Episcopal Diocese of South Florida, serving from 1961 to 1969. He served subsequently as first bishop of the new Episcopal Diocese of Southwest Florida from 1969 to 1975.

== Early life, education and law career ==
Hargrave was born on November 10, 1903, in Wilson, North Carolina, the son of Benjamin Worthington Hargrave (1861-1907) and Frances Lenox Daniel (1867-1939). He studied at the Atlanta Law School where he earned his Bachelor of Laws in 1924. He was admitted to State Bar of Georgia in 1925 and served as assistant trust officer at the Miami Bank & Trust Co. (Fla.) between 1924 and 1926. He then was an associate at the firm Shuns & Bowen in Miami between 1926 and 1927. He left the law profession and studied at the Virginia Theological Seminary and graduated with a Bachelor of Divinity in 1932. In 1955 he also earned his Master of Sacred Theology from the University of the South. He was awarded an honorary Doctor of Divinity by the Virginia Seminary and the University of the South in 1962.

== Ordained ministry ==
Hargrave was ordained deacon in June 1931 and priest in June 1932 by Bishop John Durham Wing of South Florida. His first post was as rector of St Mark's Church in Cocoa, Florida, and priest-in-charge of St Luke's Church in Courtenay, Florida and of St Philip's Mission in Merritt Island, Florida. He retained these posts till 1943. During that time, on February 13, 1939, he married Minnie Frances Whittington, and together had four children. In 1943, he became rector of St Andrew's Church in Fort Pierce, Florida, while in 1945, became rector of the Church of the Holy Comforter. Between 1948 and 1953, he served as chaplain and president of Porter Military Academy in Charleston, South Carolina 1948-1953. He then became Canon to the Ordinary and Actuary and Executive Secretary of the Diocese of South Florida on September 1, 1953, a post he retained till 1961.

== Bishop ==
On October 20, 1961, Hargrave was elected Suffragan bishop of South Florida on the third ballot, during a special convention held in St Luke's Cathedral, Orlando, Florida. He was consecrated on December 21, 1961 by Presiding Bishop Arthur C. Lichtenberger, in St Luke's Cathedral. As Suffragan bishop, he was assigned to minister in the west coast of the diocese by the diocesan bishop Henry I. Louttit Sr. After the Diocese of South Florida was divided into three separate dioceses in 1969, Hargrave became the first bishop of Southwest Florida. He retired on July 31, 1975 and died on October 15 that same year of a heart attack at his home in Cocoa, Florida.
