= William Gray =

William, Willie, Bill, or Billy Gray may refer to:

== Arts and entertainment ==
- William S. Gray (film editor) (1896–1946), American film editor
- William Gray (screenwriter), Canadian screenwriter
- Billy Gray (comedian) (1904–1978), American comedian, comedy club owner, and actor
- Billy Gray (actor) (born 1938), American actor who portrayed teenager Bud Anderson on TV's Father Knows Best

== Politics and law ==
- William Gray (Massachusetts politician) (1750–1825), American politician and merchant
- William Gray (Conservative politician) (1814–1895), British mill owner and Conservative Member of Parliament (MP) for Bolton 1857–1874
- William Gray (Canadian politician) (1862–1916), politician in Ontario, Canada
- William Gray (Lord Provost) (1928–2000), Lord Provost of Glasgow, 1972–1975
- William Gray (New Mexico politician) (born 1940), American state legislator in New Mexico
- William B. Gray (1942–1994), American attorney and politician
- William Bain Gray (1886–1949), British colonial administrator and civil servant
- William Blair Gray (1833–1904), Scottish-born Australian politician
- William E. Gray, state legislator in Arkansas
- William H. Gray (Mississippi politician) (1841–1919), Baptist minister and state legislator in Mississippi
- William H. Gray (Oregon politician) (1810–1889), American pioneer of Oregon Country
- William H. Gray III (1941–2013), American Democrat from Pennsylvania
- William Hill Gray (1805–1890), Virginia lawyer, planter and politician
- Wilfred James "Bill" Gray, Australian government official, specialist in Aboriginal matters
- William Percival Gray (1912–1992), U.S. federal judge

== Religion ==
- William Gray (priest) (1874–1960), Anglican clergyman
- William Crane Gray (1835–1919), American religious figure; first bishop of the Episcopal Church's Missionary Jurisdiction
  - SS William Crane Gray, a Liberty ship
- William Henry Gray (1825–1908), Scottish minister

== Sports ==
=== American football ===
- Bill Gray (offensive lineman) (1922–2011), American offensive lineman for the Washington Redskins
- Bill Gray (Canadian football) (fl. 1960s), Canadian football running back
- Bill Gray (American football coach) (fl. 1990s–2000s), American football and tennis coach

=== Baseball ===
- Bill Gray (baseball) (1871–1932), American Major League Baseball player, 1890–1898
- Dolly Gray (baseball) (William Denton Gray, 1878–1956), American Major League Baseball pitcher for the Washington Senators, 1909–1911
- Willie Gray (fl. 1920–1937), American baseball player

=== Other sports ===
- William Gray (jockey) (fl. 1870), British Champion flat jockey
- William Gray (cricketer) (1864–1898), English cricketer
- Bill Gray (footballer) (1882–1916), Scottish footballer with Partick Thistle and Southampton in the 1900s
- Bill Gray (rugby union), (1932–1993), New Zealand rugby union player
- Billy Gray (footballer) (1927–2011), English footballer
- Billy Gray (horse trainer) (died 2016), horse trainer

== Writing and academics ==
- William Cunningham Gray (1830–1901), American newspaper publisher, editor, and columnist
- William Forbes Gray (1874–1950), Scottish journalist and author
- William G. Gray (1913–1992), English occultist, author and mystic
- William M. Gray (1929–2016), American professor of atmospheric science
- William S. Gray (1885–1960), American academic, authority on the teaching of reading

== Other fields ==
- William John Gray, 13th Lord Gray (1754–1807), Scottish nobleman and soldier
- W. H. Gray (William Henry Gray, 1808–1896), pioneer colonist of South Australia
- William Gray (inventor) (1850–1903), American inventor and entrepreneur, inventor of the payphone and the baseball chest protector
- William Gray (architect) (1851–1927), American architect
- William Gray (RAF officer) (1898–?), First World War flying ace
- William Fairfax Gray (1787–1841), American lawyer and land agent in the Republic of Texas
- one of the founders of William Gray & Company, a British shipbuilding company, established in 1863
- Bill Gray, co-founder (with his wife) of Bill Gray's, an American chain of fast-food restaurants based in New York State

== See also ==
- William Grey (disambiguation)
- William Grayson (disambiguation)
- Gray (surname)
