= Rogers Sanders Harris =

American prelate of the Episcopal Church

The Right Reverend Rogers Sanders Harris
- Bishop of Southwest Florida
- Church: Episcopal Church
- Diocese: Southwest Florida
- Elected: 1989
- In office: 1989–1997
- Predecessor: E. Paul Haynes
- Successor: John Lipscomb
- Previous post: Suffragan Bishop of Upper South Carolina (1985-1989)

Orders
- Ordination: April 5, 1958 by Clarence Alfred Cole
- Consecration: March 9, 1985 by John Allin

Personal details
- Born: February 22, 1930 Anderson, South Carolina, United States
- Died: November 15, 2017 (aged 87) West Columbia, South Carolina, United States
- Denomination: Anglican
- Parents: Wilmot Louis Harris & Sarah Elizabeth Sanders
- Spouse: Anne Marshall Sterwart
- Children: 3

Rogers Sanders Harris (February 22, 1930 – November 15, 2017) was an American prelate of the Episcopal Church, who served as the third Bishop of Southwest Florida from 1989 till 1997.

== Early life and education ==
Harris was born on February 22, 1930, in Anderson, South Carolina, the son of Wilmot Louis Harris and Sarah Elizabeth Sanders. He studied at the University of the South, from where he earned a Bachelor of Arts in 1952, a Master of Divinity in 1957 and an honorary Doctor of Divinity in 1986. He was also awarded a Doctor of Ministry in 1977 and a Doctor of Divinity in 1986, both from the Virginia Theological Seminary. Harris was First lieutenant in the United States Marine Corps between 1952 and 1954 during the Korean War. He married Anne Marshall Sterwart on March 28, 1953, and together had three children.

== Ordained ministry ==
Harris was ordained deacon on August 6, 1957, and priest on April 5, 1958, by Clarence Alfred Cole, Bishop of Upper South Carolina. He served as vicar of Grace Church in Ridge Spring, South Carolina, and vicar of St Paul's Church in Batesburg, South Carolina between 1957 and 1959. In 1959, he became rector of the Church of the Good Shepherd in Greer, South Carolina. In 1969, he transferred to St Christopher's Church in Spartanburg, South Carolina to serve as its rector, where he remained till 1985.

== Bishop ==
Harris was elected Suffragan Bishop of Upper South Carolina and was consecrated on March 9, 1985, by Presiding Bishop John Allin. In 1989, he was elected Bishop of Southwest Florida and was installed as diocesan bishop on September 9, 1989, at the Cathedral of St Peter. He served as vice-president of Province IV of Episcopal Church between 1991 and 1994, and then president of the same province from 1994 till 1997. He was also a member of the Presiding Bishop's Council of Advice from 1994 till 1997. Harris retired in 1997.
