= Martin J. Bram =

The Right Reverend Martin Julius Bram
- Suffragan Bishop of South Florida
- Church: Episcopal Church
- Diocese: South Florida
- Elected: April 10, 1951
- In office: 1951–1956
- Successor: William F. Moses

Orders
- Ordination: November 1929 by Philip Cook
- Consecration: September 21, 1951 by Henry I. Louttit Sr.

Personal details
- Born: September 25, 1897 New York City, U.S.
- Died: February 9, 1956 (aged 58) Orange City, Florida, U.S.
- Denomination: Anglican
- Parents: Martin Samuel Bram & Ellen Chambers
- Spouse: Mabel Harris Bowler

Martin Julius Bram (September 25, 1897 - February 9, 1956) was an American prelate of the Episcopal Church, who served as Suffragan Bishop of South Florida from 1951 till 1956.

== Early life and education ==
Bram was born in New York City on September 25, 1897, the son of Martin Samuel Bram and Ellen Chambers. He was educated at the New York City public schools. He studied at Hobart College and graduated with a Bachelor of Arts magna cum laude in 1926. He then enrolled at the Virginia Theological Seminary and earned his Bachelor of Divinity in 1929. He was awarded a Doctor of Divinity by the University of the South.

== Ordained ministry ==
Bram was ordained deacon in June 1928 and priest in November 1929 by Bishop Philip Cook of Delaware. He then became rector of St Paul's Church in Georgetown, Delaware, while in 1933, he became rector of the Church of the Holy Cross in Sanford, Florida. While there, he married Mabel Harris Bowler on June 17, 1935. Between 1941 and 1945, he served as rector of St Andrew's Church in Tampa, Florida, while between 1945 and 1951, he was rector of Holy Trinity Church in West Palm Beach, Florida. In 1950, he was appointed the secretary of the Florida Council of Churches.

== Suffragan Bishop of South Florida ==
On April 10, 1951, Bram was elected on the second ballot, as the Suffragan Bishop of South Florida, during a diocesan convention held in Daytona Beach, Florida. He was consecrated on September 21, 1951, by Henry I. Louttit Sr. of South Florida. He was also active in civil and welfare work. Bram died of a heart attack while attending a retreat at the Good Shepherd Monastery in Orange City, Florida, on February 9, 1956.
