= E. Paul Haynes =

American bishop

The Right Reverend Emerson Paul Haynes
- Bishop of Southwest Florida
- Church: Episcopal Church
- Diocese: Southwest Florida
- Elected: April 27, 1974
- In office: 1975–1988
- Predecessor: William L. Hargrave
- Successor: Rogers Sanders Harris
- Previous post: Coadjutor Bishop of Southwest Florida (1974-1975)

Orders
- Ordination: September 30, 1948 by Henry Hobson
- Consecration: September 21, 1974 by John Allin

Personal details
- Born: March 10, 1918 Marshfield, Indiana, United States
- Died: May 30, 1988 (aged 70) St. Petersburg, Florida, United States
- Denomination: Anglican (prev. Evangelical United)
- Parents: Ora Wilbur Haynes & Lydia Pearl Walsh
- Spouse: Helen Charlene Elledge
- Children: 3

Emerson Paul Haynes (March 10, 1918 - May 30, 1988) was second bishop of the Episcopal Diocese of Southwest Florida, serving from 1975 to 1988.

== Early life and education ==
Haynes was born on March 10, 1918, in Marshfield, Indiana, the son of the Reverend Ora Wilbur Haynes (1895–1953) and Lydia Pearl Walsh (1891–1952). He attended the local high school in New Albany, Indiana. At the age of 17, on November 15, 1935, he married Helen Charlene Elledge and together they had three children. He then studied at the Indiana Central University and graduated with a Bachelor of Arts in 1942. The same university awarded him a Doctor of Humane Letters in 1976. He also attended the Bonebrake Theological Seminary and earned a Bachelor of Divinity in 1946.

== Ordained ministry ==
Haynes was ordained a minister in the Evangelical United Brethren Church in 1937. He joined the Episcopal Church, and was ordained deacon in April 1948 and priest on September 30, 1948, by Bishop Henry Hobson of Southern Ohio. He served as rector of Holy Trinity Church in Cincinnati from 1948 till 1953. In 1953, he became rector of All Saints Church in Portsmouth, Ohio, while in 1957, he transferred to Calvary Church in Cincinnati to serve as its rector. In 1959 he became canon chancellor of St Luke's Cathedral in Orlando, Florida, and in 1964, he became rector of St Luke's Church in Fort Myers, Florida. He served on the Standing Committee and Diocesan Council and as Deputy to the Provincial Synod and General Conventions of 1970 and 1973.

== Episcopacy ==
On April 27, 1974, Hayes was elected Coadjutor Bishop of Southwest Florida on the ninth ballot, during a diocesan convention. He was consecrated on September 21, 1974, by Presiding Bishop John Allin, in St Peter's Cathedral, St. Petersburg, Florida. He succeeded as diocesan bishop upon the retirement of Bishop Hargrave on July 31, 1975. Haynes died in office on May 30, 1988, in St Anthony's Hospital, St. Petersburg, Florida, after suffering a bleeding gastric ulcer, followed by a heart attack.
