= William F. Moses =

American prelate of Episcopal church

The Right Reverend William Francis Moses
- Suffragan Bishop of South Florida
- Church: Episcopal Church
- Diocese: South Florida
- Elected: May 23, 1956
- In office: 1956–1961
- Predecessor: Martin J. Bram
- Successor: William L. Hargrave

Orders
- Ordination: February 1925 by Henry J. Mikell
- Consecration: October 18, 1956 by Henry Knox Sherrill

Personal details
- Born: February 6, 1898 Atlanta, Georgia, United States
- Died: July 31, 1961 (aged 63) London, England
- Denomination: Anglican
- Parents: Frank Hamilton Moses & Cora Mina Thibadeau
- Spouse: Cornelia Chaffee
- Children: 3

William Francis Moses (February 6, 1898 - July 31, 1961) was an American prelate of the Episcopal Church, who served as Suffragan Bishop of South Florida from 1956 till 1961.

== Early life and education ==
Moses was born on February 6, 1898, in Atlanta, Georgia, the son of Frank Hamilton Moses and Cora Mina Thibadeau. He was educated at the public high school of Atlanta and then at the Georgia School of Technology. On April 2, 1923, he married Cornelia Chaffee, and together had three children. In 1924, he graduated in theology from the University of the South, and was awarded a Doctor of Divinity by the same university in 1956.

== Ordained ministry ==
Moses was ordained deacon in June 1924 and priest in February 1925 by Bishop Henry J. Mikell of Atlanta. He was in charge of the Church of St James in Cedartown, Georgia, and of the Church of the Ascension in Cartersville, Georgia, between 1924 and 1929. From 1929 till 1930, he served as priest-in-charge of Grace Church in Sheffield, Alabama, and St John's Church in Tuscumbia, Alabama. In 1930, he became rector of All Saints' Church in Lakeland, Florida, a post he retained till 1952. From 1952 till 1956, he was rector of the Church of the Redeemer in Sarasota, Florida.

== Suffragan Bishop ==
On May 23, 1956, Moses was elected Suffragan Bishop of South Florida during a diocesan convention, and was consecrated on October 18, 1956, in the Church of the Redeemer in Sarasota, Florida, by Presiding Bishop Henry Knox Sherrill. Bishop Moses' episcopacy was short lived like his predecessor's, after suffering a heart attack on July 26, 1961, during a trip to England. He died in a London hospital on July 31, 1961.
