= Cameron Mann (bishop) =

American bishop (1851-1932)

The Right Reverend Cameron Mann
- Bishop of South Florida
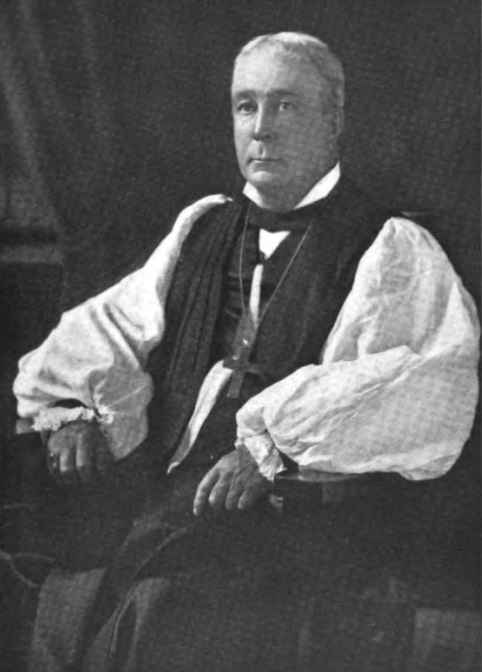
- Church: Episcopal Church
- Diocese: South Florida
- Elected: October 1913
- In office: 1913–1932
- Predecessor: William Crane Gray
- Successor: John Durham Wing
- Previous post: Missionary Bishop of North Dakota (1901-1913)

Orders
- Ordination: November 11, 1876 by Arthur Cleveland Coxe
- Consecration: December 4, 1901 by Daniel S. Tuttle

Personal details
- Born: April 3, 1851 New York City, New York, United States
- Died: February 8, 1932 (aged 80) Winter Park, Florida, United States
- Buried: Glenwood Cemetery, Watkins Glen, New York
- Denomination: Anglican
- Parents: Duncan Cameron & Caroline Brother Schuyler
- Spouse: Mary Le Cain
- Children: 4

Cameron Mann (April 3, 1851 - February 8, 1932) was the third bishop of North Dakota and the first bishop of South Florida in The Episcopal Church. He was the author of The Comments at the Cross: Six Lent Sermons.

== Early life and education ==
Mann was born in New York City on April 3, 1851, the son of the Reverend Duncan Cameron Mann and Caroline Brother Schuyler. He was educated at Hobart College and earned his Bachelor of Arts in 1870 and a Master of Arts in 1874. He also studied at the General Theological Seminary, from where he graduated in 1873. He was awarded a Doctor of Divinity from Hobart in 1888, the General Seminary in 1902 and the University of the South in 1914. Rollins College awarded him with a Doctor of Laws in 1927.

== Ordained ministry ==
Mann was ordained deacon in 1873 and became deacon-in-charge at St Luke's Church in Branchport, New York. In 1875, he became curate at St Peter's Church in Albany, New York. Between 1875 and 1882, he served as rector of St James' Church in Watkins Glen, New York. During that time, on November 11, 1876, he was ordained priest by Bishop Arthur Cleveland Coxe of Western New York. On June 14, 1882, he married Mary Le Cain of Cincinnati, and together had four children. That same year, he became rector of Grace Church in Kansas City, Missouri, and remained there through 1901.

== Bishop ==
Mann was elected Missionary Bishop of North Dakota on October 2, 1901, during a General Convention held in San Francisco. He was consecrated on December 4, 1901, in Grace Church, Kansas City (now Grace and Holy Trinity Cathedral), by Presiding Bishop Daniel S. Tuttle. In October 1913, he was elected Missionary Bishop of Southern Florida, while in 1922, with the creation of the Diocese of South Florida, he became the first diocesan bishop. He died in office on February 8, 1932, in Winter Park, Florida.
