= William Folwell =

William Folwell may refer to:

- William Watts Folwell (1833–1929), educator, writer and historian; president of the University of Minnesota
- William H. Folwell (born 1924), American Episcopal bishop
