= Harry W. Shipps =

The Right Reverend Harry Woolston Shipps D.D.
- Bishop of Georgia
- Church: Episcopal Church
- Diocese: Georgia
- Elected: September 15, 1983
- In office: 1985–1994
- Predecessor: Paul Reeves
- Successor: Henry I. Louttit
- Previous post: Coadjutor Bishop of Georgia (1984-1985)

Orders
- Ordination: January 17, 1959 by Alfred L. Banyard
- Consecration: January 6, 1984 by John Allin

Personal details
- Born: January 28, 1926 Bordentown, New Jersey, United States
- Died: November 17, 2016 (aged 90) Savannah, Georgia, United States
- Buried: St Paul's Church, Savannah, Georgia
- Denomination: Anglican
- Spouse: Louise Huntington
- Children: 4

Harry Woolston Shipps (January 28, 1926 – November 17, 2016) was the eighth Bishop of Georgia. He was the 778th bishop of the Episcopal Church in the United States of America (ECUSA).

== Early life and career ==
Shipps was born in Bordentown, New Jersey, and graduated in 1942 from William MacFarland High School. In 1946, Shipps graduated from the New York State Maritime Academy.

Commissioned as an officer in the United States Navy, Lt. Shipps sailed on a troop ship, and after his discharge, he sailed with the Grace Line Steamship Company. He was recalled to active duty during the Korean War and assigned to a naval facility in Savannah, Georgia, but later sailed on ships in the North Atlantic. On May 16, 1953, he married Louise Huntington Rosenberger.

== Ministry ==
After his military discharge, Shipps attended the School of Theology at The University of the South and received his B.D. degree there in 1958. That same year, on May 20, he was ordained as a transitional deacon by Bishop Albert R. Stuart. He was ordained to the priesthood on January 17, 1959, by Bishop Alfred L. Banyard. Shipps served in parish ministry in Albany, Savannah and Augusta, Georgia.

He also served the Episcopal Diocese of Georgia, before he was elected Bishop, as diocesan secretary, editor of the diocesan newspaper, on the diocesan council, member and president of the standing committee, and as a deputy to three General Conventions. He was the Dean of the Augusta Convocation at the time of his election. Shipps was elected bishop coadjutor on September 15, 1983, on the 11th round of balloting from a field of 35 nominees.

== Episcopacy ==
Shipps was consecrated as the eighth Bishop of Georgia. He had been elected as a bishop coadjutor to succeed Paul Reeves on Reeves's retirement. Shipps served as diocesan bishop from 1985 through 1995. During Shipps' tenure as diocesan bishop, the Diocese made headlines when a former Assembly of God minister, Stan White, led his independent congregation to join the Episcopal Church en masse, and as Christ the King Church, Valdosta, became a congregation in the Episcopal Diocese of Georgia. During his episcopacy, women were first ordained in the Diocese of Georgia. He was succeeded by Henry I. Louttit.

Shipps died on November 17, 2016.

== Sources ==
- Episcopal Church Service article on Shipps' election
- Mine Eyes Have Seen the Glory
- Augusta Chronica article on Shipps' election
