= Henry I. Louttit =

The Reverend Henry I. Louttit, Jr. D.D.
- Bishop of Georgia
- Church: Episcopal Church
- Diocese: Georgia
- Appointed: September 16, 1994
- In office: 1995–2010
- Predecessor: Harry W. Shipps
- Successor: Scott Benhase

Orders
- Ordination: April 25, 1964 by Albert R. Stuart
- Consecration: January 21, 1995 by Edmond L. Browning

Personal details
- Born: June 13, 1938 West Palm Beach, Florida, U.S.
- Died: December 31, 2020 (aged 82)
- Denomination: Anglican
- Parents: Henry I. Louttit Sr. & Amy Cleckler
- Spouse: Jayne Arledge Northway
- Children: 3
- Education: University of the South
- Alma mater: Virginia Theological Seminary

Henry Irving Louttit, Jr. (June 13, 1938 – December 31, 2020) served as the ninth Bishop of Georgia. He was the 901st bishop of the Episcopal Church in the United States of America (ECUSA).

== Early and family life ==
Henry I Louttit, Jr. was born June 13, 1938, in West Palm Beach, Florida, the son of Rev. Henry I. Louttit, who became the bishop of South Florida, and then chose to become the bishop of Central Florida after the growing diocese was split in three. Young Henry Louttit was a Phi Beta Kappa graduate of the University of the South. On June 14, 1962, he married Jayne Arledge Northway. Louttit graduated from Virginia Theological Seminary in 1963.

== Ministry ==
Ordained to the diaconate in June of that year, Louttit was ordained to the priesthood in April 1964. He served as the Vicar of Trinity Church in Statesboro, Georgia then as the rector of Christ Church Valdosta where he served from April 1, 1967, until his election to the episcopacy.

His father, Henry I. Louttit, Sr., was the last bishop of the Diocese of South Florida before it was divided into three new dioceses.

== Episcopacy ==
Henry I. Louttit, Jr. was consecrated as the ninth bishop of the Episcopal Diocese of Georgia on January 21, 1995. He had been elected to succeed Harry W. Shipps on Shipps' retirement. Louttit had long been interested in liturgical renewal and was involved in the creation of the Book of Common Prayer 1979. Under Louttit's leadership, the Episcopal Diocese of Georgia has taken renewed interest in starting new congregations. He authorized the formation of the missions of St. Stephen's, Leesburg; Church of the Holy Comforter, Martinez; King of Peace, Kingsland; St. Luke's, Rincon, and the Episcopal Church of Our Savior at Honey Creek. He also worked with restarting the congregations in Hawkinsville and Pooler. Rt. Rev. Louttit in 1998 recognized the ministry of deaconess Anna Alexander in the Altamina River area, which the General Convention of the Episcopal Church, meeting in Salt Lake City, Utah in 2015 also recognized, as would Presiding Bishop Michael Curry in 2017.

Loutitt served on the Board of Regents of the University of the South, chairing the Regent's Committee on the School of Theology. He served in many other leadership roles including being president of the Georgia Christian Council (Ecumenical meeting place for the major churches in our state), and a member of the Board of Trustees of the Virginia Theological Seminary.

On February 9, 2008, Louttit announced his retirement effective on the consecration of the tenth Bishop of Georgia. Scott A. Benhase succeeded Louttit on his January 23, 2010 consecration.

Louttit died on December 31, 2020, at the age of 82.
