= Paul Haynes =

Paul Haynes may refer to:

- Paul Haynes (ice hockey) (1910–1989), Canadian ice hockey forward
- Paul Haynes (American football) (born 1969), American football coach
- Paul Haynes (basketball) (born 1982), American basketball player
- E. Paul Haynes (1918–1988), bishop of the Episcopal Diocese of Southwest Florida

== See also ==
- Paul Haines (disambiguation)
