= John Wing =

John Wing may refer to:

- John Wing Jr., Canadian comedian and author
- John Durham Wing, American Episcopal bishop
- John Ian Wing, student whose anonymous letter to the International Olympic Committee altered the closing parade of the Summer Olympics
