= Dabney Tyler Smith =

American Episcopal bishop (born 1953)

The Right Reverend Dabney Tyler Smith
- Bishop of Southwest Florida
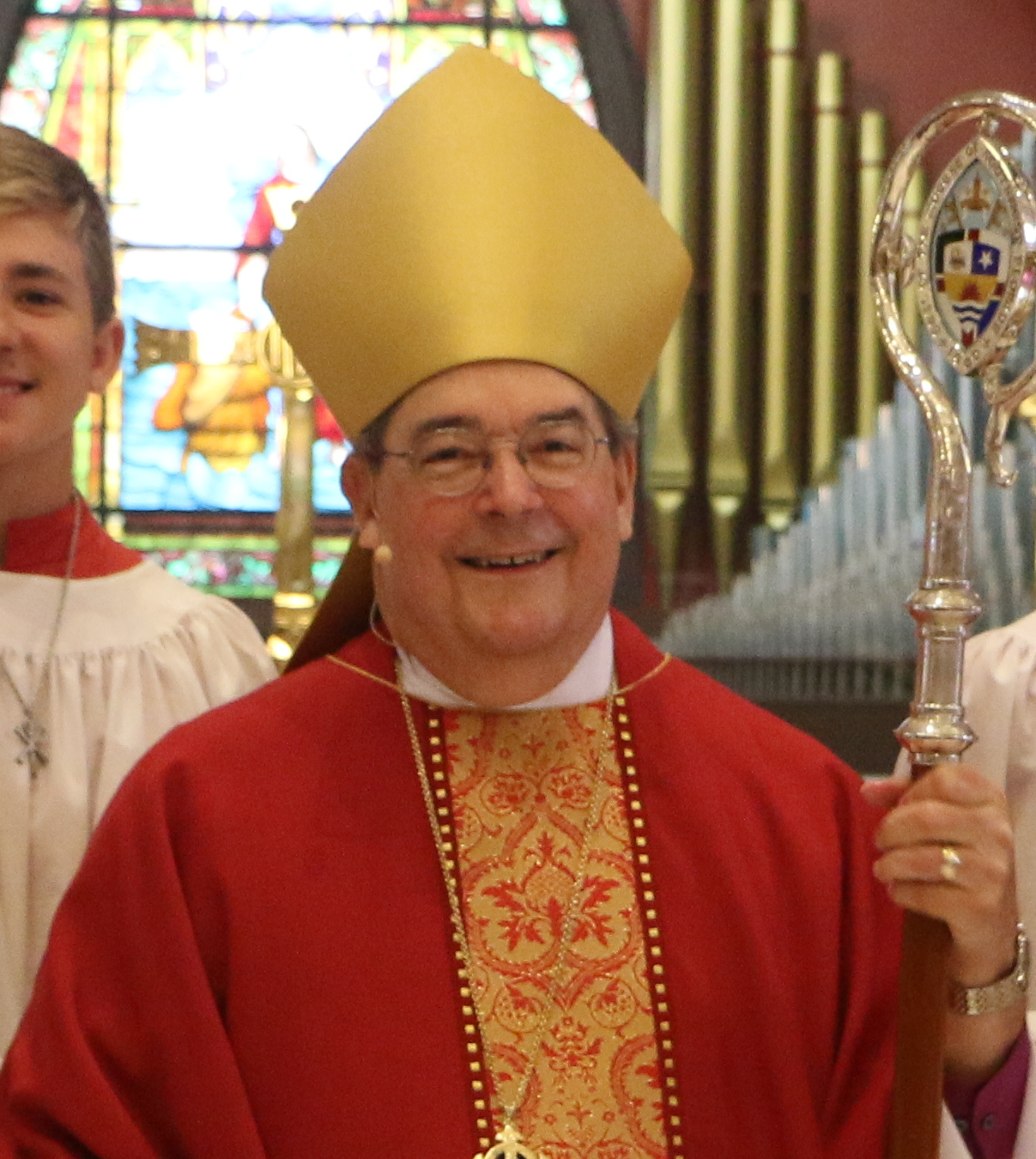
- Church: Episcopal Church
- Diocese: Southwest Florida
- Elected: December 9, 2006
- In office: 2007–2022
- Predecessor: John Lipscomb
- Successor: Douglas Scharf
- Previous post: Coadjutor Bishop of Southwest Florida (2007)

Orders
- Ordination: 1987
- Consecration: March 10, 2007 by Clifton Daniel

Personal details
- Born: December 7, 1953 Texas, United States
- Died: October 26, 2024 (aged 70)
- Denomination: Anglican
- Parents: Dorsey & Dorothy Smith
- Spouse: Mary Wallis Smith
- Children: 5

Dabney Tyler Smith (December 7, 1953 – October 26, 2024) was the fifth bishop of the Episcopal Diocese of Southwest Florida. Bishop Smith retired in December 2022.

== Biography ==
Smith was born in Texas and raised in Florida, where his father, Dorsey Smith, served as priest. He received a doctorate of ministry from Seabury-Western Theological Seminary in 1999. He also has degrees from the University of South Florida and Nashotah House, where he served on the board of trustees. He also served on the Board of Regents of Sewanee: The University of the South.

He was consecrated on March 10, 2007 at the Cathedral of St. Jude the Apostle in St. Petersburg. (Saint Jude, a Catholic cathedral, had a larger seating capacity than the Episcopal Cathedral Church of Saint Peter.) On May 1, 2015, he was nominated for presiding bishop of The Episcopal Church.

Smith died after brief illness on October 26, 2024.

== See also ==
- List of Episcopal bishops of the United States
- Historical list of the Episcopal bishops of the United States
