= All Saints' Episcopal Church (Lakeland) =

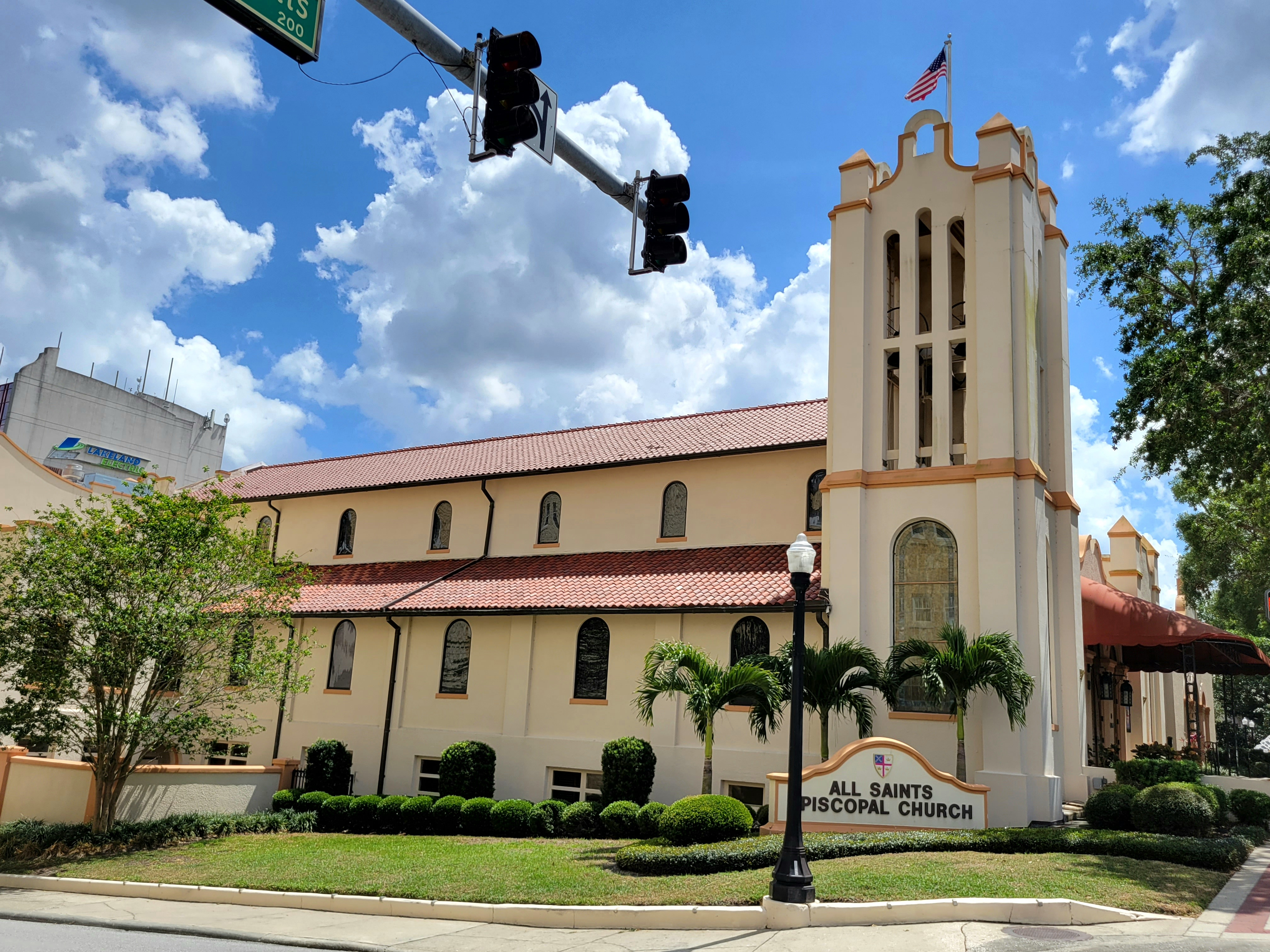

- Location within Florida
- 28°02′34″N 81°57′14″W
- Location: 202 S. Massachusetts Ave. Lakeland, Florida
- Country: United States
- Denomination: Episcopal Church in the United States of America
- Website: www.allsaintslakeland.com

History
- Founded: 1884; 142 years ago

Architecture
- Architectural type: Spanish
- Completed: 1884

Administration
- Diocese: Diocese of Central Florida

Clergy
- Bishop: The Rt. Rev. Dr. Justin S. Holcomb
- Rector: The Rev. Dr. L. Reid Hensarling

All Saints' Episcopal Church is an Episcopal Church in Lakeland, Florida, United States. It is in the Diocese of Central Florida.

== History ==
The All Saints' Episcopal Church in Lakeland, Florida originated with the All Saints' parish church built in the community of Acton, Florida in 1884. It was located between Lake Parker and Lake Bonny. The community of Acton, Florida dispersed after the freeze of 1890. The Reverend John H. Weddell petitioned Bishop Weed to move the church building to the corner of Lemon Street and Massachusetts Avenue in nearby Lakeland in 1892. A stained glass window in the northeast corner of the present nave memorializes Rev. Weddell's efforts.

By the early 1920s the Rev. G. Irvine Hiller led the parish in building a new church. The old church was torn down and the first service in the newly completed nave was conducted on February 24, 1924. This building remains in use as the oldest continuing church in the downtown area and was recognized as a part of Historic Lakeland in 1992. Four new bells were hung in the bell tower in 2006 and a new four-story building was dedicated in 2012. This new building contains classrooms, music rehearsal rooms and a new parish fellowship hall. Today, over 600 families make All Saints' Lakeland their church home.

All Saints' is in the Episcopal Diocese of Central Florida and has planted two other Episcopal church parishes in Lakeland. St. David's Episcopal Church was built in 1953 and Christ the King Episcopal Church was started in 1984.
