= William Grey =

William, Billy or Bill Grey may refer to:

== British public figures ==
- William Grey (died 1551), MP for Reading
- William Grey, 13th Baron Grey de Wilton (died 1562), military commander
- Willam Grey (died 1574), MP for Bridgnorth
- William Grey, 1st Baron Grey of Werke (1593–1674), MP during 1621–22
- Sir William Grey (governor) (1818–1878), Governor of Bengal 1866–1871, Governor of Jamaica 1874–1877
- William Grey, 9th Earl of Stamford (1850–1910), scholar and philanthropist
- William Grey Walter (1910–1977), American-born neurophysiologist, cybernetician and robotician
- William G. Gray (1913–1992), ceremonial magician, Hermetic Qabalist and writer

== Clergymen ==
- William Grey (bishop of Lincoln) (died 1436), also bishop of London
- William Grey (bishop of Ely) (died 1478), medieval English churchman
- William Henry Grey (1829–1888), African-American church leader and Reconstruction politician in Arkansas

== Characters ==
- Bill Grey, Fox's dog friend in 1993's Star Fox
- General William Grey, General from the 1996 film Independence Day
- Billy Grey, motorcycle club president in 2009's Grand Theft Auto: The Lost and Damned

== See also ==
- William Gray (disambiguation)
