= William Grayson (disambiguation) =

William Grayson (1736–1790) was a U.S. senator from Virginia.

William Grayson may also refer to:

- William Grayson Carter (died 1849), American politician from Kentucky and grandson of the senator
- William J. Grayson (1788–1863), U.S. representative from South Carolina
- William W. Grayson (1876-1941), American soldier, known for firing the shot that started the Philippine–American War
- SS William Grayson, a Liberty ship, named for the senator

== See also ==
- Will Grayson, Will Grayson, a novel by John Green and David Levithan
- William Gray (disambiguation)
