= St. Mark's Episcopal Church (Cocoa, Florida) =

Church in Florida, United States

Coordinates: 28.3535°N 80.7248°W

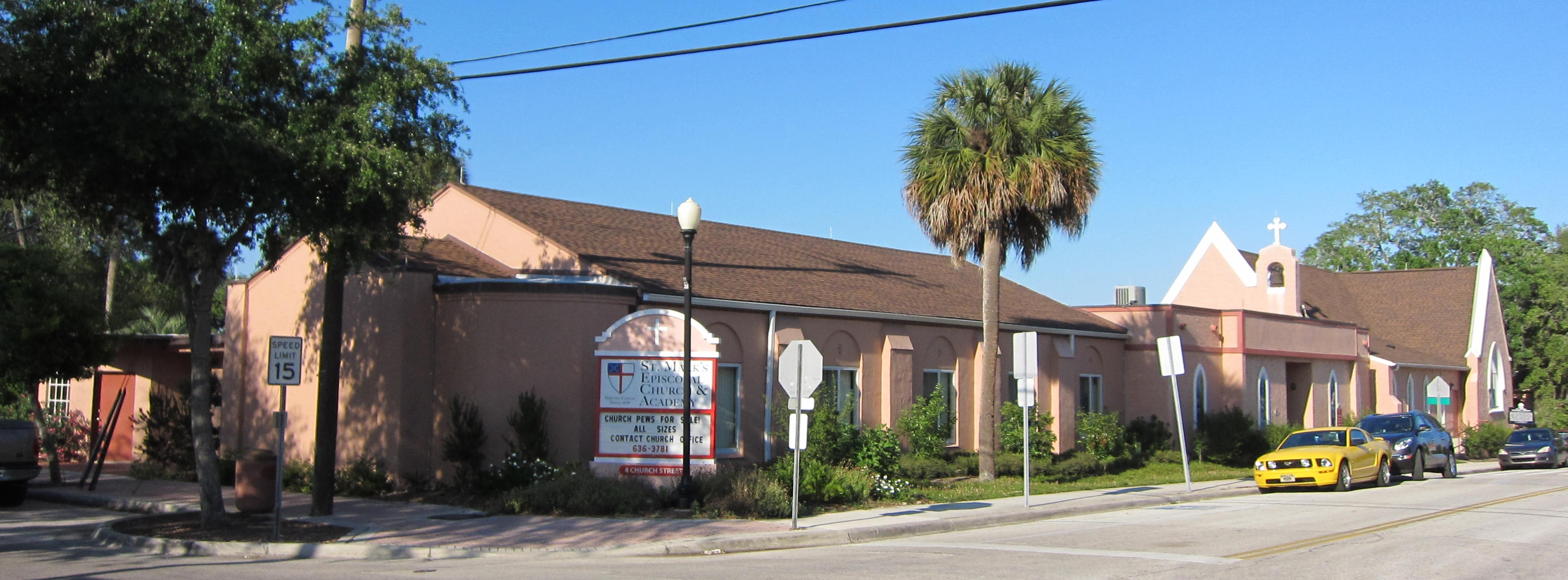
- St. Mark's Episcopal Church
- Interactive map of the St. Mark's Episcopal Church area

General information
- Architectural style: Gothic
- Location: 4 Church Street; Cocoa, Florida, United States
- Completed: Circa 1886
- Client: Episcopal Church

St. Mark's Episcopal Church is a parish of the Episcopal Church in Cocoa, Brevard County, Florida, in the Episcopal Diocese of Central Florida. It is noted for its historic church building located at 4 Church Street, built circa 1886. A parochial school, St. Mark's Episcopal Academy, was begun by the church in 1956.
