= Scott Benhase =

American Episcopal bishop

The Right Reverend Scott Anson Benhase D.Min., D.D.
- Bishop of Georgia
- Church: Episcopal Church
- Diocese: Georgia
- Elected: September 12, 2009
- In office: 2010–2020
- Predecessor: Henry I. Louttit
- Successor: Frank S. Logue

Orders
- Ordination: 1984
- Consecration: January 23, 2010 by Katharine Jefferts Schori

Personal details
- Born: June 4, 1957 (age 69) Berne Union, Ohio, United States
- Denomination: Anglican
- Parents: Carl Benhase & Annaree Potter
- Spouse: Kelly Jones
- Children: John Benhase Charley Benhase Mary Grace Benhase

Scott Anson Benhase (born June 4, 1957) is an American Episcopal bishop. He was the tenth bishop of the Episcopal Diocese of Georgia in the United States. He was elected September 12, 2009 to succeed Henry I. Louttit.

== Education ==
Benhase graduated from Loveland High School in Ohio in 1975. He received a BA in religion from DePauw University in Indiana in 1979. He graduated from the Virginia Theological Seminary in 1983. While serving as a parish priest in East Cleveland, Ohio, he earned a Master's in Urban Affairs from the Levin College of Urban Affairs at Cleveland State University. In 2009, just prior to his election as bishop, Benhase earned a Doctor of Ministry degree from the Virginia Theological Seminary. In keeping with tradition, he has also been awarded an honorary Doctor of Divinity degree by Sewanee.

== Life ==
Benhase served at parishes in Indianapolis, Indiana; Durham, North Carolina; East Cleveland, Ohio; and Charlottesville, Virginia before he was called to be rector of St. Alban's, Washington, D.C. (Diocese of Washington) in 2006. St. He is married to Kelly Jones Benhase and they have three children, John, Charley, and Mary Grace. He was a founding member of the Order of the Ascension, a dispersed Christian community with a shared commitment to parish revitalization and the struggle for justice in the church and society. He has twice served as the Presiding Officer of the Order.

== Episcopacy ==
Benhase was elected 10th Bishop of the Episcopal Diocese of Georgia on a second ballot from the field of six nominees. He received 76 votes of 146 cast in the lay order and 58 of 103 cast in the clergy order. The special election convention, held at the Dubose Porter Center in Dublin, Georgia, was the Diocese of Georgia's 188th convention. His ordination and consecration as bishop of Georgia was held January 23, 2010 at the Savannah International Trade and Convention Center.

Benhase's major initiative was the Campaign for Congregational Development, a capital campaign raising funds to enhance capacity in congregational growth and development, clergy and lay leader development, and leadership formation of youth and young adults. In his address to the diocesan convention in 2019, Benhase announced he was committing three percent of the diocesan endowment to begin a new center for racial reconciliation and healing. Frank S. Logue succeeded Benhase on his May 30, 2020 consecration.

After resiging as Bishop of the Episcopal Diocese of Georgia, Benhase served as provisional bishop in the Diocese of the Virgin Islands and as an assisting bishop in the Diocese of Florida.

== See also ==
- List of Episcopal bishops of the United States
- Historical list of the Episcopal bishops of the United States
