= John L. Said =

Episcopal bishop in Florida (1932–2019)

The Right Reverend John Lewis Said BSA
- Suffragan Bishop of Southeast Florida
- Church: Episcopal Church
- Diocese: Southeast Florida
- Elected: October 29, 1994
- In office: 1995–2003
- Other post: Assistant Bishop of Central Florida (2003-2018)

Orders
- Ordination: 1959
- Consecration: February 25, 1995 by Edmond L. Browning

Personal details
- Born: 1932 Marion, Indiana, United States
- Died: January 5, 2019 (age 86) Port St. Lucie, Florida, United States
- Buried: Church of the Nativity, Port St. Lucie, Florida
- Denomination: Anglican
- Spouse: Ann Said
- Children: 4

John Lewis Said (1932 – January 5, 2019) served as Bishop Suffragan in the Episcopal Diocese of Southeast Florida (1995–2003) and Assistant Bishop in the Episcopal Diocese of Central Florida (2003–2018).

Said was born in Marion, Indiana, in 1932. He studied at Wabash College and Yale Divinity School. He was ordained deacon in 1958 and priest in 1959. He then served parishes in Indiana and Florida. He also served as a missionary in Brazil from 1966 to 1969. In 1984 he became rector of St Kevin's Church in Opa-locka, Florida. In 1987, he joined the Brotherhood of St. Andrew.

On October 29, 1994, he was elected Suffragan Bishop of Southeast Florida and was consecrated to the episcopate on February 25, 1995, with Presiding Bishop Edmond L. Browning as chief consecrator. He served in that post until 2003 when he became Assistant Bishop of Central Florida. He also served as bishop in residence at the Church of the Nativity in Port St. Lucie, Florida. He died in Port St. Lucie, Florida, after a lengthy illness.
