= Paul Reeves (bishop of Georgia) =

The Right Reverend George Paul Reeves D.D.
- Bishop of Georgia
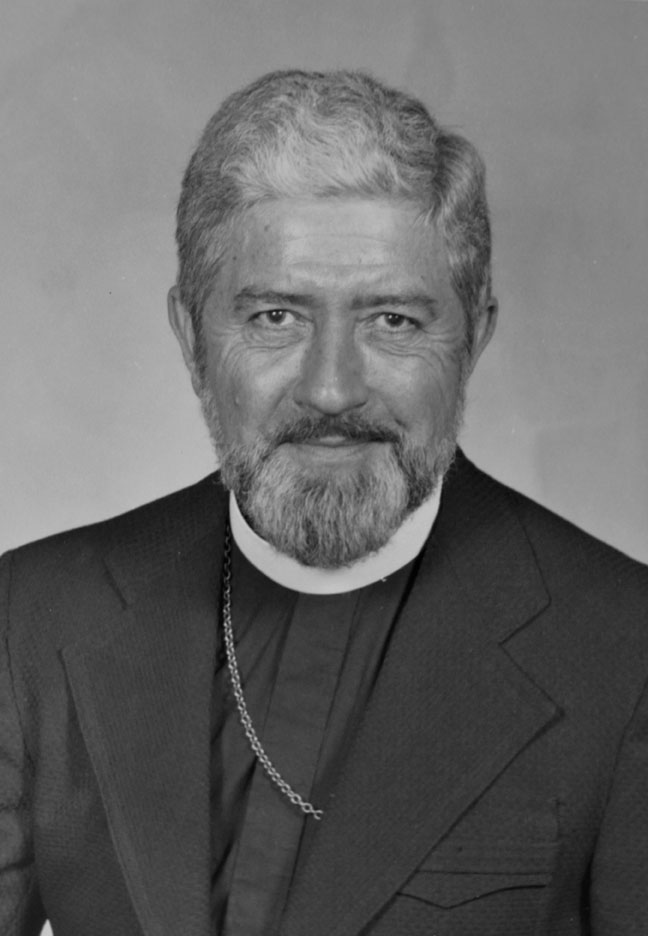
- Church: Episcopal Church
- Diocese: Georgia
- In office: 1972–1985
- Predecessor: Albert R. Stuart
- Successor: Harry W. Shipps
- Previous post: Coadjutor Bishop of Georgia (1969-1972)

Orders
- Ordination: November 1, 1948 by Frank Juhan
- Consecration: September 30, 1969 by Albert R. Stuart

Personal details
- Born: October 14, 1918 Roanoke, Virginia, United States
- Died: April 15, 2010 (aged 91) Asheville, North Carolina, United States
- Denomination: Anglican (prev. Congregational)
- Parents: George Floyd Reeves & Hattie Faye Foster
- Spouse: Adele Ethel Beer (m. Dec. 18, 1943)
- Children: 2
- Education: Randolph–Macon College

George Paul Reeves (October 14, 1918 – April 15, 2010) was an American bishop. He was the Seventh Bishop of Georgia in the Episcopal Church in the United States of America (ECUSA).

== Life ==
Paul Reeves was born October 14, 1918, in Roanoke, Virginia. He was a 1940 Phi Beta Kappa graduate of Randolph-Macon College and received a Bachelor in Divinity degree from Yale Divinity School in 1943. On December 18, 1943, he married Adele Ethel Beer. He was ordained as a deacon on May 6, 1948, and to the priesthood on All Saints Day (November 1) of the same year. He served as Navy chaplain aboard the USS Piedmont during World War II. After three years serving as a chaplain at Ruge Hall at Florida State University in Tallahassee, Florida, Reeves became the rector of All Saints' Church in Winter Park, Florida. He also served as the rector of the Church of the Redeemer in Sarasota, Florida, from 1959 to 1965. He served 15 years—the last eight as president—on the standing committee of the Diocese of Central Florida and was a deputy to three general conventions. In parish ministry, he last served as the rector of St. Stephen's Church in Miami, from which post he was elected bishop coadjutor of Georgia in 1969.

He died April 15, 2010, in Asheville, North Carolina. A Requiem Eucharist was held at St. Johns Episcopal Church, Savannah.

== Episcopacy ==
Reeves was consecrated as the seventh bishop of the Episcopal Diocese of Georgia at Christ Church, Savannah, on September 30, 1969. He had been elected as a bishop coadjutor to succeed Albert R. Stuart on Bishop Stuart's retirement. He stood in opposition to the 1979 revisions to the Book of Common Prayer and the ordination of women in The Episcopal Church. Reeves served as diocesan bishop from 1972 to 1985. He was succeeded by Harry W. Shipps, who in recalling his predecessor in a Savannah Morning News article at the time of Reeves' death remembered both his strong views and his sense of humor, "I greatly valued his wisdom, and recall his strong commitment to the historic traditions of the Church. He had an ironic sense of humor that always amused."

== Sources ==
- History of Church of the Redeemer, Sarasota, Florida
- Louie Crew's page on Reeves
- Episcopal Church Service article on Reeves' retirement
- Savannah Morning News article on Reeves' death
- Episcopal News Service article on Reeves' death
