= William H. Folwell =

American Episcopal bishop (1924–2022)

The Right Reverend William H. Folwell
- Bishop of Central Florida
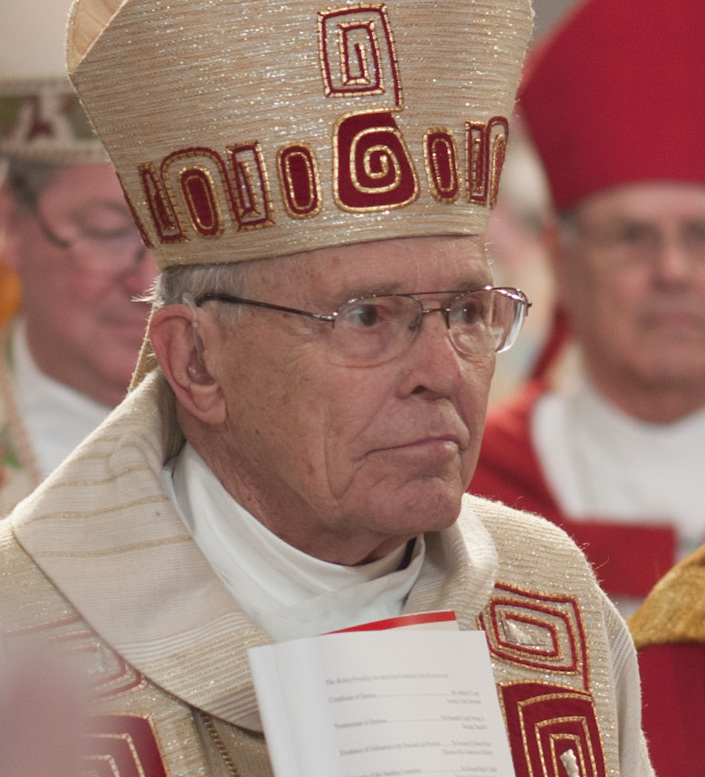
- Folwell in 2012
- Church: Episcopal Church
- Diocese: Central Florida
- Elected: 1969
- In office: 1970–1989
- Predecessor: Henry I. Louttit Sr.
- Successor: John W. Howe

Orders
- Ordination: 1953 by Henry I. Louttit Sr.
- Consecration: February 11, 1970 by Henry I. Louttit Sr.

Personal details
- Born: William Hopkins Folwell; October 26, 1924 Port Washington, New York, U.S.
- Died: February 7, 2022 (aged 97) Hendersonville, North Carolina, U.S.
- Denomination: Anglican
- Parents: Ralph Taylor Folwell, Sara Ewing Hopkins
- Spouse: Christine Elizabeth Cramp (1929-2017)
- Children: 3

William Hopkins Folwell (October 26, 1924 – February 7, 2022) was an American Episcopal prelate who served as the Bishop of Central Florida from 1970 until 1989.

== Early life and education ==
Folwell was born on October 26, 1924, in Port Washington, New York, the son of Ralph Taylor Folwell and Sara Ewing Hopkins. He studied at the Georgia Institute of Technology and graduated with a Bachelor of Civil Engineering degree in 1947. During WWII, Folwell served as a Civil Engineer Corps Officer. He worked as an assistant traffic engineer for the City of Miami between 1947 and 1949. He married Christine Elizabeth Cramp on April 22, 1949, and had three children with her. He enrolled at Seabury-Western Theological Seminary from where he earned a Bachelor of Divinity degree in 1953. He was awarded an honorary Doctor of Divinity degree from Seabury Western Theological Seminary and one from the University of the South.

== Ordained ministry ==
Folwell was made deacon on June 2, 1952, by Bishop Henry I. Louttit Sr. of South Florida at St. Philip's Church, Coral Gables, Florida. He was then ordained priest in 1953. He served as vicar of St. Peter's Church in Plant City, Florida, from 1952 to 1955, and also as priest-in-charge of St. Luke's Church in Mulberry, Florida, from 1954 to 1955. He then became assistant chaplain at St. Martin's Episcopal School in New Orleans, and subsequently served as vicar of St. Augustine's Church in New Orleans from 1955 to 1956. In 1956 he became rector of St. Gabriel's Church in Titusville, Florida, while in 1959 he became rector of All Saints' Church in Winter Park, Florida.

== Bishop ==
In 1970, Folwell was elected Bishop of Central Florida and was consecrated on February 11, 1970, at St. Luke's Cathedral in Orlando with Bishop Henry I. Louttit Sr. as primary consecrator. He retained the post until his retirement on December 31, 1989.

== Personal life and death ==
Folwell died on February 7, 2022, at the age of 97, at Carolina Village, in Hendersonville, North Carolina and is survived by three children, six grandchildren and two great-grandsons.
