= St. Luke's Episcopal Church and Cemetery (Courtenay, Florida) =

Historic church in Florida, United States

- Old St. Luke's Episcopal Church and Cemetery
- U.S. National Register of Historic Places
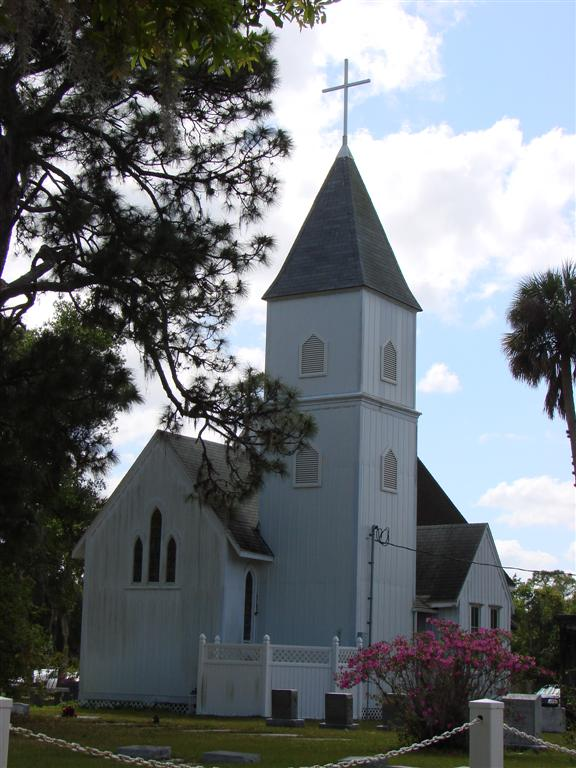

- Location within Florida Location within the United States
- Location: 5555 N. Tropical Trail, Courtenay; Merritt Island, Florida
- Coordinates: 28°27′26″N 80°43′3″W
- Built: 1888
- NRHP reference No.: 90000848
- Added to NRHP: June 15, 1990

St. Luke's Episcopal Church and Cemetery is an historic Carpenter Gothic style Episcopal church building built in 1888 and its adjacent cemetery located at 5555 North Tropical Trail, in Courtenay, on Merritt Island, Florida, in the United States. On June 15, 1990, St. Luke's and its cemetery were added to the National Register of Historic Places as Old St. Luke's Episcopal Church and Cemetery.

== Current use ==
St. Luke's is an active parish in the Episcopal Diocese of Central Florida. In 1978 a new church building was completed adjacent to the old church, built in 1888, which is now used as a chapel for small weddings and funerals.
