= Gregory Brewer =

American bishop

The Right Reverend Gregory Brewer
- Bishop of Central Florida
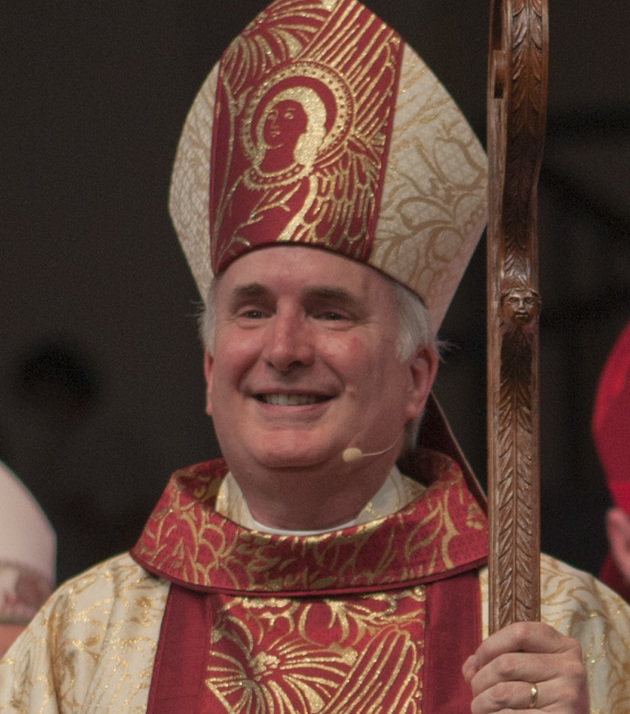
- Brewer in 2012
- Church: Episcopal Church
- Diocese: Central Florida
- Elected: November 19, 2011
- In office: 2012–2023
- Predecessor: John W. Howe
- Successor: Justin S. Holcomb

Orders
- Ordination: June 5, 1976 (deacon); January 6, 1977 (priest)
- Consecration: March 24, 2012 by Clifton Daniel

Personal details
- Born: July 6, 1951 (age 74) Richmond, Virginia, United States
- Denomination: Anglican
- Spouse: Laura Lee Williams
- Children: 5

Gregory Orrin Brewer (born July 6, 1951) was the fourth bishop of the Episcopal Diocese of Central Florida.

== Biography ==
Brewer was born in Richmond, Virginia. After studies at Virginia Theological Seminary he was ordained to the diaconate on June 5, 1976, and to the priesthood on January 6, 1977. He was consecrated as a bishop on March 24, 2012. He was involved in musical theater from a young age.

He is a retired member of Communion Partners, a group which opposed the 77th General Convention's decision to authorize the blessing of same-sex marriages in 2012. The measure to allow the blessing of same-sex unions won by a 111–41 vote with 3 abstentions.

== See also ==
- List of Episcopal bishops of the United States
- Historical list of the Episcopal bishops of the United States
