= Justin S. Holcomb =

American bishop and author

The Right Reverend Dr. Justin S. Holcomb
- Bishop of Central Florida
- Church: Episcopal Church
- Diocese: Central Florida
- Elected: January 14, 2023
- In office: 2023–present
- Predecessor: Gregory Brewer

Orders
- Ordination: 2006
- Consecration: June 10, 2023 by W. Michie Klusmeyer

Personal details
- Born: 1973 (age 52–53)
- Denomination: Anglican
- Spouse: Lindsey A. Holcomb
- Children: 2

Justin S. Holcomb is the fifth and current bishop of the Episcopal Diocese of Central Florida, an author, and a professor.

== Early life and education ==
Holcomb was born in 1973 in Sarasota. He graduated from Pine View School in 1991. Holcomb graduated from Southeastern University (Florida) in 1994 with a Bachelor of Arts degree in Biblical Studies. In 1997, he earned a Master of Arts degree in Theological Studies and a Master of Arts degree in Christian Thought from Reformed Theological Seminary. In the summer of 1996, Holcomb also studied at the Centre for Medieval and Renaissance Studies in Oxford, England. He earned his Doctor of Philosophy degree in Theological Studies from Emory University in 2003.

== Career ==
Holcomb teaches theology and apologetics at Reformed Theological Seminary and Gordon-Conwell Theological Seminary. He previously taught at the University of Virginia, Emory University, and Agnes Scott College.

From 2005 to 2008, Holcomb served as the Director of Graduate Ministries at the Center for Christian Study, was founded in Charlottesville, Virginia.

He was ordained deacon and priest in 2006 in the Province of the Episcopal Church of South Sudan, formerly known as Episcopal Church of Sudan. In 2008, he was transferred as a priest from the Province of the Episcopal Church of South Sudan to the Episcopal Church by Bishop Peter Lee, bishop of the Episcopal Diocese of Virginia. From 2013 to 2023, he served as the canon for vocations in the Episcopal Diocese of Central Florida.

Holcomb was elected as bishop of the Episcopal Diocese of Central Florida on January 14, 2023 and was consecrated on June 10, 2023.

Holcomb has served as a board member for GRACE (organization) since 2011.

== Books ==
Holcomb has written or edited twenty-two books on abuse, theology, and biblical studies, including:

=== Books ===
- Rid of My Disgrace: Hope and Healing for Victims of Sexual Assault (co-authored with Lindsey A. Holcomb) (2011)
- On the Grace of God (2013)
- Is It My Fault?: Hope and Healing for Those Suffering Domestic Violence (co-authored with Lindsey A. Holcomb) (2014)
- Know the Creeds and Councils (2014)
- Know the Heretics (2014)
- Acts: A 12-Week Study (2014)
- Ecclesiastes: A 12-Week Study (2014)
- Rid of My Disgrace: Small Group Discussion Guide (2015)
- What Do You Do For a Living? (2015)
- Caring For Survivors of Sexual Abuse (co-authored with Basyle Tchividjian) (2021)
- Children and Trauma: Equipping Parents and Caregivers (co-authored with Lindsey A. Holcomb) (2021)
- God With Us: 365 Devotions on the Person and Work of Christ (2021)

=== Children's Books ===
- God Made All of Me: A Book to Help Children Protect Their Bodies (co-authored with Lindsey A. Holcomb and illustrated by Trish Mahoney) (2015)
- God Made Me in His Image: Helping Children Appreciate Their Bodies (co-authored with Lindsey A. Holcomb and illustrated by Trish Mahoney) (2021)
- God Made Babies: Helping Parents Answer the Baby Question (co-authored with Lindsey A. Holcomb and illustrated by Trish Mahoney) (2022)

=== Edited volumes ===
- Christian Theologies of Scripture: A Comparative Introduction (New York University Press, 2006)
- Christian Theologies of Salvation: A Comparative Introduction (New York University Press, 2017)
- Christian Theologies of Sacraments: A Comparative Introduction ) co-edited with David A. Johnson) (New York University Press, 2017)
- For the World: Essays in Honor of Richard L. Pratt Jr. (edited with Glenn Lucke) (P&R Publishing, 2014)

=== Series editor ===
Holcomb is the series editor for the KNOW series with Zondervan:

- Know the Creeds and Councils (written by Justin S. Holcomb) (2014)
- Know the Heretics (written by Justin S. Holcomb) (2014)
- Know Why You Believe (written by K. Scott Oliphint) (2017)
- Know How We Got Our Bibles (written by Charles Hill and Ryan Reeves) (2018)
- Know the Theologians (written by Jennifer Powell McNutt and David McNutt) (2024)

== See also ==
- List of Episcopal bishops of the United States
- List of bishops of the Episcopal Church in the United States of America
