= Paul Haines =

Paul Haines may refer to:

- Paul Haines (fiction writer) (1970–2012), New Zealand-born horror and speculative fiction writer
- Paul Haines (poet) (1933–2003), Canadian-American avant-garde and jazz poet

== See also ==
- Paul Haynes (disambiguation)
