= John W. Howe (bishop) =

American Anglican bishop (born 1942)

The Right Reverend John Wadsworth Howe D.D.
- Bishop of Central Florida
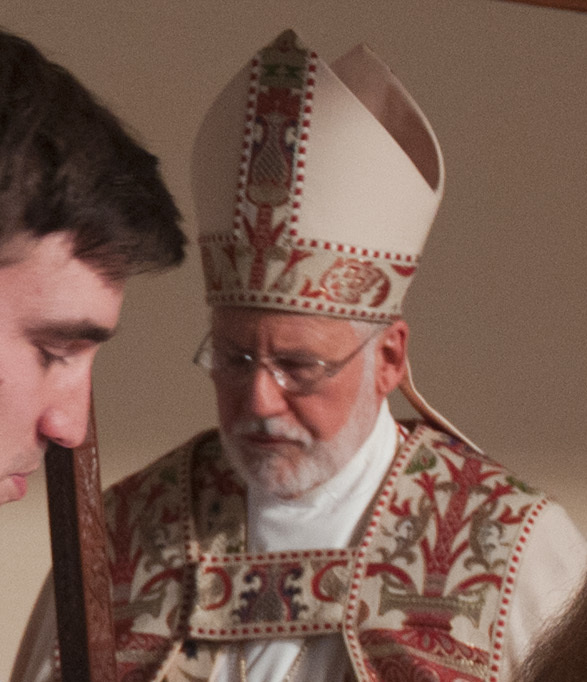
- Bishop Howe in 2012
- Church: Episcopal Church
- Diocese: Central Florida
- In office: 1990–2012
- Predecessor: William H. Folwell
- Successor: Gregory Brewer
- Previous post: Coadjutor Bishop of Central Florida (1989-1990)

Orders
- Ordination: 1968
- Consecration: April 15, 1989 by Edmond L. Browning

Personal details
- Born: November 4, 1942 (age 83) Chicago, Illinois, United States
- Denomination: Anglican
- Parents: John Wadsworth Howe & Shirley Anita Hansen
- Spouse: Karen Louise Elvgren
- Children: 3

John Wadsworth Howe (born November 4, 1942) is an American Anglican bishop. He is a retired bishop of the Episcopal Diocese of Central Florida, serving from 1990 to 2012. He was consecrated as bishop coadjutor on April 15, 1989. On 16 July 2020, he announced that he was joining the Anglican Church in North America.

== Early life and education ==
Howe was born on November 4, 1942, in Chicago, Illinois, the son of John Wadsworth Howe and Shirley Anita Hanson. He studied at the University of Connecticut and graduated with a Bachelor of Arts in 1964. On September 1, 1962, he married Karen Louise Elvgren, and together they had three children. He also graduated with a Master of Divinity from Yale University in 1967. he was awarded a Doctor of Divinity from Berkeley Divinity School in 1989, from Sewanee: The University of the South in 1990 and from Nashotah House in 1991. In 2011 he earned his PhD. from the Graduate Theological Foundation.

== Ordained ministry ==
Howe was ordained deacon in 1967 and priest in 1968. He served as chaplain at Loomis Chaffee School in Windsor, Connecticut, from 1967 to 1969 and then as chaplain at Miss Porter's School in Farmington, Connecticut, from 1969 till 1972. After that, he became associate rector of St Stephen's Church in Sewickley, Pennsylvania, while in 1976 he transferred to Fairfax, Virginia, to serve as rector of Truro Church, where he remained till 1989.

== Bishop ==
Howe was elected Coadjutor Bishop of Central Florida in 1989 and was consecrated on April 15, 1989, at the Calvary Assembly worship center in Winter Park, Florida, by Presiding Bishop Edmond L. Browning. He succeeded as diocesan bishop on January 1, 1990. His episcopacy reflected his conservative and evangelical views. He was one of the bishops who opposed the ordination of Gene Robinson as a bishop. He retired in 2012.

On 16 July 2020, Howe announced that he was leaving the Episcopal Church to join the Anglican Church in North America, with his wife, a female deacon. He explained that one of the main reasons for him to change denominations had been the redefinition of the traditional understanding of marriage and the way in which Bishop William Love, of Albany, was being treated for opposing same-sex marriage in his diocese. He stated that he will continue serving as Senior Pastor of the multi-denominational Lake of the Woods Church, in Locust Grove, Virginia, where he was serving for the previous five years. He will become a retired bishop of the Anglican Church in North America in the Diocese of the Mid-Atlantic.

Anglican Communion titles
Preceded by William H. Folwell	III Bishop of Central Florida; 1990–2012	Succeeded by Gregory Brewer
