= Episcopal Diocese of Southwest Florida =

Episcopal Church diocese in the US

Coordinates: 27.5351°N 82.4819°W

Diocese of Southwest Florida

Location
- Country: United States
- Ecclesiastical province: Province IV

Statistics
- Congregations: 77 (2024)
- Members: 24,046 (2023)

Information
- Denomination: Episcopal Church
- Established: October 16, 1969
- Cathedral: Cathedral of St Peter

Current leadership
- Bishop: Douglas F. Scharf; J. Michael Garrison (Assisting Bishop); Barry Robert Howe (Assisting Bishop)

Map
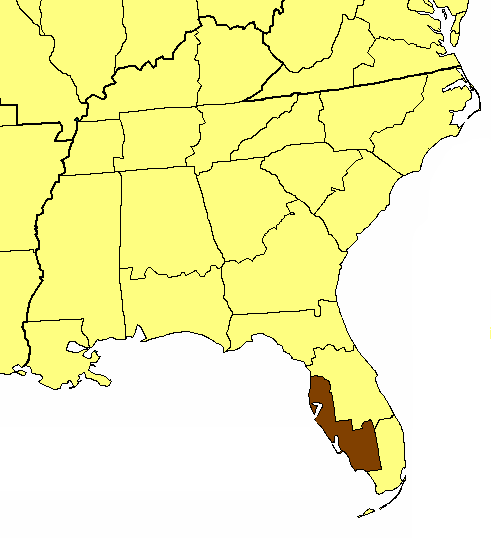
- Location of the Diocese of Southwest Florida

Website
- episcopalswfl.org

The Episcopal Diocese of Southwest Florida is a diocese of the Episcopal Church in the United States of America (ECUSA) in Florida which extends from Marco Island on the south, to Brooksville on the north, and inland to Plant City, Arcadia and LaBelle on the east. As part of the ECUSA, the diocese is a constituent member of the worldwide Anglican Communion.

In 2024, the diocese reported average Sunday attendance (ASA) of 7,300 persons. The most recent membership statistics (2023) showed 24,046 persons in 77 churches. No membership statistics were reported in 2024 national parochial reports.

Major cities in the diocese are Tampa, St. Petersburg, Clearwater, Fort Myers, Sarasota, and Bradenton. The diocese includes the western half of Hendry County, the mainland portion of Monroe County, and all of the counties of Hernando, Pasco, Pinellas, Hillsborough, Manatee, Sarasota, DeSoto, Charlotte, Lee, and Collier.

The diocese is a part of Province IV of the Episcopal Church, historically known as the Province of Sewanee. The current Diocesan Bishop of Southwest Florida is Douglas Scharf. The cathedral church of the diocese is Cathedral Church of St. Peter in St. Petersburg. The diocesan offices are in Parrish, Florida on the campus of the DaySpring Episcopal Center. The diocese currently comprises 78 churches.

== History ==
The Diocese of Southwest Florida was created in 1969 when the Diocese of South Florida was split to form the dioceses of Central Florida, Southeast Florida and Southwest Florida.

Historic church buildings in the Diocese include Ft. Myers Beach's St. Raphael's, St. James House of Prayer, and St. Andrew's, Tampa, Cathedral Church of St. Peter, St. Petersburg, Sarasota's Church of the Redeemer and DaySpring Episcopal Center's St. Thomas Chapel, formerly the Church of the Holy Spirit, Safety Harbor.

== Bishops of the diocese ==
The Bishops of the Diocese of Southwest Florida are:

1. 1969–1975: William L. Hargrave
2. 1975–1988: Emerson Paul Haynes
3. 1989–1997: Rogers Sanders Harris
4. 1997–2007: John Bailey Lipscomb
5. 2007–2022: Dabney Tyler Smith
6. 2022–present: Douglas Frederick Scharf

NOTE: For earlier bishops, see the Episcopal Diocese of South Florida

== Deaneries ==
The diocese is divided into seven deaneries:

- Clearwater Deanery: Clearwater, Dunedin, Hudson, Indian Rocks Beach, Largo, New Port Richey, Palm Harbor, Safety Harbor, Seminole, Spring Hill and Tarpon Springs. The Rev. Randy Hehr, Dean.
- Fort Myers Deanery: Cape Coral, Fort Myers, Fort Myers Beach, LaBelle, Lehigh Acres, North Fort Myers, Pine Island and Sanibel. The Rev. Dr. Ellen Sloan, Dean.
- Manasota Deanery: Anna Maria, Arcadia, Bradenton, Longboat Key, Osprey, Palmetto and Sarasota: The Very Rev. Fredrick A. Robinson, Dean.
- Naples Deanery: Bonita Springs, Marco Island and Naples. The Rev Edward Gleason, Dean.
- St. Petersburg Deanery: Pinellas Park, St. Petersburg and St. Pete Beach: The Rev. Stephen B. Morris, Dean.
- Tampa Deanery: Brooksville, Dade City, Plant City, Ruskin, Tampa, Temple Terrace, Valrico and Zephyrhills. The Rev. Charles Connelly, Dean.
- Venice Deanery: Boca Grande, Englewood, North Port, Osprey, Port Charlotte, Punta Gorda and Venice. The Rev. Michelle Robertshaw, Dean.

== See also ==
- Episcopal Church in the United States of America
- St. Andrews Episcopal Church
- St. James House of Prayer Episcopal Church
- Christianity
- Anglican Communion

== Bibliography ==
- Cushman, Joseph D., Jr., A Goodly Heritage: The Episcopal Church in Florida, 1821-1892, Gainesville: University of Florida Press (1965)
