= William E. Gray =

American politician

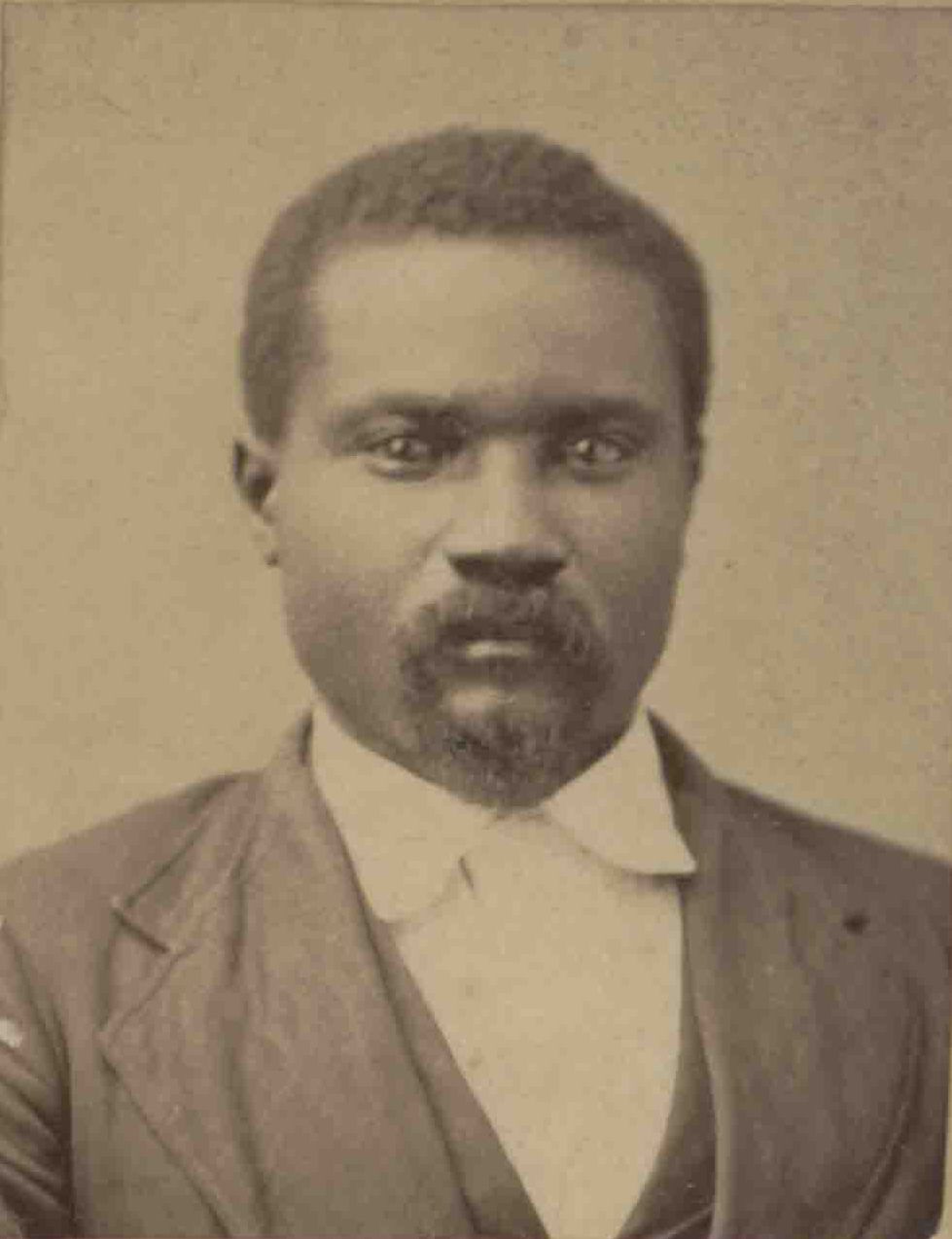
William "Willis" E. Gray

William "Willis" E. Gray (born c. 1848) was a state legislator in Arkansas who served in the Arkansas House of Representatives representing Pulaski County in 1881. A Republican, he was elected from Pulaski County along with B. D. Williams,

In 1883 he was named as an alternative delegate to the National Convention.

In 1888 Gray was appointed as an election judge for Young Township. In 1890 he was selected to represent Young Township at the State Convention.

== See also ==
- African American officeholders from the end of the Civil War until before 1900
