= St. Andrew's Episcopal Church (Tampa, Florida) =

Historic church in Florida, United States

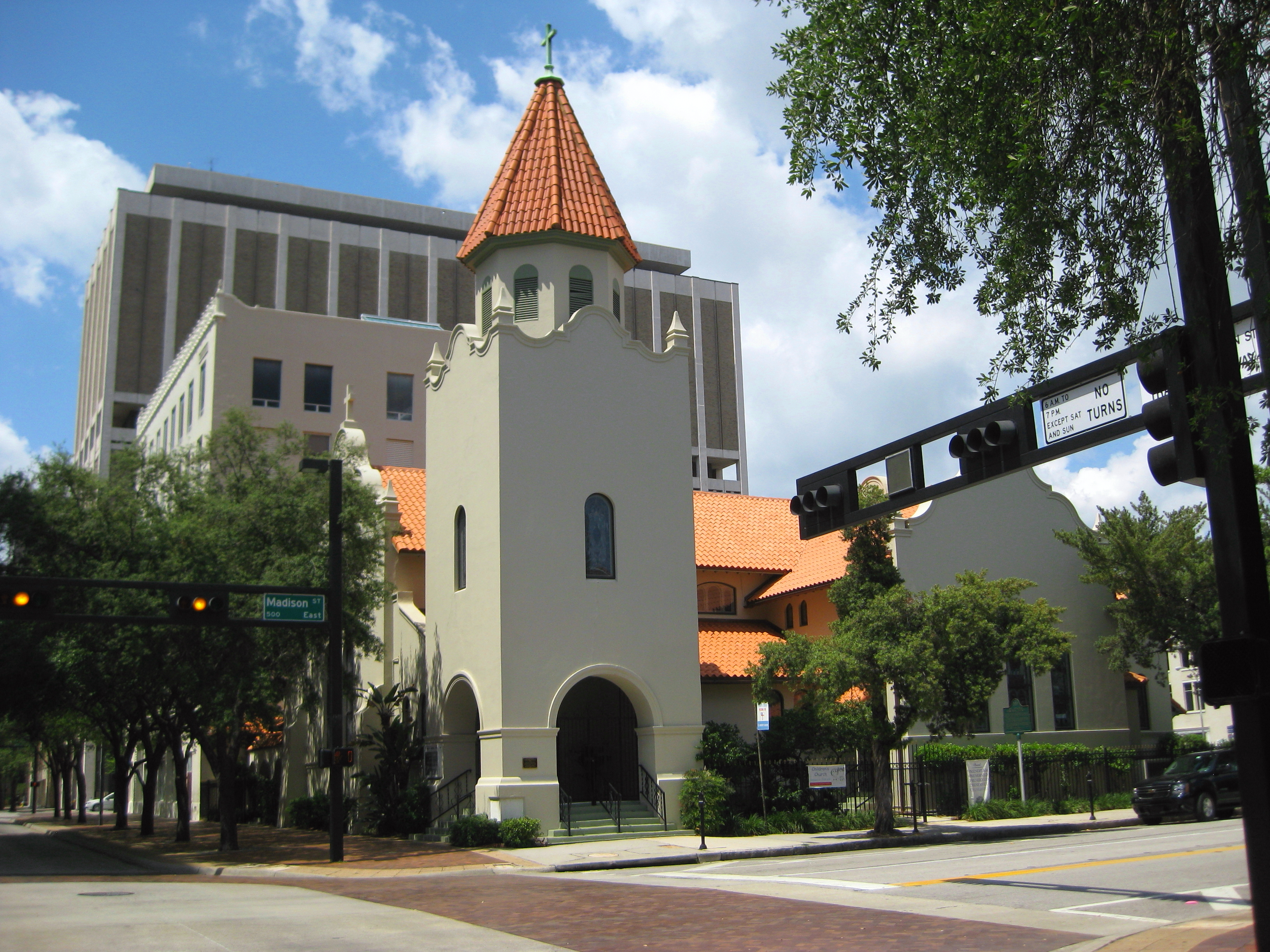

Religion
- Affiliation: Episcopal Church
- Province: Province IV (Sewanee)
- Leadership: The Rev. John Reese, Rector
- Status: Active parish

Location
- Location: 505 North Marion Street; Tampa, Florida
- Interactive map of St. Andrew's Episcopal Church
- Territory: Diocese of Southwest Florida

Architecture
- Architects: Miller, Michael J. Kennard, Francis J.
- Type: Church
- Style: Mediterranean Revival
- Groundbreaking: 1904
- Completed: 1907
- St. Andrew's Episcopal Church
- U.S. National Register of Historic Places
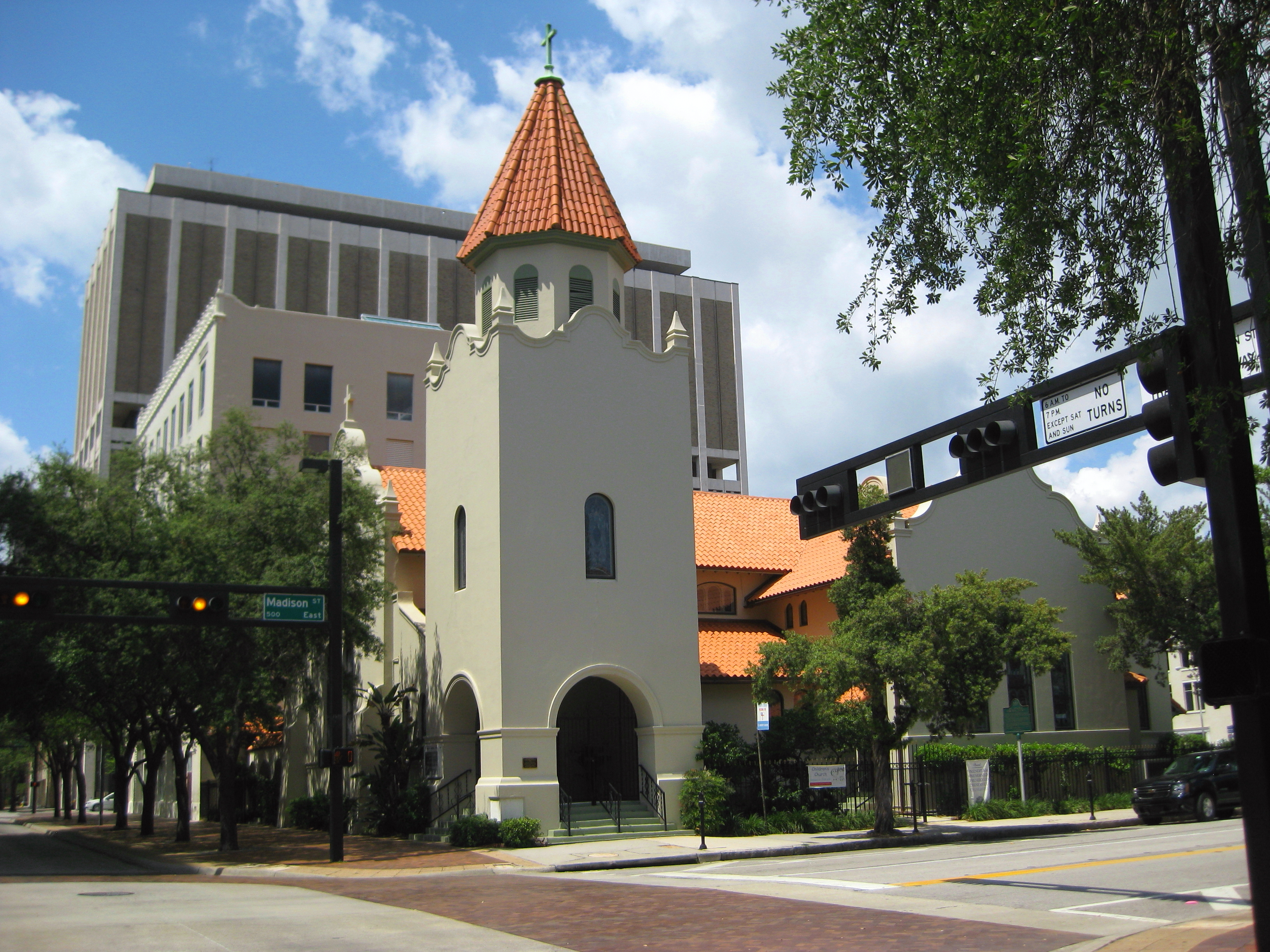

- Location within Florida Location within the United States
- Coordinates: 27°56′58″N 82°27′24″W
- NRHP reference No.: 09000200
- Added to NRHP: April 15, 2009

Website
- www.saintandrewstampa.org

St. Andrew's Episcopal Church is an active Episcopal parish and historic church building in Tampa, Florida, United States. The structure is located downtown at 505 North Marion Street (corner of Marion and Madison Streets), however, the parish offices are located at 509 East Twiggs Street. On April 15, 2009, the church building was added to the U.S. National Register of Historic Places (NRHP). Francis J. Kennard and Michael J. Miller are credited as the building's architects.

The congregation was officially established on July 24, 1871, and was the first Episcopal church in the city of Tampa. Initially, a hospital building at Fort Brooke was used for worship services. In 1877, the congregation purchased the block of land bounded by Marion, Twiggs, Morgan, and Madison Streets, where they are presently located. A wood frame church was erected on the site in 1883.

Construction on their current church building began in 1904 and three years later, the structure was completed. The historic Mediterranean Revival style building was designed by the prominent local architectural firm of Michael J. Miller & Francis J. Kennard, who had designed the Belleview-Biltmore Hotel and other significant structures which today are also NRHP-listed. Their design for St. Andrew's incorporated several components from the original wooden church, including the stained glass windows, communion rail, and lectern.

As Tampa's population grew and the city expanded, St. Andrew's parish helped to establish the local Episcopal congregations of St. John's and St. Mary's. The church is under the Tampa Deanery of the Episcopal Diocese of Southwest Florida, which is within Province 4 of the Episcopal Church in the United States of America.

Next door to the historic church, on the same block at the corner of Twiggs and Marion Streets, is the six-story Western Union Building. The Art Deco styled, commercial office building built in 1929 was purchased by St. Andrew's Episcopal Church in 1996.

== See also ==
- Episcopal Diocese of Southwest Florida
