= Bill Gray (Canadian football) =

American gridiron football player

Profile
- Position: Running back

Personal information
- Born: Norfolk, Virginia, USA

Career information
- College: Maryland State College

Career history
- 1961–1965: Saskatchewan Roughriders

Bill Gray was a running back for the Saskatchewan Roughriders of the Canadian Football League from 1961 to 1965.

Bill Gray played college football as a running back at Maryland State College, now called University of Maryland Eastern Shore, rushing for 4.6 yards per carry. Gray joined the Saskatchewan Roughriders as a rookie in 1961 and rushed for 312 yards (5.8 yards per carry) and 25.9 yards per kick return. He earned his chance to start on offense in 1962 after an injury to Ray Purdin, and quickly profited by it by rushing for 140 yards in a single game against the Montreal Alouettes. Although his yards per carry dipped to 4.5, 1962 was his best year with 673 rushing yards and 30 receptions for 419 yards. However, the following year, Gray was hampered by injuries and replaced by Ed Buchanan, eventually playing behind him in 1964 and 1965 until signing with the Montreal Alouettes. But he was then released on 19 July 1966.
