= William Crane Gray =

American bishop

The Right Reverend William Crane Gray
- Missionary Bishop of Southern Florida
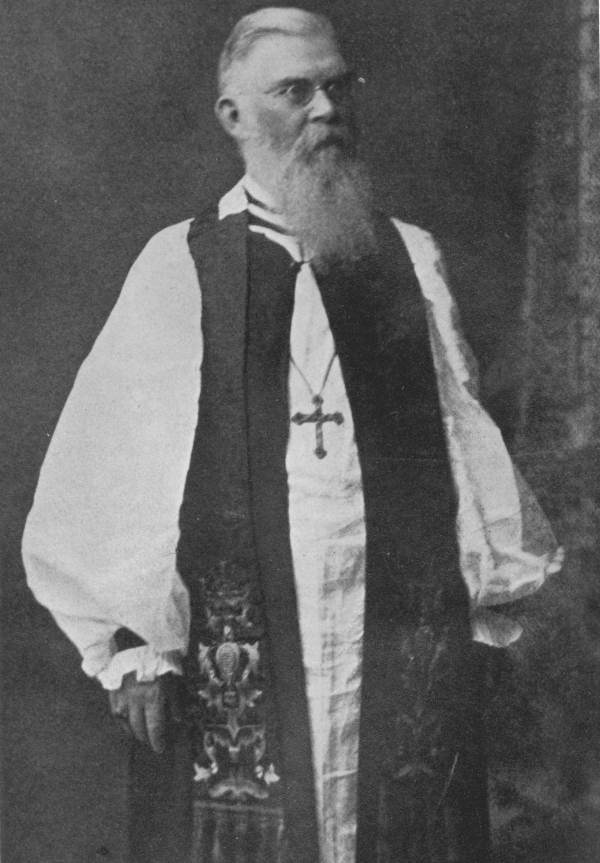
- Church: Episcopal Church
- Diocese: South Florida
- Elected: October 1892
- In office: 1892–1913
- Successor: Cameron D. Mann

Orders
- Ordination: 1860 by James Hervey Otey
- Consecration: December 29, 1892 by Charles Todd Quintard

Personal details
- Born: September 6, 1835 Lambertville, New Jersey, United States
- Died: November 14, 1919 (aged 84) Nashville, Tennessee, United States
- Buried: Mount Olivet Cemetery (Nashville)
- Denomination: Anglican
- Parents: Joseph Gray & Hannah Price Crane
- Spouse: Margaret Locke Trent (m. 1863); Fannie Campbell Bowers (m. 1877)
- Children: 3
- Education: Kenyon College

William Crane Gray (September 6, 1835 – November 14, 1919) was the first bishop of the Episcopal Church's Missionary Jurisdiction of Southern Florida, which had been split off from the Episcopal Diocese of Florida in October 1892.

== Childhood and Education ==
William Crane Gray was born in Lambertville, New Jersey, on September 6, 1835, the son of Joseph Gray and Hannah Price Gray. When he was ten he and his parents moved to Tennessee. In 1859 he graduated from Kenyon College in Gambier, Ohio and he then went to seminary at Bexley Hall, which was then located in Gambier.

== Ministry ==
William Crane Gray was ordained to the diaconate on June 26, 1859, in Christ Church, Nashville, Tennessee, and to the priesthood in 1860, in St Peter's Church, Columbia, Tennessee. He served as chaplain of a Tennessee regiment during the Civil War.

After the war, Gray served parishes in Bolivar and Nashville. After two decades as rector of the Church of the Advent in Nashville, he was elected bishop of the new Missionary Jurisdiction of Southern Florida. His consecration was held there.

In south Florida, Bishop Gray found five self-supporting parishes, 40 organized missions and 11 mission stations. Among other churches established during his episcopate was a mission to the Seminoles in Immokalee (in 1898). In 1913, Bishop Edwin Garner Weed of Florida realized that the missionary Southern diocese had grown much more rapidly than the original diocese, due to the expansion of railroad service to Tampa and Key West, and suggested returning Marion and Volusia Counties to the original diocese, but that suggestion failed when only one of the thirteen parishes in the missionary district agreed.

Gray served for 21 years in Florida before submitting his resignation on grounds of ill health in October 1913.

== Family ==
William Crane Gray's first wife was Margaret Locke Trent, whom he married on May 20, 1863. His second wife was Fannie Campbell Bowers, whom he married August 2, 1877. Their son, Campbell Gray born January 6, 1879, later became Bishop of the Episcopal Diocese of Northern Indiana.

== Later life ==
William Crane Gray retired as Missionary Bishop of Southern Florida in 1913 and went to live with his son in Nashville, where he died on November 14, 1919. He was buried on November 16, 1919, in Mount Olivet Cemetery (Nashville)

== Note on the Missionary Jurisdiction of Southern Florida ==
The Missionary Jurisdiction of Southern Florida in 1922 became the Diocese of South Florida. The diocese named its residence for retired clergy and others in Davenport, Florida after the first bishop. In 1969, the Diocese of South Florida was split into three dioceses as follows: the Diocese of Central Florida, the Diocese of Southeast Florida and the Diocese of Southwest Florida.

== Legacy and honors ==
The World War II Liberty Ship SS William Crane Gray was named in his honor.

== See also ==
- All Saints Episcopal Church (Jensen Beach, Florida) Tells of the Bishop's missionary efforts.
- Campbell Gray, II Bishop of Northern Indiana, son of William Crane Gray
- Francis Campbell Gray VI Bishop of Northern Indiana and Assistant Bishop of Virginia, grandson of Campbell Gray
- Historical list of bishops of the Episcopal Church in the United States of America

== Sources ==
- Cushman, Joseph D. Jr., A Goodly Heritage: The Episcopal Church in Florida, 1821-1892, Gainesville: University of Florida Press (1965) pp. 199–200.
