= Henry I. Louttit Sr. =

Bishop of South Florida and later Central Florida

The Right Reverend Henry I. Louttit Sr.
- Bishop of Central Florida
- Church: Episcopal Church
- Diocese: Central Florida
- In office: 1969–1970
- Successor: William H. Folwell
- Previous posts: Suffragan Bishop of South Florida (1945-1948); Coadjutor Bishop of South Florida (1948-1951); Bishop of South Florida (1951-1969)

Orders
- Ordination: June 23, 1929 by John Durham Wing
- Consecration: May 23, 1945 by John Durham Wing

Personal details
- Born: January 1, 1903 Buffalo, New York, United States
- Died: July 24, 1984 (aged 81) Orlando, Florida, United States
- Denomination: Anglican
- Parents: William Henry Louttit, Susan Bruman
- Spouse: Amy Moss Cleckler
- Children: 2
- Education: Hobart College

Henry Irving Louttit Sr. (January 1, 1903 – July 24, 1984) was bishop of South Florida and Central Florida in The Episcopal Church. His son, Henry I. Louttit, Jr., was also a bishop.

== Early life and education ==
Louttit was born on January 1, 1903, in Buffalo, New York, the son of William Henry Louttit and Susan Bruman. He studied at Hobart College in Geneva, New York, where he graduated with a Bachelor of Arts degree in 1925. He then entered Virginia Theological Seminary and graduated with a Bachelor of Divinity in 1929. He married Amy Cleckler on June 22, 1936, and together they had two sons. He was awarded honorary Doctor of Divinity degrees from both the Virginia Seminary and Hobart.

== Ordained ministry ==
Louttit was ordained deacon on July 15, 1928, and priest on June 23, 1929. He became rector of All Saints' Church in Tarpon Springs, Florida. He then moved to his home parish, Trinity Church in Miami to serve as a curate. From 1930 to 1933, he was rector of Holy Cross Church in Sanford, Florida. In 1933 he became the rector of Holy Trinity Church in West Palm Beach, Florida. During World War II, he enrolled as a chaplain in the US Army with the 31st Infantry Division in the Dutch East Indies.

== Episcopacy ==
On February 7, 1945, Louttit was elected on the second ballot as Suffragan Bishop of South Florida during a special diocesan meeting that took place in St Luke's Cathedral, Orlando, Florida. He was then consecrated on May 23, 1945, by the Bishop of South Florida John Durham Wing in Holy Trinity Church. On April 14, 1948, he was elected Coadjutor Bishop of South Florida and succeeded as diocesan on January 1, 1951. During his episcopate, the large Diocese of South Florida was divided in three in 1969. With his retirement on December 31, 1969, the Diocese of South Florida ceased to exist and he became the first Bishop of Central Florida. He served in that post till 1970, when a new bishop was elected.

Louttit was also one of twelve bishops who formed a "Committee of Bishops to Defend the Faith" and charged the Bishop of California, James Pike, with several heresies.
