= Courtenay, Florida =

Unincorporated community in Florida, US

Courtenay ( /ˈkɔːrtni/; KORT-nee) is an unincorporated community on Merritt Island in Brevard County, Florida, United States. It is part of the Palm Bay–Melbourne–Titusville Metropolitan Statistical Area. Courtenay was settled in the 1870s and 1880s by people from Charleston, South Carolina, and was named for William Ashmead Courtenay, a native of Charleston, Confederate veteran and Charleston businessman who later served two terms as Mayor of Charleston.

Courtenay Parkway, the northern part of which is State Road 3, is a major north–south road on Merritt Island. Both the place and the road are sometimes misspelled Courteney. Historic old St. Luke's Episcopal Church and Cemetery is located in Courtenay.

== Post office ==
A U.S. post office was established on March 8, 1886, with the name of Courteney, Florida, which was corrected to Courtenay on May 6, 1893. Postmasters for this office included renowned novelist Professor Peck and Edward Porcher. The Courtenay post office closed on March 31, 1930, and the area was transferred to the Cocoa post office.

== Geography ==
Courtenay is located at 28°27′24″N 80°42′35″W.
