= Episcopal Diocese of South Florida =

Diocese of the Episcopal Church from 1922-1969

Coordinates: 25.7901°N 80.1861°W

Diocese of South Florida

Location
- Country: United States
- Ecclesiastical province: Province IV

Statistics
- Congregations: 204 (1969)

Information
- Denomination: Episcopal Church
- Established: 1922
- Cathedral: Cathedral of St Luke

The Episcopal Diocese of South Florida was a diocese of the Episcopal Church in the United States of America, which was created in 1922 out of what had been the Missionary Jurisdiction of Southern Florida, sometimes called the Missionary District of Southern Florida. Which had been split off in 1892 from the Episcopal Diocese of Florida. Its northern line was the southern boundaries of the counties of Levy. Alachua, Putnam and St. Johns. and covered the southern two-thirds of the Florida peninsula. Its see city was Orlando, Florida. In 1969, it was divided into three new dioceses as follows: the Episcopal Diocese of Central Florida with its see at Orlando, the Episcopal Diocese of Southeast Florida with its see at Miami and the Episcopal Diocese of Southwest Florida, with its see at St. Petersburg.

== Missionary Bishops of Southern Florida ==
- 1893-1913 William Crane Gray, Bishop
- 1913-1922 Cameron Mann, Bishop, previously 3rd bishop of North Dakota

== Bishops of South Florida ==
- 1. 1922-1932 Cameron Mann, first bishop of South Florida
  - 1925-1932 John D. Wing, Bishop Coadjutor
- 2. 1932-1950 John D. Wing, 2nd Bishop of South Florida
  - 1945-1948 Henry I. Louttit, Sr., Suffragan Bishop
  - 1948-1951 Henry I. Louttit, Sr., Bishop Coadjutor
- 3. 1951-1969 Henry I. Louttit, Sr., 3rd Bishop of South Florida
  - 1951-1956 Martin J. Bram, Suffragan Bishop
  - 1956-1961 William F. Moses, Suffragan Bishop
  - 1961-1969 William L. Hargrave, Suffragan Bishop, became first Bishop of Southwest Florida
  - 1961-1969 James L. Duncan, Suffragan Bishop, became first Bishop of Southeast Florida

== See also ==
- Episcopal Diocese of Florida
- Episcopal Diocese of Southeast Florida
- Episcopal Diocese of Southwest Florida
- Episcopal Diocese of Central Florida
