= SS William Crane Gray =

Liberty ship of WWII

History

United States
- Name: William Crane Gray
- Namesake: William Crane Gray
- Owner: War Shipping Administration (WSA)
- Operator: International Freighting Corp.
- Ordered: as type (EC2-S-C1) hull, MC hull 2485
- Awarded: 23 April 1943
- Builder: St. Johns River Shipbuilding Company, Jacksonville, Florida
- Cost: $1,097,202
- Yard number: 49
- Way number: 1
- Laid down: 23 May 1944
- Launched: 12 July 1944
- Sponsored by: Mrs. Louie W. Strum
- Completed: 27 July 1944
- Identification: Call sign: WRRI
- Fate: Laid up in the National Defense Reserve Fleet, Wilmington, North Carolina, 29 May 1948; Laid up in the National Defense Reserve Fleet, Beaumont, Texas, 27 May 1952; Sold for scrapping, 1 May 1972, withdrawn from fleet, 21 July 1972

General characteristics
- Class & type: Liberty ship; type EC2-S-C1, standard
- Tonnage: 10,865 LT DWT; 7,176 GRT
- Displacement: 3,380 long tons (3,434 t) (light); 14,245 long tons (14,474 t) (max)
- Length: 441 feet 6 inches (135 m) oa; 416 feet (127 m) pp; 427 feet (130 m) lwl
- Beam: 57 feet (17 m)
- Draft: 27 ft 9.25 in (8.4646 m)
- Installed power: 2 × Oil fired 450 °F (232 °C) boilers, operating at 220 psi (1,500 kPa); 2,500 hp (1,900 kW)
- Propulsion: 1 × triple-expansion steam engine, (manufactured by General Machinery Corp., Hamilton, Ohio); 1 × screw propeller
- Speed: 11.5 knots (21.3 km/h; 13.2 mph)
- Capacity: 562,608 cubic feet (15,931 m^{3}) (grain); 499,573 cubic feet (14,146 m^{3}) (bale)
- Complement: 38–62 USMM; 21–40 USNAG
- Armament: Varied by ship; Bow-mounted 3-inch (76 mm)/50-caliber gun; Stern-mounted 4-inch (102 mm)/50-caliber gun; 2–8 × single 20-millimeter (0.79 in) Oerlikon anti-aircraft (AA) cannons and/or, 2–8 × 37-millimeter (1.46 in) M1 AA guns

SS William Crane Gray was a Liberty ship built in the United States during World War II. She was named after William Crane Gray, the first bishop of the Episcopal Church's Missionary Jurisdiction of Southern Florida.

== Construction ==
William Crane Gray was laid down on 23 May 1944, under a Maritime Commission (MARCOM) contract, MC hull 2485, by the St. Johns River Shipbuilding Company, Jacksonville, Florida; sponsored by Mrs. Louie W. Strum, the niece of the namesake, and was launched on 12 July 1944.

== History ==
She was allocated to the International Freighting Corp., on 27 July 1944. On 29 May 1948, she was laid up in the National Defense Reserve Fleet, Wilmington, North Carolina. On 27 May 1952, she was laid up in the National Defense Reserve Fleet, Beaumont, Texas. She was sold for scrapping, 1 May 1972, to Luria Brothers and Co., for $40,333.33. She was removed from the fleet, 21 July 1972.

== Bibliography ==
- "St. John's River Shipbuilding, Jacksonville FL". www.ShipbuildingHistory.com. 16 October 2010.
- Maritime Administration. "William Crane Gray". Ship History Database Vessel Status Card. U.S. Department of Transportation, Maritime Administration.
- Davies, James (May 2004). "Specifications (As-Built)" (PDF). p. 23.
- "SS William Crane Gray".
