= St. James Episcopal Church (Watkins Glen, New York) =

Historic church in New York, United States

- U.S. National Register of Historic Places
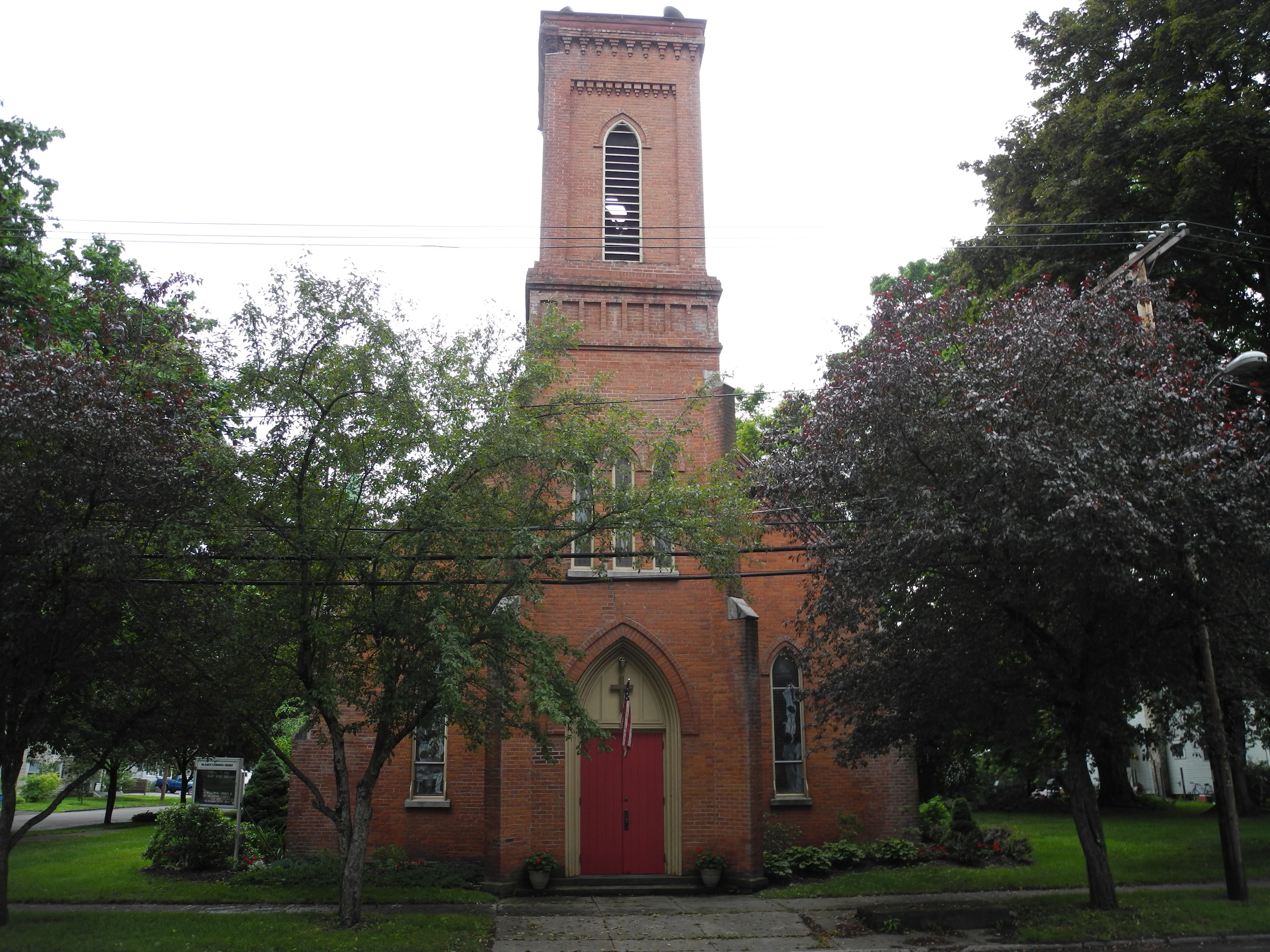
- St. James Episcopal Church, June 2013

- Location within New York Location within the United States
- Location: 112 6th St., Watkins Glen, New York
- Coordinates: 42°22′47″N 76°52′17″W
- Area: Less than 1 acre (0.40 ha)
- Built: 1864, 1878
- Architectural style: Gothic Revival
- NRHP reference No.: 12000960
- Added to NRHP: November 21, 2012

St. James Episcopal Church is a historic Episcopal church located at Watkins Glen in Schuyler County, New York. It was built in 1864, and is a Gothic Revival style brick church. It has a high pitched gable roof, buttresses, and long pointed arched windows. It features a three-stage square entrance tower and belfry added in 1866. The chancel was expanded in 1878.

It was listed on the National Register of Historic Places in 2012.
