= John Lipscomb =

John Bailey Lipscomb (born July 25, 1950) is a former Episcopal bishop who later became a Roman Catholic priest.

Lipscomb's father was a Baptist pastor and Lipscomb grew up in the Baptist tradition. In 1997, Lipscomb succeeded as bishop of the Episcopal Diocese of Southwest Florida where he oversaw around 37,000 Episcopalians. He retired in 2007 after months of medical leave relating to malaria and Parkinson's disease. After his retirement, he joined the Roman Catholic Church and was ordained as a priest in that church in 2009.

As of 2012, Lipscomb was spiritual director of the Bethany retreat center in the Diocese of St. Petersburg.
