= Albert R. Stuart =

American bishop (1905–1973)

The Right Reverend Albert Rhett Stuart D.D.
- Bishop of Georgia
- Church: Episcopal Church
- Diocese: Georgia
- Elected: May 12, 1954
- In office: 1954–1971
- Predecessor: Middleton S. Barnwell
- Successor: Paul Reeves

Orders
- Ordination: December 21, 1931 by Kirkman G. Finlay
- Consecration: October 20, 1954 by Henry Knox Sherrill

Personal details
- Born: January 20, 1906 Washington, D.C., United States
- Died: April 17, 1973 (aged 67) Savannah, Georgia, United States
- Buried: St. Michael's Churchyard
- Denomination: Anglican
- Parents: Garden Clarkson Stuart & Florence Holcombe Beale
- Spouse: Isabella Clemence Alston (m. Sep. 25, 1945)
- Children: 2
- Education: University of Virginia

Albert Rhett Stuart (January 20, 1906 - April 17, 1973), born in Washington, DC, was the Sixth Bishop of Georgia. He was the 532nd bishop of the Episcopal Church in the United States of America (ECUSA).

== Education ==
Stuart was educated at the Episcopal High School in Alexandria, Virginia. He was a graduate of Virginia Theological Seminary.

== Episcopacy ==
Albert Rhett Stuart was consecrated as the sixth bishop of the Episcopal Diocese of Georgia on October 20, 1954, in St. Pauls, Augusta. He had been elected during the diocesan convention of 1954 when seventeen persons were nominated to succeed Bishop Barnwell. Even with the large field of candidates, Stuart was elected on the second ballot. He was then serving as the Dean of Christ Church Cathedral, New Orleans, and had previously served as rector of the Church of the Redeemer in Greenwood, South Carolina and as rector of St. Michael's, Charleston.

Eighteen months after becoming the diocesan bishop, Stuart told the convention meeting May 8–9, 1956 at St. Thomas' Episcopal Church in Thomasville,

People are discovering that a life full of gadgets is no satisfactory substitute for a life lived in the power and presence of God.

He went on to tell that Diocesan Convention that there were six steps needed for the Diocese to "fulfill her responsibility in this generation and improve her evangelistic witness." He named these as:

- A renewal of confidence and conviction that it is the mission of the Church "to proclaim her Lord as the Way, the Truth, and the Life for all Mankind." For this he recommended year-round use of Church Schools.
- The diocese should appreciate the magnitude of her present opportunity. He encouraged direct evangelistic effort saying, "It is high time the Episcopal Church rose from her dignified posture of waiting to be discovered...and went out into the byways and hedges seeking souls for whom her Lord died."
- New congregations should be established in areas where the Church had no work and in newly developing urban communities.
- Accelerated support for the Church's University of the South at Sewanee.
- Consideration of the sanctity of the Christian marriage partnership as a basic factor in the problem of human relationships.
- Finally, he expressed concern over the racial problem, urging Churchmen to be vigilant "lest the fear and prejudice surrounding us infiltrate our thinking and confuse us as to our clear duty." He reminded those gathered of the many years in which white and colored Churchmen had "known their unity in Christ and have labored together in one fold under one shepherd."

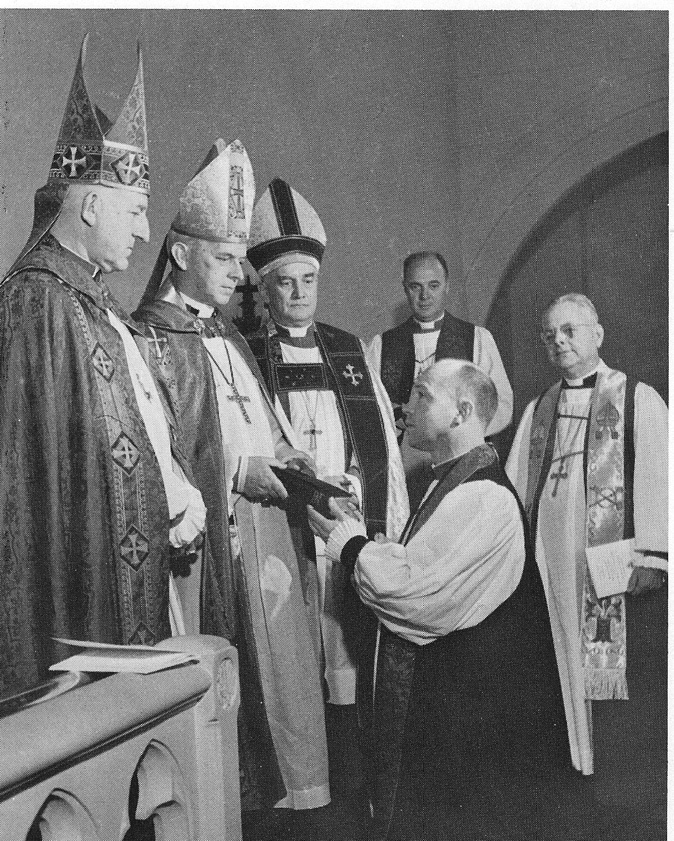
The Rt. Rev. Albert Rhett Stuart at left taking part in the consecration of William Evan Sanders to be Bishop of Tennessee

Henry Louttit, recalls in his booklet, Saints of the Diocese of Georgia how Bishop Stuart was often the only white voice for integration in Savannah willing to speak on TV. In 1965, he confronted St. John's Church over its refusal to integrate. He remembers him speaking up for integration on a visit to Trinity Episcopal Church in Stateboro saying,

This is a free country. You can belong to any kind of church you wish, but the Episcopal Church has never asked anyone why they were coming to the church. We are not starting asking people now. This church is open to anyone who wishes to worship.

He also told a Diocesan Convention that,

The solution of the problem of our society lies not in the realm of law but in the realm of faith and grace.

In 1957, Stuart dedicated a newly acquired Diocesan House on East Bay Street in Savannah as the diocesan headquarters. At that time, there were 9,976 communicants in the Episcopal Diocese of Georgia.

He served as diocesan bishop through 1971. He died two years later and was buried on Holy Saturday of that year, April 21, 1973.

== Awards ==
In 1940, he received an honorary degree in Doctor of Divinity from Oglethorpe University.

== Sources ==
- The Episcopal Church in Georgia 1733–1957, by Henry Thompson Malone published by The Protestant Episcopal Church in the Diocese of Atlanta, 1960
