= Cathedral Church of St. Peter (St. Petersburg, Florida) =

Historic church in Florida, United States

- Location within Florida
- 27°46′23.83″N 82°38′20.18″W
- Location: 140 4th St. N. St. Petersburg, Florida
- Country: United States
- Denomination: Episcopal Church
- Website: www.spcathedral.org

History
- Founded: 1889

Architecture
- Style: Gothic Revival
- Completed: 1899

Administration
- Diocese: Southwest Florida

Clergy
- Bishop: The Right Rev. Douglas F. Scharf
- St. Peter's Episcopal Cathedral
- U.S. Historic district – Contributing property
- Part of: Downtown St. Petersburg Historic District (ID04000364)
- Added to NRHP: 30 April 2004

The Cathedral Church of St. Peter is an Episcopal cathedral in St. Petersburg, Florida, United States. It is the seat of the Diocese of Southwest Florida. In 2004 it was included as a contributing property in the Downtown St. Petersburg Historic District on the National Register of Historic Places.

In 2019, the cathedral reported 1,011 members; in 2023, it reported 959 members. No membership statistics were reported in 2024 national parochial reports. Plate and pledge financial support reported by the church in 2024 was $1,091,178. Average Sunday Attendance (ASA) reported by the cathedral in 2024 was 239 persons. This was a relative decrease from ASA of 451 persons reported in 2020.

== History ==
St. Peter's parish was organized in 1889 and they built a frame structure at 11th Street and Baum Avenue. Peter Tomlinson donated land to the Episcopal Church at what is now the corner of 2nd Avenue North and 4th Street North in 1896 and the frame building was moved there. Three years later Edwin H. Tomlinson donated the adjacent property and $5,000 to erect a new brick church building. The original part of the present church building was constructed at that time.

Over the years additions and alternations were made to the building as the congregation grew. In 1915 a new pipe organ and the room it is housed in were built. At the same time crenellated parapets were added to the east elevation of the side aisles. The tower and spire was raised from three to four stories around 1920. An extension of the church building to the west and an intersecting double-width partial transept to the south was added in 1925. The addition, designed by the Rev. W.W. Williams, doubled the size of the sanctuary and cost about $66,000. In 1951 the sacristy was enlarged, and the south transept was designated St. Mary's Chapel the following year. The frame parish house was taken down in 1940 and a new parish house designed by William Harvard replaced it. Harvard designed an addition to the parish house that was completed in 1959. Copper panels replaced asbestos shingles on the spire in 1972.

St. Peter's Church was designated the diocesan cathedral on November 18, 1969, the same year the diocese was established by the General Convention of the Episcopal Church. The parish acquired the former First Baptist Church facilities in 1990. The Baptist church's education building and St. Peter's parish house were torn down in 2008 to make way for a new multi-purpose building that was completed the following year.

== Architecture ==
The cathedral is masonry building composed of blonde-colored bricks with pink mortar joints. The bricks are set in a Common bond pattern and every sixth course features Flemish headers. The tall tower and spire are located on the north side of the east elevation. There are two shorter towers on the southeast and northwest corners on the west façade that have flat roofs and crenellated parapets. The stained glass windows feature depictions of the life of Christ, the Stations of the Cross, the sacraments, and the lives of the saints. A rose window is located on the west façade. A gothic window depicting Jesus and St. Peter walking on the water is located in the chancel. At one time the altar was located below the window until it was moved into the nave to make way for the present pipe organ, whose pipes now flank the window. The ceiling in the interior features a visible interior scissor truss system with a horizontal tie beam, hammer-beam brace, and clerestory.

== Pipe organ ==
The present pipe organ was originally built by Austin Organs, opus 2427 in 1965 as a 3 manual 61 rank instrument in six divisions. A new four manual console with digital enhancements were added in 1997 by Rodgers Instruments. The main organ is located in the front of the cathedral with the pipework of Great, Pedal and Positive exposed and Swell and Choir division enclosed, and an Antiphonal division (consisting of the original 1915 Austin organ) in the rear of the cathedral. It is equipped with slider and unit chests, with electric key and stop action.

In 2016 a new Antiphonal division was added by the Patrick J. Murphy & Associates Pipe Organ Builders, retaining one rank from the original 1915 Austin pipe organ and moving the original "Trompette en Chamade" located on the cathedral arch to this renovated division, increasing the number of ranks to 64. Also included in the 2016 renovation was a revoicing of the Great and Pedal divisions.

== See also ==
- List of the Episcopal cathedrals of the United States
- List of cathedrals in Florida
