= Episcopal Diocese of Central Florida =

Episcopal Church diocese in the US

Coordinates: 28.5457°N 81.3660°W

Diocese of Central Florida

Location
- Country: United States
- Ecclesiastical province: Province IV

Statistics
- Congregations: 82 (2024)
- Members: 22,131 (2023)

Information
- Denomination: Episcopal Church
- Established: December 3, 1969
- Cathedral: Cathedral of St Luke

Current leadership
- Bishop: Justin S. Holcomb

Map
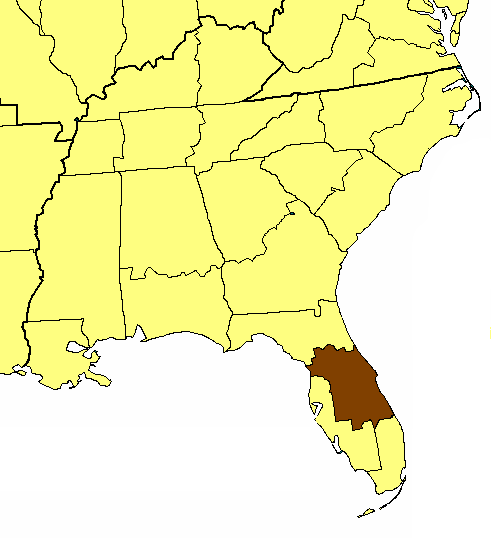
- Location of the Diocese of Central Florida

Website
- www.cfdiocese.org

The Episcopal Diocese of Central Florida is a diocese in Florida in Province IV of the Episcopal Church. It is bounded on the north by the Episcopal Diocese of Florida, on the east by the Atlantic Ocean, on the south by the dioceses of Southeast Florida and Southwest Florida and on the west by the Gulf of Mexico. The two largest cities in the diocese are Orlando, with over 220,000 people, and Port St. Lucie, with over 150,000 people. The Kennedy Space Center and Walt Disney World are located within the diocese. Orlando, where St. Luke's Cathedral is located, is the see city of the diocese.

The diocese includes 15 counties, as follows: Brevard, Citrus, Hardee, Highlands, Indian River, Lake, Okeechobee, Orange, Osceola, Marion, Polk, Seminole, St. Lucie, Sumter and Volusia.

The diocese reported 27,885 members in 2015 and 22,131 members in 2023; no membership statistics were reported in 2024 national parochial reports. Plate and pledge income for the 82 filing congregations of the diocese in 2024 was $27,541,876. Average Sunday attendance (ASA) in 2024 was 9,023 persons, a relative decrease from 12,897 reported in 2015.

== History ==
In 1969 the Diocese of Central Florida, the Diocese of Southeast Florida, and the Diocese of Southwest Florida were created out of a division of the large Diocese of South Florida. Bishop Henry I. Louttit, Bishop of South Florida presided over the primary Conventions of each new diocese for the purpose of electing their Diocesan Bishops. The two Suffragan Bishops of South Florida were elected to be Diocesan Bishops in the areas in which they had been living and serving. Bishop William H. Folwell was elected to become the second Bishop of Central Florida.

On January 29, 2000 at the 31st Convention of the Diocese, held in Orlando, the delegates approved a new vision for the diocese which called for the revitalization of existing congregations and the establishment of 15 new congregations between 2001 and 2010. At the 34th Convention of the diocese, in January 2003, the diocese kicked off From Strength to Strength - a campaign to fund the new vision approved in 2000. In 2004, at the 35th Convention, the diocese became a member of the Anglican Communion Network, a decision which was reversed when the diocese withdrew from the Network in 2008.

The diocese comprises five deaneries: Central, Northeast, Northwest, Southeast, and Southwest. As of 2006 there were 75 parishes and 11 missions in the diocese. The diocesan cathedral is the Cathedral Church of St. Luke in Orlando.

== List of bishops ==
Bishops of Central Florida
From	Until	Incumbent	Notes
1969	1970	Henry I. Louttit	Bishop of South Florida until 1969; also Bishop of Southeast Florida and of Southwest Florida.
1970	1989	William H. Folwell	William Hopkins "Bill" Folwell; previously suffragan bishop in the same area; retired.
1990	2012	John W. Howe	John Wadsworth Howe (born November 4, 1942); elected bishop coadjutor December 10, 1988; consecrated April 15, 1989; succeeded as diocesan bishop January 1, 1990; retired in 2012.
1995	2009	Hugo Pina-Lopez, Assisting Bishop	Hugo Luis Pina-Lopez (born November 3, 1938, Cuba); previously Bishop of Honduras; retired.
2003	2018	John L. Said, Assisting Bishop	John Lewis Said; retired suffragan from Southeast Florida.
2012	2023	Gregory Brewer	Gregory Orrin Brewer (born July 6, 1951, Richmond, VA); elected November 19, 2011; consecrated March 24, 2012.
2023	present	Justin S. Holcomb	Justin S. Holcomb was elected January 14, 2023 and consecrated June 10, 2023.
2025	present	Griselda Delgado del Carpio, Assisting Bishop	Previously Bishop of Cuba

== Diocesan organizations and facilities ==
Besides managing 7 retirement homes, 4 prep-schools, and 20 day schools the diocese has the following facilities:

- Camp Wingmann Church Camp
- Canterbury Retreat & Conference Center
- The Institute for Christian Studies

== See also ==
- William Crane Gray, first Bishop of the Missionary Jurisdiction of Southern Florida, which in 1922 became the Diocese of South Florida.
