= John Durham Wing =

American bishop (1882–1960)

The Right Reverend John Durham Wing
- Bishop of South Florida
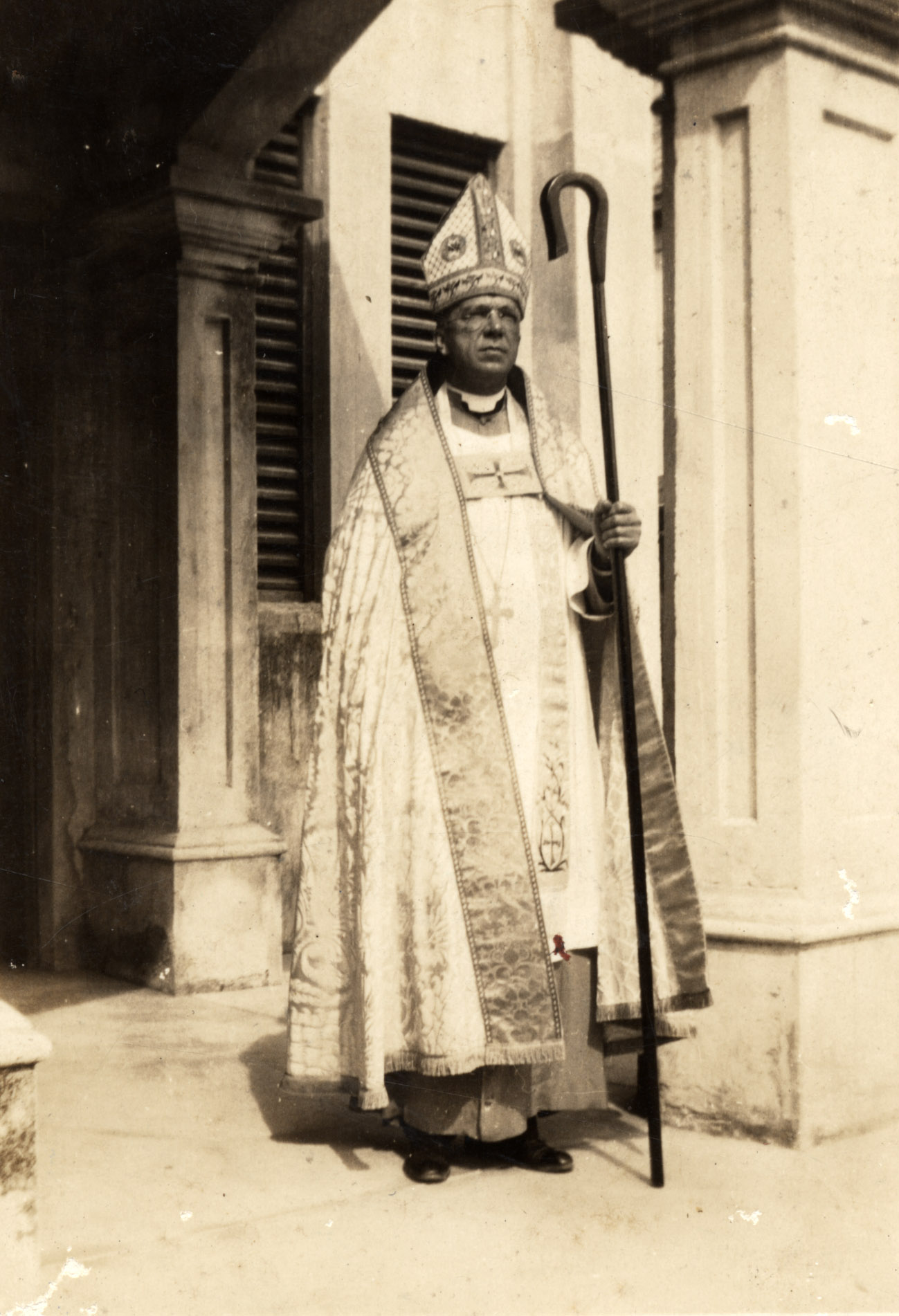
- Church: Episcopal Church
- Diocese: South Florida
- In office: 1932–1951
- Predecessor: Cameron Mann
- Successor: Henry I. Louttit Sr.
- Previous post: Coadjutor Bishop of South Florida (1925-1932)

Orders
- Ordination: July 3, 1910 by Cleland Kinloch Nelson
- Consecration: September 29, 1925 by Cameron Mann

Personal details
- Born: November 19, 1882 Atlanta, Georgia, United States
- Died: February 29, 1960 (aged 77) Orlando, Florida, United States
- Buried: Palm Cemetery, Winter Park, Florida
- Denomination: Anglican
- Parents: John Durham Wing and Sallie Miller Peeples
- Spouse: Mary Catherine Ammons
- Children: 4
- Education: University of Georgia

John Durham Wing (November 19, 1882 – February 29, 1960) was the second bishop of the Diocese of South Florida in The Episcopal Church, serving from 1932 to 1950. He was elected bishop coadjutor in 1925.

== Early life and education ==
Wing was born on November 19, 1882, in Atlanta, Georgia, the son of John Durham Wing and Sallie Miller Peeples. He was educated at the Atlanta public schools, before studying at the University of Georgia, from where he graduated with a Bachelor of Arts in 1903. He also studied business at the College of William & Mary in 1907. In 1910, he graduated with a Bachelor of Divinity from the Virginia Theological Seminary. Wing was awarded a Doctor of Divinity from the University of Georgia in 1918, from the University of the South in 1926, and from the Virginia Theological Seminary in 1926. In 1932, he was also awarded a Doctor of Laws from Rollins College.

== Ordained ministry ==
Wing was ordained deacon on June 26, 1909, and priest on July 3, 1910, by Bishop Cleland Kinloch Nelson of Atlanta. Between 1910 and 1912, he served as rector of the Church of the Holy Comforter in Atlanta, Georgia, and from 1912 till 1913, he served as rector of the Church of the Incarnation in Atlanta, Georgia. On March 31, 1913, he married Mary Catherine Ammons, and together had a total of four children. That same year, he transferred to Anniston, Alabama, to take up the post of rector of Grace Church. In 1915, he returned to Georgia to serve as rector of Christ Church in Savannah, Georgia. Between 1923 and 1925, he was rector of St Paul's Church in Chattanooga, Tennessee.

== Episcopacy ==
On May 6, 1925, Wing was elected Coadjutor Bishop of South Florida. He was consecrated on September 29, 1925, at St Paul's Church in Chattanooga, Tennessee, by the Bishop of South Florida Cameron Mann. He succeeded as diocesan bishop on February 8, 1932, and retired in 1950. During his episcopacy, he eliminated the diocesan debt and increased support for diocesan programs in social services. He died at the Orange memorial Hospital in Orlando, Florida, on February 29, 1960.
