= Cathedral Church of St. Luke (Orlando, Florida) =

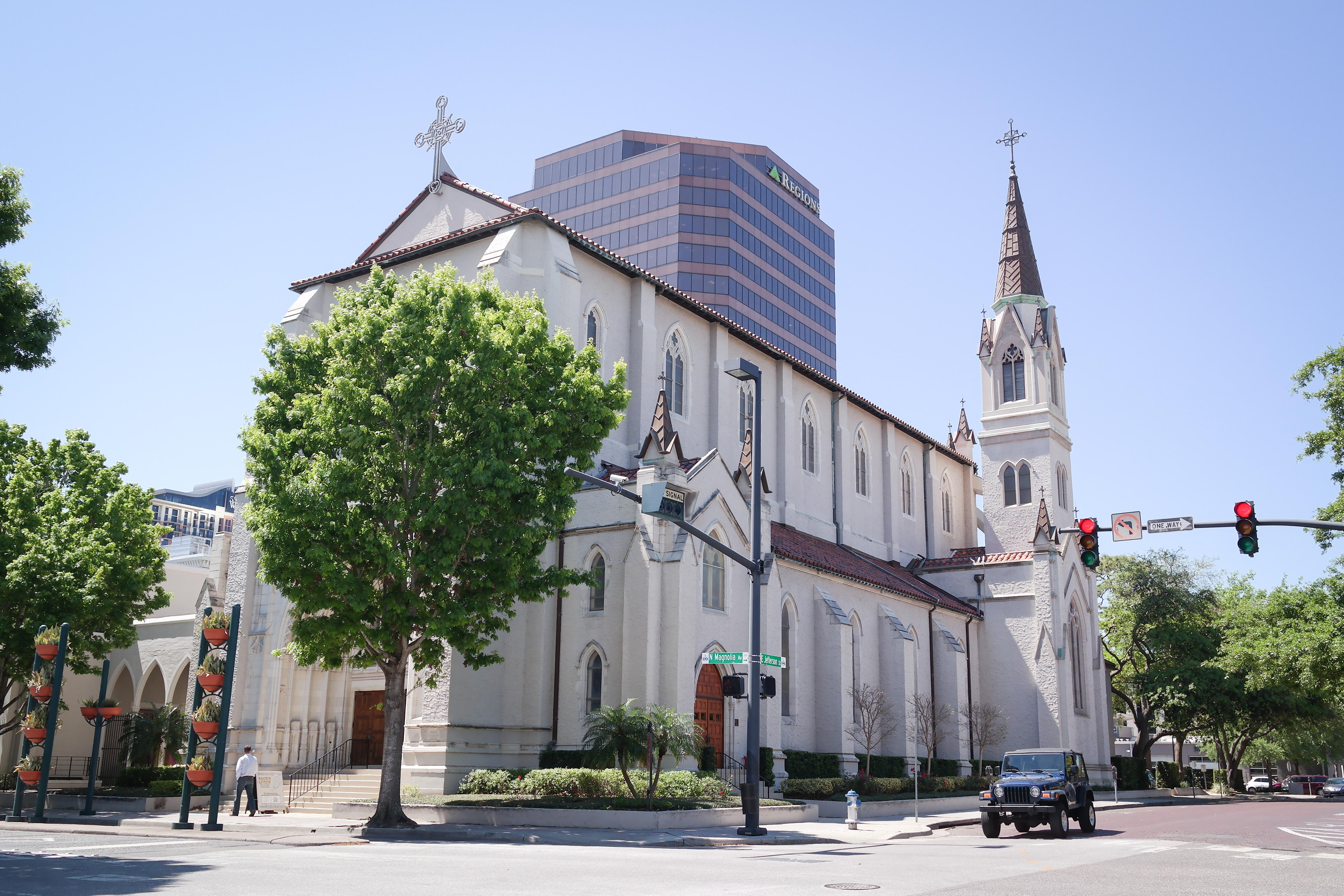

- Location within Florida
- 28°32′39.54″N 81°22′40.58″W
- Location: 130 N. Magnolia Ave. Orlando, Florida
- Country: United States
- Denomination: Episcopal Church
- Churchmanship: Anglo-Catholic
- Website: stlukescathedral.org

History
- Founded: 1892 (134 years ago)

Architecture
- Architect(s): Frohman, Robb, and Little
- Style: Gothic Revival
- Completed: 1926 (100 years ago)

Administration
- Diocese: Diocese of Central Florida

Clergy
- Bishop: The Rt. Rev. Dr. Justin S. Holcomb
- Dean: The Very Rev. Dr. Reggie Kidd

The Cathedral Church of St. Luke is an Episcopal cathedral in Orlando, Florida, United States. It is the seat of the Diocese of Central Florida. The church reported 1,113 members in 2015 and 943 members in 2023; no membership statistics were reported in 2024 parochial reports. Plate and pledge income reported for the congregation in 2024 was $1,057,453 with average Sunday attendance (ASA) of 334 persons. This was a relative decrease on ASA of 461 reported in 2016.

== History ==
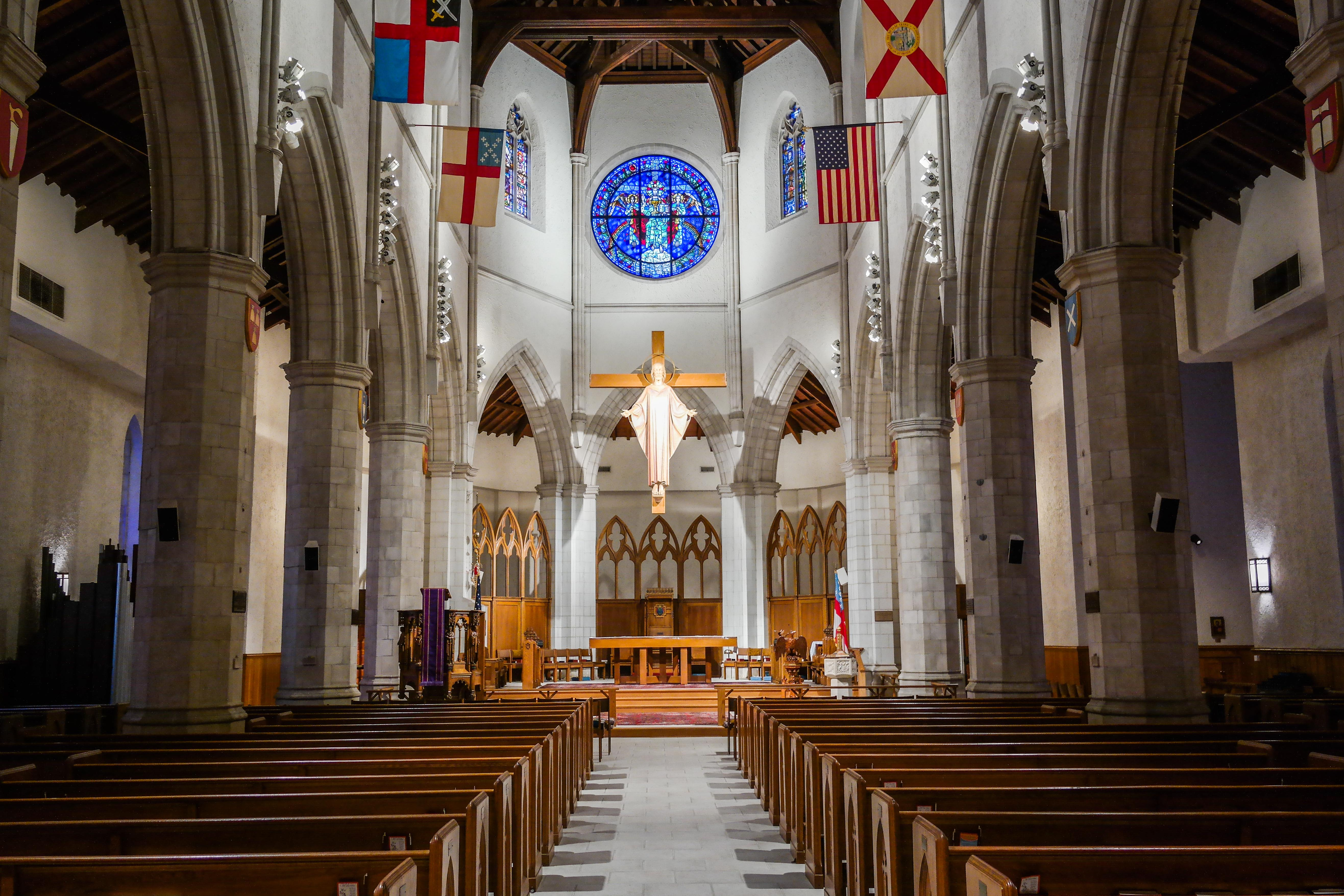
Cathedral chancel

The faith community of St. Luke's originated in the home of Francis Eppes (1801–1881), who was the grandson of Thomas Jefferson and an ardent Episcopal churchman and lay reader. Francis Eppes moved from Virginia to Tallahassee in 1826 and then to the sparsely settled town of Orlando in 1869. The Eppes, Shine, Summerlin, Westcott, and Greetham families formed a faithful group which became the nucleus for the formation of St. Luke's Mission, which formally organized in 1881 and achieved parish status in 1884.

The General Convention of the Episcopal Church established the Missionary Jurisdiction of South Florida and the Rev. William Crane Gray was elected and consecrated its first bishop. He made his home in Orlando and St. Luke's was designated as the Cathedral Church for South Florida on March 31, 1902. The first cathedral dean was the Rev. Lucien A. Spencer. It was decided that a new cathedral was needed and so the old church was moved in 1922 to make way for a new building. The Boston architectural firm of Frohman, Robb, and Little, who designed the Washington National Cathedral, was chosen to design Orlando's new cathedral.

On April 13, 1925, the Rt. Rev. Cameron Mann laid the cornerstone and by 1926 the building was only partially constructed, but usable. A financial depression was affecting Florida at the time and there was no money to complete it at that time so a temporary wall was constructed at the altar end of the church. When the Very Rev. Charles T. Gaskell was dean from 1971 to 1973, the nave was renovated, the choir gallery was built over the narthex and an 88-rank pipe organ was installed. In a construction project from 1986 to 1987, the temporary wall was removed and the cathedral was completed similar to its original plans when the Very Rev. Harry Sherman was dean. The completed cathedral includes an apse, ambulatory, priests and working sacristies, a bell tower and the St. Mary Chapel.

== Orlando Deanery Boychoir and Girls Choir ==
The Cathedral Church of Saint Luke is also the home of the Orlando Deanery Boychoir and Girls Choir. It is founded on European models and affiliated with the Royal School of Church Music in England. It is also a music outreach program of the Cathedral Church of Saint Luke. In addition to being cultural ambassadors of the United States and the City of Orlando, they have toured around the world (most recently in England). In 2011, they were issued a special invitation and performed in the East Wing of the White House in Washington D.C. In June 2014, they participated in the inaugural American Music Performance Nationals for Children's & Youth Choirs in New York City at Carnegie Hall. They also performed at Saint Thomas Church in Manhattan and St Paul's Chapel in Lower Manhattan.

== Pipe organ ==
The cathedral organ was the last instrument built by the Tellers Organ Company, of Erie, Pennsylvania, and one of their largest. The 88-rank electro-pneumatic organ was designed to be an eclectic and versatile instrument, and was installed in a newly constructed rear gallery. The dedicatory recital was played on October 21, 1973, by Paul Jenkins, organ professor of Stetson University.

== See also ==
- List of the Episcopal cathedrals of the United States
- List of cathedrals in Florida
- High church
- Oxford Movement
