= Bill Stough =

American prelate (1928–2004)

The Right Reverend Furman Charles Stough D.D.
- Bishop of Alabama
- Church: Episcopal Church
- Diocese: Alabama
- Elected: December 15, 1970
- In office: 1971–1988
- Predecessor: George M. Murray
- Successor: Robert O. Miller

Orders
- Ordination: December 1955 by Charles Carpenter
- Consecration: February 18, 1971 by John E. Hines

Personal details
- Born: July 11, 1928 Montgomery, Alabama, United States
- Died: February 2, 2004 (aged 75) Birmingham, Alabama, United States
- Denomination: Anglican
- Parents: Furman Charles Stough & Martha Elizabeth Turnipseed
- Spouse: Margaret Dargan McCaa (m. May 12, 1951)
- Children: 2
- Education: Sewanee: The University of the South

Furman Charles "Bill" Stough (July 11, 1928 – February 2, 2004) was an American prelate who served as the eighth Episcopal Church Bishop of Alabama from 1971 until 1988.

== Early life and education ==
Stough was born on July 11, 1928, in Montgomery, Alabama, the son of Furman Charles Stough and Martha Elizabeth Turnipseed. He was educated at Sewanee: The University of the South and graduated with a Bachelor of Arts in political science in 1951.

That same year, on May 12, he married Margaret Dargan McCaa. They would become the parents of two children. He studied for a Bachelor of Divinity at Sewanee and graduated in 1955. Sewanee also awarded him with a Doctor of Divinity in 1971.

== Ordained ministry ==
Stough was ordained deacon on May 29, 1955, by George M. Murray, Suffragan Bishop of Alabama. He was then ordained priest in December of the same year by Charles Carpenter, Bishop of Alabama. He then served as rector of St. Andrew's Church in Sylacauga, Alabama, and St. Mary's Church in Childersburg, Alabama, from 1955 till 1959. Later, in 1959, he became rector of Grace Church in Sheffield, Alabama, where he remained until 1965.

In 1965, he became a missioner in Japan and served as priest-in-charge of All Souls Church in Machinato, Okinawa Island. He then returned to the United States in 1968 and served as a missioner in Alabama. In 1970 he was appointed as rector of St. John's Church in Decatur, Alabama, where he served only briefly before his election to the Alabama episcopate.

== Bishop ==
On December 15, 1970, during a special convention held at the Church of the Advent, Stough was elected Bishop of Alabama. He was consecrated on February 18, 1971, by Presiding Bishop John E. Hines. During his time in Alabama, he guided the Diocese in adapting to the ordination of women (in 1976, something implemented cautiously in Alabama) and accepting the revised prayer book in 1979, despite considerable resistance from tradition-minded parishioners, something that led to the formation in some places, mostly in metropolitan areas, of Continuing Anglican congregations as conservative alternatives to ECUSA. It was also during his episcopate that the Church of the Advent was raised to the status of a cathedral. He is also credited for establishing a link between the Diocese of Alabama and the Diocese of Namibia.

Between 1978 and 1988, the Diocese of Alabama managed to contribute more than $400,000 to the Diocese of Namibia. In 1987, Stough also ordained the first black priest in Alabama since 1953. During his tenure, in the 1970s, Alabama became the first diocese in the entire Episcopal Church to mandate that congregations be self-supporting, electing their own clergy (i.e., no more "missions" with appointed "vicars"), and foregoing diocesan financial subsidies, with only newly formed churches receiving them for a limited period of time. With some modifications, this policy has continued to the present day. During Stough's years, the Episcopal Church nationally began a period of numerical decline in communicants and Sunday attendance that has continued to the present. This did not happen in Alabama, with, in fact, the Diocese growing in existing parishes and church planting throughout the 1970s and 1980s, something that persists to this day.

In February 1988, he announced his intention to resign as Bishop of Alabama in order to accept an appointment as senior executive for planning for the Episcopal Church and deputy for the Presiding Bishop's Fund for World Relief. He resigned in October 1988. In 1993 he returned to Alabama and became bishop-in-residence at St. Luke's Church in Mountain Brook, Alabama, a Birmingham suburb. He died in Birmingham on February 2, 2004.
