= Richard T. Lawson =

American Episcopal Bishop

The Right Reverend Richard T. Lawson, III
- Thirteenth Bishop of Alabama
- Church: Episcopal Church
- Diocese: Alabama
- Elected: January 31, 2026
- Installed: June 27, 2026
- Predecessor: Glenda Curry
- Previous posts: Dean and Rector, Cathedral of St. John in the Wilderness, Denver, Colorado (2017-2026) Rector. Grace-St. Luke's Episcopal Church and School, Memphis. TN (2010-2017) Rector. St. John's Episcopal Church, Decatur, AL (2004-2010)

Orders
- Ordination: 2001 (deacon) by Onell Soto; 2001 (priest) by Henry N. Parsley Jr.
- Consecration: June 27, 2026 by Sean Rowe

Personal details
- Born: 1974 (age 51–52) Guntersville, Alabama, US
- Denomination: Anglican
- Spouse: Katherine Lawson
- Children: 2
- Education: Auburn University, B.A., 1997 General Theological Seminary, M.Div.. 2001 University of the South, M.S.T., 2009
- Alma mater: Auburn University; General Theological Seminary; University of the South

Richard T. Lawson, III is the bishop of the Episcopal Diocese of Alabama.

He was born in Guntersville, Alabama in 1974 and grew up in the United Methodist Church. He was elected on the first ballot at the diocesan convention on January 31, 2026, and was ordained and consecrated at the Cathedral Church of the Advent on June 27, 2026. The primary consecrator was Presiding Bishop Sean Rowe.

He attended Auburn University where he majored in religion and met his future wife, Katheriine, who was a life long Episcopalian and suggested that he attend an Episcopal Church. They were married in 1998.

Ordained to the priesthood in 2001, after graduating from General Theological Seminary, Lawson served at St. John's Episcopal Church in Decatur, Alabama, from 2001-2010; Grace-St. Luke's Episcopal Church in Memphis, Tennessee, 2010-2017; and the Cathedral of St. John in the Wilderness in Denver, Colorado, 2017-2026.

== Personal ==
He is married to Katherine, with whom he has two children.

== Bibliography ==
- "Gregory of Nyssa on the Song of Songs: Is the Erotic Left Behind?" in Sewanee Theological Review, 2010.
- “Mysticism and Pragmatism in Modern Religious Architecture” in Anglican Theological Review (Spring 2017)
- "Three Sketches of Symbols and Sacraments" in Reasonable Radical? Reading the Writings of Martyn Percy (edited by Ian Markham and Joshua Daniel) ISBN 978-1498242844

== See also ==
- List of Episcopal bishops of the United States
- Historical list of the Episcopal bishops of the United States
