= Milton L. Wood =

American Episcopalian bishop

The Right Reverend Milton LeGrand Wood D.D.
- Suffragan Bishop of Atlanta
- Church: Episcopal Church
- Diocese: Atlanta
- Elected: April 4, 1967
- In office: 1967–1974

Orders
- Ordination: August 24, 1946 by Charles Carpenter
- Consecration: June 19, 1967 by John E. Hines

Personal details
- Born: August 22, 1922 Selma, Alabama, United States
- Died: July 16, 2015 (aged 92) Montgomery, Alabama, United States
- Denomination: Anglican
- Parents: Milton LeGrand & Roberta Owen Hawkins
- Spouse: Ann Linwood Scott (m. 1949)
- Children: 4
- Education: Sewanee: The University of the South

Milton LeGrand Wood III (August 21, 1922 – July 16, 2015) was a bishop suffragan in the Episcopal Diocese of Atlanta from 1967 to 1974.

== Background ==
Wood was born in Selma, Alabama, on August 21, 1922, to Milton Wood Sr. and Roberta Hawkins Wood. He attended the University of the South, receiving his bachelor's degree and later his Master of Divinity, graduating in 1945. Bishop Carpenter of the Episcopal Diocese of Alabama ordained him as a deacon on November 18, 1945, in St. John's Episcopal Church (Montgomery, Alabama), and later as a priest on August 24, 1946. In 1949, Milton Wood married Ann Scott.

In 1963, Bishop Randolph Royall Claiborne Jr. of the Episcopal Diocese of Atlanta called Father Wood to serve as Canon to the Ordinary. He also served as rector of All Saints' Church, Atlanta, Georgia for eight years, having also served at the Appleton Home in Macon, Georgia. In 1967 he was elected bishop suffragan to assist Bishop Claiborne. He served in that capacity until 1974 when he was called to New York City to serve as the executive for administration at the Episcopal Church Center. He retired in 1984 and died in 2015 at Montgomery, Alabama at the age of 92.

=== Consecrators ===
- John Elbridge Hines, 22nd presiding bishop of the Episcopal Church USA
- Charles C. J. Carpenter, 6th bishop of Alabama
- Randolph Royall Claiborne Jr., 5th bishop of Atlanta

N.B.: 625th bishop consecrated in the Episcopal Church.
