= Henry Melville Jackson =

American assistant bishop

The Right Reverend Henry Melville Jackson D.D.
- Assistant Bishop of Alabama
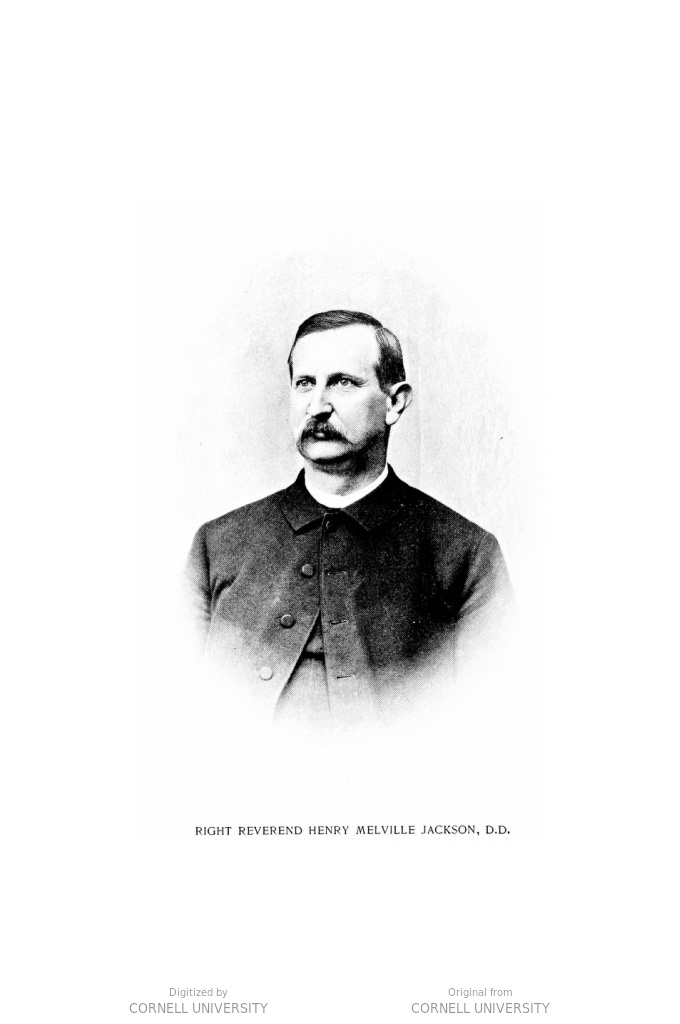
- Church: Episcopal Church
- Diocese: Alabama
- Elected: October 29, 1890
- In office: 1891–1900

Orders
- Ordination: July 15, 1874 by John Johns
- Consecration: January 21, 1891 by Richard Hooker Wilmer

Personal details
- Born: July 28, 1840 Leesburg, Virginia, United States
- Died: May 4, 1900 (aged 59) Eufaula, Alabama, United States
- Buried: Fairview Cemetery, Eufaula, Alabama
- Denomination: Anglican
- Parents: Samuel Keerl Jackson & Anna Maria Calvert
- Spouse: Rebecca Janney Lloyd; Violet Lee Pace; Caroline Toney Cochrane
- Children: 7
- Education: Virginia Military Institute

Henry Melville Jackson (July 28, 1840 – May 4, 1900) was an assistant bishop of the Episcopal Diocese of Alabama from 1891 till 1900.

== Education ==
Jackson was born on July 28, 1840, in Leesburg, Virginia, the son of Samuel Keerl Jackson and Anna Maria Calvert. He was educated at the Virginia Military Institute and later studied at the Virginia Theological Seminary from where he graduated in 1873. He received a Doctor of Divinity from Randolph–Macon College in 1885 and another from Sewanee: The University of the South in 1891.

== Ordained ministry ==
He was ordained deacon in the Immanuel Chapel, Alexandria, Virginia, on June 27, 1873, and priest in St John's Church, Wytheville, Virginia, on July 15, 1874, on both occasions by Bishop John Johns of Virginia. He then served in the Montgomery parish, in the county of the same name and at Christ Church in Greenville, South Carolina. In October 1876, he became rector of Grace Church in Richmond, Virginia, a post he retained till his elevation to the episcopate in 1891.

== Bishop ==
Jackson was elected Assistant Bishop of Alabama on October 29, 1890, in Selma, Alabama. He was then consecrated on January 21, 1891, by Richard Hooker Wilmer of Alabama in St Paul's Church, Selma, Alabama. He had to resign his bishopric in April 1900 due to failing health and in fact he died less than a month later on May 4, 1900.

== Family ==
On July 24, 1873, Jackson married Rebecca Janney Lloyd and together had a child who died in infancy. After her death he remarried on April 21, 1880, to Violet Lee Pace, who died in 1893. They had four children together, two of whom died young. On April 17, 1895, he married again, this time to Caroline Toney Cochrane and had two children together.
