= Charles Minnigerode Beckwith =

American bishop

The Right Reverend Charles Minnigerode Beckwith
- Bishop of Alabama
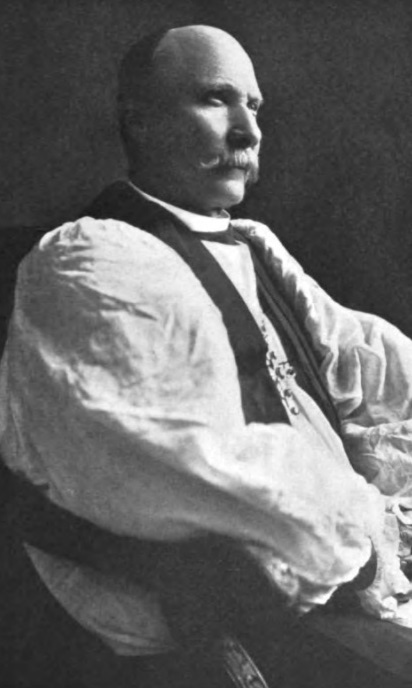
- Beckwith in 1913
- Church: Episcopal Church
- Diocese: Alabama
- Elected: October 8, 1902
- In office: 1902–1928
- Predecessor: Robert Woodward Barnwell
- Successor: William G. McDowell

Orders
- Ordination: 1881 by John W. Beckwith
- Consecration: December 17, 1902 by Thomas Underwood Dudley

Personal details
- Born: June 2, 1851 Petersburg, Virginia, United States
- Died: April 18, 1928 (aged 76) Montgomery, Alabama, United States
- Buried: Greenwood Cemetery (Montgomery, Alabama)
- Denomination: Anglican
- Parents: Thomas Stanley Beckwith & Agnes Ruffin
- Spouse: Susan Rainsford Fairbanks (m. 1884-1885); Lucy Cocke (m. 1888-1891); Mary Belle Cameron (m. 1897-1928)
- Children: 2

Charles Minnigerode Beckwith (June 2, 1851 – April 18, 1928) was fourth bishop of the Episcopal Diocese of Alabama from 1902 till 1928.

== Early life and education ==
Beckwith was born on June 2, 1851, in Petersburg, Virginia, son of Thomas Stanley Beckwith and Agnes Ruffin. He was educated at the University of Georgia from where he graduated with a Bachelor of Arts in 1873. He was also a member of Phi Delta Theta. After graduation, he served as assistant professor of mathematics at the University of the South between 1874 and 1876 and later served as master of Sewanee Grammar School at the University of the South from 1876 till 1879. In 1879, he enrolled at the Berkeley Divinity School in Middletown, Connecticut and graduated in 1881. He received an honorary Doctor of Divinity from Sewanee: The University of the South in 1902 and an honorary Doctor of Sacred Theology from Berkeley in 1903.

== Ordained ministry ==
He was ordained to the diaconate and priesthood in 1881 by his uncle, Bishop John W. Beckwith of Georgia. He served as rector of St. Luke's Church in Atlanta, Georgia, from 1884 to 1886. While rector he was elected Assistant Bishop of Texas but declined the appointment. Later, in 1886, he became rector of Christ Church in Houston, Texas, and in 1892 became rector of Trinity Church in Galveston, Texas, where he remained until 1902.

== Bishop ==
Beckwith was elected Bishop of Alabama on October 8, 1902, during a special council which took place in St John's Church in Montgomery, Alabama. He was then consecrated in St Paul's Church in Selma, Alabama on December 17, 1902, with Bishop Thomas Underwood Dudley of Kentucky as chief consecrator. He died in office on April 18, 1928, in Montgomery, Alabama.

== Works ==
- The Trinity Course of Church Instruction (New York, 1898)
- The Teacher's Companion to the Trinity Course (New York, 1901)
- What Is the Matter with the Church? (Montgomery: Paragon Press, 1926)
