= Charles Wheelock =

Charles Wheelock may refer to:

- Colonel Charles Wheelock (1812–1865), organizer and commanding officer of the 97th New York Infantry Regiment in the Union Army during the American Civil War
- Charles Wheelock (architect) (1833–1910), American architect
- Charles Wheelock, actor in films including To Be Called For
