= Glenda S. Curry =

American Episcopal Bishop, college president (born 1953)

The Right Reverend Glenda S. Curry Ph.D.
- Twelfth Bishop of Alabama
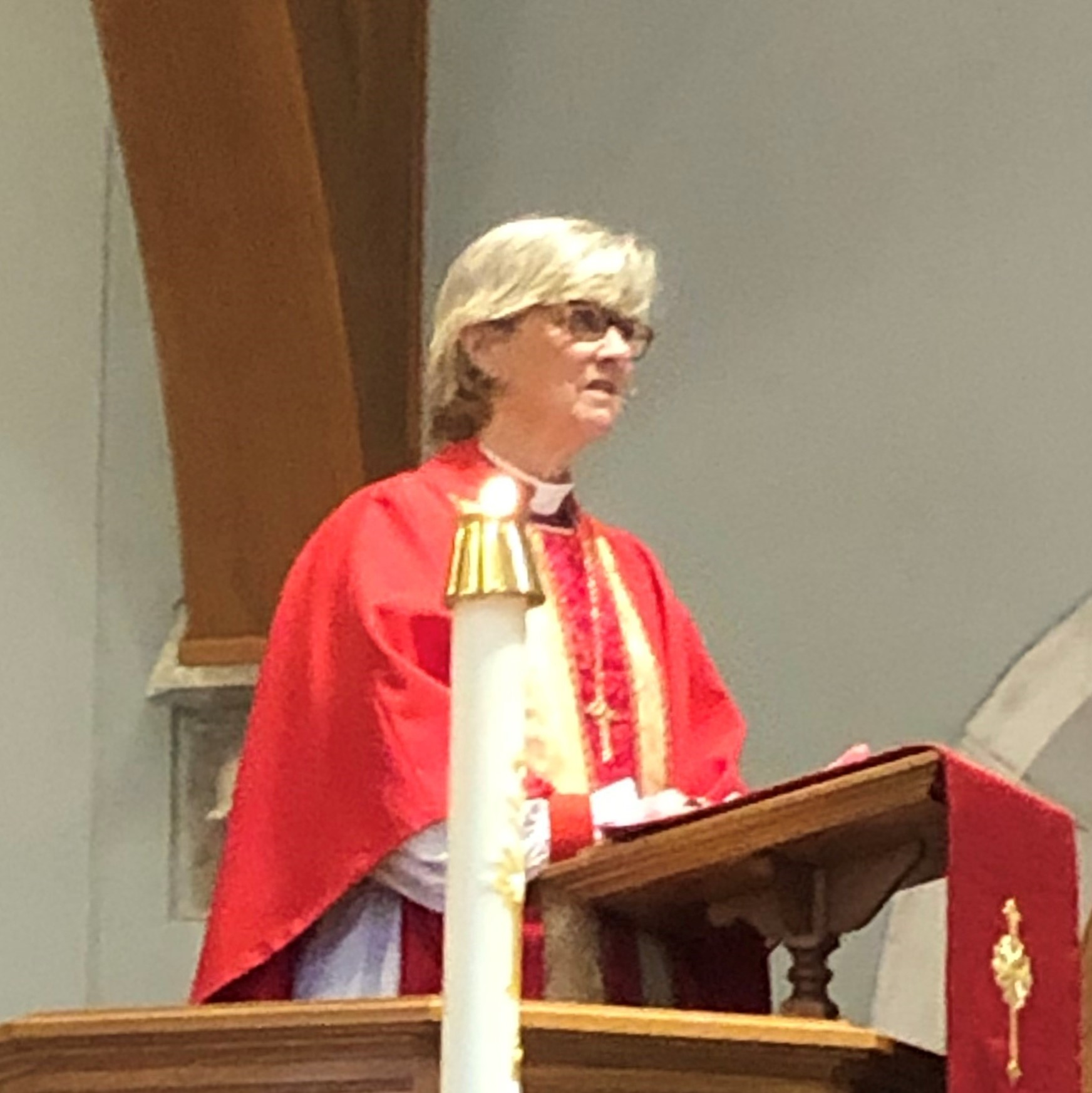
- Curry preaching at All Saints' Episcopal Church, Homewood, Alabama, April 2021
- Church: Episcopal Church
- Diocese: Alabama
- Elected: January 18, 2020
- Installed: January 9, 2021
- Term ended: June 27, 2026
- Predecessor: Kee Sloan
- Successor: Richard T. Lawson
- Previous posts: Rector, All Saints' Episcopal Church, Homewood, Alabama (2004–2020) Rector, Episcopal Church of the Epiphany, Leeds, Alabama (2002–2004)

Orders
- Ordination: May 29, 2002 (deacon); December 3, 2002 (priest) by Henry N. Parsley Jr.
- Consecration: June 27, 2020 by Scott Benhase

Personal details
- Born: June 20, 1953 (age 73) United States
- Denomination: Anglican
- Spouse: William Curry
- Children: 2
- Education: University of South Carolina

Glenda S. Curry (born June 20, 1953) was the twelfth bishop of the Episcopal Diocese of Alabama. In an earlier career as a nurse and college administrator she was president of Troy State University at Montgomery from 1991 to 1999 where she helped created the Rosa Parks Library and Museum.

She was the first woman to lead a four-year university in Alabama and the first woman to serve as an Episcopal bishop in any of the five Deep South states. She succeeded Kee Sloan on January 9, 2021. At the time of her investiture, she was one of three women serving as bishops of Protestant denominations in Birmingham, Alabama. At the diocesan convention in January 2025, she called for the election of her successor since she would reach the mandatory retirement age of 72 in June 2025. In January 2026, Richard T. Lawson was elected to succeed her, she served until his consecration and installation on June 27, 2026.

== Education and career ==
Curry was raised in South Carolina and was first introduced to the Episcopal Church while a student at the University of South Carolina in Columbia. Her first career was in nursing. She received a B.S.N. from the University of South Carolina in 1974, a M.S.N. from the University of Alabama in 1979, and a Ph.D. from Oklahoma State University in 1984.

She served on the faculty of the college of nursing at the University of Tulsa (1980–84) and as chairperson of the department of nursing at Southeast Missouri State University from 1984 to 1988. Moving to Alabama, she held several administrative positions at the University of Alabama at Birmingham and Troy University before becoming the first woman to lead a four-year university in Alabama in 1991. She served as president of Troy State University at Montgomery until 1999. At the Montgomery campus she oversaw the creation of the Rosa Parks Museum and Library and the transformation of the urban campus. Curry Commons is named in her honor.

She was a parishioner at St. John's Episcopal Church in Montgomery at the time she received her call to ordained ministry. She studied for the ministry at the University of the South receiving the M.Div. (with honors) in 2002. She served as rector of the Episcopal Church of the Epiphany in Leeds, Alabama, from 2002 to 2004, and of All Saints' Episcopal Church in the Birmingham, Alabama, suburb of Homewood from August 1, 2004 to May 31, 2020.

She was elected bishop coadjutor by the Diocese of Alabama on the second ballot on January 18, 2020, at the Cathedral Church of the Advent in Birmingham. There were three other candidates. The election took place during a celebration of the Holy Eucharist observing the Feast of the Confession of St. Peter. She is the first woman to serve as a bishop in the Episcopal Church in Alabama. She is also the oldest woman to ever be consecrated bishop by the Episcopal Church. She was ordained bishop on June 27, 2020, and served as bishop coadjutor until the retirement of Bishop Kee Sloan at the end of 2020. She was invested as diocesan bishop on January 9, 2021 at the Cathedral Church of the Advent in Birmingham.

In December 2022, Curry was elected to the board of trustees of the University of the South.

== Personal details ==
She is married to William Curry, M.D., professor of medicine at the University of Alabama in Birmingham. They have two married daughters and seven grandchildren.
