= Eliza Hall Nutt Parsley =

American civic leader and educator

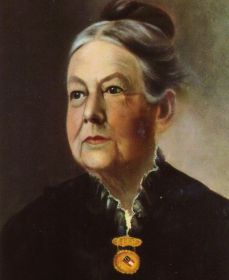

President of North Carolina Division of the United Daughters of the Confederacy
- In role 1867–1869

Personal details
- Born: Eliza Hall Nutt; August 13, 1842 Wilmington, North Carolina, U.S.
- Died: June 11, 1920 (aged 77) Wilmington, North Carolina, U.S.
- Resting place: Oakdale Cemetery
- Spouse: William Murdock Parsley
- Children: 2
- Parent(s): Henry Nutt; Luisa Frink
- Relatives: Henry N. Parsley Jr.
- Education: St. Mary's School
- Occupation: schoolteacher, headmistress, civic leader

Eliza Hall "Hallie" Nutt Parsley (August 13, 1842 – June 11, 1920) was an American civic leader and educator. She worked as a school teacher after the American Civil War and established her own school for children in Wilmington, North Carolina, in 1894, four years before the Wilmington massacre. A war widow, she was active in glorifying the Confederacy through her role as a member of the Ladies' Memorial Association, raising money to build Confederate monuments in North Carolina. Parsley became a prominent figure within the United Daughters of the Confederacy, establishing the Cape Fear Chapter in 1894 and the North Carolina Division in 1897. She served as president of the North Carolina Division of the United Daughters of the Confederacy for two years, travelling across North Carolina to recruit new members and promote the pseudohistorical narrative of the Lost Cause of the Confederacy. Under her leadership, in 1898, the Cape Fear chapter established the Cape Fear Museum of History and Science.

== Early life and family ==
Parsley was born Eliza Hall Nutt in Wilmington, North Carolina on August 13, 1842, to Henry Nutt and Louise Frink Nutt. She was educated at St. Mary's School in Raleigh.

She married Captain William Murdock Parsley, an officer in the Confederate States Army, on September 2, 1862. They had two daughters, Amanda and Janie. Parsley was Episcopalian. She is the grandaunt of the Episcopalian bishop Henry N. Parsley Jr.

== Civil War ==
During the American Civil War, her husband was wounded three times and sent home to recover. He was later promoted to the rank of lieutenant-colonel, but was killed shortly after near Richmond, just a few days before the surrender at Appomattox.

Parsley and her daughters took refuge at Sleepy Hollow in Bladen County and at Floral College in Robeson County. While the war was ongoing, she nursed wounded Confederate soldiers.

== Life after the war ==
Parsley and her daughters returned to Wilmington, where she took up work as a schoolteacher, opening her own school for children in 1894. She dressed in black mourning dress, a black bonnet and long crepe veil, and wore her hair parted down the middle and combed back for the remainder of her life, which was typical of many Confederate widows. As a war widow, she became active in multiple organizations upholding the Lost Cause of the Confederacy. She volunteered with the Confederate Memorial Association and decorated the graves of seven hundred Confederate soldiers in Wilmington. While working with the memorial association, she and other members learned about the United Daughters of the Confederacy, which had been established in other southern states but not North Carolina. She was appointed as the chairwoman of a committee tasked with inquiring about the purpose of the United Daughters of the Confederacy, and received information, a charter, and authority to establish units in North Carolina from the original chapter in Nashville, Tennessee. Her inquiry was answered by Anna Davenport Raines, the vice president of the national organization, who encouraged Parsley to apply for a charter with the authority to form individual chapters. The charter was granted and organized with over fifty members. Parsley and her chapter when then informed that only lineal descendants of Confederate veterans were eligible, which excluded wives, sisters, and mothers of veterans from joining the organization. Parsley took this matter in writing before the National Convention on March 30, 1894, in Nashville, addressing her concerns to Raines and the organization's president, Caroline Meriwether Goodlett, and was successful in having the clause on eligibility amended. In December 1894, Parsley organized the Cape Fear Chapter of the United Daughters of the Confederacy with twenty-four women applicants, calling their first meeting on December 27.

On April 28, 1897, she formed the United Daughters of the Confederacy's North Carolina Division, serving as the division's president for two years. Their first state convention was held in Wilmington on October 3, 1897, with representatives from six chapters in attendance. In her role as president, she advised women who wanted to establish new chapters and travelled around North Carolina promoting the Lost Cause narrative. Under her leadership, the Cape Fear chapter established the Cape Fear Museum of History and Science in March 1898.

A supporter of the dramatic arts, Parsley also arranged and organized productions of amateur plays, pageants, and musicals in Wilmington in the 1890s.

She died on June 11, 1920, and is buried at Oakdale Cemetery.
