= St. John's Episcopal Church (Roanoke, Virginia) =

Historic church in Virginia, United States

- U.S. National Register of Historic Places
- Virginia Landmarks Register
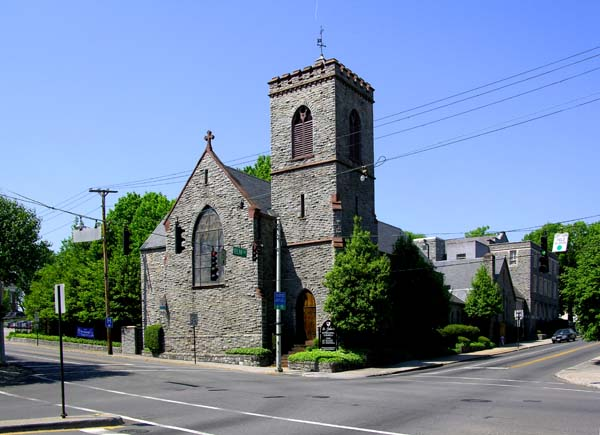
- St. John's Episcopal Church, June 2010

- Location within Virginia Location within the United States
- Location: 1 Mountain Ave SW, Roanoke, Virginia
- Coordinates: 37°16′0″N 79°56′30″W
- Area: 0.8 acres (0.32 ha)
- Built: 1891–1892, 1923
- Architect: Burns, Charles Marquedant; et al.
- Architectural style: Gothic, Tudor Revival
- NRHP reference No.: 91001083
- VLR No.: 128-0236

Significant dates
- Added to NRHP: August 23, 1991
- Designated VLR: June 19, 1991

St. John's Episcopal Church is a historic Episcopal church in Roanoke, Virginia, United States. It was built in 1891–1892, and is a Gothic style limestone church designed by Charles M. Burns of Philadelphia. The building is a nave-plan, clerestory-style church that includes a corner bell tower and a narthex and chapel in the rear. A Tudor Revival style parish house was constructed in 1923. The church's congregation is one of the city's oldest, and has included many prominent local, state, and national leaders. The church was listed on the National Register of Historic Places in 1991.

== History ==
St. John's origins date to the 1830s, when Nicholas H. Cobbs, a reverend of the Bedford parish, came to the Roanoke Valley to preach. Cobbs was also responsible for the establishment of St. Mark's in Fincastle, and would eventually become the first Bishop of Alabama. St. John's grew until, by 1850, it became an independent parish. Its first church building was built in Gainesborough (later Gainsboro), and in 1876 moved to the neighboring town of Big Lick.

In 1881 it was announced that Big Lick would be the location of the junction of the Shenandoah Valley Railroad and the Norfolk and Western Railway (N&W), with both companies moving their headquarters to the small town. Three years and a population boom later, the town became the City of Roanoke. St. John's membership grew along with the new city. A popular residential area developed south of the city center, and when a lot came available there at the corner of Jefferson Street and Elm Avenue in 1891, a parishioner purchased it for the purpose of moving the church. The decision to relocate the church was not unanimous, and a number of congregants left to form Christ Episcopal Church.

The new St. John's building was completed on the site in 1892. It was designed by Charles M. Burns, a Philadelphia-based architect who was a prolific builder of Episcopal churches in Pennsylvania. Burns was likely influenced in his design by Philadelphia's Church of St. James the Less, which he had worked on early in his career. St. John's was built in the late Gothic Revival style and constructed with blue-gray limestone ashlar. The building was designed as a clerestory church, utilizing a low roof over the church's aisles and a high roof over the nave. This design allowed for a long row of high windows in the church, increasing light and ventilation, while also removing the need for exterior buttressing. A contemporary news account described this style of church as being unique in Virginia at the time. The nave has a hammerbeam roof with arcading and features many stained glass windows, including one signed by Louis C. Tiffany. A three-story bell tower stands to the northeast of the nave, though a bell was not added until 1989. The church also includes a sanctuary, two-story sacristy, and a gable-roofed chapel. The chapel, initially a large one-story room, was subdivided into Sunday School rooms and expanded with a second story in 1907. A Tudor Revival parish house was added to the property in 1923, and connected to the main building via a 1958 addition. At the time of its construction the parish house included a 500-seat auditorium as well as a gymnasium, choir room, and offices.

When it opened in 1892, St. John's was the largest church in Roanoke, having been constructed with a seating capacity of 600 though having fewer than 250 members at the time. The church grew steadily along with the rapid development of Roanoke as a boomtown; it had around 425 members by 1903, and had more than doubled that number by 1923. An early warden of the church was George Plater Tayloe, a prominent businessman and one of the first trustees of the Valley Union Seminary which became Hollins University. Other members have included city councilmen, members of the Virginia General Assembly, and at least one U.S. Senator. Six presidents of N&W have also been members. The congregation's influence in the city was exercised in 1925 when the church was able to defeat a proposal to widen Jefferson Street and force the removal of St. John's altar.

In 1919, Southwest Virginia was granted its own diocese. As St. John's was the largest of the then 82 churches in the diocese, it was chosen as its home and the site of its offices. The offices were housed in the church until a new building was established nearby in 1949. The new office was funded by a grant from Lettie Pate Whitehead Evans, a member of Coca-Cola's board of directors and a prominent Episcopalian from Hot Springs, Virginia. The building was named Evans House in her honor.
