= Robert Woodward Barnwell (bishop) =

American bishop

The Right Reverend Robert Woodward Barnwell D.D.
- Bishop of Alabama
- Church: Episcopal Church
- Diocese: Alabama
- Elected: May 18, 1900
- In office: 1900–1902
- Predecessor: Richard Hooker Wilmer
- Successor: Charles Minnigerode Beckwith

Orders
- Ordination: 1875 by John W. Beckwith
- Consecration: July 25, 1900 by Hugh Miller Thompson

Personal details
- Born: December 27, 1849 Beaufort, South Carolina, United States
- Died: July 24, 1902 (aged 52) Selma, Alabama, United States
- Buried: Old Live Oak Cemetery
- Denomination: Anglican
- Parents: John G. Barnwell & Emma Elliott
- Spouse: Margaret Coutrier Blair (m. 1879)
- Children: 7

Robert Woodward Barnwell (December 27, 1849 – July 24, 1902) was the third bishop of the Diocese of Alabama in The Episcopal Church, serving only two years.

== Early life and education ==
Barnwell was born on December 27, 1849, in Beaufort, South Carolina, son of Major John Gibbes Barnwell II (1816-1905) and Emma Elliott (1817-1894). He was educated at Trinity College in Connecticut and graduated in 1871. While there, he was a member of the Fraternity of Delta Psi (St. Anthony Hall). He then studied at the General Theological Seminary and graduated in 1873. In 1900 he received an honorary D.D. from the University of the South and LL.D. from the University of Alabama.

== Ordained ministry ==
Barnwell was ordained deacon in 1873 by Bishop John Williams and priest in 1875 by Bishop John W. Beckwith. He served in St George's Church in Griffin, Georgia, between 1873 and 1876. In 1876, he transferred to Demopolis, Alabama, as rector of Trinity Church, while in 1880, he became rector of St Paul's Church in Selma, Alabama.

== Episcopacy ==
On May 18, 1900, Barnwell was elected as the Coadjutor Bishop of Alabama. However, prior to his consecration, the diocesan bishop of Alabama Richard Hooker Wilmer died and hence Barnwell was instead consecrated as the third diocesan Bishop of Alabama on July 25, 1900, in St Paul's Church, Selma by the Bishop of Mississippi Hugh Miller Thompson. He died two years later on July 24, 1902, in Selma, Alabama.

== See also ==
- Historical list of bishops of the Episcopal Church in the United States of America
