= Robert O. Miller =

American Episcopalian bishop (1935–2009)

The Right Reverend Robert Oran Miller D.D.
- Bishop of Alabama
- Church: Episcopal Church
- Diocese: Alabama
- Elected: June 25, 1988
- In office: 1988–1998
- Predecessor: Bill Stough
- Successor: Henry N. Parsley Jr.
- Previous post: Suffragan Bishop of Alabama (1986-1988)

Orders
- Ordination: 1968
- Consecration: September 1, 1986 by Edmond L. Browning

Personal details
- Born: February 14, 1935 Wynnville, Alabama, United States
- Died: June 29, 2009 (aged 74) Birmingham, Alabama, United States
- Denomination: Anglican (prev. Methodist)
- Spouse: Margaret Fisher
- Children: 2

Robert Oran Miller (February 14, 1935 – June 29, 2009) was an American bishop of the Episcopal Diocese of Alabama from 1988 to 1998.

== Early life and education ==
Miller was born in Wynnville, Alabama, on February 14, 1935, the son of a Methodist minister. He studied at the Birmingham-Southern College and graduated with a degree in Psychology in 1960. He then studied at the Candler School of Theology of Emory University and graduated with a Bachelor of Divinity in 1963. Between 1967 and 1968 he enrolled in the Anglican studies program at the School of Theology of Sewanee: The University of the South, then a prerequisite for ministers coming into the Episcopal Church from other denominations (he was originally in the Methodist ministry). He was awarded an honorary Doctor of Divinity from the same university in 1988.

== Ordained ministry ==
Miller was ordained a deacon in 1962 and elder in 1963 in what was then the Methodist Church (now United Methodist Church). He then served as associate minister of First Methodist Church in Anniston, Alabama, from 1963 to 1965, and then as Director of the Wesley Foundation at the Jacksonville State University from 1965 until 1970.

After studies at the University of the South, he joined the Episcopal Church and was ordained deacon and priest in 1968. He then served as rector of St. Wilfred's Church in Marion, Alabama, and priest-in-charge of Holy Cross Church in Carlowville, Alabama, from 1968 to 1970. He moved to Montgomery, Alabama, in 1970 to become curate of the Church of Holy Comforter, succeeding as rector in 1971. In 1984 he became rector of the Church of St. Francis of Assisi in Pelham, Alabama, near Birmingham.

== Bishop ==
Miller was elected Suffragan Bishop of Alabama on May 31, 1986. He was consecrated on September 1, 1986, at the Cathedral Church of the Advent, by Presiding Bishop Edmond L. Browning. He was then elected as the ninth Bishop of Alabama on June 25, 1988, and succeeded as diocesan bishop in October 1988, after the resignation of Bishop Stough. He retained the post until his retirement on December 31, 1998.

Miller inherited from Stough a strong and vibrant Diocesan infrastructure, along with strong parishes (all congregations in the Alabama diocese are self-supporting, with no "missions" or "vicars" like elsewhere in the Episcopal Church), things that would keep the Diocese of Alabama in good stead as the rest of the Episcopal denomination faced increasingly vicious internecine conflict in the 1990s over matters such as sexual ethics and theology, particularly biblical interpretation. Despite the state's strongly conservative cultural and social composition, the Diocese had a reputation in Alabama religious circles for being a bastion of tolerance, civility, and concern for minorities, something aided by Miller's gentle but strong pastoral disposition as a leader. While the denomination was elsewhere encountering a decided decline in numbers and influence, Alabama kept growing during Miller's episcopate, something that continued well into the 2000s. The diocese was also noted for avoiding significant involvement in the Anglican realignment movement, which some other Southern dioceses participated strongly in, except for a few disaffected parishioners.
