= Clara Weaver Parrish =

American painter (1861–1925)

- Born: Clara Minter Weaver; March 16, 1861; Sardis, Alabama, U.S.
- Died: November 11, 1925 (aged 64); New York City, New York, U.S.
- Resting place: Old Live Oak Cemetery, Selma, Alabama
- Known for: Painting, printmaking, illustration, mosaics, murals, stained glass
- Movement: Art Nouveau, Tonalism
- Spouse: William Peck Parrish

Clara Minter Parrish (née Weaver; March 16, 1861 – November 11, 1925) was an American artist from Alabama. Although she produced a large amount of work in a wide array of media, she is best known for her paintings and stained glass window designs. She was inducted into the Alabama Women's Hall of Fame in 1983.

== Early life ==
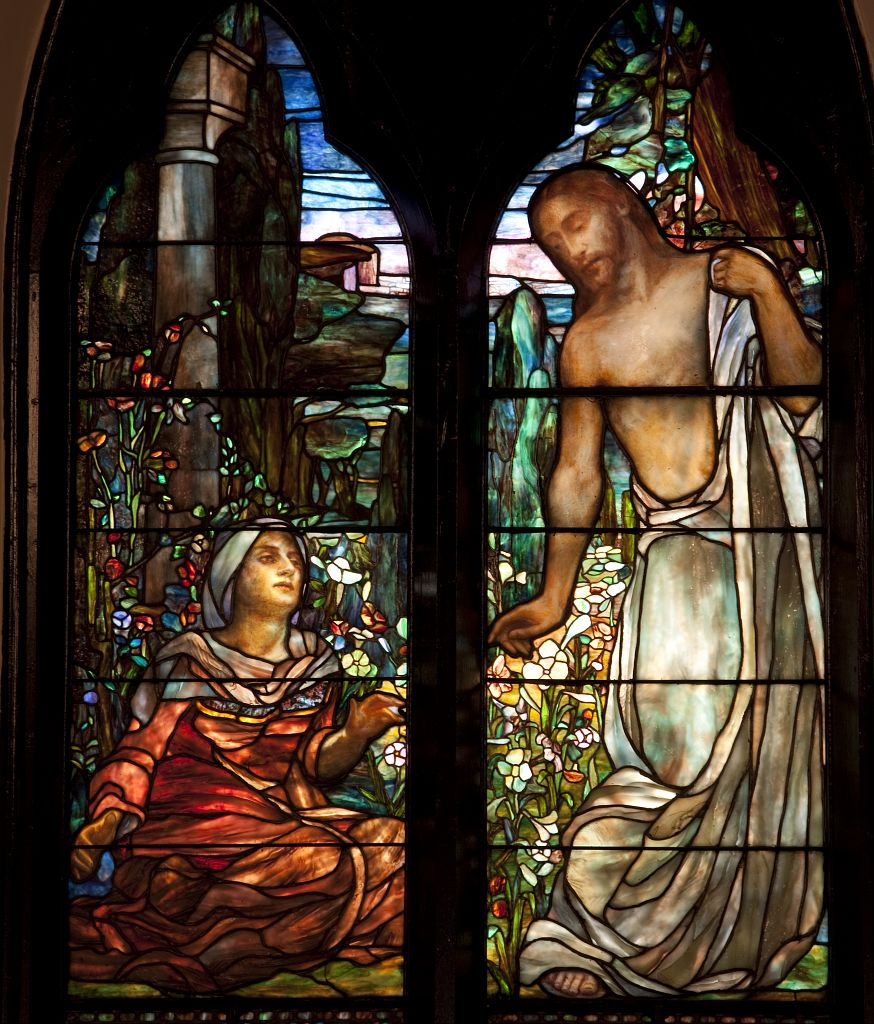
Tiffany windows designed by Parrish circa 1890s for St. Paul's Episcopal Church in Selma.

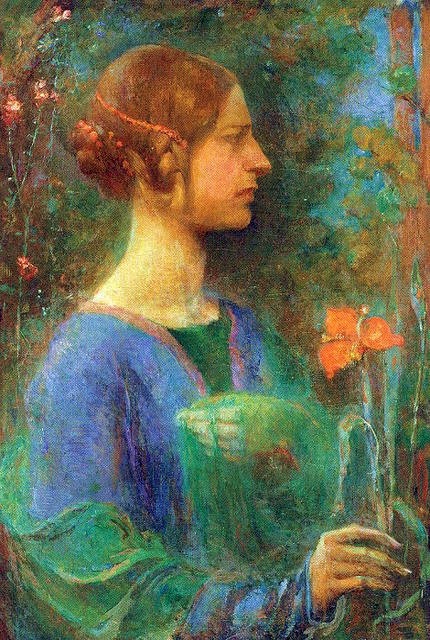
The Red Lily, oil on canvas by Parrish circa 1914.

Clara Minter Weaver was born at the Minter family's Dallas County plantation, Emerald Place, near Sardis (southeast of Selma), on March 16, 1861. Her parents were William M. Weaver and Lucia Frances Minter, both from locally prominent families. Her paternal grandparents were Phillip J. Weaver and Ann P. Gardner. Her maternal grandparents were William T. Minter and Susan A. Bell.

William and Lucia Weaver cultivated their daughter's talent in the arts. She excelled in her artistic endeavors and was sent in the early 1880s to study at the Art Students League of New York. She was taught by the likes of William Merritt Chase, Kenyon Cox, Henry Siddons Mowbray, and Julian Alden Weir.

During this time she frequently returned to Selma, where she met her future husband, William Peck Parrish, a native of nearby Greensboro. They were married in October 1889 in Selma.

== Marriage and career ==
The Parrish couple relocated to New York in 1890, where Clara continued her artistic pursuits and William worked as a stockbroker in the New York Stock Exchange. She was exhibiting her paintings widely within a few years, including the World's Columbian Exposition in Chicago in 1893. During the 1890s, she also began promoting women artists while serving as an officer in the Woman's Art Club of New York.

The couple eventually had two daughters, both of whom died very young. Following the death of one of these children she developed an interest in mosaic, mural, and stained glass design.

She became a designer for Louis Comfort Tiffany at his Tiffany Glass & Decorating Company (later renamed Tiffany Studios) and worked on many of his commissions, including the windows for New York's St. Michael's Church in 1895.

She also designed a number of windows for Alabama churches during this period, including the Church of the Holy Cross in Uniontown, Christ Episcopal Church, Tuscaloosa, Alabama, and, in Selma, both First Baptist Church and St. Paul's Episcopal Church.

She illustrated a book of African American folklore by Martha Sawyer Gielow in 1898. Gielow, another Alabama native, was known for her slave narratives and children's stories.

Parrish's husband died from a heart attack while on a train from Washington, D.C., to their home in New York on April 29, 1901. This left her a widow at age forty. She continued her work, exhibiting at the Exposition Universelle in Paris during 1900. Her painting, in the Art Nouveau style, was influenced by her work in stained glass.

== Later life and death ==
Although Parrish had previously traveled back and forth between New York and France often, she relocated for several years beginning in 1910. She exhibited at the Salon in Paris and Royal Academy in London. While there she studied at the Académie Colarossi and visited cathedrals to study medieval stained glass. She traveled extensively in France and Italy. For many years she maintained a studio in Paris at No. 83 Boulevard du Montparnasse. She returned to New York in 1914.

She died on November 11, 1925, at her New York City home. She was interred beside her husband in the Weaver plot at Old Live Oak Cemetery in Selma, Alabama.

Her will established the Weaver-Parrish Memorial Trust, which provides aid to the needy of Selma and Dallas County to the present day. It also provides a college scholarship every other year to a graduate of Selma High School.
