= William G. McDowell =

American prelate

The Right Reverend William George McDowell D.D.
- Bishop of Alabama
- Church: Episcopal Church
- Diocese: Alabama
- In office: 1928–1938
- Predecessor: Charles Minnigerode Beckwith
- Successor: Charles Carpenter
- Previous post: Coadjutor Bishop of Alabama (1922-1928)

Orders
- Ordination: 1909 by Alfred Magill Randolph
- Consecration: October 20, 1922 by Thomas F. Gailor

Personal details
- Born: August 2, 1882 Lexington, Virginia, United States
- Died: March 20, 1938 (aged 55) Mobile, Alabama, United States
- Buried: Elmwood Cemetery (Birmingham, Alabama)
- Denomination: Anglican
- Parents: William George Mcdowell & Ruth Conway Prichard
- Spouse: Mary Meade Phelps (m. May 25, 1915)
- Children: 7
- Education: Washington and Lee University

William George McDowell Jr. (August 2, 1882 - March 20, 1938) was an American prelate who served as the fifth Bishop of Alabama from 1928 till his death in 1938.

== Early life and education ==
McDowell was born on August 2, 1882, in Lexington, Virginia, the son of William George Mcdowell and Ruth Conway Prichard. He graduated with a Bachelor of Arts from Washington and Lee University in 1902 before embarking for studies at the Virginia Theological Seminary from where he earned his Bachelor of Divinity in 1909. The Virginia seminary awarded him a Doctor of Divinity in 1922, while the University of the South and Washington and Lee University, each awarded him another one in 1923 respectively.

== Ordained ministry ==
McDowell was ordained deacon by Bishop Beverley D. Tucker and priest by Bishop Alfred Magill Randolph in 1909. He then became rector Meherrin Parish, in Meherrin, Virginia, and in 1913 became rector of Emmanuel Church in Staunton, Virginia. From 1918 till 191 he served as a first lieutenant chaplain in the US Army during WWI. Later, in 1919, he served as a student pastor at the Alabama Polytechnic Institute (now Auburn University), where he remained till 1922.

== Bishop ==
In 1922, McDowell was elected Coadjutor Bishop of Alabama at a special convention at Carlowville, Alabama (Dallas County) and was consecrated on October 20, 1922, by the Bishop of Tennessee, Thomas F. Gailor. He then succeeded as Diocesan bishop upon the death of Charles Minnigerode Beckwith in 1928. He died on March 20, 1938, of pneumonia contracted during an episcopal visitation to the southern part of the Diocese.
