= Locust Grove (Lynchburg, Virginia) =

Historic house in Virginia, United States

- U.S. National Register of Historic Places
- Virginia Landmarks Register
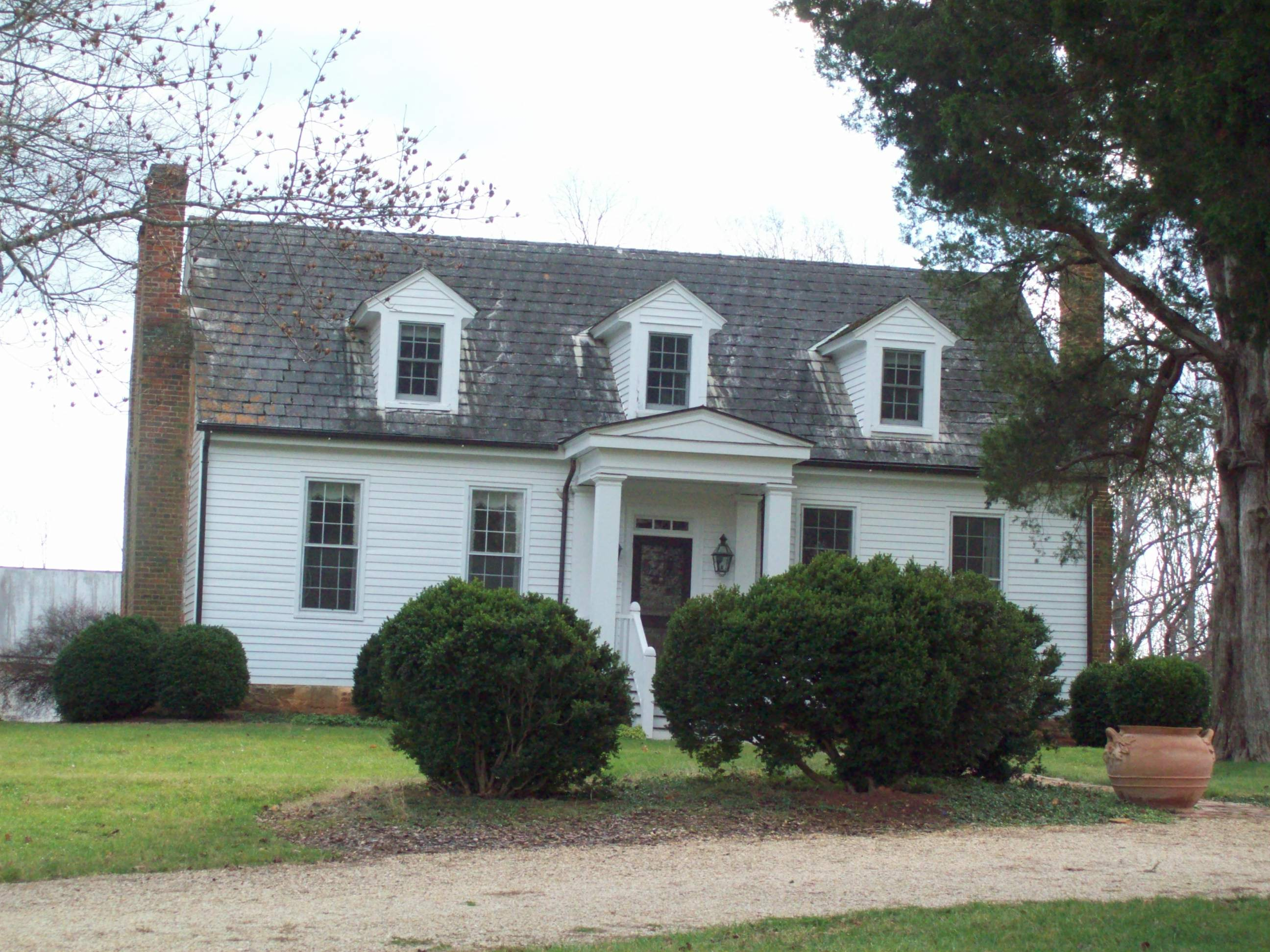
- Locust Grove, Lynchburg VA, November 2009

- Location within Virginia Location within the United States
- Location: Marvin Pl., Lynchburg, Virginia
- Coordinates: 37°26′26″N 79°14′59″W
- Area: 32 acres (13 ha)
- Built: 1810
- Architectural style: Federal
- NRHP reference No.: 92001704
- VLR No.: 118-0219

Significant dates
- Added to NRHP: December 17, 1992
- Designated VLR: June 19, 1991

Locust Grove is a historic home located on a 32-acre (13 ha) tract. at Lynchburg, Virginia. It is a five-bay, double-pile, central-passage-plan. 1 1/2-story, timberframe, four end chimney Federal-style house.

== History ==
Samuel Cobbs (who had represented nearby Amelia County in the House of Burgesses in 1747) in 1758 willed his 1,000-acre (400 ha) acre estate to his brothers Edmund and John. (John P. Cobbs and later John C. Cobbs would represent Nelson County in the Virginia House of Delegates, the latter possibly the son of Edmund Cobbs Jr. below). Edmund Cobbs in 1760 erected a house on the Bedford County property, and when he died in 1798, his widow received 260-acre (110 ha) acres and six sons shared about 960-acre (390 ha) acres. Tilghman Cobbs would first represent Bedford County in the state legislature in 1829 and again in 1839–1840.

Edmund Cobbs Jr. had acquired about 294-acre (119 ha) acres on Cheese Creek, about 5 miles from his father's land, and began the current house in 1810, before acquiring the 260-acre (110 ha) dower land in an auction after his mother's death in 1814. He enlarged the house significantly between 1825 and 1830 to its present central-passage plan, but used the adjoining land as collateral. He died there in 1856, after selling off much of the land in pieces, several about 1830 and deeding 260 acres in 1843 to his son John C. Cobbs. His declining land and slave ownership may reflect declining soil fertility due to common practices in growing tobacco, as well as his personal moral values. In 1820, the year his daughter Lucy married her cousin Rev. Nicholas Hamner Cobbs, Edmund Cobbs owned 25 enslaved people (including 11 children); he owned 12 slaves in 1830, seven enslaved people in 1840 and nine (including four small children) in 1850. His son and heir John Cabell Cobbs would own 7 slaves (four of them children) in 1860. Rev. Nicholas Hamner Cobbs taught school at the New London Academy in Bedford County for several years as well as became an Episcopal priest in 1825 and received 38 acres from his father in law in 1828. He founded several Episcopal congregations in Bedford County and nearby areas before accepting a position in Petersburg, and then became bishop of Alabama in 1844. John C. Cobbs had owned $6,400 in real estate and $5,450 in personal property (including slaves) in 1860; in 1870, the real estate was valued at $1,820 and personal property at $769. His wife became insane when their children ranged in age from six to twenty years old; he would declare bankruptcy four years after the Panic of 1873 and resulting depression. However, the family did not lose the real estate until World War I, possibly because neighbors were in similarly difficult circumstances and fellow Episcopalian and lawyer Martin Parks Burks had set up a trust and was commissioner of accounts.

== Locust Hill ==
The house was extensively renovated in 1932, after its purchase by John Capron, a colonial history enthusiast who renamed it "Locust Hill". The renovations reflected his preferred "Williamsburg style", now considered more formal than authentic for the Piedmont locale. He mentioned it as "from an earlier era" in a book he published for the Lynchburg sesquicentennial in 1936. A garage, barn, guest house, and tenant house were also erected during the Capron era.

It was listed on the National Register of Historic Places in 1992.
