= Kee Sloan =

American prelate (born 1955)

The Right Reverend John McKee Sloan M.Div.
- Bishop of Alabama
- Church: Episcopal Church
- Diocese: Alabama
- Elected: July 16, 2011
- In office: 2012–2021
- Predecessor: Henry N. Parsley, Jr.
- Successor: Glenda S. Curry
- Previous post: Suffragan Bishop of Alabama (2008-2012)

Orders
- Ordination: 1982
- Consecration: January 12, 2008 by Katharine Jefferts Schori

Personal details
- Born: November 13, 1955 (age 70) Vicksburg, Mississippi, United States
- Denomination: Episcopalian
- Spouse: Tina Brown
- Children: 2

John McKee "Kee" Sloan (born November 13, 1955) is an American prelate who served most recently as the eleventh Bishop of Alabama.

== Biography ==
A native of Vicksburg, Mississippi, Sloan received his Bachelor of Science degree in Sociology from Mississippi State University in 1976 and his Master of Divinity degree from the School of Theology at the University of the South in Sewanee, Tennessee, in 1981.

Before being elected Alabama’s Bishop Suffragan in 2008, Sloan served as Curate for Holy Cross in Olive Branch and St. Timothy’s in Horn Lake, Mississippi (1981–83; both in the Memphis, Tennessee metropolitan area); as Vicar of the Church of the Incarnation in West Point, Mississippi (1983–86); as Rector of All Saints’ Episcopal Church in Grenada, Mississippi (1986–90); as Chaplain at the University of Mississippi and Assistant Rector at St. Peter’s Episcopal Church in Oxford, Mississippi (1990–93); and as Rector of St. Thomas’ Episcopal Church in Huntsville, Alabama (1993–2007). In 2011, Sloan was elected as the 11th Diocesan Bishop of the Diocese of Alabama, being invested in January, 2012.

In 1987, Sloan married the former Tina Brown of Leland, Mississippi; they met at a Special Session, a summer camp for people with mental and physical disabilities at Camp Bratton-Green, the Episcopal church camp in the Mississippi diocese. In 1989 their son McKee was born, and in 1994 their daughter Mary Nell was born.

Sloan has participated in many mission trips to Honduras. Within the diocese, Sloan has previously served as director of Special Session, housed at the diocese's Camp McDowell, after founding the program in the Diocese of Alabama.

Kee Sloan is the author of two semi-autobiographical books, Jabbok and its sequel Beulah.

Sloan retired from the Alabama diocese in January 2021, his successor, Glenda S. Curry, having been elected and consecrated during 2020.

== See also ==
- List of Episcopal bishops of the United States
- Historical list of the Episcopal bishops of the United States
