= George M. Murray (bishop) =

American Episcopal bishop

The Right Reverend George Mosley Murray D.D., L.H.D., LL.D.
- Bishop of the Central Gulf Coast
- Church: Episcopal Church
- Diocese: Central Gulf Coast
- Elected: 1970
- In office: 1971–1981
- Successor: Charles F. Duvall
- Previous posts: Suffragan Bishop of Alabama (1953-1959); Coadjutor Bishop of Alabama (1959-1968); Bishop of Alabama (1968-1970)

Orders
- Ordination: November 1948 by Charles Carpenter
- Consecration: June 24, 1953 by Charles Carpenter

Personal details
- Born: 12 April 1919 Baltimore, Maryland
- Died: 14 July 2006 (aged 87) Fairhope, Alabama
- Denomination: Anglican
- Parents: Gerard Archibald Murray & Emma Winston Eareckson
- Spouse: Elizabeth Garthwaite Malcolm (m. 1944); Margaret MacQueen (m. 1983)
- Children: George Malcolm Murray; William Gerard Murray; Sarah Duncan Murray
- Education: University of Alabama, Virginia Theological Seminary

George Mosley Murray (April 12, 1919 – July 14, 2006) was a bishop of the Episcopal Church in the United States. He was born 1919 in Baltimore, Maryland. His mother, Emma Winston Eareckson, was a registered nurse and head of pediatric nursing in the United States Steel Corporation's villages. His father, Gerald Murray, was an engineer at the United States Steel Corporation. Murray had a brother named Gerard. As a small child, George's parents moved him to Bessemer, Alabama, his father's new place of employment. Later, George attended the University of Alabama. He died at the age of 87 on July 14, 2006, in Fairhope, Alabama.

== Education ==
George Mosley Murray graduated from the University of Alabama in 1940 with a B.S. degree in business administration. He previously graduated from Hueytown High School. He worked for the General Electric company in Charlotte, North Carolina, until 1942 when he joined the Navy. George served in the military for 4 years of service. He enlisted in the Navy when World War II started. Murray served as an instructor in the Gunnery School for a year before volunteering for seventeen months on the submarine Pintado. He was discharged in 1946. George's term in the Navy only confirmed his desire to become a minister. He wanted to work for the Episcopal Church. So after his discharge in 1946, Murray decided that he wanted to attend the Virginia Theological Seminary in which graduated cum laude with a Bachelor of Divinity degree in 1948.

== Work ==
After his graduation, he was ordained to the diaconate by Bishop Carpenter of Alabama on April 5, 1948, at Trinity Church, Bessemer, Alabama, and priest a few months later at Christ Church, Tuscaloosa, Alabama. Shortly after, he accepted his first position in the church as the Episcopal student chaplain at the University of Alabama. Five years later, at the age of thirty-four, he was elected the Suffragan bishop of the Alabama Diocese, and after his consecration at the Church of the Advent in Birmingham, became assistant to Bishop Charles Colcock Jones Carpenter. In 1959, his election was virtually assured when he was made Bishop Coadjutor and thus was slated to succeed Bishop Carpenter. And in 1969, he became the Ordinary of the Diocese.

But he remained in the post only two years. When the Diocese of the Central Gulf Coast was created from the southern one-third of Alabama and the Florida panhandle, he accepted the call to become its Bishop and left for Mobile, the new see city. His term in Alabama ended on December 31, 1970, and his term in Central Gulf Coast commenced on January 1, 1971. Under his leadership, the new diocese prospered; by the end of 1971, it numbered fifty-six congregations and more than 12,000 communicants.

== Awards ==
Bishop Murray received a number of notable honors since he was elevated to the episcopate. In 1953, the year he was made Suffragan Bishop, the University of Alabama gave him its Algernon Sydney Sullivan Award, and the College of Preachers at Washington Cathedral invited him to participate in a special six-week refresher course as a Fellow of the College. A year later, he was made an honorary Doctor of Divinity by the University of the South and his alma mater, Virginia Theological Seminary. In 1956, he was given an honorary Doctor of Laws degree by the University of Alabama. And in 1968, St. Bernard College in Cullman, Alabama, made him an honorary Doctor of Humane Letters.

== Personal life ==
Bishop Murray was married to Margaret Macqueen. They resided in Fairhope, Alabama. Murray had three children with his first wife, Elizabeth Malcolm Murray. Their names are George Malcolm Murray, William Gerard Murray, and Sarah Duncan Murray. He also has three grandchildren: Sean Douglas Murray, Erin Elizabeth Murray, and Andrew Stuart Murray.

== Legacy ==
George M. Murray was the youngest of the eight Alabama clergymen who wrote "A Call For Unity".

During the Civil Rights Movement Murray and his first wife, Elizabeth Malcolm Murray, decided that they both wanted to be active in the calling for greater equality and human rights. They did, however, get a lot of criticism from all sides. They were criticized for being too involved or not involved enough. While serving as Bishop Coadjutor, Murray was one of eight Birmingham clergymen who co-authored an April 12, 1963, open letter on racial tensions titled "A Call for Unity". This letter was the impetus for Reverend Martin Luther King to write in his famous "Letter from Birmingham Jail".
