= Nicholas H. Cobbs =

American minister and evangelist

The Right Reverend Nicholas Hamner Cobbs D.D., S.T.D.
- Bishop of Alabama
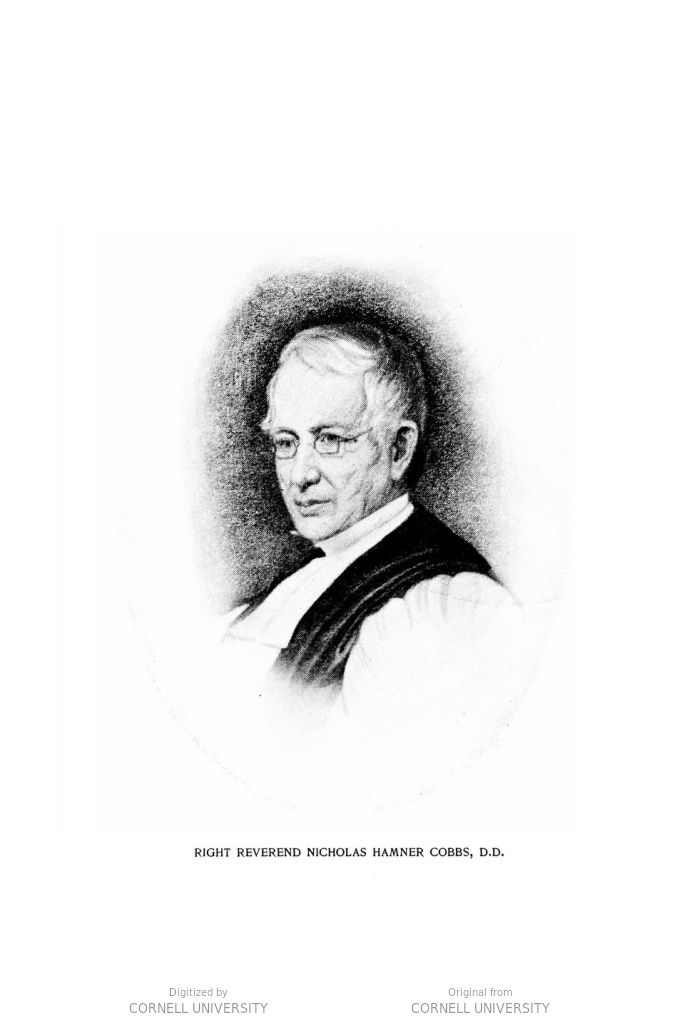
- Church: Episcopal Church
- Diocese: Alabama
- Elected: May 1844
- In office: 1844–1861
- Successor: Richard Hooker Wilmer

Orders
- Ordination: May 23, 1825 by Richard Channing Moore
- Consecration: October 20, 1844 by Philander Chase

Personal details
- Born: February 5, 1796 Bedford County, Virginia, United States
- Died: January 11, 1861 (aged 64) Montgomery, Alabama, United States
- Denomination: Anglican (prev. Presbyterian)
- Parents: John Lewis Cobbs and Susannah Hamner Cobbs
- Spouse: Lucy Henry Laudonia Cobbs (m. 1821)
- Children: 10

Nicholas Hamner Cobbs (February 5, 1796 – January 11, 1861) was a minister and evangelist of the Episcopal church who served as the first bishop of Alabama from 1844 to 1861.

== Early and family life ==
Nicholas Cobbs was born on February 5, 1796, in Bedford County, Virginia, to the former Susanna Hamner and her planter husband, John Lewis Cobbs. Although his father was not religious, his mother Susanna was a devout Episcopalian. She carried the boy 50 miles on horseback to be baptised at her childhood home in Albemarle County.

His paternal grandfather Edmund Cobbs was likewise a planter. He had married Sarah Lewis of Albemarle County and raised a large family. His immigrant ancestor Ambrose Cobbs had come to the Chesapeake Bay colony from England and patented lands in Tidewater York County in 1639.

Nicholas Cobbs received a private education suitable to his class. He taught school at the New London Academy at the former Bedford County seat of New London, Virginia.

He married his cousin Lucy Cobbs of Locust Grove plantation in Lynchburg, Virginia. They raised a large family.

== Ecclesiastic career ==
On May 23, 1824, in Staunton, Virginia, Virginia bishop Richard Channing Moore both confirmed Cobbs as an Episcopalian and ordained him as a deacon on the same day. The young missionary taught school during the week, then on weekends traveled by horse drawn wagon with a small choir to various Episcopalian homes in the Piedmont, Shenandoah Valley and Blue Ridge mountain region between Bristol and Lynchburg.

A year later, on May 23, 1825, Bishop Moore ordained Cobbs as priest at Monumental Church in Richmond. Rev. Cobbs re-established or became rector of two parishes in his home of Bedford County: Trinity Church and St. Stephen's, and several others in the region, including St. John's in Roanoke. In 1837, Rev. Cobbs became the Episcopal chaplain at the University of Virginia in Charlottesville in Albemarle County. He continued teaching and evangelizing in the region.

In 1839 Rev. Cobbs accepted a position slightly eastward at St. Paul's Church in Petersburg, Virginia. He also attended the General Conventions of the Episcopal Church as one of the Virginia delegates from 1828 until 1841. His sermon, "The Doubting Christian Encouraged", was reprinted several times.

In 1843, Cobbs moved westward and accepted a position as rector of St. Paul's church (later the Episcopal cathedral) in Cincinnati, Ohio. The city had become a major gateway for travel on the Ohio River and settlement of both the Midwest (which did not allow slavery pursuant to the Northwest Ordinance and subsequent state constitutions, but which adopted various legalisms to allow visiting slaveholders to continue to own enslaved individuals) and the non-seaboard South (from Kentucky across the Ohio River and further south into Tennessee, Mississippi, Alabama and Louisiana).

Cobbs owned enslaved people, as did his relatives who stayed in Virginia. In the 1830 U.S. Federal Census, Rev. Cobbs had owned five enslaved individuals: two males and two females of between 10 and 23 years old, and a woman of between 24 and 34 years old. Ten years later, in the 1840 U.S. Federal Census, Rev. Cobbs' household of 13 included four enslaved persons: a man of between 35 and 45 years old, and three women (1 in each of the 10–24 years old, 24 to 35 year old, and 35 to 45 year old categories).

He probably was the N. Cobbs who owned seven enslaved individuals in Tuscaloosa, Alabama in the 1850 federal census, since his, his wife's and children's names were spelled out in the corresponding census. In the 1860 federal census, Rev. Cobbs owned two enslaved 20 and 25-year-old Black women, a 45-year-old Black man, and a 14-year- old boy.

In 1844, Rev. Cobbs was elected the first bishop of the newly formed Episcopal Diocese of Alabama. After accepting the position, he was consecrated in Christ Church, Philadelphia, on October 20, 1844. Cobbs opposed Alabama's secession from the Union upon the election of Abraham Lincoln as President.

== Death and legacy ==
Cobbs died in Montgomery, Alabama, on January 11, 1861, the day of his state's secession from the Union on the eve of the American Civil War. The Bishop Cobbs Home for Orphans in Montgomery was named for him.
