= Charles Wheelock (architect) =

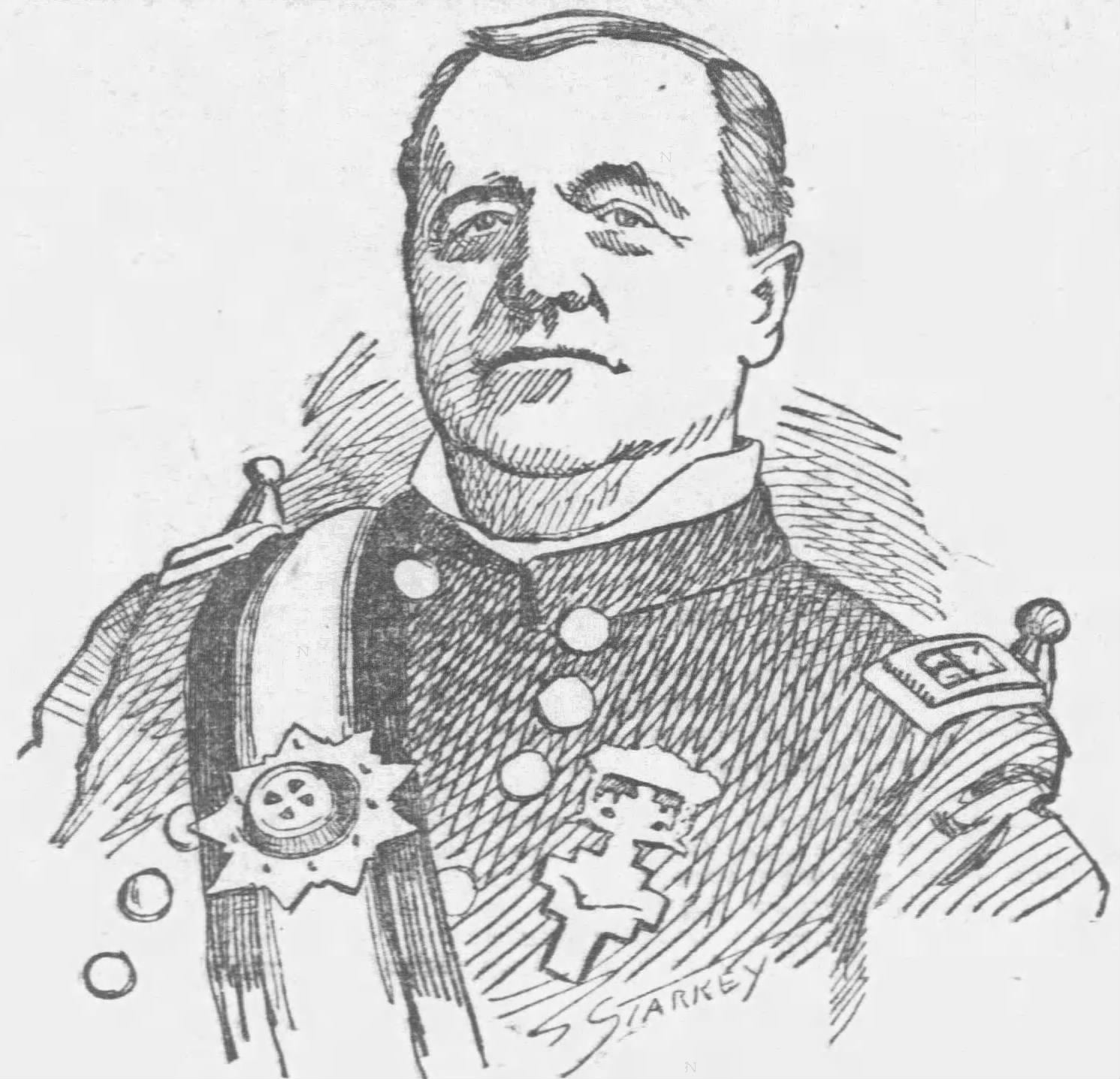
Charles Wheelock, circa 1900

Charles Wheelock (December 12, 1833 – September 24, 1910) was an architect in Birmingham, Alabama. His son Hary Burt Wheelock partnered with him to form Wheelock & Wheelock.

== Biography ==
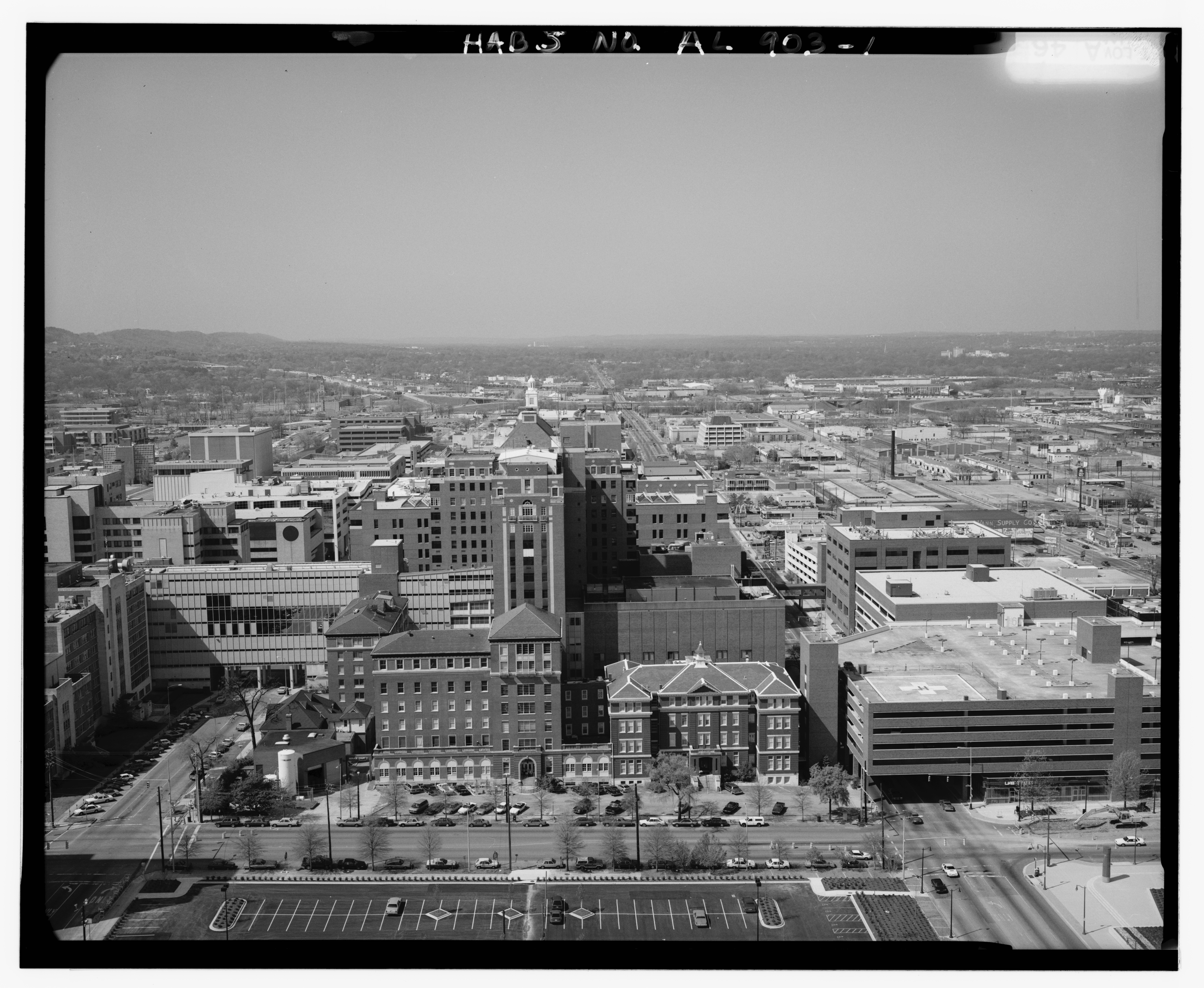
View of Birmingham including the five-story Hillman Hospital center right

He was born in New Hampshire and schooled in Oneida County, New York where his family moved when he was ten. He became a carpenter and then a contractor. He served in the 117th New York Infantry Regiment during the American Civil War rising to the rank of captain. After the war he moved around and worked in various cities before settling in Birmingham in 1881.

He married Eliza Manchester of Boonville, New York in 1853, and after they separated, he then married Anna Cassity in 1876. He remarried his first wife, Eliza, in February 1909.

He was a member of the masonic fraternity and Knights Templar.

His firm assisted H. Wolters of Louisville on the second Jefferson County Courthouse in Birmingham built in 1889. It was succeeded in 1929 by an art deco courthouse building, Jefferson County Courthouse (Birmingham, Alabama). S. Scott Joy (Samuel Scott Joy) was a partner at the firm (Wheelock, Joy and Wheelock).

Businessman George F. Wheelock was one of his sons.

Oliver Marble and M. W. Steele were the other architects in Birmingham in 1884. Marble went on to work in Chicago and Sandusky.

== Work ==
- Second Jefferson County Courthouse in Birmingham, Alabama
- Cathedral Church of the Advent (Wheelock, Joy, and Wheelock) (1893)
- Young & Vann Building (1893)
- Hillman Hospital (1903)

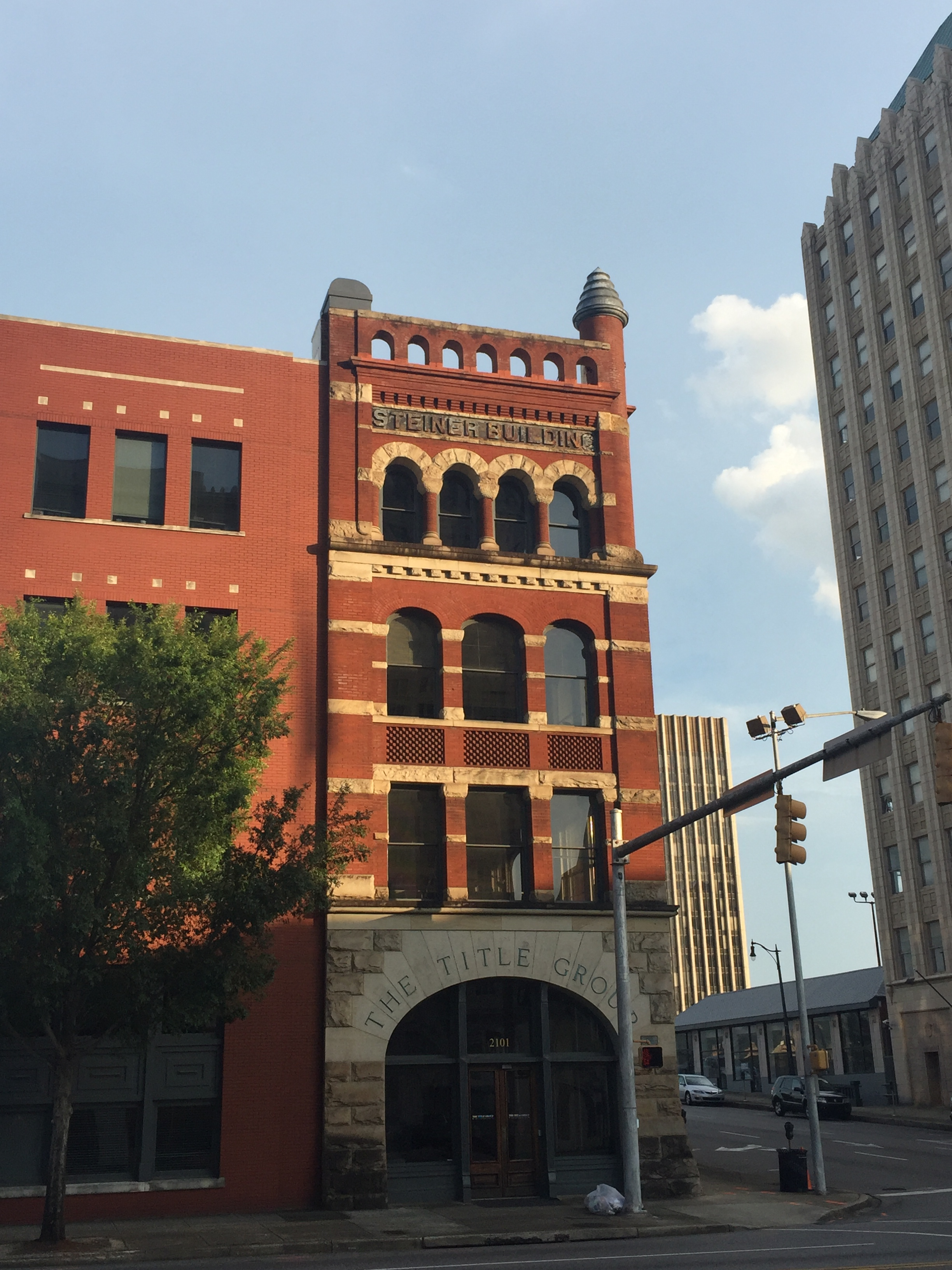
Steiner Bank Building in Birmingham

- Steiner Bank Building, NRHP listed
- Business block on First Avenue
- W. M. Burgin's music and art building on Fifth Avenue
- Bibb County Banking and Trust in Centreville, Alabama

=== Later works of the firm ===
- Forbes Piano Company at 1914 Fourth (1913), Harry B. Wheelock
- Hood-McPherson Furniture Building, now the Auburn University Provost Office (1914) (Harry Wheelock)
- Molton Apartments (1913)

== See also ==
- National Register of Historic Places listings in Birmingham, Alabama
