= Richard Hooker Wilmer =

American bishop

The Right Reverend Richard Hooker Wilmer
- Bishop of Alabama
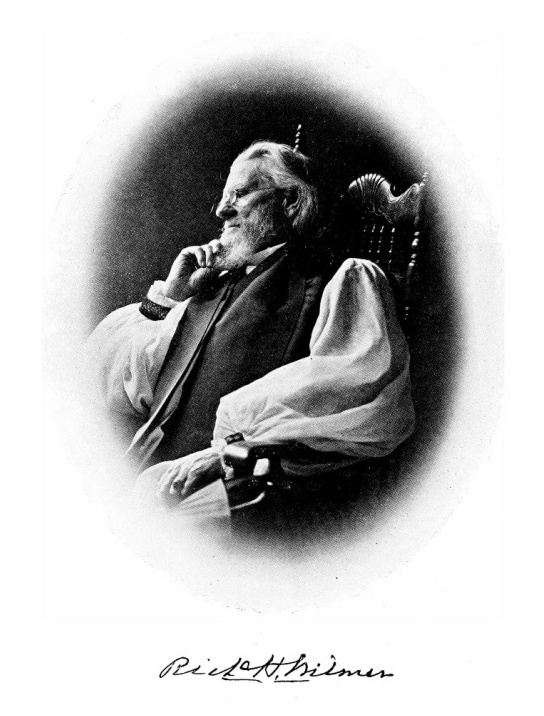
- Church: Episcopal Church
- Diocese: Alabama
- Elected: November 21, 1861
- In office: 1862–1900
- Predecessor: Nicholas H. Cobbs
- Successor: Robert Woodward Barnwell

Orders
- Ordination: April 19, 1840 by Richard Channing Moore
- Consecration: March 6, 1862 by William Meade

Personal details
- Born: March 15, 1816 Alexandria, Virginia, United States
- Died: June 14, 1900 (aged 84) Mobile, Alabama, United States
- Denomination: Anglican
- Parents: William Holland Wilmer & Marion Cox
- Education: Yale College

Richard Hooker Wilmer (March 15, 1816 – June 14, 1900) was the second Bishop of Alabama in the Episcopal Church. Richard Wilmer was the only bishop to be consecrated by the Episcopal Church in the Confederate States of America (PECCSA).

== Early and family life ==
He was born in Alexandria, Virginia, the son of the rector of Christ Church, William Holland Wilmer and his wife Marion Hannah Cox, who died in childbirth when Richard was six. His father, a prominent priest in Maryland as well as Virginia and from a family of priests, briefly served as the eleventh president of the College of William & Mary before his death in Williamsburg, Virginia, when Richard was only eleven. Raised in part by his stepmother (his eldest brother dying in Mississippi shortly after his father), Richard Wilmer worked as a teenager to support his family. He attended the Howard School.

He graduated from Yale College in 1836 and the Virginia Theological Seminary in 1839.

== Career ==
William Meade, Bishop of Virginia, ordained him as a deacon on March 31, 1839, and as a priest on April 19, 1840. He served parishes in Goochland and Fluvanna counties in Virginia, and then served as rector of St. James Church in Wilmington, North Carolina. Upon returning to Virginia, Wilmer served parishes in Clarke, Loudoun, Fauquier and Bedford counties. In 1858, he started a mission church in Henrico County which became Emmanuel Church at Brook Hill.

== Episcopate ==
Shortly after the outbreak of the American Civil War, Virginia and other states seceded from the Union, a move Wilmer supported, as eventually did Meade. Nicholas H. Cobbs, Bishop of Alabama, a slaveholder who did not support secession, died in Montgomery, Alabama on January 11, 1861, the day his state's legislature voted to secede from the Union. Weeks later, Meade and other bishops of dioceses now in Confederate states met in Montgomery and decided to form the Episcopal Church in the Confederate States of America (PECCSA). A diocesan convention in Alabama voted to join the PECCSA in August, and on November 21, 1861, another Alabama diocesan meeting elected Richard Wilmer his successor. Wilmer accordingly resigned his position at Emmanuel Church effective at the year's end. However, Bishops James Otey of Tennessee and Thomas Atkinson of North Carolina refused to participate in the necessary consecration ceremony before the PECCA held a convention and established its form of government. Since three bishops are needed for consecrations, the elderly and ill Meade traveled to Richmond for the consecration, and he, his assistant bishop John Johns, and bishop Stephen Elliott of Georgia, consecrated Wilmer as Bishop of Alabama on March 6, 1862, at St. Paul's Church. Meade died at a friend's house in Richmond shortly after that consecration.

After the Confederacy's defeat, Wilmer's consecration was ultimately accepted by a re-united Episcopal Church, although he remained an ardent Southern nationalist. He could not attend the first General Convention after the war because he was under house arrest for instructing his clergy to omit prayers for the President of the United States as a protest against military occupation. Nonetheless, the reunited church ratified his consecration.

Wilmer founded an order of deaconesses to care for Confederate widows and orphans, and by the time of his death in 1900, was the longest-serving Episcopal bishop. Although another Virginia priest, Henry Melville Jackson, assisted Wilmer in his last years, the diocese elected Robert Woodward Barnwell, a native of Selma, Alabama, as his successor.

== Legacy ==
Libraries which hold his papers include the Birmingham Public Library, University of North Carolina, and the Episcopal Diocese of Maryland.

The community of Wilmer, Alabama is named in his honor.

Episcopal Church (USA) titles
Preceded by Nicholas H. Cobbs	Bishop of Alabama; March 6, 1862–June 14, 1900	Succeeded by Robert Woodward Barnwell
