= Cape Fear Museum of History and Science =

- Location within North Carolina Cape Fear Museum of History and Science (the United States)
- Established: 1898
- Location: Wilmington, North Carolina
- Coordinates: 34.2360°N 77.9387°W
- Type: History & Science Museum
- Director: Kate Baillon
- Curator: Heather Yenco
- Website: https://www.capefearmuseum.com/

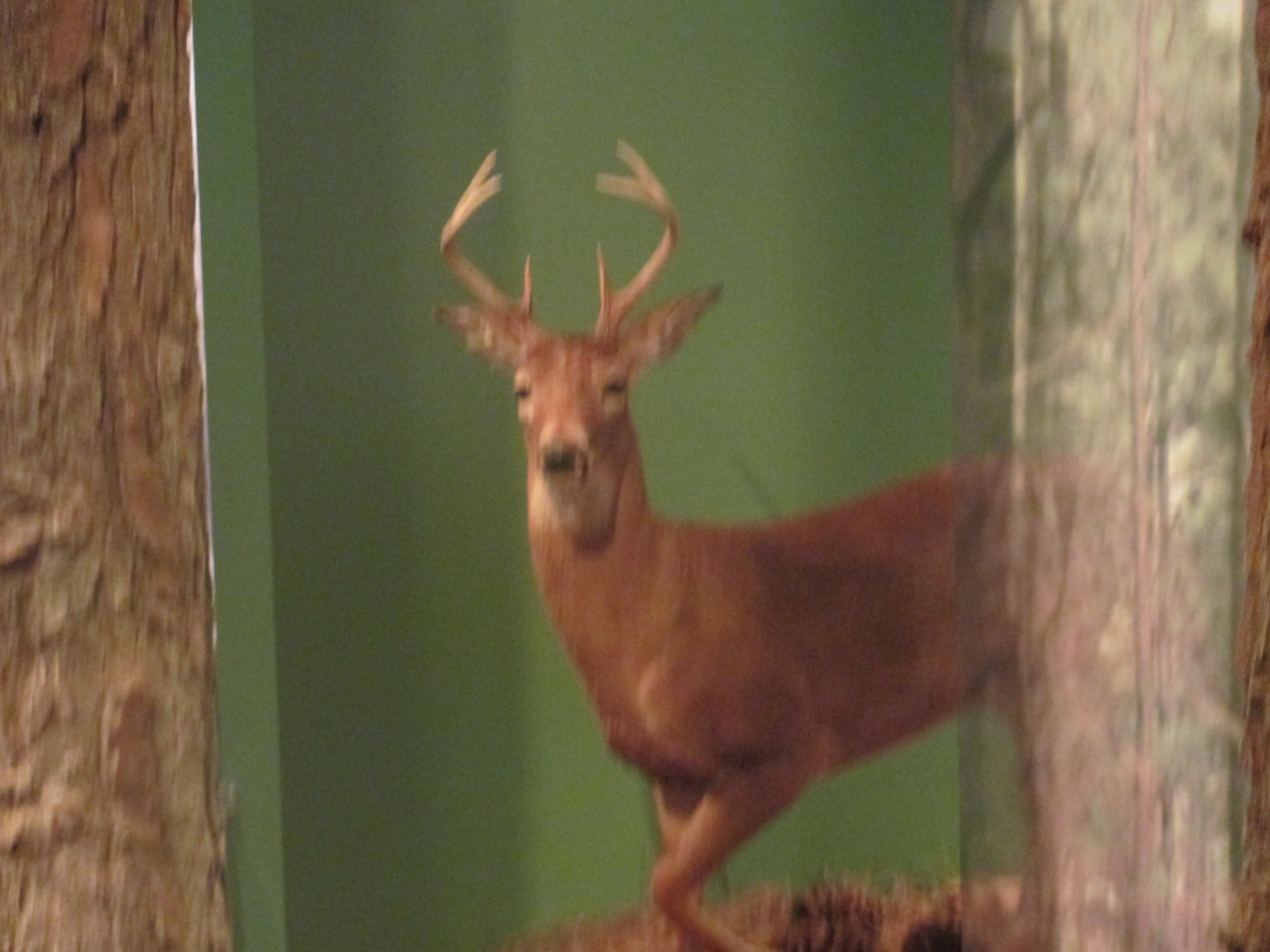
Deer exhibit at Cape Fear Museum.

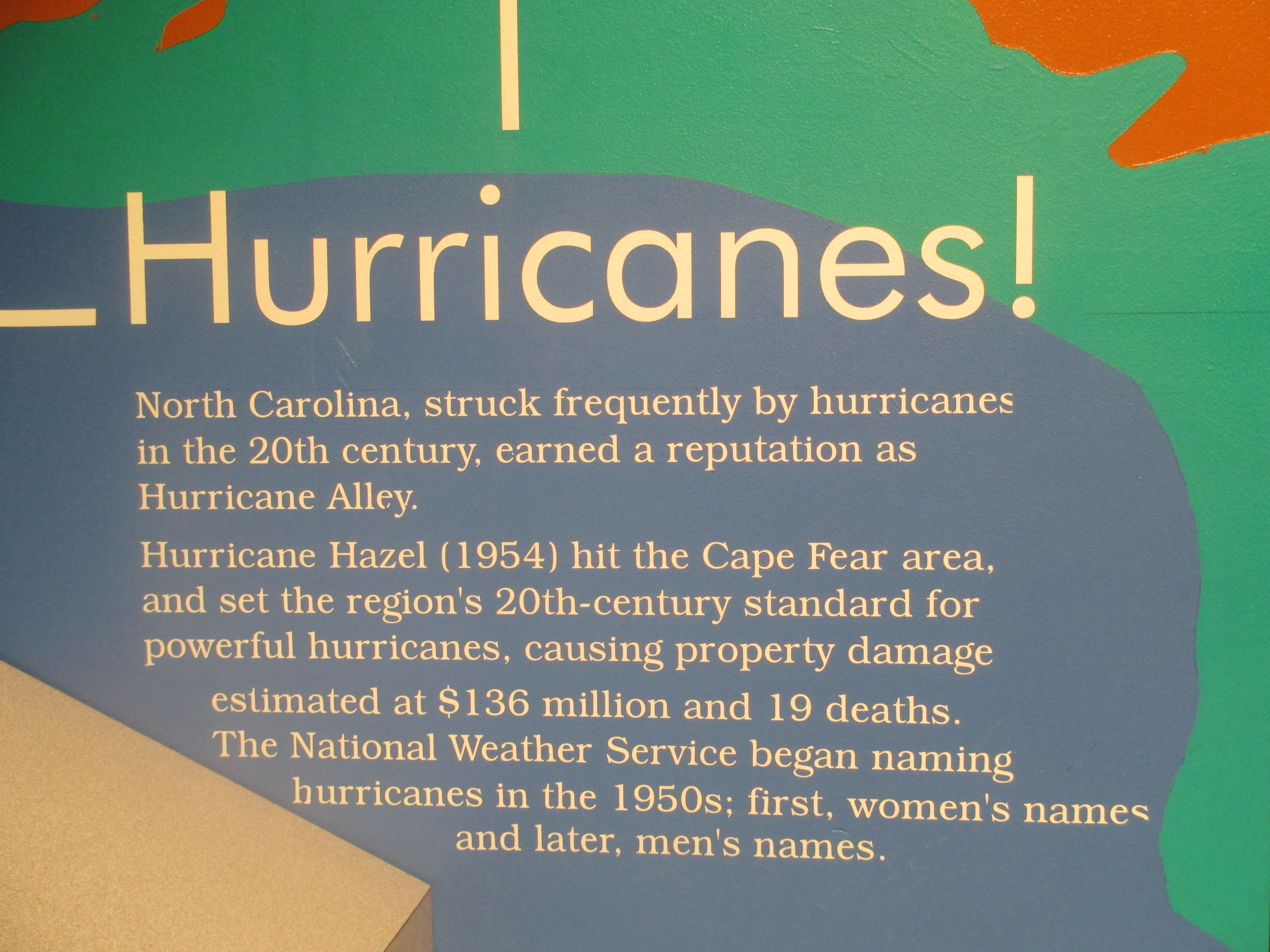
Hurricanes! exhibit.

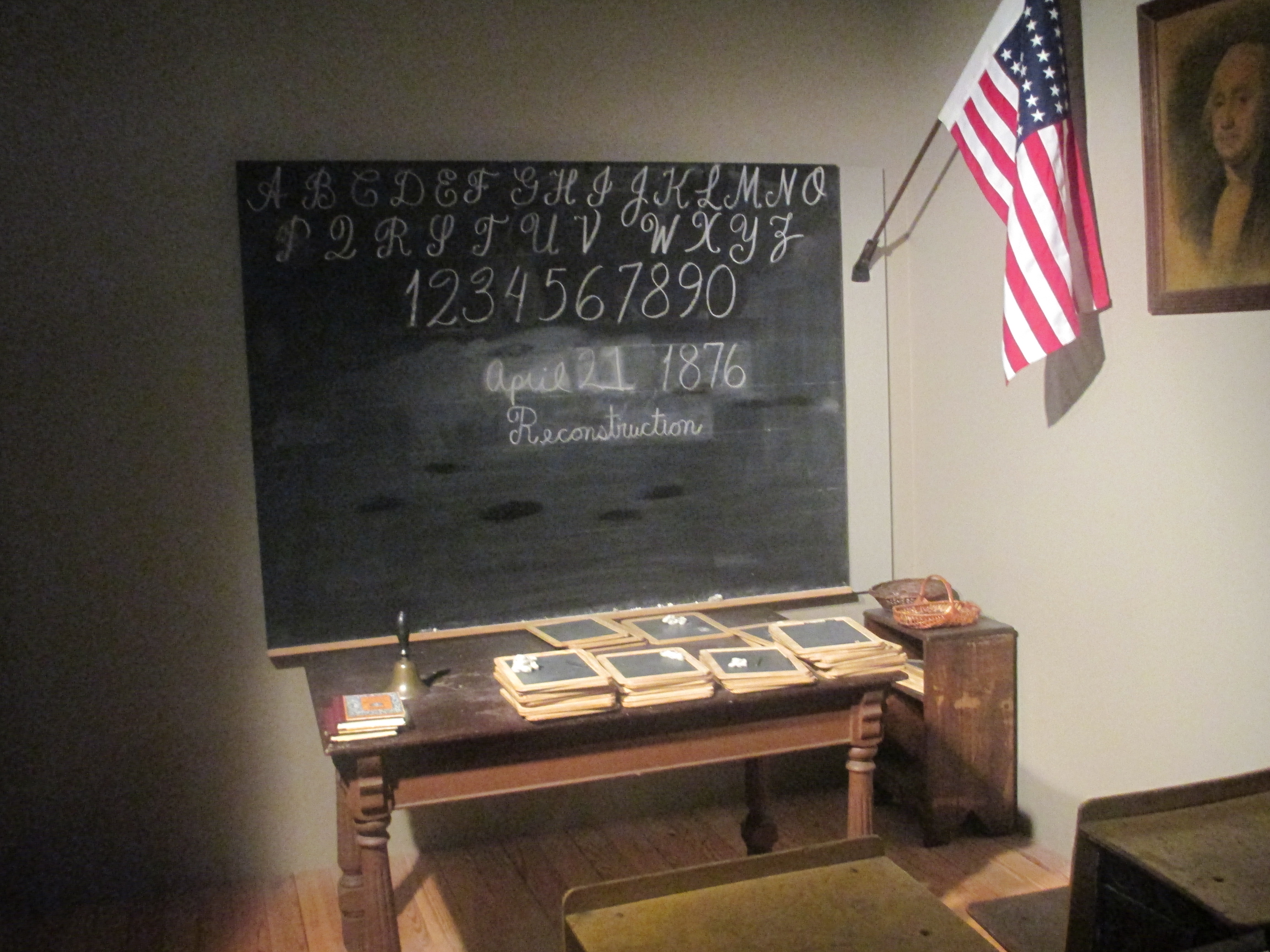
Restored 1876 classroom at Cape Fear Museum.

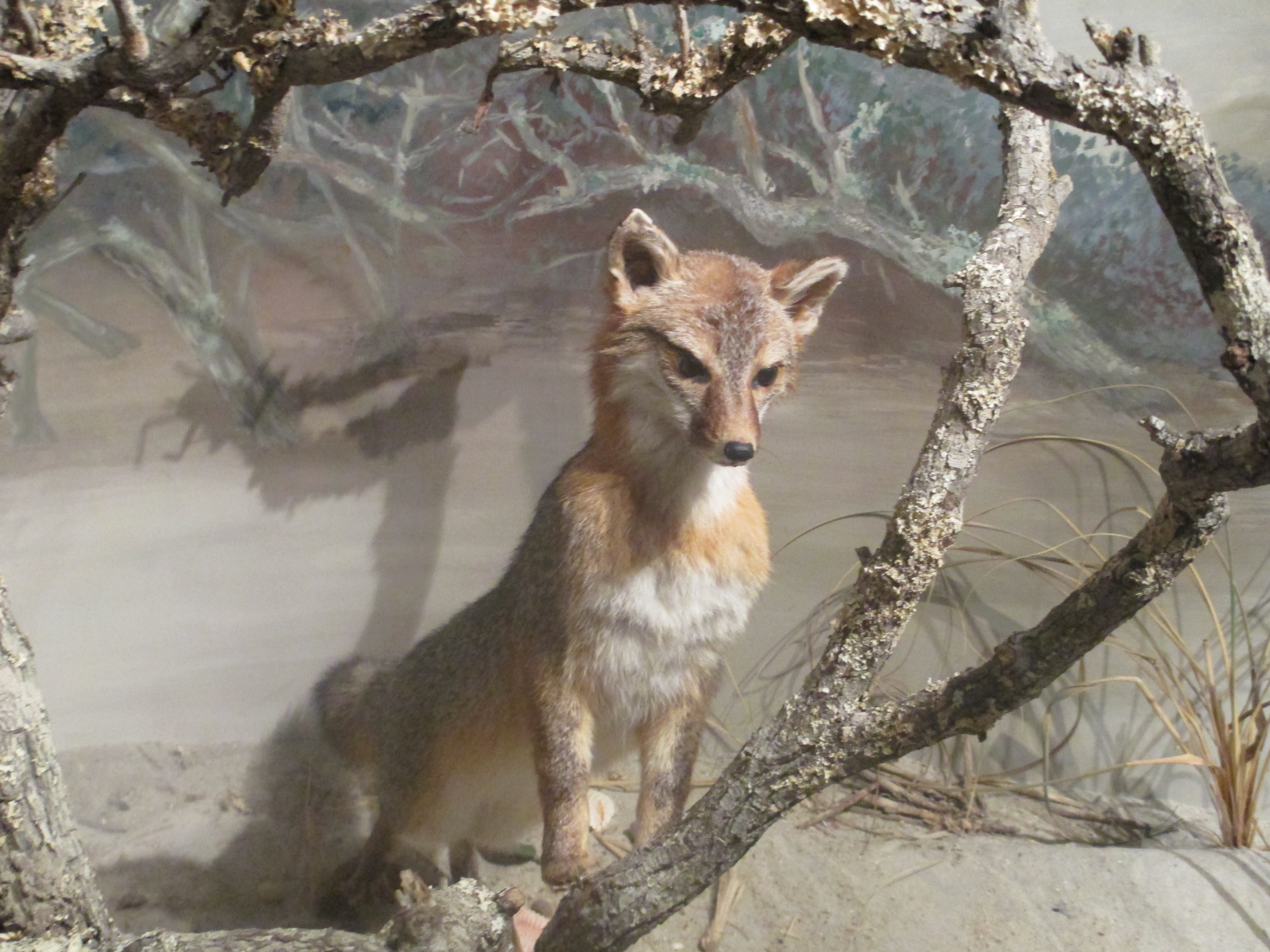
Fox exhibit at Cape Fear Museum.

Cape Fear Museum of History and Science is a museum in downtown Wilmington, North Carolina. Founded in 1898, it is the oldest history museum in the state.

== Museum scope ==
The Cape Fear Museum was founded in 1898 by the local chapter of the United Daughters of the Confederacy to preserve artifacts relating to the Civil War. Today, it is owned and operated by New Hanover County New Hanover, North Carolina. The museum moved to its current location in 1970. The museum's building is a combination of an historic structure—a 1930s Works Progress Administration armory—and a 1990s expansion.

The museum has a collection of more than fifty two thousand artifacts, the vast majority of which are in storage. The museum currently collects artifacts relating to the history, science, and cultures of the Lower Cape Fear, defined as a 50-mile radius around the city of Wilmington. In addition to New Hanover, the adjacent counties are Brunswick and Pender. The extended region encompasses portions of Columbus, Bladen, Sampson, Duplin, and Onslow counties.

=== Exhibits ===
==== Cape Fear Stories (first floor) ====
Cape Fear Stories is the Museum’s largest exhibition and delves into the rich history of the Lower Cape Fear region. The first floor spans covers prehistoric time through the Civil War, the 1898 massacre and coup, and into the early 20^{th} century.

==== Cape Fear Stories (second floor) ====
The second floor of Cape Fear Stories explores the 20^{th} century including the local economy and film industry, leisure and tourism, World Wars I and II, the environment, and more.

==== Port City Play ====
Port City Play is an imaginative play space for young children and their caregivers. It includes a two-story climber, hands-on interactive displays, performance theater, and more.

==== Science Matters ====
Science Matters is the Museum’s hands-on STEM gallery emphasizing how science helps us understand and change the world. Interactive experiences highlight local connections to our region.

==== Curious Nature ====
Curious Nature is an outdoor gallery on the Museum’s rooftop terrace. It highlights the beauty of our region, inspires curiosity, and features an interactive water play table.

==== Planetarium ====
The Museum features a 60-seat immersive digital dome theatre to feature star shows, science, and history programs.
