= Charles Carpenter (bishop) =

Episcopal bishop of Alabama

The Right Reverend Charles Carpenter
- Bishop of Alabama
- Church: Episcopal Church
- Diocese: Alabama
- Elected: April 27, 1938
- In office: 1938–1968
- Predecessor: William G. McDowell
- Successor: George Mosley Murray

Orders
- Ordination: June 24, 1926 by Frederick F. Reese
- Consecration: June 24, 1938 by Henry St. George Tucker

Personal details
- Born: September 2, 1899 Augusta, Georgia, United States
- Died: June 28, 1969 (aged 69) Birmingham, Alabama, United States
- Buried: Cathedral Church of the Advent (Birmingham, Alabama)
- Denomination: Anglican
- Parents: Samuel Carpenter, Ruth Berrien
- Spouse: Alexandra Morrison
- Children: 4

Charles Colcock Jones Carpenter (September 2, 1899 – June 28, 1969) was consecrated a bishop of the Alabama Episcopal Diocese on June 24, 1938, and served until 1968. He was one of the authors of the "A Call for Unity" letter published during Martin Luther King Jr.'s incarceration in a Birmingham, Alabama jail, asking him and his “outsider” followers to refrain from demonstrating in the streets of Birmingham.

== Personal ==
Carpenter was born in Augusta, Georgia, and often went by C. C. J. Carpenter. He was a son of the Rev. Samuel Barstow Carpenter and his wife Ruth Berrien (Jones), née Mary Ruth Jones, daughter of Charles Colcock Jones Jr. He married in 1928 to Alexandra Morrison, with whom he had four children.

== Education and ministry ==
Carpenter was a student at Lawrenceville School from 1915 to 1917. He then studied at Princeton University and graduated with a Bachelor of Arts in 1921 and with a Bachelor of Divinity from the Virginia Theological Seminary in 1926. He was then ordained a deacon on June 24, 1925, and a priest on June 24, 1926. He then became rector of Grace Church in Waycross, Georgia, while in 1928 he became Archdeacon of Georgia. From 1929 to 1936 he served as rector of St John's Church in Savannah, Georgia, becoming rector of the Church of the Advent, Birmingham, Alabama in 1936.

== Ceremony at University of the South ==
At a special chapel service at the University of the South to celebrate Jefferson Davis' birthday, the university's Ceremonial Mace, containing the Confederate flag, was consecrated to the memory of Nathan Bedford Forrest, the first Grand Wizard of the Ku Klux Klan, by Bishop Carpenter.

== "A Call for Unity" ==
Carpenter was one of eight white Alabama clergy who publicly opposed the 1963 Birmingham campaign for integration and wrote the "A Call for Unity" letter on April 12, 1963, to which the Rev. Martin Luther King Jr. responded with his "Letter from Birmingham Jail" on April 16, 1963.

== 1951 opposition to a segregated school ==
On July 13, 2007, a letter from Carpenter's son, the Rev. Douglas Carpenter, was published by the Episcopal Life Online Newslink emphasizing his father's stance on the issue of desegregation: "My father, C.C.J. Carpenter, was a bishop of the Alabama Diocese from 1938, when I was just turned 5, until 1968. In 1951, a parish in Mobile wanted to start a parochial school. He gave his approval only when they agreed it could be integrated. Actions such as this put him on the hit list of the White Citizens Council and the Ku Klux Klan. He got frequent hate threats by phone."

Episcopal Church (USA) titles
Preceded by	Episcopal Diocese of Alabama; June 24, 1938 – 1968	Succeeded by
