= Henry N. Parsley Jr. =

American prelate

The Right Reverend Henry Nutt Parsley D.D.
- Bishop of Alabama
- Church: Episcopal Church
- Diocese: Alabama
- Elected: January 9, 1996
- In office: 1999–2012
- Predecessor: Robert O. Miller
- Successor: Kee Sloan
- Other post: Provisional bishop of Easton (2014-2016) Visiting bishop of South Carolina (2020-2021)
- Previous post: Coadjutor Bishop of Alabama (1996-1998)

Orders
- Ordination: April 1974
- Consecration: September 28, 1996 by Edmond L. Browning

Personal details
- Born: October 29, 1948 (age 77) Memphis, Tennessee, United States
- Denomination: Anglican
- Parents: Henry Nutt Parsley & Barbara Brown Burch
- Spouse: Rebecca Knox Allison (m. 1970)
- Children: 1

Henry Nutt Parsley, Jr. (born October 29, 1948) is an American prelate of the Episcopal Church and the retired tenth Bishop of Alabama, and the former Provisional Bishop of the Diocese of Easton. Parsley is also a former Chancellor of the University of the South in Sewanee, Tennessee. He now resides in Wilmington, North Carolina and attends St. James Parish in Wilmington.

In January 2006, Parsley was nominated for Presiding Bishop of the Episcopal Church, and came in second in balloting to Katharine Jefferts Schori during voting at the General Convention of the Episcopal Church in the United States of America in Columbus, Ohio.

== Early life and education ==
Henry Nutt Parsley, Jr. was born in Memphis, Tennessee in 1948, son of Henry Nutt Parsley, Sr., an Episcopal priest, and his wife Barbara. He is the grandnephew of Eliza Hall Nutt Parsley. Parsley attended the Porter-Gaud School, an Episcopal college preparatory school in Charleston, South Carolina. He received his undergraduate education in English literature at the University of the South (magna cum laude, Phi Beta Kappa, 1970), and his Master of Divinity from The General Theological Seminary (1973). He has studied at Oxford University in the areas of spirituality and soteriology, and received honorary Doctor of Divinity degrees from both the University of the South (1998) and The General Theological Seminary (1998).

== Ministry ==
Parsley served in a number of parish churches in South Carolina and North Carolina and was for five years headmaster of a parochial school. Parsley served as President of the Standing Committee and on the Board of Porter-Gaud School. His last parochial assignment was as rector of Christ Church, Charlotte, North Carolina (1986-1996). While rector of Christ Church he chaired the AIDS Committee of the Episcopal Diocese of North Carolina, served on the diocesan Council, and on the Program Committee of Kanuga Conferences.

Parsley served as Bishop Coadjutor of the Episcopal Diocese of Alabama for two years (1996-1998), before becoming diocesan bishop in 1999. He served as the tenth Bishop of Alabama from 1999 to 2012, during which time he oversaw a diocese, encompassing the northern two-thirds of the state, comprising 92 parishes, eight campus ministries, and several institutions, that serves over 35,000 Episcopalians. During his episcopate, the Alabama diocese was unusual in that it continued to grow in membership, unlike most of the rest of the Episcopal Church, and maintained a strong cohesiveness, with some exceptions, in the face of mounting controversies roiling the denomination over human sexuality and differing interpretations of the Christian faith. Parsley was a member of the international board of the Colleges and Universities of the Anglican Communion from 2004 to 2014.

In January 2006, he was nominated for Presiding Bishop of the Episcopal Church, coming in second to Katharine Jefferts-Shori, then Bishop of Nevada, during the General Convention of the Episcopal Church held that summer in Columbus, Ohio. On February 12, 2010, during his address at the 179th annual convention of the Episcopal Diocese of Alabama, Parsley announced his plan to retire as diocesan bishop. John McKee Sloan, eleventh Bishop of Alabama, who was elected as Bishop Suffragan of Alabama in the summer of 2007 and consecrated in 2008, was installed as the diocesan bishop on January 7, 2012.

Parsley served his undergraduate alma mater as Chancellor of the University of the South (the titular head of the institution), as well as on the board of trustees and on the Board of Regents. He has preached on the Protestant Hour (now Day 1) and was active in many outreach ministries of the Episcopal Church, including serving on the Board of the Presiding Bishops Fund for World Relief (now Episcopal Relief & Development). He served as a clerical deputy to the General Convention in 1982, 1985, 1994, and thereafter in the House of Bishops from 1997 forward. Parsley attended two Lambeth Conferences, in 1998 and 2008, serving on the section that addressed human sexuality in 2008 and preaching at St Paul's Cathedral, London during the conference.

Known as a moderate in the wider Church, Parsley was highly respected among his peers in the House of Bishops, where he served as Chair of the Theology Committee, and was a member of the Planning Committee. He chaired the Standing Commission on Stewardship and Development from 1998 and the Church Pension Fund's Abundance Committee from 2001.

In May 2014, a convention of the Episcopal Diocese of Easton elected Parsley as Provisional Bishop to succeed their retiring bishop, James Shand. A special convention to formally elect him as Bishop Provisional for the Episcopal Diocese of Easton was held on June 16, 2014, and he was formally installed a month later. He served until a new Bishop of Easton was elected in 2016.

Parsley currently serves on the Board of The Ayres Center for Spiritual Development at St. Mary's, Sewanee.

Parsley is the 923rd bishop in the American Succession of the Episcopal Church.

In January 2020 he became a visiting bishop for the Diocese of South Carolina serving until the election of a new bishop for the diocese in 2021.

== Personal and Family Life ==
He has been married to the former Rebecca Knox Allison (Becky) since 1970 and they reside in Wilmington, North Carolina. They are the parents of Henry Nutt Parsley III. The younger Parsley and his wife work in management for the Broadway theatre, currently with the show Hamilton on tour.
