= St. Paul's Episcopal Church (Selma, Alabama) =

Historic church in Alabama, United States

- U.S. National Register of Historic Places
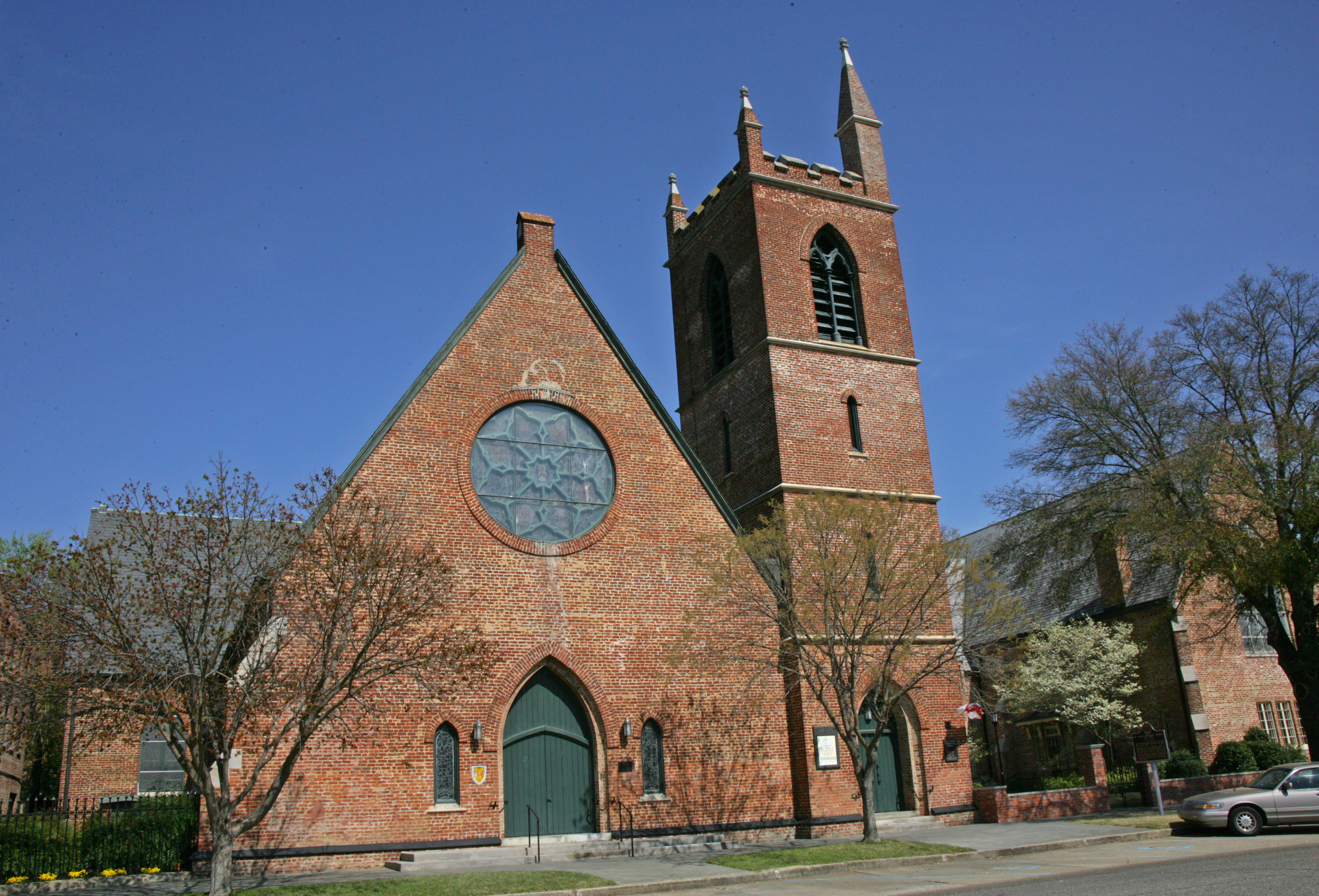
- St. Paul's Episcopal in 2008

- Location within Alabama Location within the United States
- Location: 210 Lauderdale Street; Selma, Alabama
- Coordinates: 32°24′31″N 87°1′18″W
- Built: 1871-1875
- Architect: The firm of Richard Upjohn and Richard M. Upjohn
- Architectural style: Gothic Revival
- NRHP reference No.: 75000311
- Added to NRHP: March 25, 1975

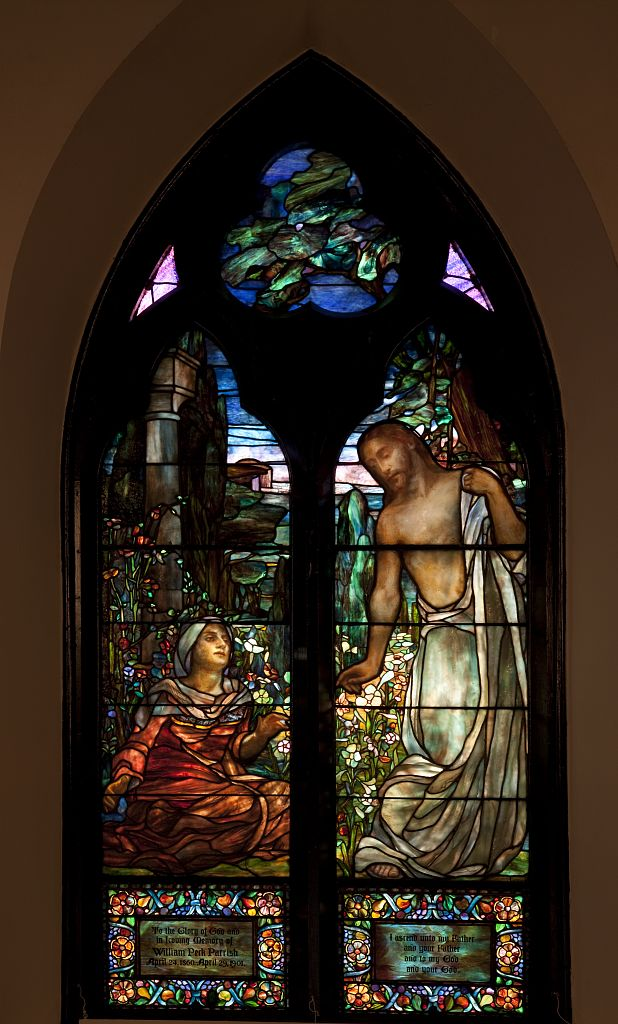
Tiffany stained glass window at St. Paul's, Selma

St. Paul's Episcopal Church is an historic red brick Gothic Revival church located at 210 Lauderdale Street in Selma, Alabama, United States. The parish was established in 1838 and its original sanctuary building was burned on April 2, 1865 during the Battle of Selma, with credit for that act going to Union General James H. Wilson. The current building was designed by the famous New York City architectural firm of Richard Upjohn and was completed in 1875.

The interior features several Tiffany stained glass windows designed by parishioner and Selma native, Clara Weaver Parrish, who was a noted artist who worked for Tiffany Studios in New York.

St. Paul's Episcopal Church was added to the National Register of Historic Places on March 25, 1975.

St. Paul's Episcopal Church is a parish in the Episcopal Diocese of Alabama. The Rev. Amy George is currently serving as the twenty third rector.

== See also ==
- National Register of Historic Places listings in Dallas County, Alabama
