= Christ Episcopal Church (Tuscaloosa, Alabama) =

- Location within Alabama
- 33.20772°N 87.57089°W
- Location: Tuscaloosa, Alabama

History
- Founded: 1830

Site notes
- Architectural style: Gothic Revival

Alabama Register of Landmarks and Heritage
- Official name: Christ Episcopal Church
- Designated: July 28, 1975

Christ Episcopal Church is a historic Episcopal church building in Tuscaloosa, Alabama. It was organized on January 7, 1828, by thirteen men who elected the first vestry that night. In the first year, the vestry hired the architect William Nichols to design the building and oversee its construction. The building was added to the Alabama Register of Landmarks and Heritage on July 28, 1975.

== History ==
The lot was purchased from the "Mayor and Aldermen of the Town of Tuskaloosa" for $150.00, and the cost of the building was $1,700.00. Twenty-five pews were placed in the church and were sold for bids ranging from $75 to $150 or were rented for $8 a year. This was the only source of income at the time. The building was completed, and on April 12, 1831, the University of Alabama held charter ceremonies here. Additions and changes to the church building have taken place over the years: in 1882 the building was enlarged and remodeled from Greek Revival to Gothic Revival style, and the bell tower was added. An organ was installed in 1830 when the building was finished, but in 1941 the console was moved from the south to the north side of the chancel. The parish hall and rectory were begun in 1906, but in 1952 the old rectory was torn down and ground was broken for the chapel and education building. In 1984 a narthex was added on the west end of the nave to protect the church from street noise, and at the same time, a cloistered walk was built from the education building and the bell tower. Today, Christ Church is the oldest church in the Diocese of Alabama. Thirty-five stained glass windows add colorful inspiration to the buildings on the property: seventeen in the main church, eight in the parish hall, six in the chapel, four in the narthex and a domed ceiling in the chancel. The Rev. Albert A. Muller was the first rector to serve Christ Church.
