= Episcopal Diocese of Alabama =

Episcopal Church diocese in the US

Coordinates: 33°31′6.85″N 86°48′28.57″W

Diocese of Alabama
- Diocesan Seal of the Diocese of Alabama

Location
- Country: United States
- Territory: Northern and central Alabama
- Ecclesiastical province: Province IV
- Headquarters: Carpenter House, Birmingham

Statistics
- Parishes: 87 (2024)
- Members: 29,180 (2023)

Information
- Denomination: Episcopal Church
- Established: January 25, 1830
- Cathedral: Cathedral Church of the Advent
- Patron saint: Jonathan Daniels

Current leadership
- Bishop: Richard T. Lawson

Map
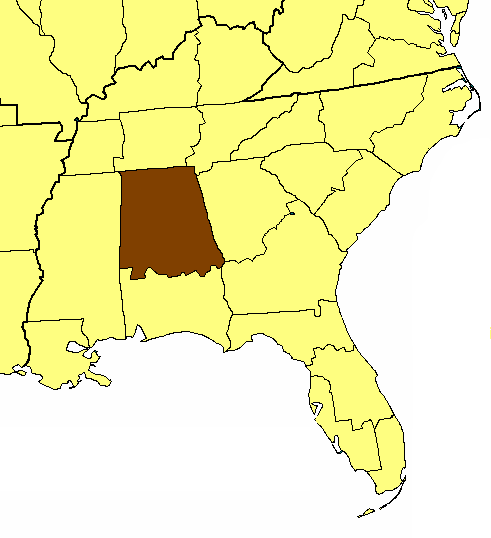

The Episcopal Diocese of Alabama is located in Province IV of the Episcopal Church and serves the state of Alabama with the exception of the extreme southern region, including Mobile, which forms part of the Diocese of the Central Gulf Coast. The latter body was formed in 1970 from portions of the territories of the Diocese of Alabama and the Diocese of Florida.

The diocese reported 32,160 members in 2018 and 29,180 members in 2023; no membership statistics were reported in 2024 national parochial reports. Plate and pledge income for the 87 filing congregations of the diocese in 2024 was $38,614,024. Average Sunday attendance (ASA) reported for 2024 was 7,538 persons. This was a relative decrease from ASA of 9376 persons reported in 2016.

The current and 13th bishop of Alabama is the Right Reverend Richard T. Lawson, former dean of the Cathedral of St. John in the Wilderness, in Denver, Colorado. He was consecrated and installed on June 27, 2026. The Cathedral Church of the Advent in Birmingham serves as its cathedral. The bishop's offices are located at Carpenter House in Birmingham which is next to the Church of the Advent, a pre-existing parish that the diocese designated as its cathedral in 1982.

On January 31, 2026, the diocese elected the Very Rev. Richard T. Lawson III as its next diocesan bishop.

The diocese currently includes 87 parishes as well as college campus ministries and Camp McDowell, the diocesan camp and conference center, located in Nauvoo, Alabama, in the northwestern part of the state.

Alabama is the only diocese in the Episcopal Church where there are no mission congregations; that is, all churches are expected to be self-supporting and self-governing parishes, with diocesan subsidies reserved for new church starts only. The policy was instituted by Bishop Furman C. Stough in the 1970s.

Like most of its southern neighbors, the diocese's churchmanship heritage is predominantly of the low variety, reflecting the influence of the founders' origins in places like Virginia and South Carolina. In colonial times, those southern colonies were bastions of evangelical, even Calvinist sentiment among the Anglican clergy and gentry. And like the ECUSA in general, the diocese's members are mostly affluent professionals and businesspeople, often among the wealthiest residents of their respective communities, some of whom have maintained Episcopalian affiliation for several generations. However, these people have largely co-existed peacefully with more liberal parishioners who look upon the Episcopal Church as an alternative to mostly fundamentalist options within Southern Protestantism. This is especially true in some of the smaller municipalities of Alabama where the Diocese has parishes, which are frequently the only churches within their communities that do not hold to strict biblical inerrancy, stringent personal morality, and stridently conservative politics.

The Anglican realignment movement among conservatives in protest against the consecration of the openly gay bishop Gene Robinson in the 2000s had mostly a minor impact in Alabama. However, the Cathedral Church of the Advent is considered a significant parish among remaining conservative congregations in the Episcopal Church nationally. In a situation that is unusual for cathedrals in the U.S. its relationship to the Diocese of Alabama has been strained. In 2019, the search committee for the new bishop identified the beleaguered relationship as one of four major challenges facing the diocese. The cathedral's vestry announced the resignation of the cathedral's dean, the Very Rev. Andrew Pearson in April 2021. After leaving in May, he was received into the Anglican Church in North America. In late June 2021, the diocesan bishop, Glenda Curry, and the cathedral published a covenant statement recognizing the cathedral's "Protestant, evangelical" expression of Anglicanism and providing a framework for a renewed collaborative relationship.

In January 2026, the diocese named Episcopal seminarian and civil rights martyr, Jonathan Daniels, as its patron.

== List of bishops ==
Bishops of Alabama
From	Until	Incumbent	Notes
1844	1861	Nicholas Hamner Cobbs	Died in office.
1861	1900	Richard Hooker Wilmer	Elected and consecrated in the Confederate Episcopal Church. Died in office.
1900	1902	Robert Woodward Barnwell	(December 27, 1849, Beaufort, SC – July 24, 1902, Selma, AL)
1902	1928	Charles Minnigerode Beckwith	Charles Minnigerode Beckwith (June 3, 1851, Prince George County, VA – April 18, 1928)
1928	1938	William G. McDowell	William George McDowell, Junior (August 2, 1882, Lexington, VA – 1938)
1938	1968	Charles Colcock Jones Carpenter	
1968	1970	George Mosley Murray	Translated to Central Gulf Coast and became its first diocesan bishop.
1971	1988	Bill Stough	Furman Charles Stough (July 11, 1928, Montgomery, AL – 2004)
1988	1998	Robert O. Miller	Robert Oran Miller (February 14, 1935, Wynnville, AL – June 29, 2009, Birmingham, AL)
1999	2012	Henry Nutt Parsley, Jr.	
2012	2021	Kee Sloan	
2021	2026	Glenda S. Curry	
2026	present	Richard T. Lawson	
Suffragan and assistant bishops
From	Until	Incumbent	Notes
1891	1900	Henry Melville Jackson, assistant bishop	Henry Melville Jackson, Senior (July 28, 1840, Leesburg, VA – May 4, 1900, Eufaula, AL)
1949	1953	Randolph R. Claiborne, Jr., suffragan bishop	Translated to Atlanta.
1984	1984	William Dimmick, assistant bishop	William Arthur Dimmick; previously Bishop of Northern Michigan then assistant bishop of Minnesota.
1986	1989	Robert O. Miller, suffragan bishop	Invested as diocesan bishop.
1999	2002	Onell Soto, assistant bishop	Previously Bishop of Venezuela then assistant bishop of Atlanta.
2002	2006	Marc Handley Andrus, suffragan bishop	Translated to California.
2007	2012	Kee Sloan, suffragan bishop	Invested as diocesan bishop.
2012	2016	Santosh Marray, assistant bishop	Former assistant bishop of The Diocese of East Carolina, translated to Easton.
2022	2025	Brian Prior, assisting bishop	Former bishop of Minnesota

== Churches ==
The Diocese of Alabama comprises 87 parishes. Christ Episcopal Church (Tuscaloosa, Alabama) is the oldest parish in continuous existence in the diocese, founded in 1828. The oldest parish in the state of Alabama is Christ Church Cathedral (Mobile, Alabama), but it is presently located in the Diocese of the Central Gulf Coast.

The 1970 division of the Alabama diocese, for most of its history a statewide body, was necessitated because of strong membership growth (both in existing and then-new parishes) in metropolitan areas like Birmingham, Mobile, Montgomery, and Huntsville going back to about 1945, after the end of World War II. Unlike most other Episcopal dioceses, though, growth continued in Alabama long after it dissipated elsewhere in the 1970s and 1980s.
