= Cathedral Church of the Advent (Birmingham, Alabama) =

Historic church in Alabama, United States

- Episcopal Church of the Advent
- U.S. National Register of Historic Places
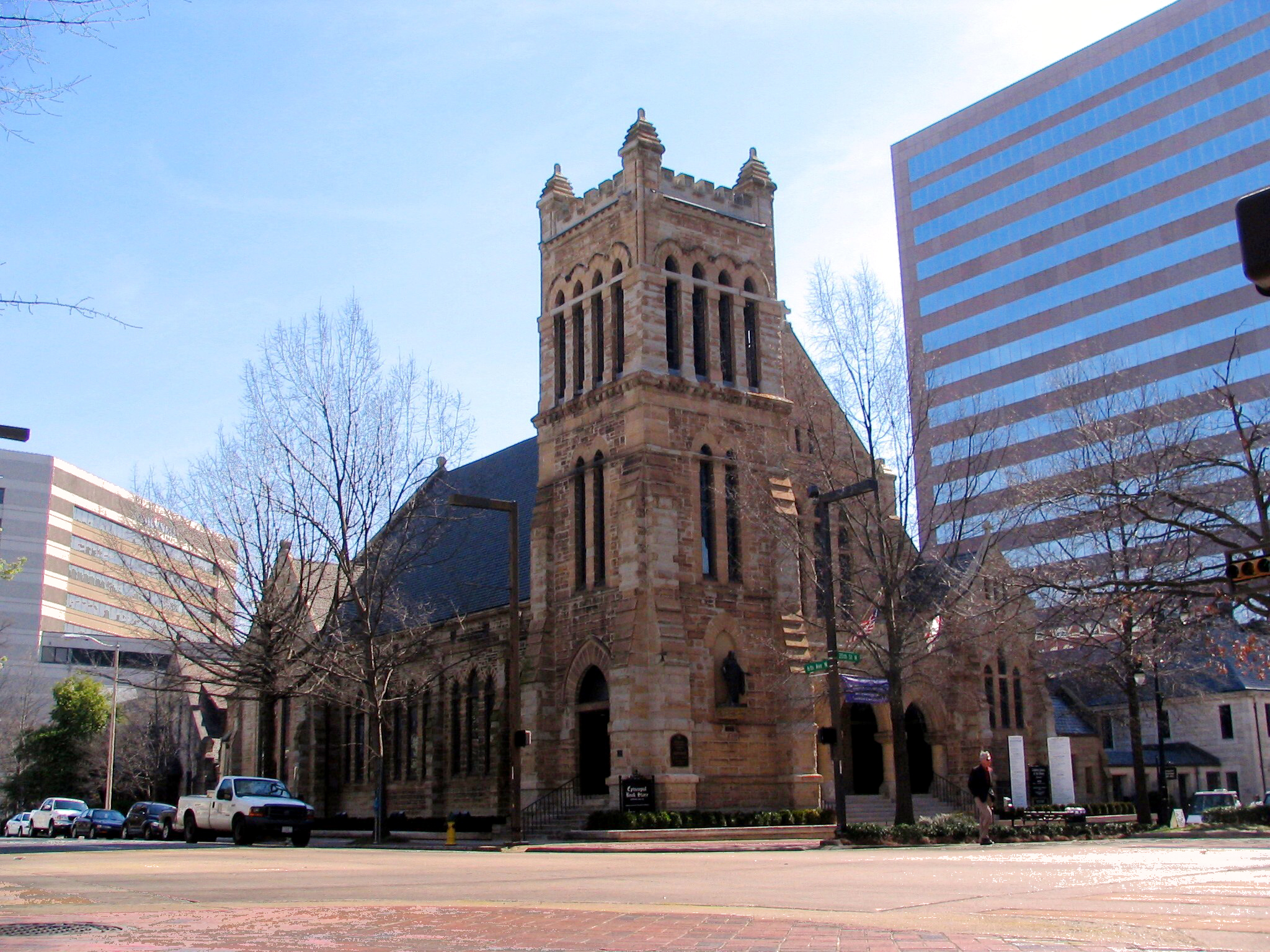
- The church in 2006
- Location: 2017 6th Avenue North (at 20th Street); Birmingham, Alabama
- Coordinates: 33°31′9″N 86°48′30″W
- Built: 1893-1895
- Architect: Charles Wheelock
- Architectural style: Gothic
- Website: https://adventbirmingham.org/
- NRHP reference No.: 83002972
- Added to NRHP: March 30, 1983

The Cathedral Church of the Advent in Birmingham, Alabama, is the see church of the Episcopal Diocese of Alabama. On March 30, 1983, the structure was added to the National Register of Historic Places as the Episcopal Church of the Advent.

== History ==
The parish church of the Advent was established in 1872, one year after the founding of the city of Birmingham, and was one of the first churches built in the new city. The first building on this site was completed in 1873, but was destroyed by fire on November 24, 1892. The current structure was already underway at that date. It was designed by Wheelock, Joy, and Wheelock, was occupied in the fall of 1893, with the tower and portico undergoing construction until 1895. The parish's second rector John Gardner Murray (in office 1896-1903) would later become the first elected presiding bishop of the Episcopal Church. The cathedral is known for its prominent location on Twentieth Street North near Linn Park, as well as for the reputation of its music program. It was not until 1982 that the Church of the Advent became a cathedral, when the Diocese of Alabama selected the church as its seat.

== 21st century ==
The congregation undertook a major project to preserve the Scioto sandstone exterior of the Cathedral between 1999 and 2005. During this same period the Rector's Garden was redesigned to improve drainage and accommodate a columbarium and the belltower was refitted for a carillon of fifteen bells, cast by Fonderie Paccard of Lac d'Annecy, France. In both 2005 and 2012, readers of the Birmingham News named the cathedral choir "Best Church Choir". Today, the Church of the Advent comprises nearly 4,000 members, making it one of the ten largest Episcopal churches in the United States.

For several decades the Advent has been among the more conservative parishes in its diocese. In 2003, the then-dean Paul F. M. Zahl hung a black flag on the cathedral in protest of the election of Gene Robinson as the first openly gay bishop in the Episcopal Church. The parish has also identified itself as being squarely on the Protestant side of the Anglican via media. In 1998 Dean Zahl published The Protestant Face of Anglicanism and around 2018 the parish shifted from the 1979 American Book of Common Prayer to the 1662 English Book of Common Prayer for portions of the liturgy because they more clearly reflect the Protestant doctrine of justification by faith alone. In 2016, the Advent hired Zac Hicks, a presbyter in the Evangelical Presbyterian Church as its canon for liturgy and worship.

From 2013 to May 16, 2021, the dean and rector was the Very Reverend Andrew C. Pearson Jr. In 2019, the search committee for the new bishop identified the beleaguered relationship as one of four major challenges facing the diocese. The parish vestry announced Pearson's resignation on April 28, 2021, stating that he was resigning as dean due to "the ongoing tension he feels in serving in the Episcopal Church." After leaving the Advent he was released at his request from the Episcopal Church and received into the Anglican Church of North America. In September 2021 he started start a new Anglican congregation in Birmingham known as Grace Church. The Reverend Canon Craig Smalley was named interim dean and rector in May 2021 and after an international search named the permanent dean and rector in May 2022.

In June 2021, the Advent and the diocese affirmed a new covenant recognizing the cathedral’s commitment to a Protestant, evangelical expression of Anglicanism and stating that the it would return to the use of the 1979 Book of Common Prayer (Rite I) for its principal services. In August 2021, Zac Hicks, the canon for liturgy and worship, also left the cathedral staff. Strains between the Advent and the diocese again became public in December 2021 when the diocesan bishop, Glenda Curry, ordained four individuals to the priesthood at the cathedral one of whom was in a same-sex marriage. When this detail was made public by conservative Anglicans, cathedral leaders complained that the bishop had not told them of the individual's status. The bishop in turn stated that it was not a secret and that as a diocesan event, she did not see the ordination as an event that should be seen as reflecting the Advent's particular theological views.

The cathedral campus is also home to the Advent Episcopal Day School. Carpenter House, the headquarters building for the Diocese of Alabama, is connected to the cathedral building by a cloister.

== See also ==
- List of the Episcopal cathedrals of the United States
- List of cathedrals in the United States
- National Register of Historic Places listings in Jefferson County, Alabama
