= Raimundo de Ovies =

American religious leader, author, columnist, and humanitarian

Raimundo de Ovies was an English-born American religious leader, author, columnist, and humanitarian. Born in Liverpool, England in 1877, he was dean of the Cathedral of St. Philip, Atlanta from 1928 to his retirement in 1947. De Ovies was a columnist for the Atlanta Constitution from 1932 to 1949 as well as host of a number of radio shows on WSB-Radio (now WSB-AM).

Raimundo George Cassidy Saulus de Coreno Muniz de Ovies was born on January 8, 1877, in Liverpool, England, to Julian and Eleanor (Cassidy) de Ovies. Julian de Ovies was born in Spain and worked as a foreign correspondent, but as a young man had served as an officer in the Carlist Army in Spain and as a result was banished from that country. In 1887 the de Ovies family emigrated from Liverpool to New York City, but it is unknown as to the reasons why the family came to America. Upon coming to United States the de Ovies family lived in New York City and Boston and while living in Boston de Ovies prepared for college at the Boston Latin School. De Ovies would leave Boston in 1896 for the University of the South where he studied theology.

== Ordination and Early Service ==
During his time at Sewanee de Ovies's ministry began with his ordination to the deaconate in 1900 and three years later he was ordained as a minister. De Ovies's first assignment was as rector for Grace Church in Sheffield, Alabama, from 1901 to 1903. On June 18, 1902, he would marry Elizabeth Eggleston DuBose, the daughter of Robert Marion DuBose, longtime Treasurer of the university and descended from a number of prominent South Carolina families. The years following his marriage were ones of constant moving: 18 months as rector of St. John's Church in Ensley, Alabama, and after that setting up St. Andrew's Church in Birmingham, Alabama. While at St. Andrew's de Ovies began to demonstrate his civic-mindedness, teaming up with the Rev. Carl Hencknell, the Rector of All Saints, and Dr. James E. Dedman, the City of Birmingham health officer in 1911 to start the Holy Innocents Hospital. Founded as a "charity institution for children home" in the words of Rev. Henckell the hospital would evolve into today's Children's Health System of Birmingham. Following Birmingham were stints in Greensboro, Alabama, and Clarksville, Tennessee, where he helped organize, put into action, and was chief probation officer of that city's juvenile court. While at Clarksville de Ovies would be cited by the Red Cross for conspicuous service during the Influenza Outbreak in 1918.

== The 1920s ==
At the end of World War I de Ovies would accept the position as rector at Trinity Church in Galveston, Texas, and the family would move there. While in Galveston de Ovies would serve in the unlikely role as a radio announcer for KFUI, becoming one of the first ministers to reach out to new audiences via the nascent medium of radio. De Ovies's stint as rector in Galveston would be the longest the family had remained in one place, but in 1927 he was offered the opportunity to return to the University of the South, this time as Chaplain for the university. De Ovies had gained wide admiration for his charitable works and service to the Episcopal Church and when the position of Dean at the Cathedral of St. Philip in Atlanta became vacant in 1928 de Ovies was viewed as a leading candidate. Directly opposite the Georgia State Capitol, St. Philip's was the seat for the Diocese of Atlanta, created in 1907 and the position of Dean would carry great influence in the Diocese, in the City of Atlanta and beyond.

== Tenure as Dean of the Cathedral of St. Philip ==
In spite of the financial concerns of the Depression era the ground for the new Pro-Cathedral was broken at the site between Peachtree Street and Andrews Drive on 18 June 1933. The Cathedral put forward $45,000.00 to purchase the site in the very desirable and fashionable Buckhead District and de Ovies became a key backer of the move. Construction at the site proceeded quickly and on 10 September 1933 Bishop Mikell consecrated the new Cathedral building, designated as the Pro-Cathedral as the structure was not yet in full status or function as a true Cathedral. De Ovies work with children would become a leitmotif throughout his life and in 1934 the National Council of Christian Social Services of the National Council would publish The Church and Family Relations, a short compilation of articles on the subject by de Ovies. De Ovies had begun writing a thrice-weekly column for the Atlanta Journal in 1930, along with the occasional full-length Sunday article, giving him wider exposure beyond the church.

De Ovies's first book, Somewhere to be Had, was released in 1937 by the McClure Newspaper Syndicate and the book sold out very quickly. A second edition was released in 1938 by Morehouse-Gorham in far larger numbers and the book became a best-seller in Atlanta and beyond, with the New York Times listing it as the best-selling general topic book in Atlanta the week of January 3, 1938. He completed his second book The Church and Her Children, which was released in 1941. The book was an outgrowth of de Ovies's years of work teaching Sunday school, engaged in childhood psychology, and counseling parents on childrearing. The book sold well, but with the coming of World War II it was not the best-seller that Somewhere to be Had was, largely as the public's attention was focused on more dire and pressing concerns.

== Tenure as Dean Emeritus ==
On Sunday, 22 July 1946 de Ovies stunned parishioners at St. Philip's by announced from the pulpit that he would step down as Dean effective December 31. Shortly thereafter, de Ovies was named Dean Emeritus of the cathedral. In 1947, de Ovies released But, Maybe You're Not Crazy, his third book, this one an attempt to demystify and explain psychology to lay people. The book sold as well as de Ovies's two previous books, but despite its commercial success, it did not receive universal critical acclaim. De Ovies was unfazed by any criticism; when Your Life offered to publish a 10,000-word condensation of the book, he leapt at the opportunity. Two years later, de Ovies would serve as officiant at the funeral of longtime friend and fellow Atlanta Journal contributor Margaret Mitchell.

De Ovies's time as Dean Emeritus became a time of accolades bestowed on him by the cathedral. In 1950, Dr. Henry Noble was commissioned to create a bronze bust of Dean de Ovies to commemorate his service to the cathedral. His retirement years were anything but quiet, with de Ovies assisting in setting up the Georgian Clinic for the treatment of alcoholics in 1953, serving in the role as director of religious therapy in counseling individuals undergoing rehabilitation there. In 1958 de Ovies began writing a column for the Metropolitan Herald, an Atlanta weekly newspaper.

De Ovies was on the cutting edge of treating alcoholism as a treatable illness. His book Dear Drunks, published in 1958, was an outgrowth of his sessions treating alcoholics and an effort to de-stigmatize alcoholism and its treatment in an era when most people saw alcoholism as a person failing or a lack of self-control or discipline. That same April, the magazine Pastoral Psychology named de Ovies its "Man of the Month" for his work as chaplain of the Peachtree Sanitarium and at the Georgian Clinic.

== Later years ==
The last two years of de Ovies's life were years of considerable sadness and loss. In 1960, he discontinued his weekly column in the Atlanta Herald. Then, on 22 February 1961, he suffered the loss of his daughter-in-law and great-granddaughter when his son's car was struck by a freight train near Calera, Alabama. A little more than seven months later, his wife Elizabeth de Ovies would die on 2 October 1961 at age 80.

De Ovies would live to see the Cathedral he so long dreamed of come to fruition. Ground was broken for the massive structure on Thanksgiving Day 1959, and on 13 May 1962 the Cathedral of St. Philip was dedicated by Bishop Randolph R. Claiborne, Jr., Dean Alfred Hardman, and the Presiding Bishop of the Episcopal Church the Most Reverend Arthur C. Lichtenberger. De Ovies was there, aged 85; however, he was frail and unable to participate in the service. Ten days later, Atlanta suffered the crash of the airliner Chateau de Sully at Orly Airport, just outside Paris, France. Three months later, de Ovies's suffering would end. Dying on 31 August 1962, his passing was a leading story of the day for both the Atlanta Journal and Atlanta Constitution. Bishop Claiborne would say of de Ovies "Dean de Ovies was one of Atlanta's influential citizens for over 30 years. He was a pastor of compassion at heart and profound understanding. Under his leadership, the present location of our splendid Cathedral was acquired. He was my personal friend for many years, and as a young minister I was inspired by his preaching."

== Books by Raimundo de Ovies ==
- Somewhere to be Had (1937 - 1st Edition by McClure; 1938 - 2nd Edition by Morehouse - Gorham)
- The Church and Her Children (1941 - Morehouse-Gorham)
- But, Maybe You're Not Crazy: An Introduction to Psychiatry (1947 - Tupper & Love)
- Dear Drunk (1958 - Herald Publishing)

=== Primary sources ===
- De Ovies, Raimundo. The Church and Family Relations. New York: National Council, Department of Christian Social Service, 1934.
- De Ovies, Raimundo. Somewhere to be Had. New York: Morehouse-Goreham, 1938.
- De Ovies, Raimundo. The Church and Her Children. New York: Morehouse-Goreham, 1941.
- De Ovies, Raimundo. “Immortality,” The American Pulpit Series Book Eleven, Nashville, TN: Abingdon-Cokesbury Press, 1946, pages 93–99.
- De Ovies, Raimundo. Maybe You're Not Crazy: An Introduction to Psychiatry. New York: Tupper & Love, 1947
- De Ovies, Raimundo. Dear Drunks. Atlanta: Herald Publishing Company, 1958.
- Atlanta Constitution, August 1928 – November 1962
- Atlanta Journal, August 1928 – November 1962
- New York Times, “Best Sellers of the Week Here and Elsewhere,” Jan 3, 1938
- New York Times, “Court Protects “Tobacco Road,” Nov 23, 1938
- New York Times, “Miss Mitchell, 49, Dead of Injuries,” Aug 17, 1949
- New York Times, “Simple Rites Held for Miss Mitchell,” Aug 19, 1949
- New York Times, “Psychiatric Work by Clergy Urged,” Oct 20, 1955
- Journal of the Protestant Episcopal Church in the Diocese of Atlanta, Twenty-Second Annual Meeting Held in Christ Church Macon, Georgia January 23 and 24, 1929. Atlanta, GA: Episcopal Diocese of Atlanta, 1929.
- Minutes of the Twenty Seventh Annual Meeting of the Council of the Church held in the Church of the Epiphany, Atlanta, Georgia January 24, 1934. Atlanta, GA: Episcopal Diocese of Atlanta, 1934.
- Journal of the Protestant Episcopal Church in the Diocese of Atlanta, Fifty Sixth Annual Session Held in Cathedral of St. Philip Atlanta, Georgia January 23, and 24th, 1963. Atlanta, GA: Episcopal Diocese of Atlanta, 1963.
- England and Wales Birth Register for West Derby, Lancashire, England, Vol. 8B, page 372.
- State of Georgia Death certificate #2833 for E. M. de Ovies. February 7, 1950.
- State of Georgia Death certificate #24029 for E. P. de Ovies. October 2, 1961.
- State of Georgia Death certificate #22420 for Raimundo de Ovies. August 30, 1962.
- World War I Draft Registration Card for Raminudo George Cassidy De Ovies. Morrow, GA: National Archives and Records Administration. September 12, 1918.
- 1881 England Census of Liverpool, Lancashire, England. Enumeration District 96, Folio 76, page 41.
- 1920 Federal Census of Galveston Ward 4, Galveston, Texas. Morrow, GA: National Archives and Records Administration. Record Group T625 Roll 1806, page 13B, Enumeration District 38.

=== Secondary sources ===
- Abrams, Ann Uhry. Explosion at Orly: The Disaster that Transformed Atlanta. Atlanta: Avion Press, 2002.
- Allen, Frederick. Atlanta Rising. Marietta, GA: Longstreet Press, 1996.
- Barnard, Susan Kessler. Buckhead: A Place for All Time. Athens, GA: Hill Street Press, 1999.
- Children's Health System. https://web.archive.org/web/20070928020516/http://www.chsys.org/default.aspx?id=12
- Ely, Mary Dykema. “Review of Maybe You’re Not Crazy. An Introduction to Psychiatry,” The Quarterly Review of Biology 24 no. 3 (Sep. 1949): 269.
- Malone, Henry Thompson. The Episcopal Church in Georgia 1733–1957. Atlanta: The Protestant Episcopal Church in the Diocese of Atlanta, 1960.
- Martin, Harold H. Atlanta and Environs A Chronicle of Its People and Events: Years of Change and Challenge 1940-1976 Vol. III. Athens: University of Georgia Press, 1987
- McFarland, Anne Arant. The Atlanta Symphony Orchestra: The Sopkin Years (1945–1966). Masters Thesis UGA 1976.
- Mosca, Alexandra K. “The Life and Death of Margaret Mitchell.” American Funeral Director (March 2004).
