= John M. Walker (bishop) =

American Episcopal bishop

The Right Reverend John Moore Walker D.D.
- Bishop of Atlanta
- Church: Episcopal Church
- Diocese: Atlanta
- Elected: April 30, 1942
- In office: 1942–1951
- Predecessor: Henry J. Mikell
- Successor: John B. Walthour

Orders
- Ordination: June 24, 1914 by Frederick F. Reese
- Consecration: September 29, 1942 by Henry St. George Tucker

Personal details
- Born: November 24, 1888 Macon, Georgia, United States
- Died: July 16, 1951 (aged 62) Atlanta, Georgia, United States
- Denomination: Anglican
- Parents: John Moore Walker & Clara Pruyn Roosevelt
- Spouse: Julia Benedict (m. 1915)
- Education: University of Georgia

John Moore Walker, Jr. (November 24, 1888 - July 16, 1951) was the 3rd bishop in the Episcopal Diocese of Atlanta, and was the 1st bishop born in the state of Georgia to a bishop in the state of Georgia.

== Background ==
Walker was born on November 24, 1888, in Macon, Georgia, to John Moore Walker, Sr., and Clara Pruyn Roosevelt. In 1910 he graduated Phi Beta Kappa from the University of Georgia. In 1913 he received his Bachelor of Divinity from the University of the South in Sewanee, Tennessee. Frederick F. Reese ordained Walker as a deacon and later as a priest at Christ Church in Macon, Georgia, Walker's childhood parish.

From 1914 to 1918, Walker served several southeast Georgia towns as a Missionary Priest. Finally, in 1918, he was called to be rector of St Paul's Church in Albany, Georgia. In 1926 he became rector of St Peter's Church in Charlotte, North Carolina, and in 1931 became rector of St. Luke's Episcopal Church in Atlanta, Georgia. In 1942 he was elected bishop of Atlanta and consecrated on September 29, 1942, St Luke's Church. He died on July 16, 1951.

=== Consecrators ===
- Henry S. Tucker, 19th Presiding Bishop of the Episcopal Church USA
- Frank A. Juhan
- Richard B. Mitchell

John Walker was the 434th bishop consecrated in the Episcopal Church.

== See Also... ==
- Episcopal Diocese of Atlanta
- List of Bishop Succession in the Episcopal Church

Episcopal Church (USA) titles
Preceded by Henry J. Mikell	3rd Bishop of Atlanta; 1942–1951	Succeeded by John B. Walthour
