= Frank Allan (bishop) =

American bishop (1935–2019)

The Right Reverend Frank Kellogg Allan D.D., D. Min.
- Bishop of Atlanta
- Church: Episcopal Church
- Diocese: Atlanta
- In office: 1989–2000
- Predecessor: C. Judson Child Jr.
- Successor: J. Neil Alexander
- Previous post: Coadjutor Bishop of Atlanta (1987-1989)

Orders
- Ordination: December 16, 1959 by Randolph Claiborne
- Consecration: February 7, 1987 by Edmond L. Browning

Personal details
- Born: May 9, 1935 Hammond, Indiana, U.S.
- Died: May 24, 2019 (aged 84) Atlanta, Georgia, U.S.
- Buried: Decatur Cemetery
- Denomination: Anglican
- Parents: Bryan Allan & Julia Allan
- Spouse: Elizabeth Trice Ansley
- Children: 4
- Education: Emory University

Frank Kellogg Allan (May 9, 1935 – May 24, 2019) was the eighth bishop of the Episcopal Diocese of Atlanta from 1989 till 2000.

== Background ==
Allan was born in Hammond, Indiana. He graduated from Emory University in 1956, and in 1959 he received his Master of Divinity from the University of the South in Sewanee, Tennessee.

Allan was ordained as deacon and later as priest by Bishop Randolph R. Claiborne Jr. in 1959, and served at St. Mark's Episcopal Church in Dalton, Georgia, for eight years. In 1967 Allan became rector of St. Paul's Episcopal Church in Macon, Georgia, where he served until 1977. Allan's time at St. Paul's coincided with rising political consciousness: he once delivered a sermon on women's rights that was interrupted and denounced by a woman in the congregation for its progressive stand; he later said that from that time on he never began a sermon without expecting to be interrupted. From St. Paul's, Allan went to St. Anne's Episcopal Church in Atlanta.

In 1987 Bishop C. Judson Child consecrated Allan as Bishop Coadjutor for the Diocese of Atlanta. When Bishop Child retired, Bishop Allan became Bishop of Atlanta per the Constitution and Canons of the Episcopal Church (1989). He was consecrated as Coadjutor Bishop on February 7, 1987, and became diocesan bishop on January 1, 1989.

After retiring, Bishop Allan taught at the Candler School of Theology at Emory University. He also began a ministry called the Work of Our Hands to provide arts and crafts to under-served communities. Bishop Allan is remembered for his supportive role in the ordination of women in the diocese.

=== Consecrators ===
- Edmond Lee Browning, 24th Presiding Bishop
- Charles Judson Child, Jr., 7th Bishop of Atlanta
- William Evan Sanders, 1st Bishop of East Tennessee
- Bennett Jones Sims, 6th Bishop of Atlanta

Frank K. Allan was the 818th bishop consecrated in the Episcopal Church.

== See also ==
- Episcopal Diocese of Atlanta
- Historical list of bishops of the Episcopal Church in the United States of America

Episcopal Church (USA) titles
Preceded by C. Judson Child, Jr.	8th Bishop of Atlanta; January 1, 1989 – 2000	Succeeded by J. Neil Alexander
