= David Collins =

David Collins may refer to:

== Arts and entertainment ==
=== Fictional characters ===
- David Collins (Dark Shadows), character in the television series Dark Shadows
- David Collins (EastEnders), character in the television series EastEnders

=== People ===
- David Collins (producer) (born 1967), American producer
- David Collins, Irish film producer of Cairo Time
- Dave Collins (radio personality) (born 1962), British radio DJ
- David Collins (comedian) (born 1969), member of the Australian duo The Umbilical Brothers
- Dave Collins (sound engineer), American mastering engineer
- Dave and Ansell Collins, Jamaican vocal/instrumental duo

== Sports ==
=== Association football ===
- David Collins (footballer, born 1971), Irish footballer
- David Collins (I-Kiribati politician) (born 1972), I-Kiribati footballer and politician
- David Collins (Scottish footballer) (1912–?)

=== Other sports ===
- David Collins (Australian footballer) (born 1946), Australian rules footballer
- David Collins (Hampshire cricketer), 18th-century cricketer
- David Collins (New Zealand cricketer) (1887–1967)
- Dave Collins (baseball) (born 1952), American baseball player
- David Collins (hurler) (born 1984), Irish hurler
- David Collins (rower) (born 1969), American rower

== Others ==
- David Collins (I-Kiribati politician) (born 1972)
- David Collins (lieutenant governor) (1756–1810)
- David Collins (educational administrator) (1949–2019)
- David Collins (interior designer) (1955–2013)
- David Collins (judge) (born 1954)
- David Collins, former Canadian ambassador to Romania
- David Collins (priest) (1922–2016), dean of the cathedral of St. Philip (Atlanta), 1966–1984
- David Jarrett Collins (1936–2022), American inventor and businessman known for work with barcodes
