= Diocese of Atlanta =

Diocese of Atlanta may refer to:

- the Episcopal Diocese of Atlanta
- the Roman Catholic Archdiocese of Atlanta (Diocese of Atlanta, 1956–1962)
