= Suite bretonne (Dupré) =

- by Marcel Dupré
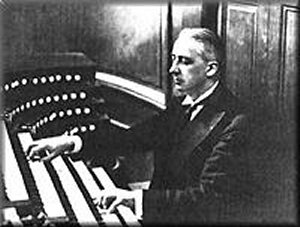
- Dupré at the organ
- Opus: 21
- Year: 1923
- Published: 1924 - Paris
- Publisher: Alphonse Leduc
- Duration: 13 minutes
- Movements: 3
- Scoring: Organ

Suite bretonne (from French, Breton Suite), Op. 21, is a suite for solo organ by French composer Marcel Dupré.

== Background ==
The Suite bretonne was written at an uncertain time around 1923 and was dedicated to mademoiselle Hilda Gélis-Didot, a close friend of the Dupré family and a relative of the Firmin Didot family, long associated with publications of the Institut de France. Organist Graham Steed suggests the suite was written in the United States, as the third movement uses chimes instead of the flûte registration in the organ, suggesting he was familiar with registrations in American organs. It premiered in 1923 in New York City and was published in Paris in 1924, by Alphonse Leduc.

== Structure ==
The suite is divided into three movements and scored for solo organ. It has an approximate total duration of 13 minutes. The following is a list of movements:

1. Berceuse. Lento
2. Fileuse. Vif
3. Les cloches de Perros-Guirec. Très modéré

The first movement represents a cradle song which uses a largely chromatic language in the melody and harmonies and is supported by an ostinato. The second movement represents a woman spinning wool, and the third movement portrays Breton villagers walking to church in step with the sound of bells in this small coastal town of Perros-Guirec between Brest and Saint-Malo

== Recordings ==
It is not uncommon for organists to perform individual movements from this suite in their recordings. Dupré himself recorded the first movement on June 18, 1929, in the Queen's Hall, in London. The following is a list of complete recordings of this piece:

Recordings of Dupré's Suite Bretonne
Organ	Date of recording	Place of recording	Label
Jeremy Filsell	September 1998	St Boniface Episcopal Church, Sarasota, Florida, USA	Guild
Robert Delcamp	September 1999	Cathedral of St. Philip, Atlanta, Georgia, USA	Naxos
