= John B. Walthour =

American bishop

The Right Reverend John Buckman Walthour D.D.
- Bishop of Atlanta
- Church: Episcopal Church
- Diocese: Atlanta
- Elected: October 9, 1951
- In office: 1952
- Predecessor: John M. Walker
- Successor: Randolph Claiborne

Orders
- Ordination: July 1931 by Frederick F. Reese
- Consecration: January 9, 1952 by Henry Knox Sherrill

Personal details
- Born: August 24, 1904 Cape May, New Jersey, United States
- Died: October 29, 1952 (aged 48) Atlanta, Georgia, United States
- Buried: West Point Cemetery
- Denomination: Anglican
- Parents: Henry Clayton Walthour & Helen Millward Buckman
- Spouse: Margaret Simkins Baker (m. 1931)
- Education: Cornell University

John Buckman Walthour (August 24, 1904 – October 29, 1952) was the 4th bishop of the Episcopal Diocese of Atlanta in the United States.

== Background ==
He was born 24 August 1904 in Cape May, New Jersey, the son of Harry Clayton and Helen Millward Walthour. Frederick F. Reese, the Bishop of Georgia ordained Walthour as deacon and priest in 1931. On 21 October 1931 he married Margaret Simkins Baker.

He was called to Grace Church in Waycross, Georgia, remaining there only briefly before being called to St. Andrew's Church in Tampa, Florida. From 1941 to 1947, he served as chaplain at United States Military Academy, West Point. In 1947, Walthour was called to be Dean of the Cathedral of St. Philip in Atlanta, Georgia.

He was consecrated Bishop in 1952 and died within his first year.

=== Consecrators ===
- Henry Knox Sherrill, 20th Presiding Bishop of the Episcopal Church USA
- Edwin A. Penick
- Oliver J. Hart

John Walthour was the 511th bishop consecrated in the Episcopal Church.

== See also ==
- Episcopal Diocese of Atlanta
- Historical list of bishops of the Episcopal Church in the United States of America

Episcopal Church (USA) titles
Preceded by John Moore Walker, Jr.	4th Bishop of Atlanta; 1952 – 1952	Succeeded by Randolph R. Claiborne, Jr.
