= Episcopal Cathedral of Saint Philip (Atlanta) =

Cathedral of Saint Philip
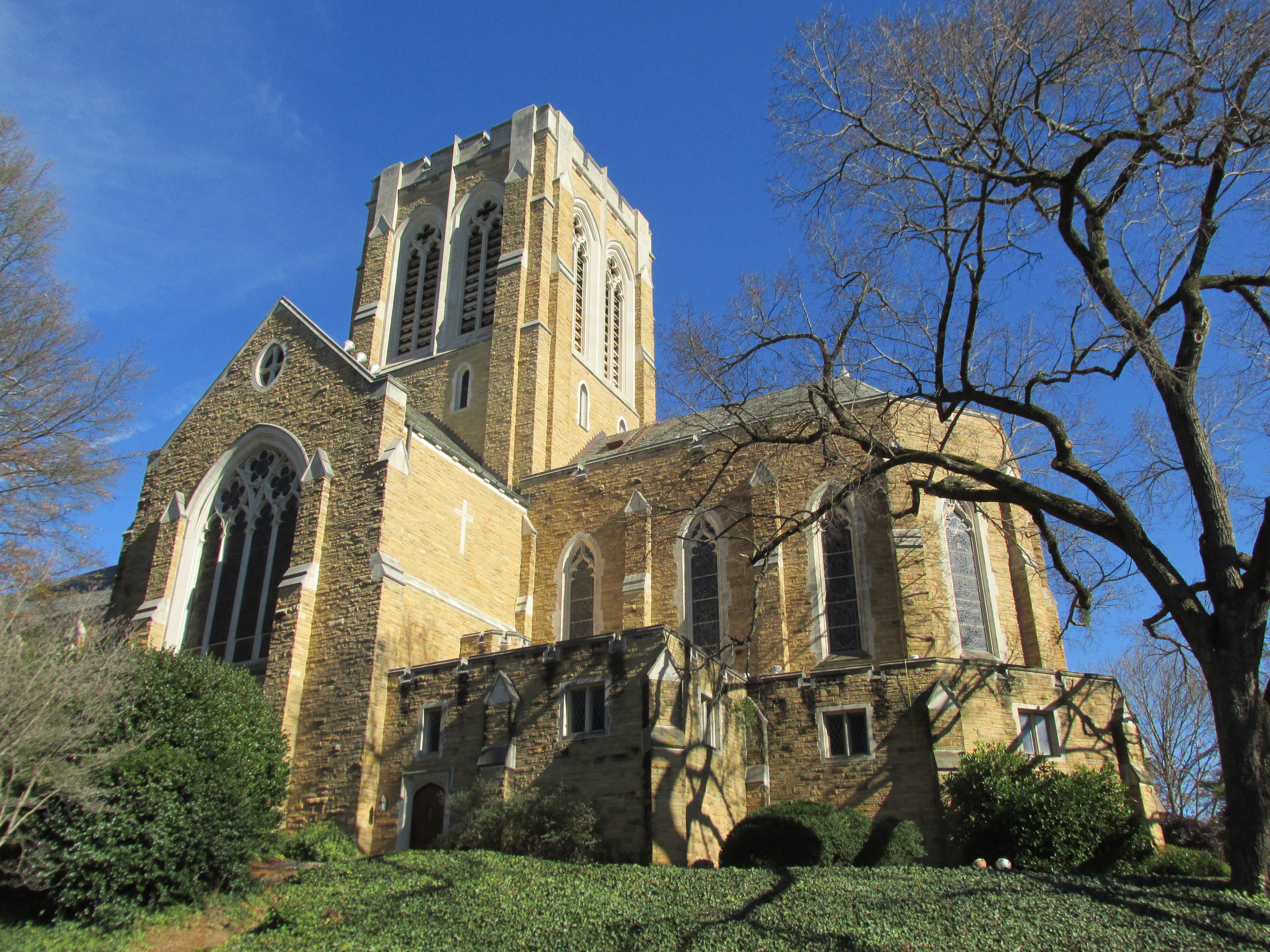
- The cathedral in 2013

- Location in Atlanta
- 33°49′51″N 84°23′14″W
- Location: 2744 Peachtree Road NW; Atlanta, Georgia
- Country: United States
- Denomination: Episcopal Church
- Website: cathedralatl.org

History
- Founded: 1848
- Consecrated: 1980

Architecture
- Architect: Francis Palmer Smith
- Style: Gothic Revival
- Groundbreaking: 1933
- Completed: 1962

Specifications
- Materials: Limestone

Administration
- Diocese: Atlanta

Clergy
- Bishop: Rob Wright
- Vicar(s): The Rev. George M. Maxwell, Jr.
- Dean: The Very Rev. Samuel G. Candler

The Cathedral of Saint Philip, also known as St. Philip's Cathedral or St. Philip's is an Episcopal cathedral in the U.S. State of Georgia, in the City of Atlanta. Located on Peachtree Road in Buckhead (Atlanta) at what is popularly called "Jesus Junction". St. Philip's has become one of the largest Episcopal congregations in the United States, with a membership of approximately 7,000. St. Philip's is named in honor of St. Philip the Evangelist, a deacon in the early Christian Church. The Cathedral of St. Philip is the seat of the Episcopal Diocese of Atlanta.

== History of the Cathedral ==
=== Original cathedral in downtown Atlanta ===
The first site for St. Philip's was in downtown Atlanta, across from the State Capitol on the corner of what is now Washington Street and Martin Luther King Drive. By 1875 the small church had grown to be the largest Episcopal church in Georgia, and in 1907 St. Philip's was named the cathedral of the Diocese of Atlanta, which was formed that same year. In 1928 the cathedral selected Raimundo de Ovies as its new dean and began work on selecting a site for construction of a new cathedral.

=== Move to Buckhead ===
In 1933, St. Philip's relocated to its present site at 2744 Peachtree Road NW. A gray wooden structure known as the pro-cathedral was erected and served the congregation as its house of worship while construction was begun on the cathedral. Mikell Chapel was completed in 1947, followed by De Ovies Memorial Hall in 1951. The year 1955 saw the completion of the Hall of Bishops, now renamed as Child Hall. In 1962, the cathedral was completed and dedicated. The architect for most of the structures was Francis Palmer Smith in cooperation with Ayers and Goodwin. It was consecrated to the glory of God in 1980. In 2004, St. Philip's engaged in a renovation of all existing structures and the addition of a large new wing north of De Ovies Memorial Hall as well as adding a glass atrium enclosing the former open-air courtyard adjacent to the Narthex.

=== Previous Deans of the Cathedral ===
- 1893–1904: Albion W. Knight
- 1905–1914: Charles T.A. Pike
- 1914–1915: John T. Atkinson
- 1916-1928: Thomas H. Johnston
- 1928-1946: Raimundo de Ovies
- 1947-1951: John B. Walthour
- 1952-1965: Alfred Hardman
- 1966-1984: David Collins
- 1986-1997: John Sanders

== Current buildings on campus ==
- Mikell Chapel (built in 1947), named after Henry J. Mikell, Bishop of Atlanta.
- De Ovies Hall (built in 1951), named after Raimundo de Ovies, Dean emeritus of the Cathedral
- Hall of Bishops (built in 1955), renamed "Child Hall" after C. Judson Child Jr., Bishop of Atlanta
- Cathedral (built in 1962)
- Good Faith Chapel (under construction since 2024)

== Canons & Clergy ==
- The Very Rev. Samuel G. Candler: Dean
- Dale Adelmann, Ph.D.: Canon for Music
- The Rev. Salmoon Bashir: Canon for Liturgy and Ecumenism
- The Rev. David Boyd: Canon for Pastoral Care
- The Rev. Ashley Carr: Canon for Parish Life
- The Rev. George M. Maxwell, Jr.: Vicar
- The Rev. Julia Mitchener: Canon for Mission
- The Rev. Deacon Linda Rosengren
- The Rev. Juan Sandoval: Deacon for Hispanic Ministries and Pastoral Care
- The Rev. Thee Smith, Ph.D: Priest Associate

== Parochial entities ==
Owing to the size of membership the cathedral is able to offer a large array of parochial entities:

The Cathedral Bookstore, established in 1949 by the Episcopal Church Women, serves the Cathedral of St. Philip, the Diocese of Atlanta and the community at large. They offer books, gifts, music and more, religious and secular, for adults and children.

The Cathedral Thrift House was established in 1949 by the Episcopal Church Women. The mission of this cathedral entity is to provide a source where people can purchase quality clothing, decorative home accessories, housewares and books at very moderate prices. The Thrift House has non-profit 501c-3 status. Currently located at 1893 Piedmont Road NE, Atlanta, GA 30324, and open Monday through Saturday, 10 a.m. to 4:30 p.m.

Cathedral Giving by Design, a major outreach project sponsored by the Episcopal Church Women of the cathedral, is a festival of the decorative arts held annually to benefit a designated charity. The Cathedral of St. Philip receives no funding from Cathedral Giving by Design In addition to dealer booths offering antiques in a wide range of styles and prices, the Antiques Show includes two tours of homes, a preview party, a flower festival, and talks and book signings by leading interior designers, architects, and authors. Since its inception in 1969, the Antiques Show has raised more than $5 million for Atlanta-area nonprofits.

The Cathedral Farmer's Market, known also as the Peachtree Road Farmers Market, was founded in 2007 as a joint project between Gina and Linton Hopkins (of Restaurant Eugene, H&F Bread Co., H&F Bottle Shop, and Holeman & Finch Public House) and the Cathedral of St. Philip.

The Cathedral Preschool started as a weekday playgroup that was established in 1970 by mothers who volunteered to be teachers. The Cathedral Playgroup grew into what is now The Cathedral Preschool - a professionally staffed, highly regarded Atlanta preschool with a waiting list of applicants.

The Cathedral Counseling Center is a ministry of the Cathedral of St. Philip, offering counseling and pastoral care to individuals, couples, families, and groups.

The Cathedral Towers, Inc., established in 1972, are Mid-Rise Residences for Senior Community • Age 62+ • Subsidized Housing Equal Housing Opportunity A non-profit corporation sponsored by: The Cathedral of St. Philip.

Friends of Cathedral Music provides sacred music concerts and financial support to the cathedral's music in worship. The annual recital series is renowned for bringing world-class musicians to Atlanta including David Daniels, St. Paul's Cathedral, London, and numerous English college choirs all in the last few years.

== Worship Schedule ==
Regular Weekly Schedule
Sunday	Monday - Thursday	Friday
7:45am: Holy Eucharist (Held in Mikell Chapel without music) 8:45am: Holy Eucharist 11:15am: Holy Eucharist 11:15am: Holy Eucharist (Held in Spanish in Mikell Chapel) 4:00pm: Choral Evensong & Holy Eucharist (Offered September-May)	12:15pm: Holy Eucharist	12:15pm: Holy Eucharist & Healing

== See also ==
- List of the Episcopal cathedrals of the United States
- List of cathedrals in the United States
- List of cathedrals
