= J. Neil Alexander =

American Bishop of the Episcopal Church

The Right Reverend John Neil Alexander
- Bishop of Atlanta
- Church: Episcopal Church
- Diocese: Atlanta
- Elected: March 31, 2001
- In office: 2001–2012
- Predecessor: Frank Allan
- Successor: Rob Wright
- Other posts: Dean of School of Theology, Sewanee (2012-2020)

Orders
- Ordination: 1988 by G. P. Mellick Belshaw
- Consecration: July 7, 2001 by Frank Griswold

Personal details
- Born: January 23, 1954 (age 72) Winston-Salem, North Carolina, United States
- Denomination: Anglican (prev. Lutheran)
- Spouse: Lynn Tesh Alexander
- Children: 3

John Neil Alexander (born January 23, 1954) is a bishop and the Custodian of the Standard Book of Common Prayer in The Episcopal Church. He is Professor of Liturgy, Emeritus, and Quintard Professor of Theology, Emeritus, in the School of Theology of the University of the South, Sewanee, Tennessee. He served as dean of the School of Theology at the University of the South from 2012 to 2020, and is Dean Emeritus. From 2001 to 2012, he was the 9th Bishop of the Episcopal Diocese of Atlanta.

== Background ==
Alexander was born in 1954 in Winston-Salem, North Carolina. In 1976 he married Lynn Tesh Alexander, a pediatric nurse practitioner. They are the parents of three adult children, John, Kelly, and Mary Catherine and grandparents of three grandsons and a granddaughter.

He graduated from Moravian College in 1976 with a B.A. degree in Music. In 1979, he obtained a M.Mus. degree from the University of South Carolina. In 1980, Alexander earned a M.Div. degree from the Lutheran Theological Southern Seminary, and was ordained by the North Carolina Synod of the Lutheran Church in America, first pastoring Faith Lutheran Church in Murray Hill, New Jersey.

From 1984 to 1987, Alexander taught Liturgics and Spirituality and was Dean of Keffer Memorial Chapel at Waterloo Lutheran Seminary in Ontario, Canada. In 1987, he joined the faculty at The General Theological Seminary in New York City as Assistant Professor of Preaching and Director of the Chapel, later teaching liturgics as well. He was ordained as a deacon and then priest in the Episcopal Church in 1988 by New Jersey Bishop Mellick Belshaw. He received a Th.D. degree from The General Seminary in Liturgics in 1993, where he became the Trinity Church Professor of Liturgics and Preaching. While at General, he served in a variety of parish settings in the metropolitan New York area. In 1997, he was named the Norma and Olin Mills Professor of Divinity at the School of Theology at the University of the South in Sewanee, Tennessee where he taught both liturgics and homiletics. Alexander was elected and ordained bishop of Atlanta in 2001, and was nominated for Presiding Bishop of the Episcopal Church in 2006. The Rt. Rev. Katharine Jefferts-Schori was elected, the first woman to hold the position. As the bishop of an owning diocese of the University of the South, he served as chancellor from 2009 to 2012.

On February 8, 2011, Alexander announced that he would step down as bishop of Atlanta in the fall of 2012 after the election of his successor. In 2012, he returned to the University of the South, as Dean of the School of Theology, Professor of Liturgy, and Charles Todd Quintard Professor of Theology. In November 2019 it was announced that he would step down as Dean in August 2020, but continue as Professor of Liturgy and Quintard Professor.

He has also taught at Candler School of Theology, Drew University, and Yale Divinity School. He was created a Companion of the Roll of Honour of the Memorial of Merit of King Charles the Martyr in 2019.

=== Consecrators ===
- Frank Tracy Griswold, 25th Presiding Bishop of the Episcopal Church USA
- Frank Kellogg Allan, 8th bishop of Atlanta
- Charles Judson Child, Jr., 7th bishop of Atlanta

J. Neil Alexander was the 968th bishop consecrated in the Episcopal Church.

== Publications ==
Bishop Alexander is the author and editor of a number of publications in the fields of liturgics, homiletics, sacramental theology, and pastoral practice, including a number of his sermons.

- Celebrating Liturgical Time: Days, Weeks, and Seasons (Church Publishing, 2014) ISBN 9780898698732
- This Far by Grace: A Bishop's Journey Through Questions of Homosexuality (Cowley Publications, 2003) ISBN 9781561012244
- (editor) With Ever Joyful Hearts: Essays on Liturgy and Music Honoring Marion J. Hatchett (Church Publishing, 1999) ISBN 9780898693218
- Waiting for the Coming: The Liturgical Meaning of Advent, Christmas, and Epiphany (Pastoral Press, 1993) ISBN 9781569290118
- Time and Community: Studies in Liturgical History and Theology (Pastoral Press, 1990) ISBN 9780912405667

== See also ==
- Episcopal Diocese of Atlanta
- Historical list of bishops of the Episcopal Church in the United States of America

Episcopal Church (USA) titles
Preceded by Frank K. Allan	9th Bishop of Atlanta; July 7, 2001-October 14, 2012	Succeeded by Robert C. Wright
