= C. Judson Child Jr. =

American bishop

The Right Reverend Charles Judson Child D.D.
- Bishop of Atlanta
- Church: Episcopal Church
- Diocese: Atlanta
- Elected: June 25, 1983
- In office: 1983–1988
- Predecessor: Bennett J. Sims
- Successor: Frank Allan
- Previous post: Suffragan Bishop of Atlanta (1978-1983)

Orders
- Ordination: March 1, 1948 by Benjamin M. Washburn
- Consecration: February 18, 1978 by John Allin

Personal details
- Born: April 25, 1923 North Bergen, New Jersey, United States
- Died: January 5, 2004 (aged 80) Atlanta, Georgia, United States
- Denomination: Anglican
- Parents: Charles Judson Child and Alice Sylvia Sparling
- Education: Sewanee: The University of the South

Charles Judson Child Jr. (April 25, 1923 – January 5, 2004) was the seventh bishop of the Episcopal Diocese of Atlanta. He was consecrated as Bishop Suffragan in 1978, and served as diocesan bishop from 1983 to 1989.

== Early life ==
Judson Child was born on April 25, 1923, in North Bergen, New Jersey. In 1944, he graduated from the University of the South in Sewanee, Tennessee. He later attended the School of Theology at the same institution and, in 1947, received his Master of Divinity.

== Career ==
On February 2, 1947, Child was made a deacon by Benjamin M. Washburn, Bishop of Newark, New Jersey. On March 1, 1948, Washburn ordained Child as a priest. From 1947 to 1951, Child served as assistant to the rector of St Paul's Church, Paterson, New Jersey. In 1951, he became rector of St Bartholomew's Church, Ho-Ho-Kus, New Jersey.

In 1967, having served sixteen years in Ho-Ho-Kus, Child took a post as Canon Pastor at St. Philip's Cathedral in Atlanta, Georgia. In 1978, he was elected Bishop Suffragan, serving with Bennett Sims. Upon Sims' retirement, Child was elected diocesan bishop. He was installed in 1983 and retired in 1989. Renowned for his quick wit, open heart, and grand sense of humor, Child continued to be well loved and active in the diocese well after his retirement until his death on January 5, 2004.

=== Consecrators ===
- John Allin, 23rd Presiding Bishop of the Episcopal Church
- Bennett Sims, 6th Bishop of Atlanta
- Randolph Claiborne, 5th Bishop of Atlanta

C. Judson Child was the 723rd bishop consecrated in the Episcopal Church.

== See also ==
- Historical list of bishops of the Episcopal Church in the United States of America

Episcopal Church (USA) titles
Preceded by Bennett Sims	7th Bishop of Atlanta; 1983–1988	Succeeded by Frank Allan
