= David Collins (priest) =

Episcopal Bishop

The Very Reverend David Browning Collins
- Predecessor: Alfred Hardman
- Successor: John Sanders

Orders
- Ordination: 1948

Personal details
- Born: December 18, 1922
- Died: December 29, 2016 (aged 94)
- Spouse: Maryon Virginia Moise
- Children: Melissa Collins, Matthew Collins, Christopher Collins, Geoffrey Collins
- Education: University of the South

The Very Reverend David Browning Collins (December 18, 1922 — December 29, 2016) was an Episcopal priest, serving in various positions of leadership in the Episcopal church, including as the president of the House of Deputies and as the dean of the Episcopal Cathedral of St. Philip in Atlanta, Georgia

== Background ==
David Collins was born on December 18, 1922, in Hot Springs, Arkansas. He graduated from the University of the South in 1943 and served in the United States Navy from 1943 to 1946, stationed at the Brooklyn Naval Yard, and the United States Navy Reserve from 1946 to 1960. He came back to the University of the South as Chaplain and associate professor of religion, during which time he obtained his Master of Sacred Theology degree (1962) and, later, his Doctorate of Divinity (1974). In 1996, he published an autobiography entitled There is a Lad Here. He died on December 29, 2016, at the age of 94.

== Involvement in the Episcopal Church ==
David B. Collins was ordained as a deacon in 1948, and as a priest in 1949, during which time he served as the rector of St. Andrew's Church in Marianna, Arkansas. Following his ordination, he served as priest-in-charge of the Holy Cross Church in West Memphis, Arkansas (1949–1953). In 1966, he became the dean of the Episcopal Cathedral of St. Philip, and served there until 1984, when he left to become the president of the House of Deputies. He kept this position until 1991. During his time at the Cathedral of St. Philip, he held prominent positions on the national level of the Episcopal Church, serving on the Presiding Bishop's Advisory Committee on Evangelism and Renewal, he Church Deployment Board and the Church Pension Fund board of trustees. He also chaired the committee addressing women's ordination during the 1976 General Convention, and was the vice president of the House of Deputies from 1979 to 1985.

== See also ==
- Episcopal Cathedral of St. Philip (Atlanta)
- Episcopal Church (United States)
- Episcopal Diocese of Atlanta
