= Middleton S. Barnwell =

American bishop (1882–1957)

The Right Reverend Middleton Barnwell D.D.
- Bishop of Georgia
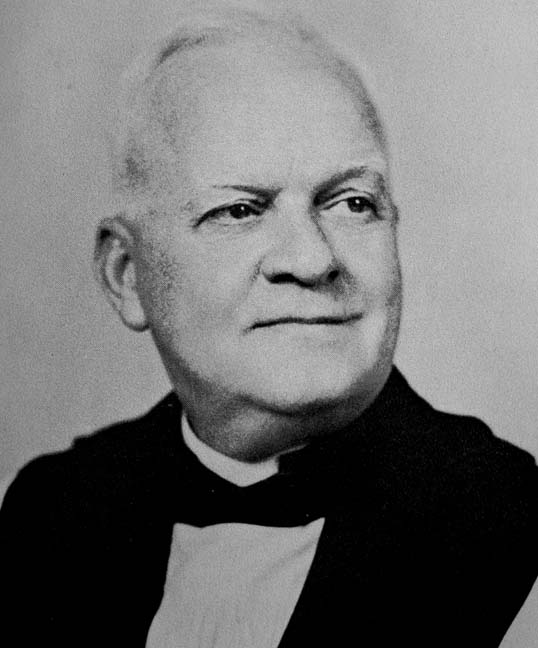
- The Rt. Rev. Middleton S. Barnwell when Bishop of Georgia
- Church: Episcopal Church
- Diocese: Georgia
- Elected: February 25, 1935
- In office: 1936–1954
- Predecessor: Frederick F. Reese
- Successor: Albert Stuart
- Previous posts: Bishop of Idaho (1925–1935); Coadjutor Bishop of Georgia (1935-1936)

Orders
- Ordination: December 1908 by Charles E. Woodcock
- Consecration: December 30, 1925 by Ethelbert Talbot

Personal details
- Born: September 9, 1882 Louisville, Kentucky, United States
- Died: May 6, 1957 (aged 74) Savannah, Georgia, United States
- Buried: Bonaventure Cemetery
- Denomination: Anglican
- Parents: Stephen Elliott Barnwell & Elizabeth Cleland
- Spouse: Margaret Thorne Lighthall

Middleton Stuart Barnwell (September 9, 1882 – May 6, 1957) was the seventh Bishop of the Episcopal Diocese of Idaho and the fifth Bishop of the Episcopal Diocese of Georgia. Barnwell was the 349th bishop of the Episcopal Church in the United States of America. He was also the first president of what is now Boise State University.

== Life ==
Middleton S. Barnwell was born September 9, 1882, in Louisville, Kentucky. He was graduated from Centre College in Danville, Kentucky, with an associate degree and earned his Bachelor's in Divinity and later honorary doctorate from the Episcopal Virginia Theological Seminary. Barnwell served as the assistant rector at Christ Chapel in Baltimore in 1909. In 1911, he became rector of St. Andrew's Church in New Bedford, Massachusetts. While serving St. Andrew's, Barnwell married Margaret Thorne Lighthall (1889–1960).

He worked at the Church of the Advent in Birmingham, Alabama, from 1913 to 1923. Barnwell then became field secretary to the Protestant Episcopal Church and then was consecrated Bishop of Idaho in 1925.

During this time in the late 1920s and early 1930s, Bishop Barnwell ran St. Margaret's School, a secondary girls' academy in Boise, Idaho. With the Depression, more girls began to attend public school. Bishop Barnwell advocated that the academy become a junior college so that local high school graduates could begin their college education without out-of-state costs. In February, 1932, he began working to form a junior college out of St. Margaret's. While he found no local support, Barnwell did secure funding from The Episcopal Church. September 6, 1932, Boise Junior College opened its doors to about 75 students and fourteen faculty members (eight of whom were full-time). He told its first graduates,

All achievement begins in vision and continues through labor and through faith which is the most misunderstood word in the English language. Faith is not believing something you can't prove, faith is seeing something which is as yet invisible. And that's the sort of faith which we began this school.

Bishop Barnwell served as the college's president from 1932 until 1934. At that time he recommended that Boise Junior College become a public institution. The school is now Boise State University.

Barnwell had served in as Bishop of Idaho for nearly a decade when the call for a bishop coadjutor went out from the Diocese of Georgia. The election of a successor to Bishop F. F. Reese took two conventions to be decided. On August 30, 1934, a special convention was held at Grace Church, Waycross and failed in twelve ballots to elect a new bishop. A second session met January 15, 1935 at St. Paul's, Augusta and took nine more ballots to elect Barnwell as the fifth Bishop of the Diocese of Georgia.

At the time of his election, there were 16 parishes, 21 organized missions, 13 unorganized missions, five mission stations and one parochial mission. The still segregated church records noted 5,391 white and 1,029 black communicants. During his tenure as bishop, which lasted until 1954 the Diocese grew to 8,156 total communicants with two more churches becoming parishes and four additional missions created.

On the 10th year of his consecration as bishop of Georgia, he told the Diocese

The happiest and most useful relationship for a Bishop or Priest is that of Friend to his people. It means trust—and service—and love. And beyond this there is nothing else.

He served as Bishop of Georgia from 1936 to 1954.

On the occasion of his retirement he said of serving as bishop that a bishop needed, "robust health and a good driving ability" and for a large diocese like Georgia one should be "either celibate, or a man who is very unhappily married...for he will live on the highway." He went on to speak of "relentless weekends" visiting the scattered churches of the Diocese and "in between he tries to make friends with his wife and others who live in his home town." He died in Savannah on May 6, 1957. Bishop Barnwell and his wife Maggie had no children. She died in 1960. The couple is buried at Savannah's Bonaventure cemetery.

He was succeeded by Albert R. Stuart as Bishop of Georgia.

== References and sources ==
- The Episcopal Church in Georgia 1733–1957, by Henry Thompson Malone published by The Protestant Episcopal Church in the Diocese of Atlanta, 1960
