= St. Andrew's Episcopal Church (Birmingham, Alabama) =

Historic church in Alabama, United States

- Saint Andrew's Episcopal Church
- U.S. National Register of Historic Places
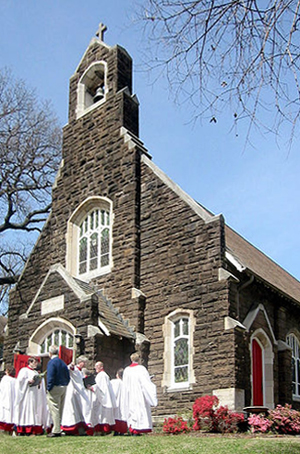
- St. Andrews on Palm Sunday, 2002

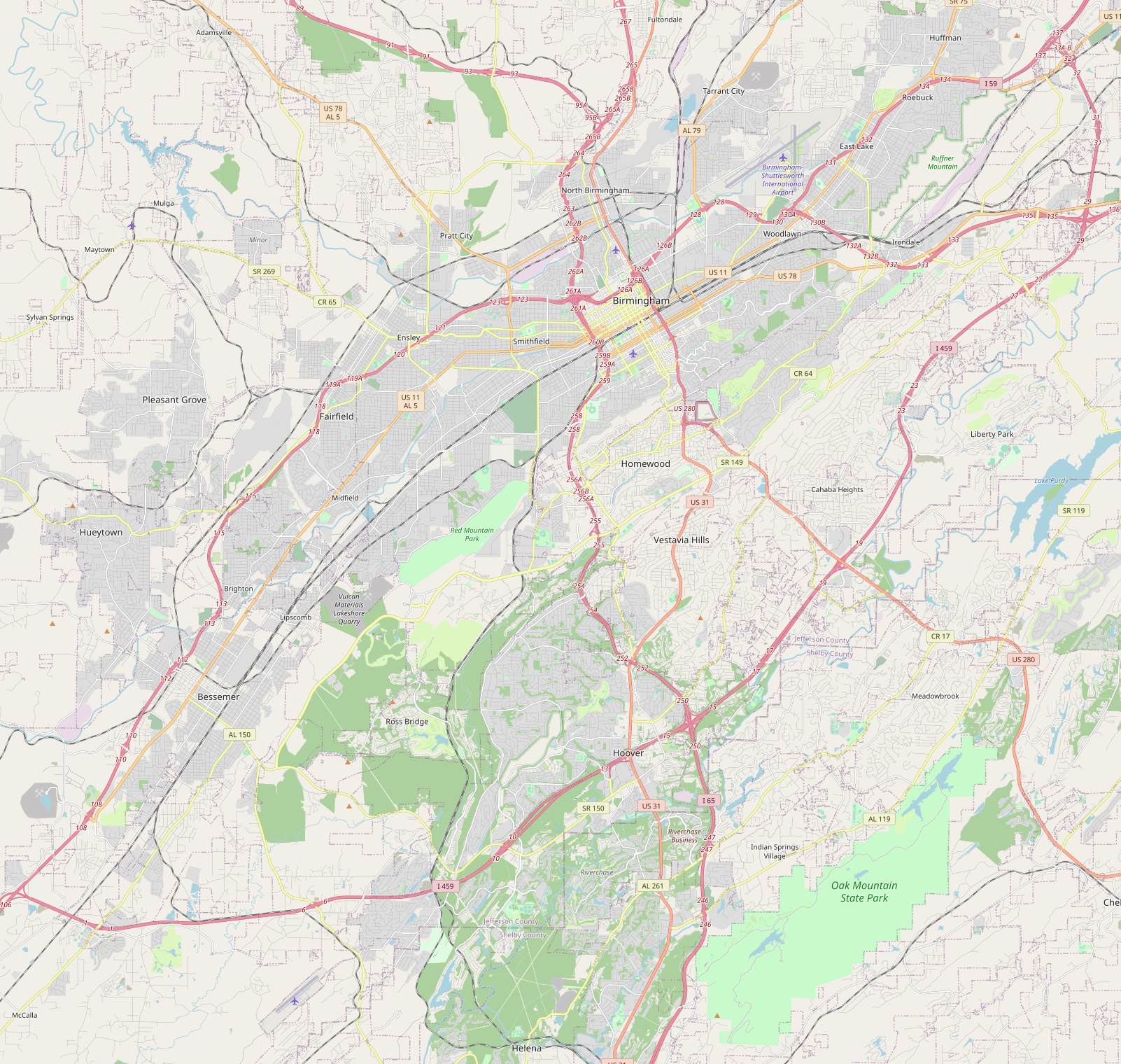
- Location within Birmingham, Alabama Location within Alabama Location within the United States
- Location: 1164 Eleventh Ave. S, Birmingham, Alabama
- Coordinates: 33°29′43.67″N 86°48′27.84″W
- Built: 1915
- NRHP reference No.: 86001959
- Added to NRHP: August 28, 1986

St. Andrew's Episcopal Church in Birmingham, Alabama, is a parish church of the Episcopal Diocese of Alabama.

St. Andrew's was founded in 1902 as a church school for children who could not get to the downtown Church of the Advent on Sunday. In the following year, the mission was expanded to include Sunday services. A site was acquired and a small church built; the first service was held on Easter, 1905. In December of that year, the parish was incorporated; it was admitted to full parochial rights at the Diocesan Convention of 1906. The original church building, a few blocks from the present church, was destroyed by a tornado in March, 1913. The parish had been considering a new building further up Red Mountain; now they had to act. The present site, at the corner of Eleventh Avenue and Twelfth Street South, was acquired and the cornerstone laid by Bishop Charles Beckwith on St. Andrew's Day, November 30, 1913. The current building was first used at Easter, 1915.

Soon after St. Andrew's was established, the rector Raimundo de Ovies, teamed up with The Rev. Carl Henckell, pastor of All Saints Church, to found Holy Innocents Hospital for Children (later Children's Hospital of Alabama). The hospital was founded in 1911 and originally operated under the auspices of the Episcopal Diocese of Alabama.

From that time until after World War II, St. Andrew's remained an ordinary medium-sized parish serving the immediate neighborhood. It was not particularly noticeable for its outreach or services. The parish, made up mainly of small business people and some professionals, was hit hard by the Great Depression. The expansion of the city over the mountain, begun in the 1930s and heightened after 1945, drained some of the traditional base of membership.

However, another change had begun which was to give St. Andrew's a special character and a unique place in the Diocese of Alabama. Beginning in a small way in the early 1940s, St. Andrew's gradually became an Anglo-Catholic parish with an emphasis on the celebration of the Eucharist and on traditional ceremonies and liturgy. Father Robert Yancey Marlow (priest from 1951 to 1959) strengthened the “high” church profile of the church, as did Fr. Robert Woodfield and Fr. Bruce Wirtz.

As this Anglo-Catholic parish, St. Andrew's often led the way in Alabama in liturgical innovation and experimentation. The “bells and smells” of ancient practice have been combined with the contemporary language of the 1979 Book of Common Prayer and increasing lay participation in all aspects of parish life. These liturgical elements have attracted new parishioners to St. Andrew's, but an equal attraction has been its outreach ministry.

Since the 1960s, this parish has addressed the issue of racial exclusion in the Episcopal Church, advocated the consecration of women priests, welcomed gay and lesbian members, supported ministry to the University of Alabama at Birmingham, established a soup kitchen (which became Community Kitchens) with the efforts of Fr. Maurice Branscomb, provided group homes for the mentally challenged through the St. Andrew's Foundation fostered by Fr. Francis Walter, ministered to people with AIDS/HIV, offered literacy training for adults, and produced the Red Door Arts workshops and concert series.

A new parish hall was built and dedicated on Epiphany, 1989. After a million dollar capital campaign in 2000, the church itself was historically restored and new roofs were put on the parish hall and church under the charge of Fr. Marc Burnette. The parish sent a record number of people to seminary from 2005 to 2013, including Robyn Arnold, Geoff Evans, Jeff Evans, Seth Olson, Bentley Manning, and Tommie Watkins.

St. Andrew's has had a number of rectors, including:

Raimundo de Ovies 1905 - 1912

Willis Gaylord Clark 1912 - 1915

Wilmer Smith Poyner 1916 - 1918

Joseph Todhunter Ware 1918 - 1925

Vernon Cochrane McMaster 1925 - 1934

Capers Satterlee 1935 - 1939

James William Brettman 1939 - 1944

Conrad William Myrick 1945 - 1951

Robert Yancey Marlow 1951 - 1959

Robert Charles Woodfield 1960 - 1963

Wallace Bruce Wirtz 1963 - 1970

William Maurice Branscomb 1971 - 1984

Francis Xavier Walter 1985 - 1999

William Marc Burnette 2001 - 2009

From 2011 to 2020, St. Andrew's experienced three priests who left the church abruptly through various unfortunate circumstances, including Ed Hunt, Michael Rich, and Tommie Lee Watkins, Jr., who was the first openly gay African American ordained in the Episcopal Diocese of Alabama and the first African American to serve as rector of St. Andrew's. Watkins helped establish the St. Andy's Food Pantry, which serves the neighborhood on two Saturdays each month. After a three year interim, the Reverend Peter Alan Helman became the eighteenth rector of the parish in November 2023.

The present church building, completed in 1915, was listed on the U.S. National Register of Historic Places in 1986. The brownstone edifice was designed by the local firm of Joy & Marriott, patterned after English Gothic parish churches.

Saint Andrew's observes two Masses on Sunday mornings, 8:00 am which is a spoken Mass, and 10:30 am which is a sung Mass with the parish choir. The church offers services of Choral Evensong at 5:30 pm on the second Sunday of each month which is preceded by an organ prelude series beginning at 5:15 pm which features local and guest organists. The current Organist and Choirmaster is Cody Lawyer.

== See also ==
- St. Andrew's Episcopal Church
