= St. James' Episcopal Church (Cedartown, Georgia) =

Historic church in Georgia, US

- St. James' Episcopal Churchy
- U.S. National Register of Historic Places
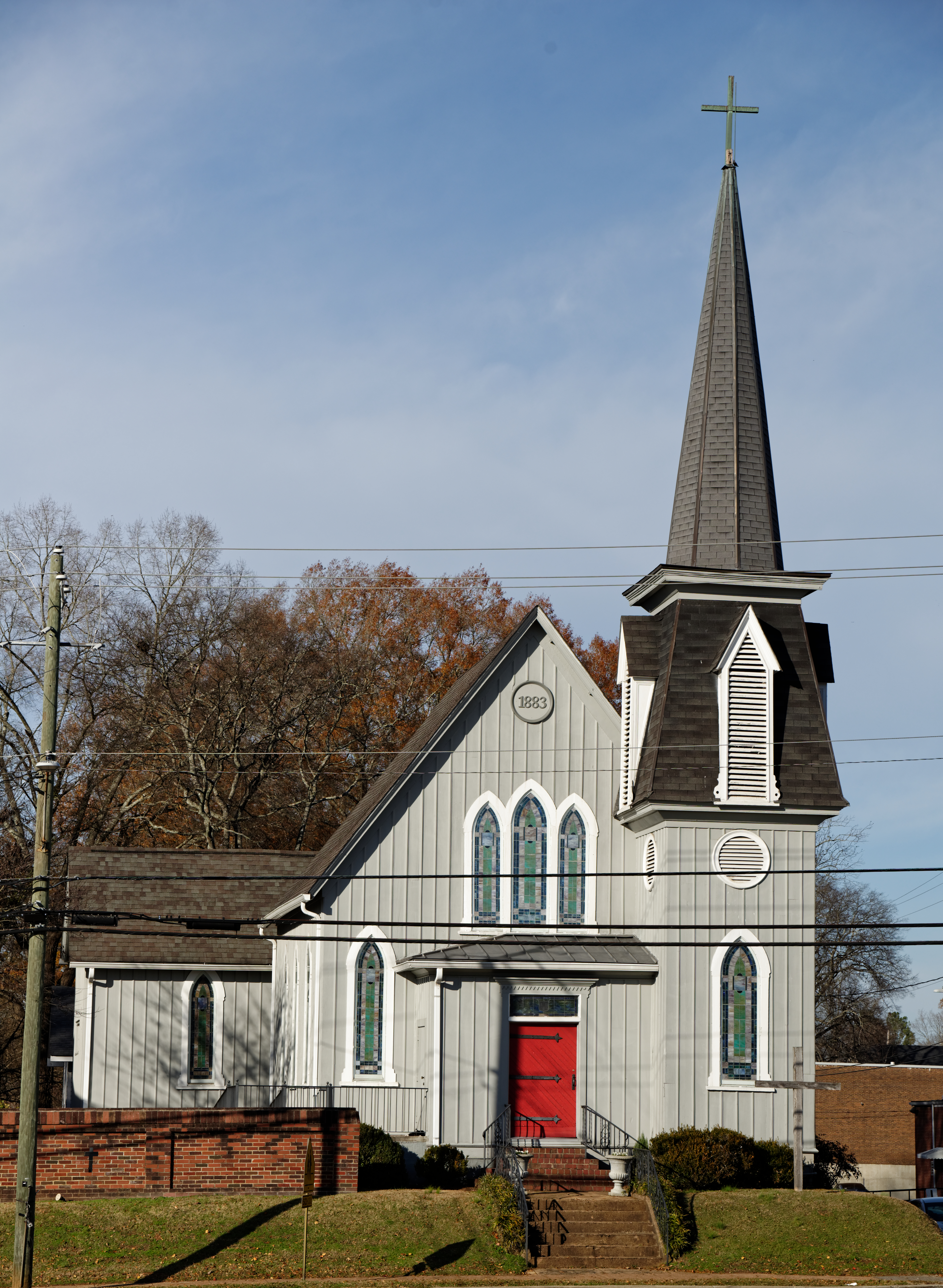
- 2019 photo

- Location within Georgia
- Location: 302 and 308 West Ave., Cedartown, Georgia
- Coordinates: 34°00′40″N 85°15′30″W
- Area: less than one acre
- Built: 1884
- NRHP reference No.: 100004293
- Added to NRHP: October 7, 2019

The St. James' Episcopal Church in Cedartown, Georgia, at 302 and 308 West Ave., was listed on the National Register of Historic Places in 2019. The congregation was formed in 1878, and five years later began construction of its church. It was opened for services in 1884. It is a parish of the Episcopal Diocese of Atlanta.

In 2015, the church reported 54 members; in 2023, it reported 64 members. No membership statistics were reported in 2024 national parochial reports. Plate and pledge financial support reported by the church in 2024 was $106,807. Average Sunday Attendance (ASA) reported in 2024 was 27 persons.
