= Rob Wright (bishop) =

American Episcopalian bishop

The Right Reverend Robert Christopher Wright
- Bishop of Atlanta
- Church: Episcopal Church
- Diocese: Atlanta
- Elected: June 2, 2012
- In office: 2012–present
- Predecessor: J. Neil Alexander

Orders
- Ordination: February 13, 1999 by Jane Dixon
- Consecration: October 13, 2012 by Katharine Jefferts Schori

Personal details
- Born: February 3, 1964 (age 62) Pittsburgh, Pennsylvania, United States
- Denomination: Anglican
- Parents: Earl C. & Charlene Wright
- Spouse: Beth-Sarah Panton (m. July 4, 1998)
- Children: 5
- Education: Howard University; Virginia Theological Seminary

Robert Christopher Wright (born February 3, 1964) is tenth and current bishop of the Episcopal Diocese of Atlanta, serving from October 2012 to the present. He is the first African American to be elected to his position.

== Biography ==
Wright was born on February 3, 1964, in a Catholic orphanage in Pittsburgh, Pennsylvania. He was adopted at the age of nine months by Earl C. and Charlene Wright. He served as a US Navy helicopter crew chief and as a search and rescue diver for five years. He graduated from Howard University in 1991 with a degree in History and Political Science. He then worked as a child advocate for two mayors and the Children's Defense Fund.

He also studied at Ridley Hall, Cambridge in England earning a Certificate in Biblical Studies, and at the Virginia Theological Seminary from where he graduated with a Master of Divinity. He was ordained as a Deacon in 1998 and as a priest on February 13, 1999, by the Suffragan Bishop of Washington Jane Dixon. He became Canon Pastor and Vicar of the Congregation of St. Saviour at the Cathedral of St. John the Divine in New York. Between 1998 and 2000 he also served as chaplain of the Cathedral School in New York City. In 2002 he moved to Atlanta, Georgia, where he became Rector of St Paul's Episcopal Church.

Wright was elected Bishop of Atlanta on June 2, 2012, and was consecrated on October 13, 2012, in the Martin Luther King Jr. International Chapel at Morehouse College by Presiding Bishop Katharine Jefferts Schori.

In 2024 Wright was shortlisted to succeed Michael Curry as Presiding Bishop of the Episcopal Church.

== See also ==
- List of Episcopal bishops of the United States
- Historical list of the Episcopal bishops of the United States
