= Dave Collins (radio personality) =

British radio DJ

Dave Collins is a British radio DJ who has broadcast across a number of radio stations in his career including Voice of Peace and Radio Caroline and a dozen radio stations in the UK.

== Career ==
Dave was born in Liverpool and worked as a carpenter/joiner. He worked on various landbased pirate radio stations in Liverpool such as Radio Elenore. He also spent a short time working on ABC Radio in Dublin in the early 1980s and on Radio West in Mullingar in Ireland.

The Voice of Peace

In 1984, he joined The Voice of Peace radio station in Israel. He was known on the peace station run by Abie Nathan and broadcast from the East Mediterranean as Paul Rogers, the same name he used on Radio Elenore in Liverpool.

Radio Caroline

On Radio Caroline, he was the first to be heard on the radio in the early hours of 7 August 1985 as Dave Collins.

Others

Following Radio Caroline, he worked in Ireland at Radio West in Mullingar and then working in the UK on more than a dozen radio stations. He has presented at radio stations in the UK including Marcher Sound, Radio City, Red Rose, CFM and Wire FM. Moving into radio management, he was Head Of Presentation at CFM, Programme Controller at The Bay etc. He moved into sales roles after that as Accounts Manager for Yorkshire Coast Radio, Minster FM and Viking FM/Magic 1161 in Hull.

Following his days in offshore radio on Radio Caroline, VOP and Radio Seagull, Young has also been included in The Pirate Radio Hall Of Fame.

Personal life

In February 2008, after leaving Wire FM, he went travelling around the world with his partner.

He now works in media sales as Commercial Partnerships Director at The Brussels Times.
