= Christ Church (Macon, Georgia) =

Historic church in Georgia, United States

- Christ Episcopal Church; Christ Church Macon
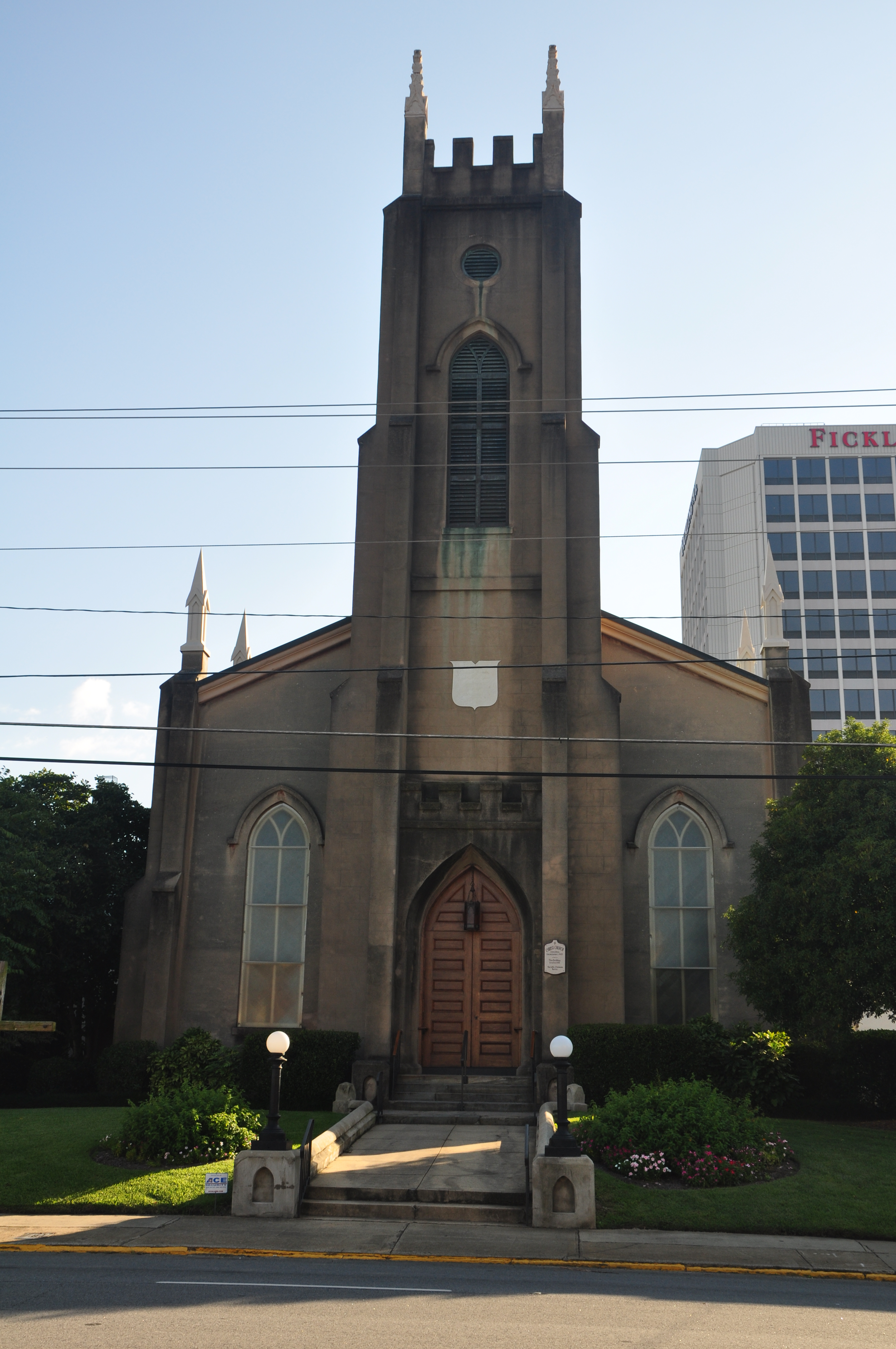
- Christ Church (2014)

- Location within Georgia Location within the United States
- 32°50′18.5″N 83°37′35.2″W
- Location: 582 Walnut Street; Macon, Georgia 31201
- Denomination: Episcopal Church
- Previous denomination: Protestant Episcopal Church in the Confederate States of America (1861–1865)
- Website: www.christchurchmacon.com

History
- Founded: May 5, 1825
- Consecrated: 1838 (first building); May 2, 1852 (current building)

Architecture
- Style: Gothic
- Completed: 1834 (first building); 1851 (current building)
- Demolished: 1851 (first building)

Administration
- Province: Province IV
- Diocese: Episcopal Diocese of Atlanta
- Christ Episcopal Church
- U.S. National Register of Historic Places
- NRHP reference No.: 71000250
- Added to NRHP: July 14, 1971

Christ Church is an Episcopal church in Macon, Georgia. Founded in 1825, it was the first church established in the city. It is a congregation of the Episcopal Diocese of Atlanta.

In 2015, the church reported 654 members; in 2023, it reported 689 members. No membership statistics were reported in 2024 national parochial reports. Plate and pledge financial support reported by the church in 2024 was $869,076. Average Sunday Attendance (ASA) reported in 2024 was 162 persons. This was a relative decrease on ASA of 234 in 2015.

The current building was built in 1851 and added to the National Register of Historic Places in 1971.

== History ==
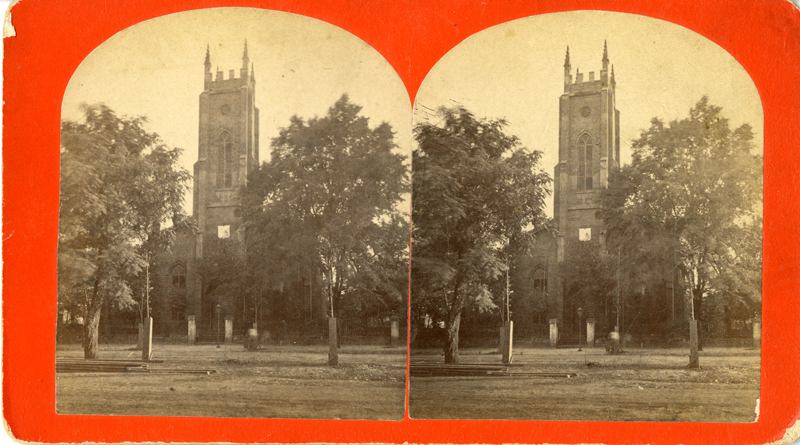
Christ Episcopal Church circa 1876

Christ Church was founded by Reverend Lot Jones on May 5, 1825 while on a mission through Georgia. Organized only three years after Macon was incorporated, it was the first church to be founded in the city. In 1826, the fourth convention for the Episcopal Diocese of Georgia was held at the Macon parish, with Bishop Nathaniel Bowen of the Episcopal Diocese of South Carolina presiding. The first building was constructed in 1834 and later consecrated in 1838. On February 24, 1844, Thomas Fielding Scott was ordained priest by Bishop Stephen Elliott in this building. In 1851, the church building was demolished and replaced by the current structure, a Gothic building which was consecrated by Elliott on May 2, 1852. In October 1863, the church donated its large church bell to the Macon Arsenal as part of the war effort. It would later be replaced in 1868. On December 19, 1867, noted poet Sidney Lanier was married in the church. On July 14, 1971, the church was added to the National Register of Historic Places.

In 1999, a Fisk organ was installed in the nave.

== See also ==
- National Register of Historic Places listings in Bibb County, Georgia

== Bibliography ==
- "Christ Church: Episcopal". Georgia Historical Society. June 16, 2014.
- Iobst, Richard W. (2009). Civil War Macon: The History of a Confederate City. Mercer University Press. ISBN 978-0-88146-172-5 – via Google Books.
- Onofrio, Jan (1999). Oregon Biographical Dictionary. Somerset Publishers, Inc. ISBN 978-0-403-09841-5 – via Google Books.
- Perry, William Stevens (1885). The History of the American Episcopal Church, 1587-1883: The organization and progress of the American church, 1783-1883. Vol. II. James R. Osgood and Company – via Google Books.
