= Bennett Sims =

Sixth bishop of the Episcopal Diocese of Atlanta (1920–2006)

The Right Reverend Bennett Jones Sims L.H.D., D.D.
- Bishop of Atlanta
- Church: Episcopal Church
- Diocese: Atlanta
- Elected: 1971
- In office: 1972–1983
- Predecessor: Randolph Claiborne
- Successor: C. Judson Child Jr.

Orders
- Ordination: April 15, 1950 by Noble C. Powell
- Consecration: February 26, 1972 by John E. Hines

Personal details
- Born: August 9, 1920 Greenfield, Massachusetts, United States
- Died: July 17, 2006 (aged 85) Hendersonville, North Carolina, United States
- Buried: St Francis Chapel, Kanuga, North Carolina
- Denomination: Anglican
- Parents: Lewis Raymond Sims & Sarah Cosette
- Spouse: Beatrice Wimberly (m. 1943); Mary Page Welborn (m. 1988)
- Children: 3

Bennett Jones Sims (August 9, 1920 – July 17, 2006) was the sixth bishop of the Episcopal Diocese of Atlanta, consecrated in 1972. Upon retirement from the Diocese in 1983, Sims founded the Institute for Servant Leadership at Emory University and served as president of the institute until 1999.

== Biography ==
Son of Lewis Raymond and Sarah Cosette Sims, Bennett J. Sims was born in Greenfield, Massachusetts. In 1943, he earned a BA from Baker University. On September 25 of that year, he married Beatrice Wimberly.

During World War II, Sims served in the United States Navy as a line officer on destroyers. He then attended Virginia Theological Seminary, earning his Master of Divinity in 1948. In June of that year, he was made a deacon and in April 1950 he was ordained a priest. Both times he was ordained by Noble C. Powell, Bishop of Maryland. Sims became Curate at Church of the Redeemer, Baltimore, Maryland, in 1949 and two years later was named its rector, serving until 1962. That year he served as priest-in-charge at St. Alban's Church in Tokyo, Japan.

From 1963 to 1964, he served as Rector of Christ Church in Corning, New York, participating in the 1963 March on Washington for Jobs and Freedom, where Martin Luther King Jr. gave his famous "I Have a Dream" speech. From 1964 to 1965 he was a Harvard fellow. In 1968, he signed the “Writers and Editors War Tax Protest” pledge, vowing to refuse tax payments in protest against the Vietnam War. He returned to VTS, receiving a Doctorate in Divinity in 1966. From 1966 to 1972 he was director of the Continuing Education Department at Virginia Seminary, also serving, in 1969, as priest-in-charge at St. Alban's Church in Tokyo, Japan, and studied systematic theology at The Catholic University of America, Washington, D.C. (1969-1971).

== Episcopate ==
In 1972, Sims was elected bishop of the Diocese of Atlanta. During his episcopacy, he was in strong opposition to the rising divorce rate, and spoke about his preference for the integrity of marriage vows. Among the issues receiving his support and leadership were racial integration of the public schools, revision of the Episcopal prayer book, the ordination of women, and, ultimately, the acceptance of homosexuals in the church.

Upon retirement from the Diocese of Atlanta, he stayed in Atlanta, where he founded the Institute for Servant Leadership at Emory University in 1983. From 1980 to 1988, Sims held a visiting professorship at Candler School of Theology at Emory University. Sims married a second time on August 27, 1988, to Mary Page Welborn, and together they moved the Institute for Servant Leadership to Hendersonville, North Carolina. He continued to serve as president of the institute until his retirement in 1999. Sims died at the age of 85 at his home on July 17, 2006.

== Bibliography ==
- Invitation to Hope: A Testimony of Encouragement (1974)
- Sex and Homosexuality: A Pastoral Statement (1977)
- Purple Ink: A Selection of the Writings of Bennett J. Sims as Bishop of Atlanta (1982)
- Servanthood: Leadership for the Third Millennium (1997, 2005) ISBN 9781597520751
- Why Bush Must Go: A Bishop’s Faith-Based Challenge (2004)
- The Time of My Life: A Spiritual Pilgrimage Grounded in Hope (2006).

== Consecrators ==
- John E. Hines, 22nd Presiding Bishop of the Episcopal Church in the United States
- Randolph Royall Claiborne, Jr., 5th Bishop of Atlanta
- William Davidson, 6th Bishop of Western Kansas

Bennett Sims was the 676th bishop consecrated in the Episcopal Church.

== See also ==
- Episcopal Diocese of Atlanta
- Historical list of bishops of the Episcopal Church in the United States of America

== Notes ==
Episcopal Church (USA) titles
Preceded by Randolph Claiborne	6th Bishop of Atlanta; 1972 – 1983	Succeeded by C. Judson Child, Jr.
