= Trinity Episcopal Church (Columbus, Georgia) =

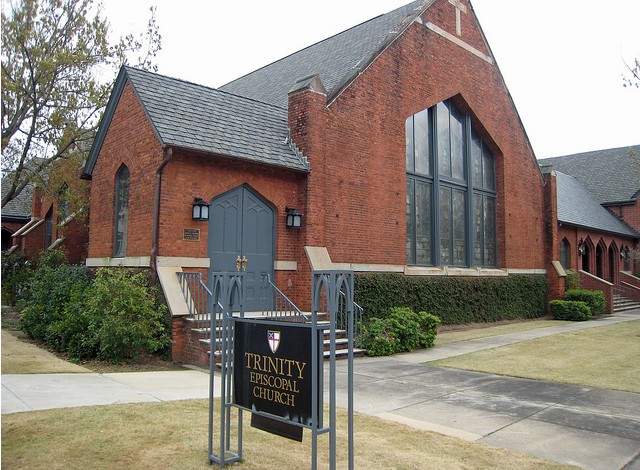
- Trinity Episcopal Church in 2011
- Trinity Episcopal Church
- Location: 1130 1st Ave, Columbus GA 31901
- Country: United States
- Denomination: Episcopal Church
- Website: Official website
- Trinity Episcopal Church
- U.S. National Register of Historic Places
- Location: 1130 1st Ave., Columbus, Georgia
- Coordinates: 32°28′4″N 84°59′28″W
- Built: 1891
- Architectural style: Gothic Revival
- MPS: Columbus MRA
- NRHP reference No.: 80001205
- Added to NRHP: September 29, 1980

History
- Founder(s): Dr. Edwin Louis de Graffenried and local community members

Architecture
- Style: Gothic Revival
- Years built: 1891

Clergy
- Rector: Rev. Timothy H. Graham

Trinity Episcopal Church is an Episcopal church located in Columbus, Georgia.

== History ==
The church was founded in 1834 and was the fifth Episcopal church in the state of Georgia. The first church building was completed in 1837. The current building was built in 1890-91 and formally consecrated in 1892.

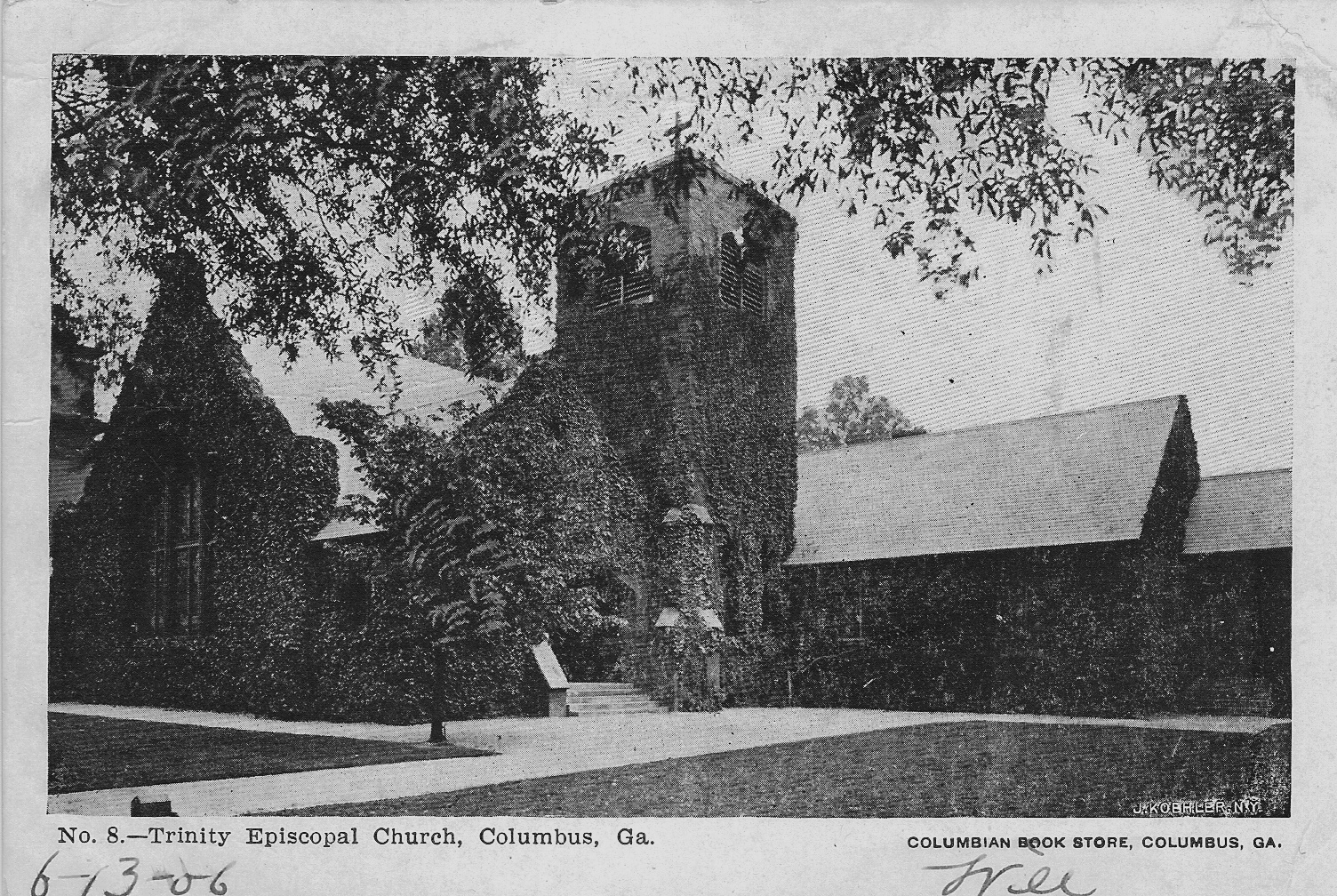
Trinity Episcopal Church in 1906

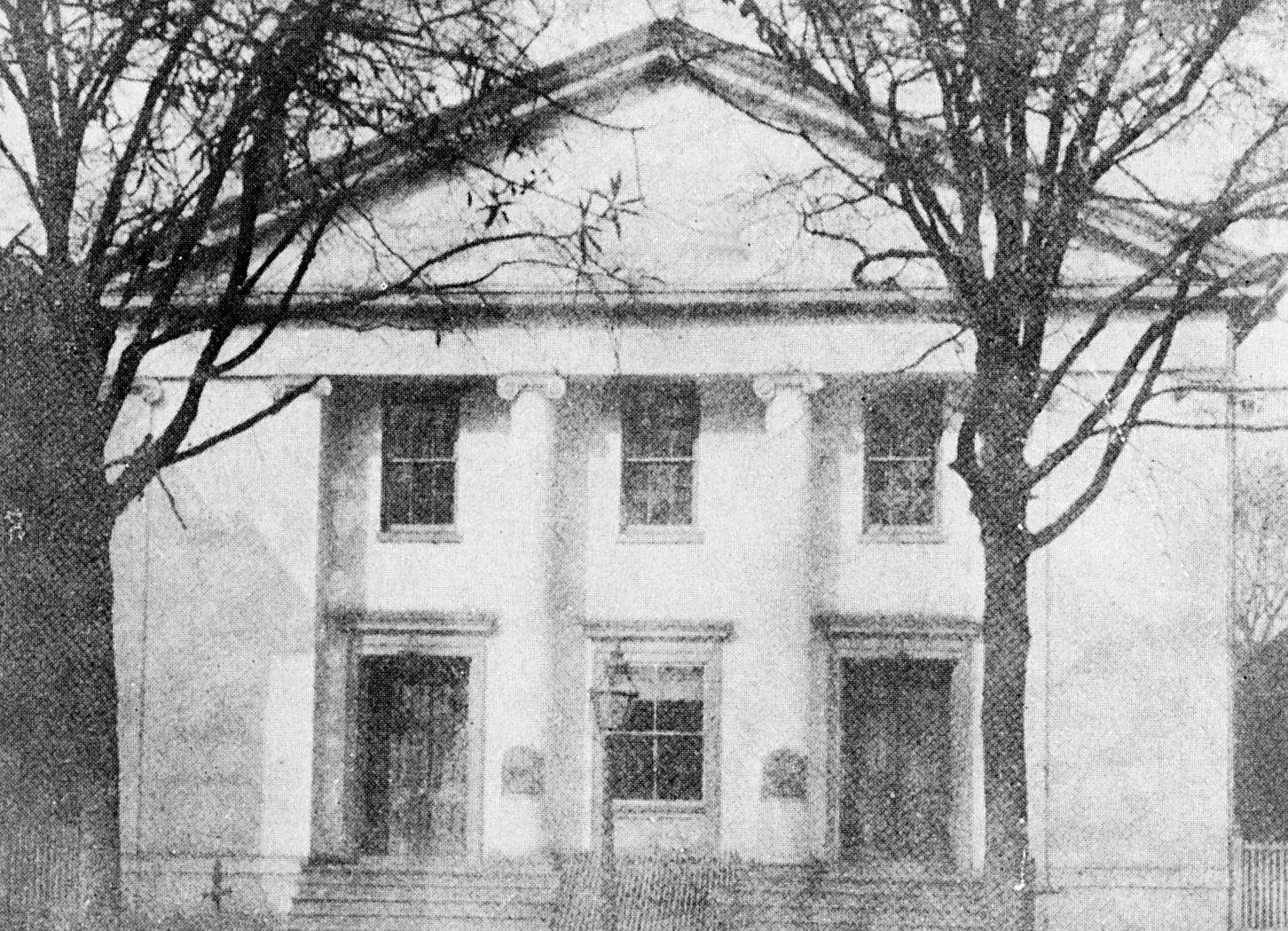
From the time of its founding and until the completion of its first church building, services were held at the deGraffenried house, at the neighboring Presbyterian house of worship, and at the "Female Academy in Columbus, GA.

== See also ==
- National Register of Historic Places listings in Muscogee County, Georgia
- Episcopal Diocese of Georgia
