= Frederick F. Reese =

Bishop of Georgia; American Episcopalian bishop (1854–1936)

The Right Reverend Frederick Focke Reese D.D.
- Bishop of Georgia
- Church: Episcopal Church
- Diocese: Georgia
- Elected: February 3, 1908
- In office: 1908–1936
- Predecessor: Cleland Kinloch Nelson
- Successor: Middleton S. Barnwell

Orders
- Ordination: June 1877 by William Pinkney
- Consecration: May 20, 1908 by Cleland Kinloch Nelson

Personal details
- Born: October 23, 1854 Baltimore, Maryland, United States
- Died: December 22, 1936 (aged 82) Savannah, Georgia, United States
- Buried: Bonaventure Cemetery
- Denomination: Anglican
- Parents: John Smith Reese & Arnoldina Olivia Focke
- Spouse: Ella Parr (m. Nov. 11, 1879)
- Children: 5
- Education: University of Maryland

Frederick Focke Reese (October 23, 1854 – December 22, 1936) was the fourth Bishop of Georgia. Reese was the 238th bishop of the Episcopal Church in the United States of America (ECUSA).

== Life ==
Frederick Focke Reese was born in Baltimore, Maryland, on October 23, 1854. He attended the University of Virginia, where he joined the Fraternity of Delta Psi (a.k.a. St. Anthony Hall) in 1875. He graduated from the University of Maryland and Berkeley Theological Seminary before his ordination to the diaconate in 1876 by Bishop William Rollinson Whittingham and priesthood in 1877 by Bishop William Pinkney. He served as an Episcopal priest in Baltimore, Virginia, and for Christ Church in Macon, Georgia, before becoming the Rector of Christ Church, Nashville.

He received his D.D. from the University of Georgia in 1900. He graduated from the University of the South in 1908.

In February 1908 the Diocese of Georgia met in convention in Augusta to elect Reese as the fourth Bishop of Georgia and the first after the diocese was split into the Dioceses of Georgia and of Atlanta in 1907. He was consecrated in Christ Church, Savannah, on May 20, 1908.

That spring of 1908, poor health caused the newly elected bishop to take an extended leave of absence, resuming ecclesiastical duties April 1, 1909. During his tenure as bishop, the missionary work of the diocese concerned the creation of new missions for African Americans; however, he excluded all African Americans from church government, forcing Deaconess Anna Alexander to seek assistance from the Episcopal Board of Missions. By 1913, there were two predominantly Black parishes in the Diocese, St. Athanasius Church, Brunswick, and St. Stephen's, Savannah, as well as thirteen predominantly Black missions.

On the twentieth anniversary of his consecration, at the convention in 1928, Reese asked about disappearing communicants, noting the 5,290 people he had confirmed in 20 years. He said,

Are we so unconcerned or so powerless that we can do nothing? ...We must be aggressive, though wise, on the offensive.

He went on to encourage laypersons to a "lay ministry of personal evangelism." In the year of his retirement, 1934, the Diocese had its highest number of confirmations to date at 319. He died in Savannah on December 22, 1936.

The Episcopal camp on Saint Simons Island was named in his honor. After that was sold and the camp and conference center was moved to its current location on Honey Creek in Camden County, the dining hall at that new facility was named the Reese Dining Hall for Reese.

He was succeeded by Middleton S. Barnwell as Bishop of Georgia.

== Sources ==
- The Episcopal Church in Georgia 1733–1957, by Henry Thompson Malone, published by The Protestant Episcopal Church in the Diocese of Atlanta, 1960
