= Randolph Claiborne =

American bishop

The Right Reverend Randolph Royall Claiborne D.D.
- Bishop of Atlanta
- Church: Episcopal Church
- Diocese: Atlanta
- Elected: March 23, 1953
- In office: 1953–1972
- Predecessor: John B. Walthour
- Successor: Bennett Sims
- Previous post: Suffragan Bishop of Alabama (1949-1953)

Orders
- Ordination: January 1932 by Henry J. Mikell
- Consecration: June 29, 1949 by Henry St. George Tucker

Personal details
- Born: November 7, 1906 Farmville, Virginia, United States
- Died: February 22, 1986 (aged 79) Atlanta, Georgia, United States
- Buried: St. James Episcopal Cemetery
- Denomination: Anglican
- Parents: Randolph Royall Claiborne & Mary Thomas Clark
- Spouse: Clara Virginia Kinney Stribling (m. 1953)
- Education: University of Virginia

Randolph Royall Claiborne Jr. (November 7, 1906 – February 22, 1986) was the 5th bishop of the Episcopal Diocese of Atlanta, elected in 1952. Previously he had served as Bishop Suffragan in the Episcopal Diocese of Alabama.

== Background ==
Randolph was born November 7, 1906, to the Reverend Randolph Royall Claiborne, vicar of the Episcopal Church in Farmville, Virginia, and Mary Thomas Clark. The Claiborne family moved to Marietta, Georgia, where Randolph Sr. served as Rector at St James' Church.

Randolph Jr. attended the University of Virginia, receiving his bachelor's degree in 1928. He then attended Virginia Theological Seminary in Alexandria, receiving his Master of Divinity in 1931. He was made deacon in June 1931 by Bishop Gravatt and ordained priest in January 1932 by Bishop Mikell. From 1932 to 1938, he served as Rector of St James' Church, Macon, Georgia. From there he moved to Church of the Nativity in Huntsville, Alabama, serving from 1938 to 1949 as rector.

In 1949, he was elected bishop suffragan of Alabama. In 1952, he was chosen to serve as the fifth bishop of Atlanta. He was installed as diocesan bishop at a service held in St. Peter's Church in Rome, Georgia. According to C.J. Wyatt's history of St. Peter's Church this was so that he could say he had been consecrated at "St. Peter's in Rome." Bishop Clairborne told the Annual Council Meeting of the diocese that met the weekend of his consecration of his connections to the previous bishops. Wyatt writes:

"Every Bishop of Atlanta had been my friend." Bishop Nelson had often visited his home during the Georgia ministry of his father; Bishop Mikell had been "an inspiration during the days of my youth" and later. Bishop Walker was the examining chaplain who certified him for ordination. Bishop Walthour "became my friend during the years in which we both took Holy Orders."

He married Clara Virginia Kinney Stribling on June 9, 1953. Bishop Claiborne retired in 1972, and was given the title "Bishop Emeritus" in honor of his 20-year service to the diocese.

=== Consecrators ===
- Henry St. G. Tucker, 19th Presiding Bishop of the Episcopal Church
- Charles C. J. Carpenter 6th bishop of Alabama
- Noble C. Powell, 9th bishop of Maryland

Randolph Claiborne was the 489th bishop consecrated in the Episcopal Church.

== See also ==
- Historical list of bishops of the Episcopal Church in the United States of America

Episcopal Church (USA) titles
Preceded by John B. Walthour	5th Bishop of Atlanta; 1953–1972	Succeeded by Bennett J. Sims
