= Henry J. Mikell =

American bishop

The Right Reverend Henry Judah Mikell D.D., LL.D.
- Bishop of Atlanta
- Church: Episcopal Church
- Diocese: Atlanta
- Elected: June 26, 1917
- In office: 1917–1942
- Predecessor: Cleland Kinloch Nelson
- Successor: John M. Walker

Orders
- Ordination: 1899 by Ellison Capers
- Consecration: November 1, 1917 by Thomas F. Gailor

Personal details
- Born: August 4, 1873 Sumter, South Carolina, United States
- Died: February 20, 1942 (aged 68) Atlanta, Georgia, United States
- Buried: Westview Cemetery
- Denomination: Anglican
- Parents: Thomas Price Mikell & Rebecca Moses
- Spouse: Henrietta Campbell Bryan (m. 1905)
- Education: Sewanee: The University of the South

Henry Judah Mikell (August 4, 1873 - February 20, 1942) was the second bishop of the Episcopal Diocese of Atlanta from 1917 till 1942.

== Background ==
Henry Judah Mikell, served as Bishop for the Episcopal Diocese of Atlanta from 1917 - 1942. During this time, he emphasized the need for the Episcopal Church to work with the state's college students, as well as to continue its work among African Americans. Under his leadership the diocese established college centers, which ministered to students at universities and colleges around Georgia. In 1933, as part of his efforts to help young people affected by the depression, Mikell founded "Camp Mikell" at Toccoa Falls. Relocated in 1941 to another site outside of Toccoa, the Mikell Camp and Conference Center continues to support meetings, classes, contemplative retreats, summer camps for kids, and recreational gatherings for Episcopalians of all ages.

Henry Judah Mikell was the 292nd bishop consecrated in the Episcopal Church.

The Mikell Memorial Chapel (1947) at the Cathedral of St. Philip in Atlanta, Georgia, was named in Bishop Mikell's honor.

Mikell was an initiate of the Alpha Alpha chapter of the Kappa Alpha Order and served as the 18th Knight Commander of the Order from 1926-1934.

== See also ==
- List of Bishop Succession in the Episcopal Church

Episcopal Church (USA) titles
| Preceded by Cleland Kinloch Nelson | Bishop of Atlanta; 1917 – 1942 | Succeeded by John M. Walker |
