= Episcopal Diocese of Atlanta =

Episcopal Church diocese in the US

Coordinates: 33.831145°N 84.386579°W

Diocese of Atlanta Diœcesis Atlantensis

Location
- Country: United States
- Ecclesiastical province: Province IV

Statistics
- Congregations: 91 (2023)
- Members: 43,211 (2023)

Information
- Denomination: Episcopal Church
- Established: December 4, 1907
- Cathedral: St Philip's Cathedral
- Language: English, Spanish

Current leadership
- Bishop: Robert Christopher Wright; Keith Bernard Whitmore (Assistant Bishop); Don Wimberly (Assistant Bishop)

Map
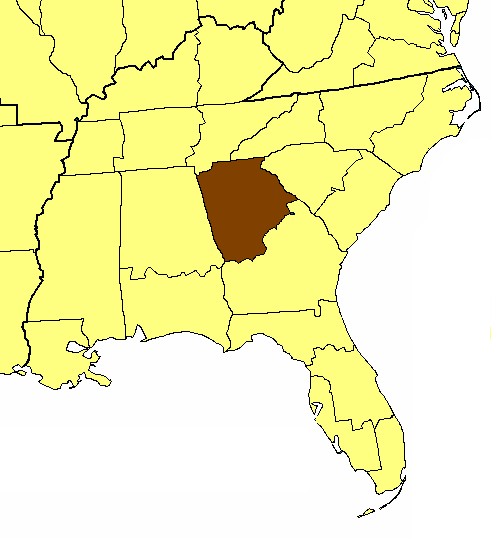
- Location of the Diocese of Atlanta

Website
- episcopalatlanta.org

The Episcopal Diocese of Atlanta is the diocese of the Episcopal Church in the United States of America, with jurisdiction over middle and north Georgia. It is in Province IV of the Episcopal Church and its cathedral, the Cathedral of St. Philip, is in Atlanta, as are the diocesan offices.

In 2024, the diocese reported average Sunday attendance (ASA) of 10,438 persons, a relative decline from 14,875 in 2015. No membership statistics were reported in 2024 national parochial reports. Reported membership declined from 49,591 in 2016 to 43,211 in 2023. Plate and pledge income for 2024 was $45,420,211.

== History ==
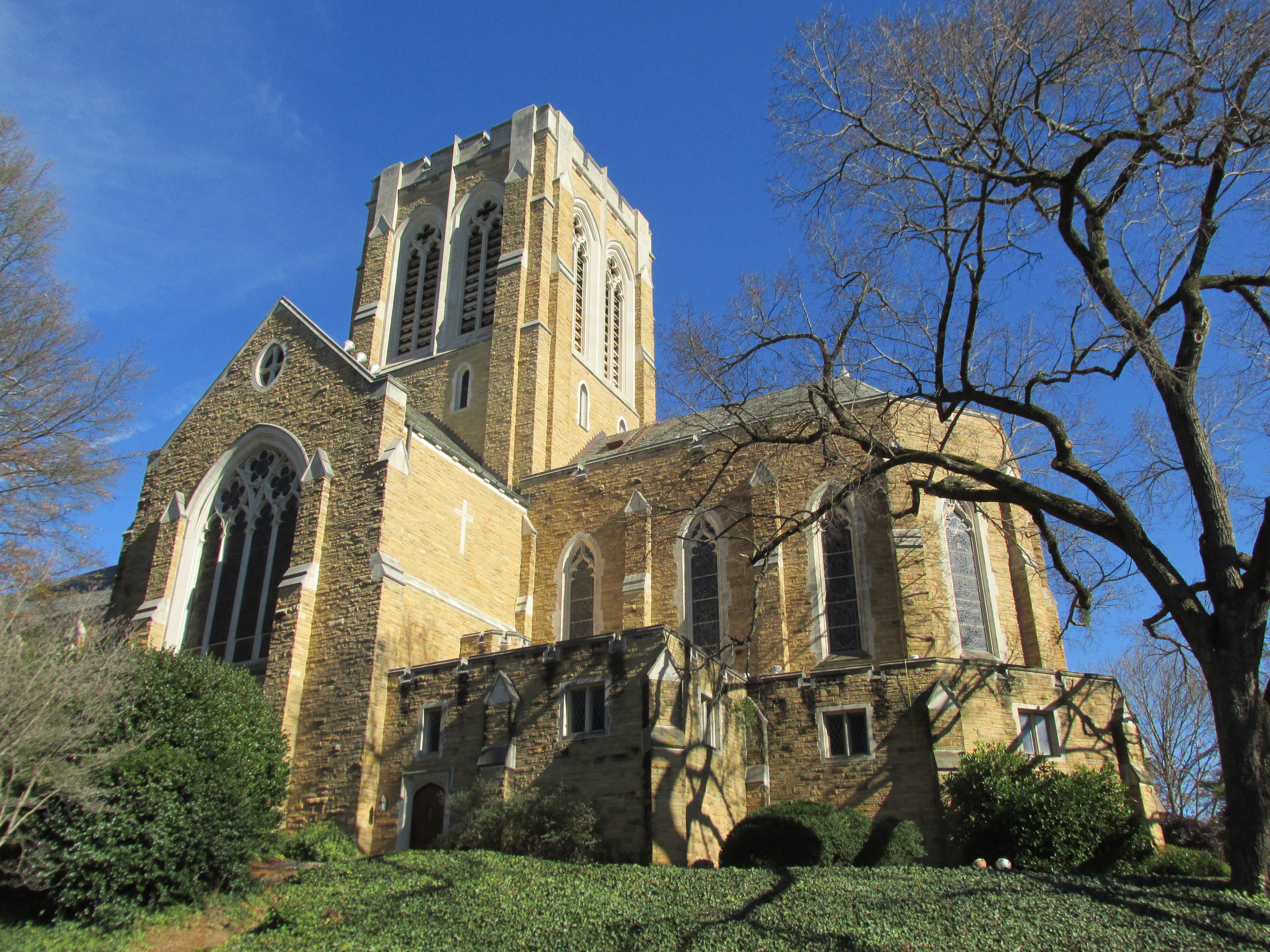
Cathedral of Saint Philip

The Anglican presence in Georgia was established on February 12, 1733, with Christ Church in Savannah, Georgia. By 1841, the Diocese of Georgia had been established. In 1907 the diocesan convention unanimously voted to divide the diocese, forming the Diocese of Atlanta. In December 1907, the Diocese of Atlanta held its first convention at Christ Church in Macon, Georgia.

In 2007, the diocese celebrated its centennial, and published a history of the diocese: The Diocese of Atlanta: Centennial Celebration 1907–2007.

For much of its history, the diocese has been one of the fastest-growing in the South, if not the country, due to the almost-geometric expansion of the population of metropolitan Atlanta. Although evangelical and high-church alternatives have always existed, most congregations generally hold to a Broad Church, moderate-to-liberal theology and middle-of-the-road worship, with some parishes priding themselves on their progressive stances. The Atlanta Diocese is thus considerably more liberal than many of the dioceses in the Fourth Province, since the area is home to a large population of highly educated, affluent professionals and white-collar employees, constituencies that have long been a mainstay of the Episcopal Church and that are not present in such large numbers elsewhere in the South.

On June 26, 2015, Bishop Wright announced that congregations within the Diocese could perform same-sex marriages.

== Bishops ==
The current bishop is Robert Christopher Wright, who was installed in October 2012. The immediate past bishop is J. Neil Alexander, who was installed in 2001. On January 25, 2006, he was nominated for election as Presiding Bishop, but he was defeated at the 2006 General Convention by Katharine Jefferts Schori.

=== List of bishops ===
Bishops of Atlanta
From	Until	Incumbent	Notes
1907	1917	Cleland Kinloch Nelson	Translated from Georgia.
1917	1942	Henry J. Mikell	Henry Judah Mikell (c. 1866 – 1942)
1942	1951	John M. Walker	
1952		John B. Walthour	
1953	1972	Randolph R. Claiborne, Jr.	Previously suffragan bishop of Alabama.
1967	1974	Milton L. Wood, suffragan bishop	
1972	1983	Bennett J. Sims	
1983	1988	C. Judson Child, Jr.	Suffragan bishop since 1978. April 25, 1923, in North Bergen, New Jersey – 2004
January 1, 1989	2000	Frank Allan	Coadjutor bishop from February 7, 1987, to January 1, 1989.
1995	2000	Onell Soto, assistant bishop	Previously Bishop of Venezuela.
2000	2001	Robert Tharp, assisting bishop	Robert Gould "Bob" Tharp (October 25, 1928, Orlando, FL – May 30, 2003); previously Bishop of East Tennessee.
July 7, 2001	October 2012	J. Neil Alexander	
April 2008	present	Keith Whitmore, assistant bishop	Keith Bernard Whitmore; previously Bishop of Eau Claire
October 2012	present	Robert Christopher Wright	First African-American elected to the position in the diocese.

== Parishes and missions ==
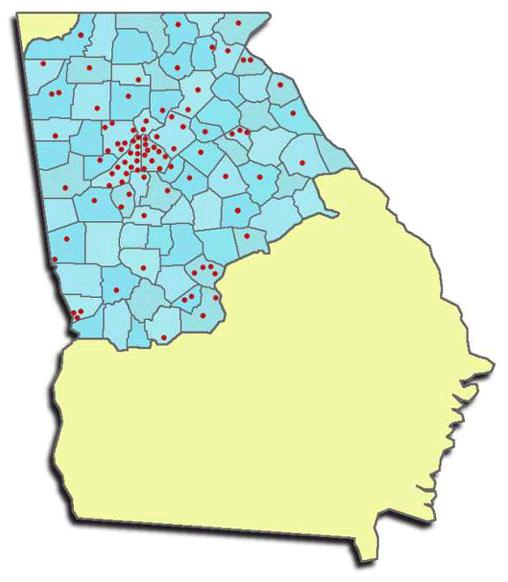
Map of Diocesan Parishes

The Diocese of Atlanta has 10 convocations (also known as deaneries) divided into 94 parishes and more than 55,000 parishioners.

- Chattahoochee Valley Convocation
  - St. Mary Magdalene Church, Columbus
  - St. Thomas Church, Columbus
  - Trinity Church, Columbus
  - St. Nicholas' Church, Hamilton
  - St. Mark's Church, LaGrange
  - St. John's Church, West Point
  - St. Thomas of Canterbury Church, Thomaston
  - Zion Church, Talbotton
- East Atlanta Convocation
  - Church of the Epiphany, Atlanta
  - Church of Our Saviour, Atlanta
  - St. Bartholomew's Church, Atlanta
  - St. Bede's Church, Atlanta
  - St. Simon's Church, Conyers
  - Church of the Good Shepherd, Covington
  - Holy Trinity Church, Decatur
  - Emory Campus Ministry
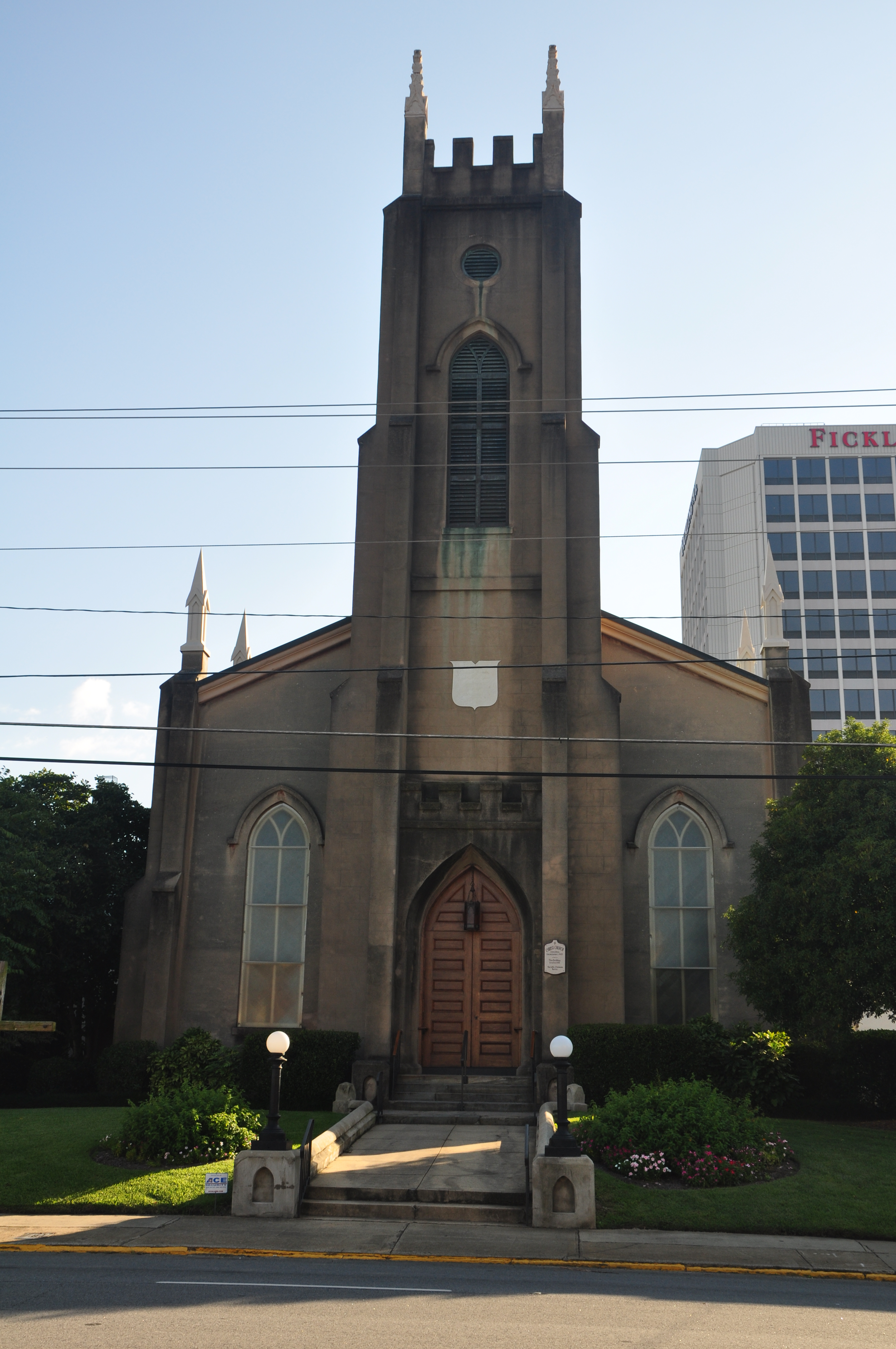
- Christ Church, Macon
  Macon Convocation
  - All Angels' Church, Eatonton
  - St. Andrew's Church, Fort Valley
  - St. Luke's Church, Fort Valley
  - Christ Church, Macon
  - St. Francis' Church, Macon
  - St. Paul's Church, Macon
  - St. Stephen's Church, Milledgeville
  - St. Mary's Church, Montezuma
  - St. Christopher's Church, Perry
  - All Saints' Church, Warner Robins
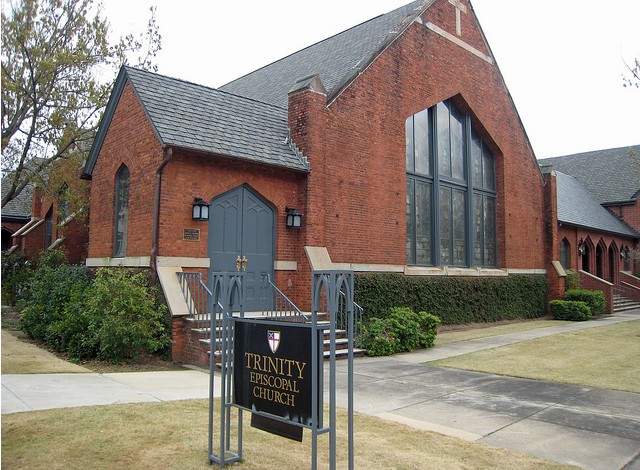
- Trinity Episcopal Church, Columbus
  Marietta Convocation
  - St. Aidan's Church, Alpharetta-Milton
  - St. Clement's Church, Canton
  - Church of the Holy Spirit, Cumming
  - Church of the Holy Family, Jasper
  - Christ Church, Kennesaw
  - Church of the Annunciation, Marietta
  - St. Catherine's Church, Marietta
  - St. James' Church, Marietta
  - St. Jude's Church, Marietta
  - St. Peter & St. Paul's Church, Marietta
  - St. Teresa's Church, Acworth
  - St. Benedict's Church, Smyrna
  - St. David's Church, Roswell
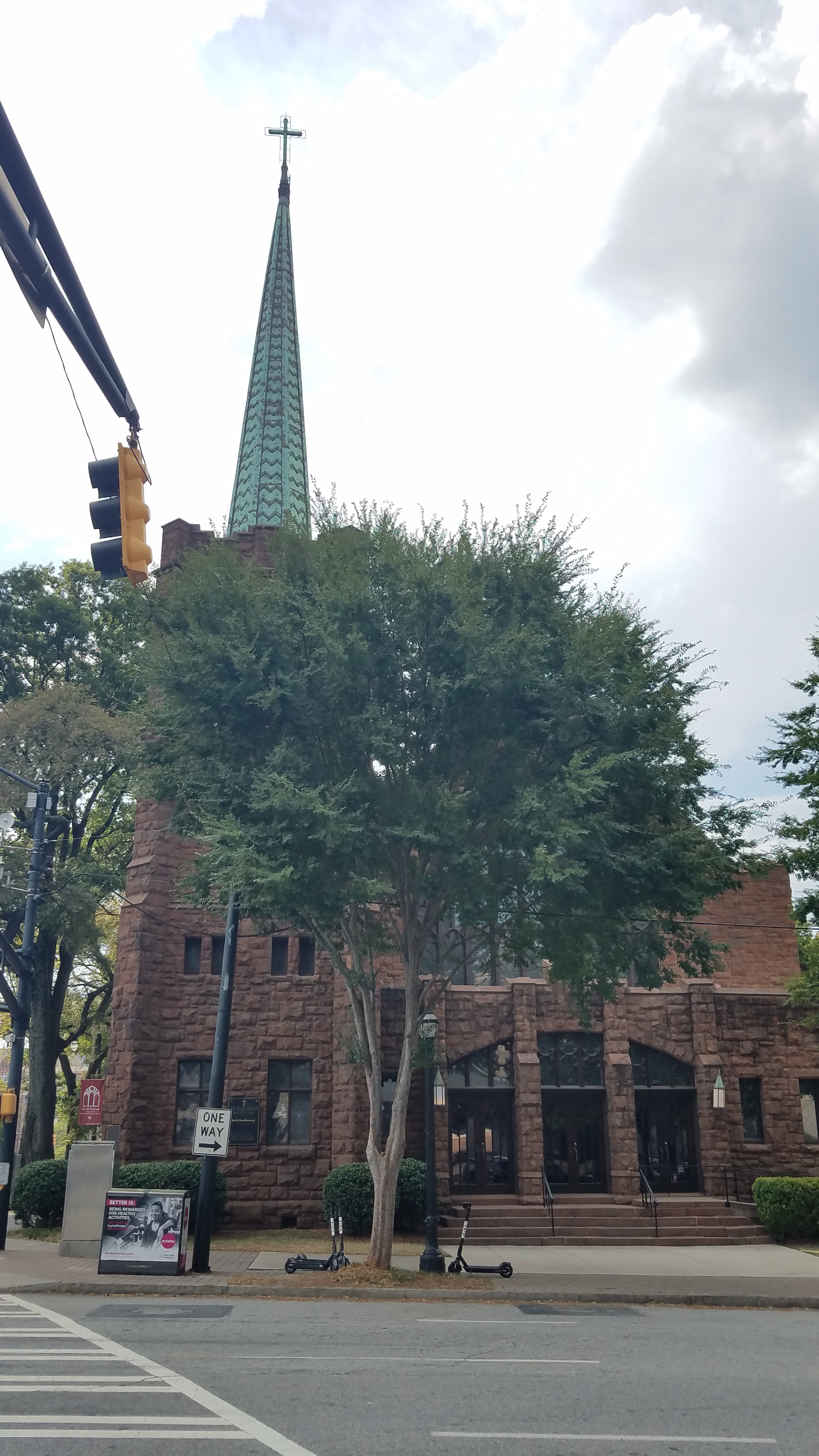
- All Saints' Episcopal Church, Atlanta
  Mid-Atlanta Convocation
  - St. Paul's Church, Atlanta
  - All Saints' Church, Atlanta
  - Church of the Incarnation, Atlanta
  - St. Luke's Church, Atlanta
  - Cathedral of St. Philip, Atlanta
  - St. Timothy's Church, Decatur
  - Church of the Holy Cross, Decatur
  - Iglesia de Santa Maria, East Point
  - Georgia Tech/Georgia State Campus
- North Atlanta Convocation
  - Emmaus House Community Center, Atlanta
  - Holy Comforter Church, Atlanta
  - Holy Innocents' Church, Atlanta
  - St. Anne's Church, Atlanta
  - St. Dunstan's Church, Atlanta
  - St. Martin in the Fields Church, Atlanta
  - Church of the Atonement, Sandy Springs
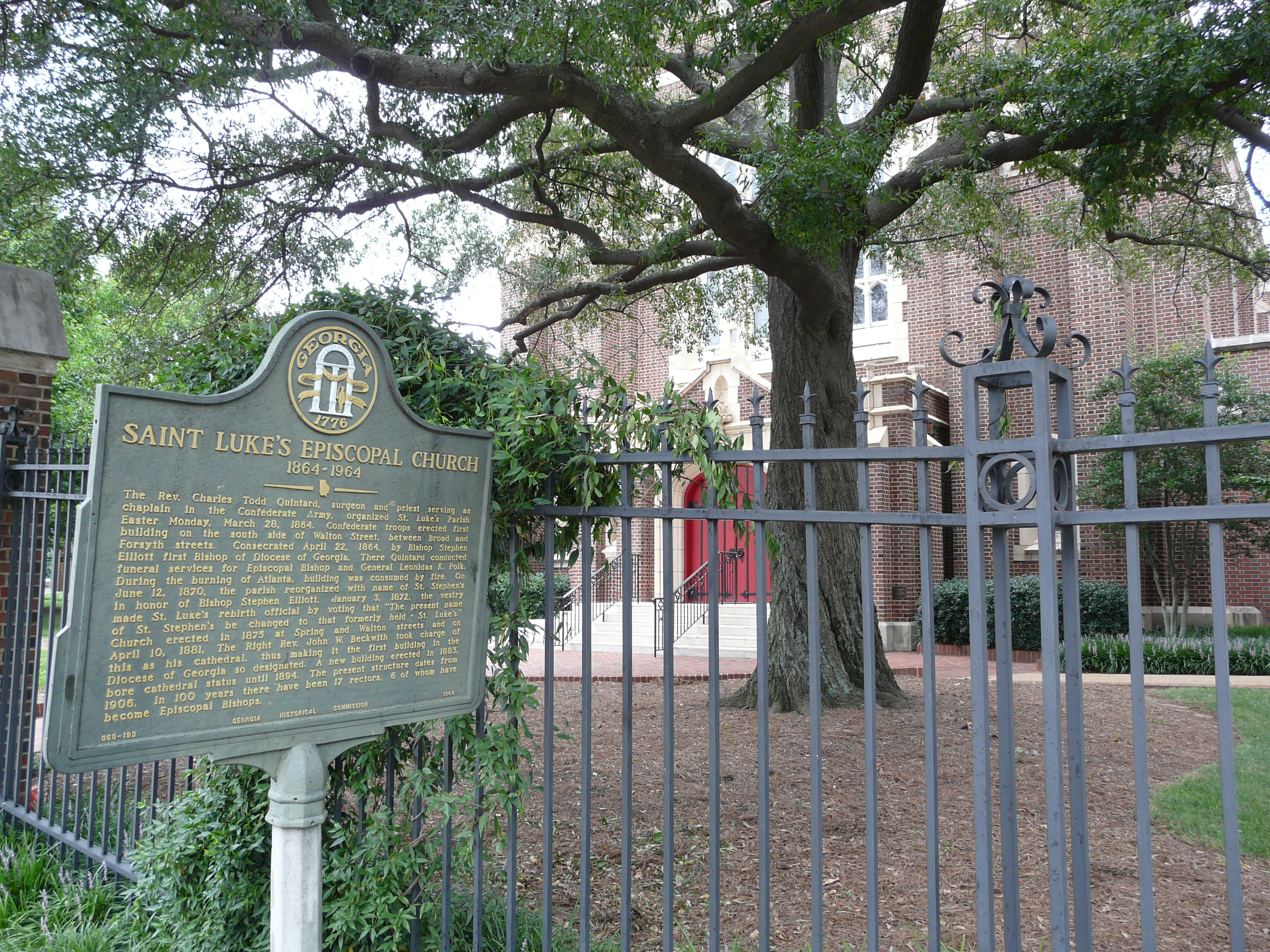
- St. Luke's Episcopal Church, Atlanta
  Northeast Georgia Convocation
  - St. Gregory the Great Church, Athens
  - Emmanuel Church, Athens
  - UGA Center, Athens
  - St. Clare's Church, Blairsville
  - Grace-Calvary Church, Clarkesville
  - Church of the Resurrection, Sautee-Nacoochee
  - St. Elizabeth's Church, Dahlonega
  - Grace Church, Gainesville
  - Church of the Redeemer, Greensboro
  - St. Alban's Church, Monroe
  - St. Matthias' Church, Toccoa
  - St. Gabriel's Church, Oakwood
  - Church of the Advent, Madison
  - Church of the Mediator, Washington
  - St. Andrew's Church, Hartwell
  - St. Anthony's Church, Winder
  - St. Alban's Church, Elberton
  - St. James' Church, Clayton
- Northeast Metro Convocation
  - St. Michael & All Angels' Church, Stone Mountain
  - St. Mary & St. Martha of Bethany Church, Buford
  - St. Matthew's Church, Snellville
  - St. Patrick's Church, Dunwoody
  - Christ Church, Norcross
  - Christ the King, Lilburn
  - St. Columba's Church, Johns Creek
  - St. Edward's Church, Lawrenceville
- Northwest Georgia Convocation
  - St. Timothy's Church, Calhoun
  - St. Peter's Church, Rome
  - Church of the Transfiguration, Rome
  - St. Barnabas' Church, Trion
  - Church of the Ascension, Cartersville
  - St. James' Church, Cedartown
  - St. Mark's Church, Dalton
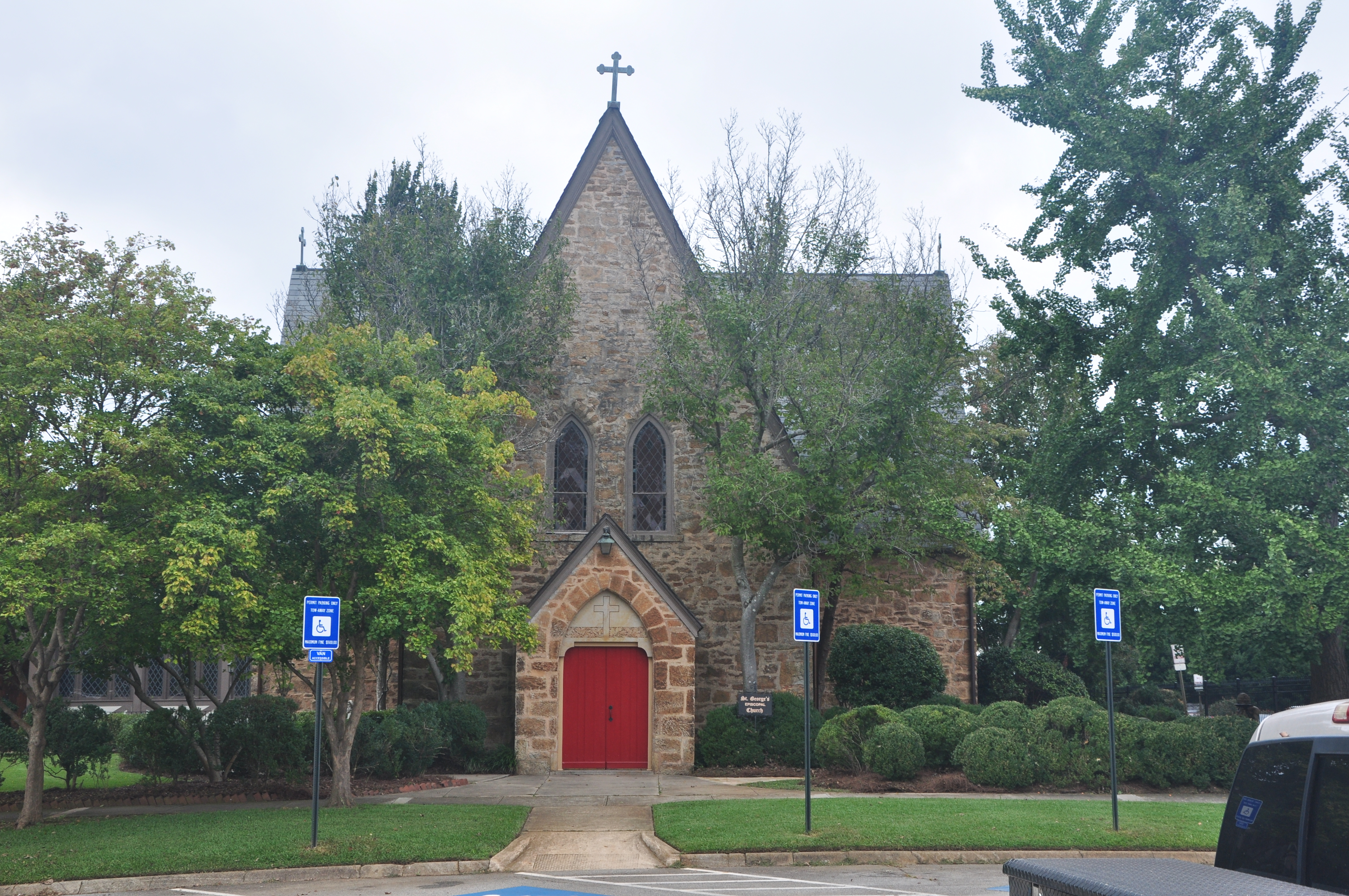
- St. George's Episcopal Church, Griffin
  Southwest Atlanta Convocation
  - St. Paul's Church, Newnan
  - St. Margaret's Church, Carrollton
  - St. Andrew's in the Pines, Peachtree City
  - St. Augustine of Canterbury Church, Morrow
  - St. John's Church, College Park
  - Church of the Good Shepherd, Austell
  - Church of the Nativity, Fayetteville
  - St. George's Church, Griffin
  - St. Joseph's Church, McDonough
  - St. Julian's Church, Douglasville

== Schools ==
- Children of Grace Preschool, Gainesville
- Emmanuel Episcopal Day School, Athens
- Holy Innocents' Episcopal School, Atlanta
- Redeemer Episcopal Academy, Eatonton
- St. Anne's Day School, Atlanta
- St. Benedict's Episcopal Day School, Smyrna
- St. Laurence Education Center, Acworth
- St. Mark's Kindergarten, LaGrange
- St. Martin's Episcopal School, Atlanta
- St. Matthew's Preschool, Snellville

== College chaplaincies ==
1. Absalom Jones Episcopal Student Center and Chapel, Atlanta
2. Emory Episcopal Center, Atlanta
3. Episcopal Center at Georgia Tech & GSU, Atlanta
4. UGA Episcopal Center, Athens
5. Canterbury Club of Kennesaw State University, a ministry of Christ Church, Kennesaw
6. Canterbury Club of Northwest Georgia for Berry College, Shorter University and Georgia Highlands College
7. Middle Georgia Campus Ministry for Wesleyan, Mercer, and Middle Georgia State University

== Ministries ==
- Appleton Family Ministries, Macon
- Chattahoochee Valley Episcopal Ministry, Columbus
- Church of the Common Ground, Atlanta
- Church of the Holy Comforter, Atlanta
- Emmaus House, Atlanta
- Episcopal Community Foundation for Middle and North Georgia, Atlanta
- Mikell Camp and Conference Center, Toccoa
- New Hope House, Griffin
- Path To Shine, Smyrna
- Society of St. Anna the Prophet, Atlanta
- The Road - The Episcopal Service Corps of Atlanta

== See also ==
- Historical list of bishops of the Episcopal Church in the United States of America
