= Vicente Msosa =

Mozambican Anglican bishop (born 1981)

The Most Reverend Vicente Msosa
- Presiding Bishop of the Anglican Church of Mozambique and Angola; Bishop of Zambezia
- Church: Anglican Church of Mozambique and Angola
- Diocese: Zambezia
- In office: 2025–present (as presiding bishop); 2021–present (as diocesan bishop)
- Predecessor: See created

Orders
- Ordination: 2013
- Consecration: 25 February 2017 by Thabo Makgoba

Personal details
- Born: 18 February 1981 (age 45) Chuanga, Mozambique
- Denomination: Anglicanism
- Spouse: Anastacia Msosa
- Children: 3

Vicente Msosa (born 18 February 1981) is a Mozambican Anglican bishop. He was the youngest bishop in the Anglican Communion when he was consecrated as bishop of Niassa in 2017 at the age of 35. Since 2024, he has been the first elected presiding bishop of the Anglican Church of Mozambique and Angola (Igreja Anglicana de Mocambique e Angola, or IAMA), the newest province of the Anglican Communion.

== Early life, education and career ==
Msosa was born in Chuanga, Mozambique, in 1981. He was educated locally and after finishing secondary school, he moved to the Teacher Training College, where he studied to be a teacher. While working as a teacher he was also involved in evangelism.

He studied theology at the College of the Transfiguration, in Grahamstown, South Africa, where he obtained a diploma. He was ordained a deacon and later a priest in 2013. He then studied for a degree in theology at Malawian Lake Anglican University. He was the priest at the São Paulo's Church in Lichinga when he was elected bishop.

== Episcopacy ==
The elective assembly of the Diocese of Niassa failed to elect a bishop in January 2016, leaving the nomination to the House of Bishops of the Anglican Church of Southern Africa. He was selected in September 2016 and consecrated on 25 February 2017. Msosa's installation took place at the Cathedral of Lichinga at 1 April 2017, in a service presided over by Archbishop Thabo Makgoba. He was one of the two ACSA bishops to attend GAFCON III in Jerusalem in June 2018.

In 2021, when IAMA was formed as a Lusophone Anglican province, Msosa was appointed the first bishop of the Missionary Diocese of Zambezia, which was created from the Diocese of Niassa. In November 2024, Msosa was elected the first presiding bishop and primate of IAMA, succeeding Carlos Matsinhe of the Diocese of Lebombo, who had served on an acting basis since IAMA's inception. Msosa was installed as primate in January 2025 in Luanda.

He has aligned IAMA with the Global South and the Global Anglican Future Conference. In addition to guest bishops from the Anglican Communion provinces of the Church of England and South Sudan, Gafcon General Secretary Paul Donison of the Anglican Church in North America and Miguel Uchôa of the Anglican Church in Brazil were also present.

== Personal life ==
Msosa is married to Anastacia and they have three children.

Anglican Communion titles
Preceded by Carlos Matsinhe acting	Presiding Bishop of the Anglican Church of Mozambique and Angola; Since 2025	Incumbent
New title	Bishop of Zambezia; Since 2021	Incumbent
Preceded by Mark van Koevering	Bishop of Niassa; 2017–2021	Succeeded by Lucas Mchema
