= Diocese of Angola =

Location
- Ecclesiastical province: Mozambique and Angola
- Archdeaconries: 4

Statistics
- Parishes: 63
- Members: c. 58,000

Information
- Rite: Anglican
- Cathedral: St Andrew the Apostle, Luanda

Current leadership
- Bishop: André Soares

The Diocese of Angola (Portuguese: Diocese Anglicana de Angola) is a diocese of the Anglican Church of Mozambique and Angola, (Note: This diocese was formerly part of the Anglican Church of Southern Africa) encompassing the entire country of Angola. It is divided into four archdeaconries (Luanda, Lukunga Lozi (Songo), Nzadi a Lukiki, and Uíge) with a total of 63 parishes.

== History ==
Anglicanism reached the Portuguese colony of Angola in 1923, due to the English missionary Archibald Patterson. The current diocese was formed from the Igreja Evangélica Unida de Angola, which shared a common history with the Igreja Evangélica Reformada de Angola from 1922 to 1975.

It was constituted as the Evangelical Reformed Church of Angola in 1975. Angola was an archdeaconry of the Mozambican Anglican Diocese of Lebombo until 2003. It became a missionary diocese of the Anglican Church of Southern Africa in 2003, with André Soares as the first (and only) missionary bishop. Bishop Soares had already shown his support for women's ordination, stating that he does not believe it to be an obstacle to ecumenism.

On St Andrew's Day, 30 November 2019, Thabo Makgoba, Archbishop of Cape Town, inaugurated the diocese as a full diocese of the church, blessed the site where St Andrew's Cathedral, Luanda is to be built, and installed Soares as diocesan bishop.

== Membership ==
The current membership is c. 58,000.

== List of bishops ==
- 2003–present: André Soares (missionary bishop until 2019)
