= William R. Moody =

Bishop of the Episcopal Diocese of Lexington

The Right Reverend William Robert Moody D.D.
- Bishop of Lexington
- Church: Episcopal Church
- Diocese: Lexington
- Elected: June 26, 1945
- In office: 1945–1971
- Predecessor: Almon Abbott
- Successor: Addison Hosea

Orders
- Ordination: April 8, 1927 by Arthur C. Thomson
- Consecration: October 24, 1945 by Henry St. George Tucker

Personal details
- Born: January 12, 1900 Columbus, Mississippi, United States
- Died: December 21, 1985 (aged 85)
- Denomination: Anglican
- Parents: William Robert Moody & Daisy Butler
- Spouse: Cordie Lee Winston Moncure
- Children: 2
- Education: Hampden–Sydney College

William Robert Moody Jr. (January 12, 1900 - December 21, 1985) was an American prelate who was Bishop of Lexington from 1945 to 1971.

== Early life and education ==
Moody was born in Columbus, Mississippi on January 12, 1900, the son of William Robert Moody and Daisy Butler. He studied at Hampden–Sydney College and earned a Bachelor of Arts in 1921. After graduation, he taught English and Spanish at Greenbrier Military School in Lewisburg, West Virginia, and in 1922 he became head of the English department, a post he kept till 1923. After that, he enrolled at the Virginia Theological Seminary to study for the ordained ministry and graduated with a Bachelor of Divinity in 1926. On July 25, 1928, he married Cordie Lee Winston Moncure, and together had two children. He was awarded an honorary Doctor of Divinity from Hampden–Sydney College in 1944, and another from the Virginia Theological Seminary in 1946.

== Ordained ministry ==
Moody was ordained deacon on June 4, 1926 by Bishop Beverley D. Tucker of Southern Virginia, and priest April 8, 1927 by Bishop Arthur C. Thomson, Coadjutor of Southern Virginia. Between 1927 and 1928, he served as priest-in-charge of St Andrew's Church in Lawrenceville, Virginia, Emmanuel Church in Callaville, Virginia and St Mark's Church in Cochran, Virginia. He then became rector of Grace Church in Silver Spring, Maryland and remained till 1933. In 1931, he also became Chairman of the department for religious education and a member of the Executive Council and the standing committee. In 1932, he served as instructor of Sacred Duties at St Alban's School for Boys in Washington, D.C. In 1933, he became rector of St Mark's Church in Washington, D.C., while in 1939 became rector of Christ Church in Baltimore.

== Bishop ==
On June 26, 1945, Moody was elected Bishop of Lexington on the third ballot. He was consecrated on October 24, 1945, at Christ Church Cathedral (Lexington, Kentucky), with Presiding Bishop Henry St. George Tucker as chief consecrator. In 1947, he was involved in controversy over the remarriage of divorced persons. He retired in 1971.

== Bibliography ==
- The Bishop Speaks His Mind (1959)
- The History of the Cathedral Domain in the Diocese of Lexington (1967)
