= Bruce Caldwell (bishop) =

American bishop (1947–2025)

The Right Reverend Bruce Edward Caldwell
- Bishop of Wyoming
- Church: Episcopal Church
- Diocese: Wyoming
- Elected: June 7, 1997
- In office: 1997–2010
- Predecessor: Bob Jones
- Successor: John Sheridan Smylie
- Other post: Provisional Bishop of Lexington (2016–2018)

Orders
- Ordination: May 1979 by E. Paul Haynes
- Consecration: September 26, 1997 by James E. Krotz

Personal details
- Born: July 8, 1947 Painesville, Ohio, U.S.
- Died: April 13, 2025 (aged 77)
- Denomination: Anglican
- Parents: Robert M. Caldwell & Lois Caldwell
- Spouse: Brenda Caldwell

Bruce Edward Caldwell (July 8, 1947 – April 13, 2025) was an American bishop of the Episcopal Church who served as Bishop of Wyoming from 1997 to 2010.

== Early life and education ==
Caldwell was born on July 8, 1947, in Painesville, Ohio, the son of the Reverend Robert M. Caldwell and Lois Caldwell. He studied at the University of South Florida, graduating with a Bachelor of Arts, and then at the General Theological Seminary, graduating with a Master of Divinity in 1978.

== Ordained ministry ==
Caldwell was ordained deacon in June 1978 and priest in March 1979, by Bishop E. Paul Haynes. He then served as assistant at St John's Church in Tampa, Florida between 1978 and 1984, and then rector of St James' House of Prayer in Tampa between 1984 and 1989. Like his predecessor in Wyoming, Caldwell also spent time in Alaska between 1989 and 1991 serving as rector of St Stephen's Church in Fort Yukon. In 1991, he became rector of St George's Church in Bismarck, North Dakota, where he remained until 1997.

=== Episcopacy ===
On June 7, 1997, during a convention held in St Matthew's Cathedral, Caldwell was elected the eighth Bishop of Wyoming on the fourth ballot. He was then consecrated on September 26, 1997, by Bishop James E. Krotz of Nebraska. A year after his installation, he presided at the funeral service for Matthew Shepard. After retirement from Wyoming in 2010, Caldwell also served as assistant bishop in the Diocese of New York and as interim dean of St. Mark's Cathedral in Minneapolis, Minnesota. In 2016, Caldwell was called upon to serve as bishop provisional in the Diocese of Lexington after its diocesan bishop, Douglas Hahn, was suspended, and later resigned. Caldwell served the diocese of Lexington until April 2018.

== Personal life and death ==
Caldwell's wife, the Rev. Brenda Ann Doyle Caldwell, died in 2023. They had two children and one granddaughter. Caldwell died on Palm Sunday, April 13, 2025, at the age of 77.

== See also ==
- List of Episcopal bishops of the United States
- Historical list of the Episcopal bishops of the United States
