= John Sheridan Smylie =

American priest

The Right Reverend John Sheridan Smylie
- Bishop of Wyoming
- Church: Episcopal Church
- Diocese: Wyoming
- Elected: March 20, 2010
- In office: 2010–2021
- Predecessor: Bruce Caldwell
- Successor: Paul-Gordon Chandler

Orders
- Ordination: 1982 by John Shelby Spong
- Consecration: July 31, 2010 by Katharine Jefferts Schori

Personal details
- Denomination: Anglican
- Spouse: Betsy Dawn Inskeep (died 1999); Jill Smylie
- Children: 2

John Sheridan Smylie served as the ninth bishop of the Episcopal Diocese of Wyoming from 2010 to 2020.

== Biography ==
Smylie graduated with a Bachelor of Arts from Syracuse University, and a Master of Divinity from the Episcopal Divinity School in Cambridge, Massachusetts in 1981. He was ordained deacon in 1981, and priest in the Diocese of Newark in 1982. He served as associate rector of Calvary Church in Summit, New Jersey, and then rector of Trinity Church in Hamburg, New York. Between 1998 and 2005, he served as Dean of the Cathedral of St John the Evangelist in Spokane, Washington. Between 2007 and 2010, he served as rector of St Mark's Church in Casper, Wyoming.

He was elected bishop on March 20, 2010, consecrated on July 31, 2010, and installed in his cathedral on August 8, 2010.

He was married to the Reverend Betsy Dawn Inskeep Smylie, author and episcopal priest who served as missioner to the deaf for the Episcopal Diocese of Western New York from 1989 to the spring of 1998. Betsey died in 1999.

== See also ==
- List of Episcopal bishops of the United States
- Historical list of the Episcopal bishops of the United States
