= Daniel Pereira =

Daniel Pereira may refer to:

- Daniel Pereira (footballer, born 1976), Argentine-Uruguayan footballer
- Daniel Pereira (footballer, born 2000), Venezuelan footballer
- Daniel Pereira Dos Santos Cabral (1924–2008), Portuguese Anglican bishop

== See also ==
- Daniel Pereyra (born 1962), Uruguayan modern pentathlete
