= André Soares =

André Soares may refer to:

- André Soares (architect) (1720–1769), Portuguese sculptor and architect
- André Soares (bishop) (born 1956), Angolan Anglican bishop
- André Soares (fighter), Brazilian jiu-jitsu and mixed martial arts fighter
- André Soares (handballer) (born 1984), Brazilian handball player
- André Ricardo Soares (born 1981), Brazilian footballer
- André Soares (Portuguese footballer) (born 1990), Portuguese footballer
