= Addison Hosea =

Bishop of the Episcopal Diocese of Lexington

The Right Reverend Addison Hosea D.D.
- Bishop of Lexington
- Church: Episcopal Church
- Diocese: Lexington
- Elected: February 10, 1970
- In office: 1971–1985
- Predecessor: William R. Moody
- Successor: Don Wimberly
- Previous post: Coadjutor Bishop of Lexington (1970-1971)

Orders
- Ordination: June 23, 1949 by Tom Wright
- Consecration: May 12, 1970 by William R. Moody

Personal details
- Born: September 11, 1914 Pikeville, North Carolina, United States
- Died: December 14, 1985 (aged 71) Lexington, Kentucky, United States
- Buried: Lexington Cemetery
- Denomination: Anglican
- Spouse: Jane Eubank Marston
- Children: 3
- Education: Atlantic Christian College

Addison Hosea (September 11, 1914 - December 14, 1985) was an American prelate who served as the forth Bishop of Lexington from 1971 to 1985.

== Early life and education ==
Hosea was born on September 11, 1914, in Pikeville, North Carolina, the son of Addison Hosea and Alma Bowden. He was educated at the Pikeville High School, before studying at the University of North Carolina, from 1930 to 1931. He later studied at Atlantic Christian College, from where he graduated with a Bachelor of Arts in 1938. Between 1932 and 1934, and again from 1938 till 1941, he taught in various school in North Carolina. On June 24, 1944, he married Jane Eubank Marston, and together had three children. He enrolled at Sewanee: The University of the South and earned a Bachelor of Divinity in 1949. He was awarded a Doctor of Divinity from the University of the South in 1970 and another from the Episcopal Theological Seminary in Kentucky in 1968.

== Ordained ministry ==
Hosea was ordained deacon in December 1948 and then priest on June 23, 1949, by Bishop Tom Wright of East Carolina. After ordination, he became priest-in-charge of St Gabriel's Church in Faison, North Carolina, a post he kept till 1951, and subsequently, between 1949 and 1954, rector of St Paul's Church in Clinton, North Carolina. During his time in North Carolina, he also directed the diocesan youth camp and, later, the department of Christian Education. In 1954, he moved to Versailles, Kentucky and became rector of St John's Church, a post he retained till 1970. Subsequently, from 1954 till 1959 and 1965 till 1970, he was Professor of New Testament Language and Literature at the Episcopal Theological Seminary in Kentucky.

== Episcopacy ==
On February 10, 1970, at a Special Convention of the Diocese of Lexington, Hosea was elected Coadjutor Bishop of Lexington. He was consecrated on May 12, 1970, in Christ Church, Lexington, Kentucky, by the Bishop of Lexington William R. Moody. He succeeded as diocesan bishop in 1971 and retained the post till his retirement in November 1985, a month before his death on December 14, 1985, at the University of Kentucky Hospital.
