= Episcopal Diocese of Lexington =

Episcopal Church diocese in Kentucky

Coordinates: 37°50′N 83°30′W

Diocese of Lexington Diocesis Lexingtonensis

Location
- Country: United States
- Ecclesiastical province: Province IV

Statistics
- Congregations: 34 (2024)
- Members: 6,186 (2023)

Information
- Denomination: Episcopal Church
- Established: December 4, 1895
- Cathedral: Christ Church Cathedral
- Language: English

Current leadership
- Bishop: David Sibley (ordination pending January 2027)

Map
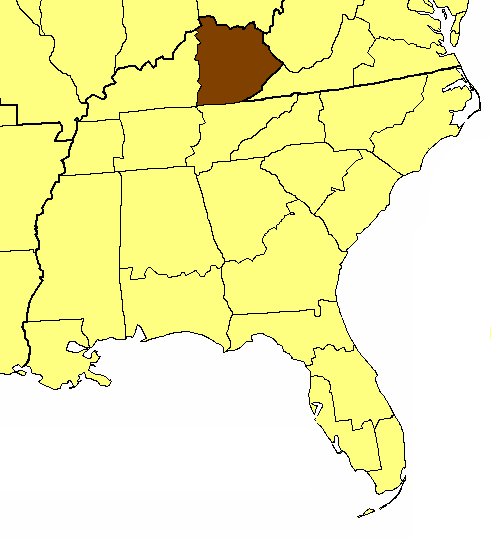
- Location of the Diocese of Lexington

Website
- diolex.org

The Episcopal Diocese of Lexington is the diocese of the Episcopal Church with jurisdiction over eastern Kentucky. It was created in 1895 from the Diocese of Kentucky which continues to have jurisdiction of the western portion of the state. The cathedral for the Diocese of Kentucky is located in Louisville. The Diocese of Lexington is in Province 4 and its cathedral, Christ Church Cathedral, is in Lexington, as are the diocesan offices.

The diocese's greatest membership strength is in the Bluegrass region in and around Lexington, with a smaller pocket of strength in the Northern Kentucky suburbs of Cincinnati. The diocese has several small congregations in the Appalachian portion of the state. In 2024, the diocese reported average Sunday attendance (ASA) of 2,027 persons, down from 2,854 in 2015. Reported membership declined from 6,923 in 2015 to 6,186 in 2023. No membership statistics were reported in 2024 national parochial reports. The 34 reporting congregations of the diocese had $6,607,328 in plate and pledge income in 2024.

== Bishops of Lexington ==
	Name	Date	Notes
I	Lewis W. Burton	1896–1928	
II	Henry Pryor Almon Abbott	1929–1945	
III	William R. Moody	1945–1971	Addison Hosea, bishop coadjutor 1970 - 1971
IV	Addison Hosea	1971–1985	Don A. Wimberly, bishop coadjutor 1984–1985
V	Don A. Wimberly	1985–1999	Wimberly was translated to the Diocese of Texas.
	Rogers S. Harris	1999–2000	Assisting Bishop
VI	Stacy F. Sauls	2000–2011	Sauls was named COO of The Episcopal Church.
	Chilton R. Knudsen	2011–2012	Interim Bishop
VII	Douglas Hahn	2012–2016	Hahn suspended March 9, 2016.
	Bruce Edward Caldwell	2016–2018	Provisional Bishop
VIII	Mark Van Koevering	2018–2026	Provisional from 2018 to 2019, elected diocesan bishop, 1 Nov. 2019
	Jeffrey Lee	2026	Assisting Bishop
IX	David C. Sibley	January 2027-	Elected August 1, 2026

== Bishop ==
The Rt. Rev. Mark Van Koevering was consecrated as Bishop of Niassa, Mozambique, part of the Anglican Church of Southern Africa, in 2003, where he served until November 2015. In November 2015, he moved back to the United States, to become the assistant bishop at the Episcopal Diocese of West Virginia. He served there until April 2018 when he became the provisional bishop of the Diocese of Lexington. He became eligible to be the diocesan bishop after a period of shared ministry, prayer, and review. On 1 November 2019 at a special convention of the diocese, Bishop Van Koevering was elected diocesan bishop. On 7 October 2024, Bishop Van Koevering announced his intention to resign upon the installation of his successor in late 2026.

On August 1, 2026, the diocese elected the Rev. David C. Sibley as ninth bishop.

== Departure of Bishop Hahn and call of Bishop Caldwell ==
Bruce Edward Caldwell was called to serve as Bishop Provisional on June 1, 2016. He was named to the temporary post after his predecessor, the Rt. Rev. Douglas Hahn, was suspended and later resigned.

== List of parishes and locations ==
Location	Church
Ashland	Calvary
Barnes Mountain	St. Timothy's
Beattyville	St. Thomas
Clark County	St. Hubert's
Corbin	St. John's
Covington	Trinity
Cynthiana	Advent
Danville	Trinity
Flemingsburg	St. Francis'
Florence	Grace
Fort Thomas	St. Andrew's
Frankfort	Ascension
Georgetown	Holy Trinity
Harlan	Christ Church
Harrodsburg	St. Philip's
Hazard	St. Mark's
Jessamine County	Resurrection
Lexington	Christ Church Cathedral
Lexington	Good Shepherd
Lexington	St. Andrew's
Lexington	Grace United/St. Martha's
Lexington	St. Michael's
Lexington	St. Raphael's
Lexington	St. Augustine's Chapel (Campus Ministry)
Lexington	Walnut Hill
Madison County	Our Saviour
Maysville	Nativity
Middlesboro	St. Mary's
Morehead	St. Alban's
Mount Sterling	Ascension
Newport	St. Paul's
Paris	St. Peter's
Prestonsburg	St. James
Somerset	St. Patrick's
Versailles	St. John's
Winchester	Emmanuel

In addition to these parishes and missions, there are other ministries of the diocese that have attached chapels. The college ministry at the University of Kentucky is located at St. Augustine's Chapel in Lexington. St. Agnes' House in Lexington was "a nonprofit, ecumenical mission providing economical lodging for patients and their caregivers who have traveled to Lexington, Kentucky seeking treatment for serious illnesses at area hospitals and other medical care facilities." St. Agnes' House closed in late 2017.

The Diocese of Lexington also has a co-cathedral located at the diocesan camp and conference center, the Cathedral Domain, in Lee County. It is called the Cathedral of St. George the Martyr.

The diocese previously supported a literacy ministry called Reading Camp. Reading Camp was a free, week-long camp for kids going into third, fourth or fifth grade who could use help getting their reading to, or near to, grade-level. Reading Camp built both reading skills and self-confidence through a summer camp atmosphere. Individual Reading Camps still exist throughout the diocese and abroad.

== See also ==
- Historical list of bishops of the Episcopal Church in the United States of America
