= Diocese of Nampula =

Diocese of Nampula may refer to:

- Roman Catholic Archdiocese of Nampula
- Diocese of Nampula, Anglican Church of Mozambique and Angola
