= David Thornberry =

The Right Reverend David Ritchie Thornberry D.D.
- Bishop of Wyoming
- Church: Episcopal Church
- Diocese: Wyoming
- Elected: 1969
- In office: 1969–1977
- Predecessor: James Wilson Hunter
- Successor: Bob Gordon Jones

Orders
- Ordination: April 24, 1937 by Henry Hobson
- Consecration: May 1, 1969 by John E. Hines

Personal details
- Born: June 11, 1911 Baltimore, Maryland, United States
- Died: June 27, 1995 (aged 84) Readmond Township, Michigan, United States
- Denomination: Anglican
- Parents: David Wilson Thornberry & Ann Frances Odin Hulbert
- Spouse: Virginia Lee Morrissett (m. 1940)
- Children: 2

David Ritchie Thornberry (June 11, 1911 – June 27, 1995) was the sixth bishop of the Episcopal Diocese of Wyoming from 1969 to 1977.

== Early life and education ==
Thornberry was born in Rawlins, Wyoming on June 11, 1911, to the Reverend David Wilson Thornberry (1866-1964) and Ann Frances Odin Hulbert Thornberry (1883-1971). He was educated at the public schools of Laramie, Wyoming, where the family had moved in 1913 after his father became Dean of St Matthew's Cathedral. He studied at the University of Wyoming, and then at Kenyon College from where he graduated in 1933 with a Bachelor of Arts. Later, he enrolled at Bexley Hall, where he trained for the priesthood. He transferred to the Episcopal Theological Seminary, graduating in 1936 with a Bachelor of Divinity. Thornberry was awarded an honorary Doctor of Divinity degree from Kenyon in 1957.

== Ordained ministry ==
Thornberry was ordained deacon on June 14, 1936, and priest on April 24, 1937, by Bishop Henry Hobson of Southern Ohio. Between 1936 and 1940, he served as curate at Christ Church in Dayton, Ohio, subsequently vicar of St Mark's Church in Harrison, Ohio between 1938 and 1940. He married Virginia Lee Morrissett on November 23, 1940, and eventually had two children. Thornberry was appointed rector of Grace Church in Cincinnati in 1940, and remained so until 1952 when he was appointed Archdeacon of Southern Ohio. Between 1965 and 1969, he was rector of Christ Church in Shaker Heights, Ohio.

== Bishop of Wyoming ==
Thornberry was elected Bishop of Wyoming in 1969, and was consecrated on May 1, 1969, with Presiding Bishop John E. Hines as chief consecrator. He served in Wyoming until his retirement on October 31, 1977. He died at his home in Readmond Township, Michigan on June 27, 1995.
