= Elmer N. Schmuck =

The Right Reverend Elmer Nicholas Schmuck D.D.
- Bishop of Wyoming
- Church: Episcopal Church
- Diocese: Wyoming
- Elected: October 2, 1929
- In office: 1929–1936
- Predecessor: Nathaniel S. Thomas
- Successor: Winfred Hamlin Ziegler

Orders
- Ordination: September 19, 1906 by Samuel Cook Edsall
- Consecration: December 13, 1929 by Charles P. Anderson

Personal details
- Born: July 27, 1882 Peoria, Illinois, United States
- Died: April 28, 1936 (aged 53) Laramie, Wyoming, United States
- Buried: St Matthew's Cathedral
- Denomination: Anglican
- Parents: George Schmuck & Rosa Bertha Schuette
- Spouse: Katherine Currie (m. 1905)
- Education: Seabury-Western Theological Seminary

Elmer Nicholas Schmuck (July 27, 1882 - April 28, 1936) was the third bishop of the Episcopal Diocese of Wyoming.

== Biography ==
Schmuck was born on July 27, 1882, in Peoria, Illinois, son of George Schmuck and Rosa Bertha Schuette. Following education at Seabury-Western Theological Seminary, he married Katherine Currie in 1905. He was ordained deacon on May 28, 1905, and priest on September 19, 1906, by Bishop Samuel Cook Edsall of Minnesota.

He was rector of St Paul's Church in Owatonna, Minnesota from 1906 to 1911, and rector of St John's Church in Linden Hills, Minneapolis from 1911 to 1923. After two years as rector of St Mark's Church in Denver, Colorado, he was elected Missionary Bishop of Wyoming on October 2, 1929. He was consecrated bishop on December 13, 1929, in the Chapel of the Mediator in Philadelphia by Presiding Bishop Charles P. Anderson. He was the only bishop consecrated by Presiding Bishop Anderson during his short primacy. Schmuck was awarded a Doctor of Divinity from Seabury in 1927. He died in office on April 28, 1936, and was buried in the cathedral close.
