= Manuel Ernesto =

Mozambican Anglican bishop:

Manuel Ernesto is a Mozambican Anglican bishop: he was previously Suffragan Bishop of Diocese of Niassa and since 2019 the inaugural bishop of the Missionary Diocese of Nampula.
