= Elisha Smith Thomas =

Bishop of Kansas, United States from 1889 to 1895

The Right Reverend Elisha Smith Thomas D.D.
- Bishop of Kansas
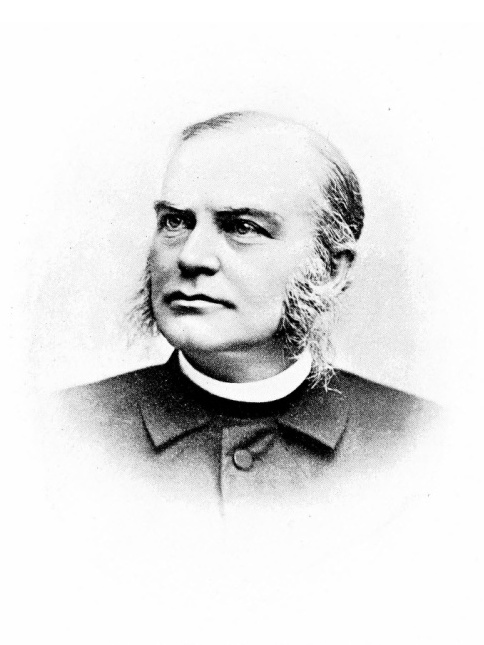
- Church: Episcopal Church
- Diocese: Kansas
- Elected: February 2, 1887
- In office: 1889-1895
- Predecessor: Thomas Hubbard Vail
- Successor: Frank Rosebrook Millspaugh

Orders
- Ordination: April 5, 1862 by John Williams
- Consecration: May 4, 1887 by Henry Benjamin Whipple

Personal details
- Born: March 2, 1834 Wickford, Rhode Island, United States
- Died: March 9, 1895 (aged 61)
- Buried: Elm Grove Cemetery, North Kingstown, Rhode Island
- Denomination: Anglican
- Parents: Allen Mason Thomas & Charlotte Smith
- Spouse: Georgine Mary Brown (m. 1861)
- Children: 1

Elisha Smith Thomas (March 2, 1834 – March 9, 1895) was the second bishop of the Episcopal Diocese of Kansas from 1889 to his death. His son, Nathaniel S. Thomas, became the second bishop of Wyoming in the Episcopal Church.

== Early life and education ==
Thomas was born on March 2, 1834, in Wickford, Rhode Island, the son of Allen Mason Thomas and Charlotte Smith. He was educated at Yale University, graduating in 1858. In 1859 he taught in a 'Deaf and Dumb Asylum' in Baton Rouge, Louisiana, while in 1869 he spent time travelling around Europe. He then enrolled to study theology at Berkeley Divinity School and graduated in 1861. In 1887, Yale awarded him with an honorary Doctor of Divinity.

== Ordained ministry ==
Thomas was ordained deacon on May 17, 1861, by Bishop Thomas M. Clark at St Paul's Church in Wickford, Rhode Island, and then priest on April 5, 1862, at St Paul's Church in New Haven, Connecticut, by Bishop John Williams. On October 2, 1861, he married Georgine M. Brown. Between 1861 and 1864, he served as rector of St Paul's Church in New Haven, Connecticut, and then in 1864, he was elected rector of Seabury Divinity School in Faribault, Minnesota, and in 1865 he became Professor of Biblical Exegesis and Hebrew. In 1869 he spent time abroad studying the Semitic languages. While at Seabury he directed many seminarians in service at the Church of the Advent in Farmington, Minnesota, which has a stained glass window dedicated to him.

In 1870 he became rector of St. Mark's Church in Minneapolis and in 1876 he transferred to St. Paul's Church in St. Paul, Minnesota.

== Bishop ==
Thomas was elected Assistant Bishop of Kansas on the first ballot on February 2, 1887. He was consecrated on May 4, 1887, in St Paul's Church, Saint Paul, Minnesota, by Bishop Henry Benjamin Whipple of Minnesota. He succeeded as diocesan bishop on October 6, 1889. In 1895, the bishop died in office on a visit to St. John's Military School which he had founded in Salina, Kansas.
