= IAMA =

IAMA may refer to:

- Iama Island, Queensland, an island and a locality in the Torres Strait Island Region, Australia
- Igreja Anglicana de Moçambique e Angola, a province of the Anglican Communion in Angola and Mozambique
- International Acoustic Music Awards
- Iranian American Medical Association
- r/IAmA, a Reddit community for question-and-answer interactive interviews
