= Diocese of Lexington =

Diocese of Lexington can refer to either of two dioceses in Lexington, Kentucky:

- Episcopal Diocese of Lexington, a diocese of the Episcopal Church
- Diocese of Lexington, a diocese of the Catholic Church
