= Winfred Hamlin Ziegler =

Bishop of the Episcopal Diocese of Wyoming

The Right Reverend Winfred Hamlin Ziegler D.D., S.T.D.
- Bishop of Wyoming
- Church: Episcopal Church
- Diocese: Wyoming
- Elected: October 1936
- In office: 1936–1949
- Predecessor: Elmer N. Schmuck
- Successor: James Wilson Hunter

Orders
- Ordination: May 1913 by Peter Trimble Rowe
- Consecration: December 16, 1936 by George Craig Stewart

Personal details
- Born: November 23, 1885 Detroit, Michigan, United States
- Died: July 6, 1972 (aged 86) Salt Lake City, Utah, United States
- Buried: Pinedale Cemetery, Pinedale, Wyoming
- Denomination: Anglican
- Parents: Paul Ziegler & Mary Frances Bell
- Spouse: Marie Eleanor Bartron (m. 1911)
- Children: 5
- Education: Columbia University; Seabury-Western Theological Seminary

Winfred Hamlin Ziegler (November 23, 1885 - July 6, 1972) was the fourth bishop of the Episcopal Diocese of Wyoming from 1936 to 1949.

== Early life and education ==
Ziegler was born on November 23, 1885, in Detroit, Michigan, the son of the Reverend Paul Ziegler and Mary Frances Bell. He was educated at the Detroit Church Academy, after which he worked as a hardware salesman between 1899 and 1907. He then studied at Columbia University, where he was a member of the Philolexian Society, and graduating with a Bachelor of Arts in 1911. He earned a Bachelor of Sacred Theology from Seabury-Western Theological Seminary in 1929. He was awarded a Doctor of Divinity 1936, and a Doctor of Sacred Theology in 1937.

== Ordained ministry ==
Following his studies at Columbia, Ziegler went to Alaska to serve as a lay missionary. He was then ordained deacon in March 1912 and priest in May 1913 by Bishop Peter Trimble Rowe of Alaska. He ministered Valdez, Alaska until 1914, when he transferred to the Olympic Peninsula Missions in Washington, remaining till 1915. Between 1915 and 1918, he was vicar of All Saints' Church in Lehighton, Pennsylvania, while between 1918 and 1923, he served as Dean of St John's Cathedral in Albuquerque, New Mexico, and Archdeacon of New Mexico. SHe also served as chaplain with the 14th Division of the United States Army between 1918 and 1919. In 1923, he became rector of the Church of the Redeemer in Elgin, Illinois, remaining till 1931, when he became Archdeacon of Chicago.

== Bishop ==
Ziegler was elected Missionary Bishop of Wyoming in October 1936. He was consecrated Bishop of the Missionary District of Wyoming by Bishop George Craig Stewart of Chicago on December 16, 1936, in St Matthew's Cathedral, Laramie. He retired in 1949 and moved to California. He died in a hospital in Salt Lake City on July 6, 1972.
