= Ethelbert Talbot =

American Episcopal bishop

The Most Reverend Ethelbert Talbot
- 15th Presiding Bishop of the Episcopal Church
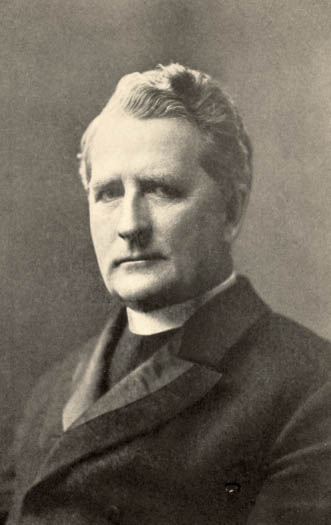
- Talbot in 1906
- Church: Episcopal Church
- In office: 1924–1926
- Predecessor: Alexander Charles Garrett
- Successor: John Gardner Murray
- Other post: Bishop of Bethlehem (1905-1928)
- Previous posts: Bishop of Idaho (1887-1898); Bishop of Wyoming (1887-1898); Bishop of Central Pennsylvania (1898-1904)

Orders
- Ordination: November 4, 1873 by Charles Franklin Robertson
- Consecration: May 27, 1887 by Henry Benjamin Whipple

Personal details
- Born: October 9, 1848 Fayette, Missouri, United States
- Died: February 27, 1928 (aged 79) Tuckahoe, New York, United States
- Buried: Nisky Hill Cemetery, Bethlehem, Pennsylvania
- Denomination: Anglican
- Parents: John Alnut Talbot & Alice Daly
- Spouse: Dora Frances Harvey
- Children: 1

Ethelbert Talbot (October 9, 1848 – February 27, 1928) was the fifteenth presiding bishop of the Episcopal Church. He is credited with inspiring Pierre de Coubertin to coin the phrase, "The important thing in the Olympic Games is not so much the winning but taking part, for the essential thing in life is not conquering but fighting well."

== Biography ==
Talbot was born in Fayette, Missouri on October 9, 1848. He was the son of John Alnut Talbot, a physician, and Alice Daly Talbot.

He graduated from Dartmouth in 1870 and went directly to the General Theological Seminary from which he graduated in 1873. He was ordained to the diaconate on June 29 and the priesthood on November 4 of that year. The next day he married Dora Frances Havery of Roanoke, Missouri. They later had one child, Anne. He immediately became rector of St. James Church in Macon, Missouri. He built several missions in nearby towns, and founded a school which became St. James Military Academy. It began as a boys' school, but a parallel girls' school was founded later.

In 1886, General Convention elected him the first Missionary Bishop of Wyoming and Idaho. He was consecrated in Christ Church, St. Louis on May 27, 1887. That year, the University of Missouri made him an honorary Doctor of Law and General Theological Seminary, a Doctor of Sacred Theology. In 1888 Dartmouth followed with a Doctor of Divinity.

When he arrived in his see, there were only four clergy in each of the two states. In the ten years in the West, he established 38 churches and built St. Matthew's Cathedral in Laramie, Wyoming. This was still the Old West and the story is told of his encounter with bandits while riding in a stage coach,

“Surely you wouldn’t rob a poor bishop?” said Talbot.

“Did you say you were a bishop?” asked the bandit.
“Yes, just a poor bishop.”
“What church?”
“The Episcopal.”
“The hell you are! Why that’s the church I belong to! Go along, driver.”

In 1891 he was elected Bishop of Georgia, but declined. On November 11, 1897, he was elected 3rd Bishop of the Episcopal Diocese of Central Pennsylvania, and installed on February 2, 1898. He set about planning for the division of the large diocese, and in 1904 the new Diocese of Harrisburg was established. Talbot remained Bishop of Central Pennsylvania and continued ministering in the area as Bishop of the Episcopal Diocese of Bethlehem following the renaming of the diocese in 1909. He held the see concurrently with his position as Bishop of Wyoming until 1908.

In the summer of 1908, he attended the Lambeth Conference, a gathering in London of 247 Anglican bishops from all over the world. The meeting coincided with the Olympic Games. The games were very contentious, with many American protests against British rulings. Talbot was aware of this and it concerned him. He was invited to preach at St Paul's Cathedral on July 19, a service to which athletes and officials of the games were specially invited. In his sermon, he said,

“We have just been contemplating the great Olympic Games. What does it mean? It means that young men of robust physical life have come from all parts of the world. It does mean, I think, as someone has said, that this era of internationalism as seen in the Stadium has an element of danger. Of course, it is very true, as he says, that each athlete strives not only for the sake of sport, but for the sake of his country. Thus a new rivalry is invented. If England be beaten on the river, or America outdistanced on the racing path, or that American has lost the strength which she once possessed. Well, what of it? The only safety after all lies in the lesson of the real Olympia — that the Games themselves are better than the race and the prize. St. Paul tells us how insignificant is the prize, Our prize is not corruptible, but incorruptible, and though only one may wear the laurel wreath, all may share the equal joy of the contest. All encouragement, therefore, be given to the exhilarating — I might also say soul-saving — interest that comes in active and fair and clean athletic sports.” (emphasis added)

Pierre Coubertin, the father of the modern Olympic movement, paraphrased Talbot in a speech the following Friday, "The importance of these Olympiads is not so much to win as to take part." The sentence has been paraphrased and modified over time, but remains an important part of the Olympic ideals.

Talbot remained Bishop of the Diocese of Bethlehem until 1927, obtaining the assistance of Frank W. Starrett, who was elected Bishop Coadjutor in 1923. On February 18, 1924, upon the death of Alexander C. Garrett, Talbot became the last Presiding Bishop to hold the post as a result of his seniority as a bishop. On January 1, 1926, John G. Murray became the first elected Presiding Bishop, succeeding Talbot. Talbot resigned his post as Bishop of Bethlehem in favor of Frank W. Sterrett on September 15, 1927, and died on February 27, 1928, in Tuckahoe, New York.

== See also ==
- List of presiding bishops of the Episcopal Church in the United States of America
- List of Episcopal bishops of the United States
- Historical list of the Episcopal bishops of the United States

Episcopal Church (USA) titles
Preceded by Alexander Charles Garrett	15th Presiding Bishop; February 18, 1924–January 1, 1926	Succeeded by John Gardner Murray
Preceded by Daniel S. Tuttle	2nd Bishop of Idaho; 1887–1898	Succeeded by James Bowen Funsten
New diocese	1st Bishop of Wyoming; 1887–1898	Succeeded by Nathaniel S. Thomas
Preceded by Nelson Somerville Rulison	3rd Bishop of Bethlehem; 1898–1927	Succeeded by Frank W. Sterrett
