= Nathaniel S. Thomas =

Bishop of the Episcopal Diocese of Wyoming

The Right Reverend Nathaniel Seymour Thomas D.D., LL.D.
- Bishop of Wyoming
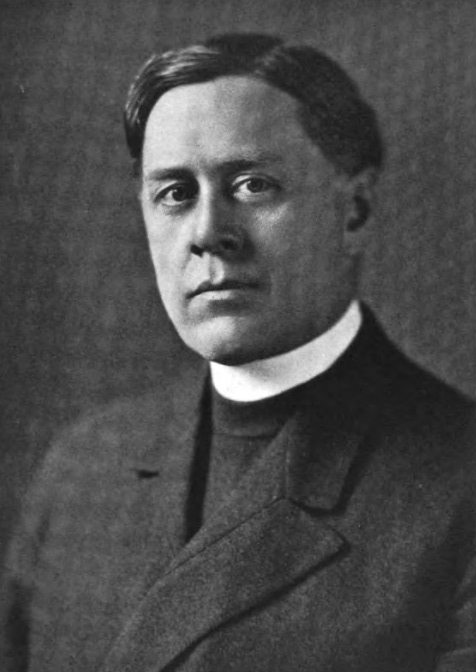
- Church: Episcopal Church
- Diocese: Wyoming
- Elected: February 27, 1909
- In office: 1909–1927
- Predecessor: Ethelbert Talbot
- Successor: Elmer N. Schmuck

Orders
- Ordination: May 28, 1893 by Elisha Smith Thomas
- Consecration: May 6, 1909 by Daniel S. Tuttle

Personal details
- Born: June 30, 1867 Faribault, Minnesota, United States
- Died: April 1, 1937 (aged 69) Palm Beach, Florida, United States
- Buried: Santa Barbara Cemetery
- Denomination: Anglican
- Parents: Elisha Smith Thomas & Georgine Mary Brown
- Spouse: Edith Ellsworth Prince (m. 1896)

Nathaniel Seymour Thomas (June 30, 1867 - April 1, 1937) was second bishop of the Episcopal Diocese of Wyoming, serving from 1909 to 1927.

== Early life and education ==
Thomas was born on June 30, 1867, in Faribault, Minnesota, the son of the Reverend Elisha Smith Thomas, later Bishop of Kansas, and Georgine Mary Brown. He was educated in Minneapolis, and Saint Paul, before studying at the University of Minnesota and graduating with a Bachelor of Arts in 1890. He then became chair of English literature in St. John's Military School, where he remained until 1891. He pursued his theological studies first at the University of Cambridge in England, and then at the Kansas Theological School.

== Ordained ministry ==
Thomas was ordained deacon on October 5, 1891, at Grace Cathedral, and priest on May 28, 1893, at Grace Church in Ottawa, Kansas, on both occasions by his father Elisha Smith Thomas. He served at Grace Church in Ottawa, Kansas, before becoming chaplain at College of the Sisters of Bethany in Topeka, Kansas. He also became professor of Pastoral Care at the Philadelphia Divinity School, while in 1894, he became rector of St Paul's Church in Leavenworth, Kansas. Between 1897 and 1899, he served as rector of St Matthew's Church in Wheeling, West Virginia, while between 1899 and 1909, he was rector of the Church of the Holy Apostles in Philadelphia.

== Bishop ==
Thomas was elected Bishop of the Missionary District of Salina in April 1902, however he declined the election. He was once more elected bishop in September 1904, this time of the Episcopal Diocese of Kentucky, however, he once more declined the election. On February 27, 1909, Thomas was elected Missionary Bishop of Wyoming, a post which he accepted. He was consecrated on May 6, 1909, with Presiding Bishop Daniel S. Tuttle as principal consecrator. He resigned on June 1, 1927, and became chairman of the board of oversees at the Philadelphia Divinity School. Between 1928 and 1930, he also served as the Bishop in charge of the Convocation of American Churches in Europe. In 1928, he also became rector of the Church of Bethesda by the Sea in Palm Beach, Florida. He died in Palm Beach on April 1, 1937, 1937.
