= James Wilson Hunter =

Bishop of the Episcopal Diocese of Wyoming

The Right Reverend James Wilson Hunter D.D.
- Bishop of Wyoming
- Church: Episcopal Church
- Diocese: Wyoming
- Elected: 1947
- In office: 1949–1969
- Predecessor: Winfred Hamlin Ziegler
- Successor: David Thornberry
- Previous post: Coadjutor Bishop of Wyoming (1948-1949)

Orders
- Ordination: May 1928 by John Gardner Murray
- Consecration: April 7, 1948 by Henry Knox Sherrill

Personal details
- Born: April 4, 1904 Baltimore, Maryland, United States
- Died: 1987
- Denomination: Anglican
- Parents: William Curtis Hunter & Beryl Gertrude Wilson
- Spouse: Nancy McCormick Wattles (m. 1928)
- Children: 3
- Education: Johns Hopkins University; Virginia Theological Seminary

James Wilson Hunter (April 4, 1904 – 1987) was an American prelate of the Episcopal Church, who served as Bishop of Wyoming between 1949 and 1969.

== Early life and education ==
Hunter was born in Baltimore, Maryland on April 4, 1904, the son of William Curtis Hunter and Beryl Gertrude Wilson. He attended Baltimore City College, graduating in 1921. He also graduated with a Bachelor of Arts from Johns Hopkins University in 1925, and with a Bachelor of Divinity from the Virginia Theological Seminary in 1928. The seminary awarded him a Doctor of Divinity in 1948.

== Ordained ministry ==
Hunter was ordained deacon in June 1927 and priest in May 1928, by Presiding Bishop John Gardner Murray. He married Nancy McCormick Wattles on October 18, 1928, and together had three children. He served as student-in-charge, then as deacon-in-charge, and then rector of St Barnabas' Church in Sykesville, Maryland between 1926 and 1929. He was then rector of St Andrew's Church in Fort Thomas, Kentucky and minister-in-charge of St Stephen's Church in Latonia, Covington between 1930 and 1938. In 1938, he became rector of St Andrew's Church in Louisville, Kentucky, and in 1946, rector of St Mark's Church in San Antonio, Texas.

== Bishop ==
Hunter was elected Coadjutor Bishop of Wyoming in 1947, and was consecrated on April 7, 1948, by Presiding Bishop Henry Knox Sherrill. He succeeded as diocesan bishop in 1949, and retired on May 1, 1969.
