= St Augustine's Cathedral, Maciene =

Anglican church in Mozambique

Coordinates: 25°02′12″S 33°51′59″E

St Augustine's Cathedral, Maciene is an Anglican church in the Diocese of Lebombo, Mozambique. The current incumbent is The Right Rev. Judas Chano Moda.
