= John Boys (bishop) =

British Anglican bishop

John Boys (17 January 1900 – 26 December 1972) was a British Anglican bishop who served as the fourth Bishop of Kimberley and Kuruman from 1951 until 1960.

He was educated at St Olave's Grammar School and Hatfield College, Durham and, after a business career, ordained in 1935. His first post was as a curate in Egham Hythe after which he was appointed the Bishop of Gibraltar’s personal chaplain. From there he went to South Africa (where he continued his career as a missionary). He later became Archdeacon of Lebombo, and in 1948 Bishop. Translated to Kimberley and Kuruman in 1951 he served the Diocese with distinction until ill health forced him to resign nine years later. In retirement he lived in London; he was Director of the South African Church Institute of London (1961–1969) and as the Archbishop of Cape Town's episcopal commissary until his own death. Additionally, he also served as a Canon of St Albans Cathedral and an Assistant Bishop of St Albans (1961–1968) and then as an Assistant Bishop of Southwark from 1968 until death.

Anglican Church of Southern Africa titles
Preceded by Dennis Victor	Bishop of Lebombo; 1948 – 1951	Succeeded by Humphry Beevor
Preceded by John Hunter	Bishop of Kimberley and Kuruman; 1951 – 1960	Succeeded by Philip Wheeldon
