= Basil Peacey =

Basil William Peacey (1889–1969) was the fourth Bishop of Lebombo from 1929 until 1935.

He was educated at Christ's Hospital and Leeds University. After a period of study at the College of the Resurrection, Mirfield, Peacey was ordained in 1912. His first post was as a Curate in Hull. Then he emigrated to South Africa to be Priest-Vicar of the Grahamstown Cathedral. His next post was as Priest in charge of Pessene in Maputoland followed by Principal of St Christopher's College Hlamankulu, where he was later appointed to the episcopate. Peacey next served as Rector of Krugersdorp and then Constantia before he retired in 1954.

Anglican Communion titles
Preceded by Leonard Fisher	Bishop of Lemombo; 1929 – 1935	Succeeded by Dennis Victor
