= Bob Jones (bishop) =

American Episcopalian prelate (1932–2026)

The Right Reverend Bob Jones
- Bishop of Wyoming
- Church: Episcopal Church
- Diocese: Wyoming
- Elected: June 25, 1977
- In office: 1977–1996
- Predecessor: David Thornberry
- Successor: Bruce Caldwell

Orders
- Ordination: 1960 by Robert R. Brown
- Consecration: October 31, 1977 by John Allin

Personal details
- Born: August 22, 1932 Paragould, Arkansas,U.S.
- Died: August 8, 2026 (aged 93)
- Denomination: Anglican
- Parents: F. H. Jones, Helen Truman Ellis
- Spouse: Judith Munroe (m. 1963)
- Children: 2

Bob Gordon Jones (August 22, 1932 – August 8, 2026) was an American prelate of the Episcopal Church, who served as the Bishop of Wyoming between 1977 and 1996.

== Early life and education ==
Jones was born in Paragould, Arkansas, on August 22, 1932, the son of F. H. Jones and Helen Truman Ellis. He graduated with a Bachelor of Business Administration degree from the University of Mississippi in 1956 and a Master of Divinity degree from the Seminary of the Southwest in 1959. The seminary also awarded him an honorary Doctor of Divinity degree in 1978. Jones served in the United States Navy during the Korean War from 1950 and 1955.

== Ordained ministry ==
Jones was ordained deacon on June 29, 1959, and became assistant to the Dean of Trinity Cathedral in Little Rock, Arkansas. While there, he was ordained a priest in 1960. In 1962 he left for Alaska, where he became vicar of the Church of St George-in-Arctic in Kotzebue, Alaska. In 1967, he became rector and vicar of St Christopher's Church in Anchorage, Alaska, where he remained until 1977.

== Bishop ==
Jones was elected Bishop of Wyoming on the fourth ballot of a special convention held on June 25, 1977. He was then consecrated on October 31, 1977, with Presiding Bishop John Allin as chief consecrator. He retired in 1996.

== Death ==
Jones died on August 8, 2026, at the age of 93.
