= Frank W. Sterrett =

American prelate (1885–1976)

The Right Reverend Frank William Sterrett D.D., S.T.D., LL.D.
- Bishop of Bethlehem
- Church: Episcopal Church
- Diocese: Bethlehem
- In office: 1928–1954
- Predecessor: Ethelbert Talbot
- Successor: Frederick J. Warnecke
- Previous post: Coadjutor Bishop of Bethlehem (1923-1928)

Orders
- Ordination: June 18, 1912 by Ethelbert Talbot
- Consecration: November 9, 1923 by Ethelbert Talbot

Personal details
- Born: January 21, 1885 Middleport, New York, United States
- Died: June 29, 1976 (aged 91) Dennis, Massachusetts, United States
- Buried: Union Cemetery, Quakertown, Pennsylvania
- Denomination: Anglican
- Parents: William J. Sterrett & Mary Elizabeth Spalding
- Spouse: Fredrica Lott Haring
- Children: 3

Frank William Sterrett (January 21, 1885 – June 29, 1976) was an American prelate who served as the Bishop of Bethlehem between 1928 till 1954.

== Education ==
Sterrett was born on January 21, 1885, in Middleport, New York, the son of William J. Sterrett and Mary Elizabeth Spalding. In 1901, he graduated from the high school in Middleport, after which he studied at Hobart College between 1903 and 1904. He then studied at the University of Buffalo Law School between 1904 and 1905. He also graduated with a Bachelor of Arts from the University of Pennsylvania in 1908 and a Bachelor of Divinity from Philadelphia Divinity School in 1911. He was awarded a Doctor of Divinity in 1924 and a Doctor of Laws in 1924 from Hobart College and another form Lehigh University in 1933. Lafayette College also awarded him a Doctor of Divinity in 1951.

== Ministry ==
Sterrett was ordained deacon in June 1911 by Bishop Alexander Mackay-Smith and priest in June 1912 by Bishop Ethelbert Talbot. He served as vicar of Grace Chapel in Kingston, Pennsylvania, between 1911 and 1912 after which he became assistant priest at Saint Stephen's Church in Wilkes-Barre, Pennsylvania. In 1915 he became rector of the same church where he remained till 1923.

== Bishop ==
He was elected Coadjutor Bishop of Bethlehem and was consecrated on November 9, 1923, by Ethelbert Talbot, Bishop of Bethlehem. He then succeeded as diocesan bishop on February 27, 1928, and retired in 1954. He served as diocesan bishop from 1928 to 1954. he died in 1976
