= Humphry Beevor =

Humphry Beevor (24 August 1903 – 12 June 1965) was the seventh Bishop of Lebombo.

He was educated at Winchester College and Oriel College, Oxford and ordained in 1929. His first post was as a curate at St Mark's Church, Swindon. He was then Librarian at Pusey House, Oxford, Chaplain of Shrewsbury School, and then a World War II Chaplain in the RNVR. From 1947 to 1950 he was editor of the Church Times then Priest in charge of St Mary and St George, West Wycombe. In 1952 he was elevated to the episcopate, serving for five years. After this he was chaplain at The King’s School, Canterbury. In 1961 he was appointed chaplain of St John's Church, Montreux, where he was also chaplain to St George’s School, Châtelard. He retired in 1964.

His stepson is Christopher Mackenzie-Beevor.

== Notes ==
Anglican Church of Southern Africa titles
Preceded by John Boys	Bishop of Lemombo; 1952– 1957	Succeeded by Stanley Chapman Pickard
