= Latimer Fuller =

Anglican colonial bishop (1870–1950)

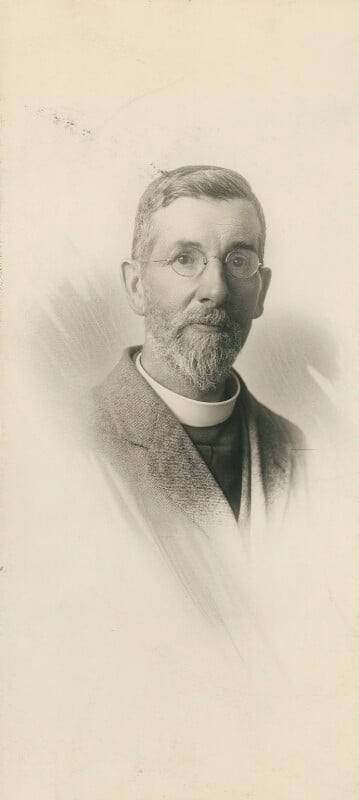
Fuller, c. 1910s

John Latimer Fuller (1870 – 1950) was an Anglican bishop, the second Bishop of Lebombo from 1913 until 1920.

John Latimer Fuller was educated at Emmanuel College, Cambridge, and ordained in 1893. Emigrating to South Africa in 1902 he was in charge of the Rand Native Mission, and then Archdeacon of the Northern Transvaal, before his elevation to the episcopate in 1913. Retiring as bishop of Lebombo in 1920, he was rector of Christ Church, Polokwane (in the then Pietersburg), and later chaplain to Khaiso School in Pietersburg before retiring in 1944.

He was known as Mafakudu, and is buried at Setotolwane Cemetery.

== Notes ==
Anglican Church of Southern Africa titles
Preceded by William Edmund Smyth	Bishop of Lemombo; 1913 – 1920	Succeeded by Leonard Noel Fisher
