= Dennis Victor =

Dennis Victor (died 7 January 1949) was the fifth bishop of Lebombo from 1936 until 1947. He was educated at Denstone College and Hatfield College, Durham and ordained in 1906. His first post was as a curate at the Church of the Ascension, Victoria Docks after which he emigrated to Nyasaland to be a missionary priest and then principal of its Teacher training college and finally (before his elevation to the episcopate) Archdeacon of Shire.

Anglican Church of Southern Africa titles
| Preceded by Basil William Peacey | Bishop of Lemombo; 1929 – 1935 | Succeeded by John Boys |
