= Edmund Smyth =

Anglican bishop

The Right Reverend Edmund Smyth
- Bishop of Lebombo
- Church: Church of the Province of Southern Africa
- Diocese: Diocese of Lebombo
- In office: 1893–1912
- Successor: Latimer Fuller

Orders
- Ordination: 1882 (deacon); 1883 (priest)
- Consecration: 5 November 1893

Personal details
- Born: 13 April 1858
- Died: 5 April 1950 (aged 91)
- Denomination: Anglicanism
- Education: King's College, Cambridge

William Edmund Smyth (1858–1950) was an Anglican bishop in the last decade of the nineteenth century and the first two of the twentieth.

== Biography ==
He was educated at Eton and King's College, Cambridge. Made a deacon in 1882 at Ely Cathedral and ordained priest in 1883 also at Ely his first posts were curacies at St Mary the Less, Cambridge and St Peter's, London Docks. Next he was chaplain to Douglas MacKenzie, Bishop of Zululand. From 1889 to 1892 he was a Missionary and Theological Tutor at Isandhlwana before elevation to the episcopate as the first Bishop of Lebombo. He was consecrated a bishop on 5 November 1893 in Grahamstown Cathedral, by the Bishops of Cape Town, of Bloemfontein, of Grahamstown, of Pretoria, of St John's, of Kaffraria and of Zululand. Retiring as bishop in 1912, he was warden of the Anglican Hostel at the South African Native College, now the University of Fort Hare until retirement in 1932.

== Notes and references ==
- Teague, Tom Richard (1955). A Memoir of William Edmund Smyth: First Bishop of Lebombo (Portuguese East Africa) 1893-1912 and First Warden of Beda Hall, Fort Hare University South Africa, 1920-1932. S.P.C.K..

Anglican Church of Southern Africa titles
New diocese	Bishop of Lebombo; 1893–1912	Succeeded by Latimer Fuller
