= Lewis W. Burton =

American bishop (1852–1940)

The Right Reverend Lewis William Burton D.D., LL.D.
- Bishop of Lexington
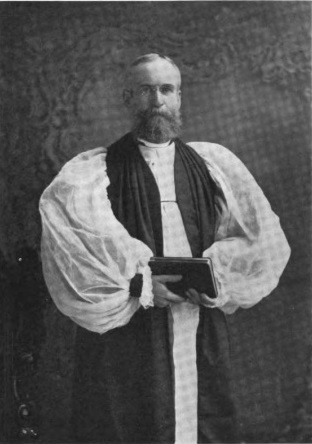
- Church: Episcopal Church
- Diocese: Lexington
- Elected: December 4, 1895
- In office: 1896–1928
- Successor: Henry Pryor Almon Abbott

Orders
- Ordination: May 15, 1878 by Gregory T. Bedell
- Consecration: January 30, 1896 by Thomas Underwood Dudley

Personal details
- Born: November 9, 1852 Cleveland, Ohio, United States
- Died: October 18, 1940 (aged 87) Lexington, Kentucky, United States
- Denomination: Anglican
- Parents: Lewis Burton & Agnes Jane Wallace
- Spouse: Géorgie Hendree Ball
- Children: 3
- Education: Kenyon College

Lewis William Burton (November 9, 1852 – October 18, 1940) was Bishop of Lexington in the Episcopal Church from 1896 to 1928.

== Early life and education ==
Burton was born on November 9, 1852, in Cleveland, Ohio, the son of the Reverend Lewis Burton and Agnes Jane Wallace. He studied at Kenyon College and graduated with a Bachelor of Arts with honors in 1873 and a Master of Arts in 1886. He also studied at the Philadelphia Divinity School and earned a Bachelor of Divinity in 1877. He married Géorgie Hendree Ball on January 15, 1883, and together had three children. He was awarded a Doctor of Divinity in 1896 from Kenyon College and from Sewanee: The University of the South, respectively. In addition, he also received an honorary Doctor of Laws from St John's College in 1917.,

== Ordained ministry ==
Burton was ordained deacon on June 24, 1877, at the Church of the Holy Spirit in Gambier, Ohio and priest on May 15, 1878, in St Paul's Church, Cleveland, Ohio, both by the Bishop of Ohio, Gregory T. Bedell. He first served as assistant of All Saints' Church in Cleveland, Ohio from 1877 till 1880, before becoming rector of St Mark's Church in Cleveland in 1881. In 1884, he became rector of St John's Church in Richmond, Virginia and in 1893, he left for Louisville, Kentucky to serve as rector of St Andrew's Church.

== Episcopacy ==
After the creation of the Diocese of Lexington in 1895, Burton was elected as its first bishop. He was consecrated on January 30, 1896, by Bishop Thomas Underwood Dudley of Kentucky, in St Andrew's Church, Louisville, Kentucky. He retained the post till his resignation on October 16, 1928. He died at his home in Lexington, Kentucky on October 18, 1940, after a long illness.
