= Stacy F. Sauls =

American Episcopal bishop (born 1955)

The Right Reverend Stacy Fred Sauls CStJ
- Bishop of Lexington
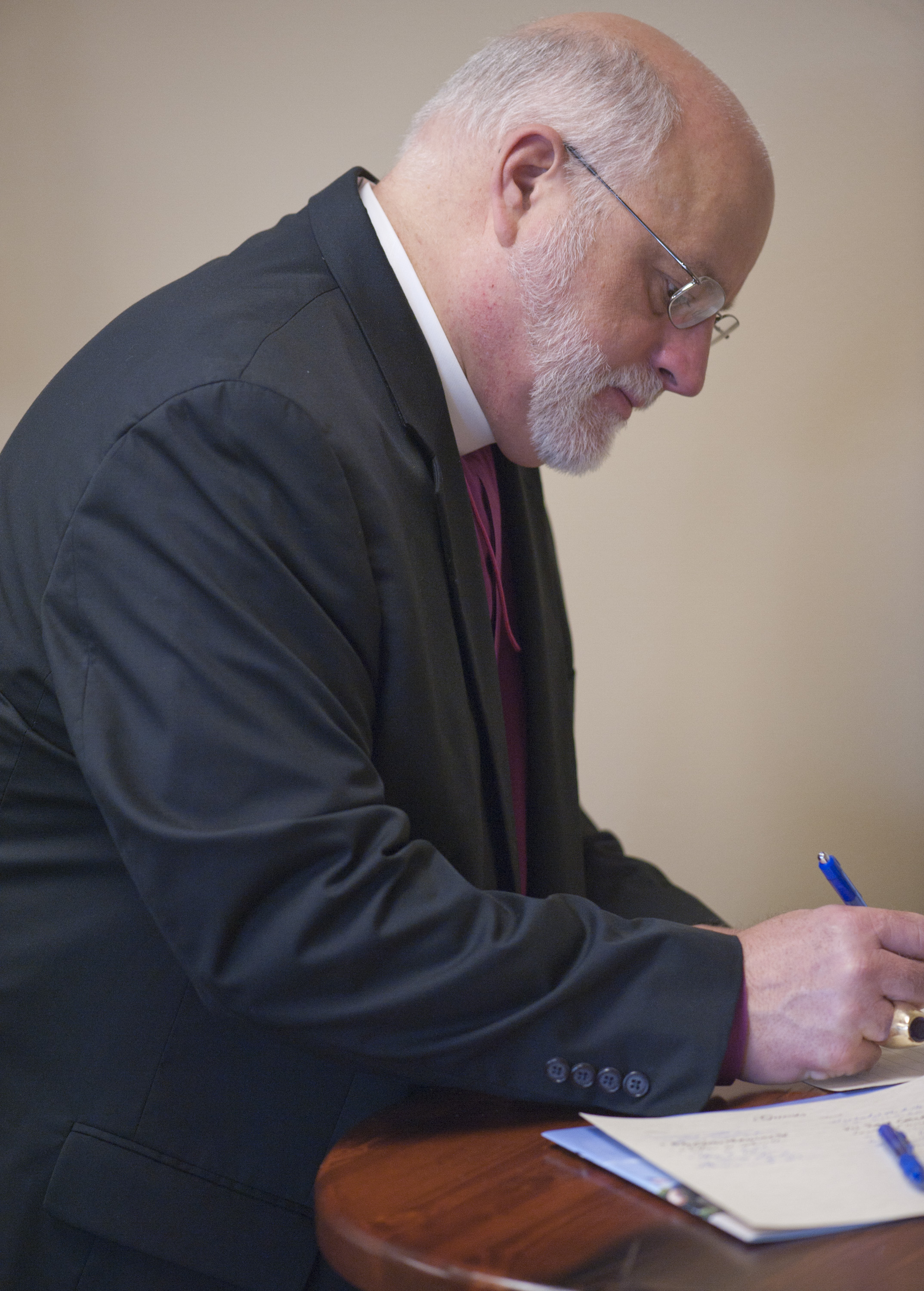
- Sauls in 2012
- Church: Episcopal Church
- Diocese: Lexington
- Elected: June 3, 2000
- In office: 2000–2011
- Predecessor: Don Wimberly
- Successor: Douglas Hahn
- Other post: Chief Operating Officer of the Episcopal Church (2011–2016)

Orders
- Ordination: June 11, 1988 (deacon) · April 6, 1989 (priest) by Frank Allan
- Consecration: September 30, 2000 by Robert Hodges Johnson

Personal details
- Born: Stacy Fred Sauls; December 9, 1955 (age 70) Atlanta, Georgia, US
- Denomination: Anglican
- Spouse: Ginger Malone (m. 1979)
- Education: Furman University; University of Virginia; General Theological Seminary

Stacy Fred Sauls CStJ (born December 9, 1955) was the sixth Bishop of Lexington, serving from 2000 to 2011. He then served as chief operating officer of the Episcopal Church from September 1, 2011, to 2016.

== Early life and education ==
Sauls was born on December 9, 1955, in Atlanta, Georgia, the son of Kenneth Sauls and Joyce Ballard. He was raised in the United Methodist Church. He was educated at Headland High School and graduated in 1973. He then attended Furman University and graduated with a Bachelor of Arts in political science in 1977. On August 11, 1979, he married Ginger Malone and together had two sons. He also studied at the University of Virginia School of Law, and graduated in 1980. He then became a member of the Order of the Coif. After graduation, he accepted a federal court clerkship and practiced in the corporate law department of Delta Air Lines. In 1985, he entered the General Theological Seminary and earned his Master of Divinity in 1988.

== Ordained ministry ==
Sauls was ordained deacon on June 11, 1988, at St. Philip's Cathedral in Atlanta, Georgia, and priest on April 6, 1989, at St. George's Church in Griffin, Georgia, on both occasions by Bishop Frank Allan of Atlanta. He served as assistant at St. George's Church, before becoming rector of St. Thomas' Church in Savannah, Georgia, in 1990. After four year, in 1994, he became rector of St. Bartholomew's Church in Atlanta, Georgia.

== Bishop ==
On June 3, 2000, Sauls was elected on the second ballot as Bishop of Lexington, during the 104th diocesan convention. He was consecrated on September 30, 2000, in the Roman Catholic Cathedral of Christ the King, Lexington, Kentucky, due to its large capacity. He was consecrated by the Bishop of Western North Carolina, Robert Hodges Johnson.

In 2011, Sauls resigned his post in Lexington and became Chief Operating Officer for the Episcopal Church. He was placed on administrative leave during a financial misconduct investigation that took place in December 2015. In April 2016, he was exonerated of the allegations; however, he was forced to resign his post.

== Honors ==
Sauls was appointed Officer to the Order of St John in 2013 and promoted Commander in 2017.
