= David Sibley =

David Sibley may refer to:

- David Sibley (actor) (born 1948), British actor, active from 1976 to present
- David Sibley (music supervisor), American music supervisor, active from 1989 to present
- David Sibley (politician) (born 1948), Texas State Senator, 1991–2002
- David Allen Sibley (born 1961), American ornithologist
- David C. Sibley (born 1985), American bishop-elect, Episcopal Diocese of Lexington
