= St Bartholomew's Cathedral, Messumba =

Church in Mozambique

Coordinates: 12°36′36″S 34°46′42″E

St Bartholomew's Cathedral, Messumba, is an Anglican church in the Diocese of Niassa, Mozambique. It has a partnership with St Peter's Church, Hammersmith.
