= KFBU (Laramie, Wyoming) =

Radio station in Laramie, Wyoming (1922–1929)

KFBU was an AM radio station, located in Laramie, Wyoming. First licensed on October 3, 1922, it was the first broadcasting station authorized in the state. Its call sign was changed to KWYO in January 1929, and it was deleted the following September.

== History ==
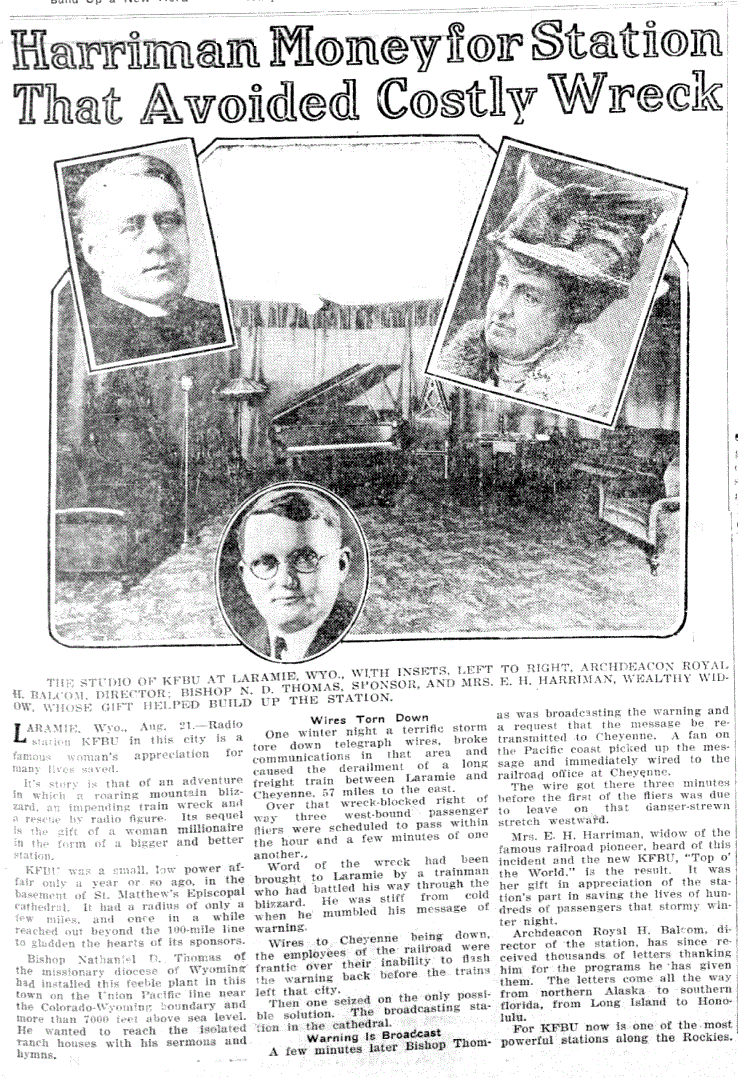
1926 station article.

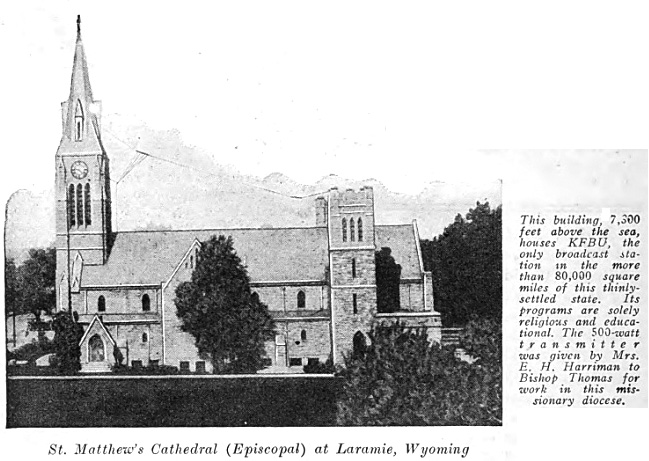
1928 photograph of Saint Matthew's cathedral, including the KFBU transmitting antenna.

=== KFBU ===
The Department of Commerce regulated radio stations in the United States from 1912 until the 1927 formation of the Federal Radio Commission. Originally there were no restrictions on which radio stations could make broadcasts intended for the general public. However, effective December 1, 1921, a regulation was adopted limiting broadcasting to stations operating under a Limited Commercial license that authorized operation on designated wavelengths of 360 meters (833 kHz) for "entertainment", and 485 meters (619 kHz) for "market and weather reports".

The station was first licensed, as KFBU, on October 3, 1922, to "The Cathedral (Bishop Thomas)" in Laramie, for operation on the 360 meter "entertainment" wavelength. The call sign was randomly issued from an alphabetical list of available call letters. Because there was only the single wavelength of 360 meters for entertainment broadcasts, KFBU had to establish a time-sharing arrangement with any other local stations.

KFBU was the first broadcasting station licensed in the state of Wyoming, which was the last of the then-48 U.S. states to have a broadcasting station. It was located at Saint Matthew's Cathedral, and its establishment was due to the efforts of Bishop Nathaniel Seymour Thomas, the region's missionary bishop for the Episcopal church. Bishop Thomas had given a sermon over KDKA, the Westinghouse station in East Pittsburgh, Pennsylvania, and viewed radio as a potential significant aid in reaching the widely scattered regional population.

Initial station construction was done by Warner N. Crosby, a University of Wyoming engineering student, with experimental transmissions begun in October. On November 5, there was a railroad accident during a blizzard on a nearby pass. A railroad employee made it to Laramie, intending to notify Cheyenne by telegraph that the rail line was blocked. It turned out that the storm had also downed the telegraph lines, so KFBU was used instead, with Crosby contacting a Kansas City amateur station, 9ANQ, and arranging for its operator to send a warning telegram to Cheyenne. A few days later, Crosby ended his work at the still uncompleted station, so Earl R. Witzel, another university student, assumed engineering duties. The first church service broadcast was made on February 17, 1924.

With a power of only about 50 watts, KFBU's coverage fell far short of the range needed to be heard throughout the state. In 1925, after recounting the station's 1922 contribution to railway safety, Bishop Thomas convinced Mrs. Edward Harriman, widow of Union Pacific's former president, to donate the $12,000 needed to upgrade the station to 500 watts, although this was still not enough to reliably cover the entire state. Elden F. Horn was given primary responsibility for installing the station upgrade. However, on October 29, Horn was electrocuted while working at the station. After Horn's death, E. C. Page and George Walker completed the installation, which went into service on December 10, and the debut broadcast was heard "from Chicago to Winnipeg, from Vancouver to San Diego, and from El Paso to St. Louis". Religious services and programs were scheduled for Sundays from 7:30 to 8:30 p.m. and Wednesdays from 9 to 11 p.m. Mondays and Fridays from 9 to 11 p.m. were reserved for secular programs, and Saturday was used for testing from midnight to 1 a.m. Effective November 11, 1928, as part of a major reallocation implemented by the Federal Radio Commission's General Order 40, KFBU was assigned to 600 kHz.

Annual operating costs were estimated at $2,500 to $5,000, and were partly shared by the University of Wyoming, which utilized the station for its own broadcasts. Eventually the expenses proved to be too much, and the station was sold to the university. In retrospect, in one reviewer's opinion "It was a worthwhile—even noble—concept which fell short in execution."

=== KWYO ===
In early 1929 KFBU was transferred to the University of Wyoming, and the call letters changed to KWYO. It was announced that the station would be rebuilt on the university campus, and become a "state-owned and state service station", providing programming that "will largely be educational in nature". Wyoming Public Radio traces its origin to this station. However, the effort was short-lived, and due to lack of funds KWYO was deleted on September 24, 1929.
