= Christopher Mackenzie-Beevor =

British courtier

Colonel Christopher David Mackenzie-Beevor CBE LVO
- Born: 10 April 1949 (age 77)
- Military career
- Rank: Lieutenant

Colonel Christopher David Mackenzie-Beevor CBE LVO (born 10 April 1949) is a British courtier who was Lieutenant of Honourable Corps of Gentlemen at Arms from 2018 to 2019 and Clerk of the Cheque and Adjutant from 2016 to 2017.

He was educated at King's College, Taunton and the Royal Military Academy Sandhurst. He was Commanding Officer of the 1st The Queen's Dragoon Guards from 1990 to 1992.

He was made an Officer of the Order of the British Empire (OBE) in the 1989 New Year Honours, a Commander of the British Empire (CBE) in the 1996 New Year Honours, and a Lieutenant of the Royal Victorian Order (LVO) in the 2020 New Year Honours.

His stepfather was Humphry Beevor.
