= Douglas Hahn =

American prelate

The Right Reverend Douglas Hahn
- Bishop of Lexington
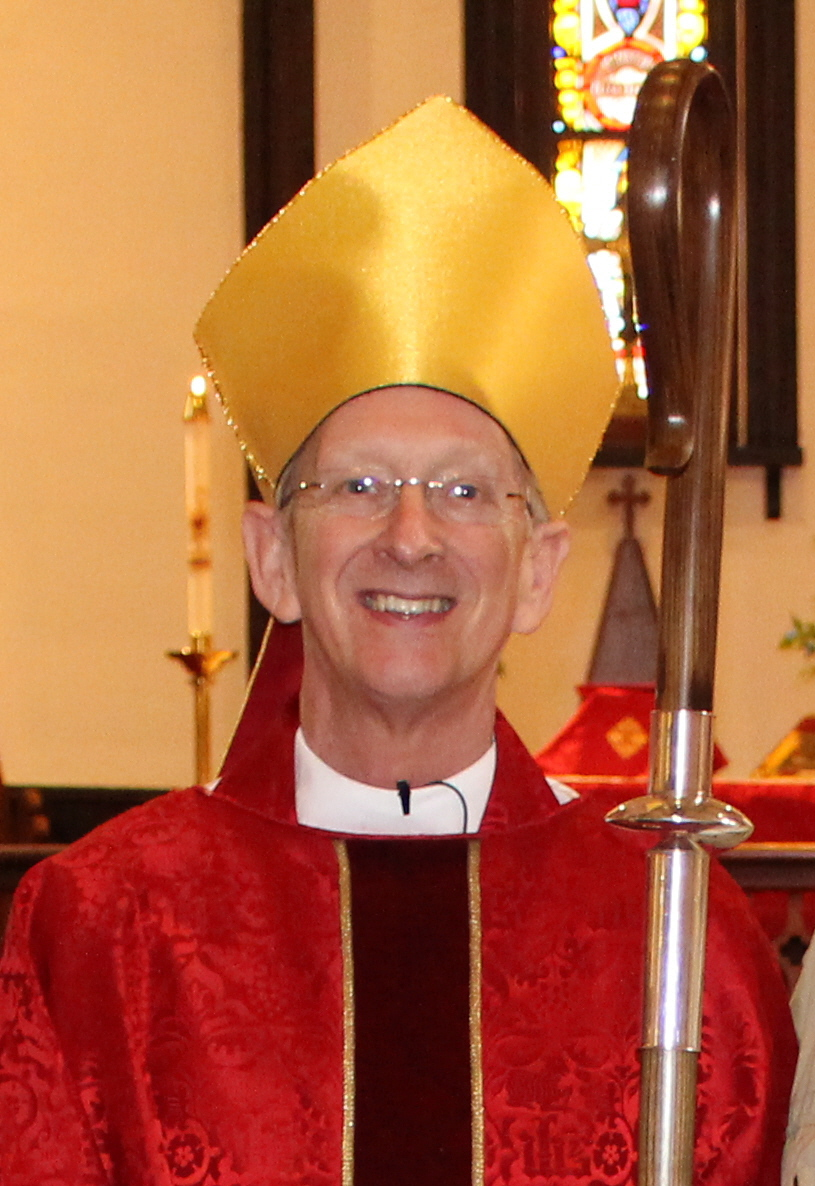
- Church: Episcopal Church
- Diocese: Lexington
- Elected: August 18, 2012
- In office: 2012–2016
- Predecessor: Stacy F. Sauls
- Successor: Mark Van Koevering

Orders
- Ordination: 1996
- Consecration: December 15, 2012 by Katharine Jefferts Schori

Personal details
- Denomination: Anglican (prev. Baptist)
- Spouse: Kaye Hahn
- Children: 3
- Education: University of Georgia, Southern Baptist Theological Seminary, General Theological Seminary, University of the South

Douglas Hahn is an American prelate who served as the seventh Episcopal Bishop of Lexington. He was elected on August 18, 2012, and consecrated on December 15, 2012, in Lexington, Kentucky. He served until March 9, 2016, when he was suspended for one year for lying during the bishop interview process about past adultery with a parishioner. In October of that year, the Standing Committee of the diocese asked that Hahn resign as head of the diocese. In December, Hahn agreed to resign as of the end of his suspension, on March 10, 2017.

== Biography ==
Hahn was raised in Georgia but his ancestors include generations of Kentucky teachers and farmers. As a youth, Bishop Hahn often spent summers in rural Mercer County, Kentucky. He is married to Kaye with whom he has three adult children.

== Accession ==
Hahn was elected bishop on August 18, 2012, at the diocese's 116th annual convention held at Christ Church Cathedral in Lexington, Kentucky. He was elected on the second ballot out of a field of six nominees. On that ballot he received 67 votes of 120 cast in the lay order and 26 of 44 cast in the clergy order. An election on that ballot required 61 in the lay order, and 23 in the clergy order.

He was consecrated on December 15, 2012, at Christ Church Cathedral, Lexington, Kentucky. Chief consecrator was Katharine Jefferts Schori, Presiding Bishop. The co-consecrators were: J. Neil Alexander, dean of the School of Theology at the University of the South; Terry White, Bishop of Kentucky; Stacy F. Sauls, Chief Operating Officer of the Episcopal Church and former sixth Bishop of Lexington; Chilton R. Knudsen, retired Bishop of Maine and interim assisting Bishop of Lexington; and William O. Gafkjen, Bishop of the Indiana-Kentucky Synod of the Evangelical Lutheran Church in America.

Testimonials at the episcopal ordination were presented by Ann Davis McClain, treasurer and interim secretary of the Episcopal Diocese of Lexington; Buck Hinkle, Chancellor of the Diocese of Lexington; Mary Kilborn-Huey, chair of the Commission on Ministry of the Diocese of Lexington; Jan M. Cottrell, president of the Standing Committee of the Episcopal Diocese of Lexington; and George D. Young, Bishop of East Tennessee, representing the bishops of the church.

== Education ==
- Doctor of Ministry (D.Min.), Pastoral Leadership, University of the South, 2010 "Infusion: Youth Engaging Issues of Faith and Society"
- Sabbatical Grant for Pastoral Leaders, The Louisville Institute, 2007, "Refreshing the Roots of Ministry"
- Pastoral Care Specialist Certificate, Congregational Care and Development, 2004–05
- The Pastoral Institute, Leadership Columbus, 2001–02
- Diploma in Anglican Studies, General Theological Seminary, 1996
- M.Div., Southern Baptist Theological Seminary, 1977
- BA, History, University of Georgia, 1974

== Prior positions ==
- 1999–2012: Rector, St. Thomas, Columbus, GA, Convocational Dean 2003–2012
- 1993–1999: Associate, St. George's Episcopal, Griffin, GA
- 1990–1993: Buckhead Christian Community Ministry, Atlanta, GA (an outreach affiliate of the Episcopal Cathedral of Saint Philip)
- 1991–1993: Rainbow House, Outreach of Christ Church Episcopal, Norcross, GA
- 1987–1990: Atlanta Baptist Association, Home Mission Board
- 1980–1986: Assistant, Morningside Baptist, Atlanta, GA
- 1978–1979: Chaplain, New Orleans Baptist Hospital, New Orleans, LA
