= Carlos Matsinhe =

Mozambican Anglican bishop (born 1954)

The Right Reverend Carlos Matsinhe
- Church: Anglican Church of Mozambique and Angola (IAMA)
- Diocese: Lebombo
- In office: 2014–2024
- Predecessor: Dinis Sengulane
- Other posts: Acting Presiding Bishop, IAMA (2021–2024)
- Previous post: Dean of Maciene Cathedral

Orders
- Ordination: 6 January 1980
- Consecration: 20 September 2014 by Thabo Makgoba

Personal details
- Born: 2 October 1954 (age 71) Homoine, Mozambique

Carlos Simão Matsinhe (born October 2, 1954) is a Mozambican Anglican bishop. He was the 11th Anglican bishop—and the second Mozambican-born bishop—of the Lebombo, Mozambique. Matsinhe is also chairman of Mozambique's National Electoral Commission.

== Early life and education ==
Matsinhe was born in Homoine, Mozambique. He was educated in a nearby Roman Catholic missionary school and subsequently went to Our Lady of the Immaculate Conception College in the city of Inhambane. Supported by former Bishop Daniel Pina Cabral, from 1975 to 1979, Matsinhe studied theology and trained for priesthood at St. Mark Anglican Seminary in Dar-es-Salaam, which was affiliated to Makerere University one of Africa's oldest higher learning institutions.

== Ministry ==
Matsinhe was made deacon in 1979 while simultaneously working as a translator and time and standards technician at Mabor General, a state owned tyre manufacturing company. On January 6, 1980, he was ordained priest and then became rector to the parish of SS. Stephen and Lawrence, and later dean of St. Augustine's Cathedral, from 1998 to 2014. During his tenure he also acted as a chaplain to the Anglican youth (1981–1987), chaplain to The Mission to Seafarers, a role he remembers with great joy. “That was one of my doors to the world. When a ship arrived I had to be there to welcome the seamen, show them the Post Office...because at that time boats spent long periods docked in the port.” While at St. Stephen and St. Lawrence, Matsinhe and congregation members developed a Street Children Rehabilitation Centre which sought to provide shelter, education and re-integration of street children in society. The centre also trained children in soap-making, sewing, batik, visual arts and lasted nearly 25 years. In the 35 years of work for the diocese, Matsinhe also coordinated a theological exchange program with Brazil, England, Sweden, and the U.S., and represented the Anglican Church of Southern Africa in the 7th General Assembly of the World Council of Churches in Canberra, Australia.

== Education career ==
Matsinhe played a major role in education and is widely regarded has one of the pioneers in the development of the private education sector in post-Marxist Mozambique, to help curb the shortage of college places in the public system. In collaboration with the DanChurchAid, Matsinhe fundraised and coordinated the construction of The Anglican School of St. Cyprian in Maputo. This facility accommodated about 1,500 students a year and catalyzed the creation of a network of private colleges in Maputo. Matsinhe was also central in the creation of the Paulo Mabumo Arts Centre, an arts and craft centre training artisans in embroidery, weaving, dying and making of recycled paper using leaves, bark, roots, petals, and recyclables. Recently he also worked with ALMA London, in the reconstruction of the Maciene primary and secondary school. Since his appointment to Bishop of Lebombo, Matsinhe has turned his focus to the development and construction of a theology school, set to also serve candidates to priesthood from Angola.

== Land Law ==
Former president of the Mozambican Association of Mutual Aid (ORAM), Matsinhe also contributed in the revision and extension of the Land law. Acting as an interlocutor between peasants and the state, promoted accessibility of land and dissemination of information on Land rights and Protection mechanisms. Advocating a non-privatization of the land, ORAM is now proposing a revision of the mining law to ensure transparency and ethics in the exploitation of the vast natural gas reserves resources that the country now sits on.

== Bishop of Lebombo ==
Matsinhe emerged as a candidate to be the next bishop of Lebombo in March 2014, when the Rt. Revd. Dinis Sengulane announced his retirement after leading the church for 38 years. His election as the Bishop of Lebombo took place on August 10, 2014 at St. Augustine's Cathedral after a voting process led by Thabo Makgoba, the Archbishop of Cape Town. Matsinhe was consecrated Bishop of Lebombo on September 28, 2014, at Pavilhão do Maxaquene. Following the formation of the Anglican Church of Mozambique and Angola (IAMA) in 2021, Matsinhe served as acting presiding bishop.

In 2021, Matsinhe was appointed to a six-year term as chairman of Mozambique's National Electoral Commission (CNE). In the wake of the 2023 Mozambican local elections, in which courts found voting irregularities in favor of the ruling FRELIMO party, human rights activist Adriano Nuvunga criticized Matsinhe for legitimizing the election results. Ten of the 12 other IAMA bishops called on Matsinhe to retire in a public December 2023 letter. Nearing the mandatory retirement age of 70, Matsinhe retired as bishop of Lebombo and acting primate in July 2024. He remained on as chairman of the CNE, presiding over the 2024 Mozambican general election.

== Personal life ==
Matsinhe is married to Hortência Samuel and together they have five children, Simão, Melita, Samito, Graça and Artur.

Anglican Communion titles
| Preceded by Dinis Sengulane | Bishop of Lebombo; 2014 – 2024 | Succeeded by Vacant |
