= Almon Abbott =

Canadian prelate

The Right Reverend Henry Pryor Almon Abbott D.D., LL.D.
- Bishop of Lexington
- Almon Abbott
- Church: Episcopal Church
- Diocese: Lexington
- Elected: January 30, 1929
- In office: 1929–1945
- Predecessor: Lewis W. Burton
- Successor: William R. Moody

Orders
- Ordination: 1905 by Clarendon Worrell
- Consecration: May 15, 1929 by John Gardner Murray

Personal details
- Born: July 11, 1881 Halifax, Nova Scotia, Canada
- Died: April 4, 1945 (aged 63) Lexington, Kentucky, United States
- Denomination: Anglican
- Parents: John Abbott & Ella Almon
- Spouse: Rachel Caroline Gwyn
- Children: 5
- Education: University of King's College

Henry Pryor Almon Abbott (July 11, 1881 – April 4, 1945) was a prelate of the Episcopal Church, who served as Bishop of Lexington from 1929 to 1945.

== Early life and education ==
Abbott was born July 11, 1881, in Halifax, Nova Scotia, the son of the Reverend John Abbott and Ella Almon. He was educated at Rothesay Collegiate School in Rothesay, New Brunswick. He attended the University of King's College, Windsor, Nova Scotia from where he graduated with a Bachelor of Arts in 1902 and a Master of Arts in 1904. He was awarded a Doctor of Divinity in 1911 by the same university. He also studied at St Stephen's House, Oxford. On July 11, 1907, he married Rachel Caroline Gwyn, and together had five children. He was also awarded another Doctor of Divinity, this time from the University of the South in 1929. The University of Kentucky awarded him an honorary Doctor of Laws in 1942.

== Ordained ministry ==
He was ordained deacon in 1904 by Bishop Tully Kingdon of Fredericton, and priest in 1905 by Bishop Clarendon Worrell of Nova Scotia. He was Curate at St Luke's Cathedral in Halifax, NS from 1904 to 1906, and briefly served as assistant rector of the Church of St James the Apostle in Montreal in 1906. That same year, he became rector of Christ Church Cathedral in Hamilton, Ontario, where he remained till 1914. Subsequently, from 1910 till 1911, he served as Dean of Niagara After arriving in the United States, Abbott became Dean of Trinity Cathedral, Cleveland, Ohio in 1914, while in 1919, he became rector of Grace and St Peter's Church in Baltimore. Between 1928 and 1929, he was rector of St Chrysostom's Church in Chicago.

== Episcopacy ==
On January 30, 1929, Abbott was elected Bishop of Lexington and was consecrated on May 15, 1929, with Presiding Bishop John Gardner Murray as chief consecrator. He retained the post until his death in 1945. His episcopate is noted for his work in freeing the diocese from debt during the Depression years and worked to promote missionary work in the mountain regions of the diocese. He died on April 4, 1945, of a heart attack.

== Books ==
- Help from the Hills: Senior Confirmation Instructions (1917)
- The Man Outside the Church, and Other Sermons (1917)
- Sparks from a Parson’s Anvil, 1918.
- The Supreme Sacrifice: Seven Words from the Cross (1918)
- The Religion of the Tommy: War Essays and Addresses, 1918.
- Foundation Stones, 1925.
- The Joy of the Cross, 1925.
- Things that Matter, 1941.
- What is Christianity?
