= Stanley Pickard =

Stanley Chapman Pickard, OBE (4 July 1910 – 31 March 1988) was the eighth Bishop of Lebombo from 1958 until 1969.

He was ordained in 1938 and his first post was as a curate at St Catherine's, New Cross. He became a UMCA missionary, rising in time to be Archdeacon of Portuguese East Africa. In 1958 he was elevated to the episcopate, serving for a decade. After this he was Rector of St John's, Belgravia before retirement in 1983.

== Notes ==
Anglican Church of Southern Africa titles
Preceded by Humphry Beevor	Bishop of Lemombo; 1958–1968	Succeeded by Daniel Pina Cabral
