= Paul G. Chandler (author) =

American author, interfaith peacemaker, art curator, and Anglican clergyman

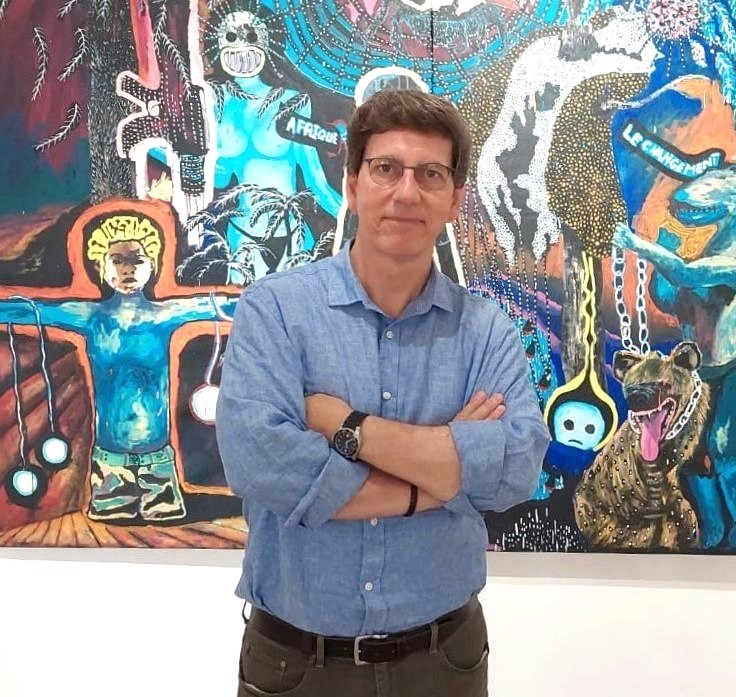
- Chandler at Galerie Mémoires Africaines in Senegal in June 2024
- Born: 1964 (age 61–62)
- Occupations: Author, interfaith peacemaker, art curator, Anglican clergyman
- Notable work: In Search of a Prophet: A Spiritual Journey with Kahlil Gibran
- Spouse: Lynne Chandler
- Children: 2

Paul Gordon Chandler (born 1964) is the Founding President of CARAVAN Arts. He is an author, art curator, interfaith peacemaker, social entrepreneur, and Anglican clergyman. From 2021 to 2024, he was the US Episcopal Bishop of Wyoming. He has worked on various projects concerning the Middle East and Africa, ecumenical publishing, relief and development agencies, the arts and the Anglican Communion. He wrote In Search of a Prophet: A Spiritual Journey with Kahlil Gibran on the Lebanese writer and artist Kahlil Gibran. In 2020, he was awarded by the Archbishop of Canterbury the Hubert Walter Award for Reconciliation and Interfaith Cooperation.

== Life ==
Chandler grew up in Senegal. He studied at Wheaton College, where he majored in theological studies (B.A. 1986), and also at Chichester Theological College (a Church of England institution) in England. He was the director of international programs with IBS Publishing. He then worked as rector of St. George's Episcopal Church in Tunis/Carthage, the only English-speaking church in Tunisia, and was Chaplain to the British Embassy. He then was U.S. CEO of IBS Publishing. Later, he was president/CEO of Partners International.

Between 2003–2013, he was the Rector of St. John's Church (Maadi) in Cairo, Egypt and Director of the East-West Center for Peace. While in Cairo, he founded CARAVAN Arts, an international non-profit/NGO that is focused on using the arts to build bridges between cultures and spiritual traditions. He also served as Rector of the Church of the Epiphany and chairman of the Anglican Centre in Doha, Qatar.

In 2020, he was awarded by the Archbishop of Canterbury the Hubert Walter Award for Reconciliation and Interfaith Cooperation, the highest international award for outstanding service in the work of reconciliation and interfaith dialogue within the Anglican Communion. From 2021 to 2024 he was the bishop of the Episcopal Diocese of Wyoming in the USA. His service as bishop ended in March 2024, when he voluntarily accepted a sentence of deposition from ordained ministry in the US Episcopal Church after an investigation into "an alleged indiscretion with a member of [the] diocesan team." In a statement to Episcopal News Service, Chandler said he does not admit to the "specific allegations and charges brought against [him]". He is an ordained Anglican priest in the Episcopal/Anglican Province of Alexandria, and a Canon of All Saints’ Cathedral in Cairo, Egypt.

== Books ==
Chandler's book on Kahlil Gibran, the best-selling Lebanese born poet-artist and author of The Prophet, is In Search of a Prophet: A Spiritual Journey with Kahlil Gibran (Rowman & Littlefield). He is also the author of a book on Muslim-Christian relations titled Pilgrims of Christ on the Muslim Road: Exploring a New Path Between Two Faiths (Rowman & Littlefield) that focuses on the life and thought of Mazhar Mallouhi, the Syrian Arab novelist and “Sufi Muslim follower of Christ”. His first book was God’s Global Mosaic, What We Can Learn from Christians Around the World (InterVarsity Press/IVP, 2000). Chandler is also the author of Songs In Waiting: Spiritual Reflections on Christ's Birth...A Celebration of Middle Eastern Canticles (Morehouse Publishing, 2009).
