= David Sibley (music supervisor) =

David Sibley is a music supervisor, working in Los Angeles, California, on various film and TV productions, including Desperate Housewives and Dark Justice.

He received an Emmy nomination for his work on the NBC TV miniseries The Little Richard Story. Prior to that he was the head of music for Ronald Perelman's New World Entertainment run by Brandon Tartikoff, which produced numerous television shows including Marvel Comics' Spider-man animated series as well as productions by Stephen J. Cannell.
