= St. Thomas Episcopal Church (Beattyville, Kentucky) =

Historic church in Kentucky, United States

- U.S. National Register of Historic Places
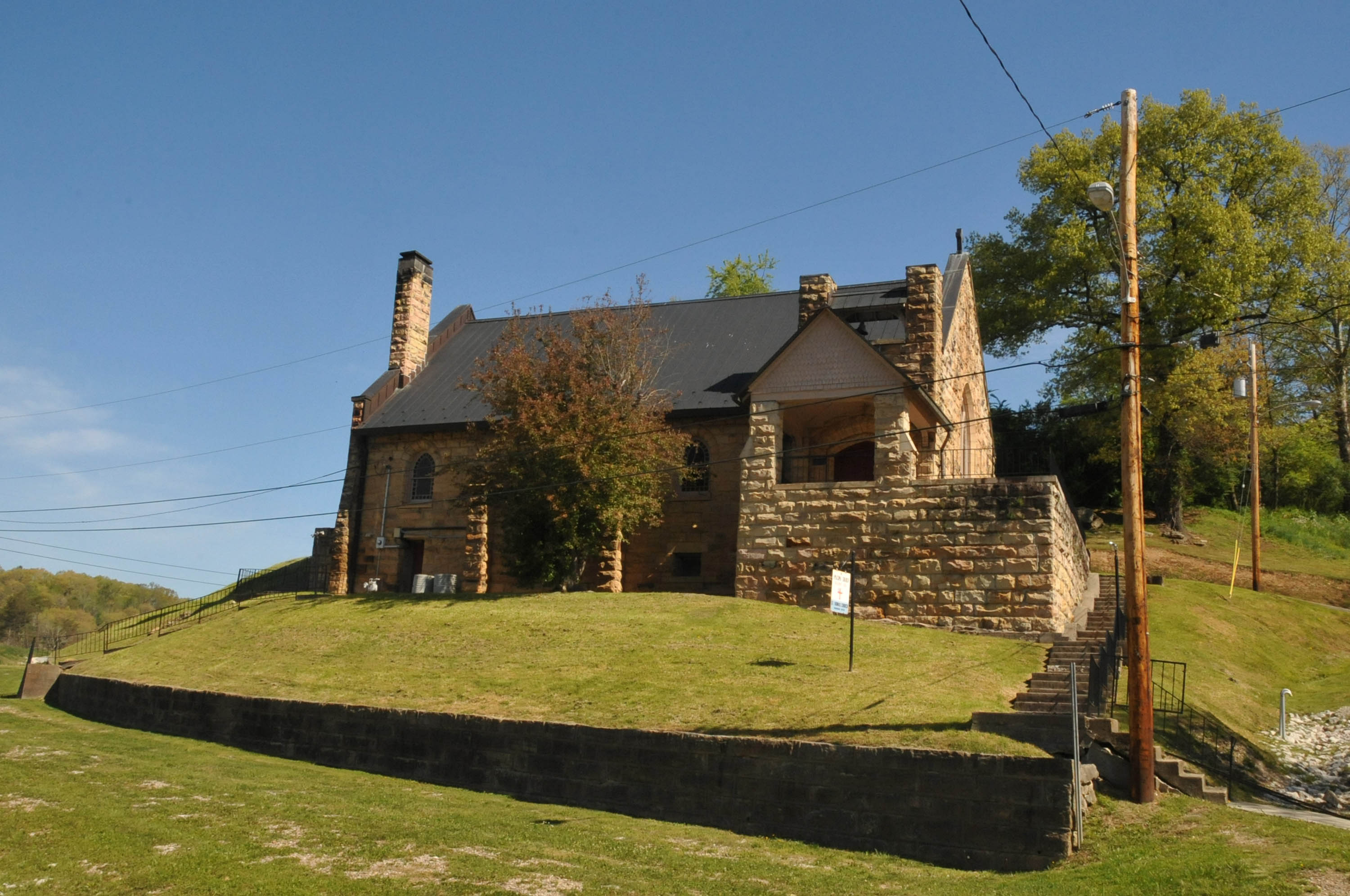

- Location within Kentucky Location within the United States
- Location: Hill St., Beattyville, Kentucky, United States
- Coordinates: 37°34′30″N 83°42′35″W
- Area: 2 acres (0.81 ha)
- Built: 1903; 123 years ago
- NRHP reference No.: 76000911
- Added to NRHP: April 21, 1976

St. Thomas Episcopal Church is a historic Episcopal parish and church on Hill Street in Beattyville, Kentucky, United States. The stone church building was added to the National Register of Historic Places in 1976.

Efforts to establish an Episcopal Church presence in the area began in the mid-19th century, after Benjamin B. Smith, Bishop of Kentucky, visited the area in 1840 while serving as Kentucky's Superintendent of Public Instruction. In 1845, he raised $200 from St. Paul's in Boston, and St. Paul's mission was established in Proctor, across the Kentucky River, in 1870. The mission in turn established a chapel in Beattyville in 1879. Smith's successor, Thomas Dudley, purchased land in 1887 to construct a church, but the cornerstone was not laid until 1896. Construction was thereafter led by local carpenter and stonemason Richard Nathaniel Lyons Sr. Dudley consecrated the new church of St. Thomas, Beattyvile, on November 15, 1903.
