= Mark Van Koevering =

American prelate of the Episcopal Church

The Right Reverend Mark Van Koevering
- Bishop of Lexington
- Church: Episcopal Church
- Diocese: Lexington
- Elected: November 1, 2019
- In office: 2019–present
- Predecessor: Douglas Hahn
- Previous posts: Bishop of Niassa (2003-2015); Assistant Bishop of West Virginia (2015-2018); Provisional Bishop of Lexington (2018-2019)

Orders
- Consecration: September 14, 2003 by Njongonkulu Ndungane

Personal details
- Born: Michigan, United States
- Denomination: Anglican (prev. Reformed Church)
- Spouse: Helen Van Koevering
- Children: 3

Mark Van Koevering is an American prelate of the Episcopal Church, who is the eighth and current Bishop of Lexington.

== Biography ==
Van Koevering was consecrated as Bishop of Niassa, Mozambique, part of the Anglican Church of Southern Africa, in 2003, where he served until November 2015.

Van Koevering was raised in the Christian Reformed Church. He studied agriculture and plant breeding at university, working in Thailand, China and then as an agriculturist with DanChurchAid in Niassa, Mozambique. There he met and married Helen, who was working with the Christian Council of Mozambique, reuniting war orphans with their families. He was the diocesan director of development when he felt called to the ministry. He trained Trinity College, Bristol and was ordained in Wales, working under Rowan Williams, the then archbishop in Newport when the people of Niassa elected him as their bishop. His wife Helen was ordained shortly before leaving Wales in 2003.

Until April 2011 the Van Koeverings' ministry in Niassa was supported through USPG. In April 2011 The Van Koevering Trust Fund was set up to secure funds for the furthering of the Van Koeverings' ministry in Niassa.

In November 2015, he moved back to the United States, to become the assistant bishop at the Episcopal Diocese of West Virginia. In February 2018, he became the Bishop Provisional of the Episcopal Diocese of Lexington On November 1, 2019, Bishop Van Koevering was elected the eighth diocesan bishop of the Episcopal Diocese of Lexington. On October 7, 2024, Bishop Van Koevering announced his retirement as eighth diocesan bishop of the Episcopal Diocese of Lexington, and called for the election of his successor. The election of the ninth Diocesan Bishop of Lexington is scheduled for May 30, 2026.

== See also ==
- List of Episcopal bishops of the United States
- Historical list of the Episcopal bishops of the United States

== Notes and references ==
- John D. Battersby (25 July 1987). "American Tells of Mozambique Raid". New York Times.
- Morgan, Alison (2011). The Word on the Wind: Renewing Confidence in the Gospel. Monarch Books. p. 111. ISBN 978-0-85721-015-9.
- Africa News. Africa News Service. 1987.
- Europa World Year. Taylor & Francis. 2004. ISBN 978-1-85743-255-8.
- Bellah Zulu (16 April 2013). "Mozambique bishop calls for peace". Anglican News. Anglican Communion Office.
- +Thabo Cape Town (31 August 2013). "Ad Laos - To the People of God, August 2013 - and July 2013". archbishop.anglicanchurchsa.org.
- +Karla Ward (24 February 2018). "Episcopal Diocese of Lexington affirms Bishop Provisional". Lexington Herald-Leader.
- Vincent Dippenaar (December 2008). "God in Distant Land" (PDF). Anglican News. Vol. 18, no. 6. Pietermaritzburg: Anglican Diocese of Natal.

Anglican Church of Southern Africa titles
Preceded by Paulino Manhique	Bishop of Niassa; 2003 - 2015	Succeeded by Vicente Msosa
