= Callaville, Virginia =

Unincorporated community in Virginia, United States

Coordinates: 36°49′43″N 77°40′03″W

Callaville is an unincorporated community located in Brunswick County, in the U.S. state of Virginia.
