= Diocese of Niassa =

- Archdeaconries: 6

Statistics
- Parishes: 32
- Congregations: 426
- Members: 65,500

Information
- Denomination: Anglican Church of Mozambique and Angola
- Cathedral: St. Bartholomew, Messumba

Current leadership
- Bishop: Lucas Mchema

Website
- Diocese of Niassa

The Diocese of Niassa (pt. Diocese Anglicana do Niassa) it is one of the eight Anglican dioceses of Mozambique, part of the Anglican Church of Mozambique and Angola. (Note: This diocese was formerly part of the Anglican Church of Southern Africa) This diocese is geographically in the northwestern corner of the country, the others being the Diocese of Lebombo, Diocese of Nampula, the Missionary Diocese of Zambezia, the Missionary Diocese of Tete, the Missionary Diocese of Inhambane, the Missionary Diocese of Rio Pungue, and the Missionary Diocese of Maciene.

== History ==
Mark van Koevering, an American of Dutch descent, was the diocesan bishop from 2003 to 2015. The diocese itself was not able to elect a bishop after three days of election to succeed him and so it was delegated to the synod of bishops of the Anglican Church of Southern Africa in September 2016 where the Synod elected Vicente Msosa as the bishop elect, being consecrated bishop of the Diocese of Niassa on 25 February 2017.

== Structure ==
Niassa diocese is divided into six archdeaconries: Cobue, Lunho, Lichinga, Milange, Rio Chire and Lurio.

The diocese has 426 congregations, over 65,500 worshipers, and 55 priests. It has a link with the Diocese of London in the Church of England.

== List of bishops ==
- Paulo Zuizane Litumbe 1979-1985
- Paulino Manhique 1985-2003
- Mark van Koevering 2003-2015
- Vicente Msosa 2017-2021
- Lucas Mchema 2022-present

On 5 December 2021, Vincente Msosa was transferred from Niassa to Zambezia; on 6 May 2022, Lucas Mchema was elected to become bishop of the diocese. Mchema was consecrated bishop on 9 July 2022 at Messumba.

== Coat of arms ==
The diocese registered a coat of arms at the Bureau of Heraldry in 2001 : Per fess wavy Or and Azure, in chief a dug-out issuant Brunatre, seated therein a fisherman proper, vested about the loins Argent and holding pendant from a handline Sable a fish Argent, in base three barrulets wavy of the last; the shield ensigned of a mitre proper.

== Anglican realignment ==
Under Bishop Vicente Msosa leadership, the Diocese of Niassa has been supportive of the Anglican realignment. He was one of the two bishops of the Anglican Church of Southern Africa to attend GAFCON III, in Jerusalem, on 17-22 June 2018.
