= Episcopal Diocese of Wyoming =

Diocese of the Episcopal Church in the United States

Coordinates: 41°18′44″N 105°35′34″W

Diocese of Wyoming

Location
- Country: United States
- Territory: Wyoming
- Ecclesiastical province: Province VI

Statistics
- Congregations: 45 (2025)
- Members: 5,201 (2025)

Information
- Denomination: Episcopal Church
- Established: January 30, 1968
- Cathedral: St Matthew's Cathedral

Current leadership
- Assistant Bishop: Todd Ousley (provisional)

Map
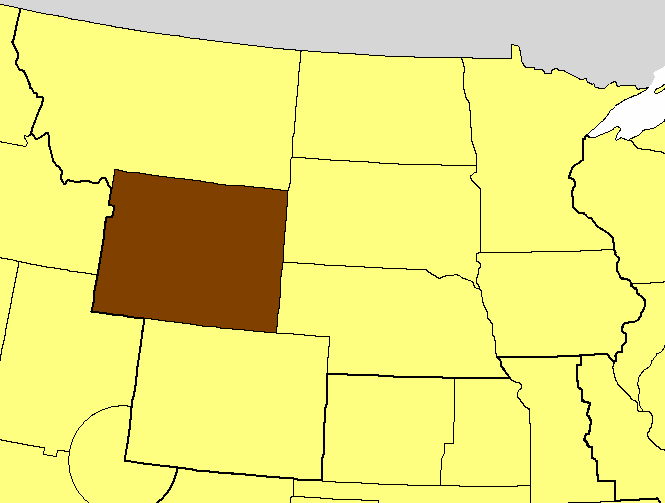
- Location of the Diocese of Wyoming

Website
- www.episcopalwy.org

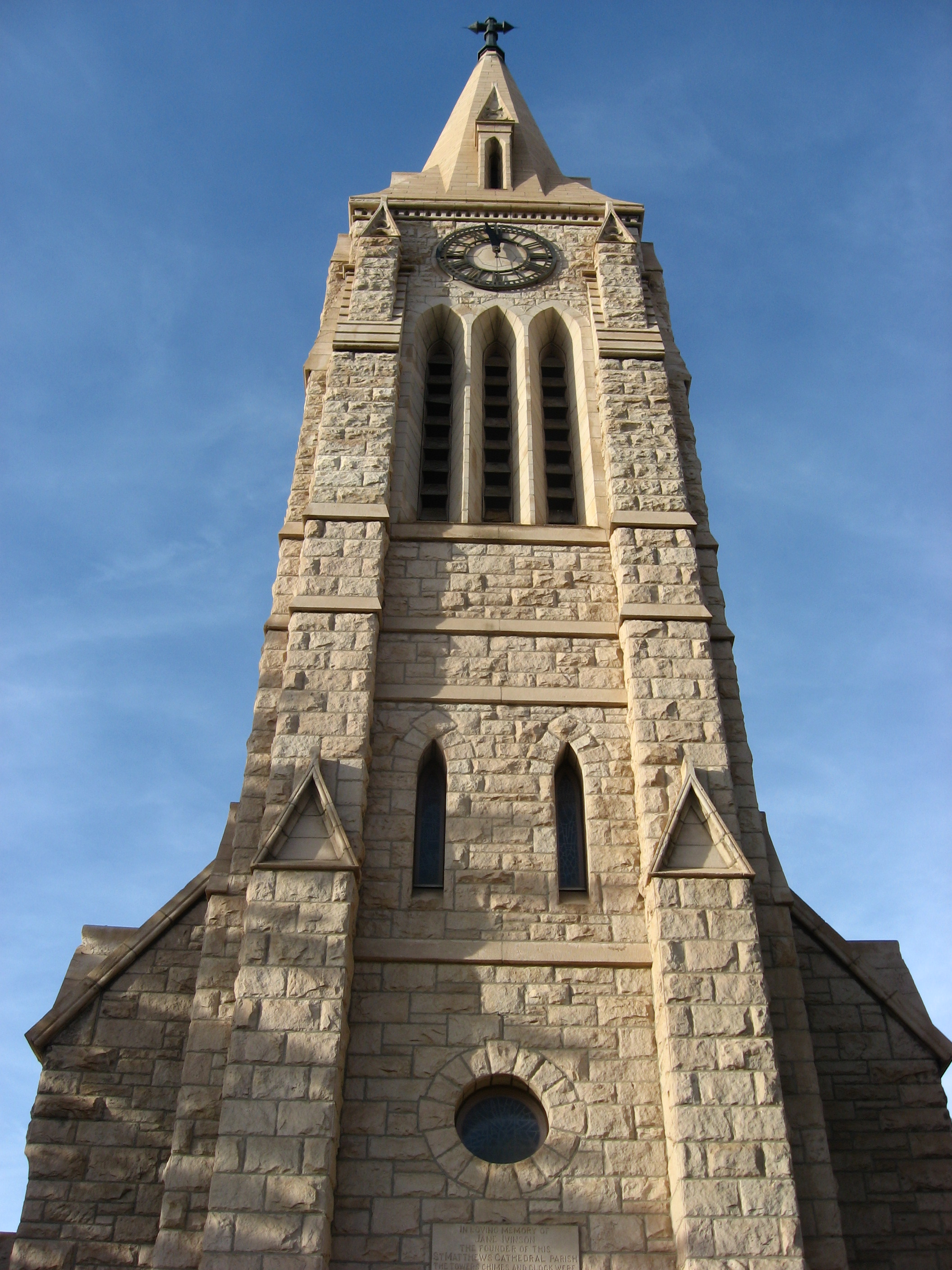
St. Matthew's Cathedral in Laramie

The Episcopal Diocese of Wyoming is the diocese of the Episcopal Church in the United States of America with jurisdiction over the state of Wyoming, except for one congregation in western Wyoming which is included in the Episcopal Diocese of Idaho. It was established in 1887 and is in Province VI. Its cathedral, St Matthew's Episcopal Cathedral is in Laramie while the diocesan offices are in Casper.

The diocese reported 6,935 members in 2016 and 5,201 members in 2025. Plate and pledge income for the 45 filing congregations of the diocese in 2025 was $4,243,172. Average Sunday attendance (ASA) was 1,382 persons. This is a relative decline from ASA of 1,694 in 2016.

Paul-Gordon Chandler was the 10th bishop of Wyoming. His consecration was held on February 13, 2021, in Laramie, Wyoming, and he served until voluntarily accepting a sentence of deposition from ordained ministry in March 2024. He succeeded John Sheridan Smylie.

Following Chandler's departure, former Presiding Bishop Katharine Jefferts Schori began serving the diocese as a part-time assisting bishop in July 2024 during its leadership transition. In March 2025, a special diocesan convention affirmed Todd Ousley as bishop provisional.

== Missionary Bishops ==
The Missionary District of Idaho and Wyoming was created by the General Convention of October 1886. The first missionary bishop, whom the Diocese of Wyoming counts as its first diocesan bishop, was Ethelbert Talbot, a pioneering bishop who went on to become Bishop of the Episcopal Diocese of Central Pennsylvania (subsequently the Diocese of Bethlehem) and Presiding Bishop from 1924-1926.

From 1898-1909 the Episcopal Church in Wyoming was overseen by bishops with other responsibilities. Following Talbot's resignation in 1898, the General Convention, meeting in October that year, added Wyoming to the district overseen by Anson Rogers Graves, who had been elected First Missionary Bishop of Nebraska in 1889. Graves oversaw the diocese concurrently with his work in Nebraska until October 1907. Thereafter James B. Funsten, first Bishop of the Missionary District of Boise in Idaho since 1899, and first Bishop of the Episcopal Diocese of Idaho from 1907-1918 had oversight of the Diocese until the consecration and installation of Nathaniel Thomas in October 1909. Thomas is counted as the second diocesan.

== Bishops of Wyoming ==
	Honorific & Name	Dates
1st	Ethelbert P.E. Talbot	1887–1898
2nd	Nathaniel S. Thomas	1909–1927
3rd	Elmer N. Schmuck	1929–1936
4th	Winfred Hamlin Ziegler	1936–1949
5th	James Wilson Hunter	1949–1969
6th	David Thornberry	1969–1977
7th	Bob Gordon Jones	1977–1996
8th	Bruce Edward Caldwell	1997–2010
9th	John Sheridan Smylie	2010–2021
10th	Paul-Gordon Chandler	2021–2024
Provisional bishop	Todd Ousley	2025–2026

== See also ==
- Succession of Bishops of The Episcopal Church (U.S.)
