= Anglican Church of Mozambique and Angola =

Ecclesiastical province of the world-wide Anglican Communion

- Igreja Anglicana de Moçambique e Angola
- Abbreviation: IAMA
- Classification: Protestant
- Orientation: Anglican
- Polity: Episcopal
- Presiding Bishop: Vicente Msosa
- Associations: Anglican Communion
- Region: Angola and Mozambique
- Language: Portuguese
- Liturgy: Book of Common Prayer
- Origin: 24 September 2021
- Branched from: Anglican Church of Southern Africa
- Members: 730,000

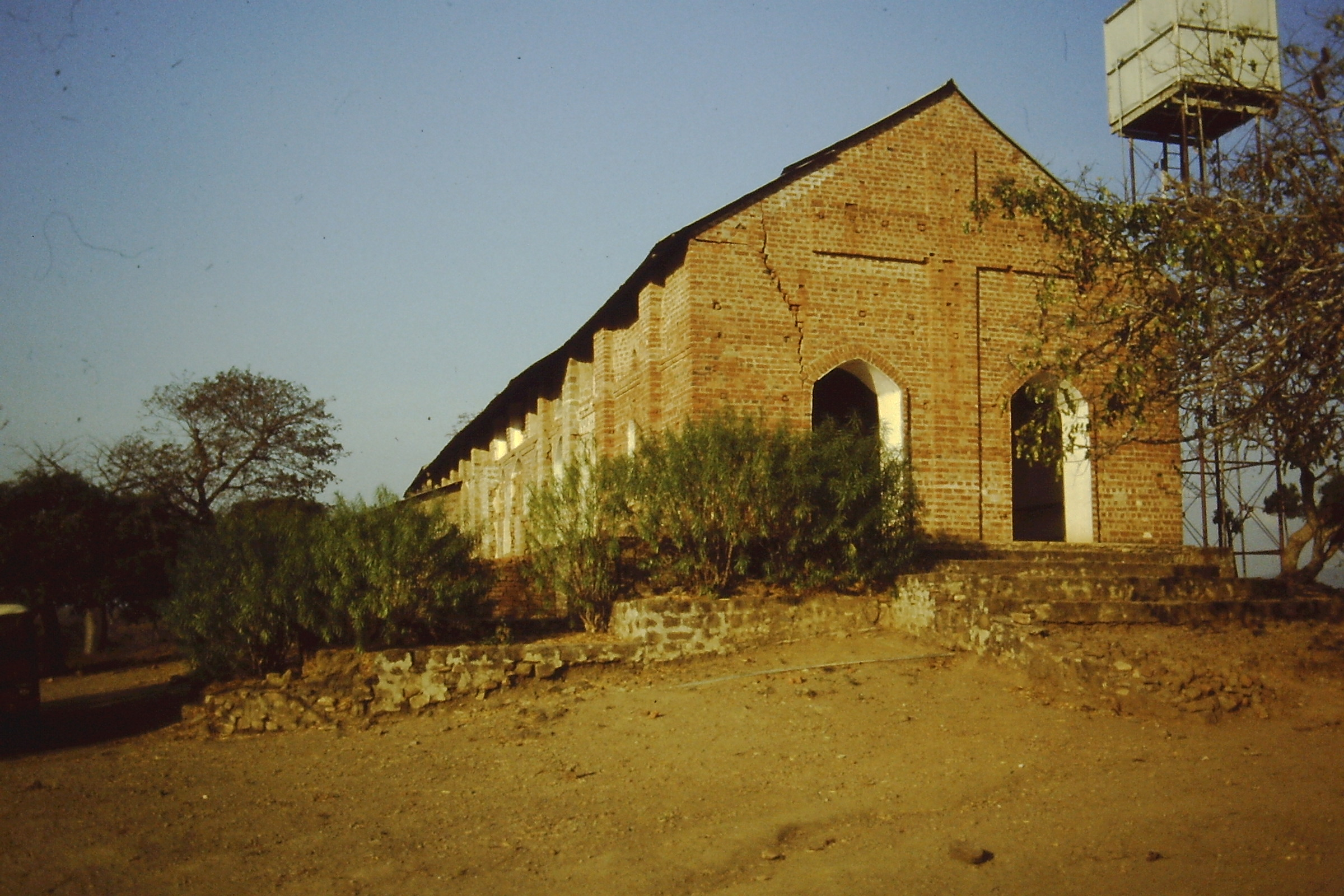
Messoumba Anglican mission

The Anglican Church of Mozambique and Angola (Portuguese: Igreja Anglicana de Moçambique e Angola, IAMA) is the 42nd ecclesiastical province of the world-wide Anglican Communion. Established in 2021, is the newest province to have been erected. Previously the dioceses which constitute this new province were parts of the Anglican Church of Southern Africa. The new province adopted its constitution and canons at a special synod, and was formally inaugurated on 24 September 2021, in an online teleconference including Justin Welby, Archbishop of Canterbury, and Josiah Idowu-Fearon, Secretary-General of the Anglican Consultative Council.

According to the US National Statistics Institute, in 2020, an estimated 2 percent of the population of Mozambique, or 615,600 people, are Anglican. According to the Diocese of Angola, there were 115,000 Anglicans in Angola in 2019. In 2023, the province elected Filomena Tete Estevão as its first female bishop.

== Presiding bishops ==
At the province's inauguration, Carlos Matsinhe became acting presiding bishop and André Soares the acting dean of the province. In 2024, Bishop Vicente Msosa of Zambezia was elected the first presiding bishop of the province.

== Dioceses in Mozambique ==
=== Diocese of Lebombo ===
The oldest diocese in the province, Lebombo diocese dates to 1893. It was part of the Anglican Church of Southern Africa until 2021. The mother church is St Augustine's Cathedral, Maciene. It has two archdeaconries: Maputo, and Umbeluzi.

=== Diocese of Niassa ===
In 1979, the Diocese of Lebombo was split to create the Diocese of Niassa; the cathedral is St Bartholomew's Cathedral, Messumba. It has six archdeaconries: Cobue, Cuamba, Mecanhelas, Lichinga, Lunho, and Marrupa.

=== Diocese of Nampula ===
The missionary diocese of Nampula, Mozambique, was erected from the Diocese of Niassa and inaugurated on 16 August 2019. It has two archdeaconries: Nampula, and Cabo Delgado. Manuel Ernesto has been the missionary bishop since its inauguration, having previous been area bishop over the same area, in Niassa diocese.

=== Missionary Diocese of Pungue River ===
The Missionary Diocese of Púnguè River is one of two new dioceses erected during 2021 in anticipation of the new province; it was split from Lebombo diocese and inaugurated on 11 July. It has one archdeaconry: Púnguè. On 30 April 2022, Paulo Hamsine was elected to become the first bishop of the diocese. He was consecrated bishop on 19 June 2022 at Maputo and enthroned on 16 October 2022.

=== Missionary Diocese of Maciene ===
Erected from Lebombo diocese, it has five archdeaconries: St Saviour, Nhamavila, Limpopo, Macia, and Chibuto. On 19 April 2022, Agostinho Buque was elected to become the first bishop of the missionary diocese. He was consecrated bishop on 19 June 2022 at Maputo and enthroned on 28 August 2022.

=== Missionary Diocese of Inhambane ===
Erected from Lebombo diocese, it has three archdeaconries: Chambone, Central Inhambane, and Buquene. On 23 April 2022, Emmanuel Capeta was elected to become the first bishop of the missionary diocese. He was consecrated bishop on 19 June 2022 at Maputo and enthroned on 2 October 2022.

=== Missionary Diocese of Tete ===
Created from parts of Niassa and Lemombo, it has one archdeaconry: Tete. On 7 May 2022, Sergio Bambo was elected to become the first bishop of the missionary diocese. He was consecrated bishop on 19 June 2022 at Maputo and collated in Tete on 23 October 2022.

=== Missionary Diocese of Zambesia ===
Erected from the Diocese of Niassa, it has two archdeaconries: Milange, and Rio Chire. On 5 December 2021, Vicente Msosa was translated from Niassa to become the first bishop of the missionary diocese.

== Dioceses in Angola ==
=== Diocese of the Good Shepherd ===
The Diocese of Angola was created in 2003 from that of Lebombo; until 2021, its territory was all of Angola. The current bishop is André Soares. At some point during or after the diocesan reorganisations, this diocese became the Diocese of the Good Shepherd (Bom Pastor). It consists of three archdeaconries: Luanda North, Cabinda, and Dande.

=== Diocese of Christ the King ===
The Diocese of Christ the King (Cristo Rei, in Uíge) is the second of two new dioceses erected during 2021 in anticipation of the new province; it was split from the Diocese of Angola and inaugurated on 18 July. It consists of four archdeaconries: Uige, Lukunga Loge, Nzadi a Lukizi, and Mbemba Ngango. On 19 April 2022, Augusto Domingos was elected to become the first bishop of the diocese. He was consecrated bishop on 26 June 2022 at Luanda and enthroned on 10 July 2022.

=== Missionary Diocese of Central and South Angola ===
Inaugurated 8 August 2021. It consists of two archdeaconries: Central Angola, and South Angola. On 7 May 2022, Pedro Vilar Jamba was elected to become the first bishop of the missionary diocese. He was consecrated bishop on 26 June 2022 at Luanda and enthroned on 17 July 2022.

=== Missionary Diocese of Divine Hope ===
Portuguese: Divina Esperança, based in Luanda South, and inaugurated 25 July 2021. It consists of two archdeaconries: Luanda South, and Kwanza. On 28 May 2022, Joaquim Bondo was elected to become the first bishop of the missionary diocese. He was consecrated bishop on 26 June 2022 at Luanda and enthroned on 24 July 2022.
