= Diocese of Lebombo =

Location
- Ecclesiastical province: Mozambique and Angola
- Archdeaconries: 6

Statistics
- Parishes: 40

Information
- Rite: Anglican
- Cathedral: Cathedral of St. Augustine, Maciene

Current leadership
- Bishop: Vacant

Website
- Anglican Diocese of Lebombo at the ACSA Official Website

The Diocese of Lebombo (pt. Diocese Anglicana dos Libombos) is a diocese in the Anglican Church of Mozambique and Angola. (Note: This diocese was formerly part of the Anglican Church of Southern Africa) It is one of the three Anglican dioceses of Mozambique. This diocese is the most southerly of the three, the others being the Diocese of Niassa and the Diocese of Nampula.

== History ==
The diocese was a result of the British missionary activity in Portuguese Mozambique, in the 19th century. The first bishop nominated of the Anglican Diocese of Lebombo was William Edmund Smyth, in 1893, who would be in functions until 1912. Only after the beginning of the war of independence between Portugal and the FRELIMO, the diocese would have his first Portuguese language bishop, Daniel Pina Cabral, a white European born prelate. Pina Cabral developed friendly relationships with the Roman Catholic bishops of Mozambique and established contact with members of the FRELIMO. He would be in office from 1969 to 1976, shortly after the independence. He was succeeded by the first Mozambican-born black bishop, Dinis Sengulane, in office from 1976 to 2014. He was succeeded by Carlos Matsinhe.

== Structure ==
The seat of the diocesan bishop is the Cathedral of St Augustine in Maciene in Mozambique. The largest city in the diocese is Maputo.

The diocese is divided into 6 archdeaconries: Inhambane District, Limpopo, Maciene, Maputo District, Pungoe and Umbeluzi.

There are advanced plans for the division of the diocese into three separate dioceses. At the 2012 Provincial Synod of the Church of Southern Africa these plans were first discussed in detail, and as an interim measure two new episcopal areas were to be created in Lebombo Diocese, with two Area Bishops appointed to work with the Diocesan Bishop. The 21st session of the diocesan synod, meeting in October 2015, confirmed these plans, and also stated that the new dioceses would be named Inhambane and Pungue.

== List of Bishops ==
- William Edmund Smyth 1893–1912
- John Latimer Fuller 1913–1920
- Leonard Noel Fisher 1921–1928
- Basil William Peacey 1929–1936
- Dennis Victor 1936–1948
- John Boys 1948–1952
- Humphry Beevor 1952–1958
- Stanley Chapman Pickard 1958–1969
- Daniel Pina Cabral 1969–1976
- Dinis Sengulane 1976–2014
- Carlos Matsinhe 2014–2024

== Sources ==
- Sheldon, Kathleen; Newitt, Malyn (1997). "A History of Mozambique". African Studies Review. 40 (1): 179. doi:10.2307/525052. ISSN 0002-0206. JSTOR 525052. S2CID 147300558.
- Burrell, Sheenagh (23 February 2012). "ALMA - Reps Circular". Alma Link. Diocese of London. "At the Provincial Synod of Bishops the multiplication of Mozambican dioceses was on the agenda. Archbishop Thabo reports: We began our work with a lively discussion facilitated by Bishop Brian Germond around the topic of creatively thinking outside of the box. We re-examined some of the mission opportunities God provides us, and the recent proposals of multiplication coming from the dioceses of Mozambique challenged us to think again on how we might respond"
- MANNA Magazine, no. 90, Mozambique and Angola Anglican Association, p. 10, Spring 2012
- "Bishop Dinis Sengulane". Global Health Council. Archived from the original on 19 October 2010.
- Malton, W. H. C. (1912). The Story of the Diocese of Lebombo. Lebombo Home Association.
