= Christ Church Cathedral (Lexington, Kentucky) =

- Location in Kentucky
- 38°02′55″N 84°29′48″W
- Location: 166 Market St. Lexington, Kentucky
- Country: United States
- Denomination: Episcopal Church in the United States of America
- Website: www.ccclex.org

History
- Founded: 1796

Architecture
- Style: Gothic Revival
- Completed: 1848

Administration
- Diocese: Episcopal Diocese of Lexington

Clergy
- Bishop(s): Mark Van Koevering, Bishop Provisional of Lexington
- Dean: Carol Wade

Christ Church Cathedral is the seat of the Episcopal Diocese of Lexington and is located at 166 Market Street, Lexington, Kentucky, United States. Founded in 1796, Christ Church Cathedral is the oldest Episcopal church in the Commonwealth of Kentucky. Renovations over the years have sought to preserve the original structure, and it remains relatively unchanged. The church created what is now called the Old Episcopal Burying Ground, located nearby. It held many who died during the cholera epidemics of 1833 and 1848, but most of the remains have been moved due to flooding.

Working with the Martin Luther King Neighborhood Association and Seedleaf, the cathedral has established a community garden. It is operated primarily to grow vegetables for nearby residents, and encourages their participation in all steps: growing, harvesting, preparing and preserving. Hundreds of pounds of vegetables are given away annually to residents and community associations. In 2009 the garden was enlarged to include fruit trees and berry bushes.

In recent outreach, Christ Church Cathedral has supported recognition of London Ferrill, the second preacher of First African Baptist Church. He led his church for 31 years, by 1850 building a congregation of 1,820 members, the largest of any in the state. He was one of the few clergy to stay in the city during the 1833 cholera epidemic, when 500 died of a total of 7,000 people in the city, including nearly one-third of the congregation of Christ Church. At death in 1854, Ferrill was buried in the Old Episcopal Burying Ground, the only African American to be so honored. In 2010, Christ Church supported installation of a monument to Ferrill at the burying ground, celebrating with a joint service with First African Baptist. They also supported approval of a state highway marker for the site. In addition, Christ Church named its community garden in honor of London Ferrill.

The Bishop Provisional of the Episcopal Diocese of Lexington is currently Mark Van Koevering.

== History of Christ Church 1796–1989 ==
The present building, the fourth to occupy the site, was erected in 1848 and enlarged to its present state during the American Civil War. James Moore became the first rector of Christ Church in 1796. He began to hold services in a small frame building on the present site of Christ Church. He was also the first President of Transylvania University In 1803, a proper church building was constructed of brick replacing the quickly outgrown house. In 1814, a larger brick building, stuccoed to represent stone, replaced the smaller building.

Christ Church became a cathedral in 1897 and remained so until 1944, when William Moody moved the cathedral to St. George Chapel at the Cathedral Domain, a large camp in rural southeastern Kentucky. In 1989, the former bishop, Don A. Wimberly, moved the Cathedral back to Christ Church, re-establishing it as the cathedral of the diocese, where it remains so today.

In 1976, Christ Church was listed on the National Register of Historic Places. It qualified for inclusion both because of its architecture and because of its significance in the area's history.

== List of deans ==
Seal of the cathedral

- 1997–2010: Morris K. Thompson Jr.
- 2011–present: Carol Wade

== Music ==
=== Choirs ===
Christ Church Cathedral has supported and sustained choirs trained in the English Cathedral tradition for over 50 years. Unique in its depth and breadth, instruction for the boys, girls, and teens is based on the curriculum of the Royal School of Church Music. Children and youth deepen their sense of history, liturgy, language, and art as well as their ability to interpret sacred texts and music. Through the ongoing effort of learning and working together, they also develop friendships and become part of a community that uplifts collective and individual efforts. Christ Church Cathedral choristers learn what it is to be at the heart of worship. The choirs have sung in residence at many of England's cathedrals including York Minster, Exeter, Canterbury, St. Paul's, Westminster Abbey, and Lincoln. Additionally, the choir has recorded numerous times including the latest recording Sing We Merrily, released in November 2013. The Cathedral also supports a choir for women's and men's voices.

At some point, possibly in 1813 and thus before the construction of the third building on the site, the first performance in Kentucky of Handel's Messiah was held at Christ Church, with orchestra and soloists imported from Cincinnati, according to a 'History of Christ Church 1796–1848' retained in the cathedral archives.

=== Organ ===
1814 -unknown organ installed. 1848 - "uncommonly large" organ by Henry Erbern, New York.

19th-century Barkhoff organ

The present organ was built by Walter Holtkamp Sr. of Cleveland, Ohio. The organ is an example of the "American classic" ideal set forth during a 30-year period beginning in 1930 by G. Donald Harrison of Aeolian-Skinner, Boston, and Walter Holtkamp. The organ is designed to play the entire repertoire, lead congregational hymn singing, and accompany the unique sound of the Cathedral choirs.

The organ includes several different and colorful flute stops, generously scaled and clear-voiced principals, broad and bold reed tone, and warm strings. The pedal division includes five stops at sixteen-foot pitch.

In 1999, the Holtkamp Organ Company completely renovated the console, added solid state combination action, releathered the electro-pneumatic chests, and added a new Festival Trumpet. The Buzard Organ Company of Champaign, Illinois is the organ curator.

== List of organists, choirmasters and canon musicians ==
- 1815 fnu Wensell
- 1822 Abby Hammond
- 1832 fnu Candy – Choirmaster
- 1833 fnu White
- 1865 J.W Parsons
- 1866–1871 fnu Coleman – Choirmaster
- 1827–1883 Rudolf dseRoode
- 1883–1890 fnu Georgia
- 1890 E. Kidd
- 1890–1891 fnu Teichfusen
- 1891 E. H. Ward
- 1892–1893 Claude Kidd
- 1895–1904 Bertha Emery
- 1900–1903 A. C. Goodsight - Choirmaster
- 1903–1906 C. F Croyton – Choirmaster
- 1906–1911 Freed Lyman Wheeler – Choirmaster
- 1904–1942 Edith Love
- 1914–1915 Harlowe Dean - Choirmaster
- 1915–1916 Charles Louis Bennett – Choirmaster
- 1916 H. W. Towne – Choirmaster
- 1916–1918 Forrest Dabney Carr – Choirmaster
- 1920s Carl Lambert – Choirmaster
- 1930–1945 Thomas Harborne - Choirmaster
- 1941–1946 Anna Virginia Bryant
- 1946–1949 Boies Whitcoimb
- 1949–1961 Arnold Blackburn
- 1961–1967 Robert Quade (Founded current boys' choir, 1962)
- 1967–1978 Robert Burton
- 1978–1987 Robert Ludwig
- 1988–1992 Jeffrey Smith
- 1993–1996 Bruce E. Neswick
- 1996–2005 John E. Cummins
- 2005–present Erich Balling, Canon Musician

Assistant organists:

- 1990–2008 Schuyler Robinson
- 2009–2011 Shi-Ae Park
- 2012–present Lisa Hall

== See also ==
- List of the Episcopal cathedrals of the United States
- List of cathedrals in the United States
