= Daniel Pina Cabral =

Portuguese Anglican bishop (1924-2008)

The Right Reverend Daniel Pina Cabral
- Bishop of Lebombo
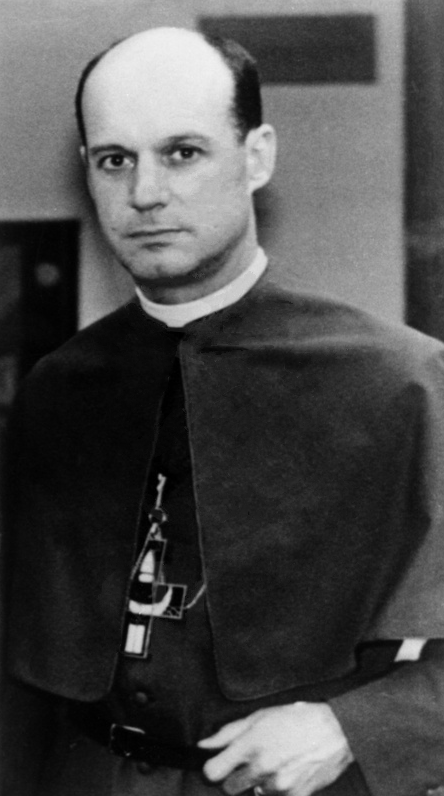
- Province: Anglican Church of Southern Africa
- Diocese: Lebombo
- In office: 1968–1976
- Predecessor: Stanley Pickard
- Successor: Dinis Sengulane

Orders
- Ordination: 1949
- Consecration: 1968

Personal details
- Born: 27 January 1924 Vila Nova de Gaia, Portugal
- Died: 23 June 2008 (aged 84) Porto, Portugal
- Denomination: Anglican
- Spouse: Anita

Daniel Pereira dos Santos de Pina Cabral (Vila Nova de Gaia, 27 January 1924 – Porto, 23 June 2008) was a Portuguese Anglican bishop. He was the ninth Bishop of Lebombo, Mozambique, from 1968 to 1976.
He was educated at the University of Lisbon and ordained in 1949.

== Notes ==
Anglican Church of Southern Africa titles
Preceded by Stanley Chapman Pickard	Bishop of Lebombo; 1968–1976	Succeeded by Dinis Salomão Sengulane
