= André Soares (bishop) =

Angolan Anglican bishop (born 1956)

The Right Reverend André Soares
- Bishop of Angola
- Church: Anglican Church of Southern Africa
- See: Diocese of Angola
- In office: 2003–present
- Predecessor: new title
- Previous post: Episcopal Delegate for Angola

Orders
- Ordination: 1984
- Consecration: 2003 by Njongonkulu Ndungane

Personal details
- Born: 7 May 1956 (age 70) Kinfinga, Songo, Portuguese Angola
- Denomination: Anglicanism

André Soares (born 7 May 1956) is an Angolan Anglican bishop. He has been the first Anglican Bishop of Angola since 2003. He is married to Janete João and they have eight children, six sons and two daughters.

== Ecclesiastical career ==
Soares was born in a village of Kinfinga, near Songo, and educated at the Pastoral Institute in Lukala, Zaire. He was ordained an Anglican priest in 1984 and began working in Uíge Province. In 1992 he became the Episcopal Delegate for Angola. In 2000 he was elected vice-president of the Angolan Council of Churches. In 2003, he was nominated and consecrated the first bishop of the newly created missionary Diocese of Angola. In 2019, he became the first diocesan bishop when the missionary diocese became an independent diocese.

He is a supporter of women's ordination and he believes that it is not an obstacle to ecumenism.

Anglican Church of Southern Africa titles
New title	Bishop of Angola; 2003 -	Incumbent
