= St. Matthew's Cathedral (Laramie, Wyoming) =

Historic church in Wyoming, United States

- St. Matthew's Cathedral Close
- U.S. National Register of Historic Places
- U.S. Historic district

- Location within Wyoming Location within the United States
- Location: 104 S. 4th St. Laramie, Wyoming
- Coordinates: 41°18′45″N 105°35′33″W
- Built: 1892-1896
- Architect: William Halsey Wood
- Architectural style: Gothic Revival
- NRHP reference No.: 84003622
- Added to NRHP: April 12, 1984

St. Matthew's Cathedral is an Episcopal cathedral located in Laramie, Wyoming, United States. It is the seat of the Diocese of Wyoming. The cathedral is a contributing property in the St. Matthew's Cathedral Close, a historic district listed on the National Register of Historic Places.

== History ==
St. Matthew's was established in 1868. The Rt. Rev. Ethelbert Talbot, the first bishop of the newly created Missionary District of Wyoming and Idaho chose Laramie as his See city. He then led the effort to build St. Matthew's Cathedral from 1892 to 1896. The cathedral cornerstone was laid on September 21, 1892, and it was dedicated on December 17, 1896. The church was consecrated on August 11, 1901. The 1967 General Convention of the Episcopal Church created the Diocese of Wyoming. The first diocesan convention was held at St. Matthew's on January 30, 1968. The Diocese of Wyoming is contiguous with the state of Wyoming. The cathedral is a part of the St. Matthew's Cathedral Close historic district placed on the National Register of Historic Places in 1984. The other elements in the district include the Deanery, Hunter Hall (formerly known as Sherwood Hall), and the First World War Memorial Cross.

== Architecture ==
New York City architect William Halsey Wood designed St. Matthew's Cathedral in the Gothic Revival style. The structure is built of native sandstone that was quarried nine miles northeast of Laramie. The church building is cruciform is shape with the bell tower and spire above the main entrance. The cross at the top of the spire is 118 feet (36 m) feet above the ground and 7,276 feet (2,218 m) feet above sea level, which makes St. Matthew's the highest cathedral in the United States. There are 11 bells in the tower that were cast by Meneely & Co., of Watervliet, New York. The clock on the tower was made by the E. Howard Clock Co. of Boston.

Several artists created the cathedrals stained-glass windows. They include Heaton, Butler and Bayne of London and New York City, Charles Connick of Boston, and Rowan and Irene LeCompte of New York and Washington, D.C.

== Organ ==
The pipe organ was installed by the E.M. Skinner Organ Co. in 1925, Opus 523. It features four manuals, 51 ranks, and 3,111 pipes. The console was replaced in 1998 by a 1928 Casavant console, from Opus 1275, rebuilt by Morel & Associates.

== Radio station KFBU ==
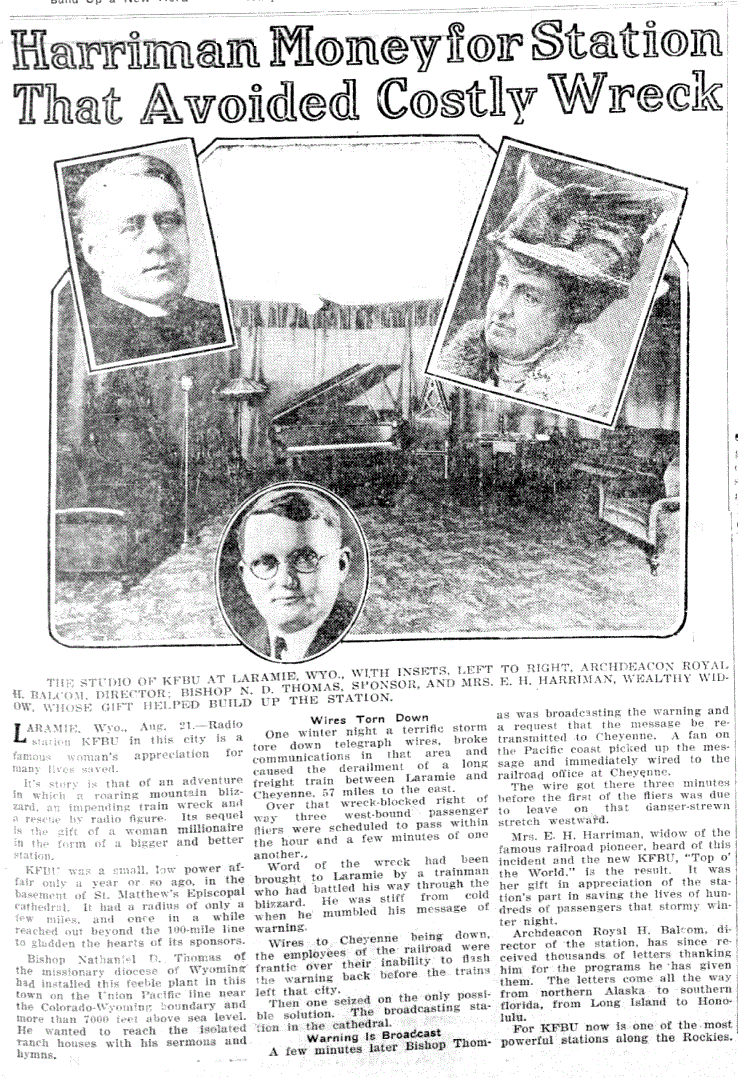
1926 station article.

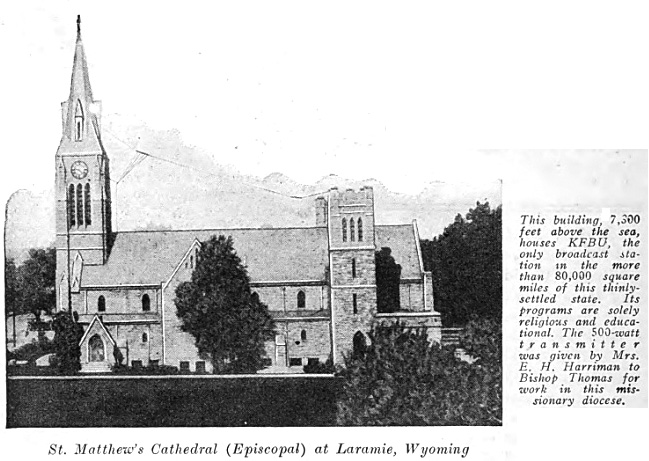
1928 photograph of Saint Matthew's cathedral, including the KFBU transmitting antenna.

On October 3, 1922, a broadcasting station license was issued to "The Cathedral (Bishop Thomas)". The station call sign, KFBU, was randomly issued from an alphabetical list of available call letters. This was the first broadcasting station in the state of Wyoming, which was the last of the then 48 U.S. states to establish a broadcasting station.

The station was established due to the efforts of Bishop Nathaniel Seymour Thomas, the region's missionary bishop for the Episcopal church. Bishop Thomas had given a sermon over KDKA, the Westinghouse station in East Pittsburgh, Pennsylvania, and viewed radio as a potential significant aid in reaching the widely scattered regional population. Initial station construction was done by Warner N. Crosby, a University of Wyoming engineering student. A transmitting antenna was strung atop the building, and experimental transmissions begun in October.

On November 5, a railroad accident occurred during a blizzard on a nearby pass. A railroad employee made it to Laramie, intending to notify the Cheyenne office by telegraph that the rail line was blocked. However, the storm had also downed the telegraph lines, so KFBU was used instead, with Crosby contacting a Kansas City amateur station, 9ANQ, and arranging for its operator to send a warning telegram to Cheyenne. A few days later, Crosby ended his work at the still uncompleted station, so Earl R. Witzel, another university student, assumed engineering duties. The first church service broadcast was made on February 17, 1924.

With a power of only about 50 watts, KFBU's initial coverage fell far short of the range needed to be heard throughout the state. In 1925, after recounting the station's 1922 contribution to railway safety, Bishop Thomas convinced Mrs. Edward Harriman, widow of Union Pacific's former president, to donate the $12,000 needed to upgrade the station to 500 watts, although this was still not enough to reliably cover the entire state. Elden F. Horn was given primary responsibility for installing the station upgrade. However, on October 29, Horn was electrocuted while working at the station. After Horn's death, E. C. Page and George Walker completed the installation, which went into service on December 10, and the debut broadcast was heard "from Chicago to Winnipeg, from Vancouver to San Diego, and from El Paso to St. Louis". Religious services and programs were scheduled for Sundays from 7:30 to 8:30 p.m. and Wednesdays from 9 to 11 p.m. Mondays and Fridays from 9 to 11 p.m. were reserved for secular programs, and Saturday was used for testing from midnight to 1 a.m. Effective November 11, 1928, as part of a major reallocation implemented by the Federal Radio Commission's General Order 40, KFBU was assigned to 600 kHz.

Annual operating costs were estimated at $2,500 to $5,000, and were partly shared by the University of Wyoming, which utilized the station for its own broadcasts. Eventually the expenses proved to be too much, and the station was sold to the university. In retrospect, in one reviewer's opinion "It was a worthwhile—even noble—concept which fell short in execution."

In early 1929 KFBU was transferred to the University of Wyoming, and the call letters changed to KWYO. However, due to lack of funds KWYO was deleted on September 24, 1929.

== See also ==
- List of the Episcopal cathedrals of the United States
- List of cathedrals in the United States
