= Philip McNairy =

American bishop

The Right Reverend Philip Frederick McNairy D.D.
- Bishop of Minnesota
- Church: Episcopal Church
- Diocese: Minnesota
- In office: 1971–1978
- Predecessor: Hamilton Hyde Kellogg
- Successor: Robert Marshall Anderson
- Previous posts: Suffragan Bishop of Minnesota (1958-1968); Coadjutor Bishop of Minnesota (1968-1970)

Orders
- Ordination: April 1935 by Henry Hobson
- Consecration: January 30, 1958 by Henry Knox Sherrill

Personal details
- Born: March 19, 1911 Lake City, Minnesota, United States
- Died: December 8, 1989 (aged 78) Minneapolis, Minnesota, United States
- Buried: St Mark's Cathedral
- Denomination: Anglican
- Parents: Harry Doughty McNairy & Clara Christina Moseman
- Spouse: Cary Elizabeth Fleming (m. 1935)
- Children: 3
- Education: Kenyon College

Philip Frederick McNairy (March 19, 1911 – December 8, 1989) was the sixth Diocesan Bishop of Minnesota in The Episcopal Church.

== Biography ==
Philip Frederick McNairy was born in 1911 in Lake City, Minnesota, to Harry Doughty McNairy and Clara Christina Moseman. He attended Kenyon College where he was a member of Sigma Pi fraternity and attended seminary at Bexley Hall. He married Cary Elizabeth Fleming in November 1935 and they had three children.

McNairy was ordained a Deacon in May 1934 and a Priest in April 1935. He began his active ministry at St. Andrew's Mission in Columbus, Ohio. He subsequently became rector of St. Stephen's in Cincinnati, and in 1940 went to St. Paul, Minnesota as rector of Christ Church. During his decade in St. Paul he was active as: president of University House Corporation, the directing body for Episcopal work on the campus at the University of Minnesota; president of the Council of Social Agencies and the St. Paul Council of Human Relations; and chairman of the department of Christian education in the diocese.

In 1950 he became Dean of St. Paul’s Cathedral in Buffalo, New York. While in Buffalo he gave a series of radio addresses. Some of these addresses he used as the foundation for his book Family Story which was published in 1960.

He served as Suffragan Bishop of Minnesota from 1958-1968, Bishop Coadjutor of Minnesota from 1968-1970. He was elected Bishop of Minnesota in 1971 and served until his retirement in 1978. He died on December 8, 1989, in the Metropolitan Mount Sinai Hospital, Minneapolis.

== See also ==
- List of Succession of Bishops for the Episcopal Church, USA
