= Stephen Keeler =

American bishop (1887–1956)

The Right Reverend Stephen Edwards Keeler D.D., S.T.D.
- Bishop of Minnesota
- Church: Episcopal Church
- Diocese: Minnesota
- In office: 1943–1956
- Predecessor: Frank McElwain
- Successor: Hamilton Hyde Kellogg
- Previous post: Coadjutor Bishop of Minnesota (1931-1943)

Orders
- Ordination: June 3, 1914 by Chauncey B. Brewster
- Consecration: June 24, 1931 by Frederick Bingham Howden

Personal details
- Born: April 16, 1887 New Canaan, Connecticut, United States
- Died: September 25, 1956 (aged 69) Patrick Henry Village, Heidelberg, West Germany
- Buried: St Mark's Cathedral, Minneapolis
- Denomination: Anglican
- Parents: Stephen Edwards Keeler & Annie Demarest Husted
- Spouse: Eunice Daskam Stevens (m. 1915)
- Children: 1
- Education: Yale University

Stephen Edwards Keeler (April 16, 1887 – September 25, 1956) was the fourth diocesan bishop of Minnesota in The Episcopal Church.

== Early life and education ==
Keeler was born on April 16, 1887, in New Canaan, Connecticut, the son of Stephen Edwards Keeler and Annie Demarest Husted. He was educated at the Hoosick Preparatory School in Hoosick, New York. He then studied at Yale University, from where he earned a Bachelor of Arts in 1910. he also graduated with a Bachelor of Divinity from the General Theological Seminary in 1913. He was awarded a Doctor of Divinity by Kenyon College in 1928, and a Doctor of Sacred Theology from the General Theological Seminary in 1932.

== Ordained ministry ==
Keeler was ordained deacon on June 4, 1913 and priest on June 3, 1914. He served as a curate at St Paul's Church in Cleveland, Ohio between 1913 and 1915, and then as rector of St Stephen's Church in Pittsfield, Massachusetts between 1915 and 1923. In 1923, he became rector of St Paul's Church in Akron, Ohio, while in 1928 he transferred to Chicago to serve as rector of St Chrysostom's Church, where he remained till 1931.

== Bishop ==
Keeler was consecrated as bishop coadjutor of Minnesota on June 24, 1931.

Keeler died on a trip to Germany in 1956 and was buried at St. Mark's Cathedral in Minneapolis, which he consecrated in 1941.

== See also ==
- Historical list of bishops of the Episcopal Church in the United States of America
