= Hamilton Hyde Kellogg =

American bishop (1899–1977)

The Right Reverend Hamilton Hyde Kellogg D.D., S.T.D., LL.D.
- Bishop of Minnesota
- Church: Episcopal Church
- Diocese: Minnesota
- Elected: February 21, 1952
- In office: 1956–1970
- Predecessor: Stephen Keeler
- Successor: Philip McNairy
- Previous post: Coadjutor Bishop of Minnesota (1952-1956)

Orders
- Ordination: December 1924 by Edward H. Coley
- Consecration: June 24, 1952 by Henry Knox Sherrill

Personal details
- Born: September 6, 1899 Skaneateles, New York, United States
- Died: July 5, 1977 (aged 77) Minneapolis, Minnesota, United States
- Buried: Pine Hill Cemetery, Chester
- Denomination: Anglican
- Parents: Walter Hamilton Kellogg & Jennie Louise Kellogg
- Spouse: Mildred Sarah Haley (m. 1929)

Hamilton Hyde Kellogg (September 6, 1899 - July 5, 1977) was the fifth bishop of Minnesota in The Episcopal Church.

== Early life and education ==
Kellogg was born on September 6, 1899, in Skaneateles, New York, the son of Walter Hamilton Kellogg & Jennie Louise Kellogg. He was educated at the High School in Skaneateles and then at the Lawrenceville School, graduating in 1917. He then studied at Williams College, from where he graduated with a Bachelor of Arts in 1921, and was awarded a Doctor of Divinity in 1944. He also earned a Master of Arts from Columbia University in 1924. He also attended the General Theological Seminary, graduating with a Bachelor of Divinity in 1924, and earning a Doctor of Sacred Theology in 1946. The University of the South also awarded him a Doctor of Divinity in 1946, while he was awarded another by Seabury-Western Theological Seminary in 1957. Syracuse University awarded him with a Doctor of Laws in 1956.

== Ordained ministry ==
Kellogg was ordained deacon in April 1924 by Bishop Charles Fiske, and priest in December 1924 by Bishop Edward H. Coley. He married Mildred Sarah Haley on June 10, 1929. He served as priest-in-charge of St Alban's Church in Syracuse, New York, between 1924 and 1925, and then assistant priest at Christ Church in Greenwich, Connecticut, between 1925 and 1929. In 1929, he became rector of St James' Church in Danbury, Connecticut, where he served till 1941. In 1941, he became an Army chaplain, and he traveled extensively, and during World War II ministered to troops during the Battle of the Bulge and the crossing of the Rhine. After the end of the war, he became rector of Christ Church in Houston, Texas, and then became its first Dean once Christ Church became the diocesan cathedral.

== Bishop ==
Kellogg was elected Coadjutor Bishop of Minnesota on February 21, 1952, during a special diocesan convention. He was consecrated as bishop coadjutor in St. Mark's Cathedral in Minneapolis on June 24, 1952. He then was installed as diocesan bishop on December 4, 1956, and retained the post until his retirement on December 31, 1970.

== See also ==
- List of Succession of Bishops for the Episcopal Church, USA

== References and external links ==
- The Episcopal Diocese of Minnesota
