= Frank McElwain =

American bishop

The Right Reverend Frank McElwain D.D.
- Bishop of Minnesota
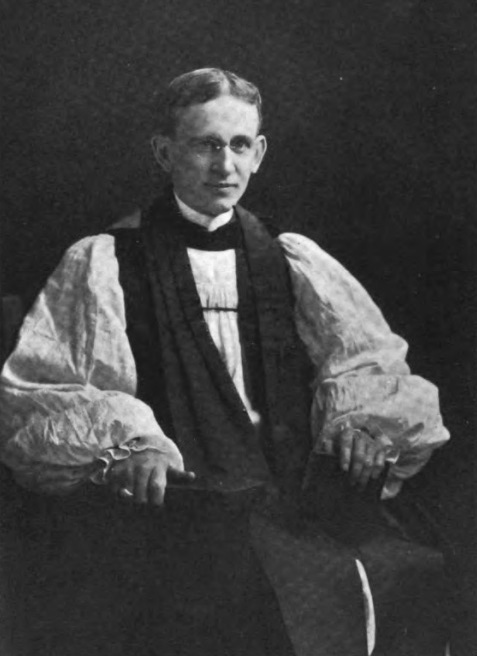
- Church: Episcopal Church
- Diocese: Minnesota
- Elected: May 23, 1917
- In office: 1917–1943
- Predecessor: Samuel Cook Edsall
- Successor: Stephen Keeler
- Previous post: Suffragan Bishop of Minnesota (1912-1917)

Orders
- Ordination: February 6, 1903 by Edward Robert Atwill
- Consecration: October 30, 1912 by Daniel S. Tuttle

Personal details
- Born: December 14, 1875 Warsaw, New York, United States
- Died: September 19, 1957 (aged 81) Lexington, North Carolina, United States
- Buried: Maple Lawn Cemetery, Faribault
- Denomination: Anglican
- Parents: James Frank Mcelwain & Mary Stewart (Arthur
- Spouse: Helen Cantwell De Muth (m. 1883; died 1916) Mabel Collins Lofstrom (m. 1820)
- Children: 3
- Education: Trinity College

Frank Arthur McElwain (December 14, 1875 – September 19, 1957) was a Bishop of Minnesota in The Episcopal Church.

== Early life and education ==
McElwain was born on December 14, 1875, in Warsaw, New York, the son of James Frank McElwain and Mary Stewart Arthur. He studied at Trinity College from where he graduated with a Bachelor of Arts in 1899, a Master of Arts in 1902, and awarded a Doctor of Divinity in 1913. He also earned a Bachelor of Divinity from Seabury-Western Theological Seminary in 1902.

== Ordained ministry ==
McElwain was ordained deacon on June 11, 1902, and priest on February 6, 1903, by Bishop Edward Robert Atwill. He then ministered in Missouri between 1902 and 1905. In 1905, he became an instructor in the Old and New Testament at the Seabury Divinity School, while in 1907, he was elected warden of the school.

== Bishop ==
McElwain was elected Suffragan Bishop of Minnesota in 1912, and was consecrated in the Cathedral of Our Merciful Saviour on October 30, 1912. He was elected diocesan bishop on May 23, 1917, and served as diocesan bishop from 1917 until 1943. McElwain also served as dean of Seabury-Western Theological Seminary and was the author of The Permanent Element in Old Testament Prophecy.
