= Episcopal Church in Minnesota =

Diocese of the Episcopal Church in the United States

Coordinates: 44°59′55.9″N 93°17′39.6″W

Episcopal Church in Minnesota Diœcesis Minnesotensis
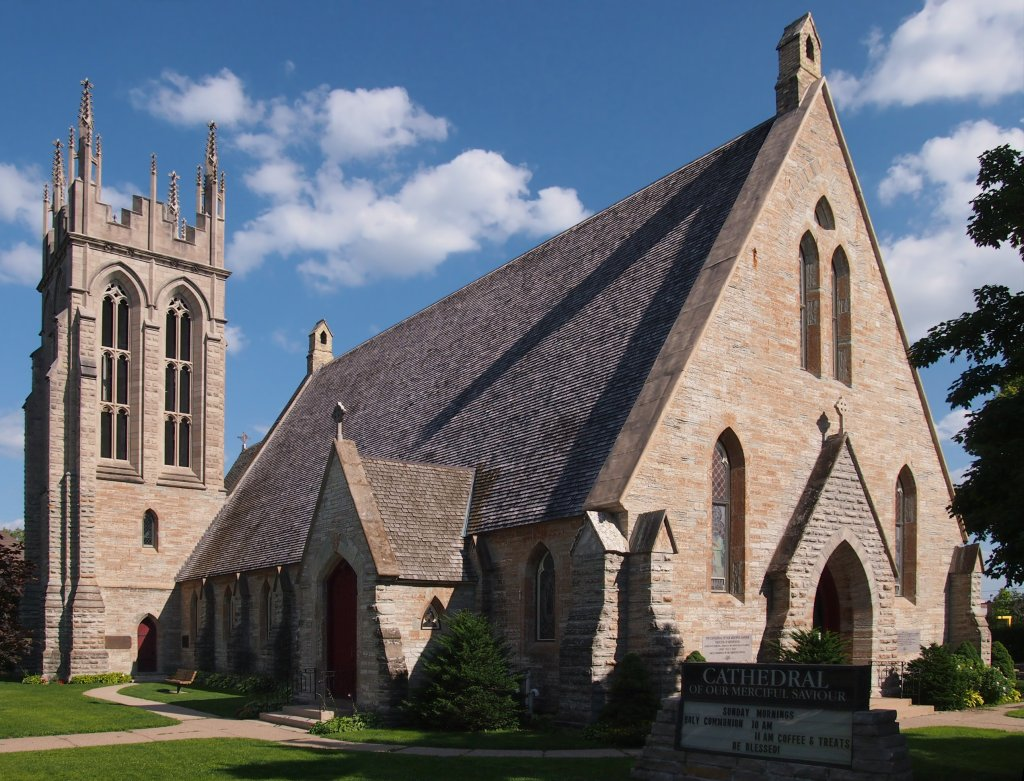
- The Cathedral of Our Merciful Saviour, founded by the first bishop of Minnesota

Location
- Country: United States
- Territory: Minnesota
- Ecclesiastical province: Province VI

Statistics
- Congregations: 89 (2024)
- Members: 13,163 (2025)

Information
- Denomination: The Episcopal Church
- Established: September 16, 1857
- Cathedral: Cathedral of Our Merciful Saviour (Faribault); St. Mark's Cathedral (Minneapolis)

Current leadership
- Bishop: Craig Loya

Map
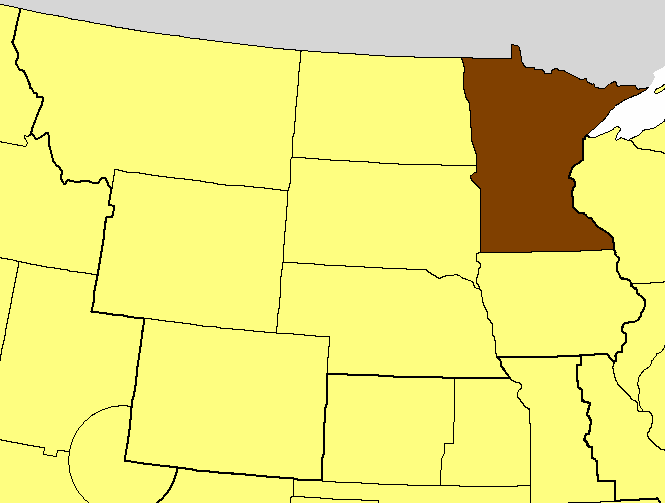
- Location of the Episcopal Church in Minnesota

Website
- www.episcopalmn.org

The Episcopal Church in Minnesota, formerly known as the Episcopal Diocese of Minnesota, is a diocese of the Episcopal Church in the United States of America which has jurisdiction over all of Minnesota, except Clay County, which is in the Episcopal Diocese of North Dakota. It is in Province VI and its offices are in Minneapolis. It has two cathedrals: the Cathedral of Our Merciful Saviour in Faribault and St. Mark's Episcopal Cathedral in Minneapolis. As of December 2013, there were 20,964 members. It has 110 faith communities (this includes 105 churches and the organizations Episcopal Homes of Minnesota, the Episcopal House of Prayer, The Sheltering Arms Foundation, Breck School, and Shattuck-St. Mary’s School). It is affiliated with the Minnesota Council of Churches, The Joint Religious Legislative Coalition, and The Resource Center for Churches. Henry Benjamin Whipple was the first bishop of the Episcopal Church in Minnesota. Craig Loya is the current bishop. The Diocese of Duluth was established as a Missionary Diocese from the Diocese of Minnesota in 1895 and was merged back into the Diocese of Minnesota on May 24, 1944.

In 2025, the diocese reported average Sunday attendance (ASA) of 3,583 persons, a relative decrease from 6,349 reported in 2015. Membership statistics for 2025 reported 13,163 members, also down from 19,724 in 2015. Plate and pledge income for the 89 filing congregations of the diocese in 2025 was $13,900,000.

== Bishops of Minnesota ==
1. Henry Benjamin Whipple 1859 - 1901
  * Mahlon Norris Gilbert, coadjutor 1886-1900
2. Samuel Cook Edsall 1901 - 1917
3. Frank Arthur McElwain 1917 - 1943
4. Stephen Edwards Keeler 1943 - 1956
  * Benjamin Tibbets Kemerer, suffragan 1944-1948
5. Hamilton Hyde Kellogg 1956 - 1971
6. Philip Frederick McNairy 1971 - 1978
7. Robert Marshall Anderson 1978 - 1993
  * Sandy Hampton, suffragan 1989-1995
8. James Louis Jelinek 1993 - 2010
9. Brian Norman Prior 2010 - 2020
10. Craig Loya June 6, 2020 -

Craig Loya

== Records ==
Records of the Episcopal Church in Minnesota are available at the Minnesota Historical Society. They cover the period from the arrival of the first Episcopal missionaries into the area in the 1820s through the bishopric of Robert M. Anderson, which ended in 1993. They document the organization, administration, and history of the diocese and its parishes and missions through the records of the diocesan offices and parishes and the papers of numerous diocesan officials and leaders, including George Clinton Tanner, Stephen E. Keeler, Frederick F. Kramer, Hamilton Hyde Kellogg, Philip F. McNairy, and Robert M. Anderson.
