= Mahlon Norris Gilbert =

American coadjutor bishop (1848–1900)

The Right Reverend Mahlon Norris Gilbert D.D., S.T.D.
- Coadjutor Bishop of Minnesota
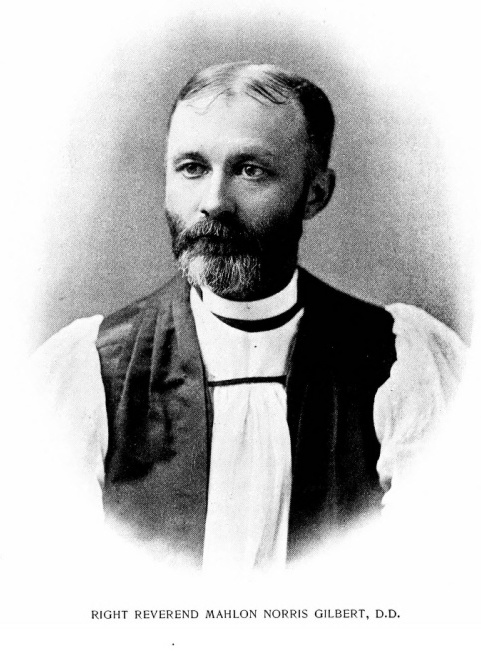
- Church: Episcopal Church
- Diocese: Minnesota
- Elected: 1886
- In office: 1886–1900

Orders
- Ordination: October 17, 1875 by Daniel S. Tuttle
- Consecration: October 17, 1886 by Alfred Lee

Personal details
- Born: March 23, 1848 Morris, New York, United States
- Died: March 2, 1900 (aged 51) Saint Paul, Minnesota, United States
- Buried: Oakland Cemetery, Saint Paul
- Denomination: Anglican
- Parents: Norris Gilbert & Lucy Todd
- Spouse: Fannie Pierpont Carvill (m. 1880)
- Children: 2

Mahlon Norris Gilbert (March 23, 1848 – March 2, 1900) was coadjutor bishop of the Episcopal Diocese of Minnesota from 1886 to 1900 during the diocesan tenure of Henry Benjamin Whipple.

== Early life and education ==
Gilbert was born on March 23, 1848, in Morris, New York, the son of Norris Gilbert and Lucy Todd. He received his early education at the Fairfield Academy, and then at Hobart College in 1866. Due to poor health, he left college prior to the completion of his course, and moved to Florida for the benefit of his health. Some time later, he took charge of the Good Shepherd School in Ogden, Utah. He also enrolled at the Seabury-Western Theological Seminary in 1872, and graduated with a Bachelor of Divinity in 1875. He was awarded honorary Doctor of Divinity degrees from Seabury and Hobart College, respectively, and a Doctor of Sacred Theology from Racine College.

== Ordained ministry ==
Gilbert was ordained deacon on June 20, 1875, by Bishop Henry Benjamin Whipple of Minnesota in the Cathedral of Our Merciful Saviour, and was then given charge of a mission in Deer Lodge, Montana. He was ordained priest on October 17, 1875, by Bishop Daniel S. Tuttle in St James' Church, Deer Lodge, Montana, after which he continued with his mission work in Montana. In 1881, he became rector of Christ Church in Saint Paul, Minnesota, where he remained till 1886.

== Bishop ==
In 1886, Gilbert was elected Coadjutor Bishop of Minnesota, and was consecrated on October 17, 1886, with Presiding Bishop Alfred Lee as chief consecrator, in St James' Church, Chicago. He never succeeded as diocesan, as he died on March 2, 1900, in Saint Paul, Minnesota.

== Lineage ==
2. Norris Gilbert, 1811–1877. Lucy Todd, 1813–1891.

3. Elijah Gilbert, 1775–1862. Lois Ward, 1773–1856.

4. Ambrose Ward, 1747–1819. Lois Meigs, 1750–1826.

5. Jonathan Meigs, ....-1765.

6. Capt. Jonathan Meigs, 1672–1739. Hannah Willard, 1698-...

7. Josiah Willard -1674. Hannah Hosmer -....

8. Major Simon Willard, 1605–1676. Mary Sharpe, -

Seventh in descent from Major Simon Willard of Concord and Charlestown, Mass.
