= Craig Loya =

American bishop (born 1977)

The Right Reverend Craig Loya
- Bishop of Minnesota
- Loya with mitre and vestments
- Church: The Episcopal Church
- Diocese: Minnesota
- Elected: January 25, 2020
- In office: 2020–present
- Predecessor: Brian Prior

Orders
- Ordination: 2003
- Consecration: June 6, 2020 by Brian Prior

Personal details
- Born: April 5, 1977 (age 49)
- Denomination: Anglican
- Spouse: Melissa Tubbs (m. 2004)
- Children: 2
- Education: Hastings College

Craig William Loya (born April 5, 1977) is the tenth bishop of the Episcopal Church in Minnesota. He was formerly Dean of Trinity Cathedral in Omaha, Nebraska.

== Life and career ==
Loya in 2026

Loya was raised in Nebraska where he graduated from North Platte High School and Hastings College. He earned a Master of Divinity from Yale in conjunction with Berkeley Divinity School in 2002. He and Melissa Tubbs married in 2004. They have two children.

On January 25, 2020, the Feast of the Conversion of Saint Paul, the Episcopal Church in Minnesota diocesan convention elected him on the second ballot from a slate of five candidates. On the ember day of June 6, 2020, he was ordained as the tenth bishop of Minnesota at the Cathedral of St. Mark in Minneapolis. Brian Prior, the prior bishop of Minnesota, served as chief consecrator. Joseph Scott Barker and Bruce Edward Caldwell were the co-consecrators.

Loya is a member of the Society of Catholic Priests, an Anglo-Catholic association of clergy in The Episcopal Church.

Preceded by Brian Prior	Bishop of Minnesota; 2020-Present	Succeeded by Incumbent
