= Robert Marshall Anderson =

Episcopal Bishop of Minnesota (1933–2011)

The Right Reverend Robert Marshall Anderson
- Bishop of Minnesota
- Anderson's episcopal vestments displayed in the Cathedral of Our Merciful Saviour
- Church: The Episcopal Church
- Diocese: Minnesota
- Elected: 1977
- In office: 1978–1993
- Predecessor: Philip McNairy
- Successor: James L. Jelinek
- Previous post: Coadjutor Bishop of Minnesota (1978)

Orders
- Ordination: April 30, 1962 by Walter H. Gray
- Consecration: February 11, 1978 by John Allin

Personal details
- Born: December 18, 1933 New York City, New York, US
- Died: May 3, 2011 (aged 77) Minneapolis, Minnesota, US
- Buried: Cathedral Center of St. Paul, Los Angeles
- Denomination: Anglican
- Parents: Arthur Harold Anderson & Hazel Schneider
- Spouse: Mary Artemis Evans (m. 1960)
- Children: 4
- Education: Colgate University

Robert Marshall Anderson (December 18, 1933 - May 3, 2011) was the Seventh Bishop of Minnesota in The Episcopal Church.

== Early life and education ==
Anderson was born on December 18, 1933, in Staten Island, New York City, the son of Arthur Harold Anderson and Hazel Schneider. He studied at Colgate University, from where he graduated with a Bachelor of Arts in 1955. After graduation, he enrolled to serve in the U.S. Army's 24th Infantry Division during the Korean War between 1955 and 1956. Upon his return to the United States, he enrolled in Berkeley Divinity School, from where he earned his Bachelor of Sacred Theology in 1961. He was awarded an honorary Doctor of Divinity from Berkeley Divinity School in 1977, and from Seabury-Western Theological Seminary in 1978. He married Mary Artemis Evans on August 24, 1960, and together they had four children.

== Ordained ministry ==
Anderson was ordained deacon on June 13, 1961, and then priest on April 30, 1962, by Bishop Walter H. Gray of Connecticut. He served at St John's Church in Stamford, Connecticut, first as curate between 1961 and 1963, then as vicar between 1963 and 1967, and then as associate rector between 1968 and 1972. Between 1963 and 1967, he was also priest-in-charge of Christ Church in East Hampton, Connecticut, and then briefly as its rector between 1967 and 1968. In 1972, he was appointed as Dean of St Mark's Cathedral in Salt Lake City, where he remained until 1978.

== Episcopacy ==
In 1977, the diocesan convention elected Anderson as Coadjutor Bishop of Minnesota, and he was consecrated bishop on February 11, 1978. He then succeeded as diocesan bishop that same year. During his time in Minnesota, Anderson oversaw the construction of a diocesan House of Prayer in Collegeville, Minnesota, served as a representative to the Consultation on Church Union, and prioritized Native American ministries within the diocese. He was also a significant contributor to guidelines relating to clergy discipline and misconduct, and placed women, gay and lesbian clergy in church leadership positions. Anderson retired in 1993, and then served as Assistant Bishop of Los Angeles between 1995 and 2008. He died of Pancreatic cancer on May 3, 2011, in Minneapolis.

== See also ==
- Historical list of bishops of the Episcopal Church in the United States of America
