= Sandy Hampton =

American bishop

The Right Reverend Sandy Hampton
- Suffragan Bishop of Minnesota
- Church: Episcopal Church
- Diocese: Minnesota
- Elected: October 29, 1988
- In office: 1989–1995
- Other posts: Assistant Bishop of Olympia; Assistant Bishop of Oregon

Orders
- Ordination: December 17, 1966 (priest) by Frank Burrill
- Consecration: April 5, 1989 by Edmond L. Browning

Personal details
- Born: April 11, 1935 Passaic, New Jersey, United States
- Died: June 28, 2024 (aged 89) San Diego, United States
- Denomination: Anglican
- Parents: Sanford & Renee Hampton
- Spouse: Marilynn (m. 1953)
- Children: 4

Sanford Zangwill Kaye "Sandy" Hampton (April 11, 1935 – June 28, 2024) was an American bishop of The Episcopal Church who served in Minnesota, Western Washington, and Oregon.

== Early life and education ==
Born in Passaic, New Jersey in 1935 to Sanford and Renee Hampton, he studied at Northwestern University from where he graduated with a Bachelor of Arts in 1956. He then built a career in sales and marketing in Chicago before joining the Seabury-Western Theological Seminary where he trained for the priesthood and earned a Bachelor of Divinity in 1966, and a Doctor of Divinity in 1990. He married Marilynn in 1953 and together had four children.

== Ordained Ministry ==
Hampton was ordained deacon on June 11, 1966 by Bishop James W. Montgomery, and priest on December 17, 1966 by Bishop Frank Burrill of Chicago. He was curate of the Church of St John the Evangelist in Flossmoor, Illinois from 1966 to 1967 and then rector of St James' Church in Midvale, Utah from 1967 until 1972. In 1972 he transferred to Moab, Utah to serve as vicar of St Francis Church. In 1977 he became rector of St Peter's Church in La Grande, Oregon, while in 1980 he became rector of St Barnabas' Church in Temple Hills, Maryland where he remained until 1989.

== Episcopacy ==
On October 29, 1988, Hampton was elected on the fourth ballot as Suffragan Bishop of Minnesota. He was then consecrated bishop on April 5, 1989 at the Cathedral of St Mark in Minneapolis by Presiding Bishop Edmond L. Browning. He retained the post until 1995 when he was elected as Assisting Bishop of Olympia, which post he commenced on October 1, 1995. While in Olympia he was responsible for multi-cultural and specialized ministries. He left Olympia in 2003 and served for some time at St. Stephen's Church in Oak Harbor, Washington. In 2008 he was named Assistant Bishop of Oregon and installed on April 18, 2008. He retired from Oregon in 2010 and died in San Diego on June 28, 2024.
