= Vernon Center, Minnesota =

City in Minnesota, United States

Vernon Center
- City
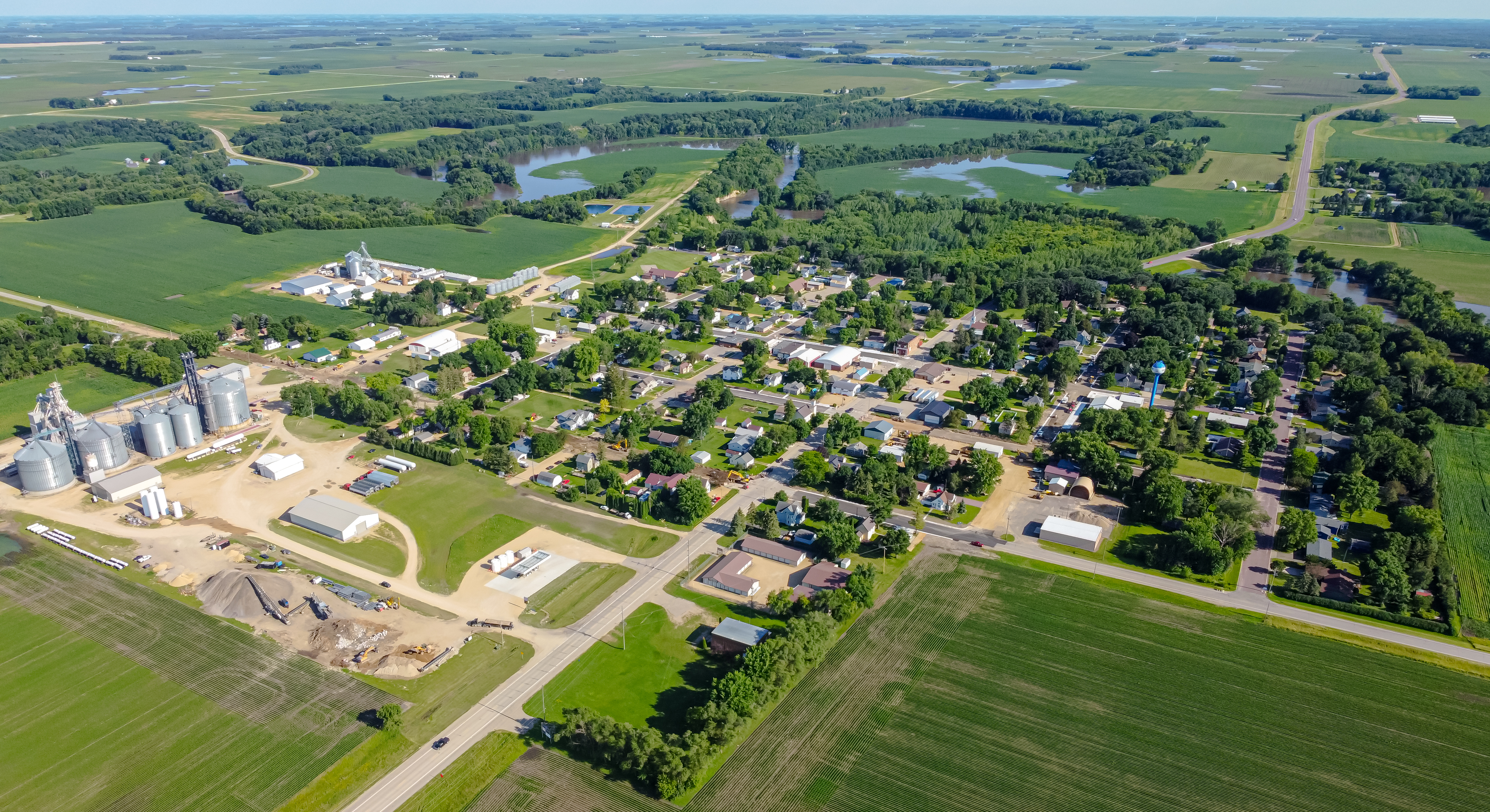
- US-169 runs though town

- Location of Vernon Center, Minnesota
- Coordinates: 43°57′46″N 94°09′59″W
- Country: United States
- State: Minnesota
- County: Blue Earth

Government
  - Type: Mayor - Council
  - Mayor: Dana Ziegler

Area
  - Total: 0.50 sq mi (1.29 km^{2})
  - Land: 0.49 sq mi (1.27 km^{2})
  - Water: 0.012 sq mi (0.03 km^{2})
- Elevation: 1,024 ft (312 m)

Population (2020)
  - Total: 328
  - Density: 671.1/sq mi (259.12/km^{2})
- Time zone: UTC-6 (Central (CST))
  - Summer (DST): UTC-5 (CDT)
- ZIP code: 56090
- Area code: 507
- FIPS code: 27-66910
- GNIS feature ID: 2397130
- Website: https://vernoncentermn.com/

Vernon Center is a city in Blue Earth County, Minnesota, United States, along the Blue Earth River. The population was 328 at the 2020 census. It is part of the Mankato-North Mankato Metropolitan Statistical Area.

== Geography ==
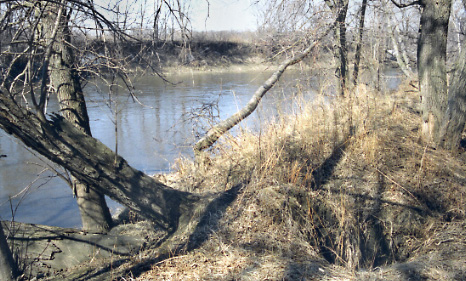
The Blue Earth River at Vernon Center

According to the United States Census Bureau, the city has an area of 0.50 square miles (1.29 km^{2}); 0.49 square miles (1.27 km^{2}) is land and the remainder water.

U.S. Route 169 serves as a main route in the community.

== Demographics ==
Historical population
Census	Pop.	Note	%±
1880	125		—
1900	311		—
1910	289		−7.1%
1920	283		−2.1%
1930	306		8.1%
1940	355		16.0%
1950	344		−3.1%
1960	333		−3.2%
1970	347		4.2%
1980	365		5.2%
1990	339		−7.1%
2000	359		5.9%
2010	332		−7.5%
2020	328		−1.2%
U.S. Decennial Census; 2020 Census

=== 2010 census ===
At the 2010 census, the city had 332 people, 132 households and 90 families. The population density was 677.6 inhabitants per square mile (261.6/km^{2}). Housing units numbered 142 at an average density of 289.8 per square mile (111.9/km^{2}). The racial makeup of the city was 98.8% White, 0.9% African American, and 0.3% from two or more races. Hispanic or Latino of any race were 1.8% of the population.

36.4% of 132 households had children under the age of 18 living in them, 59.1% were married couples living together, 7.6% had a female householder with no husband present, 1.5% had a male householder with no wife present, and 31.8% were non-families. 25.8% of all households were made up of individuals, and 12.8% had someone living alone who was 65 years of age or older. The average household size was 2.52 and the average family size was 3.11.

The median age was 34.4 years. 29.2% of residents were under the age of 18; 4.7% were between the ages of 18 and 24; 31.2% were from 25 to 44; 23.4% were from 45 to 64; and 11.1% were 65 years of age or older. The population were 46.7% male and 53.3% female.

=== 2000 census ===
At the 2000 census, the city's population comprised 359 people, 132 households and 99 families, with a population density of 727.2 per square mile (282.9/km^{2}). The 137 housing units were at an average density of 277.5 per square mile (107.1/km^{2}). The racial makeup of the city was 99.72% White and 0.28% Pacific Islander. Hispanic or Latino of any race were 1.39% of the population.

40.2% of 132 households had children under the age of 18 living in them, 68.9% were married couples living together, 4.5% had a female householder with no husband present, and 25.0% were non-families. 22.7% of all households were made up of individuals, and 14.4% had someone living alone who was 65 years of age or older. The average household size was 2.72 and the average family size was 3.14.

29.0% of the population were under the age of 18, 6.4% from 18 to 24, 27.6% from 25 to 44, 21.7% from 45 to 64, and 15.3% who were 65 years of age or older. The median age was 34 years. For every 100 females, there were 92.0 males. For every 100 females age 18 and over, there were 100.8 males.

The median household income was $50,703 and the median family income was $56,875. Males had a median income of $34,500 compared with $21,806 for females. The per capita income for the city was $20,693. None of the families and 1.5% of the population were living below the poverty line, including no under eighteens and 1.8% of those over 64.

== History ==
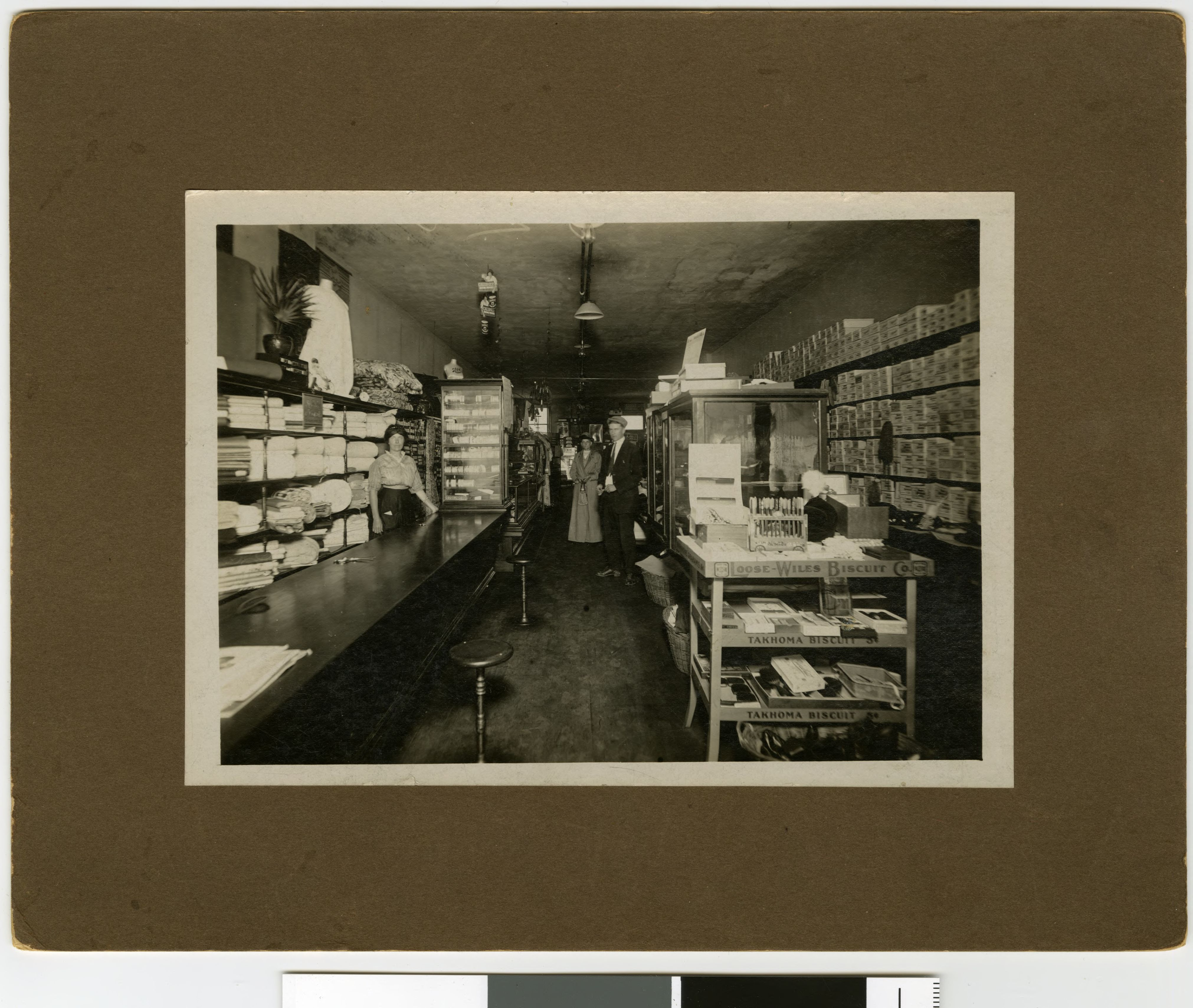
Art Mattson Store, Vernon Center, Minnesota

Vernon Center was platted in 1857. It was named after Mount Vernon, the estate of George Washington.

On the morning of October 25, 2005, the grain elevator in downtown Vernon Center, filled with 200,000 bushels (5,000 metric tons) of corn, exploded, injuring six people. Flames from the explosion shot about 200 feet (61 meters) in the air.

== Notable persons ==
- Benjamin Tibbets Kemerer, Episcopal bishop, was born in Vernon Center.
- Harvey F. Thew, screenwriter, was born in Vernon Center.
