= Flag of the Anglican Communion =

Anglican Communion
- Proportion: 2:3
- Adopted: 1954
- Design: On a blue field, a golden compass rose, inlaid with a shield bearing Saint George's Cross surrounded by the inscription Η ΑΛΗΘΕΙΑ ΕΛΕΥΘΕΡΩΣΕΙ ΥΜΑΣ (Koine Greek for 'the truth will set you free'), topped with a golden bishop's mitre
- Designed by: Canon Edward N. West; Father Andrew Notere

The first use of the Compass rose emblem of the Anglican Communion was occasioned by the convening in 1954 of "The First World Congress of the Anglican Communion" at the St. Mark's Episcopal Cathedral (Minneapolis), Minnesota, as is memorialized in stone at the crossing of the cathedral. It was designed in that year for the Congress by Canon Edward N. West of the Cathedral Church of Saint John the Divine in New York. The Compass rose was modernized in 1988 and the new design was laid into the floor of Canterbury Cathedral during the Twelfth Lambeth Conference of Anglican bishops.

At the centre of the circular emblem is Saint George's Cross, a reminder of the origins of the Anglican Communion and a link unifying the past to the Communion today. Encircling the cross is a band bearing the inscription "The Truth shall make you free" (John 8:32). It is written in the original New Testament Greek, the traditional language of scholarship within the Anglican Communion. From the band radiate the points of the compass. The compass symbolizes the worldwide spread of the Anglican Faith. Surmounting the shield, at the North, is a mitre, the symbol of apostolic order essential to all Churches and Provinces constituting the Anglican Communion.

The design was adapted with the colors of blue and gold and made into a flag by Canadian-born priest Father Andrew Notere. The Archbishop of Canterbury received the first flag at Lambeth Palace in December 1990, and the flag was officially inaugurated at the Meeting of the Primates of the Communion in Belfast in April 1991.

It was later updated by SWB Creative, creating a scalable version of the logo as part of the new brand guidelines.
