= James L. Jelinek =

Episcopal bishop

The Right Reverend James L. Jelinek
- Bishop of Minnesota
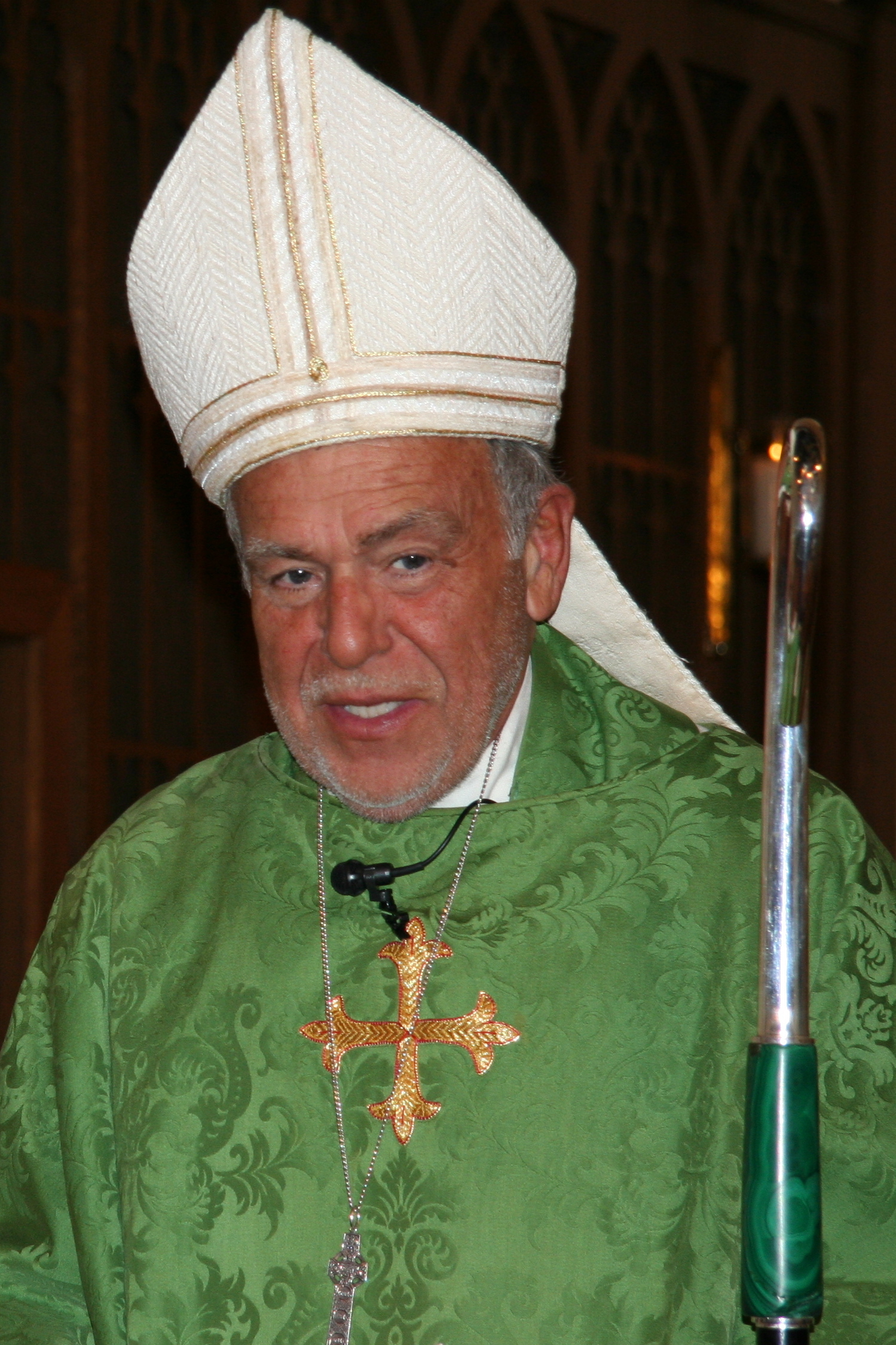
- Jelinek, vested, at Rochester, Minnesota.
- Church: Episcopal Church
- Diocese: Diocese of Minnesota
- Elected: May 1, 1993
- In office: 1993–2010
- Predecessor: Robert Marshall Anderson
- Successor: Brian Prior

Orders
- Ordination: January 1971 by J. Milton Richardson
- Consecration: October 29, 1993 by Edmond L. Browning

Personal details
- Born: May 9, 1942 (age 84) Milwaukee, Wisconsin, United States
- Denomination: Anglican
- Parents: James F. Jelinek & Ruth Dorothy Scaman
- Spouse: Marilyn Kay Wall (m. 1988)
- Children: 1
- Education: Carthage College

James "Jim" Louis Jelinek (born May 9, 1942) was the eighth Bishop of Minnesota in the Episcopal Church (United States) until his retirement on 13 February 2010.

== Education and career ==
Born and raised in Wisconsin, Jelinek graduated from Carthage College in Kenosha, Wisconsin in 1964, and attended The General Theological Seminary in New York City, graduating in 1970. Between 1964 and 1967, he did some postgraduate studies at Vanderbilt University. He was ordained deacon in 1970, and priest in 1971. He served as assistant rector of St Bartholomew's Church in Nashville, Tennessee between 1971 and 1972, and then program developer of Youth Services in Memphis, Tennessee between 1972 and 1973. In 1972, he also became associate rector of the Church of the Holy Communion in Memphis, serving till 1977. Between 1977 and 1984. he was rector of St Michael and All Angels' Church in Cincinnati, while in 1985, he moved to San Francisco to become rector of St Aidan’s Church.

== Episcopacy ==
Jelenik was consecrated the eighth bishop of Minnesota on October 29, 1993. His episcopacy was noted for its focus on immigrants and refugees that began with an outreach to Latinos and to Hmong.

== Retirement Years ==
In retirement, Bishop Jelinek served as interim rector of St. Paul's Episcopal in Washington, D.C. from 2013 to 2015 and in 2019-2020, Trinity Church, Newport, Rhode Island.

== See also ==
- Historical list of bishops of the Episcopal Church in the United States of America

Anglican Communion titles
Preceded by Robert Marshall Anderson	Bishop of Minnesota; 1993–2010	Succeeded by Brian Prior
