= Benjamin Tibbets Kemerer =

American Episcopalian bishop

- Church: The Episcopal Church

Orders
- Ordination: June 28, 1903
- Consecration: November 5, 1930

Personal details
- Born: Vernon Center, Minnesota
- Died: September 23, 1960 Friendship, Maine

Benjamin Tibbets Kemerer (December 9, 1874 – September 23, 1960) was an American Episcopalian bishop.

== Early life ==
Born in Vernon Center, Minnesota, Kemerer was a salesman and advertising manager. He went to Hamline University from 1890 to 1894 and then received his doctorate in theology in 1931 from Seabury Theological Seminary.

== Ordained ministry ==
Kemerer was ordained deacon on June 28, 1903, in St James' Church, St. Louis and then to the priesthood on November 17, 1904, in Trinity Church, St. Charles, Missouri.

== Episcopacy ==
From 1930 to 1933, Kemerer served as coadjutor bishop of the Episcopal Diocese of Duluth. He then served as bishop of the Episcopal Diocese from 1933 until 1944 when the diocese was reunited with the Episcopal Diocese of Minnesota. He then served as suffragan bishop of the Diocese of Minnesota from 1944 until his retirement in 1948.
