= Henry Benjamin Whipple =

Bishop of Minnesota (1822–1901)

The Right Reverend Henry Benjamin Whipple D.D.
- Bishop of Minnesota
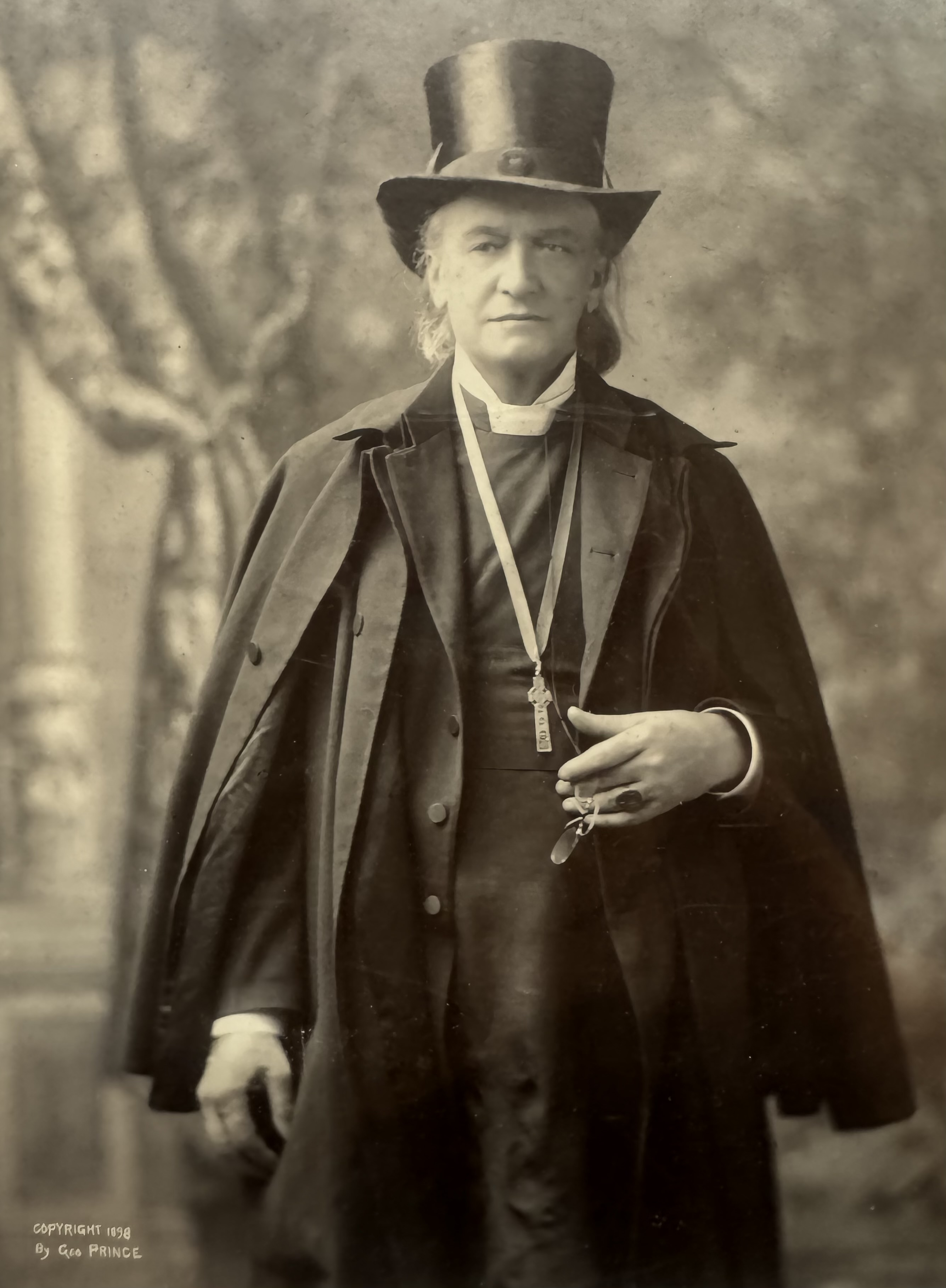
- 1898 studio portrait by George Prince
- Church: Episcopal Church
- Diocese: Minnesota
- Elected: June 30, 1859
- In office: 1859–1901
- Successor: Samuel Cook Edsall

Orders
- Ordination: July 16, 1850 by William H. DeLancey
- Consecration: October 13, 1859 by Jackson Kemper

Personal details
- Born: February 15, 1822 Adams, New York, U.S.
- Died: September 16, 1901 (aged 79) Faribault, Minnesota, U.S.
- Buried: Cathedral of Our Merciful Saviour
- Denomination: Anglican (prev. Presbyterian)
- Parents: John Hall Whipple & Elizabeth Wager
- Spouse: Cornelia Ward Wright (m. 1842; died 1890) Evangeline Marrs Simpson (m. 1896)
- Children: 6

Henry Benjamin Whipple (February 15, 1822 – September 16, 1901) was an American religious leader and activist. He was the first Episcopal bishop of Minnesota and gained a reputation as a humanitarian and an advocate for Native Americans.

After ordination in 1848, Whipple served parishes in Rome, New York, and Chicago, where he gained a reputation for his service to poor immigrant groups. His Chicago ministry drew him to the attention of the newly formed Episcopal Diocese of Minnesota, which elected him its first bishop in 1859. He served until his death in 1901.

Although concerned with establishing his denomination in the new state of Minnesota, Whipple soon began to champion the cause of Native American groups in the state against what he saw as an abusive and corrupt Federal policy towards Native Americans. He is best known for his clemency pleas in favor of a group of Dakota who fought against the United States government in the U.S.-Dakota War of 1862 in the area around New Ulm, Minnesota. On December 26, 1862, the largest mass execution in U.S. history occurred in Mankato during the pause in US military operations. Thirty-eight Dakota were hanged for war crimes in the conflict. A total of 303 were sentenced to be hanged but President Abraham Lincoln commuted 265 in the largest mass commutation on record. Lincoln's intervention was not popular at the time. Two commemorative statues are located on the site of the hangings (now home to the Blue Earth County Library and Reconciliation Park). He was referred to as "Straight Tongue" by some Dakota because of his honesty in dealing with them.

Whipple was a founder of Shattuck St. Mary's school in Faribault, Minnesota, and built the Cathedral of Our Merciful Saviour.

== Early life ==
Born in Adams, New York, Whipple was raised in the Presbyterian church but became an Episcopalian through the influence of his grandparents and his wife, Cornelia, whom he married in 1842.

He was educated at a private boarding school in Clinton, New York, and at Jefferson County Institute in Watertown, New York. From 1838 to 1839, he attended Oberlin Collegiate Institute, but his health failed and his physician recommended an active business life. He worked in his father's business until he was admitted to holy orders in 1848. He was also involved as a district worker in New York's Democratic Party.

From 1847 to 1850, Whipple studied theology with William Dexter Wilson, the rector of Christ Church in Sherburne and later one of the early faculty members of Cornell University.

== Career ==
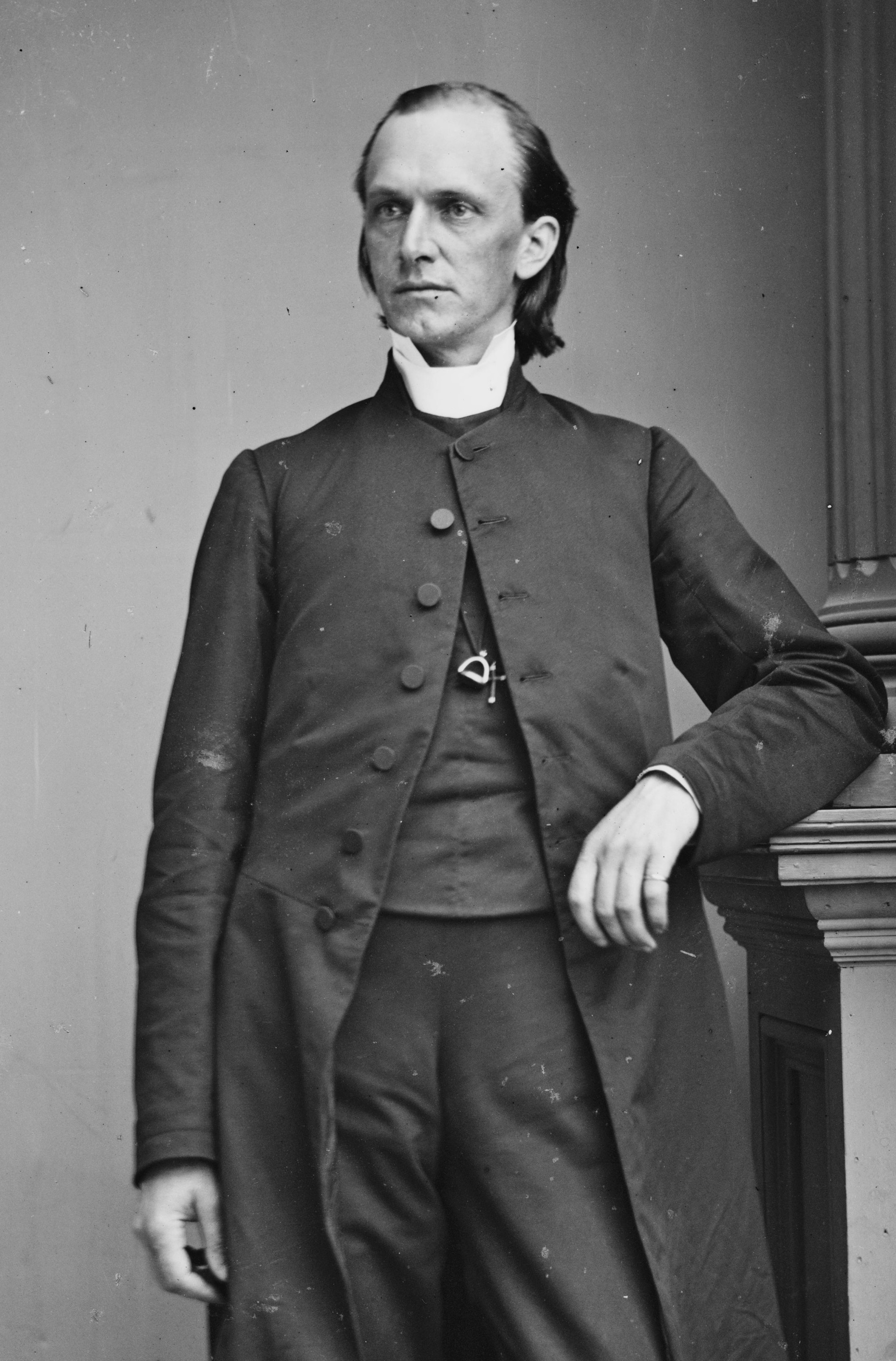
Photograph taken by Mathew Brady about 1860

Whipple was ordained a deacon on August 17, 1849, became rector of Zion Church in Rome, New York, in November 1849, and was ordained priest on July 16, 1850. He served as rector of Zion Church from 1849 to 1857, becoming known both for the size and wealth of his parish and for his work among the poor. He briefly served in St. Augustine, Florida around 1853–54, as he went to Florida for his health.

In 1857, Whipple helped organize and became the first rector of the Church of the Holy Communion on Chicago's South Side, the first free church in the city, meaning that parishioners did not have to pay for their pews. He drew his parishioners from "the highways and the hedges"—clerks, laborers, railroad men, travelers, and derelicts—sought converts among the city's Swedish population, and regularly officiated in a Chicago prison.

=== Election ===
Around fifty delegates from twenty-two Episcopal parishes in Minnesota gathered on June 29, 1859, to elect their first bishop. The Minnesota diocese had previously been part of a seven-state territory presided over by Jackson Kemper. After accepting several new parishes and setting the new bishop's yearly salary at $1,500, nominations and voting began. Clergy nominated several names, and then the lay members of the convention voted. Andrew Paterson and John Ireland Tucker were the two forefront candidates, but neither could secure a clear majority.

Following two days of fruitless voting, the clergymen searched for another name. Paterson admitted that he had written in Whipple and was asked to explain his choice, pointing to Whipple's success with the Church of the Holy Communion. Ezekial Gear and James Lloyd Breck shared their knowledge of Whipple and the clergy decided to present Whipple's name to the laity. When the convention resumed, Whipple was elected unanimously by the clergy and laity. On June 30, 1859, Whipple was elected the first Episcopal bishop of Minnesota, an office he held until his death more than forty years later. He found out from fellow clergyman Robert Clarkson congratulated him on the appointment, before Whipple received his official letter.

Whipple was consecrated bishop on October 13, 1859, the feast day of James, brother of Jesus, at St. James Episcopal Church during the General Convention in Richmond by bishops Jackson Kemper, Leonidas Polk, and William H. DeLancey, with George Burgess delivering the sermon.

=== First Bishop of Minnesota ===
Whipple's new diocese covered nearly 80,000 square miles (210,000 km^{2}), with few roads and scattered settlement as well as an estimate of nearly seventeen thousand "wandering Indians". In December 1859, Whipple made his first visitation of his diocese, including the Ojibwe missions of E. Steele Peake and John Johnson Enmegahbowh. In the spring of 1860 he moved his family to Faribault, establishing it as the see of the diocese.

Whipple supervised the establishment of over 150 churches and supported numerous missions among the Dakota and Ojibwe. Whipple had bronchial problems and operations for nasal polyps, and still traveled and spoke regularly throughout the state. Until the diocese was financially secure, he pledged himself to personally support several of its missionary clergy.

In 1860, Whipple incorporated the Bishop Seabury Mission in Faribault, building it upon the foundations laid by James Lloyd Breck and Solon W. Manny, who in 1858 had founded a divinity school and school for boys and girls. With the help of gifts from eastern donors, the mission developed into three separate but closely connected schools: Seabury Divinity School, Shattuck School for boys, and St. Mary's Hall for the education of daughters of the clergy. Whipple also helped found the Breck School in Wilder, Minnesota, to educate the children of farmers.

Whipple visited soldiers on the front of the Civil War, raised money from Eastern donors following the U.S. Dakota War. His health faltered and Robert Minturn provided funding for Whipple to go to England to regain his health, where he gained support of the Anglican church. Whipple was respected internationally, and attended conferences of the Anglican Communion in London, was in favor of American church missions in Cuba and Puerto Rico, and was a member of the Peabody Education Committee which oversaw the development of schools for formerly enslaved people after the Civil War. In 1871, he was offered the Bishop of the Sandwich Islands but he declined. He spoke with Queen Victoria in 1890, and in 1897 he attended the Lambeth Conference as presiding bishop of the American church.

The diocese grew to 11,495 confirmed members in 160 active congregations under his leadership, not including the Diocese of Duluth.

== Advocate for Native Americans ==
Whipple was best known outside of Minnesota for his dedication to the welfare of the Native Americans and for his missionary work among Dakota and Ojibwe in Minnesota. He returned from his first visitation of his diocese with a firm commitment to establish Native American missions and reform of the United States American Indian system. Whipple regularly included Native American towns on his visitations, built up the Episcopal mission to the Ojibwe based at the White Earth Reservation, and appealed for support of Native American missions by lectures throughout the United States and in Europe.

In the early years of his episcopate, Whipple's espousal of American Indian reform and commitment to Native American missions earned him the enmity of many white settlers who hated Native Americans, and led some of his fellow bishops to look upon him as a fanatic.

Whipple repeatedly advocated for reform of the federal Office of Indian Affairs. He described it as "characterized by inefficiency and fraud," as based on a "falsehood", and criticized political patronage within the system. Whipple had previously conducted a letter campaign over the state of federal Indian affairs, writing to President James Buchanan, Minnesota congress members, Episcopal groups, and more. Lincoln responded to Whipple in early 1862, laying the groundwork for his meeting Whipple in September of that year.

In 1867, Whipple made the following concrete suggestions for reform: perfecting the reservation system, land grants to individuals with "inalienable title, an adequate school system, and a system of inspection of agencies, schools, and employees.

In 1871, the Episcopal Church formed the Indian Commission under its board of missions in response to advocacy from Whipple and William Welsh. Whipple also served on federal commissions that were concerned with Native American welfares, including the Sioux Commission (1876), the Northwest Indian Commission (1887), and the U.S. Board of Indian Commissioners (1895–1901).

=== Dakota War of 1862 ===
His attitude was denounced most bitterly after the Dakota War of 1862, when, in appeals to President Abraham Lincoln and through the press, Whipple opposed wholesale executions and extermination or deportation of the Dakota. Whipple even criticized his distant cousin and former Minnesota governor, Colonel Henry Sibley in such matters.

Whipple was visiting Sibley in St. Paul when news of the August 18 outbreaks of violence reached him. He was then sent to gather men from Faribault to meet at St. Peter, and traveled there to provide aid. Once in St. Peter, Whipple and his wife Cornelia worked to establish a field hospital at the St. Peter town hall, organizing the women into a corps of nurses.

Whipple then traveled to Washington, D.C., and met president Abraham Lincoln at the White House on September 10, 1862. Whipple's cousin was Major General Henry Wager Halleck, Lincoln's commander-in-chief, who requested the meeting. Whipple wished to speak to the president about the conflict that had broken out in Minnesota and to bring Lincoln's attention to the larger conduct of the federal Office of Indian Affairs, which he saw as corrupt. Additionally, Governor Alexander Ramsey encouraged the meeting to secure a regiment of cavalry for Minnesota. Following the meeting, Lincoln said that Whipple's testimony had "shaken him down to his boots."

A military tribunal for the 303 Dakota men began on September 28, 1862. The president decided to review the cases one-by-one. Whipple continued his campaign for reform in Indian affairs, writing Henry Rice and persuading Episcopal bishops to sign onto his call to reform. On December 6, Lincoln granted reprieves to 265 Dakota, approving 38 to be executed citing evidence of murder or rape. The hanging is the single largest execution in American history. Whipple ministered to the hundreds of Dakota who were held at Fort Snelling during the time, as well as speaking after the hangings.

Following the Dakota War, Lincoln proposed reforms to federal Indian policy, recommending a remodel to the system. Recommendations included an end to the treaty process and the tribes' status as independent nations, which were positions Whipple shared. Whipple sent Lincoln reading material and scholar David A. Nichols argues that this is an implication that Lincoln had promised Whipple that the commission had been created. However, reform was dead by the spring of 1863.

== Later episcopate ==
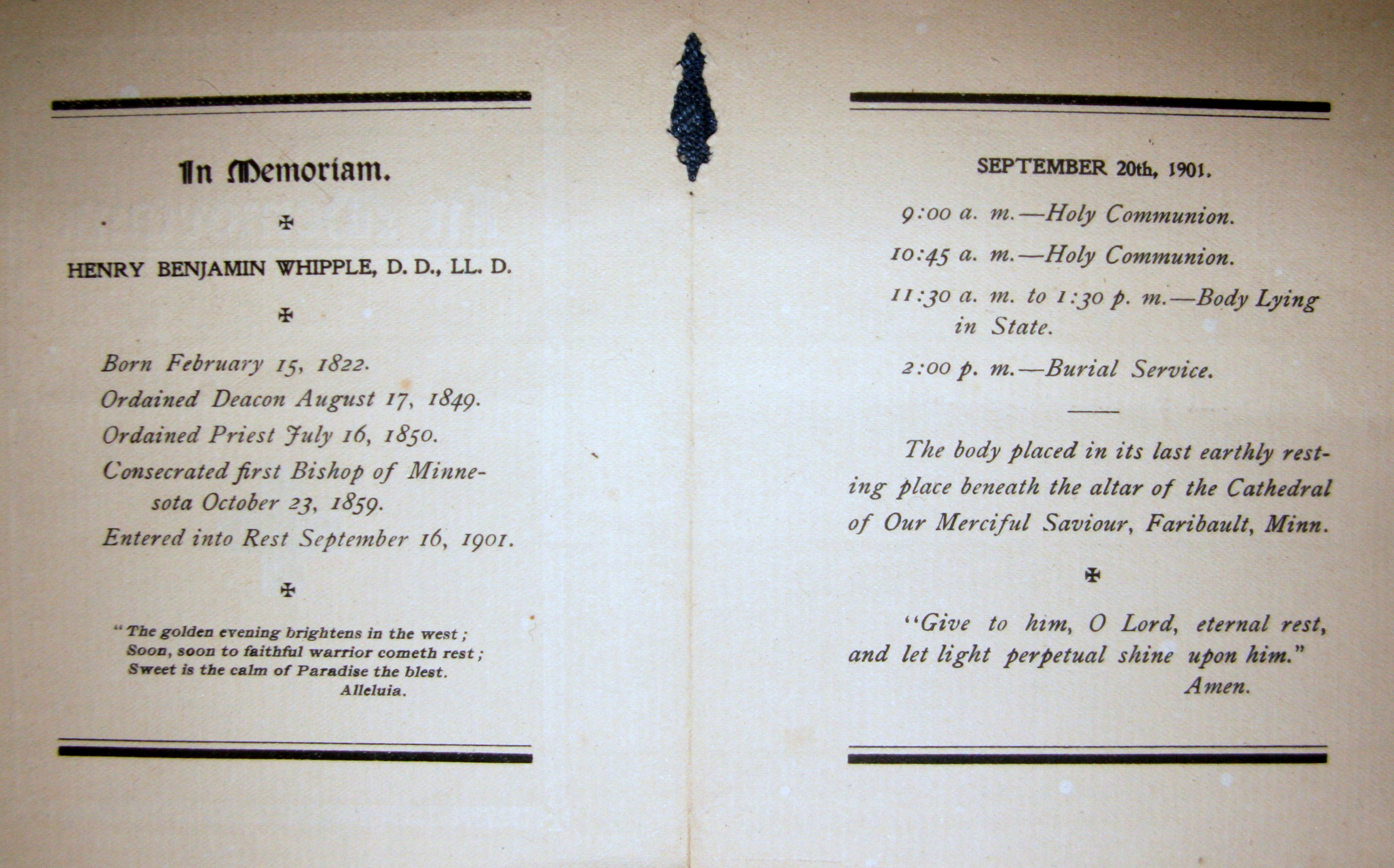
Funeral program for Whipple

Although a high churchman in doctrine, Whipple preached tolerance of all views which fell within the scope of the church's basic teachings. Urging that the church's task was to "preach Christ crucified" and that sectarian quarrels hindered this mission, Whipple pleaded for unity among all branches of the Episcopal and Anglican communions, and for harmonious relations among members of all Christian denominations. Both in Chicago and in Minnesota, Whipple worked closely with ministers and communicants of the national Swedish church. His interest in the church's missionary efforts was reflected in his presidency of the Western Church Building Society (1880–1893), service on several committees and commissions of the General Convention concerned with missionary affairs, and special missions to Cuba and to Puerto Rico.

From the late 1870s until his death, Whipple's health compelled him to spend the winter months each year at his winter home in Maitland, Florida, where he held missionary services and in 1880 built the Carpenter Gothic Church of the Good Shepherd on land which he had purchased. The church was consecrated on March 17, 1883, and Whipple conducted regular services there each winter for the rest of his life.

Henry B. Whipple died on September 16, 1901, having survived his coadjutor Mahlon Norris Gilbert. He is buried beneath the altar of the Cathedral of Our Merciful Saviour in Faribault, Minnesota.

== Theology ==
Whipple was a high church Episcopalian. However, he thought party distinctions were unimportant compared to the duty of preaching.

Whipple was ecumenical and comfortable working with representatives of other denominations, including Swedish clergymen in Chicago.

== Family ==
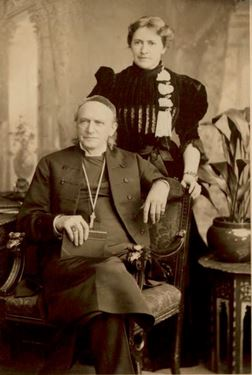
Henry and Evangeline Whipple

Whipple married Cornelia Wright, daughter of Benjamin and Sarah Wright of Adams, New York in 1842. They had six children. Cornelia Whipple died in 1890 from injuries suffered in a railroad accident. In 1896 Whipple married Evangeline Marrs Simpson, widow of industrialist Michael Hodge Simpson.

His son John Hall Whipple was mysteriously killed in 1878. An anonymous writer confessed to the murder, alleging that he killed the bishop's son to avenge a wrong.

Another son, Charles H. Whipple, served as Paymaster-General of the United States Army

State senator David Wager (1804–1870) was his uncle; and United States Army General Henry Halleck (1815–1872) was his first cousin. He was related to captain John Whipple, early settler of Providence, Rhode Island.

== Honors ==
Whipple was elected a member of the American Antiquarian Society in 1894.

He was elected as the first president of the Florida Audubon Society (FAS) in 1900, a year before his death.

== Legacy ==
Whipple is the namesake for the Bishop Whipple Federal Building in Fort Snelling, Minnesota, built in 1965. The building became a site of protests against U.S. Immigration and Customs Enforcement during Operation Metro Surge in 2026.

Bishop Whipple Hall at Concordia College in Moorhead, Minnesota, is a building which was originally a prep school built by Episcopalians but which was purchased by Norwegian Lutherans in 1891 as the main building of their newly founded Concordia College.

The main boy's dormitory at Shattuck is called Whipple Hall.
