= Brian Prior =

American prelate

The Right Reverend Brian Prior
- IX Bishop of Minnesota
- Church: Episcopal Church
- Diocese: Minnesota
- Elected: October 31, 2009
- In office: 2010–2020
- Predecessor: James L. Jelinek
- Successor: Craig Loya
- Other post: Vice President of the House of Deputies (2006-2010) Assisting Bishop in the Diocese of Olympia (2020-2021) Assisting Bishop in the Diocese of Alabama (2021-2025)

Orders
- Ordination: 1989
- Consecration: February 13, 2010 by Katharine Jefferts Schori

Personal details
- Born: October 16, 1959 (age 66) Prosser, Washington, United States
- Denomination: Episcopal
- Spouse: Staci Hubbard
- Children: 2
- Education: Whitworth University

Brian Norman Prior (born October 16, 1959) is an American prelate of the Episcopal Church. He served as the ninth Bishop of Minnesota and later served as an assisting bishop in the Diocese of Olympia and the Diocese of Alabama.

== Education ==
Prior was raised in Prosser, Washington and graduated from Whitworth University in Spokane. In 1987, he received his Master of Divinity from Church Divinity School of the Pacific in Berkeley, California. He received an Honorary Doctorate Degree from Church Divinity School of the Pacific in October 2014.

== Life ==
Prior in 2019

Prior's first position was associate priest of St. Stephen's Episcopal Church in Spokane. From there he worked as the director of education and development for the Diocese of Spokane and also was executive director of Camp Cross, a church-run camp on the shores of Lake Coeur d'Alene.

Prior founded the Episcopal Church of the Resurrection in Spokane, WA in 1996 and served as their rector for 14 years.

In 2003 he was chosen to serve as the chaplain of the Episcopal Church's general convention. In 2006 he was elected vice president of the House of Deputies, one of the two groups that make up the governing body of the Episcopal Church. He was reelected to that position in 2009, but gave up that post to join the House of Bishops.

A month after his consecration as Minnesota's bishop, Prior helped lead the Freeman High School Scotties girl's varsity basketball team to their first state championship. Freeman is a K-12 grade school in Rockford, near Spokane, with fewer than 1,000 students. Prior coached the team for about six years.

Prior has been married to Staci Hubbard Prior for more than 35 years. Prior and his wife met and were married at camp.

Prior and his sons are involved in the Episcopal Conference Programs held at Kanuga Conference Center in Hendersonville, North Carolina.

== Episcopacy ==
Brian Prior was elected IX Bishop of Minnesota at Diocesan Convention on Saturday, October 31, 2009 to succeed James L. Jelinek. He was consecrated on February 13, 2010, the feast of Absalom Jones. He served as vice chair of the Church Pension Fund Board of Trustees.

In Minnesota, the Bishop also served as Board Chair of Shattuck-St. Mary's School and Board Chair of Breck School.

On September 25, 2018, Bishop Prior announced that he would be leaving the position. He was succeeded by Craig Loya on June 6, 2020.

Later in 2020 he began serving as assisting bishop in the Diocese of Olympia.

From January 2022 through December 2025, he served as assisting bishop in the Diocese of Alabama. In addition to making pastoral visitation and providing leadership development, he guided the process of planning for the future of the diocese.

== See also ==
- List of Episcopal bishops of the United States
- Historical list of the Episcopal bishops of the United States

== Footnotes ==
Preceded by James L. Jelinek	Bishop of Minnesota; 2010-2020	Succeeded by Craig Loya
