= Samuel Cook Edsall =

American lawyer

The Right Reverend Samuel Cook Edsall D.D.
- Bishop of Minnesota
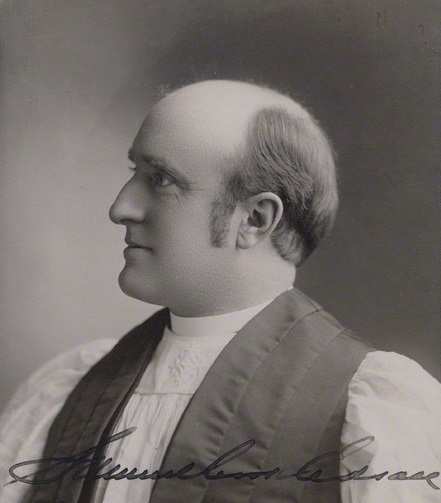
- 1899 photo of Samuel Cook Edsall with his signature
- Church: Episcopal Church
- Diocese: Minnesota
- Elected: June 6, 1901
- In office: 1901–1917
- Predecessor: Henry Benjamin Whipple
- Successor: Frank Arthur McElwain
- Previous post: Bishop of North Dakota (1899-1901)

Orders
- Ordination: June 2, 1889 by William Edward McLaren
- Consecration: January 25, 1899 by William Edward McLaren

Personal details
- Born: February 15, 1860 Dixon, Illinois, United States
- Died: February 17, 1917 (aged 57) Rochester, Minnesota, United States
- Buried: Oakwood Cemetery, Dixon
- Denomination: Anglican
- Parents: James K. Edsall & Caroline Florella More
- Spouse: Grace Harmon (m. 1883)
- Education: Racine College

Samuel Cook Edsall (February 15, 1860 – February 17, 1917) was a bishop of North Dakota and Minnesota in The Episcopal Church.

== Biography ==
The son of James K. Edsall, Illinois Attorney General, and Caroline Florella More, Edsall graduated from Racine College, and after admission to the bar in 1882, initially followed his father's career, practicing law in Chicago.

However, Edsall became increasingly drawn to spiritual matters. He attended Western Theological Seminary, was ordained deacon on December 23, 1888, and priest on June 2, 1889, by Bishop William Edward McLaren. He served as rector of St. Peter's church in Chicago for a decade.

The 1898 General Convention chose Edsall as the Missionary Bishop of North Dakota and he was consecrated in Chicago on January 25, 1899.

On June 6, 1901, he was elected Coadjutor Bishop of Minnesota, and upon the death of bishop Henry Whipple, he succeeded as diocesan. He was installed on October 3, 1901. He then moved to Minneapolis and made it the new headquarters of the Diocese of Minnesota. He served 16 years, dying in office and succeeded by his suffragan, Frank McElwain.

== References and external links ==
- New York Times reports his election as bishop
- New York Times obituary
