= St. Mark's Episcopal Cathedral (Minneapolis) =

Cathedral in Minneapolis, Minnesota

Coordinates: 44°58′05″N 93°17′14″W

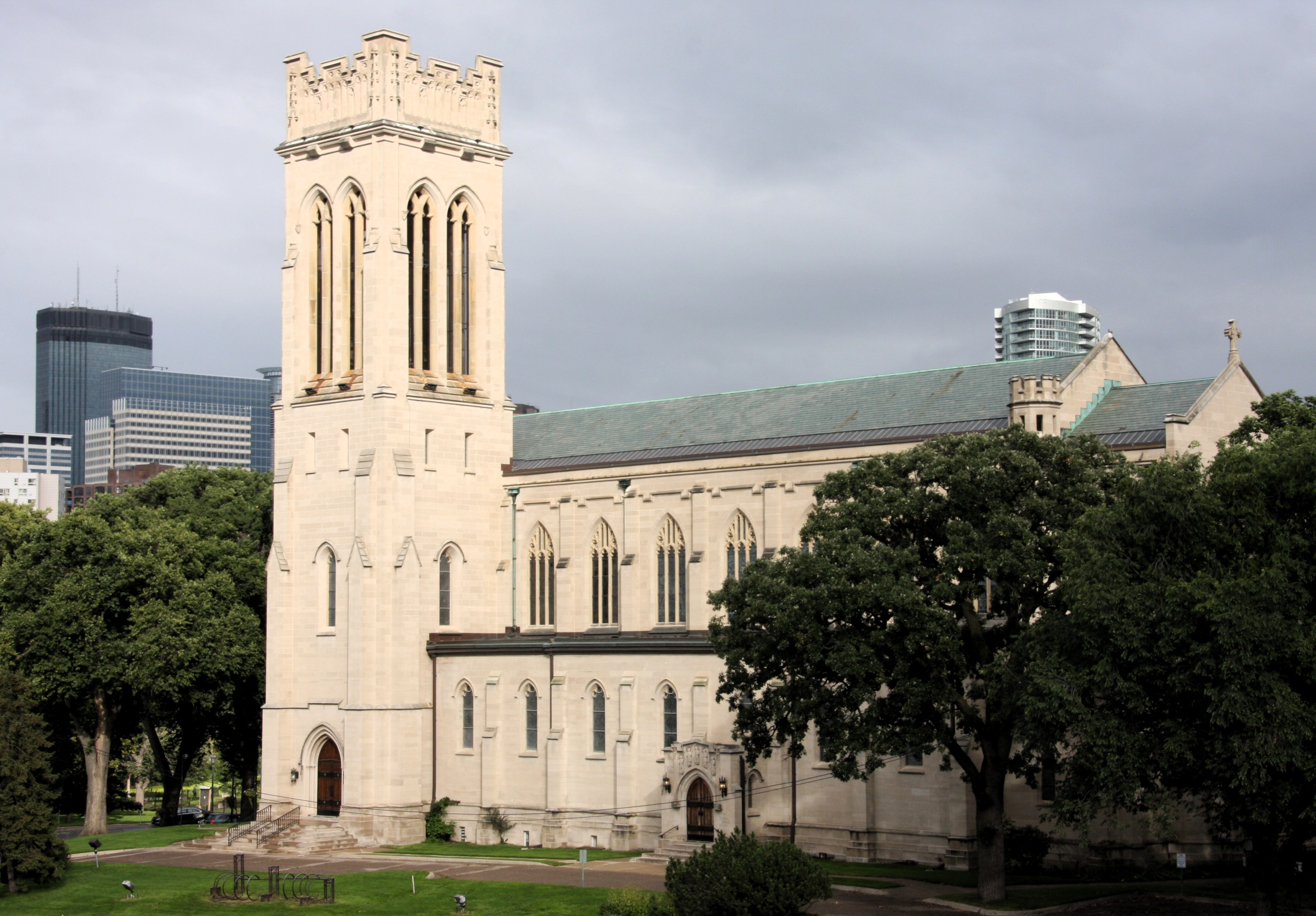
St. Mark's Cathedral in Minneapolis

Saint Mark's Episcopal Cathedral in Minneapolis is one of two cathedrals in the Episcopal Church in Minnesota. The church was founded in 1858 and designated as a cathedral in 1941. Its current building dates from 1910. In 2025, it reported 738 members, 264 average Sunday attendance (ASA), and $1,138,506 in plate and pledge financial support. This was a relative decrease from ASA of 483 persons reported in 2019.

== History ==
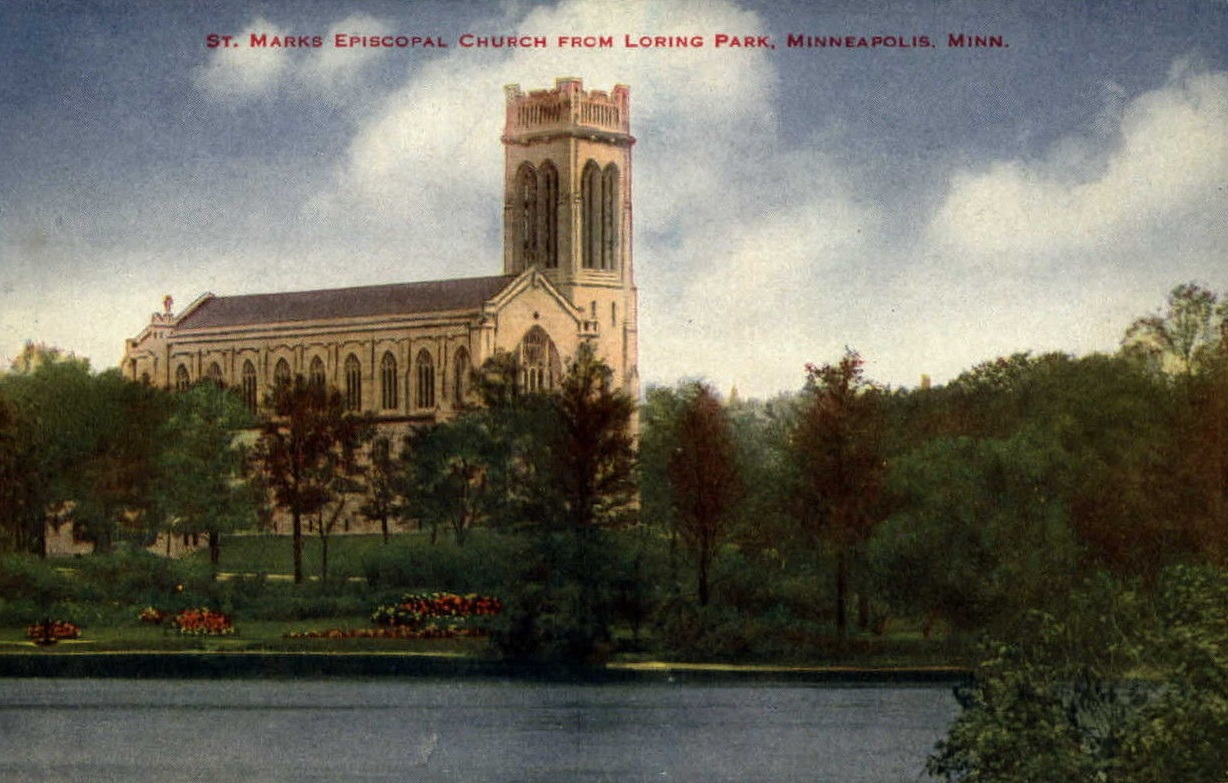
1907 postcard showing St. Mark’s

St. Mark’s Church was founded in 1858 as a mission of Gethsemane in downtown Minneapolis. It was first located in North Minneapolis at Washington Avenue and 27th Avenue North. In 1863 the original building was moved to the city center (4th Street and Hennepin Avenue) on a sled pulled by oxen. It was incorporated as a parish on June 19, 1868, and occupied a new building on 6th Street between Hennepin and Nicollet Avenues from 1870 to 1908. Today's St. Mark's, designed by architect Edwin Hawley Hewitt (who was a parishioner), was built in 1910 on Hennepin Avenue overlooking Loring Park. The cornerstone was laid on November 15, 1908, and the Parish House was built first, with enough space to serve for worship while the actual church structure was being erected next to it. By the late 1930s, Bishop Samuel Cook Edsall had moved his residence to Minneapolis from the Cathedral of Our Merciful Saviour in Faribault, and had begun referring to St. Mark's as a "Pro-Cathedral". St. Mark's was officially designated the diocesan cathedral in 1941; the Cathedral of Our Merciful Saviour retained its cathedral status as "the historic cathedral".

== Ministry and outreach ==
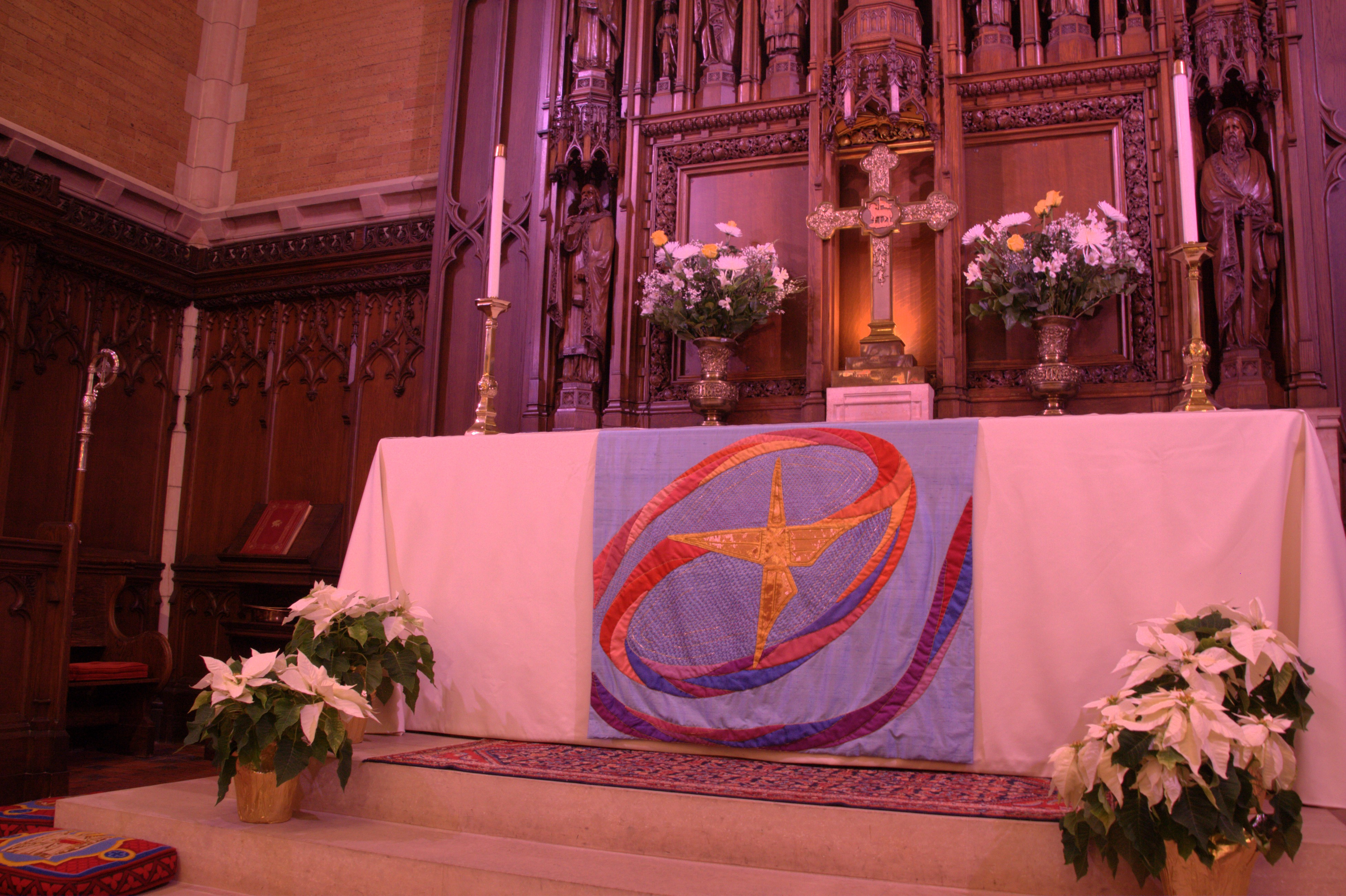
The main altar at the cathedral

St. Mark’s Cathedral is a partner of the Community of the Cross of Nails, based at Coventry Cathedral in England, a global organization committed "to work[ing] and pray[ing] for peace, justice and reconciliation".

St. Mark's has been an active presence in the community, hosting numerous ecumenical and interfaith services. Among these have been an interfaith service of healing following the collapse of the Interstate 35W bridge in Minneapolis and a memorial service for the victims of an April 23, 2005, shooting rampage at the Red Lake Indian Reservation in northern Minnesota The cathedral also offers an afternoon service each year on the final day of the Twin Cities Pride Fest, held across the street in Loring Park.

Outreach ministries to the community include Sunday Night Supper, Monday Night Supper, Warm Space, and Sandwich Ministry.

Outreach abroad has included participation in several mission trips to Cuba as part of groups from the Episcopal Church in Minnesota.

The Cathedral Book Shop carries an assortment of religious and select secular books and gifts.

== Music at St. Mark's ==
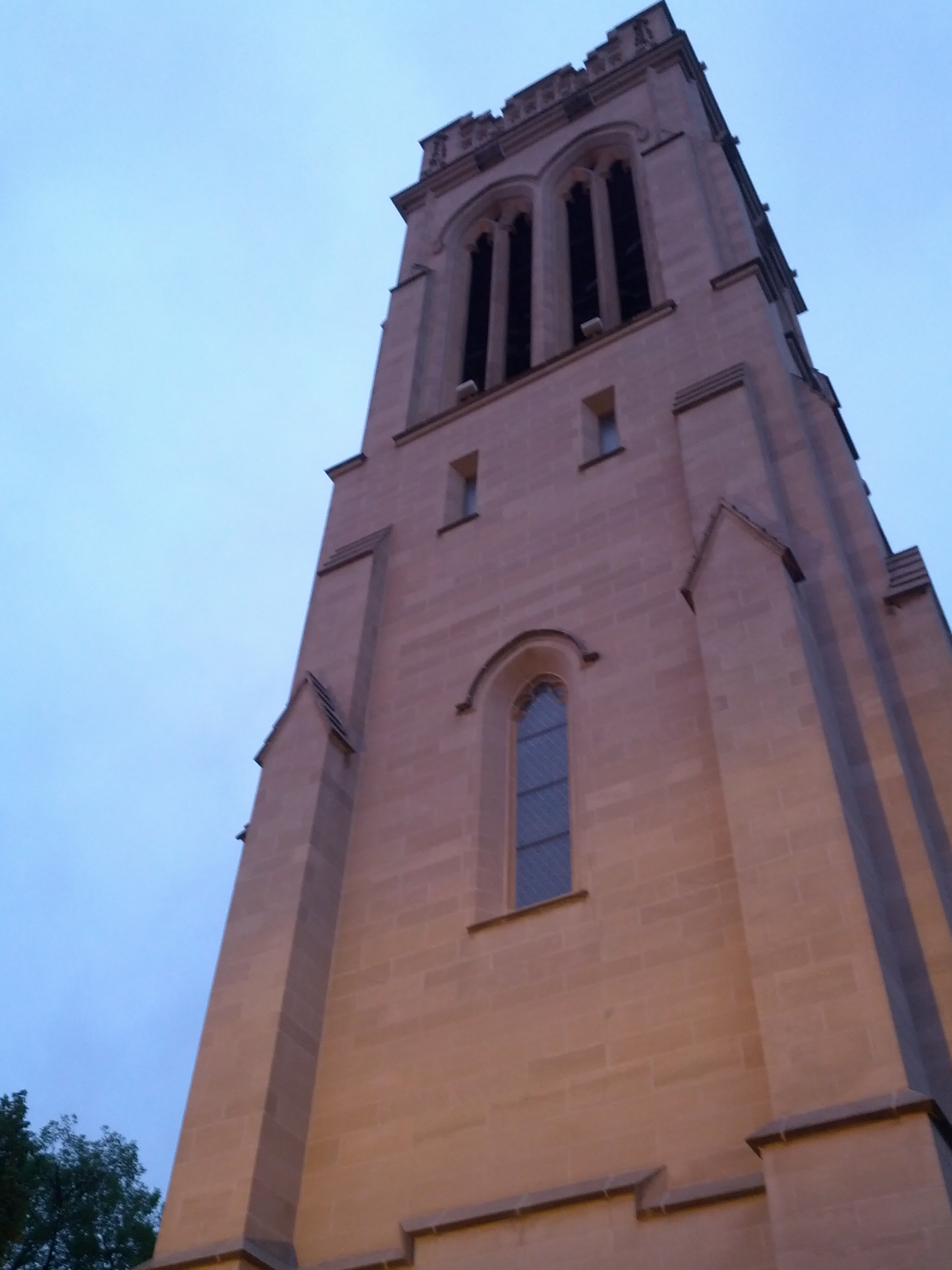
Bell tower at St. Mark's

Music is a vital part of worship at St. Mark's, as well as an outreach ministry to the wider community. Resident choral groups include the Choir Cathedral Choir, the Cathedral Choristers, and the Small Singers. The Cathedral Choral Society draws singers from St. Mark's as well as the wider community. St. Mark's pipe organ had a major rebuild in 2012. The St. Mark's Music Series offers a variety of concerts and recitals featuring music from the Cathedral Choir and Choral Society, Canon Musician Raymond Johnston, and other artists and performing groups.

== General Conventions ==
Three General Conventions of the Episcopal Church have been held in Minnesota.

Some events of the 1895 General Convention (headquartered at The Church of Gethsemane and the first General Convention west of Chicago) were held at St. Mark’s downtown Minneapolis building.

General Convention met in Minneapolis next in 1976, again, with some events at St. Mark's. That General Convention officially accepted the ordination of women as priests and adopted the current Book of Common Prayer used in the United States.

St. Mark's once more hosted some events at the 2003 General Convention in Minneapolis, at which the election of the Rev. V. Gene Robinson as Bishop of the Diocese of New Hampshire was confirmed, making him the Episcopal Church's first openly gay, noncelibate bishop.

== World Congress ==
St. Mark's Cathedral hosted the first World Congress of the Anglican Communion to be held outside of the United Kingdom in 1954. The Compass Rose embedded in the floor at the crossing commemorates that gathering, and it was at the World Congress at St. Mark’s that the Compass Rose was adopted as the symbol of the Anglican Communion.

== Gallery ==
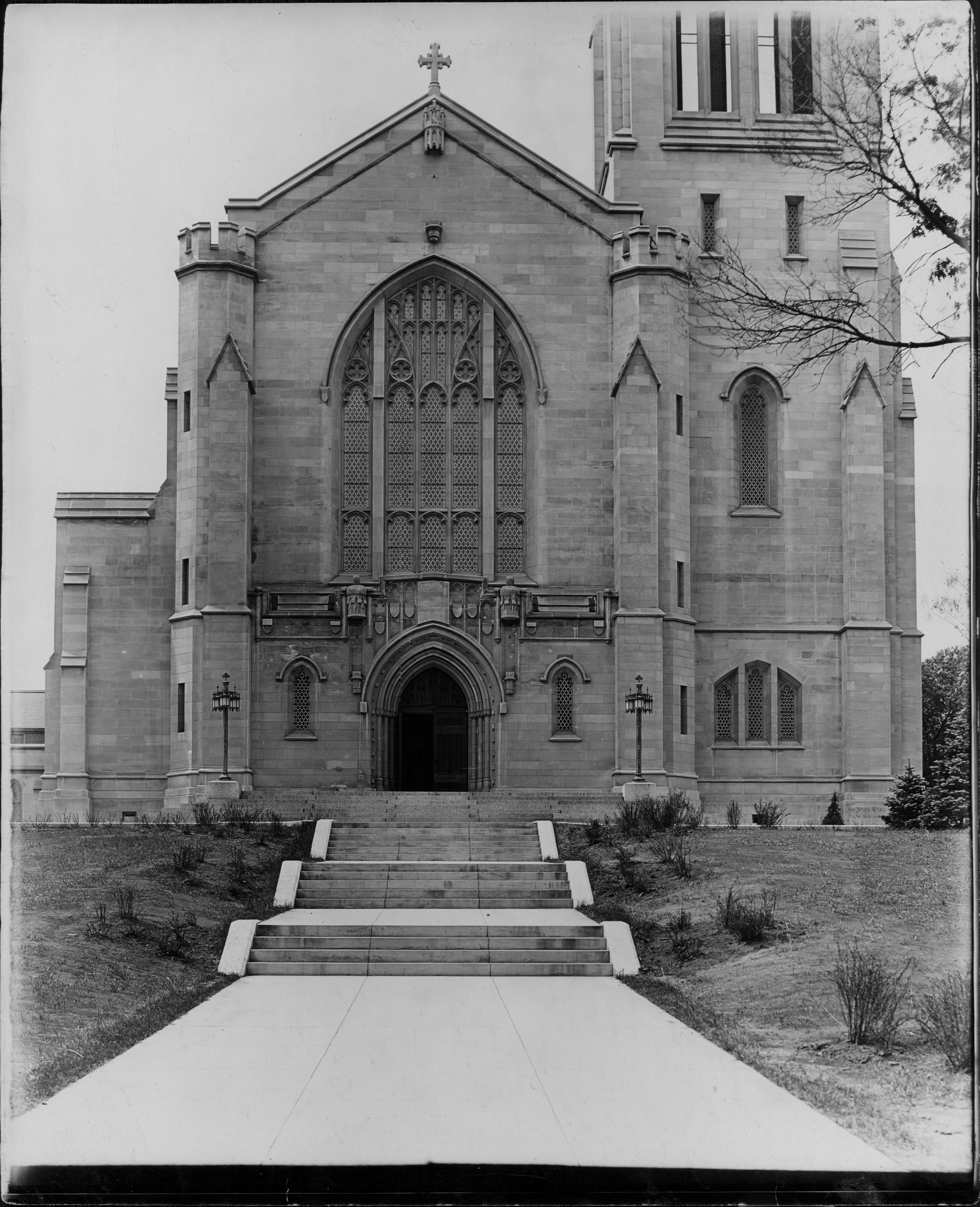
St. Mark's Episcopal Cathedral

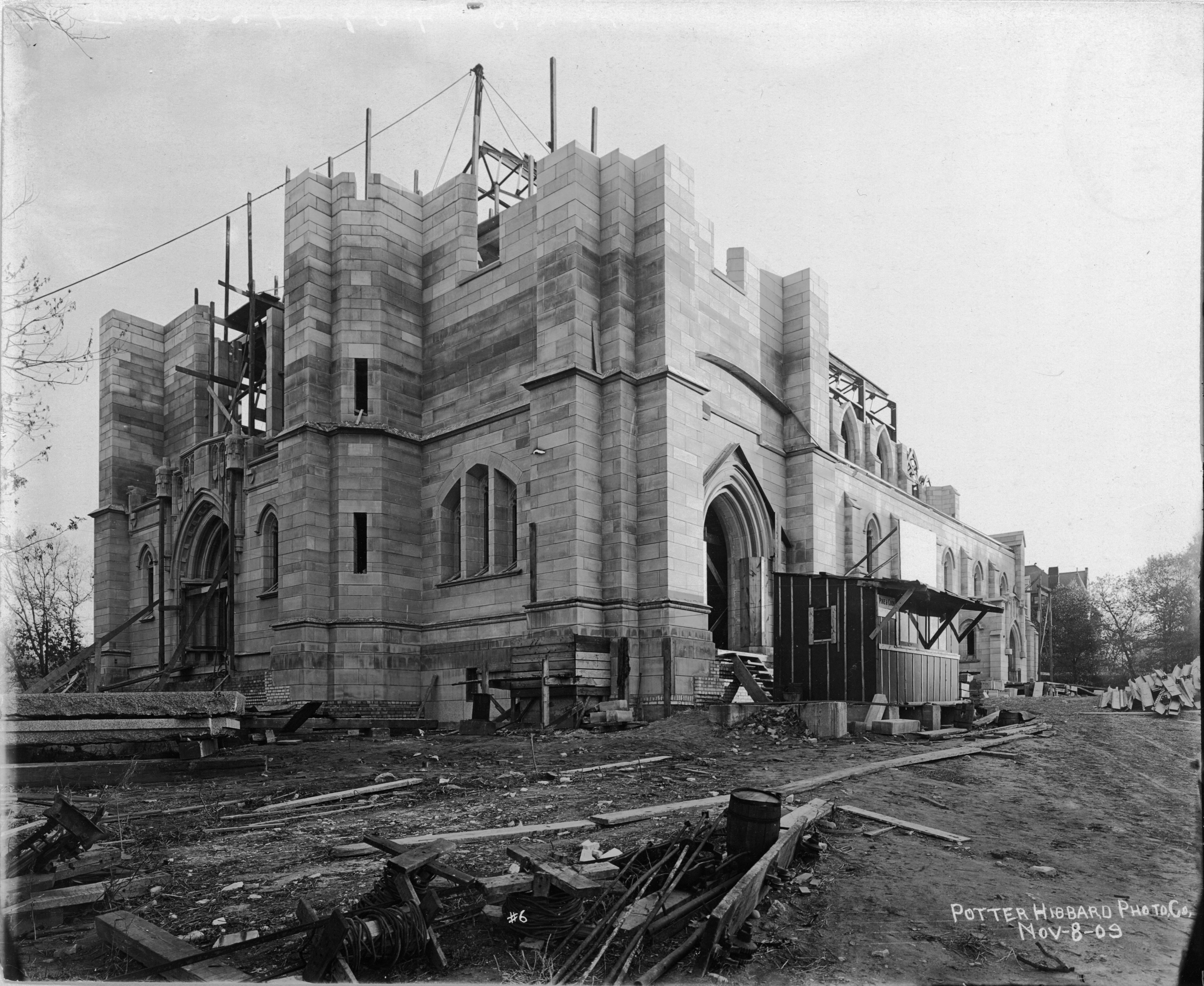
Construction of the Outside Walls of St. Mark's Cathedral

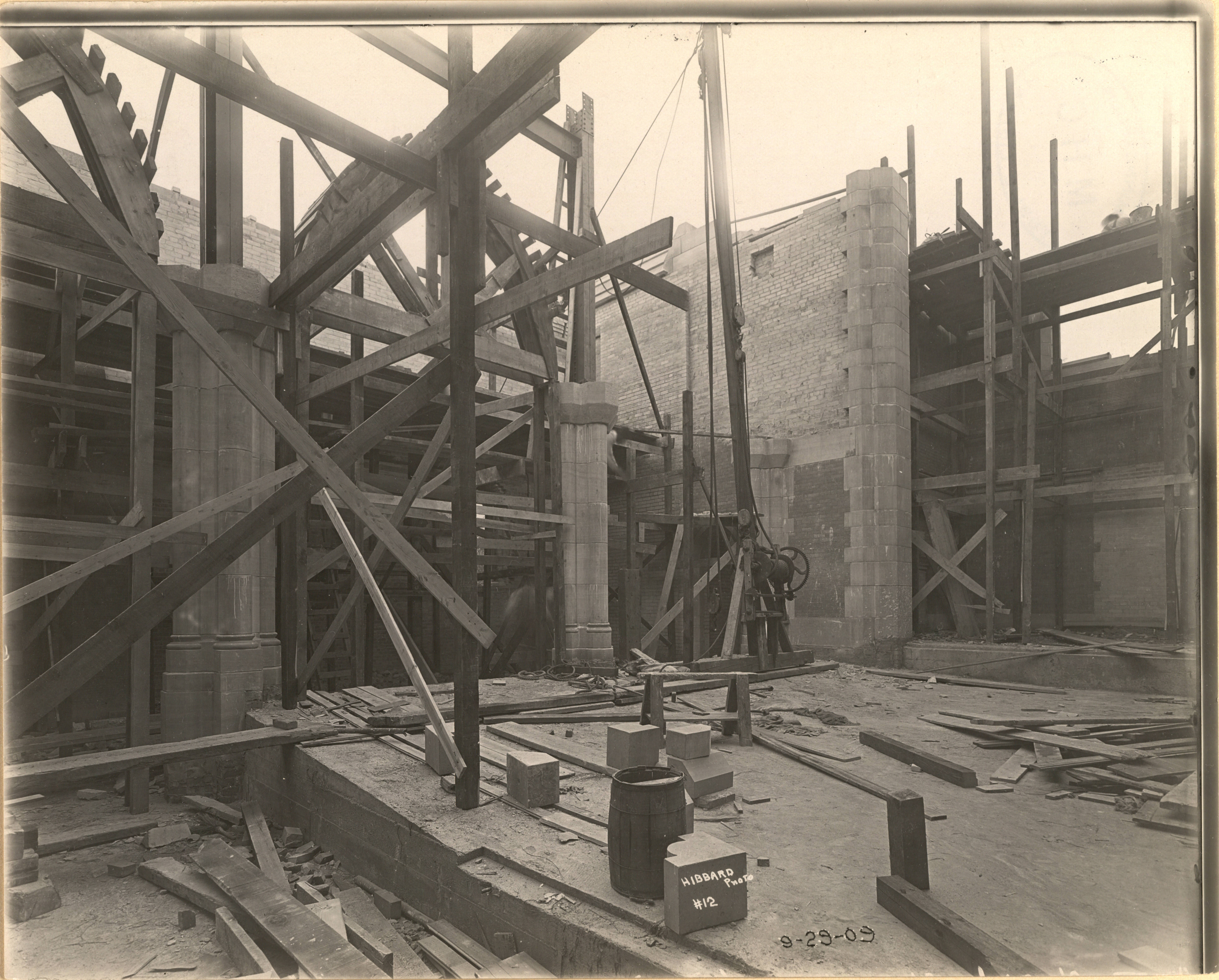
Construction of the Interior Walls of St. Mark's Cathedral

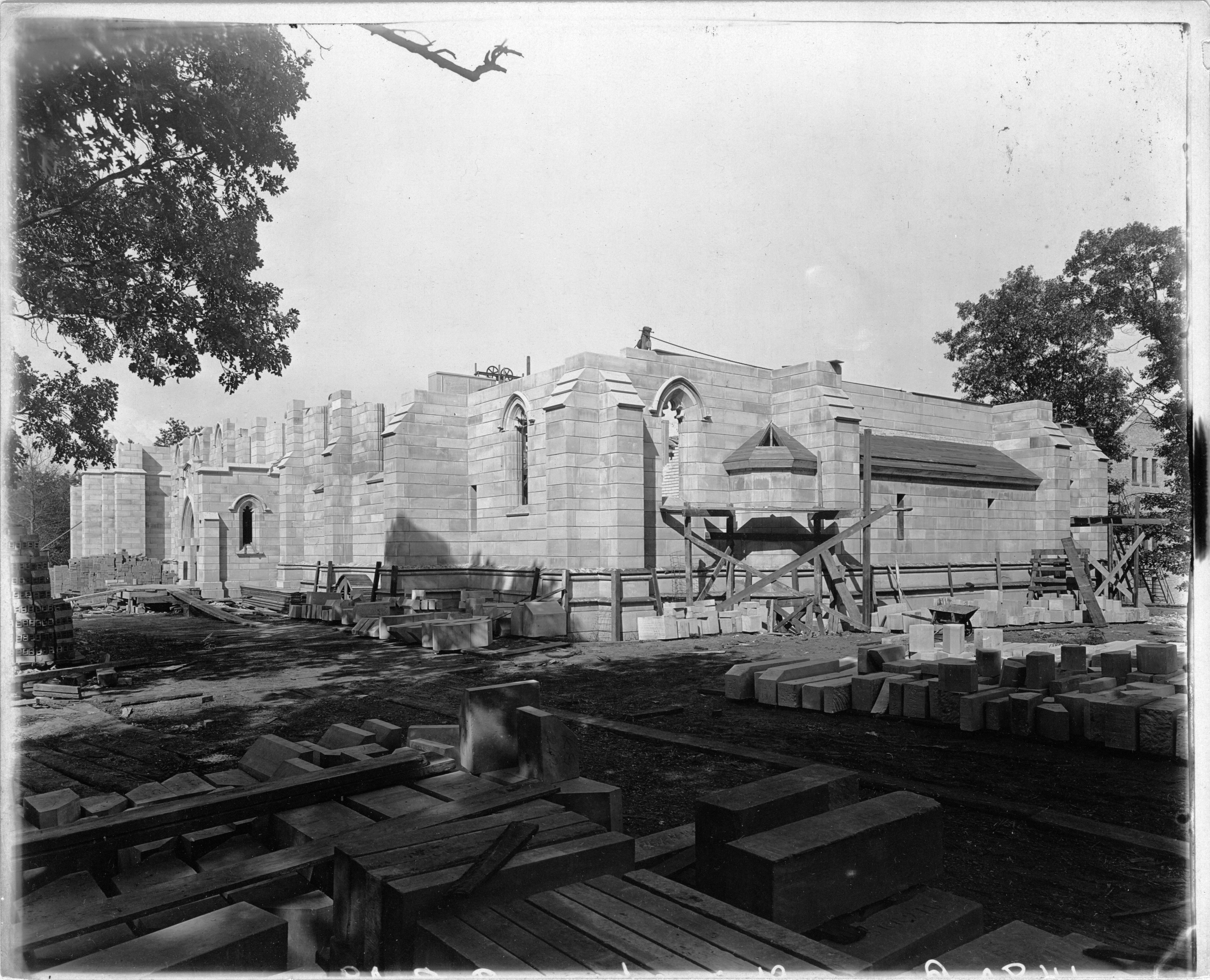
Construction of the Outside Walls of St. Mark's Cathedral

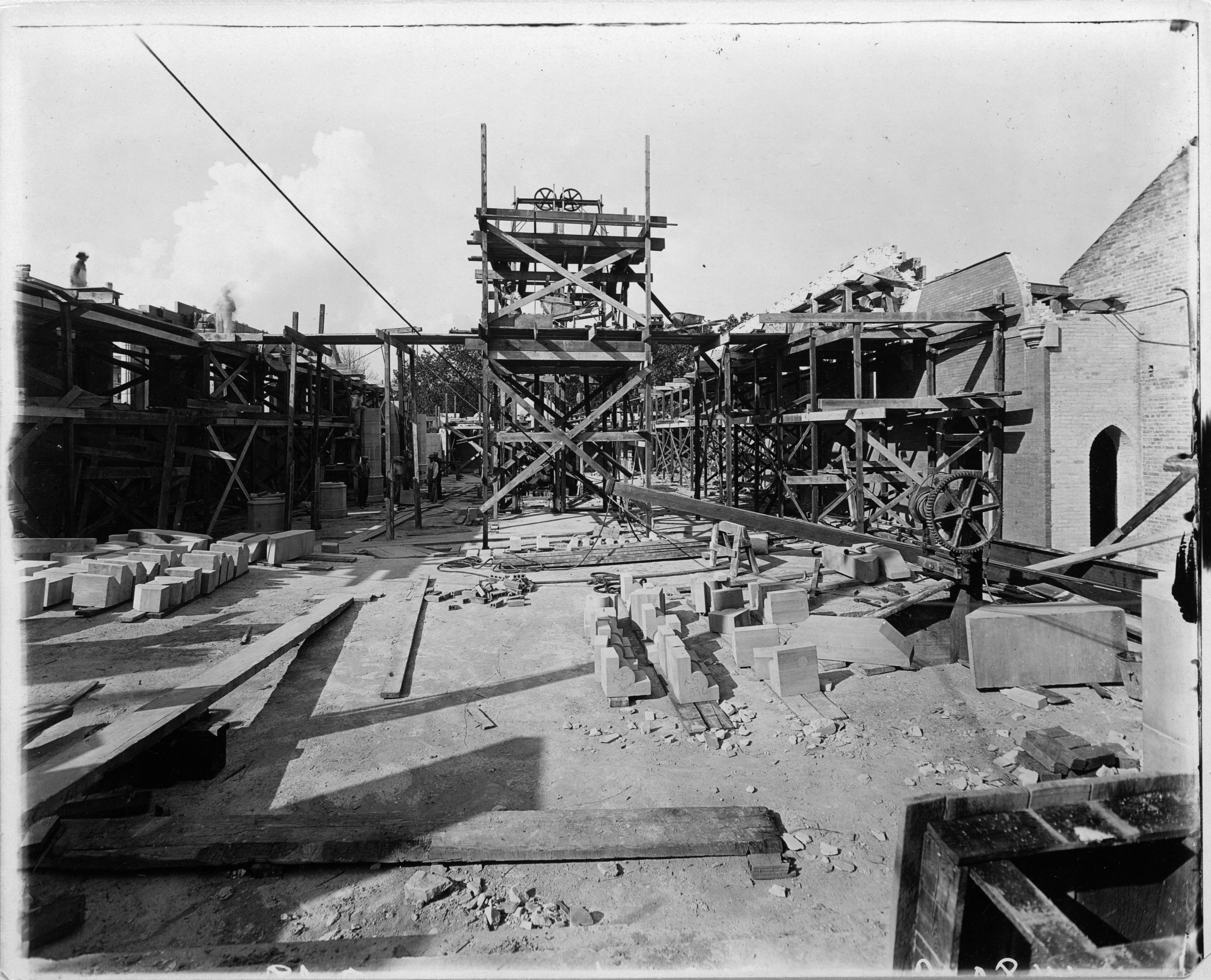
Construction of the Walls and Columns of the Interior of St. Mark's Cathedral

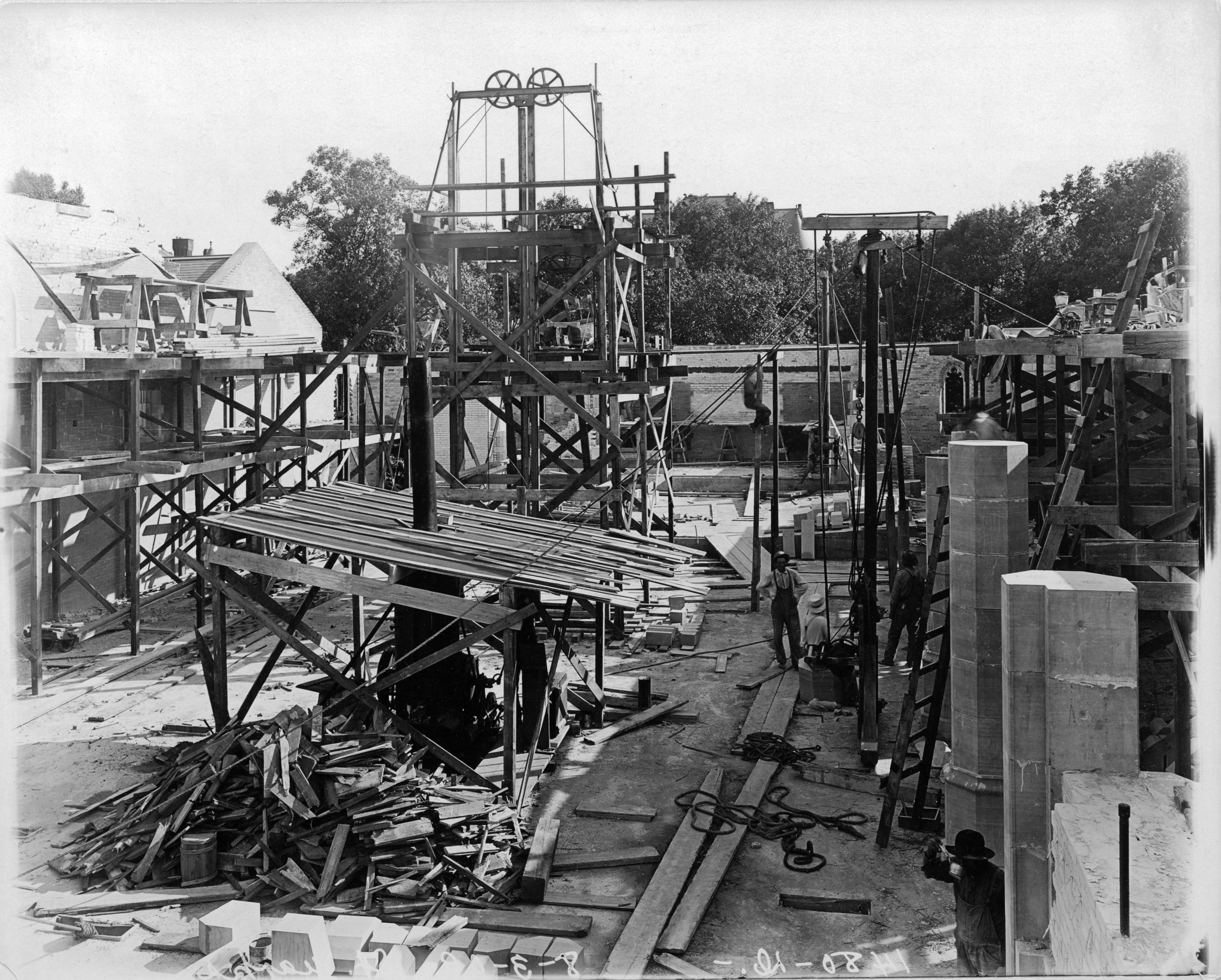
Construction of the Walls and Columns of the Interior of St. Mark's Cathedral

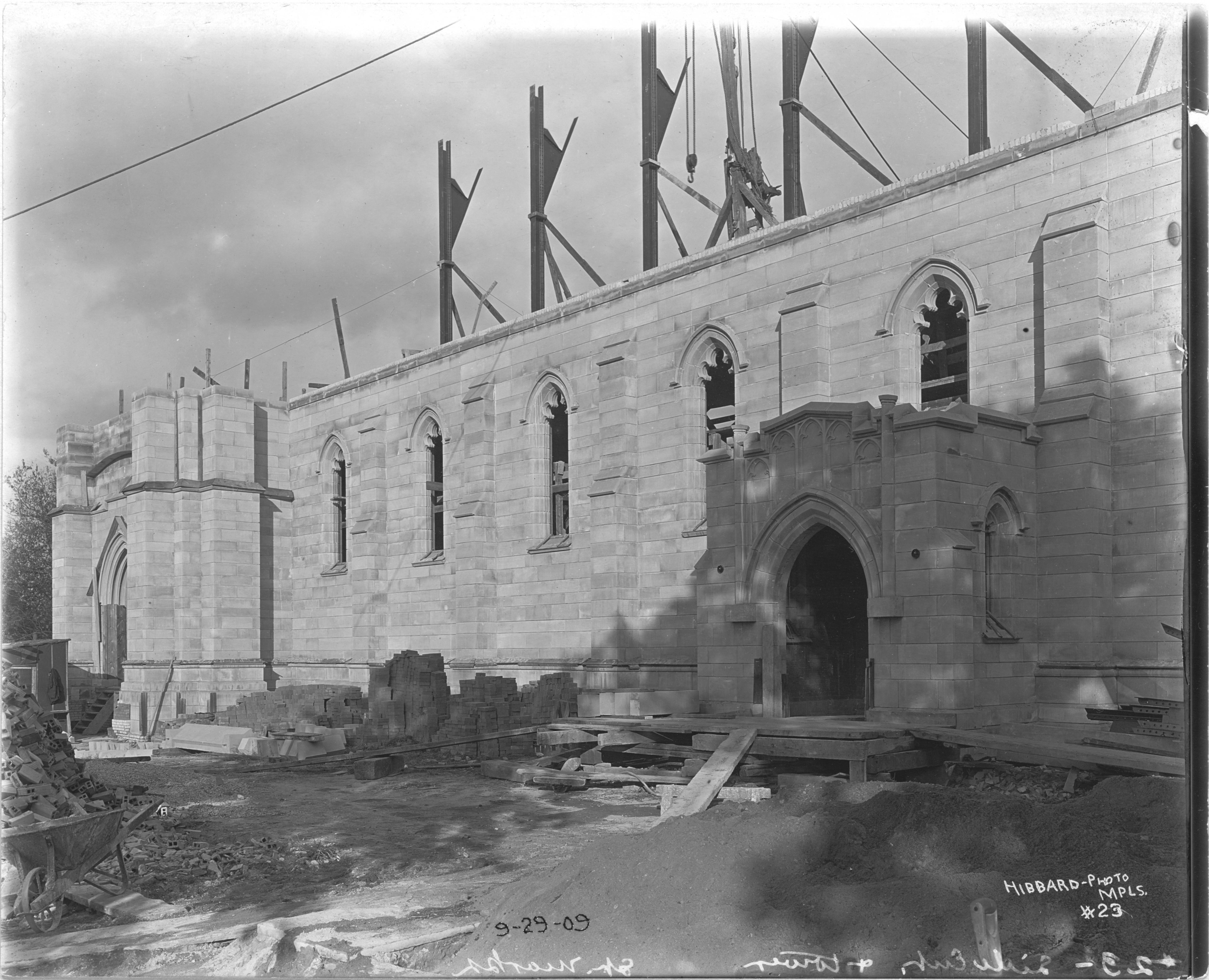
Construction of the West Side of St. Mark's Cathedral

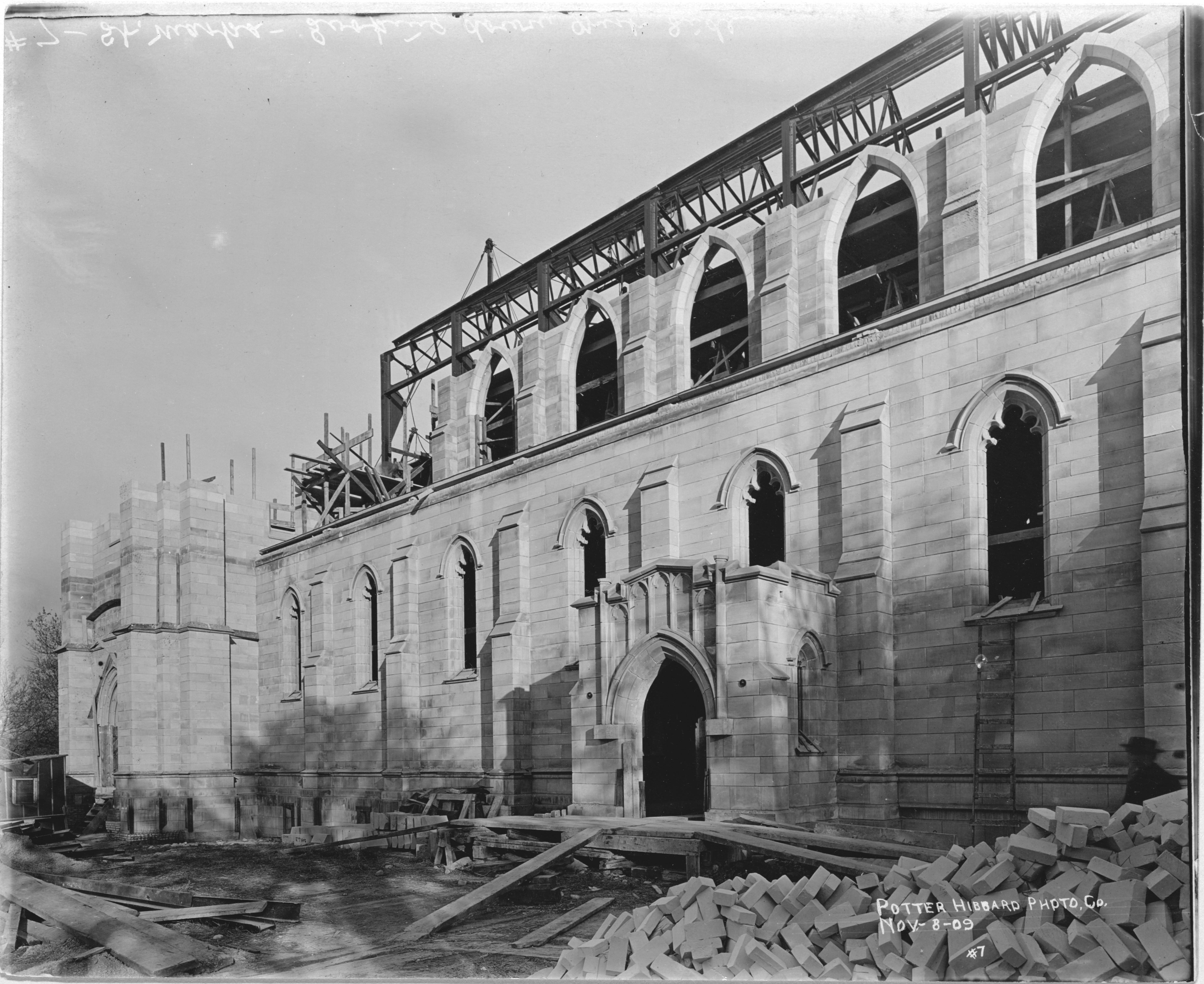
Construction of the West Wall of St. Mark's Cathedral

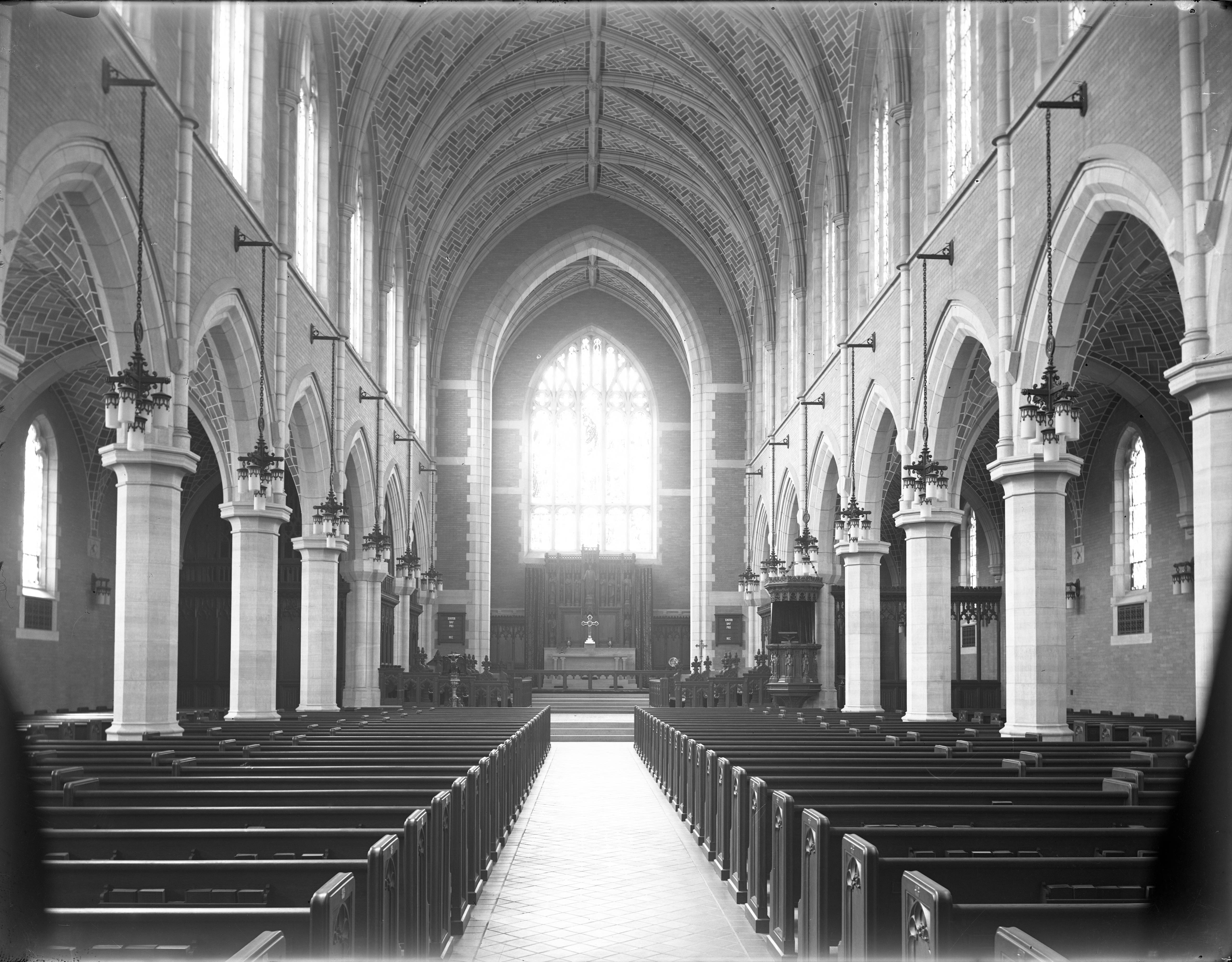
Interior of the Nave of St. Mark's Episcopal Cathedral

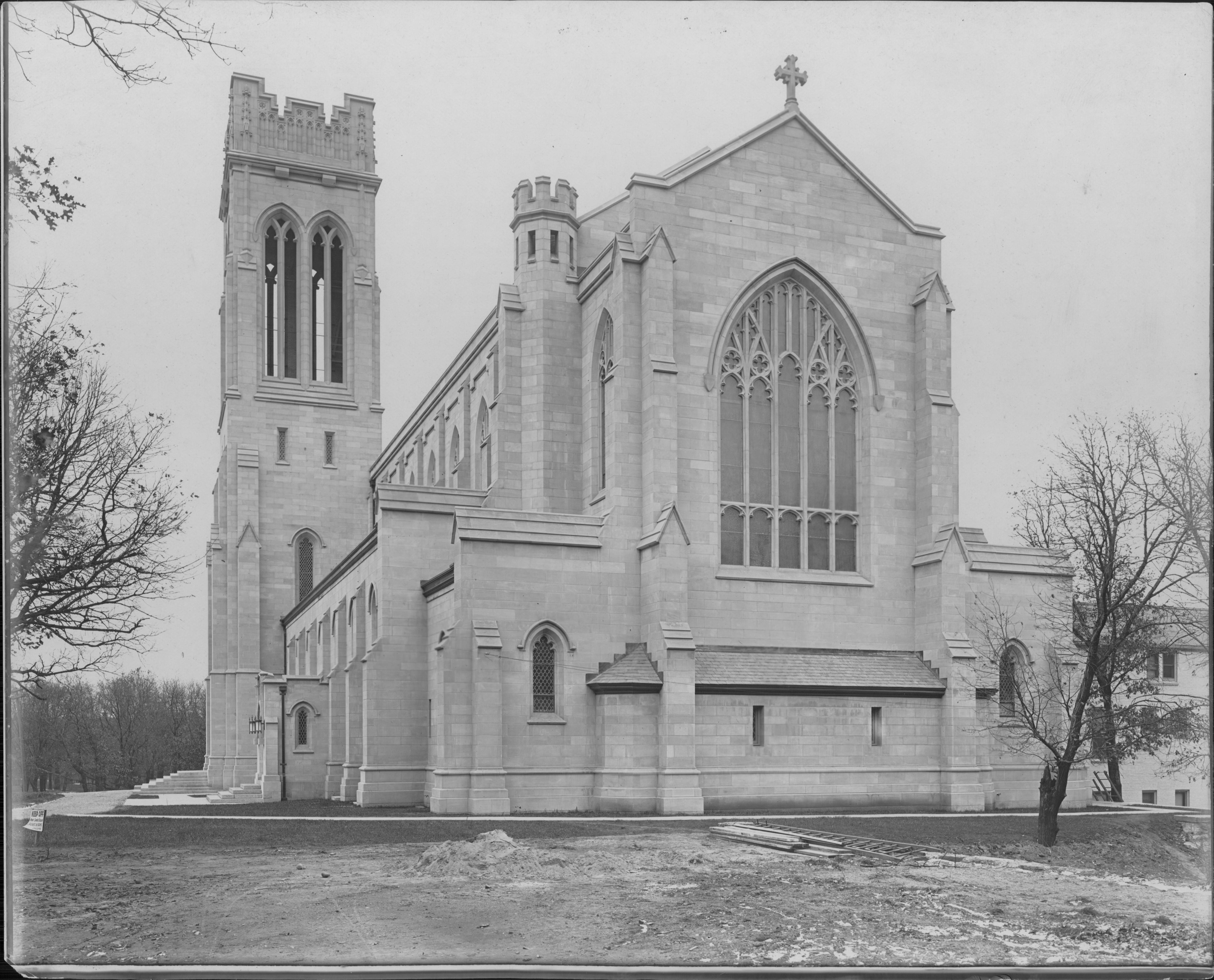
St. Mark's Episcopal Cathedral

== See also ==
- List of the Episcopal cathedrals of the United States
- List of cathedrals in the United States
