= Cathedral of Our Merciful Saviour =

Historic church in Minnesota, United States

- Cathedral of Our Merciful Saviour; Guild House and Bishop's Residence
- U.S. National Register of Historic Places
- The cathedral in 2021
- Location: 515 Second Ave NW
- Nearest city: Faribault, Minnesota
- Coordinates: 44°17′48″N 93°16′15″W
- Built: 1862-1869
- Architect: James Renwick Jr.
- Architectural style: Gothic Revival
- NRHP reference No.: 79001253; 82003009
- Added to NRHP: August 10, 1979; February 19, 1982

The Cathedral of Our Merciful Saviour in Faribault is the oldest cathedral in Minnesota. Built 1862–1869 and designed by James Renwick Jr., it was the first church in the Episcopal Church in the United States of America designed as a cathedral.

The church reported 147 members in 2015 and 62 members in 2025. Plate and pledge income reported for the congregation in 2025 was $67,762 with average Sunday attendance (ASA) of 20 persons. This was a relative decrease from ASA of 59 reported in 2016.

On August 10, 1979, the cathedral and its guild house were added to the National Register of Historic Places. On February 19, 1982, there was a boundary increase to add the bishop's residence to the National Register.

== History ==
Our Merciful Saviour was founded by Bishop Henry Benjamin Whipple, who is buried beneath the altar. Whipple laid the cornerstone on July 16, 1862 and it was dedicated on St. John's Day, June 24, 1869.

Whipple envisioned that the cathedral would be part of an educational community in Faribault, writing, "It was my hope that we might build up schools around the Cathedral, making it a common centre." He was involved with the founding of James Lloyd Breck's Seabury Divinity School as well as Shattuck, St. Mary's, and St. James. Breck also helped fundraise extensively for building the cathedral, raising between $11,000 and $12,000 of the total cost of $60,000.

The Cathedral was built in several stages, with the body of the cathedral ready for service in 1868. The guild house was constructed in 1895 to allow for more space and services, and the Bishop Gilbert wing was built in 1905. The tower was not completed until 1902, and was done so as a memorial to Bishop Whipple, with the chimes in the tower contributed by his second wife, Evangeline Marrs Whipple.

In 1941 St. Mark's Episcopal Cathedral in Minneapolis was dedicated as the seat of the bishop for the Episcopal Diocese of Minnesota, but the Cathedral of Our Merciful Saviour retained its status as a full cathedral.

The cathedral continues to serve the regional community and celebrated its 150th anniversary in 2012. After the COVID-19 pandemic, attendance dwindled, and the church began adding new programming to gather support. Programs include a quilt show, a free meal in the Guild House, meetings by Triumphant Life Church, Alcoholics Anonymous, and Narcotics Anonymous. The cathedral also hosts a concert series.

== Architecture ==
Whipple chose James Renwick, Jr. as the cathedral architect, who also designed St. Patrick's Cathedral in New York, the Smithsonian Institution Building in Washington, D.C., and a very similar church, the Christ Church by the Sea in Colón, Panama.

The church is constructed in a Gothic Revival style, and is built out of native blue limestone from the Fall Creek Quarry east of Faribault, with red-brown limestone used around the windows and doors to create a polychromatic effect. The cathedral takes the form of a Latin Cross, with the nave and chancel forming the length and the tower and organ rooms forming the trancept arms. Other aspects of the Gothic Revival design include the soaring roof, engaged butresses that divide the nave into seven longitudinal bays, and narrow windows with stained glass panels.

The square tower and belfry, completed 1902, was finished in a version of the English Perpendicular style, and features stone mullions, crenelated parapets, and tall finials adorned with crockets at the corners. Corners of the main tower are also defined with engaged buttresses.

Details of the cathedral are largely similar today to when the cathedral was built. Some of those details include exposed timber trusses with small pendants at the center joint of each truss, original detailing, and English gothic motifs including trefoils and quatrefoils are present throughout the building.

The nave seats 600 people.

=== Dimensions ===
The dimensions of the cathedral are as follows:

- Nave: 45ft by 90ft
- Chancel: 35ft by 45ft
- Organ room: 22ft
- Tower: 20ft square

== National Register listings ==
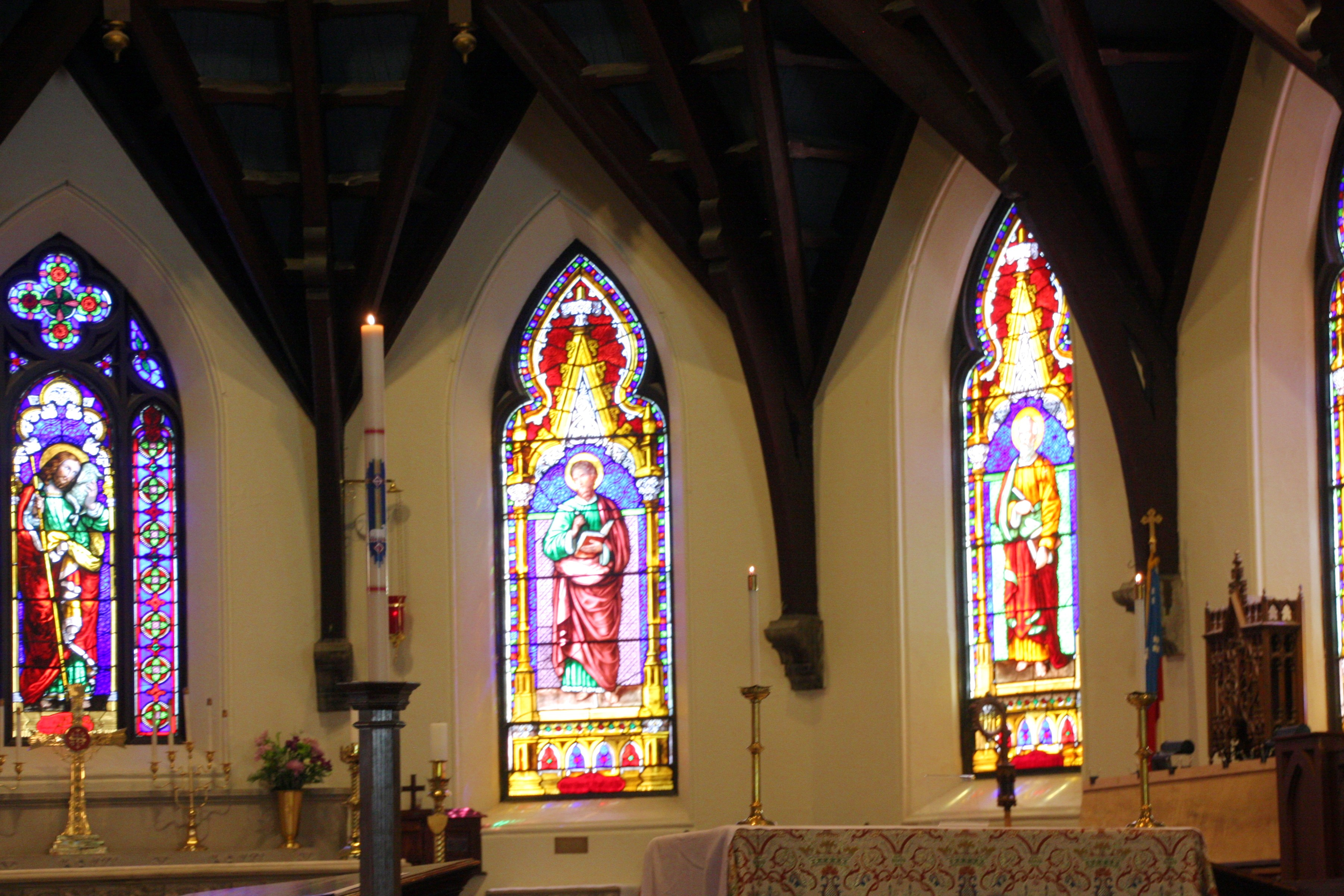
The cathedral altar

=== Original ===
- Cathedral of Our Merciful Saviour **
- (added 1979 - Building - #79001253)
- Also known as See Also: Cathedral of Our Merciful Saviour and Guild House
- 515 2nd Ave., NW, Faribault
- Historic Significance: Event, Architecture/Engineering
- Architect, builder, or engineer: Renwick & Co.
- Architectural Style: Gothic Revival
- Area of Significance: Architecture, Religion
- Period of Significance: 1850-1874
- Owner: Private
- Historic Function: Religion
- Historic Sub-function: Religious Structure
- Current Function: Religion
- Current Sub-function: Religious Structure

=== Boundary increase ===
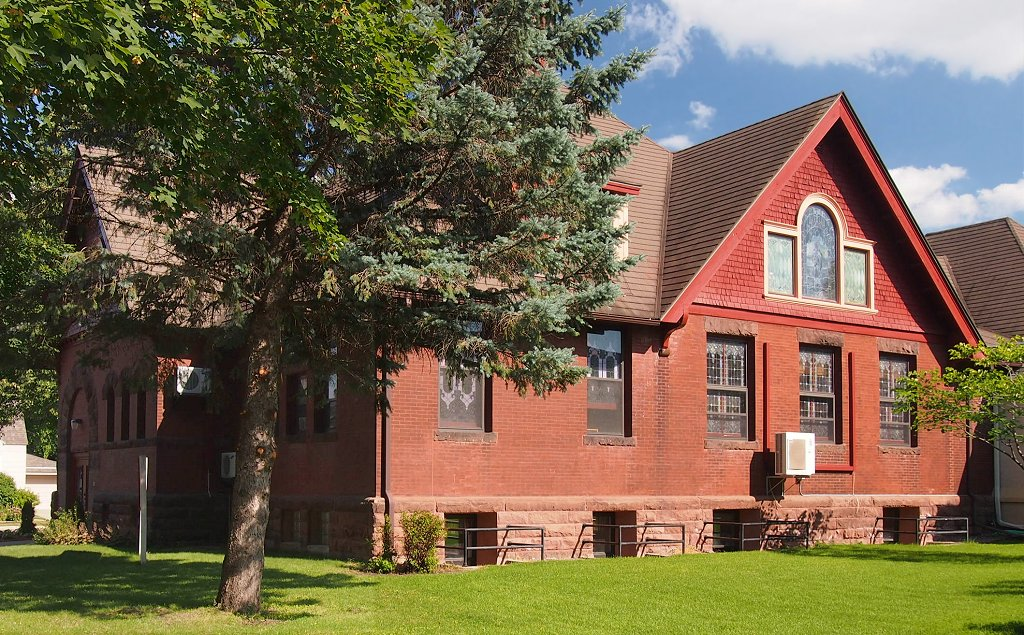
The Guild House from the northwest

- Cathedral of Our Merciful Saviour and Guild House (Boundary Increase) **
- (added 1982 - Building - #82003009)
- Also known as See Also: Cathedral of Our Merciful Saviour
- 515 2nd Ave., NW, Faribault
- Historic Significance: Person, Event, Architecture/Engineering
- Architect, builder, or engineer: Unknown
- Architectural Style: Late Victorian
- Historic Person: Whipple, Bishop Henry Benjamin
- Significant Year: 1894
- Area of Significance: Architecture, Religion
- Period of Significance: 1875-1899
- Owner: Private
- Historic Function: Religion
- Historic Sub-function: Church Related Residence
- Current Function: Religion
- Current Sub-function: Church Related Residence

== See also ==
- List of the Episcopal cathedrals of the United States
- List of cathedrals in the United States
