= Bishop Funsten House =

- U.S. National Register of Historic Places
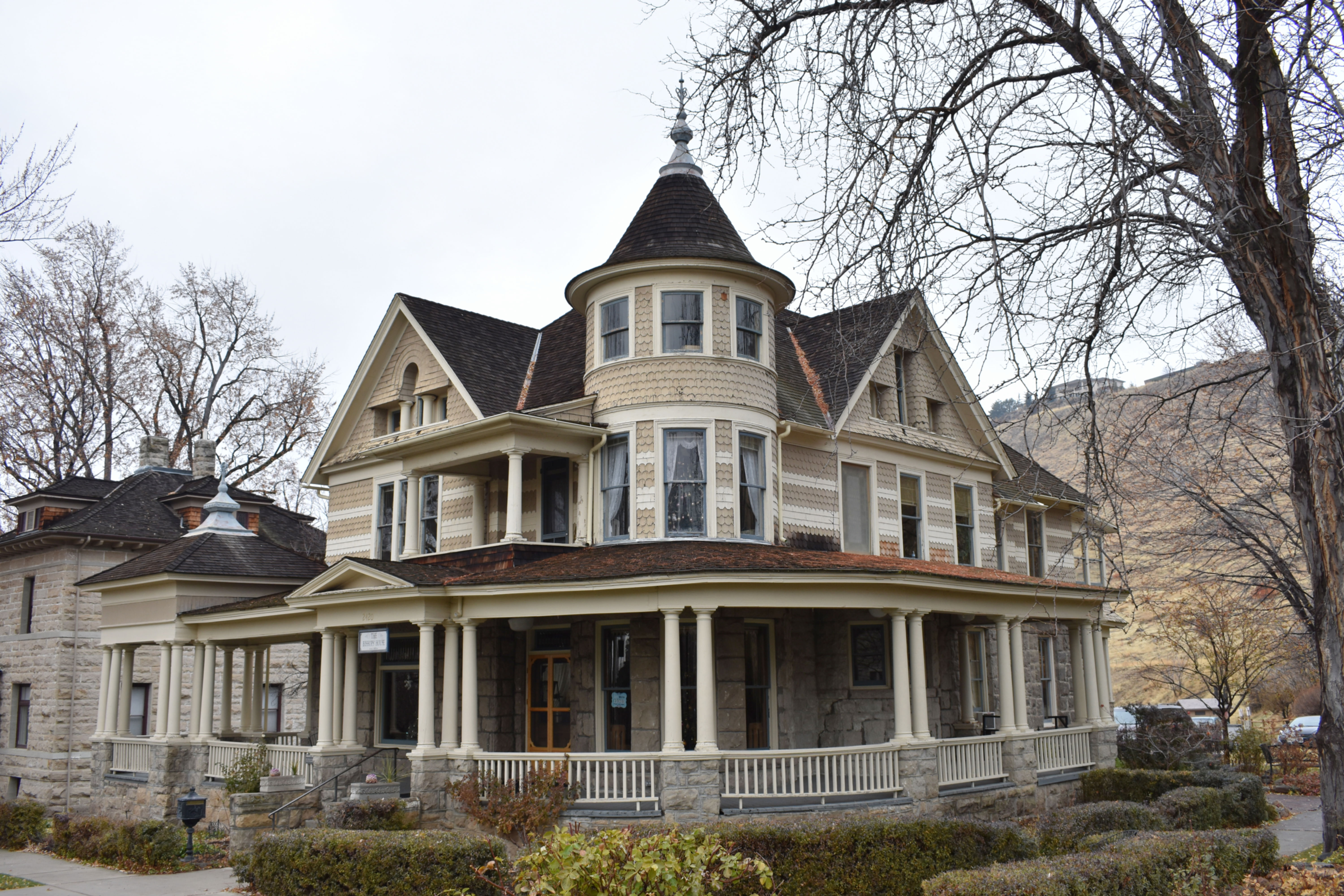
- The Bishops' House (Bishop Funsten House) in 2018

- Location within Idaho Location within the United States
- Interactive map showing the location of Bishop Funsten House
- Location: 2420 Old Penitentiary Rd., Boise, Idaho
- Coordinates: 43°36′12″N 116°09′42″W
- Area: 2.5 acres (1.0 ha)
- Built: 1889
- Built by: A.G. Lachapelle (original)
- Architect: Tourtellotte, John E. & Company (1900 remodel)
- Architectural style: Queen Anne
- MPS: Tourtellotte and Hummel Architecture TR
- NRHP reference No.: 83000256
- Added to NRHP: January 3, 1983

Bishop Funsten House, also known as The Bishops' House, Old Bishops' House, and Bishop Rhea Center, is a 2 1/2-story Queen Anne style clergy house constructed in 1889 in Boise, Idaho, USA, that served as the rectory for St. Michael's Church and later St. Michael's Cathedral until 1960. The house was renovated and expanded during a 1900 remodel by architect John E. Tourtellotte.

The house was listed as Bishop Funsten House on the National Register of Historic Places in 1983.

== History ==
Bishop Daniel Tuttle purchased the city block bounded by Idaho, Bannock, First, and Second Streets in Boise for $375 in 1867, but a rectory was not constructed on the site until 1889. Prior to 1889, St. Michael's rectory was located at the corner of Idaho and 5th Sts., but the earlier house was sold in that year to butcher Tom Woodcock, and a new rectory was constructed at the corner of Idaho and 2nd Sts. by carpenter and undertaker A.G. Lachapelle.

The Reverend D.C. Patee was the first rector to occupy the house, and it was described by the Idaho Statesman in 1891 as "the finest rectory building in the Northwest." The house featured Queen Anne design elements including metal cresting on the ridgebeams, a double overhang in the main front gable, and turned posts on the front porch.

Bishop James B. Funsten arrived in Boise in 1899 and lived at the house until his death in 1918.

In 1900 the house was remodeled by architect John Tourtellotte, and the corner turret and a large, wraparound porch were added. Tourtellotte applied a veneer of Boise sandstone to the outer walls of the main floor and included a gazebo at one end of the new porch.

In 1902 the house was listed in the name of Bishop Funsten as were other church properties. The house was known informally as the bishops' house prior to the 1950s, and occasional reference was made to Bishop Tuttle House in the 1950s and 1960s. In 1960 the Right Rev. Norman L. Foote became the last bishop to occupy the house when it was converted to a meeting facility. It served as Precinct 3, an election polling place, in the 1960s. Renamed the Bishop Rhea Center in 1966 to honor Bishop Frank A. Rhea, the house became a recreation facility for elderly citizens.

The house was moved from its foundation at 120 W Idaho St and relocated at 2420 Old Penitentiary Rd in 1975, after a community effort to save the house from demolition. At its new location, the house is known as The Bishops' House.

== Second Bishop Funsten House ==
Adjacent to Bishop Tuttle House in the St. Michael's Cathedral block is a nonresidential brick structure known as Bishop Funsten House, completed in 1971. The building provides space for offices, classrooms, a library, and a kindergarten.
