= Bishop Daniel S. Tuttle House =

- U.S. National Register of Historic Places
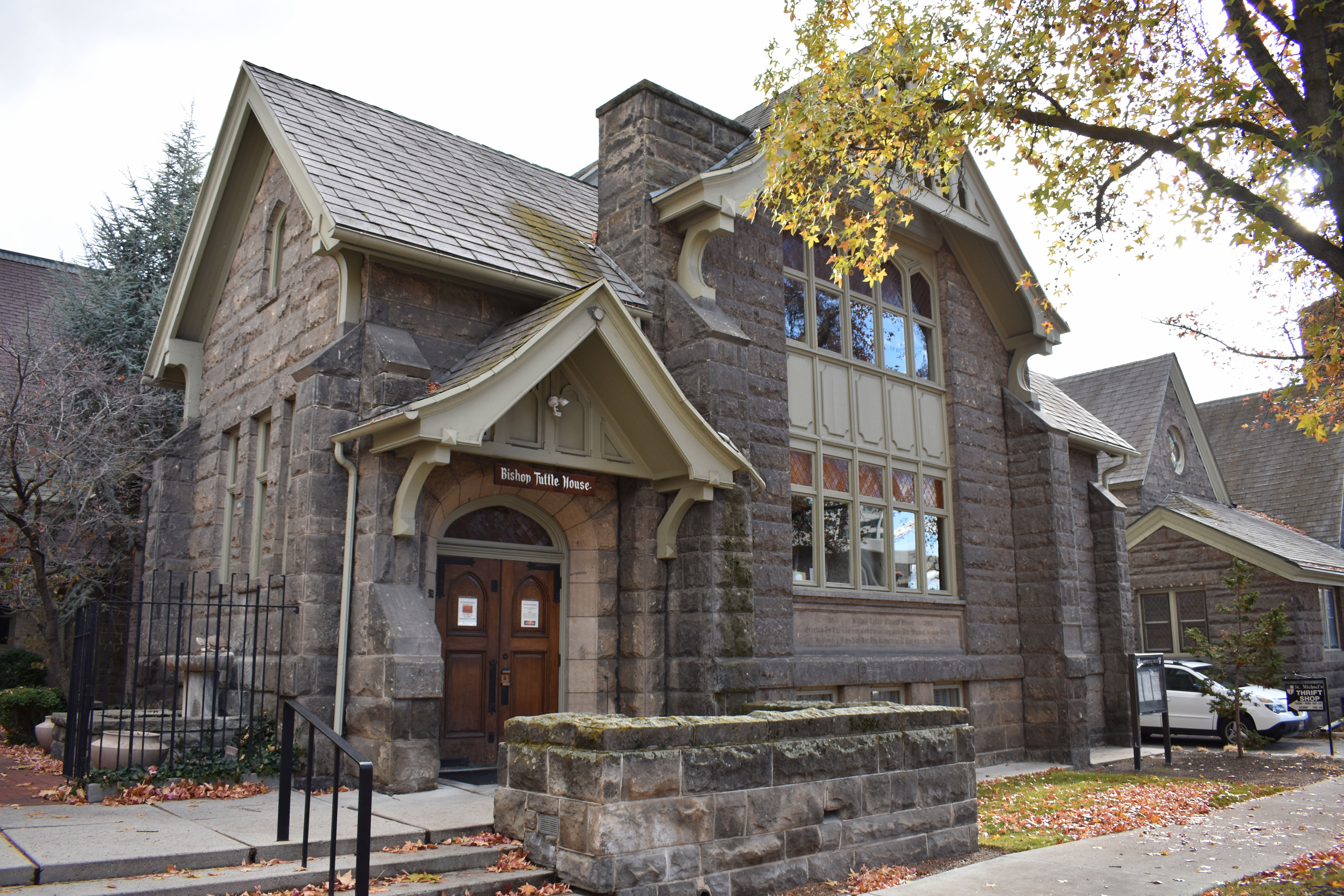
- Bishop Tuttle House in 2018

- Location within Idaho Location within the United States
- Location: 512 N. 8th St., Boise, Idaho
- Coordinates: 43°37′09″N 116°11′56″W
- Area: less than one acre
- Built: 1907
- Architect: Wayland & Fennell
- Architectural style: Tudor Gothic
- NRHP reference No.: 80001291
- Added to NRHP: December 4, 1980

Bishop Daniel S. Tuttle House is a nonresidential building adjacent to St. Michael's Episcopal Cathedral in Boise, Idaho. The building was designed by local architects Wayland & Fennell and constructed in 1907 under the direction of Bishop Funsten of the Episcopal Diocese of Idaho, and the building commemorates the work of Daniel S. Tuttle, first bishop of Idaho.

== History ==
Five years after construction of St. Michael's Cathedral (1902), the congregation and its leadership recognized a need for space devoted to receptions, recitals, classrooms, library, gymnasium, and offices. And from its conception, the new building was also intended to honor the work of Bishop Tuttle. Tudor Gothic style and Boise sandstone were chosen to match the exterior of the adjacent cathedral.

After the Bishop Tuttle House was completed, the Idaho Statesman described it as "a stone building of handsome design...costing nearly $20,000."

== See also ==
Bishop Funsten House
