= General Landry =

General Landry may refer to:

- Robert B. Landry (1909–2000), U.S. Air Force major general
- Hank Landry (Stargate SG-1), a fictional general

== See also ==
- Mary Landry (fl. 2010s), U.S. Coast Guard rear admiral
- Attorney General Landry (disambiguation)
