= St. Luke's Boise Medical Center =

- St. Luke's
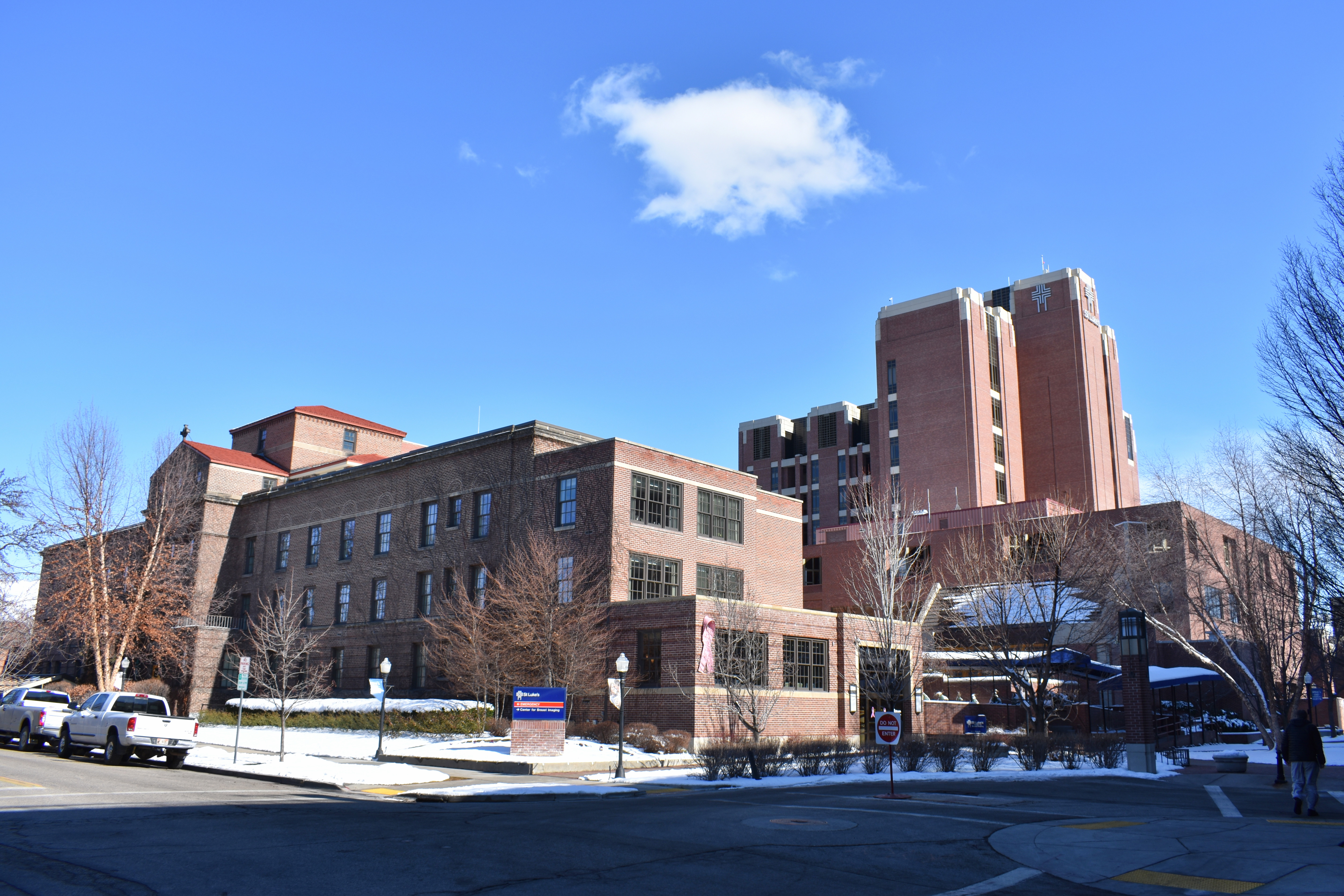
- St. Luke's Boise Medical Center in 2019

Geography
- Location: 190 E Bannock St; Boise, Idaho, USA
- Coordinates: 43.612685°N 116.192500°W

Organisation
- Care system: Private

Services
- Emergency department: Level II pediatric trauma center
- Beds: 437

History
- Founded: 1902

Links
- Website: www.stlukesonline.org
- Lists: Hospitals in Idaho

St. Luke's Boise Medical Center in Boise, Idaho, is a 437-bed hospital founded in 1902 by James Bowen Funsten, bishop of the Episcopal Diocese of Idaho. The hospital is part of St. Luke's Health System, a regional healthcare system with six hospitals and more than 200 clinics staffed by roughly 14,000 employees. In 2017 the system received over 55,000 hospital admissions.

== History ==
The hospital is named for Luke the Evangelist and was dedicated by Bishop Funsten on October 18, 1902, marking St. Luke's Day. Originally a 6-bed facility in a converted 2-story house at the corner of 1st and Bannock Streets, the hospital immediately began to expand with construction of a contagious disease annex. The hospital opened December 8, 1902, and it featured a dining room/office, a private room, a dispensary, and a bathroom on the main floor with an operating room, a ward, and a bathroom on the second floor.

In 1903 plans for a new, larger hospital were drawn by the architecture firm of Tourtellotte & Co. Completed and opened late in 1903, the new St. Luke's was a 3-story, brick and stone building capable of treating 25 patients, with sleeping quarters for nurses and a nurses training school. Wayland & Fennell designed a 3-story wing addition in 1906, with plans for a future second wing. The hospital also made plans to demolish its original building, the converted house, and St. Luke's graduated its first class of nurses at the training school.

A 9-bed children's hospital was constructed adjacent to the main buildings in 1910.

Patients numbered 541 in 1909, and by 1926 the hospital cared for 2005 patients within facilities constructed in 1906. Construction began on a new main hospital building, and in 1928 St. Luke's opened its 4-story building at the corner of 1st and Bannock Streets, adding 67 beds.

In 1947 the hospital again faced overcrowding, partly because of an increase in patients with polio. St. Luke's and its neighbor hospital, St. Alphonsus, initiated the United Hospital Fund Campaign with a goal of constructing new, 100-bed facilities at both hospitals."Campaign for Hospital Expansion Gets Started". Idaho Statesman. Boise, Idaho. November 5, 1947. p. 1. The funding drive raised over $300,000 for each hospital, but by the end of 1949 the funds remained in escrow, unable to cover costs of new construction. Finally in 1950 the hospital broke ground for construction of a new wing.

By 1970 a shortage of hospital beds and crowded facilities prompted St. Luke's to consider another expansion. St. Luke's and St. Alphonsus also were urged to consolidate emergency rooms into one facility and obstetrics into another. Later that year, St. Luke's increased its number of hospital beds to 206. In 1977 St. Luke's expanded again with a 5-level building, bringing its number of hospital beds to 300. The hospital became St. Luke's Regional Medical Center in 1980.

In 1993 St. Luke's opened the first 4-stories of its 10-story tower that now defines the hospital skyline at N 1st and Bannock Sts. In 1999 a new children's hospital was dedicated in existing buildings at the site. The hospital also opened a large parking garage at the site.

The hospital expanded its emergency department in 2001. In 2009 a medical office building was approved by city planners. The building would be connected by skybridge to the east wing of the hospital along Avenue B. The project proposal became part of a larger expansion plan in 2014 that includes a new building with 60 beds, laboratory space, and cardiac care facilities north of E Jefferson St., directly behind the existing hospital. By 2015 the expansion plan had grown to a 4-phase proposal to occur over several decades. Groundbreaking for phase one, a children's hospital pavilion at Avenue B and E Jefferson St., began in 2016.

In 2017 a 98-foot giant sequoia, planted in 1912, was moved from the hospital grounds to provide space for construction. St. Luke's began moving historic homes away from its second E Jefferson St. construction site in 2018.

The hospital is considered a 578-bed hospital when combined with its affiliate hospital in Meridian.
