= Brian J. Thom =

American prelate

The Right Reverend Brian J. Thom
- Bishop of Idaho
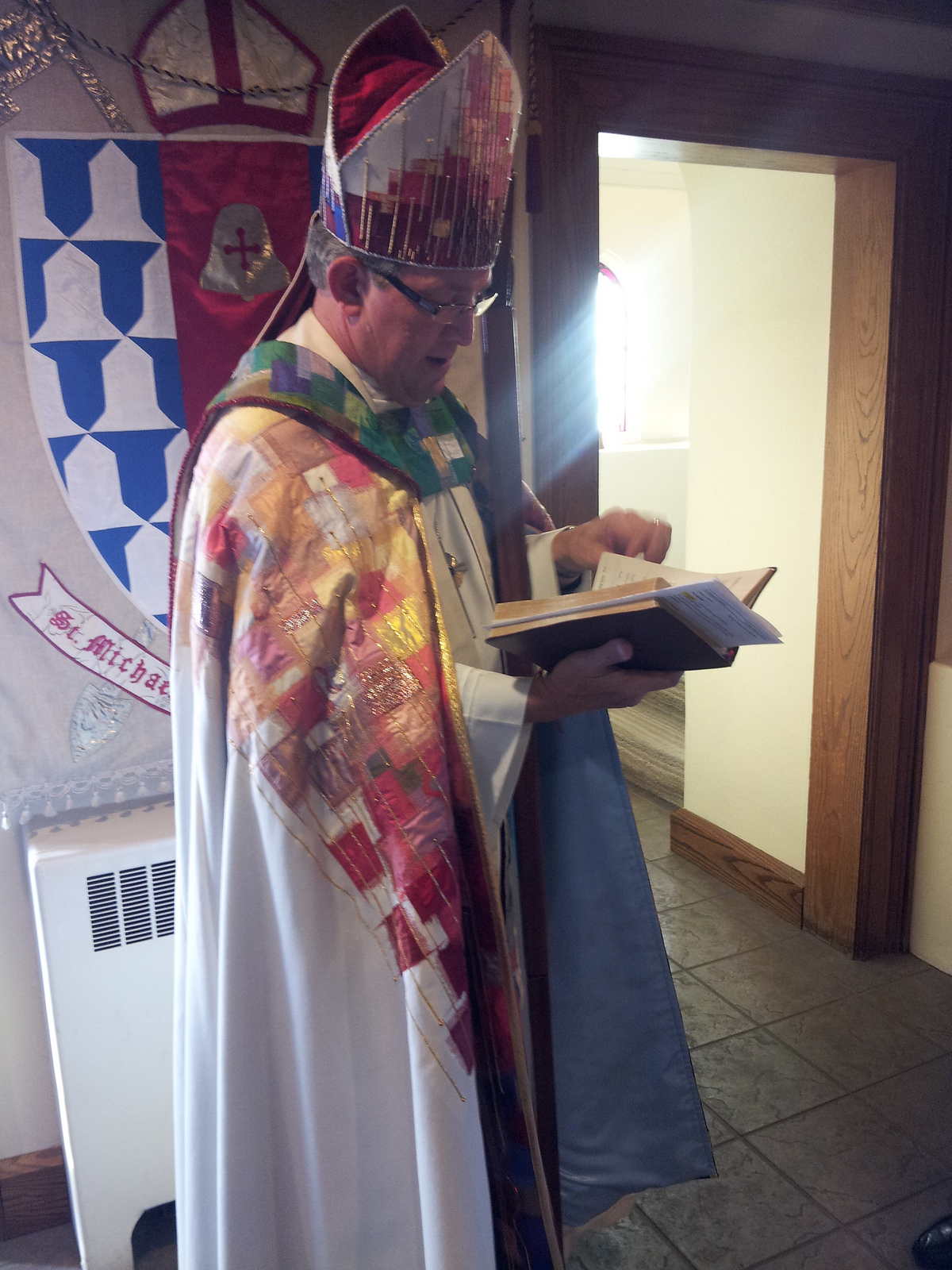
- Church: Episcopal Church
- Diocese: Idaho
- Elected: June 28, 2008
- In office: 2008-2022
- Predecessor: Harry Brown Bainbridge III
- Successor: Jos Tharakan

Orders
- Consecration: October 11, 2008 by Katharine Jefferts Schori

Personal details
- Denomination: Anglican

Brian James Thom is an American prelate of the Episcopal Church who was Bishop of Idaho from 2008 until 2022.

== Biography ==
Thom was born and raised in Portland, Oregon. He attended the Oregon State University in the 1980s from where he earned a Bachelor of Arts in forest management. He also graduated with a Master of Divinity from the Church Divinity School of the Pacific. After ordination he served congregations in Portland and in Palm Desert, California, and then as rector of the Church of the Ascension in Twin Falls, Idaho for 17 years.

He was elected Bishop of Idaho on June 28, 2008 on the sixth ballot, and was consecrated on October 11, 2008 with Presiding Bishop Katharine Jefferts Schori as chief consecrator in the Methodist Cathedral of the Rockies.

== See also ==
- List of Episcopal bishops of the United States
- Historical list of the Episcopal bishops of the United States
