= St. Alphonsus Hospital =

- Formerly listed on the U.S. National Register of Historic Places
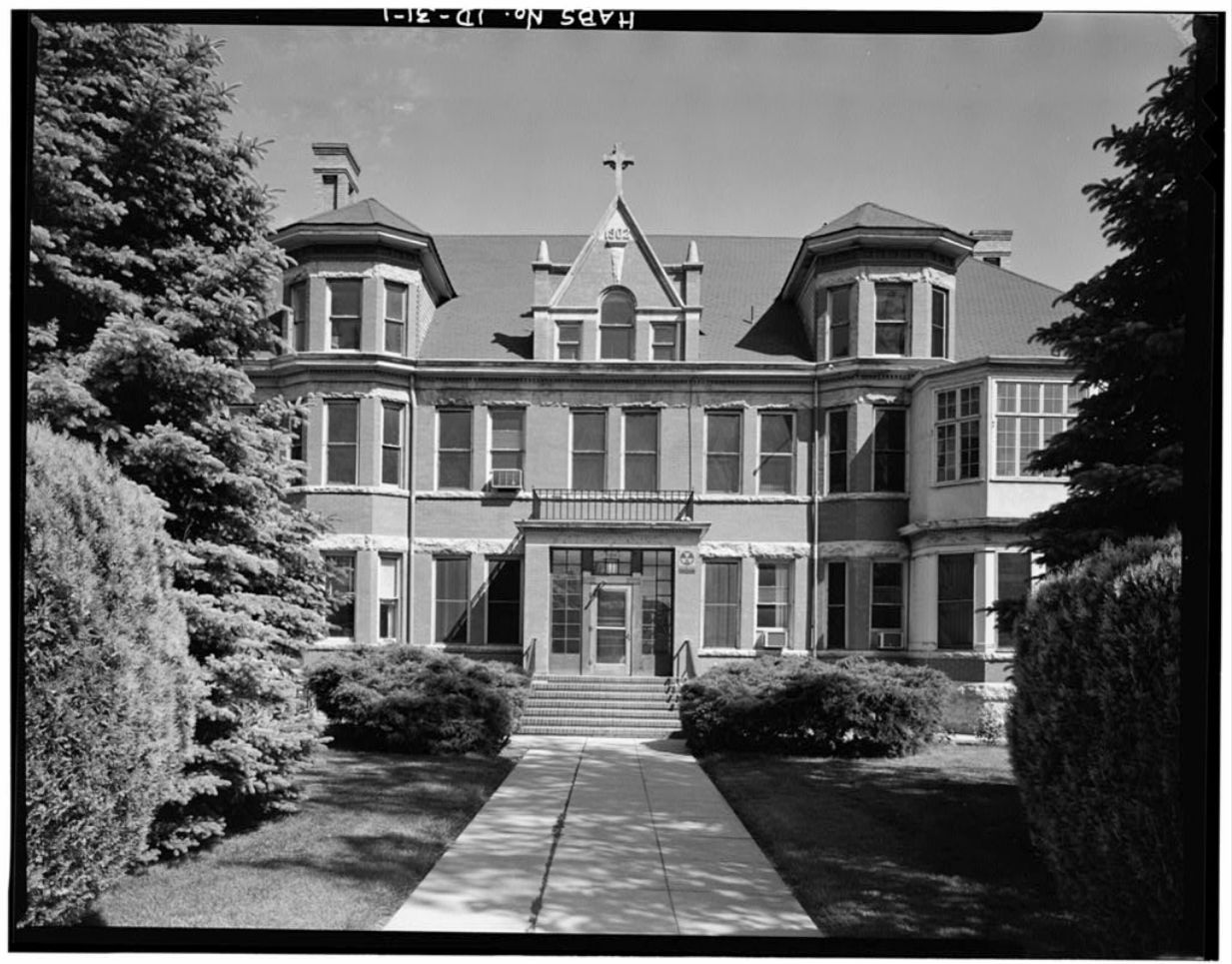
- Main entrance on Fifth Street in 1933

- Location within the United States Location within Idaho
- Location: 508 N. Fifth Street; Boise, Idaho
- Coordinates: 43.617°N 116.196°W
- Area: less than one acre
- Built: 1893
- Architect: Hollowell, J.K.
- Architectural style: French Chateau
- NRHP reference No.: 76000665

Significant dates
- Added to NRHP: July 30, 1976
- Removed from NRHP: February 22, 1977

St. Alphonsus Hospital was a three-story, French Renaissance style building in Boise, Idaho, designed by architect J.K. Hollowell in 1893. Completed in 1894, the hospital was part of a small group of buildings constructed by the Roman Catholic Diocese of Boise that included St. Teresa's Academy (demolished).

Located at Fifth Street between State and Washington streets, the hospital building was added to the National Register of Historic Places in 1976, soon after it became slated for demolition. It was delisted shortly thereafter in 1977.

== History ==
A hospital had been discussed in Boise City earlier than the 1890s, and Bishop Glorieux of the Catholic Diocese had indicated as early as 1891 that a hospital would be constructed under his supervision. St. Alphonsus Hospital opened in December 1894, under direction of five nurses of the Sisters of the Holy Cross, and it became the seventh hospital controlled by the order. The building's first floor was complete, but the second floor was only partially complete, and the third floor remained unimproved. The first floor contained a six-bed wardroom, an operating room illuminated by sunlight, a smoking room, a drug room, and a dining room with kitchen. The Idaho Statesman said of the wardroom, "so neat and cozy, one would almost wish to be ill in order to have the privilege of using it."

During 1895, the hospital received 107 patients, and of the total, 78 were cured, 11 improved, and 14 died. Local doctors had treated patients at the building, but in 1896 the hospital acquired a staff of physicians and surgeons. The staff included Major M.W. Wood, Dr. R.M. Fairchild, Dr. C.L. Sweet, Dr. W.D. Springer, Dr. George Collister, Dr. D.W. Figgins, Dr. L.C. Bowers, Dr. H. Ziph, and anaesthetist Dr. W.H. Schuyler.

Two blocks east of the state capitol building, the hospital was purchased by the State of Idaho in 1971 to be converted to office space, but after several arson fires during renovation in 1976, it became unsafe and was razed to provide space for a new state office building. Completed in the late 1970s, the replacement ten-story building was named for longtime Secretary of State Pete Cenarrusa in 1998; its address is 450 West State Street, facing the Idaho Supreme Court.

The hospital moved about three miles (5 km) west in 1972 to its present site on Curtis Road, just south of I-184. Boise's other hospital, St. Luke's, was founded by the Episcopal Diocese of Idaho in 1902 and is located several blocks southeast of the Cenarrusa building.

== See also ==
- Alphonsus Liguori
- St. Alphonsus' Hospital Nurses' Home and Heating Plant/Laundry
- List of hospitals in Idaho
- National Register of Historic Places listings in Ada County, Idaho
