= List of hospitals in Idaho =

This is a list of hospitals in Idaho, located in the Northwestern United States.

== Hospitals ==
Hospital	City	Bed count	Trauma center	Stroke center	STEMI center	Notes
Bear Lake Memorial Hospital	Montpelier	21	Level IV			
Benewah Community Hospital	St. Maries	19				Critical access hospital
Bingham Memorial Hospital	Blackfoot	65	Level IV			Critical access hospital
Boise Veterans Affairs Medical Center	Boise	46				
Bonner General Hospital	Sandpoint	25	Level IV	Level III	Level II	Critical access hospital
Boundary Community Hospital	Bonners Ferry	20	Level IV	Level III	Level II	Critical access hospital
Caribou Memorial Hospital	Soda Springs	25	Level IV			Critical access hospital
Cascade Medical Center	Cascade	8				Critical access hospital
Cassia Regional Medical Center	Burley	25		Level III	Level II	Critical access hospital
Clearwater Valley Hospital	Orofino	23	Level IV			Critical access hospital
Eastern Idaho Regional Medical Center	Idaho Falls	289	Level II	Level II	Level I	
Franklin County Medical Center	Preston	20				Critical access hospital
Gritman Medical Center	Moscow	25	Level IV			Critical access hospital
Idaho Falls Community Hospital	Idaho Falls	88	Level IV	Level III	Level II	
Kootenai Health	Coeur d'Alene	330	Level II			
Lost Rivers Medical Center	Arco	14	Level IV			Critical access hospital
Madison Memorial Hospital	Rexburg	67	Level IV			
Minidoka Memorial Hospital	Rupert	25			Level II	Critical access hospital
Nell J. Redfield Memorial Hospital	Malad	11	Level IV			Critical access hospital
North Canyon Medical Center	Gooding	18				Critical access hospital
Portneuf Medical Center	Pocatello	205	Level II		Level I	
Power County Hospital	American Falls	10				Critical access hospital
Saint Alphonsus Eagle	Eagle					Stand-alone emergency room only with attached primary care clinic
Saint Alphonsus Medical Center - Nampa	Nampa	106	Level IV	Level III	Level I	
Saint Alphonsus Neighborhood Hospital - South Nampa	Nampa	8				Stand-alone emergency room only with attached primary and specialty care clinic.
Saint Alphonsus Regional Medical Center	Boise	362	Level II	Level I		Includes Nurses' Home and Heating Plant/Laundry
Shoshone Medical Center	Kellogg	21				
St. Joseph Regional Medical Center	Lewiston	145	Level III	Level II		
St. Luke's Boise Medical Center	Boise	437		Level I	Level I	
St. Luke's Elmore Medical Center	Mountain Home	25				Critical access hospital
St. Luke's Fruitland	Fruitland				Level II	Stand-alone emergency room only with attached primary and specialty care clinic
St. Luke's Jerome	Jerome	25				Critical access hospital
St. Luke's Magic Valley Medical Center	Twin Falls	224	Level III	Level II	Level I	
St. Luke's McCall	McCall	15	Level IV			Critical access hospital
St. Luke's Meridian Medical Center	Meridian	167	Level IV	Level II	Level I	
St. Luke's Nampa Medical Center	Nampa	87			Level II	
St. Luke's Wood River Medical Center	Ketchum	25	Level IV			Critical access hospital
St. Mary's Hospital	Cottonwood	25	Level IV			Critical access hospital
Steele Memorial Medical Center	Salmon	18	Level IV			Critical access hospital
Syringa General Hospital	Grangeville	16	Level IV			Critical access hospital
Teton Valley Hospital	Driggs	13	Level IV	Level III	Level II	Critical access hospital
Valor Health	Emmett	16				Critical access hospital
Weiser Memorial Hospital	Weiser	25				Critical access hospital
West Valley Medical Center	Caldwell	150		Level III	Level II	
