= Robert Landry =

Robert Landry may refer to:

- Robert C. Landry (born 1962), Canadian jockey
- Robert Watson Landry (1922–2017), American politician in the Wisconsin State Assembly.
- Robert B. Landry (1909–2000), United States Air Force general
