= Jos Tharakan =

Author and Episcopal Church Bishop of Idaho

The Right Reverend Jos Tharakan
- Bishop of Idaho
- Church: Episcopal Church
- Diocese: Idaho
- Elected: February 19, 2022
- In office: 2022-present
- Predecessor: Brian J. Thom

Orders
- Ordination: December 30, 1994
- Consecration: June 25, 2022 by Michael Curry

Personal details
- Born: Kerala, India
- Denomination: Anglican
- Spouse: Kimby
- Children: 6

Joseph "Jos" Tharakan is an American author, musician, and prelate of the Episcopal Church who currently serves as the Bishop of Idaho.

== Early years ==
Tharakan was born in Kerala, India and was raised as a Roman Catholic. After completing high school at the age of 15 he joined the Order of Friars Minor Capuchin. In 1989 he graduated from Delhi University with a Bachelor of Arts in economics, Politics, English and Malayalam. He then attended Calvary Philosophical College where he studied Philosophy and Psychology, graduating in 1991 and then theology at the Capuchin Vidyabhavan in Kerala. He was ordained a priest on December 30, 1994, and was appointed to serve in the North Indian Missions of the Capuchins. He later served as a chaplain to the Missionaries of Charity of Mother Theresa in Delhi. he also held posts as assistant director of the Media House Publication Center, itinerant preacher, spiritual director, Theology Professor, music composer, and interim High School Principal for St Paul's and Holy Angels in Uttar Pradesh. In 1997 he moved to the United States and served in the Roman Catholic Diocese of Little Rock until 2001. After that he moved to Chester, Arkansas where he worked on a farm while also undertaking studies in Clinical Pastoral Education in San Antonio and Pine Bluff.

== Episcopal Church ==
In 2006, Tharakan joined the Episcopal Church and was appointed missionary chaplain at Christ Church in Mena, Arkansas. In 2007 he became rector of All Saints' Church in Russellville, Arkansas, where he remained until 2022.

== Bishop ==
On February 19, 2022, Tharakan was elected Bishop of Idaho and consecrated on June 25, 2022, at the Cathedral of the Rockies in Boise.
