= Harry Brown Bainbridge III =

American bishop

The Right Reverend Harry Brown Bainbridge III
- Bishop of Idaho
- Church: Episcopal Church
- Diocese: Idaho
- Elected: February 14, 1998
- In office: 1998–2008
- Predecessor: John S. Thornton
- Successor: Brian J. Thom

Orders
- Ordination: 1968
- Consecration: June 6, 1998 by John S. Thornton

Personal details
- Born: July 25, 1939 Knoxville, Tennessee, United States
- Died: May 27, 2010 (aged 70) Easton, Maryland, United States
- Denomination: Anglican
- Parents: Harry Brown Bainbridge II, Grace Holt
- Spouse: Katherine "Kit" Turnbull (1941-2021)
- Children: 2

Harry Brown Bainbridge III (July 25, 1939 – May 27, 2010) was an American bishop. He was the bishop of the Episcopal Diocese of Idaho from 1998 to 2008.

== Education ==
Bainbridge was born in Knoxville, Tennessee, on July 25, 1939, son of Harry Brown Bainbridge II (1914-1955) and Grace Stringer Holt (1917-2014).

He was raised in Oak Ridge, Tennessee, and attended Sewanee: The University of the South from where he graduated with a Bachelor of Arts in 1961. He served for two years in the U.S. Navy and later returned to Sewanee to study for his Master of Divinity which he received in 1967. He received a Doctor of Ministry degree from Sewanee in 1992.

== Ministry ==
Bainbridge was ordained deacon in 1967 and served as deacon-in-charge of Holy Trinity Church in Memphis, Tennessee, where he remained till he was ordained a priest a year later. In 1968 he became rector of the Church of St Mary Magdalene in Fayetteville, Tennessee and in 1970 transferred to St Thomas' Church in Knoxville, Tennessee. In 1973 he became assistant chaplain in Sewanee University and also taught religion at the same university. In 1979 he became chaplain of the University of Louisiana at Monroe and rector of the Church of St Thomas in Monroe, Louisiana. He also served as rector of Christ Church in Easton, Maryland from 1988 till 1998.

== Bishop ==
Bainbridge was elected Coadjutor Bishop of Idaho on February 14, 1998. He was consecrated on June 6, 1998, by Bishop John S. Thornton of Idaho in the First United Methodist Church in Boise, Idaho.

He succeeded as diocesan bishop on November 1, 1998. He retired in 2008.

== Death and personal life ==
He died on May 27, 2010, in Talbot Hospice Guest House in Easton, Maryland, after battling lung cancer and heart complications since 2007.

Bainbridge married Katherine Turnbull on June 19, 1963, and they had two children.
