= Frank A. Rhea =

American bishop

The Right Reverend Frank Archibald Rhea D.D.
- Bishop of Idaho
- Church: Episcopal Church
- Diocese: Idaho
- Elected: February 1942
- In office: 1942–1957
- Predecessor: Frederick B. Bartlett
- Successor: Norman L. Foote

Orders
- Ordination: June 11, 1916 by Frederick Foote Johnson
- Consecration: April 29, 1942 by Arthur Moulton

Personal details
- Born: August 23, 1887 Dixon, Missouri, United States
- Died: October 31, 1963 (aged 76) Seattle, Washington, United States
- Buried: Morris Hill Cemetery, Boise
- Denomination: Anglican
- Parents: James Francis Rhea & Kathryn Milligan
- Spouse: Edith Hottenstein (m. 1915; died 1930) Laura P. Wilson (m. 1963)
- Children: 4

Frank Archibald Rhea (September 26, 1887 – October 31, 1963) was bishop of the Episcopal Diocese of Idaho, serving from 1942 to 1968.

== Early life and education ==
Rhea was born on September 26, 1887, in Dixon, Missouri, the son of James Francis Rhea and Kathryn Milligan. He attended Sewanee Military Academy and later graduated from St Stephen's College in 1912. He enrolled at the Berkeley Divinity School, from which he graduated with a Bachelor of Sacred Theology in 1915. He was awarded an honorary Doctor of Divinity from College of Idaho.

== Ordination ==
Rhea was ordained deacon on June 2, 1915 by Bishop Chauncey B. Brewster of Connecticut, and priest on June 11, 1916 by the Coadjutor of Missouri Frederick Foote Johnson. He was appointed as priest in charge of the missions in Sisseton, South Dakota and chaplain of the army camps in the west of Texas. In 1918 he became rector of Trinity Church in Victoria, Texas while in 1919 he became in charge of the mission of the Incarnation in Texas. He transferred as rector of St Mark's Church in Beaumont, Texas in 1923, where he remained till 1928. In 1928 he was appointed Dean of St Michael's Cathedral in Boise, Idaho.

== Episcopacy ==
Rhea was elected as missionary Bishop of Idaho in February 1942. He was consecrated on April 29, 1942, by Arthur Moulton, Bishop of Utah, in St Michael's Cathedral in Boise, Idaho. After retirement, Rhea served as pastor of Trinity Church in Seattle. He also acted as assistant bishop to the Bishop of Olympia. He retained his post till his retirement in 1957. Rhea died in his sleep on October 31, 1963.

== Family ==
Rhea married Edith Hottenstein (1884-1930) with whom he had four daughters. Upon her death he married Canadian Laura Pearle Wilson (1902-1964) in 1936.
