= Saint Barnabas on the Desert =

- The Episcopal Parish of Saint Barnabas on the Desert
- Location within Arizona
- 33.53557°N 111.93336°W
- Location: 6715 N Mockingbird Lane Paradise Valley, Arizona
- Country: United States
- Denomination: Episcopalian
- Website: saintbarnabas.org

History
- Founded: 1953, First service held on March 3, 1954
- Dedicated: November 12, 1961
- Consecrated: February 1, 1973

Architecture
- Architect: T.S. Montgomery
- Style: Mediterranean contemporary
- Years built: 1960-61
- Groundbreaking: December 4, 1960
- Completed: September 10, 1961
- Construction cost: $456,950

Administration
- Metropolis: Phoenix
- Diocese: Arizona

Clergy
- Bishop: Jennifer Reddall
- Rector: The Rev. Dr. Robyn M. Neville

Saint Barnabas on the Desert is an Episcopal church located in Paradise Valley, Arizona. Founded as a mission church in 1953, the church was granted parish status in 1955, and was incorporated in 1958. The church moved into its present structure in 1961. The church reported 1,514 members in 2018 and 1,159 members in 2023; no membership statistics were reported in 2024 parochial reports. Plate and pledge income reported for the congregation in 2024 was $1,708,889. Average Sunday attendance (ASA) in 2024 was 361 persons.

== History ==
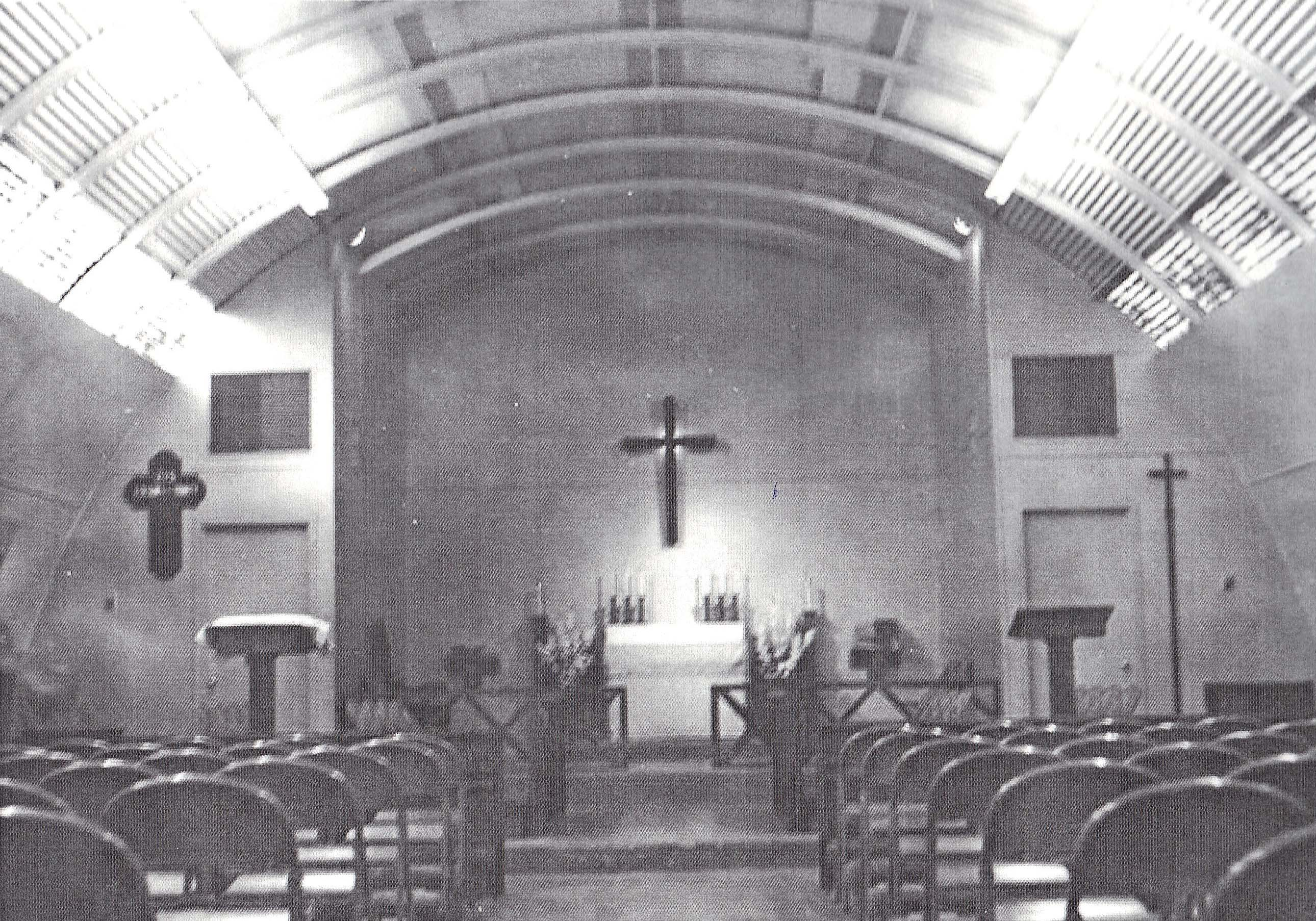
Interior of the Quonset Hut

The parish was founded as a mission church in 1953, with its first service being held on November 15, 1953. Initial services were held in various locations on private properties, until moved to a Quonset hut located at 132 W. Main Street in Scottsdale, which was consecrated on October 3, 1954. Paul L. West was named as the parish's first rector in 1954, and Saint Barnabas held its first service on March 3, 1954, which was Ash Wednesday. By the end of 1954 the mission church was financially self-sufficient. On January 4, 1955, Mr. & Mrs. Fowler McCormick donated the land on Mockingbird Lane in Paradise Valley where the current structure is located, very close to the property they would later donate to the city of Scottsdale for the McCormick-Stillman Railroad Park. The ten acre parcel sat across the street from the Judson School.

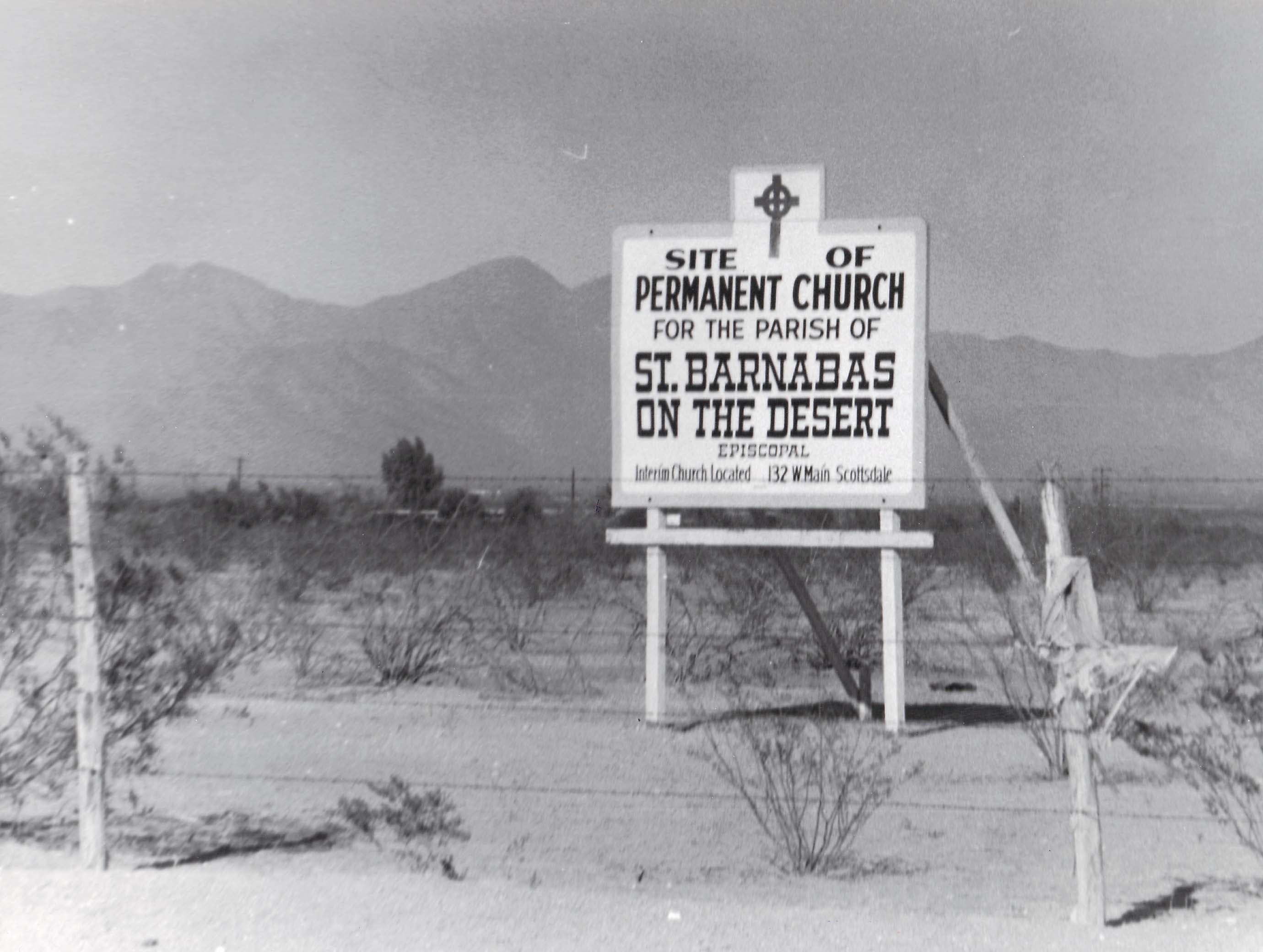
Pre-construction site

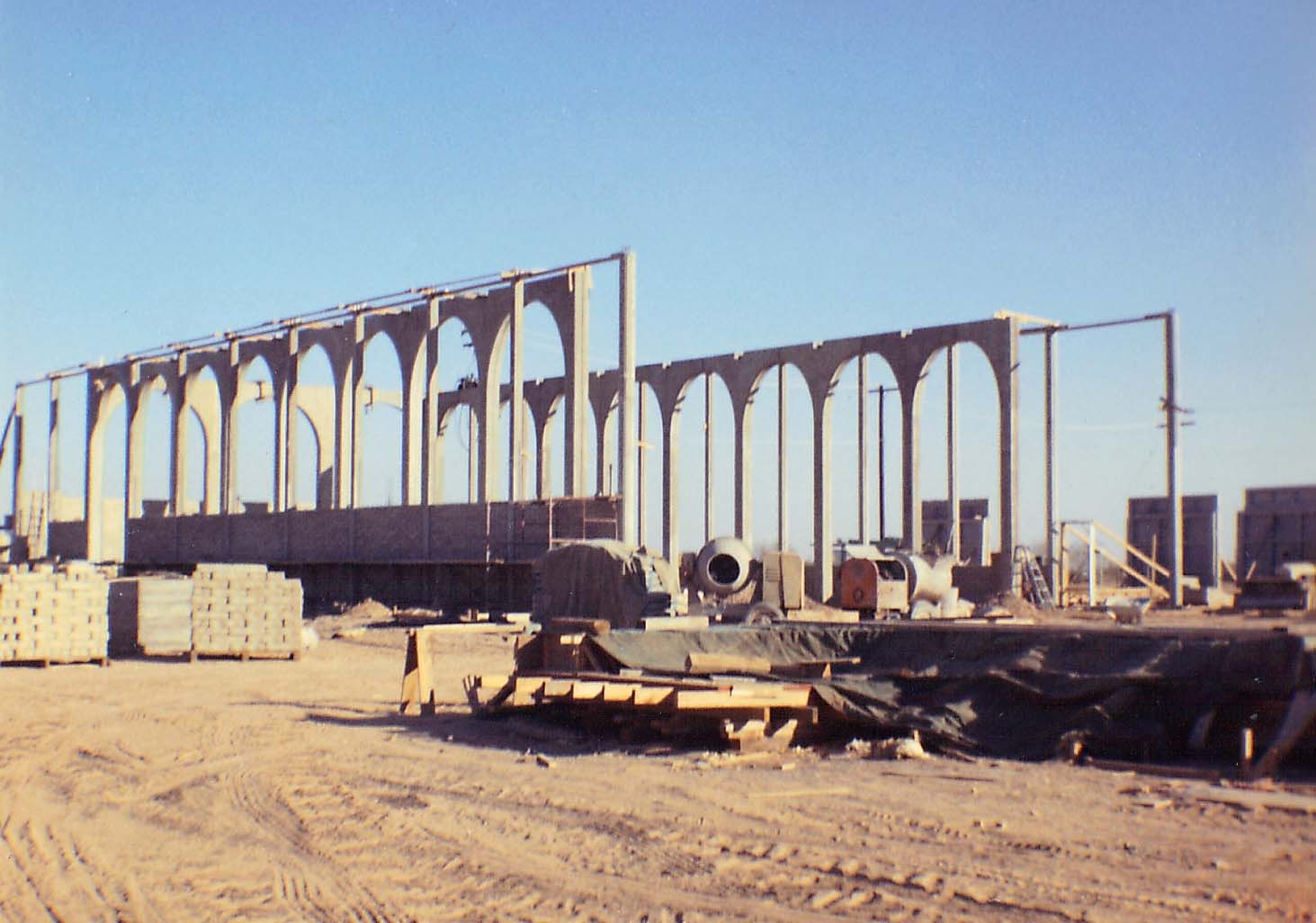
Sanctuary under construction

While continuing to conduct services in the Main Street location, the parish began raising funds for a permanent structure to be built on the donated property. Part of the Arizona Missionary Jurisdiction, the church was granted parish status by Bishop Arthur Barksdale Kinsolving II on November 1, 1955 (All Saints Day). On May 2, 1958, the church was officially incorporated in the state of Arizona. Later that year, the Missionary District officially became a Diocese of the Episcopal Church. In September 1959 Henry B. Getz became the rector of the parish. In 1959, the design and construction of the new church building was awarded to T.S. Montgomery. In September 1960 it was announced that the parish had accepted the conceptual drawings for the church complex to be built on their 10-acre parcel. The design included four buildings. A 460-seat main sanctuary, a 60-seat chapel, and offices would occupy the main building; a meeting hall with kitchen facilities would be a second building, with the remaining two buildings housing 24 classroom and small meeting rooms. The estimated cost of construction was $456,950. The sanctuary's original design contains rhythmic columns and arches, a high ceiling and a raised circular altar. Construction on the current sanctuary, along with the chapel, offices and one of the two 12 room education buildings began in 1960, with the official ground breaking occurring on December 4. It was undertaken by the Redden Construction Company of Phoenix. Construction was completed the following year and the first service in the present sanctuary was held on September 11, 1961. On November 12, 1961, all the new buildings were dedicated. The sanctuary was "originally designed to have the acoustic properties of larger cathedrals". 1961 also saw the creation of the Church's "Memorial Acceptance and Fine Arts" committee (MAFA). Composed of between seven and nine congregation members with fine arts interests, the committee is responsible for approving all religious items, artwork, and decorations for the church. The first work commissioned and completed was a baptismal font, designed by Paradise Valley artists, Allen Ditson and Lee Porzio.

When the church installed its new organ in 1962, the notable American organist, Richard Purvis, flew into Scottsdale to perform the dedication ceremony. The parish hall, originally known as The Great Hall now called Hutton Hall, was built in 1964 for a cost of $123,900. Each member of the vestry pledged $10,000 toward construction and signed a note to serve as collateral to secure the mortgage. The following year John H. Parke became rector.

In November 1970, William Purdis Rowland was installed as the parish's new rector. In 1973, in honor of the congregation paying off the original mortgage, a mortgage burning ceremony was held. The church was consecrated, and blessed by several Episcopalian dignitaries, including George R. Selway, Robert Donohoe (the ecumenical director of the Episcopal Diocese of Arizona), and the former pastor of St. Barnabas, Henry B. Getz. The consecration took place because a church in the Episcopal faith may not be consecrated until it is debt-free ("all possibility of alienation to secular uses be erased"). The sanctuary received new main doors which involved a new art form invented by Ditson and Porzio, called "traforato". The doors are cut forms of steel depicting scenes of children in the Bible, as well as the different stages of childhood. The cut steel is encased in glass. Some of the scenes depicted include David and Goliath and Tobias. Also seen in the artwork include images of musical instruments, natural objects and animals. In addition to the doors, Ditson and Porzio created many other pieces of artwork for the church. Among these include a massive tapestry entitled, "Ode to Joy," designed by Porzio; the main altar and cross, acolyte chairs, candelabra, and various basins and stands.

1976 saw the completion of the parish's memorial garden, located to the north of the main sanctuary; the garden had its first interment in February of that year. An addition to the southeast corner of the office building housing clergy offices was completed in 1984. The bookstore was established that same year. The second education building, the learning center, located to the east of the initial education structure and to the north of the memorial garden, and a playground were both erected in 1988. They was designed by Montgomery's successor Tempe architect Craig Waling. The last of the three education buildings, named "Sean's Place", was built in 1999, located just to the east of the learning center.

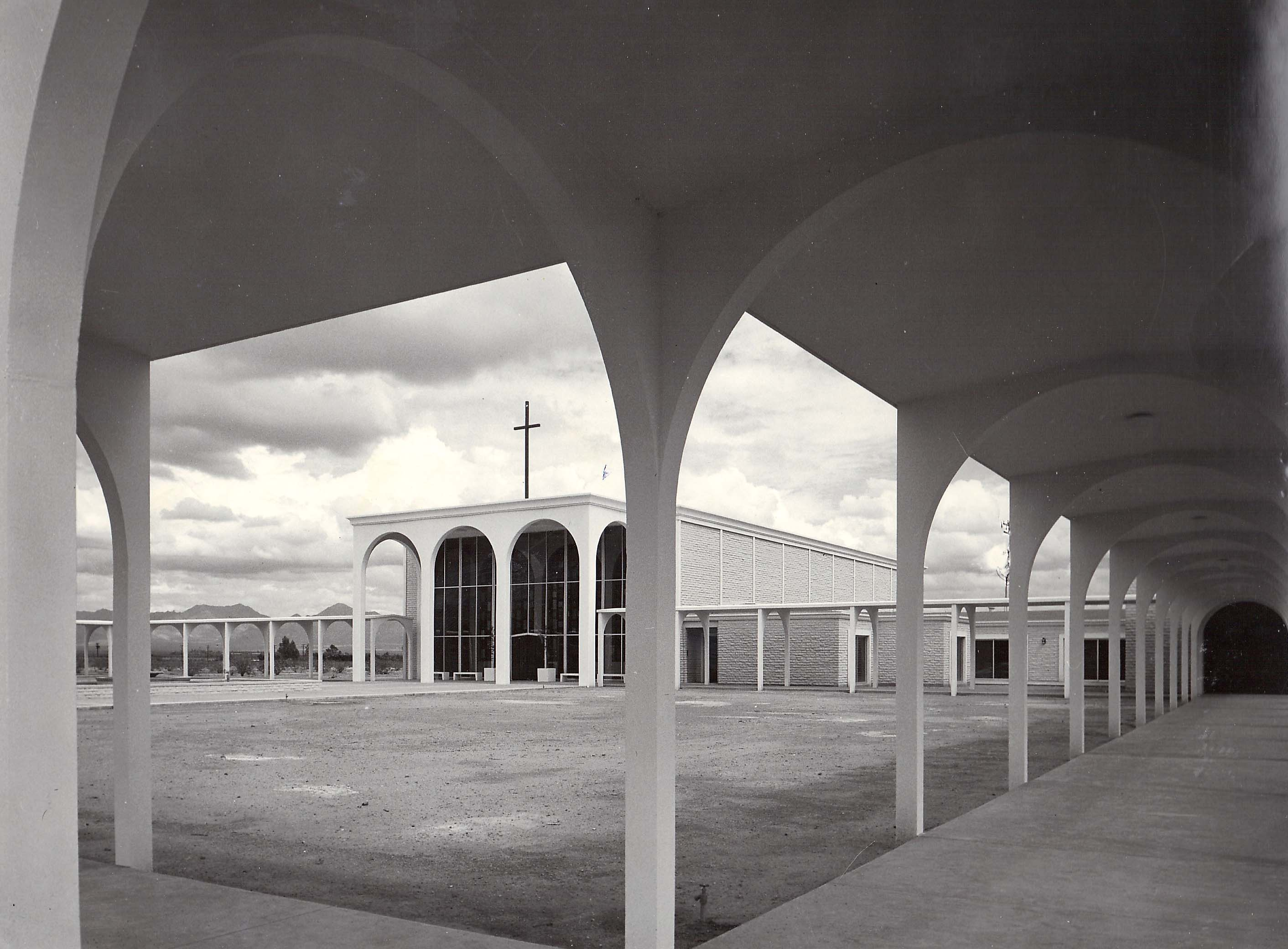
Sanctuary, opening week 1961

In 2006 the parish underwent a building expansion which saw the addition of a music center, a new bookstore and lounge, and renovation of the existing parish hall. The new buildings were designed by Knoell & Quidort Architects. The music center includes a tower containing a 25-bell carillon, designed by Royal Eijsbouts. The carillon is the only carillon in the state of Arizona, and only one of approximately 200 in all of the United States. The bells were dedicated in a special concert on October 7, 2006. The set consists of 25 bells, weighing 4,074 pounds, and are played electronically every hour from 9 am to 6 pm, with occasional manual performances as well. The bells were dedicated to John S. Thornton and his wife, Jan. Thornton had served as Rector of the parish from 2002 to 2004.

The sanctuary underwent a $4.5M renovation in 2010. The updates included replacing the 2,768-pipe organ dedicated in February 1962, as well the tapestry, "Ode to Joy," which had been damaged over the year due to exposure to light. The organ was replaced by Casavant Frères, the same company which had crafted the original organ, this time with 2,929 pipes. The organ was donated by John C. and Mary Dell Pritzlaff. Also during the renovation a new sound system was installed, to relieve ongoing acoustical issues. A unique feature was combining the organ's pipes with a mosaic, titled "Wondrous Love", which spans the back wall of the sanctuary, designed by renowned Canadian glass artist, Sarah Hall.

In 2016 plans were announced for a Ritz-Carlton Resort and residences to be built on the desert surrounding the church campus. In response the parish began a capital campaign raising funds for campus improvements. The campaign entitled Welcoming the Neighborhood aimed at making the campus more inviting and accessible. The first phase included a renovation of the 60 year old Children's Center and playground. Redden Construction who had originally built the building returned to complete this work. The renovation was completed with a dedication ceremony on October 17, 2021. The second phase began in April 2023 and included exterior improvements including repairing the parking lot and installing covered walkways. The second part of this phase included a renovation of Hutton Hall which included a new kitchen and improved restrooms.This work was completed in late 2023.In February 2024 Jim Clark who had been rector for 20 years retired. At the time of his retirement the parishes chapel was renamed in his honor. Dan Burner became the church's interim rector following Clark's retirement. In April 2026 The Rev. Dr. Robyn M. Neville was installed as the church's new rector.

== Saint Barnabas today ==
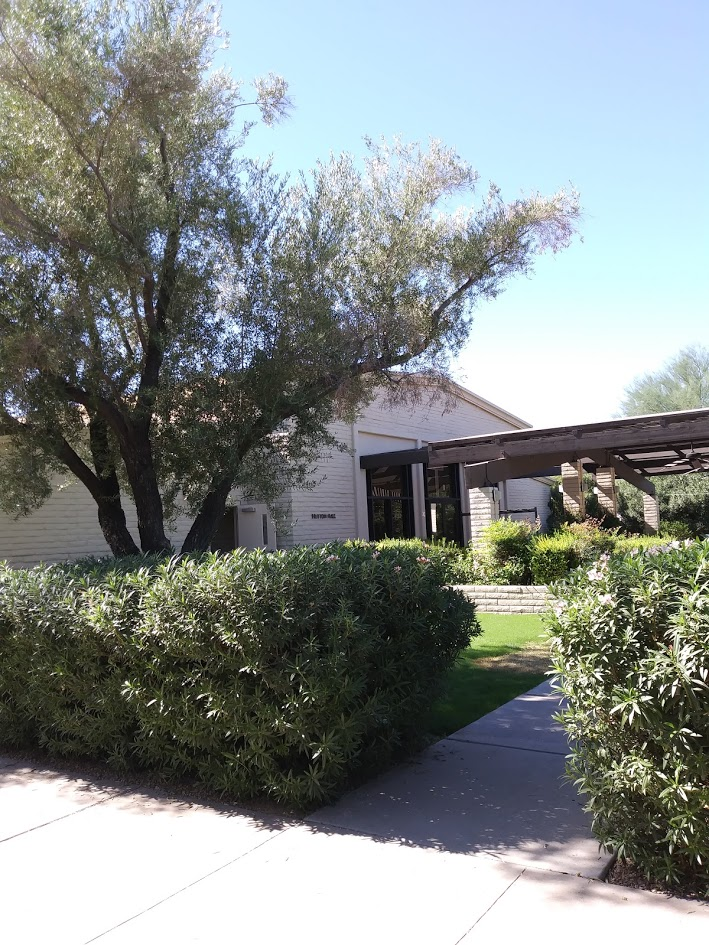
Hutton Hall, constructed in 1964

Saint Barnabas is one of the Arizona centers for Contemplative Outreach, for those interested in the practice of Centering Prayer as taught by Father Thomas Keating.

Outside organizations are also allowed to use the church's facilities, including Alcoholics Anonymous.

Saint Barnabas' former Rector, Jim Clark, along with clergy colleagues, parishioners, and biblical scholars, has developed a specific type of small group Bible study, called "The Art of Engaging Holy Scripture" (TAEHS). The practice is meant to create "... a lively method of engaging the Scriptures through reading and study, conversational prayer and silent prayer, and group sharing." The practice gives the participants a succinct Biblical and Ecclesiological framework to enhance their prayer life and bible study, both in group sessions and on their own.

The church also has its own chapter of the Order of Saint Luke.

== Current Grounds ==
Since the construction of the original sanctuary, chapel office and education buildings, the grounds have grown over the decades. A state of the art music building lay across the courtyard from the sanctuary. The church's carillon is housed in the building. North of the music building is another structure holding a bookstore and coffee shop. Hutton Hall lies still further to the north, which also contains the parish's kitchen. To the north of the sanctuary lie the Memorial Garden, with a Labyrinth just to its east. The most northerly buildings include the original education structure, which has now been joined by two more education/meeting buildings, which also house the parish's library. The rest of the campus contains gardens, walkways, parking lots and a children's playground. Covered walkways connect the various structures. The main sanctuary incorporates indirect lighting sources which "provide a visual depth to the contemplative space."

The campus contains several pieces of art. Until its removal to a climate controlled facility, a tapestry by Lee Porzio and Allen Ditson's, "Ode to Joy," hung behind the altar. Hanging behind its counterpart in the chapel is a 15th-century oil painting by Francesco Zaganelli. Ditson created the main altar, based on the concept of the crown of thorns as the support for a ship, symbolizing the church. However, that design was not accepted by the church's fine arts committee, and so was modified to its current form. The current base is made of triangular pieces of flamed steel, symbolizing mind, heart, and spirit, the three aspects of mind. Man's constant striving to reach ever upward is symbolized by the stand's pyramid shape. Other items designed by either Porzio or Ditson include the main sanctuary cross, candelabras, the door to the chapel, and alms basins.

== Notable parishioners/clergy ==
- Sandra Day O'Connor – first woman Justice on the U.S. Supreme Court
- John Pritzlaff – Member of the Arizona House of Representatives, and the Arizona State Senate
- Fife Symington – Former Governor of Arizona, and his wife, Ann Pritzlaff Symington, deacon
- John S. Thornton – Episcopal Bishop
