= Norman L. Foote =

American bishop

The Right Reverend Norman Landon Foote D.D., S.T.D.
- Bishop of Idaho
- Church: Episcopal Church
- Diocese: Idaho
- Elected: 1956
- In office: 1957–1972
- Predecessor: Frank A. Rhea
- Successor: Hanford L. King Jr.

Orders
- Ordination: December 1940 by Henry H. Daniels
- Consecration: February 14, 1957 by Henry Knox Sherrill

Personal details
- Born: November 30, 1915 Saratoga Springs, New York, United States
- Died: May 12, 1974 (aged 58) Cascade, Idaho, United States
- Denomination: Anglican
- Spouse: Carolyn Hope Swayne (m. 1940)
- Children: 4

Norman Landon Foote (November 30, 1915 – May 12, 1974) was the tenth bishop of the Episcopal Diocese of Idaho from 1957 to 1972.

== Early life and education ==
Foote was born on November 30, 1915, in Saratoga Springs, New York, the son of Leroy Herman Foote (1883-1939) and UK-born Amy Verina Close (1882-1974). Foote was educated at the Saratoga public schools and graduated from Saratoga High School in 1933. He later enrolled at Hamilton College, where he studied for one year before transferring to Princeton University in 1934, from which he graduated with a B.A. in history in 1937. Later, Foote studied at the General Theological Seminary from which he graduated with a Bachelor of Sacred Theology in 1940. In 1957, he was awarded an honorary Doctor of Sacred Theology from the General Theological Seminary and a Doctor of Divinity from Church Divinity School of the Pacific.

== Priest ==
Foote was ordained deacon in Albany, New York, in May 1940 by Bishop G. Ashton Oldham. His first post was as deacon in the missionary district of Montana. He was ordained priest in December 1940 in Bozeman, Montana, by Bishop Henry H. Daniels, after which he served as a missionary priest in Virginia City, Montana. He became Archdeacon of Montana in 1943. In 1950 he was appointed Director of the National Town-Country Church Institute.

== Bishop ==
Foote was elected missionary Bishop of Idaho in 1956. He was consecrated on February 14, 1957, in St Michael's Cathedral in Boise, Idaho, by Presiding Bishop Henry Knox Sherrill. Foote became the first bishop of the newly created Diocese of Idaho in 1967. He retired on February 14, 1972, due to ill health and moved to McCall, Idaho. He died on May 12, 1974, from complications of emphysema while in hospital in Cascade, Idaho.
