= Frank H. Touret =

American Episcopalian Bishop

The Right Reverend Frank Hale Touret D.D.
- Bishop of Idaho
- Church: Episcopal Church
- Diocese: Idaho
- In office: 1919–1924
- Predecessor: Herman Page
- Successor: Herbert H. H. Fox

Orders
- Ordination: 1904 by William N. McVickar
- Consecration: February 2, 1917 by Daniel S. Tuttle

Personal details
- Born: March 25, 1875 Salem, Massachusetts, United States
- Died: August 2, 1945 (aged 70) Nantucket, Massachusetts, United States
- Denomination: Anglican
- Parents: Benjamin A. Touret & Lucy Marks
- Spouse: Irene Chittenden Farquhar (m. 1906)
- Children: William Chapin Touret

Frank Hale Touret (March 25, 1875 – August 2, 1945) was an American prelate who served as the fourth Missionary Bishop of Idaho from 1919 till 1924.

== Early life and education ==
Touret was born in Salem, Massachusetts on March 25, 1875, the son of Benjamin A. Touret and Lucy Marks. He graduated from Harvard University with a B.A. in 1897 and an M.A. in 1901. He enrolled into the Episcopal Theological seminary and graduated in 1903, after which he was ordained deacon that same year by Bishop William Lawrence of Massachusetts and priest in 1904 by Bishop William N. McVickar of Rhode Island. In 1921 he was awarded a Doctor of Divinity by Whitman College.

== Priesthood ==
Touret served as curate of St John's Church in Providence, Rhode Island until 1904. Then he became curate of Christ Church Detroit. In 1908, he became rector of St Luke's Church in Fort Collins, Colorado and in 1910 he became rector of Grace Church in Colorado Springs, Colorado.

== Bishop ==
Touret was elected as Bishop of Western Colorado in 1916. He was consecrated on February 2, 1917, by Presiding Bishop Daniel S. Tuttle. In 1919 he was elected missionary Bishop of Idaho, a post he held till 1924, when he resigned due to ill health. Touet also served as acting Bishop of Utah from 1917 till 1919, after its bishop, Paul Jones, was forced to resign and take a leave of absence due to his opposition to WWI. In 1926, Touret became rector of the Church of the Good Shepherd in Waban, Massachusetts. He retired in 1929 due to his poor health. Touret died of a heart attack in Nantucket, Massachusetts on August 2, 1945.

== Family ==
Touret was married to Irene Chittenden Farquhar and together had one son.
