= Frederick B. Bartlett =

American Episcopalian Bishop

The Right Reverend Frederick Bethune Bartlett D.D.
- Bishop of Idaho
- Church: Episcopal Church
- Diocese: Idaho
- In office: 1935–1941
- Predecessor: Middleton S. Barnwell
- Successor: Frank A. Rhea
- Previous post: Bishop of North Dakota (1931–1935)

Orders
- Ordination: October 23, 1908 by Charles Scadding
- Consecration: December 16, 1931 by Hugh L. Burleson

Personal details
- Born: August 23, 1882 Manchester, Connecticut, United States
- Died: December 15, 1941 (aged 59) American Falls, Idaho, United States
- Denomination: Anglican
- Parents: Bethune James Bartlett & Elizabeth Johnson
- Spouse: Jessie Langelle Hale (m. 1911)
- Children: 1

Frederick Bethune Bartlett (August 23, 1882 – December 15, 1941) was an American prelate who served as the eighth Bishop of Idaho from 1935 till 1941.

== Early life and education ==
Bartlett was born on August 23, 1882, in Manchester, Connecticut, the son of Bethune James Bartlett and Elizabeth Johnson. In 1904 he graduated with a Bachelor of Arts from Trinity College, Connecticut. Year later, in 1932, he was awarded the Doctor of Divinity by the same college. He enrolled in the Episcopal Theological Seminary and graduated with a Bachelor of Divinity in 1908. In 1911 he graduated with a Master of Arts from Harvard University.

== Priesthood ==
Bartlett was ordained deacon on June 3, 1908 by Bishop Chauncey B. Brewster of Connecticut and priest that same year on October 23 by Charles Scadding, Bishop of Oregon. His first post was as a missionary priest in Grants Pass, Oregon. In 1911 he became vicar of Christ Chapel in Brooklyn, New York City. In 1917 he transferred to West Hoboken, New Jersey, to serve as rector of St John's Church. A year later he became rector of St Mark's Church in Aberdeen, South Dakota, where he remained till 1923 when he became rector of St Philip the Apostle Church in St. Louis, Missouri. In 1925 he was appointed general secretary of the National Council of the Protestant Episcopal Church.

== Bishop ==
Bartlett was elected as Bishop of North Dakota on September 25, 1931. He was consecrated on December 16, 1931, by Hugh L. Burleson of South Dakota. In 1935 he was elected Bishop of Idaho, where he remained till his death in 1941.

== Family ==
Bartlett was married to Jessie Langelle Hale (1887-1940) on October 10, 1911.
