= T.S. Montgomery =

American architect (1917–1970)

Thomas Stuart Montgomery
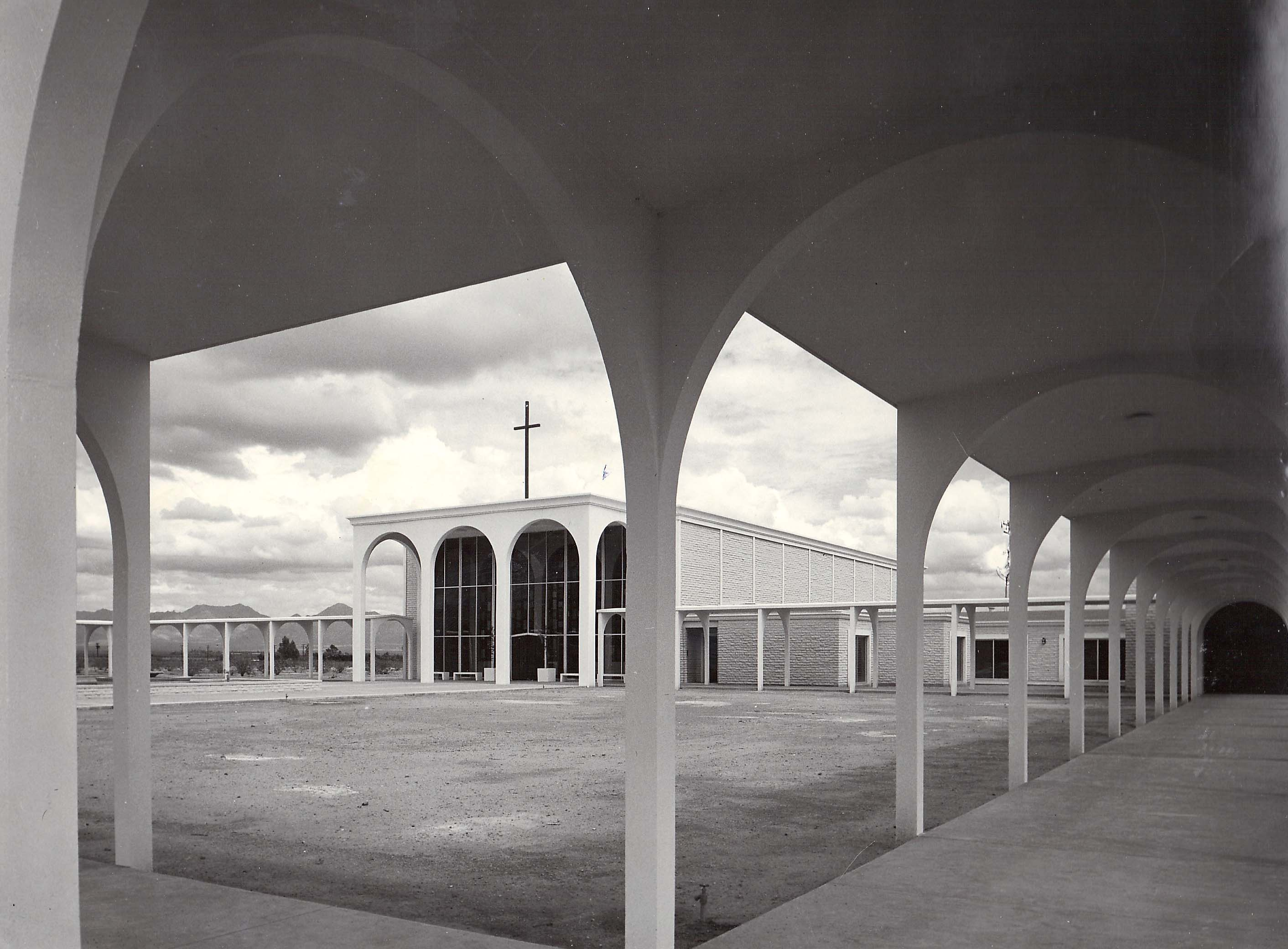
- Saint Barnabas on the Desert
- Born: 1917
- Died: 1970 (aged 52–53)
- Occupation: Architect
- Practice: T. S. Montgomery Architect
- Buildings: Ring Building, Saint Barnabas on the Desert

Thomas Stuart Montgomery (1917-1970) was an American architect working in Washington D.C. and Arizona during the middle 20th century. His offices were located in Old Town Scottsdale and later in downtown Tempe. He is known for designing Saint Barnabas On The Desert Episcopal Church in Paradise Valley.

== Life and career ==
Montgomery was born in 1917. Prior to coming to Arizona, Montgomery was associated with Ring Engineering Co., a Washington-based firm that specialized in multi-story high rise buildings. He served as principal architect for the design of the 12-story Ring Building in Washington. While working for the Ring from he was involved in the design of mini high-rise and garden type apartments in Washington and many other eastern cities. In 1948 he and his family moved to Arizona and settled in Tempe. He established his practice in 1954 and in 1957 moved it from Scottsdale to Tempe. He was commissioned to design Saint Barnabas On The Desert Episcopal Church, completed in 1961. Montgomery continued to design buildings throughout Arizona until his death in 1970.

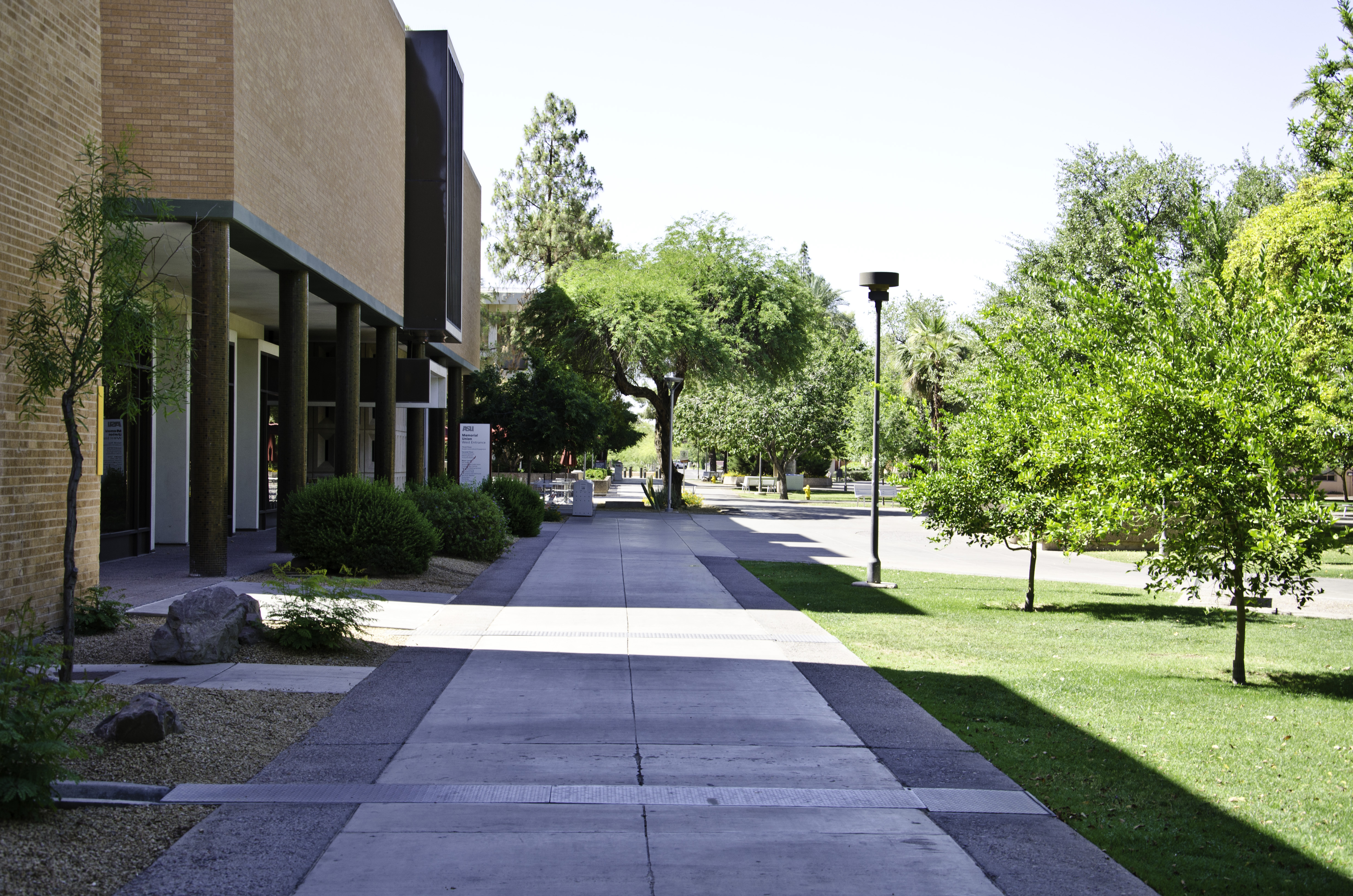
Arizona State University Memorial Union expansion

== Structures ==
Ring Engineering Co.

- 1941 Dorchester House, Washington D.C.
- 1946 Ring Building, Washington D.C.
- 1940s Carlyn Apartment, Washington D.C.

Arizona

- 1951 Montgomery residence, Tempe
- 1955-1958 Craftsman Court (Kiva Plaza) Old Town Scottsdale
- 1955 Glassart Studio, Old Town Scottsdale (now FnB Restaurant)
- 1955-1958 Saint Augustine's Episcopal Church, Tempe
- 1957-1960 Our Lady of Mount Carmel, Tempe
- 1958 Heard Museum gallery and classroom buildings, Phoenix
- 1958 Loma Vista Apartments, Scottsdale
- c.1958 Telephone Exchange Building, Sedona
- 1959 Westinghouse Electric Corporation manufacturing building, Phoenix
- 1960 Saint Paul's Episcopal Church, Phoenix
- 1960-1961 Saint Barnabas On The Desert Episcopal Church, Paradise Valley
- 1962 Delta Sigma Phi House, Arizona State University, Tempe (Demolished)
- 1962 First Church of Christ Scientist, Scottsdale
- 1962 Saint Paul's Episcopal Church, Yuma
- 1964 Orangewood Presbyterian Church, Phoenix
- 1964 Sanctuary addition to Scottsdale United Methodist Church
- 1964 Parish Hall addition to St Barnabas On The Desert
- 1965 Physical Education East, Arizona State University, Tempe
- 1965 Church of the Master Presbyterian, Mesa
- c.1965 Saint Peter's Lutheran Church, Mesa
- 1966 Prince of Peace Lutheran Church, Phoenix
- 1966 Trinity Methodist Church, Phoenix
- 1966 Glendale Bath Houses, Glendale
- 1967 Scottsdale Baptist Church, Scottsdale (now New Life Community Church)
- 1969 Tempe Cultural Center (site plan)
- 1970 expansion to Memorial Union, Arizona State University Tempe
