= Christ Chapel (Boise, Idaho) =

Historic church in Idaho, United States

- U.S. National Register of Historic Places
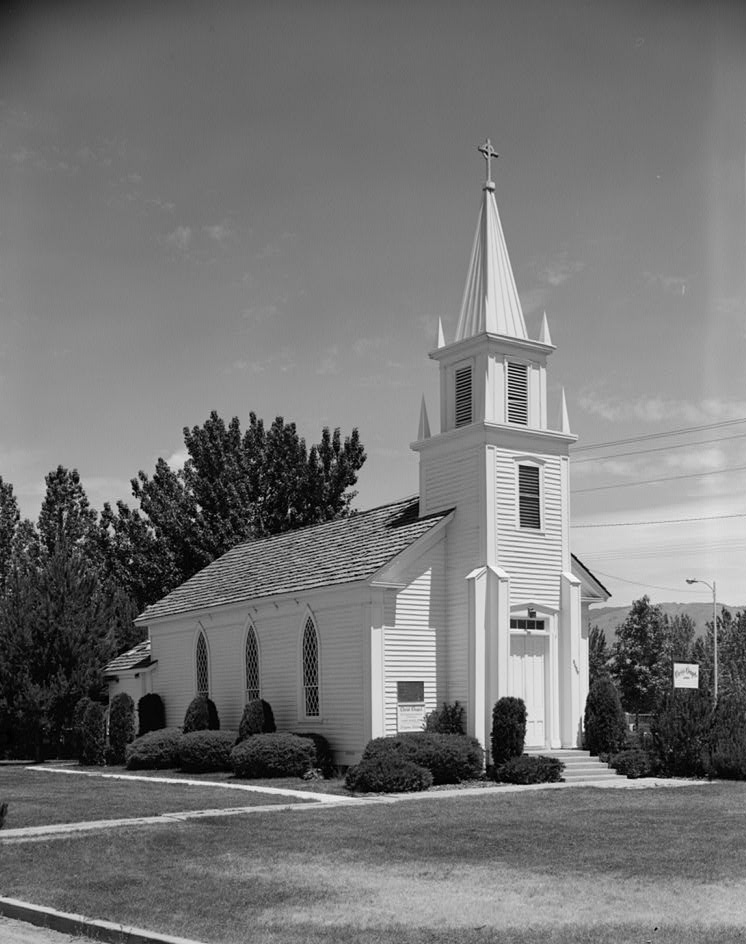

- Location within Idaho Location within the United States
- Location: Broadway at Campus Dr., Boise, Idaho
- Coordinates: 43°36′11.1″N 116°11′38.2″W
- Area: less than one acre
- Built: 1866
- Architectural style: Gothic Revival
- NRHP reference No.: 74000726
- Added to NRHP: July 17, 1974

Christ Chapel (formerly St. Michael's Episcopal Church) is a historic chapel on Broadway at Campus Drive in Boise, Idaho on the campus of Boise State University. It is one of the oldest church buildings in the state.

The Gothic Revival building was constructed in 1866 as St. Michael's Episcopal Church. In addition to serving as a church, the building was used as a school house for St. Margaret's School, which was founded in 1892. St. Margaret's School eventually became Boise Junior College (now Boise State University) in 1932. In 1963 the Christ Chapel Historical Society was founded to restore Christ Chapel and move it to the Boise State University campus, where it remains today. The chapel was added to the National Register of Historic Places in 1974 and is often used for weddings today. The Historical Society continues to own the building.

== See also ==
- List of the oldest churches in the United States
- Boise State University
