= David Birney (bishop) =

The Right Reverend David Bell Birney IV D.D.
- Bishop of Idaho
- Church: Episcopal Church
- Diocese: Idaho
- Elected: February 27, 1982
- In office: 1982–1989
- Predecessor: Hanford L. King Jr.
- Successor: John S. Thornton
- Other post: Assistant Bishop of Massachusetts (1989-1993)

Orders
- Ordination: December 17, 1955 by J. Thomas Heistand
- Consecration: August 7, 1982 by John Allin

Personal details
- Born: November 26, 1929 New Orleans, Louisiana, United States
- Died: February 13, 2004 (aged 74) Danville, Kentucky, United States
- Buried: The Woodlands (Philadelphia)
- Denomination: Anglican
- Parents: David Bell Birney & Stella Walshe
- Spouse: Virginia F. Knorr (m. 1968)
- Children: 2

David Bell Birney IV (November 26, 1929 – February 13, 2004) was twelfth bishop of the Episcopal Diocese of Idaho.

== Early life and education ==
Birney was born on November 26, 1929, in New Orleans, Louisiana, the son of David Bell Birney III (1900-1938) and Stella Walshe Birney (1905-1995). He grew up in Pennsylvania and was educated at the J.P. McCaskey High School and Lancaster Country Day School in Lancaster, Pennsylvania and later at Emerson College in Boston. He studied at the Franklin and Marshall College from which he graduated with a B.A. in 1952. He also studied at the Virginia Theological Seminary.

== Ordained ministry ==
After he was ordained deacon, Birney became curate of St John's Church in York, Pennsylvania. He was ordained priest on December 17, 1955, by Bishop J. Thomas Heistand of Harrisburg. Later he became rector of All Saints' Church in Hanover, Pennsylvania and then rector of the Church of the Mediator in Allentown, Pennsylvania. In 1969 he became a missionary in the Church of Uganda, where he served till 1972 as a tutor at the Bishop Tucker Theological College. In 1972 he went as a missionary in Botswana, where he remained till 1975. Between 1976 and 1982 he served as coordinator of oversees missionary work of the Episcopal Church and a member of the board of the National Hunger Committee of the Presiding Bishop's Fund for World Relief.

== Episcopacy ==
Birney was elected Bishop of Idaho on February 27, 1982, during a special convention which took place in All Saints' Church in Boise, Idaho. He was consecrated on August 7, 1982, by Presiding Bishop John Allin as chief consecrator in the Roman Catholic Cathedral of St John in Boise, Idaho. He remained in Idaho till 1989, after he retired. From 1989 till 1993 he served as Assistant Bishop of Massachusetts. He died on February 13, 2004.

== Family ==
Birney was married to Virginia F. Knorr and together they had two sons.
