= Hanford L. King Jr. =

American Episcopal bishop

The Right Reverend Hanford Langdon King PhD
- Bishop of Idaho
- Church: Episcopal Church
- Diocese: Idaho
- Elected: January 8, 1972
- In office: 1972–1981
- Predecessor: Norman L. Foote
- Successor: David Birney

Orders
- Ordination: July 1946 (deacon); March 1, 1947 (priest) by William Appleton Lawrence
- Consecration: May 3, 1972 by John E. Hines

Personal details
- Born: September 18, 1921 Worcester, Massachusetts, United States
- Died: October 11, 1986 (aged 65) Boise, Idaho, United States
- Denomination: Anglican
- Parents: Hanford Langdon King & Hephizibah Vernon Hopkins
- Spouse: Helen Rosendahl Knospe (m. 1947)
- Children: 3

Hanford Langdon King Jr. (September 18, 1921 – October 11, 1986) was bishop of the Episcopal Diocese of Idaho from 1972 to 1982.

== Early life and education ==
King was born on September 18, 1921, in Worcester, Massachusetts, the son of Hanford Langdon King Sr. (1897-1983) and Hephzibah Vernon Hopkins (1895-1975). In 1943 he graduated with a Bachelor of Arts from Clark University. He also studied at the Episcopal Theological Seminary from which he graduated with a Bachelor of Sacred Theology in 1946. He received a Doctor of Philosophy from Columbia University in 1950.

== Priest ==
King was ordained deacon in July 1946 after which he served as assistant of St James' Church in New York City. In March 1947, he was ordained priest and became rector of the Church of the Mediator in the Bronx, post he retained till 1950. In 1951 he became rector of St James' Church in Bozeman, Montana, and in 1960 he transferred to Rapid City, South Dakota, to become rector of Emmanuel Church. He also served as a deputy to the General Convention between 1958 and 1964 and in 1970.

== Bishop ==
King was elected Bishop of Idaho on January 8, 1972. He was consecrated on May 3, 1972, with Presiding Bishop John E. Hines as chief consecrator. He retained that post till 1981. King died a few years later on October 11, 1986.

== Personal life ==
King married Helen Rosendahl Knospe on May 31, 1947, and together they had three children. In 1962, King was certified as a professional ski instructor.
