= St. Alphonsus' Hospital Nurses' Home and Heating Plant/Laundry =

Two buildings in Boise Idaho (e. 1921)

- U.S. National Register of Historic Places
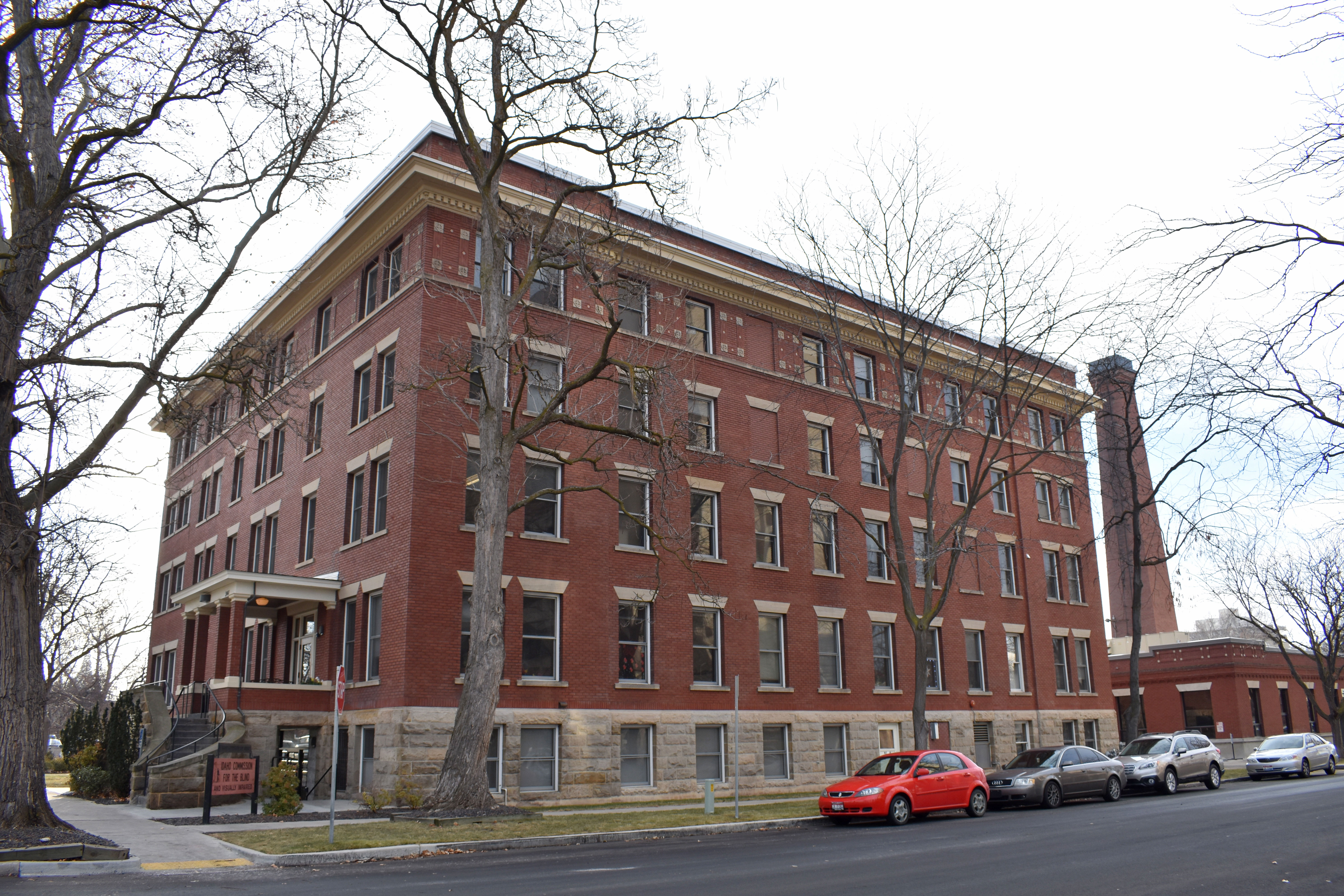
- The nurses' home and heating plant in 2019

- Location within Idaho Location within the United States
- Location: N. 4th St. between Washington and State Sts., Boise, Idaho
- Coordinates: 43°37′00″N 116°11′39″W
- Area: less than one acre
- Built: 1920
- Architect: Tourtellotte & Hummel; Multiple
- MPS: Tourtellotte and Hummel Architecture TR
- NRHP reference No.: 82000244
- Added to NRHP: November 17, 1982

The St. Alphonsus' Hospital Nurses' Home and Heating Plant/Laundry in Boise, Idaho, are two buildings designed by architects Tourtellotte and Hummel in 1920 and completed in 1921. Included are a 4-story, brick and sandstone residence for nurses and a 1-story, brick and sandstone heating plant which supplied not only the residence but St. Alphonsus Hospital (demolished) and St. Teresa's Academy (demolished). The site was added to the National Register of Historic Places in 1982.

The nursing staff at St. Alphonsus Hospital was affiliated with Sisters of the Holy Cross, and many nurses had taken vows of celibacy and poverty, hence a need for residential provisions.

== Nurses' Home ==
The building included a reception room and parlor, library, lecture hall, swimming pool, gymnasium, two sun porches and three sleeping porches. A superintendent's apartment and 75 bedrooms, three with private bath, were constructed on the first through fourth floors. The basement included two dining rooms, a kitchen, and a pantry. The building accommodated 100 nurses and student nurses.

Both the residence and the heating plant were later acquired by the State of Idaho. The nurses' home was converted to office space for the Idaho Commission for the Blind and Visually Impaired, and the heating plant became a storage space.

== See also ==
- St. Alphonsus Liguori
- List of hospitals in Idaho
- National Register of Historic Places listings in Ada County, Idaho
