= John S. Thornton =

American Episcopal bishop (born 1932)

The Right Reverend John S. Thornton
- Bishop of Idaho
- Church: Episcopal Church
- Diocese: Idaho
- Elected: 1990
- In office: 1990–1998
- Predecessor: David Birney (bishop)
- Successor: Harry Brown Bainbridge III

Orders
- Ordination: 1962
- Consecration: September 1, 1990 by Bill Stough

Personal details
- Born: 1932 (age 93–94)
- Denomination: Anglican
- Spouse: Janylee Thornton

John Stuart Thornton (born 1932) was bishop of the Episcopal Diocese of Idaho, serving from 1990 to 1998. He was consecrated on September 1, 1990.

== Biography ==
Thornton was initially ordained a minister in the Congregational Church, the present day United Church of Christ. He joined the Episcopal Church in 1960. Ordained deacon and priest in the Episcopal Diocese of Wyoming in 1962, he served as curate of St. Peter's Church in Sheridan. In 1964, he was called to be rector of Christ Church in Sausalito, California, and, in 1969, was called to be rector of St. Stephen's Church in Belvedere-Tiburon, California. In 1982, he and his wife, Jan, moved to a small farm near Scio, Oregon, from which he served as vicar of Christ the King on the Santiam in Stayton.

In 1990, he was elected bishop of the Episcopal Diocese of Idaho and retired in 1998. While serving as bishop, he founded St. Francis of the Tetons in the Teton Valley of Idaho and Wyoming. In 1997, he and his wife founded the Lillian Vallely School, a day school for children living on the Fort Hall Reservation in eastern Idaho.

In his retirement, Thornton has written four books and served churches in Arizona, Idaho, North Dakota, Oregon, and Washington.
