= Robert B. Landry =

United States Air Force general (1909–2000)

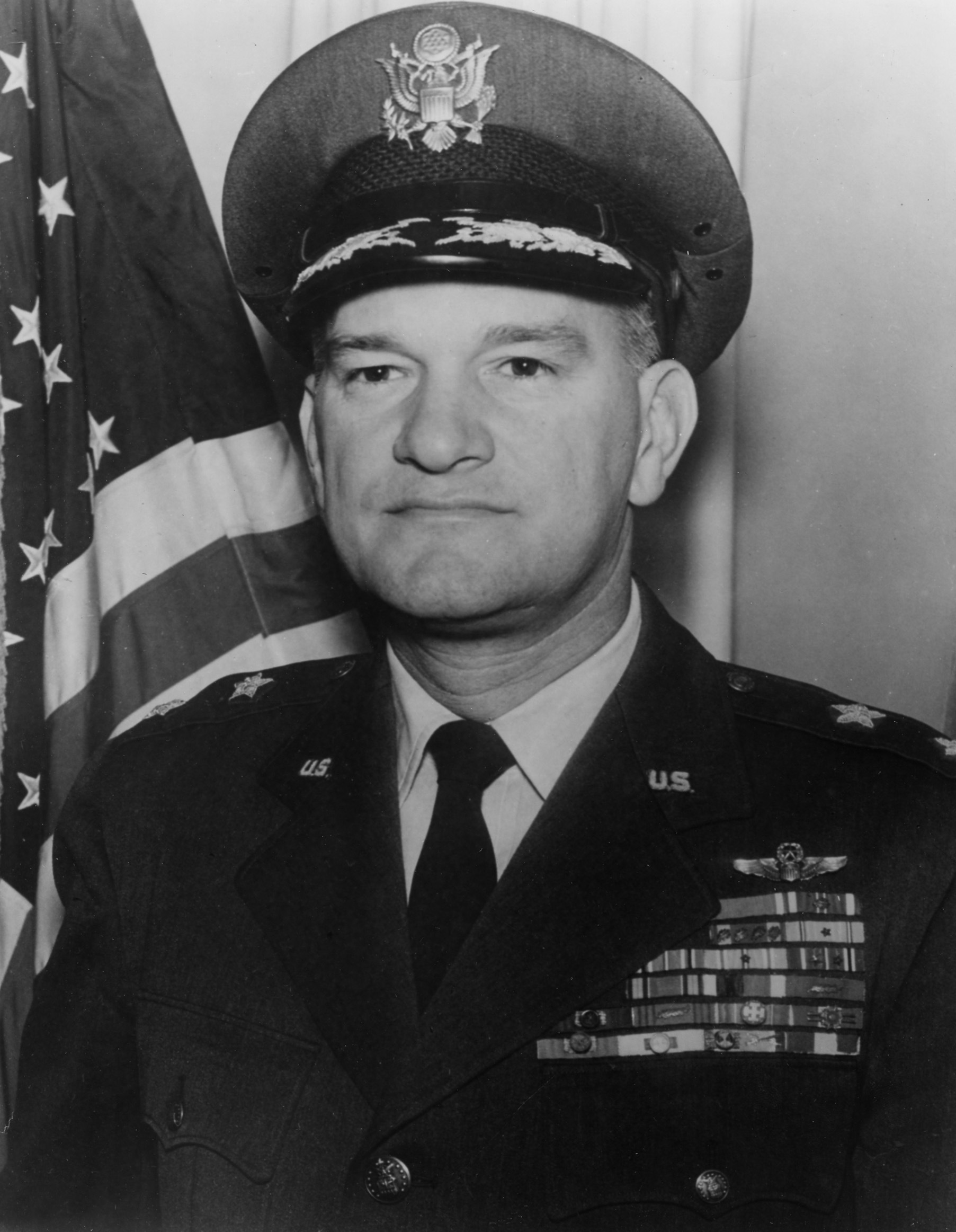
- Born: 1 December 1909; New Orleans, Louisiana, US
- Died: 14 July 2000 (aged 90); Scottsdale, Arizona, US
- Burial place: Saint Barnabas on the Desert, Paradise Valley, Arizona
- Military career
- Allegiance: United States
- Branch: United States Army (1932–1947); United States Air Force (1947–1962)
- Service years: 1932–1962
- Rank: Major General
- Commands: 56th Fighter Group; 493rd Bombardment Group; Fourth Air Force; Sacramento Air Materiel Area
- Conflicts: World War II; European Air Offensive; Normandy; Northern France; Ardennes-Alsace; Rhineland; Central Europe
- Awards: Legion of Merit; Distinguished Flying Cross (2); Air Medal (5); Commander of the Order of the Crown (Belgium); Croix de guerre (Belgium); Croix de Guerre 1939–1945 (France); Order of Orange Nassau (Netherlands); Presidential Medal of Merit (Nicaragua); Bernardo O'Higgins Medal (Chile); Abdon Calderón Medal (Ecuador)

Robert Broussard Landry (1 December 1909 – 14 July 2000) was a major general in the United States Air Force (USAF). A graduate of the United States Military Academy at West Point class of 1932, he flew 32 combat missions in Europe during World War II as a fighter and bomber pilot. He was the USAF aide to the President of the United States, Harry S. Truman, from 1948 to 1953. In this role he represented the Air Force at the White House and advised the president on Air Force matters. He retired from the Air Force in 1962 and died at the age of 90.

== Early life ==
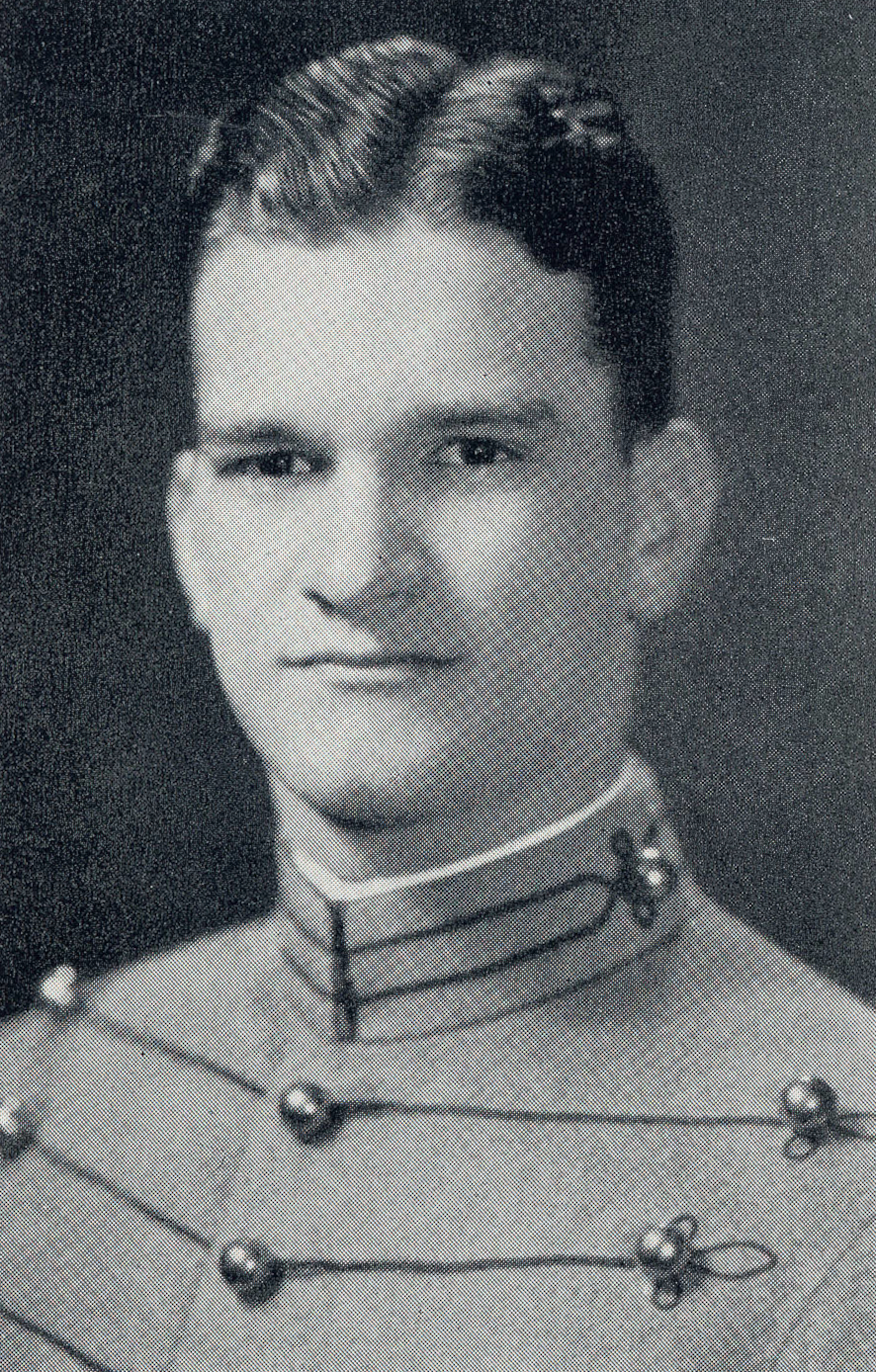
Landry as a West Point cadet in 1932

Robert Broussard Landry was born in New Orleans, Louisiana, on 1 December 1909, the son of Luke Valcour Landry and his wife Josephine née Scharpe. He was a direct descendant of Pierre Joseph Landry, who served as a captain in the Louisiana Militia during the War of 1812. He had a brother, Ernest Scharpe Landry, and a sister, Val Louise, who later married Milton Summerfelt.

In 1927, Landry graduated from Jesuit High School and entered Tulane University, intending to become a mechanical and electrical engineer. He was a Kappa Sigma. In 1928, his father secured him a second alternative appointment to the United States Military Academy at West Point, New York, through Senator Edwin S. Broussard. (He was named after the Senator's brother Robert F. Broussard.) The Senator's principal candidate and the first alternative failed to qualify, and Landry was given the appointment.

Landry entered West Point on 2 July 1928. His roommate was Robert Lee Scott Jr. Landry played football, baseball, basketball and tennis. He graduated on 10 June 1932, ranked 217th in his class, and was commissioned as a second lieutenant in the Infantry. He married Mildred Marie Rosa Plauche on 15 August 1932; they had seven children. His first posting was to Camp Stephen D. Little, Arizona, with the African-American 25th Infantry, from 31 August to 28 December 1932, when he moved to Fort Huachuca, Arizona.

In 1934, Landry volunteered for the United States Army Air Corps. He received his pilot rating at Kelly Field, Texas, from which he graduated in February 1935. He transferred to the Air Corps on 20 March 1935 and was assigned to the 16th Pursuit Group at Albrook Field in the Panama Canal Zone. He returned to the United States in 1937 and was assigned to the 20th Pursuit Group at Barksdale Field, Louisiana. On 28 July 1938, he became aide-de-camp to Brigadier General Frederick L. Martin, the commanding general of the 3rd Wing at Barksdale Field, and he continued in this role when Martin was promoted and assumed command of the Hawaiian Air Force at Fort Shafter in the Territory of Hawaii, with the rank of major as of 22 July 1941.

== World War II ==
After the Japanese attack on Pearl Harbor on 7 December 1941, Landry became the executive officer of the Hawaiian Interceptor Command at Honolulu, which soon became the VII Interceptor Command, and then the VII Fighter Command. In April 1942, he transferred to the newly formed Eighth Air Force as the Assistant Chief of Staff, A-3 (Operations), of the VIII Fighter Command, and then chief of its Combat Operations Division from 1 January to 29 October 1943. He commanded the 56th Fighter Group from 30 October 1943 to 12 January 1944. He was then Assistant Chief of Staff, A-3 (Operations) for fighters of the Eighth Air Force until 26 November 1944. He was promoted to lieutenant colonel on 23 January 1942, and colonel on 29 December 1942. For his services, he was awarded the Distinguished Flying Cross with an oak leaf cluster and the Air Medal with four oak leaf clusters.

Switching to bombers, Landry was executive officer of the 93rd Combat Bombardment Wing from 27 November 1944 to 14 February 1945 and commanded the 493rd Bombardment Group from 15 February to 6 June 1945. He was also the acting commander of the 93rd Combat Bombardment Wing from 14 to 29 March 1945. On 7 June he became the Assistant Chief of Staff, A-3 (Operations), on the air staff of the Supreme Headquarters Allied Expeditionary Force (SHAEF) at Frankfurt, Germany. He subsequently served as an air advisor to the Theater General Board. While in the European theater during World War II he flew 32 combat missions in P-47 fighters and Boeing B-17 Flying Fortress bombers.

== Post-war ==
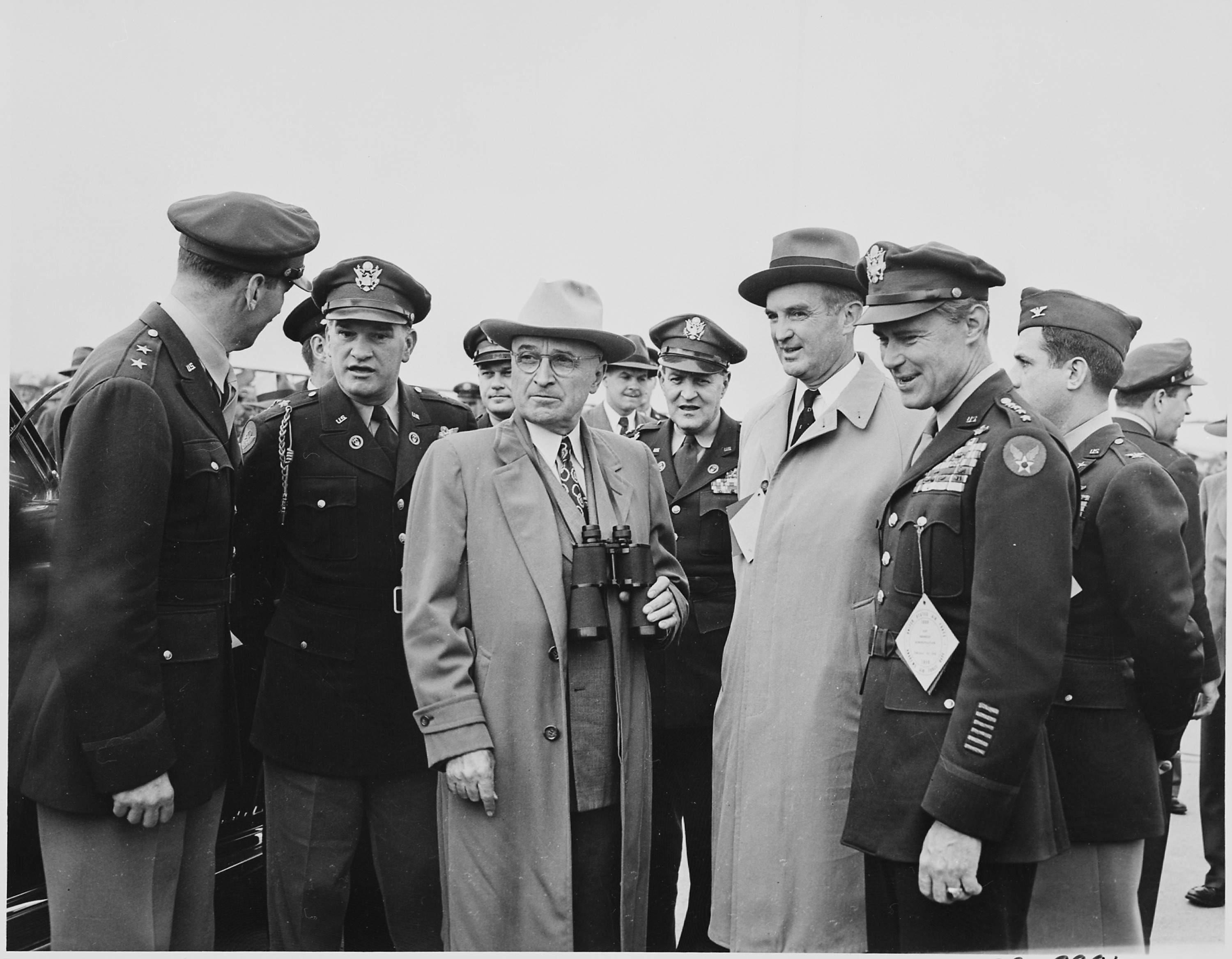
President Harry S. Truman (with binoculars) with Landry (second from left), Major General Harry H. Vaughan, the Secretary of the Air Force Stuart Symington, and the Chief of Staff of the Air Force, General Hoyt Vandenberg

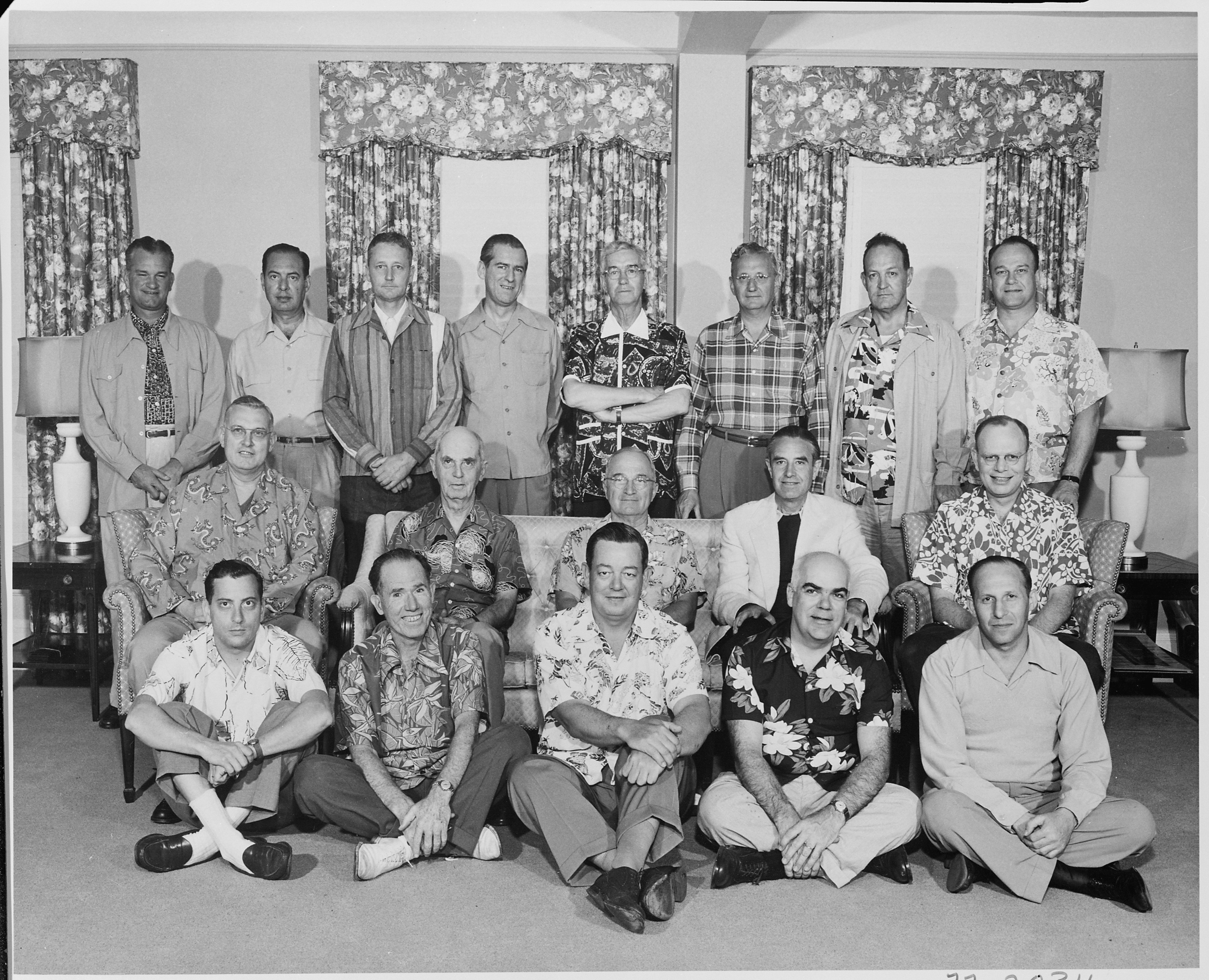
President Harry S. Truman with members of his official party (many attired in Hawaiian shirts), on vacation in Key West, Florida. Landry in is the back row, on the left

Landry returned to the United States, where he was a member of the Joint Operations Review Board at the Army and Navy Staff College from 1 January to 30 June 1946. He then became an instructor at the National War College in Washington, D.C., from 1 July 1946 to 30 June 1947. He was executive officer to the chief of staff, Headquarters United States Air Force (USAF) from 1 August 1947 to 4 February 1948. On 5 February, he became the USAF aide to the president of the United States, Harry S. Truman, with the rank of brigadier general from 23 December 1948, and major general from 8 March 1952. In this role he represented the Air Force at the White House and advised the president on Air Force matters.

After Truman left office in 1953, Landry returned to Barksdale Air Force Base as the deputy commander of the Strategic Air Command's Second Air Force. On 1 February 1955, he assumed command of the Fourth Air Force at Hamilton Air Force Base, California. He then became Assistant Deputy Chief of Staff of the Air Force for Personnel on 1 July 1957. His final assignment, from June 1960 to June 1962, was as commander of the Sacramento Air Materiel Area. He retired on 1 June 1962, after thirty years of service. In that time, he had 7,500 hours flying time.

Landry died in Scottsdale, Arizona, on 14 July 2000 and was buried in Saint Barnabas on the Desert Memorial Garden in Paradise Valley, Arizona. His papers are in the Harry S. Truman Presidential Library and Museum.

== Military decorations ==
Legion of Merit
Distinguished Flying Cross with oak leaf cluster
Air Medal with four oak leaf clusters
American Defense Service Medal
American Campaign Medal
European-African-Middle Eastern Campaign Medal with six campaign stars
Asiatic-Pacific Campaign Medal
World War II Victory Medal
Army of Occupation Medal with "Germany" clasp
Commander of the Order of the Crown (Belgium)
Croix de guerre 1939–1945 with palm (Belgium)
Croix de guerre 1939–1945 with palm (France)

== Dates of rank ==
Insignia	Rank	Component	Date	References
	Second lieutenant	Infantry	10 June 1932	
	Second lieutenant	Air Corps	1 March 1934	
	First lieutenant (temporary)	Air Corps	28 June 1935	
	First lieutenant	Infantry	1 August 1935	
	Captain	Army of the United States	9 September 1940	
	Major (temporary)	Army of the United States	22 July 1941	
	Lieutenant colonel (temporary)	Army of the United States	23 January 1942	
	Captain	Air Corps	10 June 1942	
	Lieutenant colonel	Army of the United States	15 October 1942	
	Colonel	Army of the United States	29 December 1942	
	Colonel	United States Air Force	2 April 1948	
	Brigadier general (temporary)	United States Air Force	23 December 1948	
	Major general (temporary)	United States Air Force	8 March 1952	
