= Attorney General Landry =

Attorney General Landry may refer to:

- Jeff Landry (born 1970), Attorney General of Louisiana
- Ross Landry, Attorney General of Nova Scotia
