= Bingham Memorial Hospital =

Coordinates: 43.19334°N 112.3467°W

Bingham Memorial Hospital Bingham

Geography
- Location: Blackfoot, Idaho, Bingham County, Idaho, United States

History
- Founded: 1950

Links
- Website: binghammemorial.org
- Lists: Hospitals in the United States

Bingham Memorial Hospital is a hospital in Bingham County, Idaho, United States, that was established in 1950.

== History ==
In 1927, the people of Bingham County started planning to build a community hospital. On 19 August 1950, after extensive planning and 23 years of fund raising, the 60-bed hospital was opened. The funds included those under the Hill–Burton Act, and the total cost was $537,000. At that time it was a county general hospital; on 1 July 2007, it was turned into a non-profit (c)3 health care unit.

The Bingham Health care foundation is responsible for the collection and raise of funds for BMH. Its independent non-profit organization status makes it able to apply for federal and private funding and resources. The money is raised through individual or public donations, grant writing, employee payroll deduction program, annual mass mailing and special events.

== Facilities ==
The hospital has grown from a 60 beds health care unit to a medical facility with over 500 employees. The hospital treats almost 1500 patients every year. An average of 2400 operations are conducted at BMH each year and 18,000 medical procedures are successfully administered. According to the well maintained hospital records, 8700 people were admitted in the emergency room last year. The hospital is constantly growing and its impact in the region is commendable.

The hospital started with a staff of only six doctors. Today, it has a team of over 100 physicians, along with several facilities and specialized departments. The hospital specializes in:

- Cardiology
- Dermatology
- Orthopaedics
- Diabetes Care
- Endocrinology
- Family Medicine
- Mental Health and Nephrology
- Neurology and Neuro Surgery
- Rural Health
- Oncology
- Pain relief
- Plastic Surgery
- Sports Medicine
- Pulmonology
- Podiatry.

== Partnerships ==
Bingham Memorial Hospital (BMH) has entered into partnership with several other institutions to enhance their own workforce and capabilities. They include:

- 1st choice urgent care.
- Idaho Doctor's Hospital.
- Bingham Cardiology and Dermatology
- Idaho Neurosciences Centre, Kidney Centre, Pain Group, Physician's Clinic.
- Bingham Memorial Surgical Team, Medicine Team, Women's health care centre.
- Blackfoot Orthopaedic centre etc.

== Hospital rating data ==
The HealthGrades website contains the latest quality data for Bingham Memorial Hospital, as of 2015. For this rating section three different types of data from HealthGrades are presented: quality ratings for nine inpatient conditions and procedures, thirteen patient safety indicators, percentage of patients giving the hospital a 9 or 10 (the two highest possible ratings).

For inpatient conditions and procedures, there are three possible ratings: worse than expected, as expected, better than expected. For Bingham Memorial Hospital the data for this category is:

- Worse than expected - 2
- As expected - 7
- Better than expected - 0

For patient safety indicators, there are the same three possible ratings. For this hospital four indicators were rated as:

- Worse than expected - 0
- As expected - 13
- Better than expected - 0

Data for patients giving this hospital a 9 or 10 are:

- Patients rating this hospital as a 9 or 10 - 72%
- Patients rating hospitals as a 9 or 10 nationally - 69%
