= James Bowen Funsten =

American bishop (1856–1918)

The Right Reverend James Bowen Funsten D.D.
- Bishop of Idaho
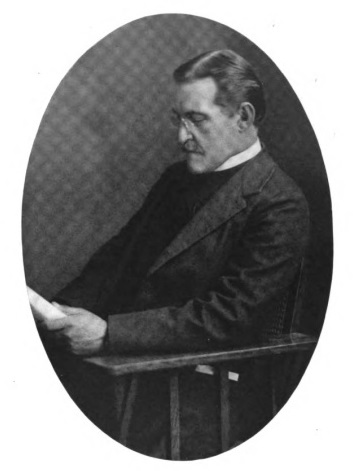
- Church: Episcopal Church
- Diocese: Idaho
- Elected: 1899
- In office: 1899–1918
- Predecessor: Ethelbert Talbot
- Successor: Herman Page

Orders
- Ordination: 1883 by George William Peterkin
- Consecration: July 13, 1899 by Daniel S. Tuttle

Personal details
- Born: July 23, 1856 Clarke County, Virginia, United States
- Died: December 2, 1918 (aged 62) Boise, Idaho, United States
- Buried: Hollywood Cemetery (Richmond, Virginia)
- Denomination: Anglican
- Parents: Oliver Ridgeway Funsten & Mary Bowen
- Spouse: Ida Vivian Pratt (m. 1886)
- Children: 4

James Bowen Funsten (July 23, 1856 - December 2, 1918) was the third bishop of the Episcopal Diocese of Idaho, serving from 1898 to 1918.

== Biography ==
He was born near Winchester, Virginia to Col. Oliver Ridgeway Funsten, and Mary Funsten (née Bowen). He graduated from the Virginia Military Institute in 1875. He later graduated with a Bachelor of Laws from the University of Virginia in 1878 and practiced law afterwards. He also studied at the Virginia Theological Seminary from which he graduated in 1882. He was ordained deacon in 1882 and priest in 1883.

He was elected Bishop of Idaho in 1898 and was consecrated on July 13, 1899. On 25 May 1902 he and the Rev. Charles Deuel dedicated St. Michael's Cathedral with an overflowing crowd of 500 in attendance. Six months later he founded St. Luke's Hospital inside a cottage with six beds. Now known as St. Luke's Medical Center, it is the only Idaho-based, not-for-profit health system.
