= Episcopal Diocese of Idaho =

Diocese of the Episcopal Church in the United States

Coordinates: 43°37′08″N 116°11′59″W

Diocese of Idaho

Location
- Country: United States
- Territory: South Idaho
- Ecclesiastical province: Province VIII

Statistics
- Congregations: 27 (2025)
- Members: 2,933 (2025)

Information
- Rite: Episcopal
- Established: December 9, 1967
- Cathedral: St Michael's Cathedral

Current leadership
- Bishop: Jos Tharakan

Map
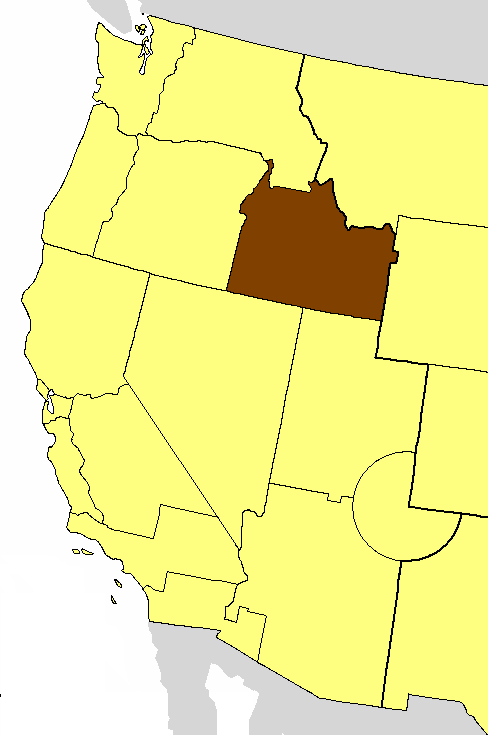
- Location of the Diocese of Idaho

Website
- episcopalidaho.org

The Episcopal Diocese of Idaho is the diocese of the Episcopal Church in the United States of America, with jurisdiction over Idaho south of the Salmon River, and one congregation in western Wyoming. Located in Province 8, its cathedral is St. Michael's in Boise, as are the diocesan offices.

Congregations in northern Idaho are part of the Episcopal Diocese of Spokane.

The diocese reported 4,775 members in 2017 and 2,933 members in 2025. Plate and pledge income for the 27 filing congregations of the diocese in 2025 was $3,172,345. Average Sunday attendance (ASA) for 2025 was 961 persons, a relative decrease from 1,437 in 2015.

== List of bishops ==
The bishops of Idaho have been:

1. Daniel S. Tuttle, (1867–1887)
2. Ethelbert Talbot, (1887–1898),
3. James Bowen Funsten, (1899–1918)
4. Herman Page, (1919 - 1919)
5. Frank H. Touret, (1919–1924)
6. Herbert H. H. Fox, (1925–1926)
7. Middleton S. Barnwell, (1926–1935)
8. Frederick B. Bartlett, (1935–1941)
9. Frank A. Rhea, (1942–1957)
10. Norman L. Foote, (1957–1972)
11. Hanford L. King, Jr. (1972–1981)
12. David B. Birney, IV, (1982–1989)
13. John S. Thornton (1990–1998)
14. Harry Brown Bainbridge, III (1998–2008)
15. Brian J. Thom (2008–2022)
16. Jos Tharakan (2022-Present)

== See also ==
- List of Succession of Bishops for the Episcopal Church, USA
- Roman Catholic Diocese of Boise
