= St. Michael's Episcopal Cathedral (Boise, Idaho) =

Historic church in Idaho, United States

Coordinates: 43.6188°N 116.2000°W

St. Michael's Cathedral
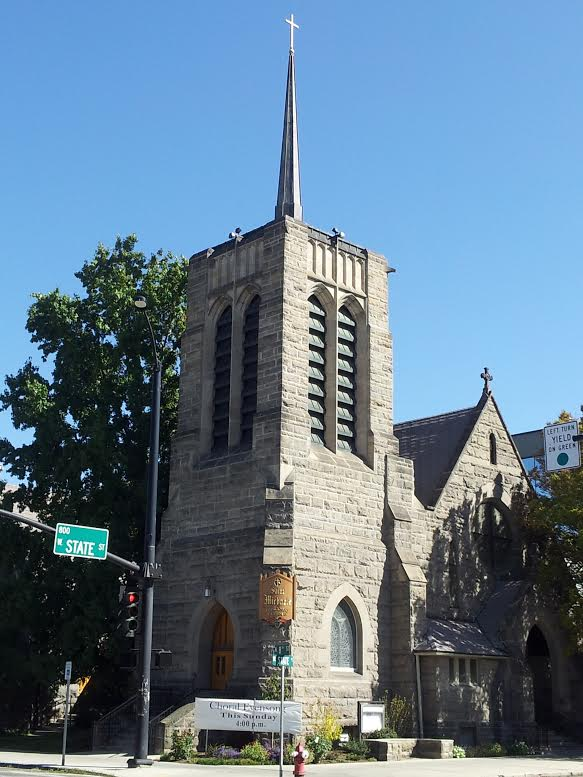
- St. Michael's Cathedral
- Location: Eighth and State Streets; Boise, Idaho
- Country: United States
- Denomination: Episcopal Church in the United States of America
- Website: www.stmichaelscathedral.org

History
- Founded: 1864
- Dedication: Saint Michael the Archangel
- Consecrated: May 25, 1902

Architecture
- Architect: Henry Martyn Congdon
- Style: Gothic Revival
- Completed: 1900

Administration
- Diocese: Idaho

Clergy
- Bishop: The Right Rev. Jos Tharakan
- Dean: The Very Rev. Sean Wall
- St. Michael's Episcopal Cathedral
- U.S. National Register of Historic Places
- U.S. Historic district – Contributing property
- Part of: Boise Capitol Area District
- NRHP reference No.: 76000663
- Added to NRHP: May 12, 1976

St. Michael's Episcopal Cathedral is an Episcopal cathedral in Boise, Idaho, United States. It is the seat of the Diocese of Idaho.

From 2018 to 2025, cathedral membership declined from 1,523 persons to 704 persons. Average Sunday Attendance (ASA) reported by the church in 2025 was 317 persons. This was a relative decrease from ASA of 428 persons reported in 2015.

== History ==
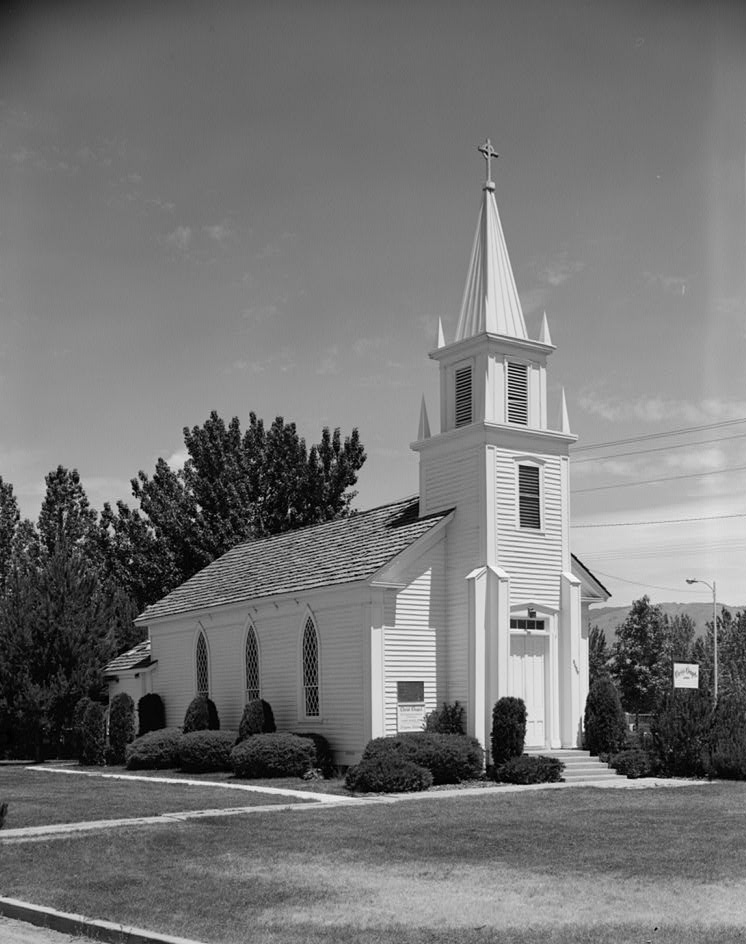
Christ Chapel, the first St. Michael's Church.

The first services of the Episcopal Church were celebrated in Boise in August 1864 and St. Michael's Church was organized that year by the Rev. Saint Michael Fackler. Two years later the first church building was constructed. It was the first Episcopal church in what is now Idaho, Montana and Utah. The building, later renamed Christ Chapel, stands today on the campus of Boise State University. The women's auxiliary staged concerts, dances, and socials and the proceeds went toward the building of the present church building. Construction for the cathedral began on September 7, 1899, and it was completed the following year. The debt was paid off in 1902 and the church was consecrated on May 25 of that year. The Bishop Daniel S. Tuttle House was built in 1907 and it is attached to the church building.

In the past, St. Michael's parishioners supported two other Episcopal institutions in Boise. St. Margaret's Hall, a school for girls, was founded in 1892. Because of the Great Depression, the Rt. Rev. Middleton Barnwell converted the school into Boise Junior College in 1932. The school became independent in 1934 and is now Boise State University. St. Luke's Hospital was founded six months after the cathedral's dedication. It is now run by an independent non-profit board.

The cathedral was included in the Boise Capitol Area District, listed on the National Register of Historic Places in 1976.

== Architecture ==
St. Michael's was designed by prominent New York City church architect Henry Martyn Congdon. Local architect John E. Tourtellotte was the supervising architect. The exterior of the Gothic Revival structure is clad in Boise sandstone, a common building material used on many buildings in the city's early years. The interior features hammerbeam roof trusses. The rose window, known as the Window of the Archangels, was installed in the main facade in 1945. The corner tower, which was part of the original design, was completed in 1949. The transept was added in 1976. The Tiffany window in the east transept was created around 1918. The spire on the tower was added in 1980.

== See also ==
- List of the Episcopal cathedrals of the United States
- List of cathedrals in the United States
- Bishop Funsten House
