= Cathedral of the Rockies =

United Methodist church in Boise, Idaho

Coordinates: 43°37′21″N 116°12′09″W

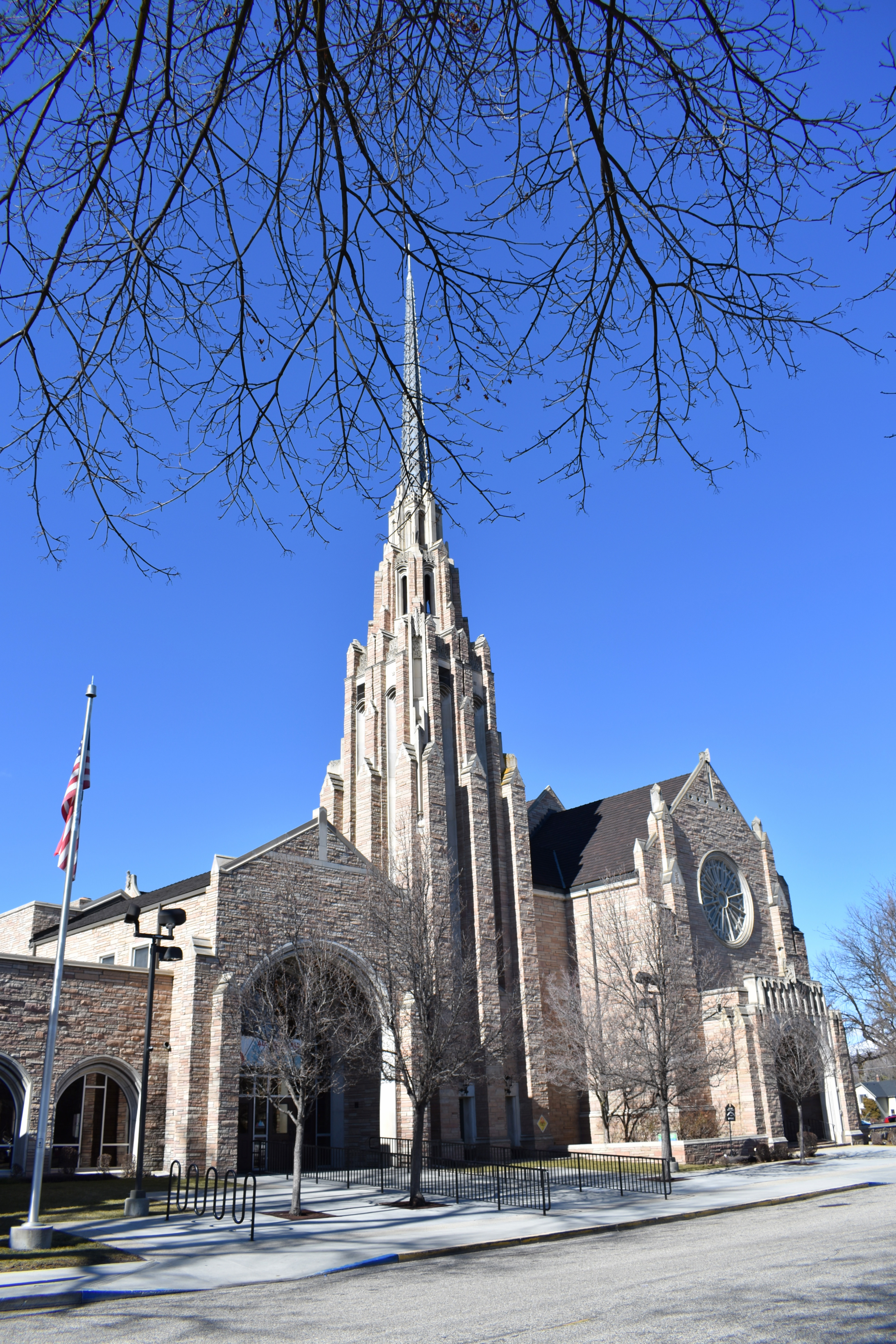
- The Cathedral in 2019

Religion
- Affiliation: United Methodist Church
- Leadership: Rev. Duane Anders
- Year consecrated: 1960
- Status: Active

Location
- Location: 717 N. 11th Street; Boise, Idaho, U.S.
- Interactive map of Cathedral of the Rockies
- Territory: Snake River District; Oregon-Idaho Conference

Architecture
- Architect: Harold E. Wagoner
- Style: Gothic Revival
- Groundbreaking: 1958
- Completed: 1960
- Construction cost: 1960 construction was about $2 million; 2002 expansion was about $9 million
- Materials: Exterior is Arizona flagstone

Website
- cathedraloftherockies.org

Boise First United Methodist Church, more commonly known as the Cathedral of the Rockies, is a United Methodist church located in the historic North End district of Boise, Idaho. The church is the largest United Methodist Church in Boise, the largest in the Oregon-Idaho Conference of the United Methodist Church, and was the first Methodist church in Boise, founded in 1872.

In 1984, the cathedral served as the location for Senator Frank Church's funeral.

In June 2020, the church announced that it would remove its stained-glass window featuring Confederate general Robert E. Lee. The image had been under discussion since 2015 and a decision was made following the murder of George Floyd. The church removed the window and replaced it with a stained-glass window depicting African-American bishop Leontine T. Kelly in 2021.
