= Chandler Sterling =

American bishop

The Right Reverend Chandler Winfield Sterling D.D.
- Bishop of Montana
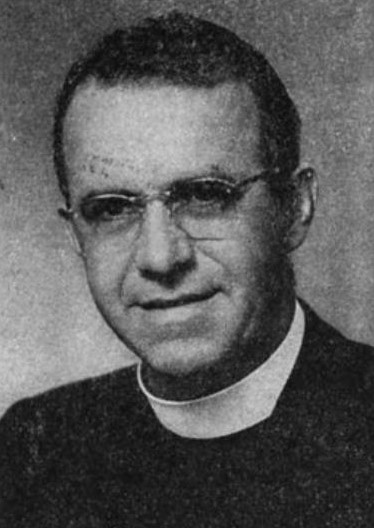
- Church: Episcopal Church
- Diocese: Montana
- In office: 1957–1968
- Predecessor: Henry Hean Daniels
- Successor: Jackson Earle Gilliam
- Previous post: Coadjutor Bishop of Montana (1956-1957)

Orders
- Ordination: December 1938
- Consecration: October 30, 1956 by Henry H. Daniels

Personal details
- Born: January 28, 1911 Montclair, New Jersey, United States
- Died: March 3, 1984 (aged 73) Summit, Waukesha County, Wisconsin, United States
- Buried: Nashotah House Cemetery
- Denomination: Anglican
- Parents: Robert Winfield Sterling & Mary Eleanor Chandler
- Spouse: Catherine Ricker (m. 1935)
- Children: 8
- Education: Northwestern University

Chandler Winfield Sterling (January 28, 1911 – March 3, 1984) was a bishop of Montana in The Episcopal Church.

== Biography ==
Sterling was born on January 28, 1911, in Dixon, Illinois, the Son of Robert Winfield Sterling and Mary Eleanor Chandler. He attended public schools in Dixon and Northwestern University in Evanston, Illinois. He graduated from Seabury-Western Theological Seminary in June 1938 and was ordained deacon that same month. He was ordained priest in December of the same year. On June 17, 1935, he married Catherine L. Ricker with whom he had 8 children.

== Priesthood ==
His first appointment was as curate at St Augustine's Church in Wilmette, Illinois, and Grace Church in Oak Park, Illinois. In 1941 he became rector of St Andrew's Church in Milwaukee and served as locum at Grace Church in Freeport, Illinois, from 1943 till 1944. In 1944 he became rector of Our Savior's Church in Elmhurst, Illinois, a post he held until 1950 when he became rector of Grace Church in Chadron, Nebraska, and was subsequently in charge of the mission in northwest Nebraska. He also served as chairman of the youth commission in the Diocese of Chicago and chairman of the Department for religious education in the Diocese of Nebraska.

== Bishop ==
Stirling was elected Coadjutor Bishop of Montana in May 1956. He was consecrated on October 30, 1956, in St Peter's Pro-Cathedral by Henry Hean Daniels, Bishop of Montana. His co-consecrators were Howard R. Brinker of Nebraska and Joseph Minnis of Colorado. He succeeded as diocesan in 1957, and served until 1968.
