= James D. Warner =

American bishop

The Right Reverend James Daniel Warner D.D.
- Bishop of Nebraska
- Church: Episcopal Church
- Diocese: Nebraska
- Elected: August 27, 1976
- In office: 1976–1989
- Predecessor: Robert Varley
- Successor: James E. Krotz

Orders
- Ordination: October 3, 1953 by Harwood Sturtevant
- Consecration: November 30, 1976 by John Allin

Personal details
- Born: May 1, 1924 Sheridan, Wyoming, United States
- Died: September 9, 2009 (aged 85)
- Denomination: Anglican
- Parents: Stephan Daniel Warner & Grace Margaret Caple
- Spouse: Barbara A. Wallgren (m. 1952; died 1957) Marcy Walk Swan (m. 1960)
- Children: 7
- Education: Northwestern University

James Daniel Warner (May 1, 1924 - September 9, 2009) was bishop of the Episcopal Diocese of Nebraska from 1976 to 1990.

== Early life and education ==
Warner was born on May 1, 1924, in Sheridan, Wyoming, the son of Stephen Daniel Warner (1899-1974) and Grace Margaret Caple (1902-1997). He served in the US Navy during World War II, after which he attended Northwestern University, and graduated with a Bachelor of Science in 1950. He went on to study at Seabury-Western Theological Seminary, where he earned a Master of Divinity in 1953, and awarded an honorary Doctor of Divinity in 1977.

== Ordained ministry ==
Warner was ordained deacon on March 28, 1953, in All Saints' Church, Appleton, Wisconsin, by Bishop William H. Brady, Coadjutor of Fond du Lac. He was ordained priest that same year on October 3, by the Bishop of Fond du Lac Harwood Sturtevant, in St John's Church, Wisconsin Rapids, Wisconsin. He served as vicar of St James' Church in Mosinee, Wisconsin between 1953 and 1956, and then as rector of St Paul's Church in Marinette, Wisconsin between 1956 and 1960. He moved to Wichita, Kansas in 1960, to become assistant chaplain at St James' Church in Wichita, Kansas. He then served as rector of St Stephen's Church in Wichita between 1962 and 1970. In 1970, he became rector of Trinity Church in Oshkosh, Wisconsin, where he remained until 1976.

== Bishop ==
On August 27, 1976, Warner was elected on the third ballot as Bishop of Nebraska at a special council held in St Mark's Pro-Cathedral. He was consecrated on November 30, 1976, in St Cecilia's Cathedral, with Presiding Bishop John Allin as chief consecrator. During his episcopacy, he promoted ecumenism, and was instrumental in organizing a shared Holy Communion on March 13, 1983, between Lutherans and Episcopalians at Trinity Cathedral. Warner retired in 1989.

== Family ==
Warner married Barbara A. Wallgren on September 6, 1952, who died in 1957. He then married Marcella "Marcy" Walk Swan (1932-2015) on February 8, 1960. He had seven children: Stephen, David, Cheryl, Mark, Kathryn, James, and Tammy.
