= George A. Beecher =

Episcopal bishop (1868–1951)

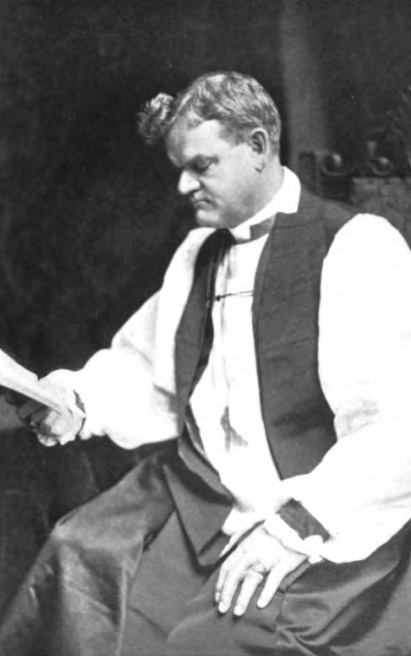
- Born: George Allen Beecher; February 3, 1868; Monmouth, Illinois, U.S.
- Died: June 14, 1951 (aged 83); Mount Pleasant, Iowa, U.S.
- Resting place: Kearney Cemetery; Kearney, Nebraska, U.S.
- Education: University of Nebraska; Philadelphia Divinity School
- Occupation: Bishop
- Spouse: Florence Idella George (m. 1893; died 1949)
- Children: 3

George Allen Beecher (February 3, 1868 - June 14, 1951) was the second and last bishop of the Episcopal Missionary District of Western Nebraska from 1910 to 1943. An alumnus of the University of Nebraska and Philadelphia Divinity School, he was consecrated on November 30, 1910.

== Early life ==
George Allen Beecher was born on February 3, 1868, in Monmouth, Illinois. His father was a farmer and owned a furniture store. When he was a boy, his family moved to Kearney, Nebraska. He attended Kearney High School and graduated from the University of Nebraska in 1888. He graduated from Philadelphia Divinity School in 1892.

== Career ==
Beecher showcased his marksmanship skills while touring Europe with Buffalo Bill and his Wild West show. He was a guest of Buffalo Bill at his show in Chicago in 1901. He also did missionary work with early settlers and Native Americans in the Great Plains.

Beecher was ordained as a deacon at St. Luke's Church in Kearney, Nebraska, in 1892 by Anson R. Graves. He was ordained as a priest in 1893 by Anson R. Graves. He was sent as a minister to Fort Sidney. He taught classes to the Sioux there. In 1895, he was rector of the Church of Our Savior in North Platte. He remained in the role for eight years. During this period, he grew a relationship with Buffalo Bill and Union Pacific president William M. Jeffers. In 1903, he became rector of St. Luke's Church in Kearney. In 1904, he became dean of Trinity Cathedral in Omaha, Nebraska. During his time as dean, he worked with the juvenile court and did welfare work. He was consecrated bishop of the Episcopal Missionary District of Western Nebraska in 1910 and served in that role until 1943. He was editor of the Western Nebraska Churchman and chaplain of the Nebraska National Guard. On his 25th anniversary as bishop, he was honored by Nebraska Governor Robert Leroy Cochran and Attorney Generals Paul F. Good and Clarence A. Davis. He was a guest of Woodrow Wilson at the White House.

Beecher was on the board of Clarkson Memorial Hospital in Omaha. He published the autobiography A Bishop of the Great Plains (1950) from his daily journal of more than 40 years.

== Personal life ==
Beecher married Florence Idella George of Racine, Wisconsin, on June 22, 1893. They had three children, Sanford, Mrs. Adrian Brian and Mrs. Frederic A. McNeil. His wife died in 1949. He was friends with Dwight D. Eisenhower and, according to his book, hunted alligators in the Panama Canal Zone with him. He moved to Hastings, Nebraska, in 1912 and lived on St. Joseph Street there. Towards the end of his life, he lived in Mount Pleasant, Iowa, with his daughter.

Beecher died on June 14, 1951, aged 83, at a hospital in Mount Pleasant. He was buried at Kearney Cemetery in Kearney, Nebraska.

== Awards ==
In 1912, he received an honorary Doctor of Divinity from the Philadelphia Divinity School. In 1939, he was awarded the Distinguished Service Medal by the Kiwanis Club of Lincoln, Nebraska.
