= Joseph Scott Barker =

American bishop

The Right Reverend Joseph Scott Barker
- Church: Episcopal Church
- Diocese: Nebraska
- Appointed: June 4, 2011
- In office: 2011–present
- Predecessor: Joe Goodwin Burnett

Orders
- Ordination: December 21, 1992 by James E. Krotz
- Consecration: October 8, 2011 by Katharine Jefferts Schori

Personal details
- Born: June 11, 1963 (age 63) Omaha, Nebraska, United States
- Denomination: Anglican
- Spouse: Anne E. Barker (m. 1998)
- Children: 2
- Education: Berkeley Divinity School; Yale College

Joseph Scott Barker (born June 11, 1963) is an American Episcopal clergyman, and the eleventh and current Bishop of Nebraska.

== Biography ==
Barker was born in Omaha, Nebraska. He graduated from Yale College in 1985 with a Bachelor of Arts in Religious Studies, and from Berkeley Divinity School at Yale in 1992 with a Master of Divinity in Anglican Studies. At Berkeley, he was awarded the Mersick Prize for effective public address and preaching, and the Tweedy Prize for exceptional promise as a pastoral leader.

Barker served as Assistant to the Dean and Canon Vicar at Trinity Cathedral in Omaha from 1992 to 1997, Rector of Church of the Resurrection in Omaha from 1997 to 2002, and Rector of Christ Church in Warwick, New York from 2002 to 2011.

Barker was consecrated on October 8, 2011, in La Vista, Nebraska, and is the 1,060th bishop in the American succession. Early in his episcopacy, Barker assisted in founding the Tri-Faith Initiative, a collaboration among Christians, Jews, and Muslims.

In 2024 Barker was shortlisted to succeed Michael Curry as Presiding Bishop of the Episcopal Church.

== See also ==
- List of Episcopal bishops of the United States
- Historical list of the Episcopal bishops of the United States
