= Missionary District of Western Nebraska =

Former diocese of the Episcopal Church

The Missionary District of Western Nebraska was a missionary district of the Episcopal Church in the United States of America.

== History ==
The diocese was established in 1889 when it was split off from the Diocese of Nebraska and named the Missionary District of The Platte. In 1898, it was renamed the Missionary District of Laramie, with the addition of eastern Wyoming, and in 1907 it became the Missionary District of Kearney, and in 1913 it was named the Missionary District of Western Nebraska. In 1946, the diocese was reunited with the Episcopal Diocese of Nebraska.

In 1918, St. Mark's in Hastings was designated pro-cathedral for the Western Nebraska district. It continues to hold that designation, although the district was absorbed into the Diocese of Nebraska.

=== Bishops of the Diocese ===
- Anson Rogers Graves (1890-1910)
- George Allen Beecher (1910-1943)
