= Joseph Burnett (disambiguation) =

Joseph Burnett was a Royal Australian Navy officer.

Joseph Burnett may also refer to:

- Joseph Burnett (educator)
- T Bone Burnett (Joseph Henry Burnett III), musician
- Joe Burnett, CFL cornerback
- Joe Goodwin Burnett, American prelate of the Episcopal Church
