= Henry H. Daniels =

English bishop

The Right Reverend Henry Hean Daniels D.D.
- Bishop of Montana
- Church: Episcopal Church
- Diocese: Montana
- In office: 1939–1957
- Predecessor: Herbert H. H. Fox
- Successor: Chandler Sterling
- Previous post: Coadjutor Bishop of Montana (1939)

Orders
- Ordination: May 1919 by Thomas Frederick Davies Jr.
- Consecration: July 27, 1939 by Herbert H. H. Fox

Personal details
- Born: February 14, 1885 Hertfordshire, England
- Died: March 5, 1958 (aged 73) Turners Falls, Massachusetts, United States
- Denomination: Anglican
- Parents: Thomas Daniels & Sophia Anderson
- Spouse: Rosemarie Schlichter (m. 1933)
- Children: 1
- Education: Berkeley Divinity School

Henry Hean Daniels (February 14, 1885 - March 5, 1958) was a bishop in The Episcopal Church, serving in Montana.

== Early life and education ==
Daniels was born on February 14, 1885, in Hertfordshire, England, the son of Thomas Daniels and Sophia Anderson. At the age of 17 he moved to Canada. He then studied at Berkeley Divinity School, graduating in 1918 with a Bachelor of Divinity and being awarded an honorary Doctor of Divinity in 1940.

== Ministry ==
Daniels was made deacon in June 1918 and ordained priest in May 1919 by Bishop Thomas Frederick Davies Jr. of Western Massachusetts. He married Rosemarie Schlichter on January 21, 1933, and together they had a daughter. He served as curate at St Stephen's Church in Pittsfield, Massachusetts, between 1918 and 1920, and then vicar of Trinity Church in Thermopolis, Wyoming, between 1920 and 1924. In 1924, he became missionary with City Institute in St. Louis, while in 1925, he returned to his previous post in Thermopolis, Wyoming, serving till 1927. Between 1927 and 1939, he served as Dean and rector of St Peter's Cathedral in Helena, Montana.

== Episcopacy ==
Daniels was elected Coadjutor Bishop of Montana in 1939, and was consecrated on July 27, 1939. He succeeded as diocesan in 1939, and retired in 1957. After his retirement, he served as vicar of St Andrew's Church in Turners Falls, Massachusetts, where he died in 1958.
