= Marlow Theatre =

Marlow Theatre may refer to:

- Marlow Theatre, Bridport, Dorset, England
- Marlow Theatre (Ironton, Ohio), on the National Register of Historic Places listings in Lawrence County, Ohio
- Marlow Theatre, Helen Historic District, Montana, United States

== See also ==
- Marlowe Theatre, a 1,200-seat theatre in Canterbury, England
