= Joe Goodwin Burnett =

American Episcopalian prelate (1948–2025)

The Right Reverend Joe Goodwin Burnett D.Min.
- Bishop of Nebraska
- Church: Episcopal Church
- Diocese: Nebraska
- Elected: May 9, 2003
- In office: 2003–2011
- Predecessor: James E. Krotz
- Successor: Joseph Scott Barker

Orders
- Ordination: 1975 by Duncan M. Gray Jr.
- Consecration: September 13, 2003 by James L. Jelinek

Personal details
- Born: May 15, 1948 Jackson, Mississippi, U.S.
- Died: November 14, 2025 (aged 77) Atlanta, Georgia, U.S.
- Denomination: Anglican
- Education: Perkins School of Theology; Millsaps College

Joe Goodwin Burnett (May 15, 1948 – November 14, 2025) was an American prelate of the Episcopal Church who served as the tenth Bishop of Nebraska between 2003 and 2011.

== Early life and education ==
Burnett was born in Jackson, Mississippi, on May 15, 1948. He studied at Millsaps College, from where he graduated with a Bachelor of Arts in 1970. He also studied at the Perkins School of Theology, from where he earned a Master of Divinity in 1974, and a Doctor of Ministry in 1985.

== Ordained ministry ==
Burnett was ordained deacon in 1974 and priest in 1975. He served as curate at St John's Church in Pascagoula, Mississippi between 1974 and 1976, and then as assistant priest at St James' Church in Jackson, Mississippi between 1976 and 1980. He became vicar of the Church of the Creator in Clinton, Mississippi in 1980, and then rector of St Peter's by the Sea in Gulfport, Mississippi in 1984. In 1991, he became rector of Trinity Church in Hattiesburg, Mississippi, a post he served in till 1999. He was then appointed Professor of Pastoral Theology at the School of Theology of the University of the South, where he remained until 2003.

== Bishop ==
Burnett was elected Bishop of Nebraska on the first ballot on May 9, 2003, and was consecrated on September 13, 2003, at the Omaha Civic Music Hall. He was installed on the same day as the tenth bishop of the diocese in Trinity Cathedral. He retained the post until his retirement in 2011, and was appointed Assistant Bishop of Maryland on April 1, 2011.

== Death ==
Burnett died at his home in Atlanta on November 14, 2025, at the age of 77.
