= Brookhart =

Brookhart is a surname. Notable people with the surname include:

- C. Franklin Brookhart Jr. (born 1948), American Episcopal bishop
- J. D. Brookhart (born 1964), American football player and coach
- Maurice Brookhart (born 1942), American chemist
- Smith W. Brookhart (1869–1944), American politician
