= James Warner =

James Warner may refer to:

- James Warner (aviator) (1891–1970), radio operator on the 1928 trans-Pacific flight of the Southern Cross
- James Warner (surveyor) (1814–1891), pioneer surveyor in Queensland, Australia
- James D. Warner (died 2009), bishop of the Episcopal Diocese of Nebraska
- James M. Warner (1836–1897), American Civil War general
- James K. Warner (born 1939), American neo-Nazi
- Jim Warner (born 1954), retired ice hockey forward
- Jimmy Warner (1865–1943), English footballer

== See also ==
- James Warner Bellah (1899–1976), author
