= St. Peter's Cathedral (Helena, Montana) =

Historic church in Montana, United States

St. Peter’s Cathedral
- The Cathedral Church of Saint Peter
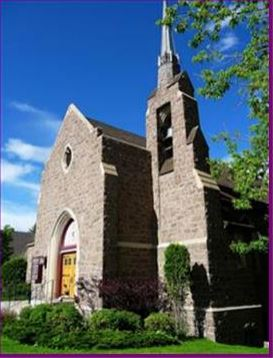
- St. Peter's Episcopal Cathedral in Helena, Montana
- St. Peter’s Cathedral
- 46°35′33.03″N 112°02′23.23″W
- Location: 511 N. Park Ave. Helena, Montana
- Country: United States
- Denomination: Episcopal Church
- Website: www.spchelena.org

History
- Status: Cathedral
- Founded: March 28, 1869
- Dedication: St Peter
- Dedicated: March 27, 1932

Architecture
- Functional status: Active
- Architect: Harold Whitehouse
- Style: Gothic Revival
- Groundbreaking: September 10, 1931
- Completed: 1932
- Construction cost: $90,000

Specifications
- Materials: Stone

Administration
- Province: Province 6
- Diocese: Montana

Clergy
- Bishop: Martha Elizabeth Stebbins
- Dean: Kendra Wilde
- St. Peter's Episcopal Church; St. Peter's Rectory
- U.S. Historic district – Contributing property
- Part of: Helena Historic District (ID90000934)
- Added to NRHP: June 14, 1990

St. Peter's Cathedral is located in Helena, Montana, United States. It is the seat of the Episcopal Diocese of Montana. In 1990 the cathedral was added as a contributing property in the Helena Historic District.

The cathedral reported 504 members in 2019 and 192 members in 2025. Plate and pledge income for the congregation in 2025 was $314,448 with average Sunday attendance (ASA) of 83. This was a relative decrease from ASA of 149 persons reported in 2016.

== History ==
The first Episcopal services were held in Helena on August 11, 1867 by Bishop Daniel Sylvester Tuttle and the Rev. E. N. Goddard. On March 28, 1869, Bishop Tuttle formed a Bishop's committee to establish an Episcopal mission in Helena; he celebrated Holy Eucharist in the courthouse. He paid $1,200 for property on Warren and Grand Streets to build a church, known as St. Peter's. A stone structure with a bell tower was completed for $12,000. The Holy Eucharist was first celebrated there on October 19, 1879, and the church was consecrated on November 11, 1881.

By 1920, St. Peter's was led by the Rev. Sidney Douglass Hooker, originally from Watertown, New York, who was rector through the initial planning of the new cathedral. Fundraising for the present church building was begun 1927. Spokane, Washington architect Harold Whitehouse designed it in the English country Gothic style. He also crafted a myrtlewood cross for the church. (He was elected as a Fellow to the American Institute of Architects for his work.)

The cornerstone was laid by Bishop William F. Faber on September 10, 1931. The stones for the cathedral were quarried in the Helena area. The new St. Peter's Church was completed for $90,000 and dedicated by Bishop Faber on Easter Sunday, March 27, 1932. The bell and brass altar from the first church were used in the new one. It was designated as the pro-cathedral for the diocese. In 1941, a residence for the dean was built next to the cathedral. It has subsequently become the Diocesan Offices, and it shares the cathedral's historic status. St. Peter's left its cathedral status in the mid-1990s, but returned to it in 2004.

== Contemporary ==
St. Peter's served as a pro-cathedral until the mid-1990s, when it was redesignated as a parish church. It was re-designated a cathedral in 2004. Other buildings on the property included the deanery, completed in 1941 and now serving as the Bishop's Office, and Wilson Hall, an education building completed in 1959.

It hosts the Togendowagon Society, a Native American ministry. Togendowagon means 'awakening'. Father Ray Brown celebrates Eucharist with drums, with offerings of sweet grass and sage, on the 2nd and 4th Saturdays of each month except July and August, due to powwow season.

It stands opposite the Olsen House.

== See also ==
- List of the Episcopal cathedrals of the United States
- List of cathedrals in the United States
