= Howard R. Brinker =

American bishop

The Right Reverend Howard Rasmus Brinker D.D., S.T.D.
- Bishop of Nebraska
- Church: Episcopal Church
- Diocese: Nebraska
- Elected: October 18, 1939
- In office: 1940–1962
- Predecessor: Ernest Vincent Shayler
- Successor: Russell T. Rauscher

Orders
- Ordination: April 14, 1919 by Nathaniel S. Thomas
- Consecration: January 25, 1940 by Henry St. George Tucker

Personal details
- Born: October 20, 1893 Nashotah, Wisconsin, United States
- Died: May 19, 1965 (aged 71) Omaha, Nebraska, United States
- Denomination: Anglican
- Parents: Henry Brinker & Anna Margaret Rasmus
- Spouse: Winifred Eleanor Parsons (m. 1934)
- Children: 2
- Education: University of Pennsylvania

Howard Rasmus Brinker (October 20, 1893 - May 19, 1965) was the fifth bishop of Nebraska in The Episcopal Church.

== Early life and education ==
Brinker was born on October 20, 1893, in Nashotah, Wisconsin, to Henry Brinker and Anna Margaret Rasmus. He was educated at the University of Pennsylvania, and then at the Philadelphia Divinity School, from where he graduated in 1918. Nashotah House awarded him a Doctor of Divinity on May 17, 1940, while the Philadelphia Divinity School awarded him a Doctor of Sacred Theology on June 6, 1940.

== Ordained ministry ==
Brinker was ordained deacon on June 23, 1918, and priest on April 14, 1919, by the Bishop of Wyoming Nathaniel S. Thomas. He served as rector of Christ Church in Douglas, Wyoming, between 1918 and 1923, and then rector of St Bartholomew's Church in Chicago between 1923 and 1940.

== Episcopacy ==
On October 18, 1939, Brinker was elected Bishop of Nebraska, and was consecrated on January 25, 1940, at Trinity Cathedral in Omaha, Nebraska. During his episcopacy, in 1946, the Diocese of Western Nebraska was reunited with the Diocese of Nebraska. He retired in 1962.

== Family ==
Brinker married Winifred Eleanor Parsons on July 29, 1934, and together had a daughter Marianna and a son Howard Rasmus Jr. Their son died at the age of two in 1944.
