= Ernest Vincent Shayler =

American bishop

The Right Reverend Ernest Vincent Shayler D.D.
- Bishop of Nebraska
- Church: Episcopal Church
- Diocese: Nebraska
- Elected: May 1919
- In office: 1919–1938
- Predecessor: Arthur Llewellyn Williams
- Successor: Howard R. Brinker

Orders
- Ordination: November 10, 1897 by Boyd Vincent
- Consecration: September 11, 1919 by Frederick W. Keator

Personal details
- Born: October 11, 1868 North Moreton, Oxfordshire, England
- Died: June 25, 1947 (aged 78) Los Angeles, California, United States
- Buried: Green Lawn Cemetery
- Denomination: Anglican
- Parents: Charles William Shayler & Charlotte Sherman
- Spouse: Mignon Louise Knight (m. 1886; died 1932) Frances B. Milbank (m. 1938)
- Children: 2

Ernest Vincent Shayler (October 11, 1868 – June 25, 1947) was the fourth bishop of the Episcopal Diocese of Nebraska.

== Early life and education ==
Shayler was born on October 11, 1868, in North Moreton, Oxfordshire, England, to Charles William Shayler and Charlotte Sherman. At the age of fifteen, he emigrated with his parents to the United States, and settled in Ohio. He studied at Kenyon College and after graduation in 1893, went on to study for the priesthood at Bexley Hall, from where he graduated in 1896. He was awarded a Doctor of Divinity by Kenyon College in 1919.

== Ordained ministry ==
Shayler was made deacon in 1893, and ordained to the priesthoood on November 10, 1897, by Bishop Boyd Vincent of Southern Ohio. He served as assistant at Trinity Church in Columbus, Ohio between 1893 and 1894, and then became deacon-in-charge, and afterward rector, of Calvary Church in Sandusky, Ohio. In 1900, he then became rector of Grace Church in Oak Park, Illinois, and in 1909, he transferred to Seattle to serve as rector of St Mark's Church. During the First World War, he was a civilian chaplain at the Puget Sound Naval Shipyard.

== Episcopacy ==
Shayler was elected Bishop of Nebraska in May 1919 on the second ballot. He was consecrated on September 11, 1919, by Bishop Frederick W. Keator of Olympia. He remained in office until 1938. Shayler died on June 25, 1947, at the Good Samaritan Hospital in Los Angeles.

== Books ==
- The Making of a Churchman (1908)
- The Making and Life of the Church

== See also ==
- List of bishops of the Episcopal Church in the United States of America
