= Leigh Richmond Brewer =

American bishop

The Right Reverend Richmond Brewer D.D.
- Bishop of Montana
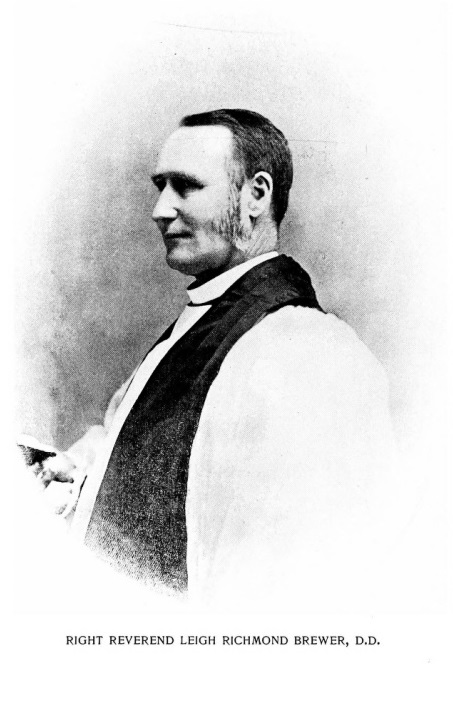
- Church: Episcopal Church
- Diocese: Montana
- Elected: 1880
- In office: 1880–1904
- Predecessor: Daniel S. Tuttle
- Successor: William F. Faber

Orders
- Ordination: July 1, 1866 by Arthur Cleveland Coxe
- Consecration: December 8, 1880 by Frederic Dan Huntington

Personal details
- Born: January 20, 1839 Berkshire, Vermont, United States
- Died: August 28, 1916 (aged 77) Helena, Montana, United States
- Buried: Forestvale Cemetery, Helena
- Denomination: Anglican
- Parents: Sheldon Sykes Leigh Brewer & Lura Crampton
- Spouse: Henrietta W. Foote (m. 1866)
- Children: 1
- Education: Hobart College

Leigh Richmond Brewer (January 20, 1839 - August 28, 1916) was a bishop of Montana in The Episcopal Church.

== Biography ==
Brewer was born on January 20, 1839, in Berkshire, Vermont to Sheldon Sykes and Lura Brewer. He graduated from Hobart College in 1863. During the course he was awarded a prize in Latin during his sophomore year, a prize in Greek during his junior year, the first White essay prize and the second Cobb essay prize in the senior year. He graduated from the General Theological Seminary in 1866.

He was ordained deacon by Henry C. Potter, Bishop of New York on July 1, 1866, in the Church of the Annunciation in New York. He was ordained a priest by Bishop Arthur Cleveland Coxe of Western New York on June 16, 1867. He became rector of Grace Church in Carthage, New York. After 6 years he became rector of Trinity Church in Watertown, New York. His elected to the episcopacy came in 1880 when he was elected Bishop of Montana. He was consecrated in Trinity Church Watertown on December 8, 1880, by Bishop Frederic Dan Huntington of Central New York, together with Bishop Daniel S. Tuttle of Utah, William Bissell of Vermont, Benjamin Wistar Morris of Oregon and Benjamin Henry Paddock of Massachusetts.
