= Russell T. Rauscher =

American bishop

The Right Reverend Russell Theodore Rauscher D.D.
- Bishop of Nebraska
- Church: Episcopal Church
- Diocese: Nebraska
- Elected: January 25, 1961
- In office: 1962–1972
- Predecessor: Howard R. Brinker
- Successor: Robert Varley
- Previous post: Coadjutor Bishop of Nebraska (1961-1962)

Orders
- Ordination: October 1941 by Harry S. Longley
- Consecration: May 2, 1961 by Arthur C. Lichtenberger

Personal details
- Born: July 19, 1908 Lockridge, Iowa, United States
- Died: May 14, 1989 (aged 80) Omaha, Nebraska, United States
- Buried: Saint Andrew's Church, Omaha, Nebraska
- Denomination: Anglican
- Parents: Wilhelm Christian Fredrick Rauscher & Magdalena Louisa Schmidtlein
- Spouse: Marjorie Doris Truesdell (m. 1933; died 1984)
- Children: 1
- Education: Wesleyan University

Russell Theodore Rauscher (July 19, 1908 - May 14, 1989) was a bishop of the Episcopal Church, serving in Nebraska.

== Early life and education ==
Rauscher was born on July 19, 1908, in Lockridge, Iowa, the son of Wilhelm Christian Fredrick Rauscher and Magdalena Louisa Schmidtlein. He studied at Wesleyan University and graduated in 1938. He then studied theology at Seabury-Western Theological Seminary, graduating in 1941 with a Bachelor of Divinity. He married Marjorie Doris Truesdell on July 15, 1933.

== Ordained ministry ==
Rauscher was ordained deacon in March 1941, and priest in October 1941, by Bishop Harry S. Longley of Iowa. He served as priest-in-charge of St. Luke's Church in Fort Madison, Iowa, and St. Michael's Church in Mount Pleasant, Iowa, between 1941 and 1945. In 1945 he became priest-in-charge of St Andrew's Church in Mooar, Iowa, and St. Barnabas Church in Montrose, Iowa. That same year he became a chaplain with the US Navy and served on the USS Samaritan (AH-10) in the Pacific. In 1946, he became vicar of St. Matthew's Church in Iowa Falls, Iowa, while in 1948 he became rector of St. Andrew's Church in Lawton, Oklahoma, where he remained till 1956. Between 1950 and 1951, he also served as a chaplain in Korea during the Korean War. Between 1956 and 1961, he was rector of All Souls' Church in Oklahoma City.

== Bishop ==
Rauscher was elected Bishop Coadjutor of Nebraska on the first ballot on January 25, 1961, during a special convention held in St. Stephen's Church, Grand Island, Nebraska. He was consecrated on May 2, 1961, in the Music Hall of the Civic Auditorium in Omaha, Nebraska. He succeeded Bishop Brinker as diocesan bishop on February 1, 1962. He retained the post till his retirement in 1972. He died on May 14, 1989, at Clarkson Memorial Hospital in Omaha, Nebraska.
