= Episcopal Diocese of Montana =

Diocese of the Episcopal Church in the United States

Diocese of Montana Diœcesis Montanensis

Location
- Country: United States
- Territory: Montana
- Ecclesiastical province: Province VI
- Headquarters: Helena, Montana

Statistics
- Congregations: 32 (2025)
- Members: 3,100 (2025)

Information
- Denomination: Episcopal Church
- Established: June 19, 1904
- Cathedral: St Peter's Cathedral, Helena

Current leadership
- Bishop: Martha Elizabeth Stebbins

Map
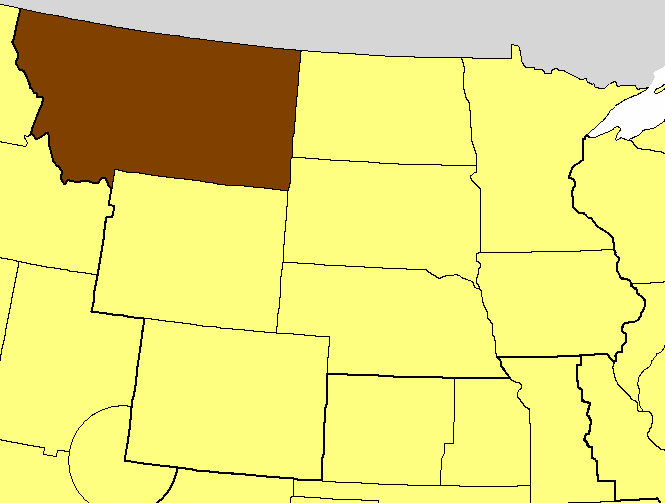
- Location of the Diocese of Montana

Website
- diomontana.com

The Episcopal Diocese of Montana is the diocese of the Episcopal Church in the United States of America with jurisdiction over the state of Montana. It was established in 1904. It is in Province 6 and its cathedral, St. Peter's Cathedral, is in Helena, as are the diocesan offices.

The diocese reported 4,386 members in 2019 and 3,100 members in 2025. Plate and pledge income for the 32 filing congregations of the diocese in 2025 was $3,646,782. Average Sunday attendance (ASA) reported in 2025 was 1,000 persons, a relative decline from 1,444 in 2015.

== List of bishops ==
The bishops of Montana have been:

1. Daniel S. Tuttle, missionary bishop (1866–1880)
2. Leigh R. Brewer, missionary bishop (1880–1904), first diocesan bishop (1904–1916)
  * William F. Faber, coadjutor (1914–1916)
3. William F. Faber (1916–1934)
  * Herbert H. H. Fox, suffragan, 1920, coadjutor bishop, 1925 (VI Idaho, 1925–1926)
4. Herbert H. H. Fox (1934–1939)
  * Henry Hean Daniels, coadjutor bishop (1939)
5. Henry Hean Daniels (1939–1957)
  * Chandler W. Sterling, coadjutor bishop (1956)
6. Chandler W. Sterling (1957–1968)
7. Jackson Earle Gilliam (1968–1985)
8. Charles Irving Jones III (1986–2001)
  * Charles L. Keyser, assisting bishop (2001–2003)
9. C. Franklin Brookhart, Jr. (2003–2018)
10. Martha Elizabeth Stebbins (December 7, 2019-current)

== See also ==
- Historical list of bishops of the Episcopal Church in the United States of America
