= Robert Varley =

American bishop

The Right Reverend Robert Patrick Varley D.D.
- Bishop of Nebraska
- Church: Episcopal Church
- Diocese: Nebraska
- Elected: 1971
- In office: 1972–1975
- Predecessor: Russell T. Rauscher
- Successor: James D. Warner
- Previous post: Coadjutor Bishop of Nebraska (1971-1972)

Orders
- Ordination: July 1947 by William R. Moody
- Consecration: November 28, 1971 by John E. Hines

Personal details
- Born: October 18, 1921 Allentown, Pennsylvania, United States
- Died: May 3, 2000 (aged 78)
- Denomination: Anglican
- Parents: Thomas Joseph Varley & Ada Pearl Graybill
- Spouse: Beverly D. Nelson (m. 1947)
- Children: 2

Robert Patrick Varley (October 18, 1921 - May 3, 2000) was a bishop of The Episcopal Church, serving in Nebraska and Minnesota.

== Early life and education ==
Varley was born on October 18, 1921, in Allentown, Pennsylvania, the son of Thomas Joseph Varley and Ada Pearl Graybill. He studied at Carroll College, from where he graduated with a Bachelor of Arts in 1945, and then at Nashotah House, where he earned a Bachelor of Divinity in 1947.

== Ordained ministry ==
Varley was ordained deacon on January 25, 1947, by Bishop Oliver J. Hart of Pennsylvania in All Hallows' Church, Wyncote, Pennsylvania, and priest in July 1947 by Bishop William R. Moody of Lexington. He married Beverly D. Nelson on June 9, 1947, and together has two children. He then served as assistant rector of St Paul's Church in Chester, Pennsylvania between 1947 and 1950, rector of St Stephen's Church in Beverly, New Jersey between 1950 and 1956, and rector of St Peter's Church in Salisbury, Maryland between 1957 and 1971.

== Bishop ==
In 1971, Varley was elected Coadjutor Bishop of Nebraska, and was consecrated on November 28, 1971. He succeeded as diocesan in 1972, and retained the post till his resignation in 1975. Between 1981 and 1986, he also served as Assistant Bishop in Minnesota. After his retirement, he served as interim of Christ Church in Manhasset, New York, Good Shepherd Church in Jacksonville, Florida, All Saints' Church in Florence, South Carolina, and Grace Church in Lynchburg, Virginia. He was also Assisting Bishop of Florida and bishop-in-residence of Florida. Varley died on May 3, 2000, of an Aneurysm.
