= Olsen House (Helena, Montana) =

Historic house in Montana, United States

- U.S. National Register of Historic Places
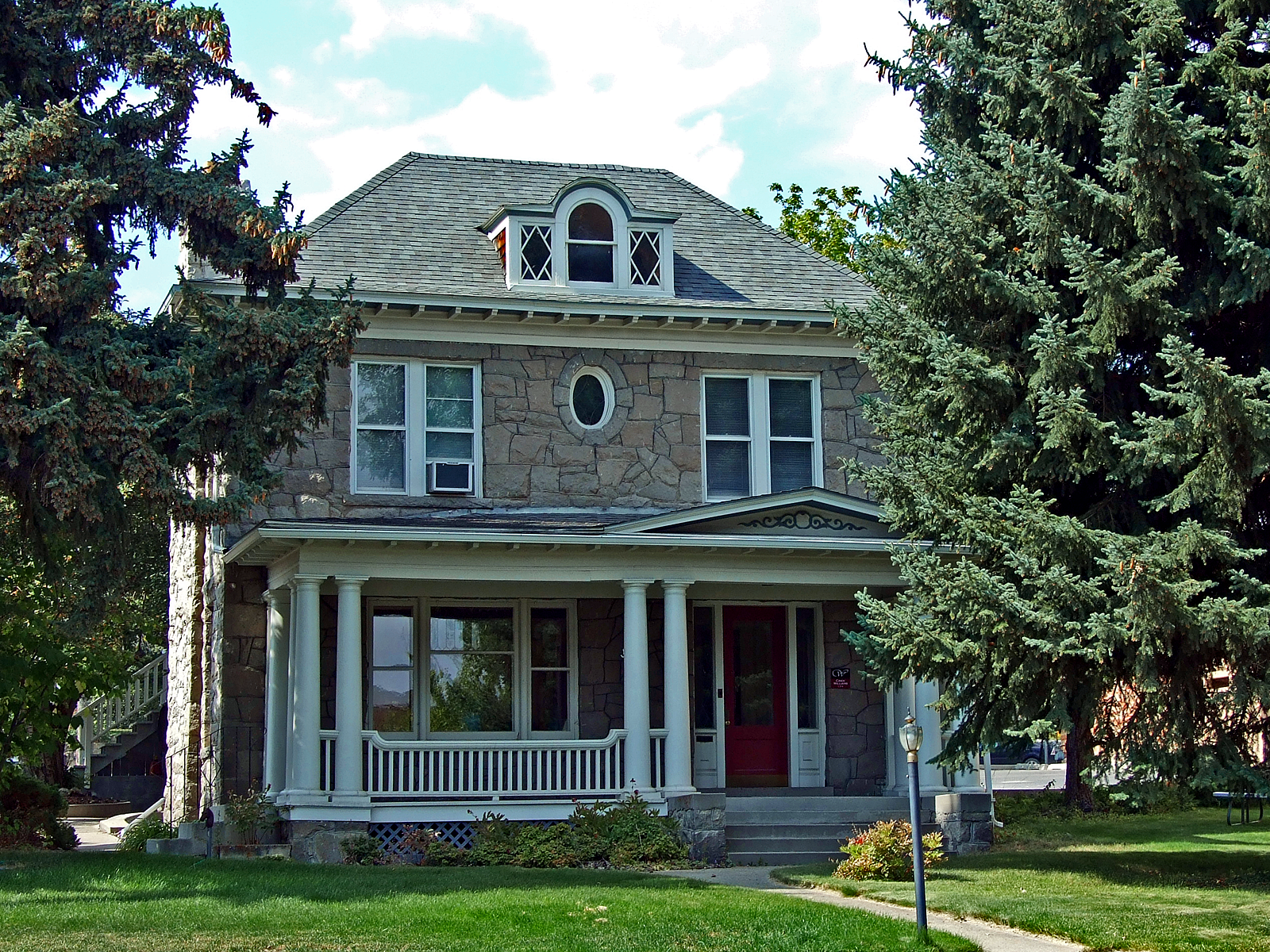

- Location within Montana Location within the United States
- Location: 516 North Park Avenue, Helena, Montana
- Coordinates: 46°35′33″N 112°2′23″W
- Area: less than one acre
- Built: 1885
- Architectural style: Italianate, Vernacular Italianate
- NRHP reference No.: 91000333
- Added to NRHP: March 22, 1991

The Olsen House is a historic house in Helena, Montana. It has been listed on the National Register of Historic Places since March 22, 1991. It stands opposite St. Peter's Cathedral.

== History ==
The plot of land was purchased in 1874 by Amelia Dissa, and her husband Louis Derrick built a one and a half-story cottage facing Park Avenue. It was built with wood and designed in the Gothic Revival architectural style.

After he died in the late 1870s, she married Ingethen Olsen, an American pioneer who owned a ranch in Fergus County, Montana, but the house remained in her name. By 1884–1885, they built a two-story rectangular addition and a gable. After Olsen died in 1904, his wife replaced the wooden cottage frame with a two-story front built with bluestone; it was completed in 1908–1909. When she died in 1918, the house was inherited by her daughter Amelia M. Olsen, who lived there until 1946.

Four years later, in 1950, the house was purchased by John Conway Harrison, who was elected as a justice of the Montana Supreme Court in 1961. He lived in the house until 1988, and he sold it to Robert Haseman in 1989. The house was later used as offices.
