= St. Mark's Pro-Cathedral (Hastings, Nebraska) =

Historic church in Nebraska, United States

- St. Mark's Episcopal Pro-Cathedral
- U.S. National Register of Historic Places
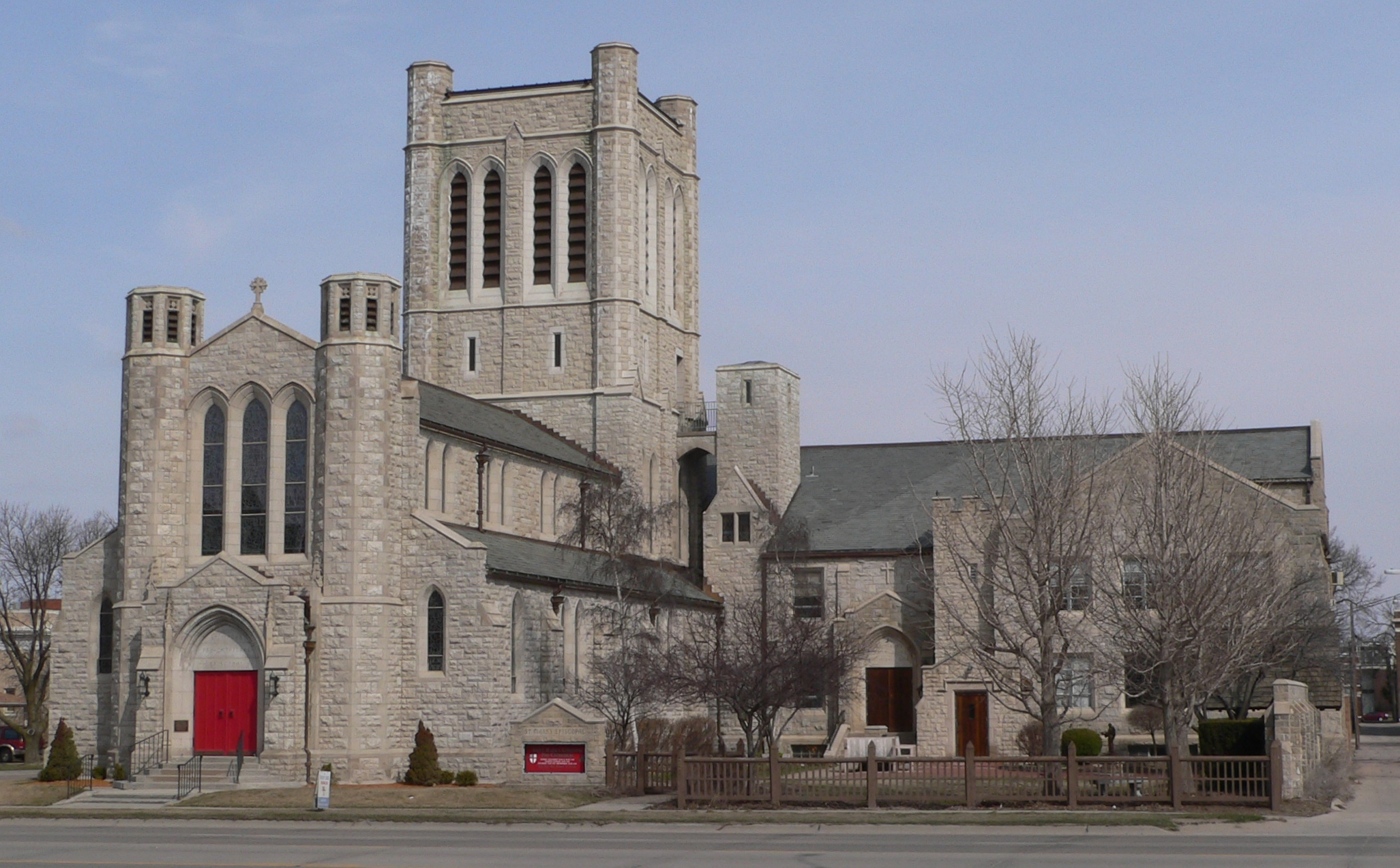

- Location within Nebraska Location within the United States
- Location: Junction of 4th and Burlington; Hastings, Nebraska
- Coordinates: 40°35′16″N 98°23′29″W
- Built: 1921-1929
- Architect: Ralph Adams Cram
- Architectural style: Late Gothic Revival
- NRHP reference No.: 87002086
- Added to NRHP: November 30, 1987

St. Mark's Pro-Cathedral is an Episcopal Church building located in Hastings, Nebraska, United States. It has been listed on the National Register of Historic Places since 1987. In 2020, it reported 247 members, average attendance of 64, and $120,307 in plate and pledge financial support. No membership statistics were reported in 2024 national parochial reports.

== History ==
When the Rev. John W. Greenwood arrived in Hastings in 1880 to organize the parish, St. Mark's was an unorganized mission with no property or building, and with very few members. He held the first service on April 25, 1880 in a public hall (possibly a pub). The parish was organized and given its name on May 3, 1880 at a meeting in Charles Cameron's store at the corner of Hastings Avenue and First Street. Bishop Robert Harper Clarkson of the Diocese of Nebraska pledged $400 to build a church building. A wooden structure was built at a cost of $1,200. It was dedicated by Bishop Clarkson on January 23, 1881.

The Daughters of Saint Mark's suggested that a new church be built in memory of the rector’s late wife Jessie Hornbrook Young. In 1912, they raised $10,000 after Bishop George Beecher suggested that Hastings be made a see city and the new church become the cathedral. St. Mark's was designated as a pro-cathedral in 1918 and served as the cathedral for the Missionary District of Western Nebraska until it merged with the Diocese of Nebraska in 1946. As part of the merger, it was agreed that St. Mark's would retain its designation as a pro-cathedral as a way of symbolizing the history and missionary tradition of the western part of the diocese.

Noted Boston architect Ralph Adams Cram was chosen to design the new church. The cornerstone was laid by Bishop Beecher on December 5, 1922. The crypt and part of the walls were completed and a chapel was made in the crypt when money to complete the structure ran out. The parishioners were reluctant to go into debt for the building project. As additional funds became available, the structure was completed in 1929, but without its original central tower. The Edward R. Green Company completed the construction; the total spent to build the church amounted to $125,000. The education wing, which was part of Cram's plan for the cathedral complex, was completed in 1959. The square-shaped tower at the crossing was not completed until 2001.

== Architecture ==
The church building was added to the National Register of Historic Places in 1987. In its National Register nomination, the cathedral design is described as typical of the Late Gothic Revival style, which is more subdued than the earlier High Victorian Gothic style. The rock face of the limestone structure contributes to an overall impression of monochromaticity. The plan of the building has characteristics of English Gothic churches, including an emphasis on length, a moderately pitched roof, and a tower at the crossing. Two octagon shaped towers flank the main façade. The main entry projects from the front of the building. Its double doors are flanked by buttresses and topped by a parapet gable. A triple lancet window is above the entrance in the upper section of the building.

In its interior, the cathedral has a rectangular nave with arcades on both sides. The roof structure, described in the National Register nomination as "an elaborate beam system of king post trusses", is exposed in the ceiling. Walls are plastered and stained glass is included in all of the windows. The pulpit, lectern and seating for the choir are located at the crossing. A rood screen and the altar have been placed in the chancel.
