= Martha Elizabeth Stebbins =

Episcopalian bishop

The Right Reverend Martha Elizabeth Stebbins
- Bishop of Montana
- Church: Episcopal Church
- Diocese: Montana
- Elected: July 26, 2019
- In office: 2019–present
- Predecessor: C. Franklin Brookhart Jr.

Orders
- Ordination: December 28, 2005 by J. Gary Gloster
- Consecration: December 7, 2019 by Michael Curry

Personal details
- Denomination: Anglican
- Spouse: Bob Gruidier

Martha Elizabeth Stebbins is an American academic, engineer, and Prelate of The Episcopal Church, currently serving as the Bishop of Montana.

== Education ==
Stebbins studied at the North Carolina State University from where she graduated with a Bachelor of Science in Zoology in 1981, a Bachelor of Science in Mechanical Engineering in 1986, a Doctor of Veterinary Medicine in 1987, and a Doctor of Philosophy in Veterinary Medical Sciences with a focus on veterinary microbiology in 1994. She also graduated with a Master of Public Health in Epidemiology in 1991 from the University of North Carolina with a concentration on infectious diseases. In 2005, she also graduated with a Masters of Divinity from the Seminary of the Southwest.

== Career in science ==
Stebbins spent a number of years, between 1992 and 2005, as an independent consultant/contractor in Epidemiology, Public Health, Microbiology, Veterinary Medicine, and Contract Research Organizations, and as Adjunct Assistant Professor of Epidemiology at the University of North Carolina between 1993 and 2002. Between 1991 and 1993, Stebbins was an Assistant Professor of Epidemiology at the Oklahoma State University. In 1994, she then became a manager in clinical development with Embrex, Inc, a biotechnology company based in Durham, North Carolina. Between 1997 and 1998, she was an Adjunct Assistant Professor of Epidemiology at the North Carolina State University, and simultaneously a Clinical Project Manager with Clintrials Research Inc. In 1998, she undertook the post of Visiting Assistant Professor of Epidemiology at the North Carolina State University, which she retained till 2002.

== Ecclesiastical career ==
After completion of her theological training, Stebbins was ordained deacon on June 25, 2005 by Bishop Michael Curry of North Carolina, and priest on December 28, 2005 by Bishop J. Gary Gloster Suffragan of North Carolina. She then served as missioner for Sandhills Episcopal Cluster of Churches in the Diocese of North Carolina between 2005 and 2010. In 2010, she became rector of St Timothy’s Church in Wilson, North Carolina, where she remained till her election in 2019. Since 2007, she also served as chaplain for the Province IV’s HIV/AIDs Retreat at the Kanuga Conference Center.

During a special convention held on July 26, 2019 in Bozeman, Montana, Stebbins was elected Bishop of Montana. She was then consecrated bishop on December 7, 2019 at St Paul’s United Methodist Church in Helena, Montana. She was installed as bishop on December 8, 2019, in St Peter's Cathedral.
