= Eliot Graves =

American football player and sports coach (1882–1967)

Biographical details
- Born: September 24, 1882; Bennington, Vermont, U.S.
- Died: 1967

Playing career

Football
- 1903: Nebraska
- Position: Halfback

Coaching career (HC unless noted)

Football
- 1906–1908: Lawrence

Basketball
- 1907–1909: Lawrence

Head coaching record
- Overall: 11–10 (football); 13–6 (basketball)

Eliot Varnum Graves (September 24, 1882 – 1967) was an American football player and coach of football and basketball. He served as the head football coach at Lawrence University in Appleton, Wisconsin from 1906 to 1908, compiling a record of 11–10. Graves was also the head basketball coach at Lawrence from 1907 to 1909, tallying a mark of 13–6. Graves played football at the University of Nebraska–Lincoln in 1903. He was the son of Episcopalian bishop Anson Rogers Graves.

== Head coaching record ==
=== Football ===
Year	Team	Overall	Conference	Standing	Bowl/playoffs
Lawrence Vikings (Independent) (1906–1908)
1906	Lawrence	4–3			
1907	Lawrence	4–3			
1908	Lawrence	3–4			
Lawrence:		11–10			
Total:		11–10			
