= Charles Irving Jones III =

American Episcopal bishop

The Right Reverend Charles Irving Jones D.D.
- Bishop of Montana
- Church: Episcopal Church
- Diocese: Montana
- Elected: 1985
- In office: 1986–2001
- Predecessor: Jackson Earle Gilliam
- Successor: C. Franklin Brookhart Jr.

Orders
- Ordination: 1977
- Consecration: February 8, 1986 by Edmond L. Browning
- Rank: 803 in the American succession

Personal details
- Born: September 13, 1943 (age 83) El Paso, Texas, United States
- Denomination: Anglican
- Parents: Charles Irving Jones Jr. & Helen A. Heyward
- Spouse: Ashby MacArthur (m. 1966)
- Children: 4

Charles Irving Jones III (born September 13, 1943) was an Episcopal prelate who served as Bishop of Montana from 1986 until 2001, when he was deposed by the Court for the Trial of a Bishop.

== Biography ==
Jones was born on September 13, 1943, in El Paso, Texas, the son of Charles Irving Jones Jr. and Helen A. Heyward. He graduated with a Bachelor of Science in 1965 and a Master of Business Administration from the University of North Carolina in 1966. He also graduated with a Master of Divinity in 1977 and with a Doctor of Divinity in 1989 from the University of the South.

He worked as a public accountant with D.E. Gatewood and Company in Winston-Salem, North Carolina between 1966 and 1972. In 1972, he became Director of development at Chatham (Virginia) Hall, while in 1974, he became an instructor of accounting at the University of the South, retaining the post until 1977.

From 1977 until 1981 he was College chaplain at Western Kentucky University and Vicar of Trinity Church in Russellville, Kentucky from 1977 until 1985. He was also Archdeacon of Kentucky from 1981 until 1986, when he was elected Bishop of Montana.

== Resignation ==
In 2000 an allegation was made against Bishop Jones alleging that he had a sexual relationship with a parishioner and parish employee who sought pastoral counseling from him when he was the rector of a parish in Kentucky, hence violating Title IV, Canon 1. Jones submitted his resignation to the diocesan council on February 26, 2001. The resignation, which became effective on February 28, followed a February 14 decision by the Court for the Trial of a Bishop deposing Jones for sexual misconduct. In exchange for Jones' resignation, the Standing Committee and Diocesan Council agreed to give him a $170,000 settlement. The agreement included forgiving his home mortgage with the diocese, which had a balance of slightly less than $55,000, and the remainder covering 15 months of his salary, minus travel pay.
