= Jackson Earle Gilliam =

American bishop

The Right Reverend Jackson Earle Gilliam D.D.
- Bishop of Montana
- Church: Episcopal Church
- Diocese: Montana
- Elected: 1968
- In office: 1968–1985
- Predecessor: Chandler Sterling
- Successor: Charles Irving Jones III

Orders
- Ordination: July 1949 by Lane W. Barton
- Consecration: September 16, 1968 by John E. Hines

Personal details
- Born: June 20, 1920 Heppner, Oregon, United States
- Died: October 19, 2000 (aged 80) Kealakekua, Hawaii, United States
- Denomination: Anglican
- Parents: Edwin Earle Gilliam & Mary Elizabeth Perry
- Spouse: Margaret Kathleen Hindley (m. 1943)
- Children: 3
- Education: Whitman College

Jackson Earle Gilliam (June 20, 1920 – October 19, 2000) was bishop of the Episcopal Diocese of Montana, serving from 1968 to 1985.

== Early years and Education ==
Gilliam was born on June 20, 1920, in Heppner, Oregon, to Edwin Earle Gilliam and Mary Elizabeth Perry. He attended Whitman College where he graduated with honors in 1942. After serving in the United States Army from 1942 to 1946, he attended the Episcopal Theological Seminary in Alexandria, Virginia. He graduated with a Bachelor of Divinity degree in 1948. He then did further study and received a Master of Sacred Theology degree the following year.

== Ordination and Ministry ==
He was ordained to deacon on Jun 10, 1948, by William Remington, Suffragan Bishop of Pennsylvania in St Mary's Church in Arlington, Virginia. After his ordination to the priesthood in July 1949, he served as rector of St John's Church in Hermiston, Oregon, till 1953, when he became a canon of the Cathedral chapter of St Mark's Cathedral in Minneapolis. In 1955, he became rector of the Church of the Incarnation in Great Falls, Montana, a position he held till 1968.

== Bishop ==
In 1968, Gilliam was elected Bishop of Montana. He was consecrated on September 16, 1968, in the Roman Catholic Cathedral of St. Helena, Helena, Montana with Presiding Bishop John E. Hines as chief consecrator. The co-consecrators were Chandler Sterling, former Bishop of Montana and George M. Murray, Coadjutor Bishop of Alabama. He retired in 1985.

== Personal life ==
He was married to Margaret Kathleen Hindley on August 11, 1943, and they had three children.
