= Herbert H. H. Fox =

American Episcopal bishop (1871–1943)

The Right Reverend Herbert H. H. Fox
- Bishop of Montana
- Fox in the 1920s
- Church: Episcopal Church
- Diocese: Montana
- In office: 1934–1939
- Predecessor: William F. Faber
- Successor: Henry Hean Daniels
- Previous posts: Suffragan Bishop of Montana (1920–1925); Coadjutor Bishop of Montana (1925–1934); Bishop of Idaho (1925–1926)

Orders
- Ordination: December 1900 by Frederic Dan Huntington
- Consecration: November 10, 1921 by Daniel S. Tuttle

Personal details
- Born: Herbert Henry Heywood Fox; March 11, 1871 Montclair, New Jersey, U.S.
- Died: November 24, 1943 (aged 72) Billings, Montana, U.S.
- Denomination: Anglican
- Parents: James Fox & Anne Wood
- Spouse: Alma Louise Walther (m. 1902)
- Children: 2
- Education: Hobart College

Herbert Henry Heywood Fox (March 11, 1871 – November 24, 1943) served as bishop of the Episcopal Diocese of Montana and the Episcopal Diocese of Idaho.

== Early life ==
Fox was born March 11, 1871, in Montclair, New Jersey, the son of Ann Wood and James Fox. His parents immigrated from England to the east coast of the United States in the 1860s. His father was a master wood worker, and his mother died when he was three years old. James Fox remarried several years later, but this marriage did not last, and the father and son moved to California in 1886 to work on a ranch in Carmel Valley. They returned to the east coast a short time later and worked in the steel mills and potteries in New Jersey.

== Education ==
During the late 1880s Fox attended the Newark Evening Technical School where he studied technical drawing. However he turned to a different career and studied theology at Hobart College in 1893. After graduation, he attended the General Theological Seminary in New York, and was ordained deacon by Bishop Thomas A. Starkey of Newark in 1900, and priest in December 1900 by Bishop Frederic Dan Huntington of Central New York.

== Ministry ==
Fox served as missionary-in-charge of Slaterville Springs, Speedsville, and Dryden in New York between 1900 and 1901. He then became vicar of All Saints' Church in Lockport, New York, in 1901, while in 1905, he became rector of All Saints' Church in Pontiac, Michigan. Between 1914 and 1920, he served as rector of St John's Church in Detroit.

In 1920, he was elected Suffragan Bishop of Montana. He became Coadjutor Bishop of Montana in 1925 and succeeded as diocesan bishop in 1934. Between 1925 and 1926 Fox was also Bishop of Idaho.

== Personal life ==
Fox married Alma Louise Walther on September 3, 1902. They had two children: Mary, born June 24, 1907, and Henry, born December 13, 1911. Fox died on November 24, 1943.
