= Helena Historic District (Helena, Montana) =

Historic district in Montana, United States

- Helena Historic District and Boundary Increases I and II
- U.S. National Register of Historic Places
- U.S. Historic district
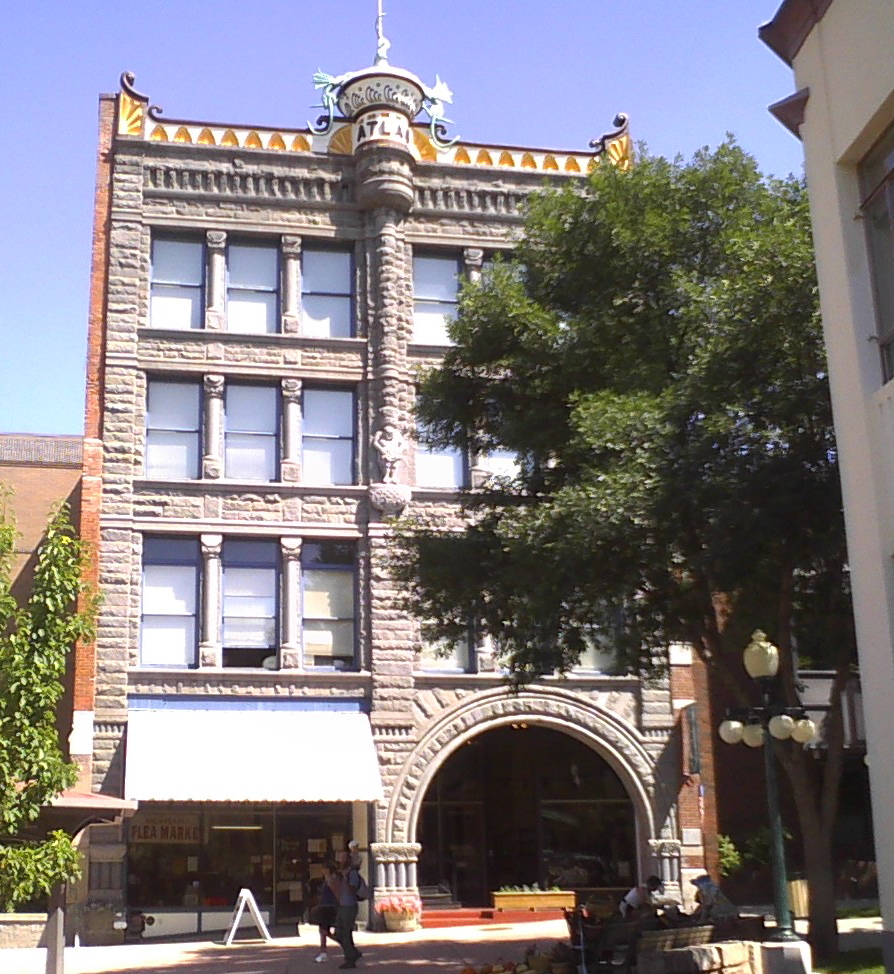
- Atlas Block, within the Helena Historic District

- Location within Montana Location within the United States
- Location: Irregular pattern from Hauser Boulevard to Acropolis and between Garfield and Rodney Sts., Helena, Montana; also roughly bounded by Cruse, Neill, and Park Aves., and Lawrence; also bounded by E. Sixth, N. Davis, Broadway, and N. Rodney Sts.
- Coordinates: 46.58923°N 112.03822°W
- Area: 150 acres (61 ha) (original); 22 acres (8.9 ha) (boundary increase I); 10 acres (4.0 ha) (boundary increase II)
- Built: 1864
- Architect: Multiple
- Architectural style: Art Deco, French Renaissance, Gothic Revival, Late Victorian, Romanesque Revival, Western Commercial
- NRHP reference No.: 72000737; 90000934; 93001001
- Added to NRHP: June 2, 1972 (original); June 14, 1990 (boundary increase I); October 7, 1993 (boundary increase II)

The Helena Historic District (HHD) is a federally designated historic district in Helena, Montana, United States. Since its establishment in 1972, the HHD has had boundary adjustments in 1990 and 1993. The original 1972 designation was composed of two unconnected sections known as "Downtown" and "West Residential".

== Downtown section ==
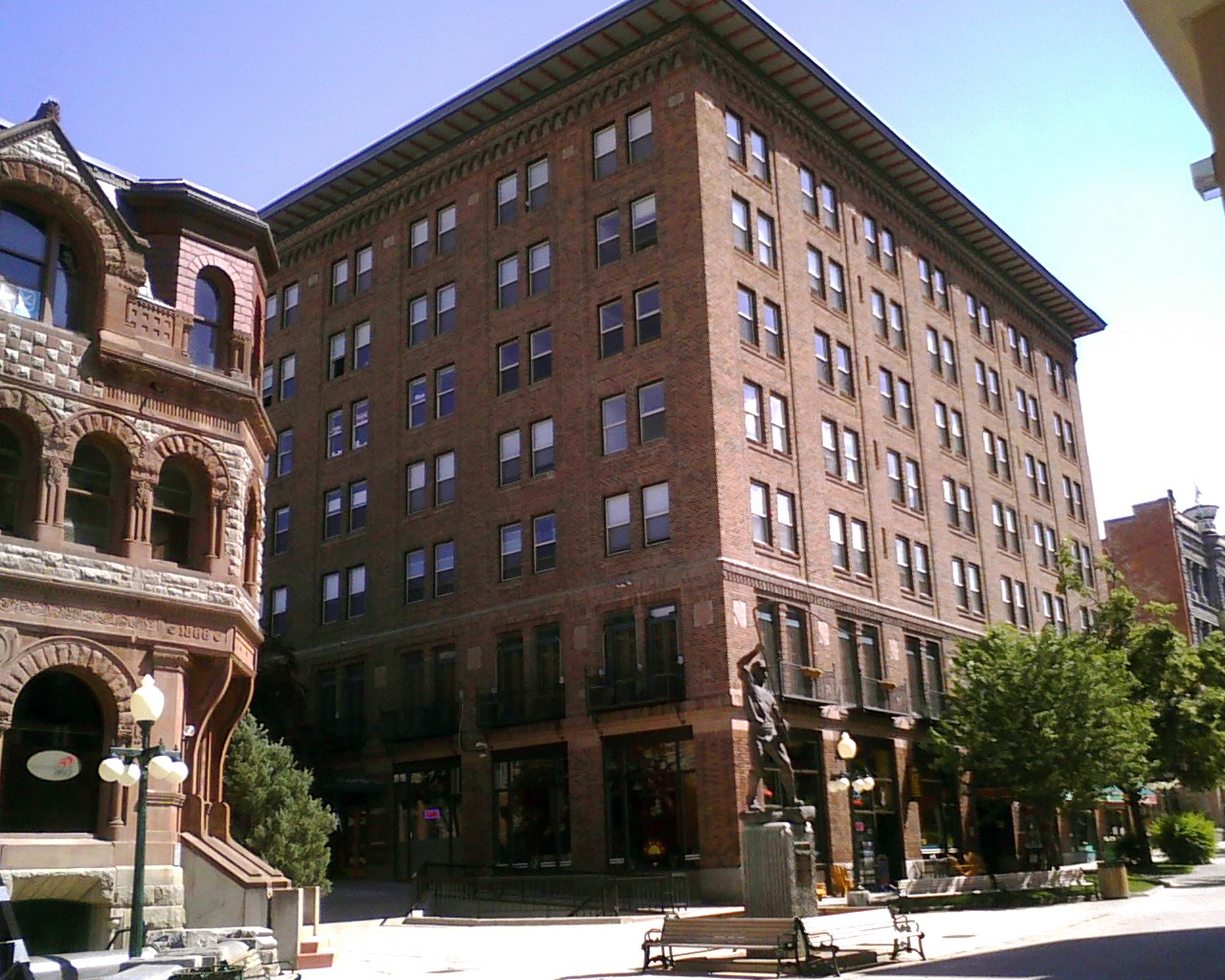
Placer Hotel and Securities Building, downtown Helena

Helena was initially founded in the downtown section. On July 14, 1864 four miners, dubbed the "Four Georgians" (though only one was from Georgia), discovered gold in a creekbed along what today is Helena's downtown main street, Last Chance Gulch. This sparked a cultural and building boom that lasted 30 years and Helena became the state capital. The city grew from south to north along Last Chance Gulch, its main street, and hence the evolution of architectural styles can be traced. At the southern end the road is narrow with small log and stone buildings and at the northern end the road is wider and has large stonework homes. Few major downtown buildings were built in the years immediately after the Panic of 1893, which among other problems, caused the closing of the local silver mines. This resulted in downtown Helena having a sharp division in its older and newer sections. Most of the newer buildings were small, had a single function, and had a false front. At the time of the initial 1972 NRHP nomination, some of the significant buildings that still stood from that early time were: the Electric and Power Blocks, Helena Athletic Association, Auerbach Buildings, Merchants Hotel (later Monticello Apartments), Atlas Block, Diamond Block, the Wheat Building (Merchants National Bank Building) and the Lewis and Clark County Courthouse. A major fire in 1928 affected the area, destroying many original buildings, including the Granite, Bailey, Gold, and New York Store blocks. Additional buildings in the downtown section were damaged or destroyed in the 1935 Helena earthquake.

Helena's early commercial district was located along State, Edwards, and Broadway Streets, but fires destroyed much of this area in 1869, 1872, and 1874. Much of what was built afterwards was built in the Western Commercial style, with splendid brickwork and simple lines. The Beaux Arts Parchen Drug Building, Colwell Building, and the Penn-Block Bristol Hotel were French Renaissance. The Denver Block and Sands Brothers Dry Goods were Romanesque Revival. By the mid-1880s at least 18 architectural firms had been established in Helena or called in from back East. Several of these architects were part of or influenced by the Chicago school of architecture. This influence is seen in the Atlas Building, Securities Building, Power Block, and the Lewis and Clark County Courthouse.

The most significant changes to the area occurred in the early 1970s, when a major urban renewal project demolished about 240 buildings within the original Helena Historic District –61 of which were of historical significance, and most which were commercial; they had been concentrated in the southeastern section of the district. The architectural and historical building survey initiated prior to the project was later deemed incomplete, and the decision to destroy many buildings of "indisputable historic and architectural significance" created significant controversy in the community. Urban renewal was viewed by many locals as a "disaster" equal to the 1935 earthquake, as many "insipid" new buildings were put on in the place of demolished historic structures. However, many historically significant buildings are still standing today including the Atlas block, the Securities building, the Placer Hotel, the Iron Front hotel and the Montana Club.

== West Residential section ==
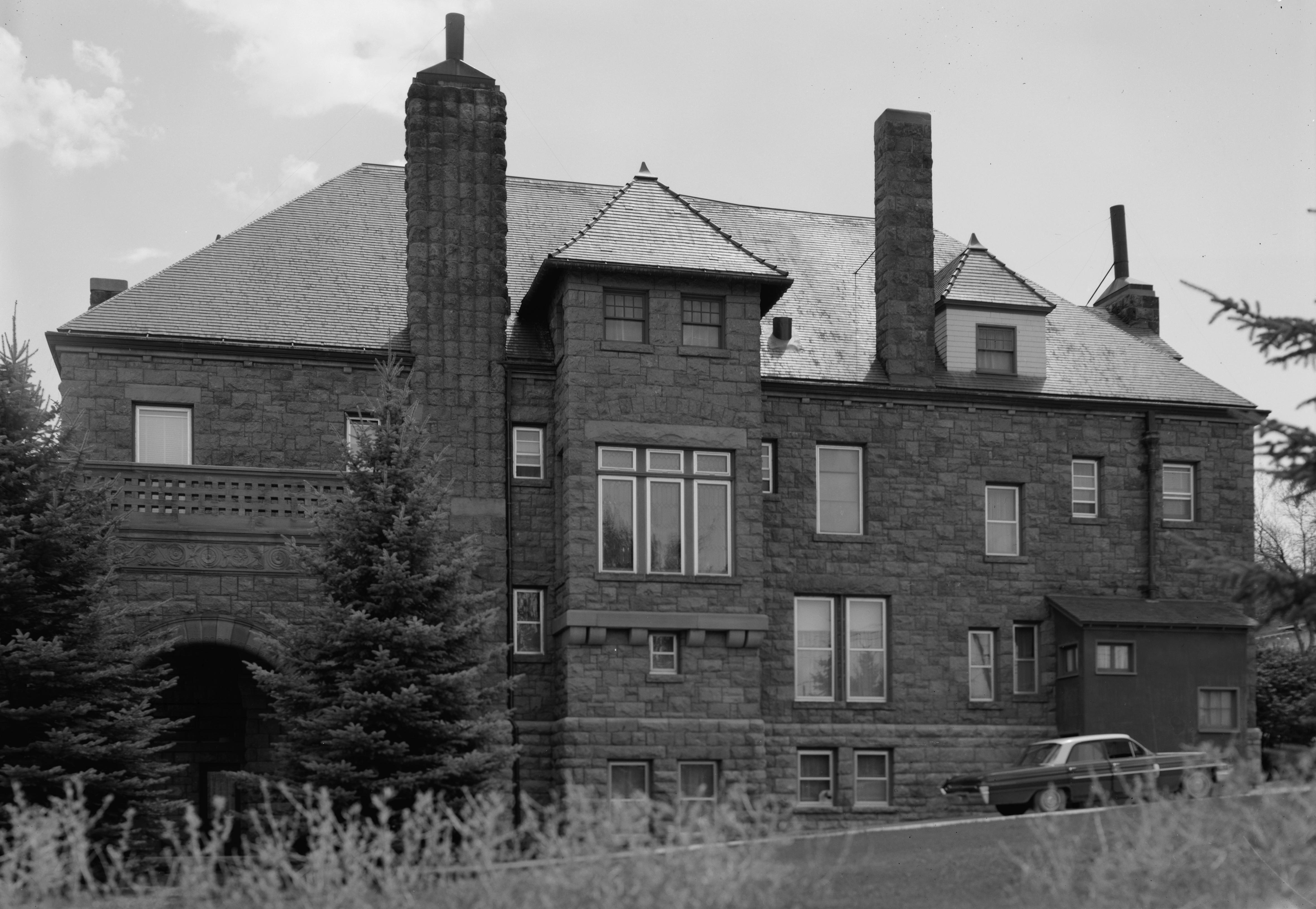
T.C. Power Mansion, within the residential section

The West Residential section is located on the lower slopes of Mount Helena, west of the downtown area. The streets in this section are lined with trees and stone walls, and many homes date from the last quarter of the 19th century. Mansions in this section include those once owned by United States Senator Thomas C. Power, B. H. Tatum, D. A. G. Floweree, and S. T. Hauser. The architecture of these homes is quite varied.

== Urban Renewal and the boundary increase of 1990 ==
When over 240 buildings within the original Helena Historic District were demolished due to urban renewal, the southeastern section where the demolition of the 1970s was the greatest was delisted, and a roughly 5-block area north of the original downtown district was added in 1990. The residential sections boundaries were not altered at that time, although the construction of Cruse Avenue, a wide, modern street intended to be a traffic bypass, split the residential district from the downtown. St. Peter's Episcopal Cathedral and the First Unitarian Church (now Grandstreet Theater) were included in this amended district. The boundary change also resulted in the period of significance being extended from 1900 to 1948 to reflect the significant early 20th century changes to the area. In addition, the south end of Last Chance Gulch was closed off and a pedestrian walking mall was created.

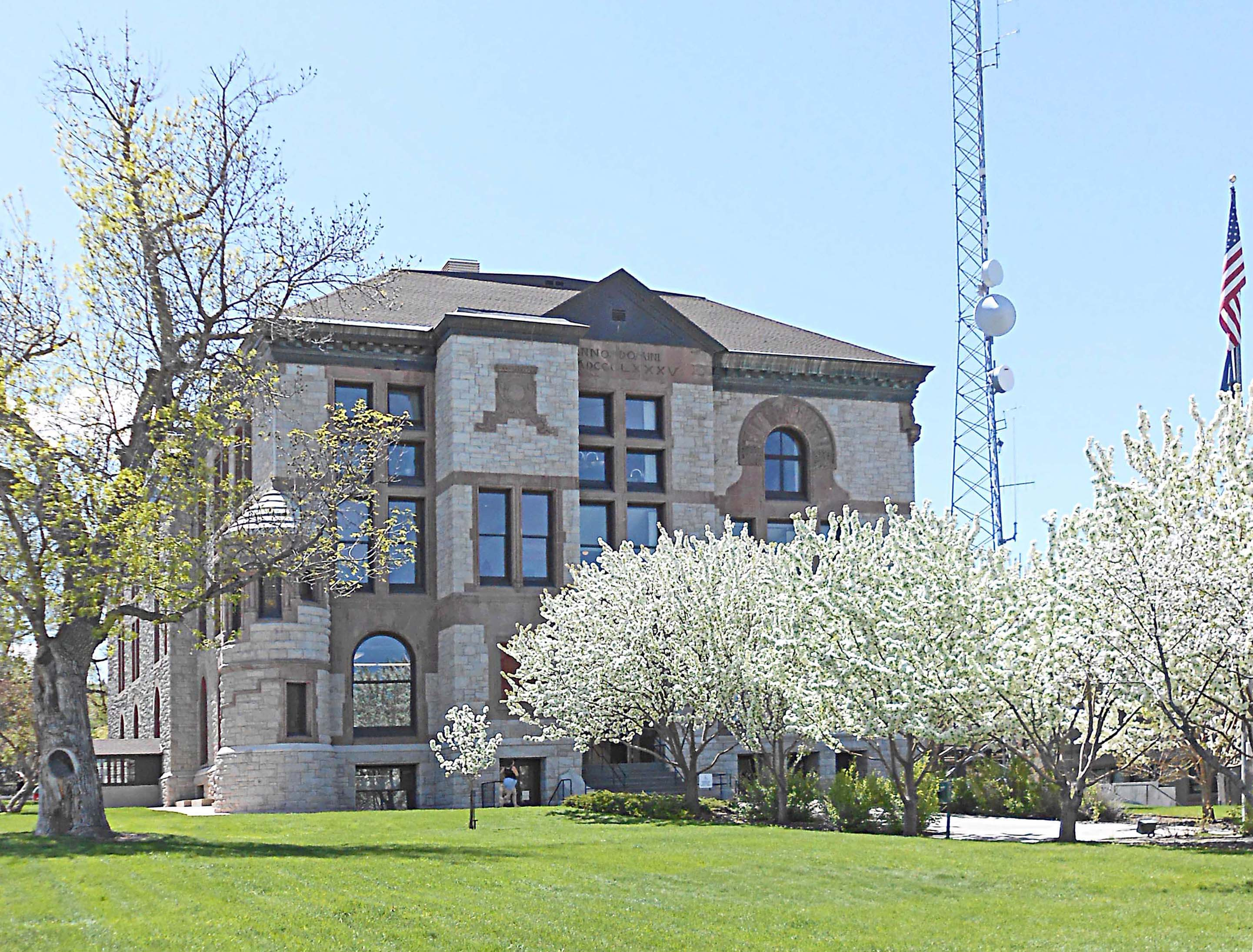
Lewis and Clark County Courthouse

Historic buildings and areas lost in urban renewal included the razing of 150 buildings in a seven block area and the former Wall street being completely eliminated. This area was infilled with three modern buildings and a park. This demolition also resulted in the loss of west State street and what remained of Helena's Chinatown, the Electric Block, the Helena YMCA, the Novelty Block, Homer block, and the most controversial demolition, the Marlow Theater.

== Boundary increase of 1993 ==
Approximately three blocks of mixed commercial and residential buildings centered on North Rodney Street, east of the earlier downtown section, were added to the district in 1993. They represent a period of development from 1878 to 1948. Many of these structures were built in the late 1800s in an effort to move to an area considered safer than those ravaged by the earlier Helena fires. Several commercial structures here were built by members of Helena's Jewish business community. This activity, and the Jewish population peaked in the 1890s, and was halted by the Panic of 1893. Limited construction began again after 1900 and continued slowly for the next few decades, but by 1929, there were no Jewish-owned buildings or residences in the neighborhood.

== See also ==
- Temple Emanu-El (Helena, Montana)
- National Register of Historic Places listings in Lewis and Clark County, Montana
