= Anson Rogers Graves =

American Episcopal bishop

The Right Reverend Anson Rogers Graves
- Western Nebraska
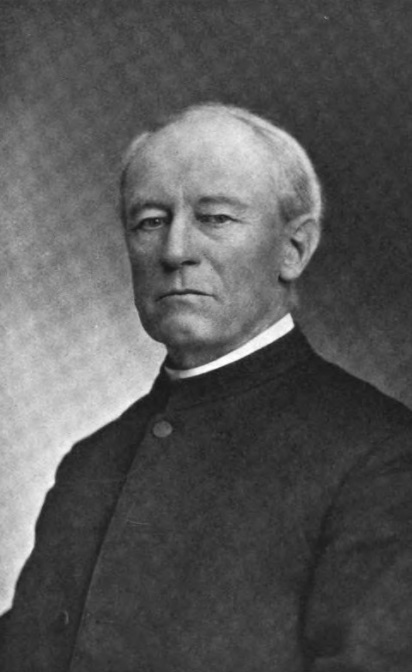
- Province: The Episcopal Church
- Diocese: Western Nebraska

Orders
- Ordination: June 4, 1871
- Consecration: January 1, 1890

Personal details
- Born: January 13, 1842 Wells, Vermont
- Died: December 30, 1931 (aged 89) La Mesa, California

Anson Rogers Graves (April 13, 1842 – December 30, 1931) was the first bishop of the Missionary District of Western Nebraska in The Episcopal Church.

== Biography ==
Anson Rogers Graves was born in Wells, Vermont on April 13, 1842.

Anson Rogers Graves was consecrated as an Episcopal Church bishop to the Missionary Diocese of The Plate (Western Nebraska) on January 1, 1890, by Daniel Sylvester Tuttle and others. He resigned in 1910.

He was the father of college football player and coach Eliot Graves.

He died at his home in La Mesa, California on December 30, 1931.
