= William F. Faber (bishop) =

American Episcopalian bishop (1860–1934)

The Right Reverend William F. Faber
- Bishop of Montana
- Faber, c. 1915
- Church: Episcopal Church
- Diocese: Montana
- In office: 1916–1934
- Predecessor: Leigh Richmond Brewer
- Successor: Herbert H. H. Fox
- Previous post: Coadjutor Bishop of Montana (1914–1916)

Orders
- Ordination: May 20, 1894 by Arthur Cleveland Coxe
- Consecration: November 10, 1914 by Daniel S. Tuttle

Personal details
- Born: February 27, 1860 Buffalo, New York, U.S.
- Died: July 20, 1934 (aged 74) Glacier National Park, Montana, U.S.
- Denomination: Anglican (prev. Presbyterian)
- Parents: Theobald Faber & Caroline W. Schoenthal
- Spouse: Dorothea J. Kniest (m. 1883)
- Children: 2
- Education: Hobart College

William Frederic Faber (February 27, 1860 – July 20, 1934) was an American prelate of the Episcopal Church, who served as the Bishop of Montana from 1916 to 1934.

== Early life and education ==
Faber was born at Buffalo, New York, on February 27, 1860, the son of Theobald Faber and Caroline W. Schoenthal. He attended public schools in Buffalo and graduated from the University of Rochester in 1880. He attended Auburn Theological Seminary from 1880 to 1883. He graduated with a Masters of Arts from Hobart College in 1898 and gained a Doctorate of Divinity from the University of Rochester in 1905.

== Ordained ministry ==
On July 8, 1883, Faber was ordained priest in the Presbyterian Church. He joined the Episcopal Church in 1892, becoming an Episcopal priest on May 20, 1894, and serving his ordination as assistant of St Peter's Church in Geneva, New York. In 1893 he was appointed as rector of Grace Church in Lockport, New York. From 1905 till 1914 he served as rector of St John's Church in Detroit.

== Bishop ==
In 1914, Faber was elected Coadjutor Bishop of Montana and succeeded as diocesan in 1916 after the death of Bishop Leigh Richmond Brewer.

== Death ==
On July 23, 1934, the body of Bishop Faber was discovered in Glacier National Park in Montana after he got lost. Bishop Faber had been missing since July 20. His body was discovered by Ranger Clyde Fauley.

== Personal life ==
Faber married Dorothea Jeannette Kniest of Buffalo on June 26, 1883; they had two children. Dorothea died in 1895.
