= Province 6 of the Episcopal Church =

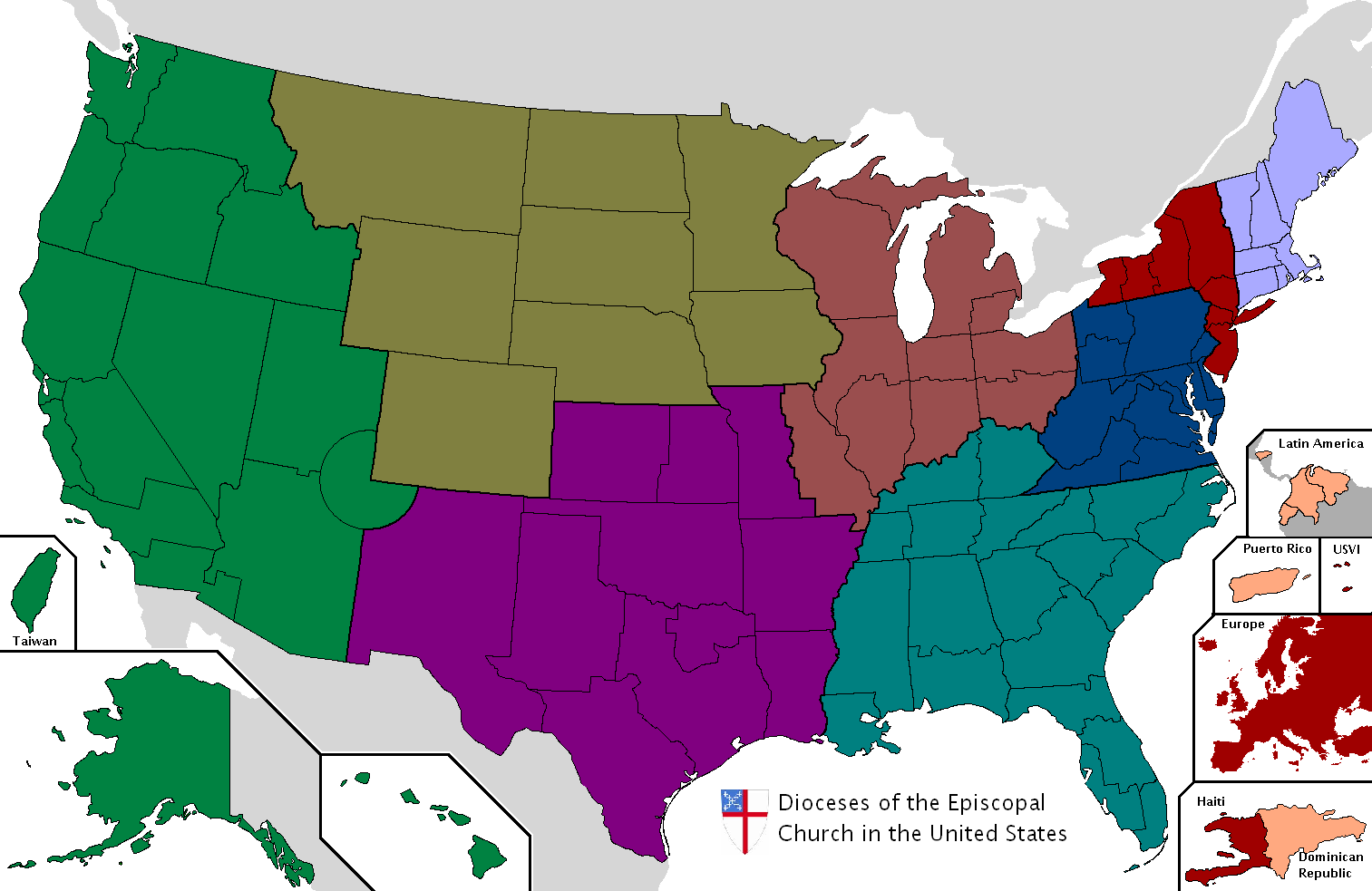
Province VI of the ECUSA

Province 6 (VI), also called the Province of the Northwest, is one of nine ecclesiastical provinces making up the Episcopal Church in the United States of America. It is composed of eight dioceses, one for each of the eight states of Colorado, Iowa, Minnesota, Montana, Nebraska, North Dakota, South Dakota, and Wyoming. (The boundaries of some dioceses are slightly different from the corresponding states, however.) Bishop Brian Prior of the Diocese of Minnesota serves as President and Lelanda Lee of the Diocese of Colorado serves as Vice President.

Statistically, the province reported 82,794 members in 2015 and 57,924 members in 2025. Plate and pledge income for the 461 filing congregations of the province in 2025 was $60,814,080. Average Sunday attendance (ASA) for 2025 was 18,235 persons. This was a relative decrease from ASA of 26,412 persons reported across the dioceses in 2015.

== Dioceses of Province VI ==
- Diocese of Colorado
- Diocese of Iowa
- Diocese of Minnesota
- Diocese of Montana
- Diocese of Nebraska
- Diocese of North Dakota
- Diocese of South Dakota
- Diocese of Wyoming
