= Robert Harper Clarkson =

American bishop

The Right Reverend Robert Harper Clarkson D.D., LL.D.
- Bishop of Nebraska
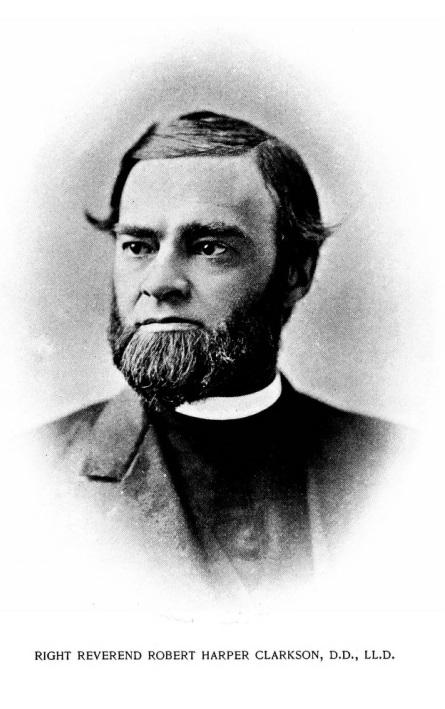
- Church: Episcopal Church
- Diocese: Nebraska
- Elected: October 23, 1865
- In office: 1865–1884
- Successor: George Worthington

Orders
- Ordination: January 5, 1851 by Philander Chase
- Consecration: November 15, 1865 by John Henry Hopkins

Personal details
- Born: November 19, 1826 Gettysburg, Pennsylvania, United States
- Died: March 10, 1884 (aged 57) Omaha, Nebraska, United States
- Buried: Trinity Cathedral
- Denomination: Anglican
- Parents: Michael Cook Clarkson & Louisa Harper
- Spouse: Meliora McPherson (m. 1849)
- Children: 2

Robert Harper Clarkson (November 19, 1826 – March 10, 1884) was an American prelate of the Episcopal Church, who served as the first Bishop of Nebraska between 1865 and 1884.

== Biography ==
Clarkson was born in Gettysburg, Pennsylvania. He was ordained deacon on June 18, 1848, by Bishop William Rollinson Whittingham of Maryland, and priest on January 5, 1851, by Presiding Bishop Philander Chase. He married Meliora McPherson on May 18, 1849. They had two daughters, Mary and Nellie.

He arrived in Chicago with his new wife at the time of the 1849 Chicago cholera outbreak that killed 678 people. Although some other clergymen fled the city, he stayed and ministered to the sick and buried the dead, until he came down with cholera himself.

He was consecrated Missionary Bishop of Nebraska and Dakota on November 15, 1865.

Clarkson received a B.A. from Pennsylvania College in 1844, a B.D. from St James' College in Hagerstown, Maryland, and a D.D. from Racine College in 1857 while rector of St. James's Episcopal Church, Chicago, Illinois. He received an LL.D. from the University of Nebraska in 1872.

He helped establish the first Christian missions to the Ponca Indians.

During his time as bishop, he was responsible for building fifty churches in his diocese and Clarkson Memorial Hospital (originally a children's hospital). he was instrumental in establishing the Trinity Cathedral in Omaha. This Late Gothic Revival cathedral was consecrated on November 15, 1883, and was added to the National Register of Historic Places in 1974.
