= C. Franklin Brookhart Jr. =

American Anglican bishop

The Right Reverend Charles Franklin Brookhart Jr D.Min.
- Retired Bishop of Montana
- Church: Episcopal Church
- Diocese: Montana
- Elected: May 17, 2003
- In office: 2003–2018
- Predecessor: Charles Irving Jones III
- Successor: Martha Elizabeth Stebbins

Orders
- Ordination: 1974
- Consecration: September 27, 2003 by Frank Griswold

Personal details
- Born: August 30, 1948 (age 78) Ohio, United States
- Denomination: Anglican
- Spouse: Susan Moyer Brookhart
- Children: 2
- Education: United Lutheran Seminary

Charles Franklin Brookhart Jr. (born August 30, 1948) served as the ninth bishop of the Episcopal Diocese of Montana. He retired as Bishop of Montana on November 1, 2018, and currently lives in Los Angeles and continues to preach, teach, and write. He assists as a bishop and resides within the Episcopal Diocese of Los Angeles.

== Biography ==
Brookhart was born in Parkersburg, West Virginia. He received a Master of Divinity degree from United Lutheran Seminary, Philadelphia. His Doctor of Ministry in homiletics was conferred by United Theological Seminary in 1984. He has served as an adjunct instructor at United Theological Seminary, Dayton, Ohio, and at Wheeling Jesuit University, where he taught scripture at both undergraduate and graduate levels.

He served four churches in Ohio and West Virginia, as a member and president of the Standing Committee, chair of the evangelism committee, and chair of the Search Committee for the seventh Bishop of West Virginia. Prior to his episcopal election in 2003, he served as rector of Lawrencefield Parish Church in Wheeling, West Virginia. He was consecrated on September 27, 2003, in St Helena's Cathedra, Helena, Montana. While serving as Bishop of Montana, he also was appointed co-chair of the Episcopal-United Methodist Dialogue and was a member of the international Anglican-Methodist Dialogue.

As bishop, his significant developments include: a capital fund drive to benefit the diocesan church camp; initiation of Native American ministry; reorganization of finances and structure; revitalization of the diaconate; and a marked increase in giving.

He is married to Dr. Susan Brookhart, an educational consultant. They have two adult daughters.

== Bibliography ==
- Living the Resurrection: Reflections After Easter (Morehouse Publishing, 2012) ISBN 9780819227959
- (editor) That They May Be One? The Episcopal United Methodist Dialogue (Seabury Books)
- Journey with Jesus: Encountering Christ in His Birth, Baptism, Death, and Resurrection (2016) ISBN 9781498280754
- The Language of Love: A Basic Christian Vocabulary (2018) ISBN 9781532650611
- Washed and Well-Fed: How the Sacraments Change Everything (2021) ISBN 9781725287426

== See also ==
- List of Episcopal bishops of the United States
- Historical list of the Episcopal bishops of the United States
