= Episcopal Diocese of Nebraska =

Diocese of the Episcopal Church in the United States

Diocese of Nebraska Diœcesis Nebraskensis
- Bishop's Seal - Episcopal Diocese of Nebraska

Location
- Country: United States
- Territory: Nebraska
- Ecclesiastical province: Province VI

Statistics
- Congregations: 50 (2024)
- Members: 5,860 (2023)

Information
- Denomination: Episcopal church
- Established: September 9, 1868
- Cathedral: Trinity Cathedral
- Co-cathedral: St Mark's Pro-Cathedral

Current leadership
- Bishop: Joseph Scott Barker

Website
- episcopal-ne.org

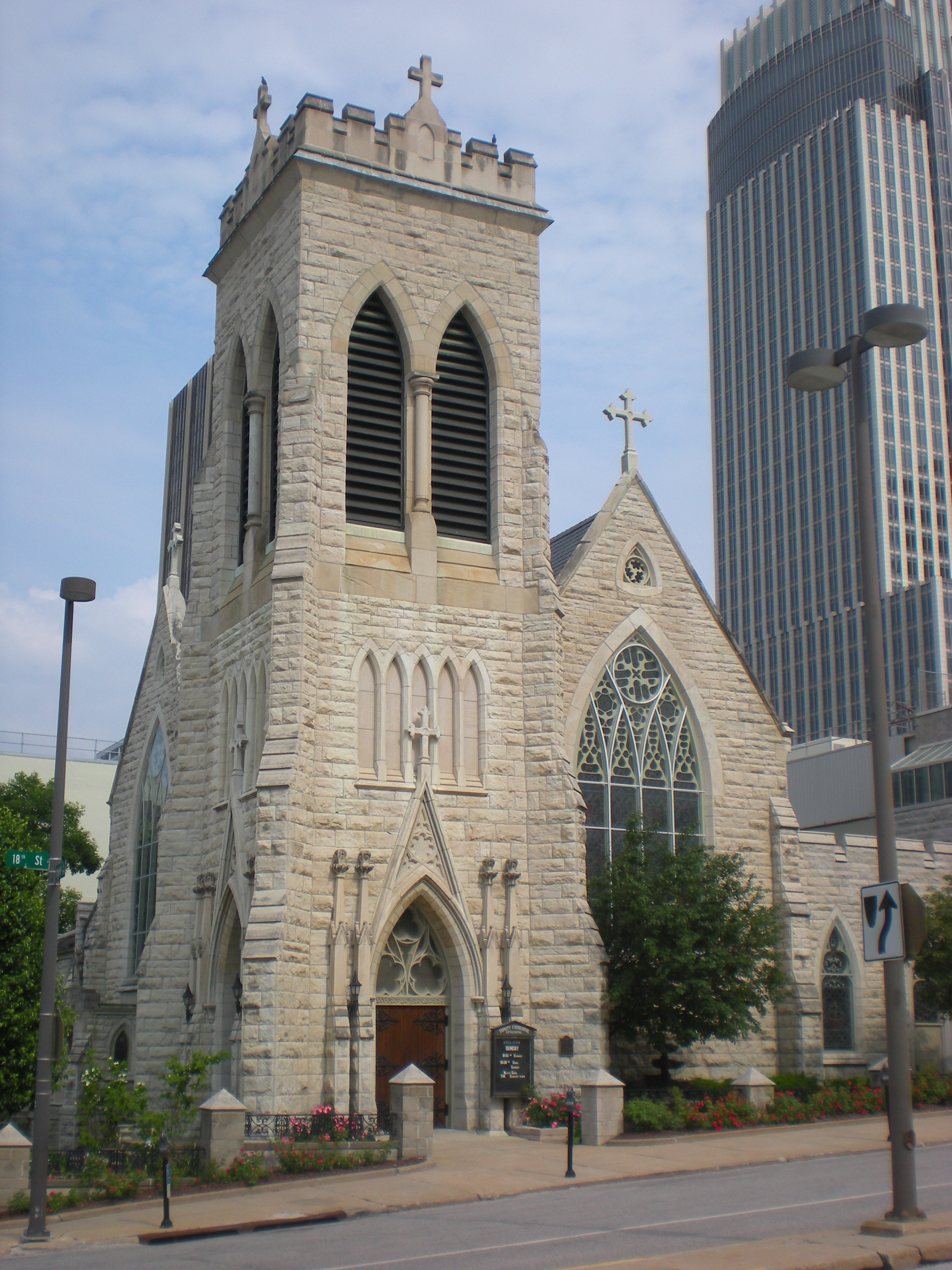
Trinity Cathedral, Omaha

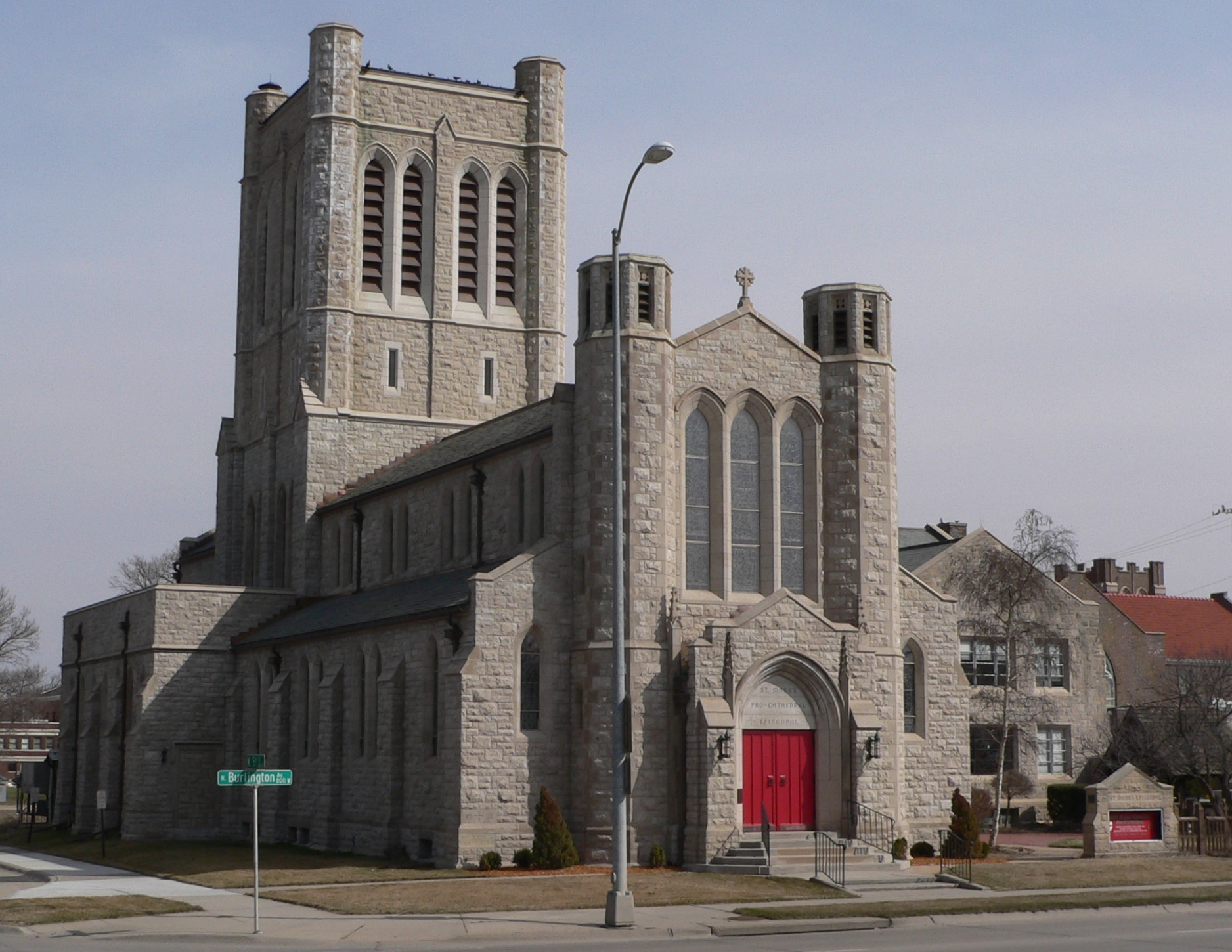
St. Mark's Pro-Cathedral, Hastings

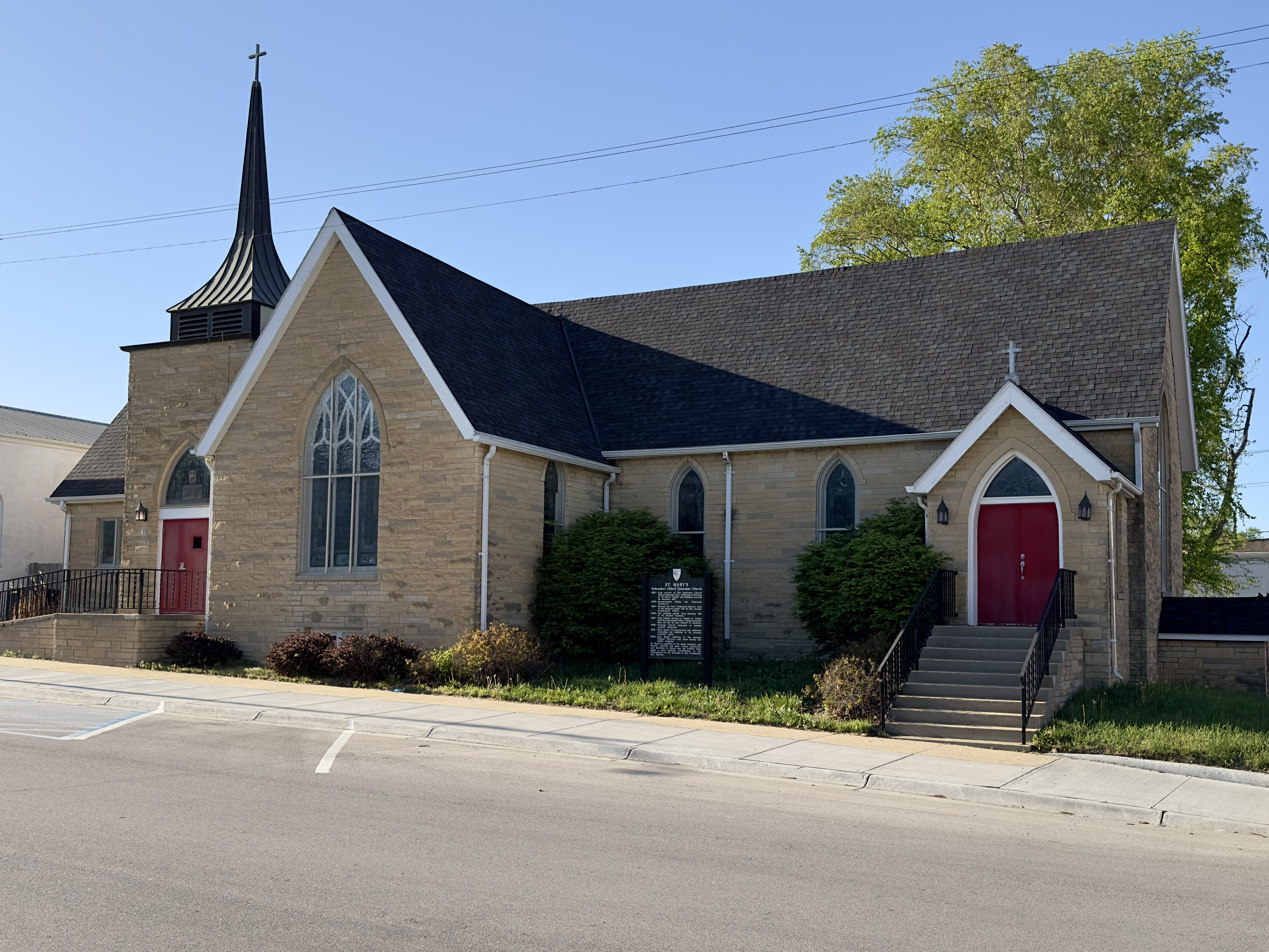
St. Mary's church in Nebraska City

The Episcopal Diocese of Nebraska is the diocese of the Episcopal Church in the United States of America with jurisdiction over the state of Nebraska. It is in Province VI. Its cathedral, Trinity Episcopal Cathedral, is in Omaha, as are the diocese's offices. In 2024, the diocese reported average Sunday attendance (ASA) of 1,747 persons; this was a relative decrease from 2,570 in 2017. The most recent membership statistics (2023) showed 5,860 members, a decrease from 7,304 in 2016. Plate and pledge income for the 50 filing congregations of the diocese in 2024 was $5,126,507. No membership statistics were reported in 2024 national parochial reports.

== Bishops ==
1. Robert Harper Clarkson (1865-1884)
2. George Worthington (1885-1908)
3. Arthur Llewllyn Williams (1908-1919)
4. Ernest Vincent Shayler (1919-1938)
5. Howard R. Brinker (1940-1962)
6. Russell T. Rauscher (1962-1972)
7. Robert P. Varley (1972-1975)
8. James D. Warner (1976-1989)
9. James E. Krotz (1989-2002)
10. Joe Goodwin Burnett (2003-2011)
11. Joseph Scott Barker (2011–present)

Following the resignation of Joe G. Burnett, J. Scott Barker was consecrated as bishop in October 2011. His election was held during a special diocesan council meeting held at St. Mark's Pro-Cathedral in Hastings, Nebraska.

== History of the Diocese of Nebraska ==
=== Earliest History ===
While it is certain that men and women associated with the Episcopal Church were included among the earliest explorers and settlers of the territory that came to be called Nebraska, it is unknown who those first Episcopalians might have been and where in the territory they might first have led worship services from the Book of Common Prayer. The first Episcopal clergyman known to have served in the Nebraska territory was the Rev. James DePui, a Chaplain at Ft. Kearney.

=== Earliest Parishes ===
In 1856 several churchmen in Omaha city requested the Bishop of Iowa visit them and consult about forming a parish. The Rev. Dr. Edward Peet arrived April 12, 1856, and met with 8 or 10 churchmen who organized a parish under the name of Trinity Church. On Sunday, April 13, Dr. Peet conducted the first known service of the Episcopal Church in Omaha.

In the autumn of 1857 an Episcopal missionary, the Rev. Mr. Eli Adams, came to Nebraska City and organized a parish under the name of St. Mary's. Having accepted a call from the vestry to be the rector, Adams went east to spend the winter. He returned in the spring of 1858 and found the parish had not been incorporated. On July 4, 1858, at the morning service the little congregation of pioneers adopted the following preamble: "We whose names are hereto affixed, deeply sensible of the truth of the Christian religion, and earnestly desirous of promoting its holy influences in our hearts and in those of our families and neighbors, do hereby incorporate ourselves under the name of St. Mary's Parish in Nebraska City, Nebraska Territory in communion with the Protestant Episcopal Church in the United States."

=== The Earliest Bishops ===
The Episcopal Church General Convention of 1838 tasked the great Missionary Bishop, Jackson Kemper with jurisdiction over, "the Territories of Wisconsin and Iowa and in all other parts of the United States north of latitude 36 1/2 where the Church is as yet unorganized." That included the area that came to be known as Nebraska.

Following Bishop Jackson Kemper, the Rt. Rev. Joseph C. Talbot served as a missionary bishop to the west. Kemper was the first bishop of the Episcopal Church with exclusive jurisdiction west of the Missouri River (parts of Kemper's missionary territories were located further east.) Bishop Talbot made Nebraska City (and St. Mary's) his home for five years beginning in 1860, during which time he laid foundations for the Episcopal Church's later work in his vast jurisdiction which included the present states of Nebraska, North Dakota, South Dakota, Montana, Wyoming, Colorado, Utah, Nevada, Oregon, Washington, and California.

=== Nebraska’s “First” Bishop ===
Because he was appointed to serve a smaller and distinct area of the U.S. (Nebraska and the Dakotas) and because he made Nebraska his permanent home and seat, Robert Harper Clarkson is remembered as the first bishop of Nebraska.

Clarkson was born on November 19, 1826, in Gettysburg, Pennsylvania, and received a B.A. from Pennsylvania College in 1844. He was ordained deacon on June 18, 1848, and priest on January 5, 1851. He married Meliora McPherson on May 18, 1849. They had two daughters, Mary and Nellie.

In his earliest days of ministry, Clarkson and his spouse lived in Chicago, Illinois. They were in the city during the days of the 1849 Chicago cholera outbreak that killed 678 people. Although some other clergymen fled the city, Clarkson stayed to minister to the sick and bury the dead. He went on to earn a D.D. from Racine College which was awarded in 1857 while he was serving as the rector of St. James's Episcopal Church in Chicago.

Clarkson was consecrated Missionary Bishop of Nebraska and Dakota on November 15, 1865. During his ministry in Nebraska, Clarkson helped establish the first Christian missions to the Ponca Indians and was responsible for building fifty churches in his diocese as well as a children's hospital.

Clarkson designated Trinity Church in Omaha as his cathedral and soon determined to improve that physical plant. He laid the cornerstone for the current cathedral building on May 25, 1880. Trinity served as the base of many Episcopal missions to areas of the western United States and remains today the episcopal seat of the Bishop of Nebraska.

Clarkson received an LL.D. from the University of Nebraska in 1872.

He died on March 10, 1884.

=== Western Nebraska ===
For almost sixty years there were 2 dioceses in the state of Nebraska. In 1889 the Missionary District of The Platte was split off from the Diocese of Nebraska at about mid-state. The first bishop of the diocese was Anson Rogers Graves who served from 1890 through 1910. During Bishops Graves tenure, the new diocese was renamed the Missionary District of Laramie, and later the Missionary District of Kearney.

In 1910, George Allan Beecher became the second bishop of the western diocese. During Beecher's tenure, which lasted until 1943, the diocese was again renamed. It became the Missionary District of Western Nebraska. In 1918, Beecher designated St. Mark's Church in Hastings as Pro-Cathedral for the Western Nebraska district.

In 1946, the Diocese of Western Nebraska was re-absorbed into the Diocese of Nebraska. Saint Mark's in Hastings is still the Pro-Cathedral of the Diocese of Nebraska.
