= James E. Krotz =

James Edward Krotz (born in 1948) is an American bishop. He was the ninth bishop of the Episcopal Diocese of Nebraska, serving from 1989 to 2003. He was previously rector of the Church of Our Savior in North Platte, Nebraska.
