= Trinity Cathedral (Omaha, Nebraska) =

Historic church in Nebraska, United States

- U.S. National Register of Historic Places
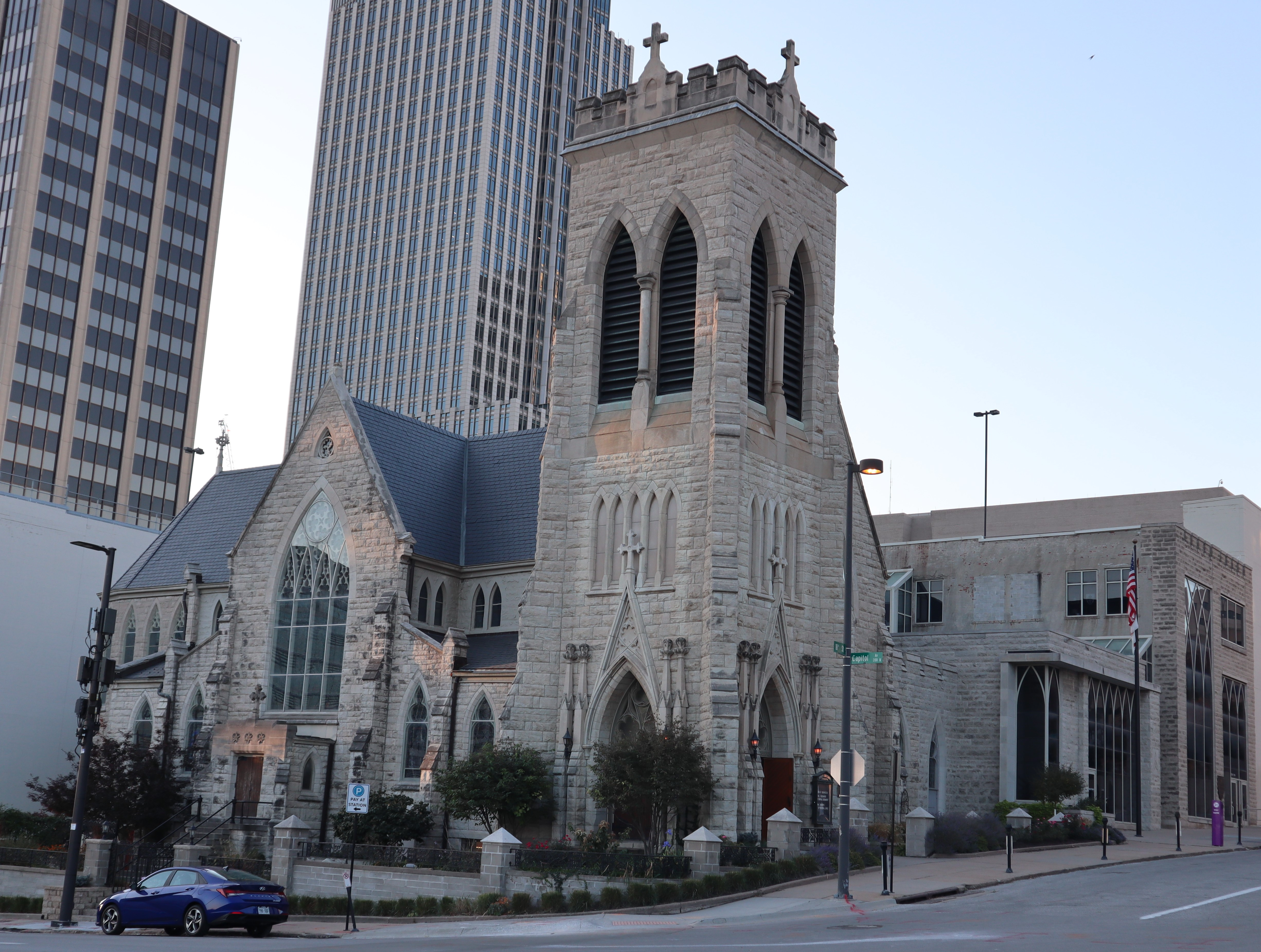
- The cathedral in 2024

- Location within Nebraska Location within the United States
- Location: 113 N. 18th Street, Omaha, Nebraska
- Coordinates: 41°15′37.36″N 95°56′21.79″W
- Built: 1880
- Architect: Henry G. Harrison, Alfred R. Dufrene
- Architectural style: Late Gothic Revival
- NRHP reference No.: 74001114
- Added to NRHP: August 7, 1974

Trinity Cathedral is located in Downtown Omaha, Nebraska. Nebraska's first Episcopal parish, Trinity was established in 1856, and became the state's first Episcopal cathedral in 1872. Designed by noted English architect Henry G. Harrison in 1880, the cathedral was consecrated on November 15, 1883. It was added to the National Register of Historic Places in 1974. Today Trinity Cathedral is considered one of the most beautiful churches in Omaha.

The cathedral reported 567 members in 2020 and 467 members in 2025. Plate and pledge income for the congregation in 2025 was $407,108 with average Sunday attendance (ASA) of 108. This was a relative decrease from ASA of 231 reported in 2017.

== History ==
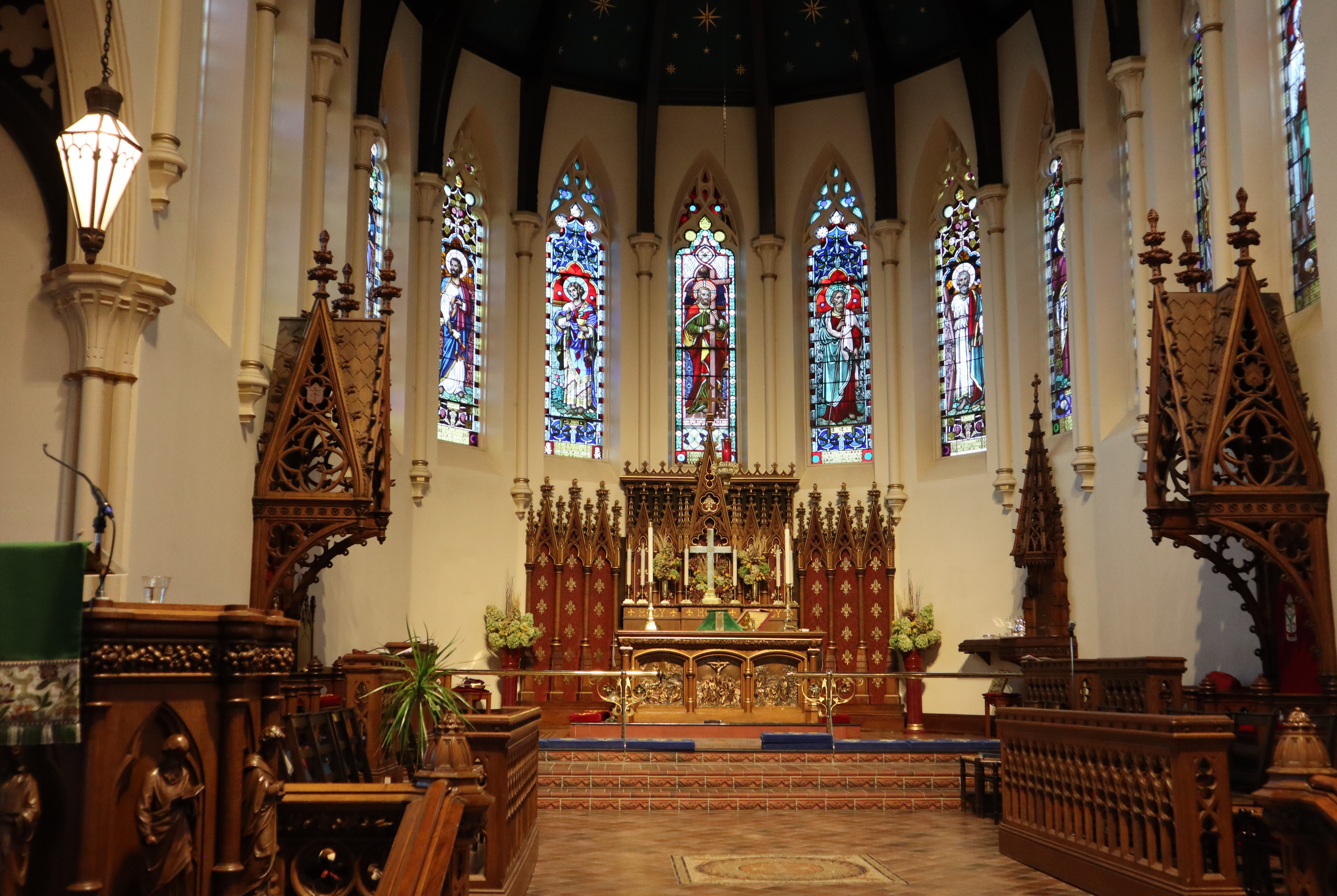
View inside the nave, looking toward the front

Trinity was organized by the Right Reverend David Jackson Kemper on July 13, 1856. The first church was built at South Ninth and Farnam Streets. The congregation lost control of the first church building in 1864; the second building was lost to fire in 1868. The third church was built the next year, and was used until the cathedral was constructed. The Right Reverend Robert Harper Clarkson broke ground for the new cathedral, later laying the cornerstone on May 25, 1880. The cost of the cathedral was about $100,000 by the time it was completed three years later.

The church served as the base of many Episcopal missions to areas of the western United States. It is the episcopal seat of the Bishop of the Episcopal Diocese of Nebraska.

== Design ==
It is built in the late Late Gothic Revival style, with rock-faced masonry walls and stone tracery over more than 43 stained glass lancet windows. The church is almost entirely of bluestone from Illinois, in a design that is nearly cruciform with an entry tower extending outward. The exterior of the building has more than six stone crosses at varying points of its roof line. Its design was influenced by the Oxford Movement in the Episcopal church, which led to a revival of medieval styles, as well as an interest in historic design at the time in United States architecture.

The interior features Gothic design throughout, including aisles, nave, transept, choir, and a clerestory. The church includes a noted carved oak bishop's throne and dean's stall.

== See also ==
- List of the Episcopal cathedrals of the United States
- List of cathedrals in the United States
