= Gardens at Heather Farm =

Gardens in Walnut Creek, California, US

The Gardens At Heather Farm
- Location within San Francisco Bay Area Location within California Location within the United States
- Type: Botanical garden
- Location: 1540 Marchbanks Drive, Walnut Creek, California
- Coordinates: 37°55′08″N 122°02′39″W
- Area: 6.5 acres (2.6 ha)
- Opened: 1968
- Visitors: 20,000
- Website: https://www.gardenshf.org/

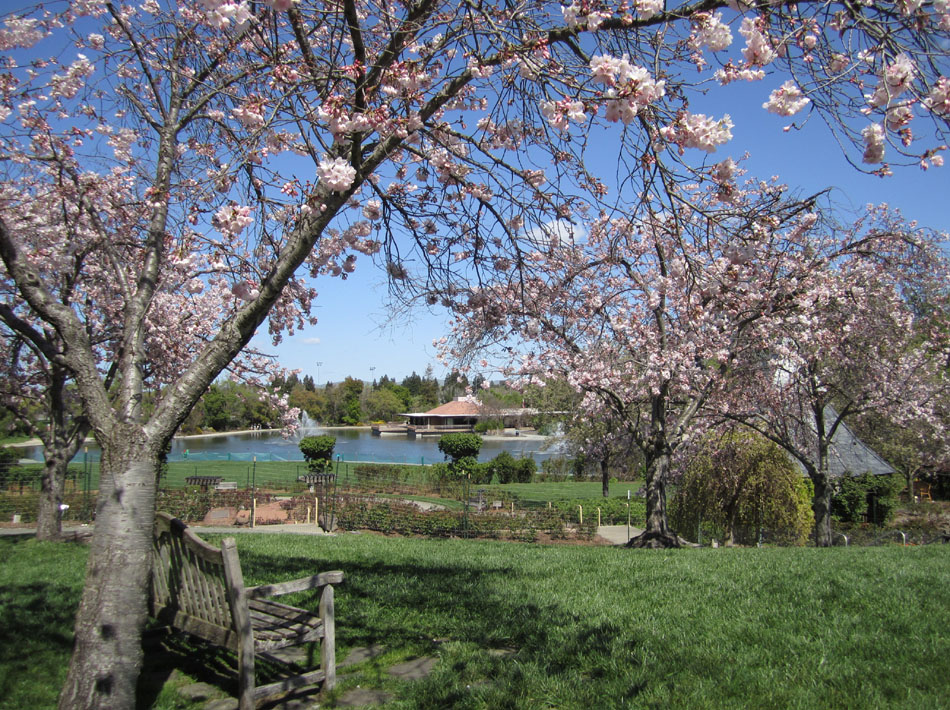
Ward Garden at Heather Farm Park

The 6.5-acre (2.6 ha) Gardens at Heather Farm are a set of gardens located at Heather Farm Park in Walnut Creek, California, United States. The gardens have a view of Mount Diablo, and are open to the public 7 days a week during daylight hours.

== History ==
In 1967, Walnut Creek city park director Ruth Wallis called a meeting with the presidents of three local garden clubs to discuss the possibility of a gardening association for Walnut Creek. This group then asked the city for the use of part of the planned Heather Farm Park. The Heather Farm Garden Center Association was incorporated in 1971. Members of HFGCA included Philip and Ruth Bancroft, who donated land for Heather Farm Park and founded the Ruth Bancroft Garden. A groundbreaking ceremony for the gardens was held on August 12, 1979. The HFGCA's headquarters, the Heather Farm Garden Center building, opened in 1983 after being funded by plant sales, donations, and grants.

== Gardens ==
Gardens at Heather Farm currently include:

- Black Pine Garden (1989) – a small garden, including a bonsai Japanese black pine, and bonsai Colorado blue spruce.
- Butterfly Garden (1996) – includes a hedge of escallonia with milkweed, passion vines, and Mexican sunflowers.
- Children's Garden (1990) – grapes and goldflame honeysuckle. Much of the garden is planted each spring with edible produce.
- Cowden Rose Garden (1991) – Gazebo with tea rose and floribunda roses, among a variety of rose displays.
- Diablo Ascent Garden (1996).
- Meadow Garden (1995) – rose hedge, background greenery, and conifers, with cape plumbago and pittosporum shrubs, and a hedge of Japanese rugosa shrub roses.
- Mother's Garden (1996) – a bench set under Raywood Ash trees in an allée overlooking the Rose Garden, with creeping thyme, rhaphiolepis, violets, variegated society garlic, dwarf plumbago, sweet alyssum, a bearded iris from Bancroft Garden, statice, St John's wort, and artemisia.
- Mural Garden (1990) – three African sumac trees, smoke tree, crape myrtles, a red horse chestnut tree, artemisia, verbena, strawberry trees, oleander, rockrose, berberis, verbena, gazania, thyme, coreopsis, and penstemon.
- Native Plant Garden (1983).
- Ree Display Grove (1995) – daffodils and twelve types of trees representing uncommon candidates for use in a home garden.
- Riparian Garden (1992) – original valley oak trees, corkscrew leaf willows, birch, purpleleaf plum, liquidambar, vine maple, hemerocallis, buddleia, and ochna.
- Rockery (1990) – an alpine garden, including miniature trees and conifers as well as perennials to emulate high elevation plantings. This garden contains plants suitable to Zone 14 that still appear alpine.
- Sensory Garden – raised beds, water fountain and more than 75 herbs and plants to smell and touch.
- Stroll Garden (1997).
- Ward Garden (1989) – a lawn of tall fescue grass, with five ornamental cherry trees.
- Water Conservation Garden (2004).
- Waterfall Garden (2000) – eleven waterfalls, ponds, and two bridges.

== See also ==
- List of botanical gardens in the United States
