= Heather Farm Park =

Public park in Walnut Creek, California, United States

Coordinates: 37°55′13″N 122°02′37″W

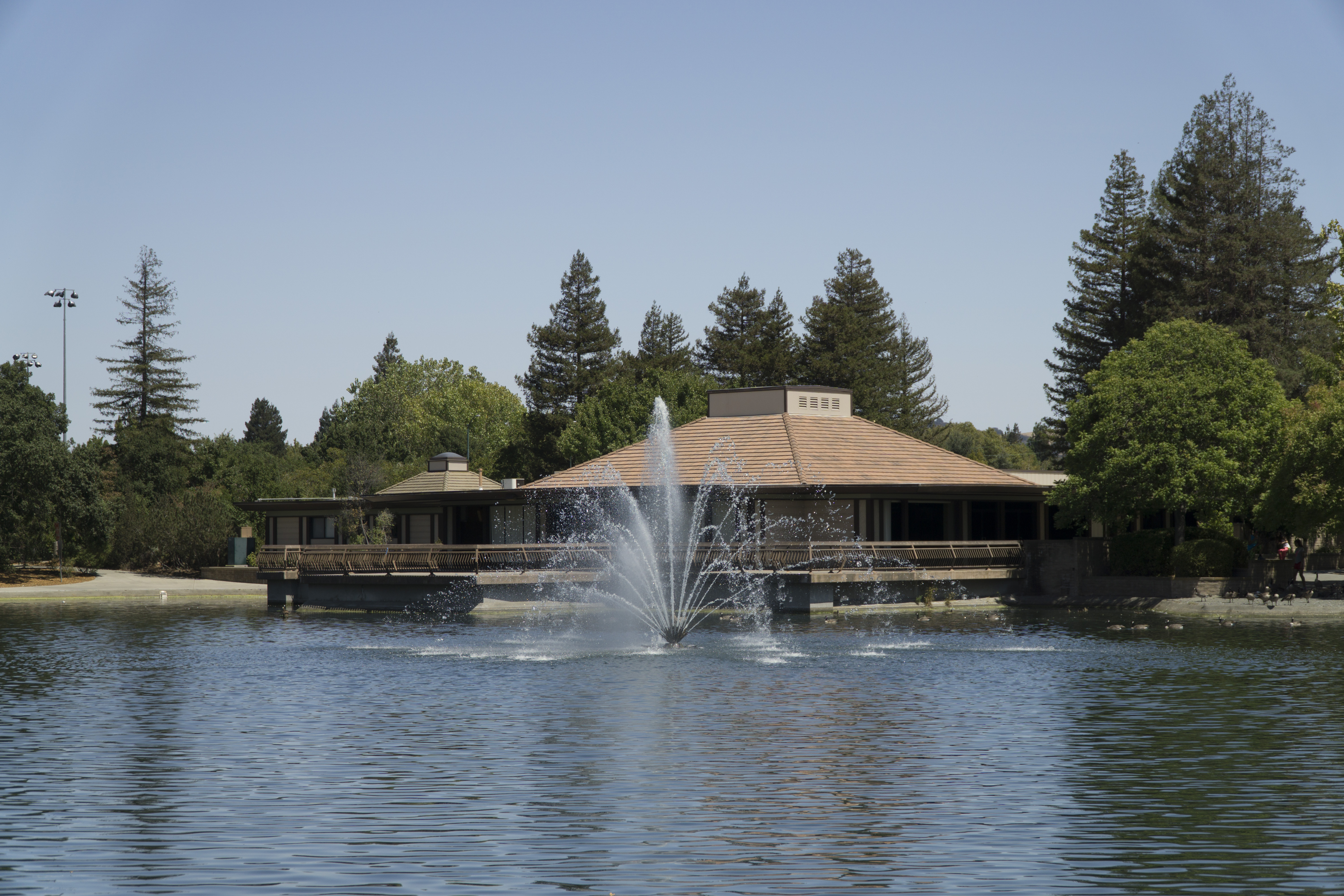
- Type: community park
- Location: N. San Carlos Dr, Walnut Creek, CA 94598
- Area: 102 acres
- Website: https://www.walnut-creek.org/Home/Components/FacilityDirectory/FacilityDirectory/51/665

Heather Farm Park is a 102-acre community park in Walnut Creek, California. It contains the Gardens at Heather Farm, a swimming pool, inclusive playground, sports fields, equestrian center, dog park, fishing pond, nature area, lake, and other amenities.

== History ==
In 1874, on the site of the current park was a health spa, Sulphur Springs Ranch. Race horse breeder John Marchbanks (also written as Marchbank) bought the property in 1921 and named it Heather Farm after his favorite horse, King Heather. An arena on the farm was used in the filming of the 1931 movie Sporting Blood.

In 1965, Walnut Creek voters approved a municipal bond to fund community parks. The city was able to purchase some of the land that had been Heather Farm, and also received five acres of land donated by Phil and Ruth Bancroft (whose garden became the nearby Ruth Bancroft Garden). Heather Farm Park opened in 1970.
