= Killing of Christian Glass =

2022 police shooting of motorist in the US

- Location: Clear Creek County, Colorado, U.S.
- Date: June 10–11, 2022 ≈ 12:30 am (MDT; UTC−6)
- Attack type: Homicide by shooting, police brutality
- Victims: Christian Glass, aged 22
- Perpetrators: Andrew Buen (shooter); Kyle Gould
- Accused: Six other officers charged with failing to intervene, charges dismissed
- Charges: Buen: Second degree murder; Official misconduct (Note: Charge dismissed after hung jury in first trial.); Reckless endangerment; Gould: Criminally negligent homicide and reckless endangerment (Note: Charges dropped after plea deal.)
- Verdict: Buen: First trial: Hung jury on murder and official misconduct; Guilty of reckless endangerment; Second trial: Guilty on the lesser included offense of criminally negligent homicide Gould: Pleaded guilty to failing to intervene, other charges dropped
- Convictions: Buen: Criminally negligent homicide and reckless endangerment Gould: Failing to intervene
- Sentence: Buen: 3 years in prison Gould: 2 years probation $1,000 fine

The killing of Christian Glass occurred on June 11, 2022, in Silver Plume, Colorado, when Glass, a 22-year-old triple citizen of the United States, New Zealand, and the United Kingdom, was shot and killed by Clear Creek County Sheriff's Deputy Andrew Buen. Glass had called 911 for roadside assistance after his vehicle became stuck, but a 70-minute standoff ensued after he exhibited signs of a mental health crisis and refused to exit his car.

In the aftermath of the shooting, eight law enforcement officers were criminally charged. In November 2023, former sergeant Kyle Gould pleaded guilty to misdemeanor charges of failing to intervene and failing to report the use of force. In February 2025, former deputy Andrew Buen, who fired the fatal shots, was convicted of criminally negligent homicide and reckless endangerment. He was sentenced to three years in prison, the maximum penalty allowed for the offense. Charges against six other responding officers were dismissed or dropped with conditions.

In May 2023, the Glass family reached a US$19 million settlement with the state of Colorado and local municipalities. The agreement mandated significant law enforcement reforms.

== Incident ==
=== 911 call ===
Glass called 911 at approximately 11:20 pm on June 10, 2022. In his nearly 25 minute call with the 911 operator, Glass said that "My vehicle got stuck in a really bad way. … I need immediate assistance, please", adding "I will not be fine on my own." He told her that his vehicle was stuck in a trap, that he was coming off of a depression, and he was worried about "skinwalkers". He said that "If I got out of the car, I might be in danger", and that he loved her being on the line with him while he was frightened.

He also told the 911 operator that he had two knives, a hammer, and a rubber mallet in the car, which he had as an amateur geologist. He said he would throw them out of the car as soon as the police arrived. He stated "I'm not dangerous. I will keep my hands completely visible. I understand this is a dodgy situation."

When relaying the call information to the police forces, the 911 operator described Glass as "very paranoid" and "not making much sense". Later on, the officers on the scene can be heard referring to a possible "psych issue".

=== Attempts to get Glass out of the vehicle ===
The episode was recorded on police body-cams. When the police arrived, they directed Glass to get out of the car, with their hands on their guns. Glass refused, saying that he was "terrified". He repeated the offer to throw the knives and mallet out of the car, but a Clear County deputy, Andrew Buen, told him not to and directed him to get out of the car. Glass put the keys to the vehicle on the dashboard and kept his hands visible. He threw a knife to the other side of the car.

For the next 70 minutes, the police tried to get Glass to get out of the vehicle. He said that staying in the vehicle was the only way he could be safe. More police officers arrived, until eventually officers from five different services were present, including police from Georgetown and Idaho Springs, and the Colorado State Patrol. At one point, an officer threatened to break the window of the car. Glass was seen praying with folded hands, saying "Dear Lord, please, don't let them break the window." After close to an hour, Glass was seen making a "heart" symbol with his hands towards the officer, and blowing kisses. A female voice was heard saying "Same back at you, but come on out and talk to us."

At some point, there was a conversation between the county police officers and officers of the Colorado State Patrol who had arrived on the scene. The Patrol officer asked them what "their plan is", adding "if he's committed no crime and is not suicidal, homicidal, or a great danger, then there is no reason to contact him." The officers on the scene continued to try to get Glass out of his vehicle.

=== Police kill Glass ===
After approximately 70 minutes, an officer states that they will break into Glass's vehicle, saying: "It’s time to move the night on — OK. We got to move." Buen smashed the front window of the car. Another officer stood on the hood of the vehicle, shining a flashlight on Glass. The officers are heard telling Glass to drop the knife. They then shot him with bean-bags and he began to flail about in the vehicle. An officer is heard saying "Someone tase his ass. Someone tase him!"

Buen then shot Glass with a stun gun. Glass began shouting hysterically, "Lord hear me. Lord hear me". An officer is then heard saying: "You can save yourself. You can still save yourself." After repeating requests to drop the knife, Deputy Buen then shot Glass with a handgun at least five times. Glass then appeared to turn toward an officer with a small knife in his hand and began stabbing himself before dropping the knife. The body-cam footage does not show Glass ever moving from the driver seat of the vehicle.

== Aftermath ==
=== Initial narratives and family response ===
On June 11, 2022, the Clear Creek County Sheriff's Office issued a statement that the motorist was "argumentative and uncooperative" and had armed himself with a knife. It stated that the officers tried for over an hour to reach a peaceful resolution before the deputies broke out the windows and removed a knife. Referring to Glass as "the suspect", it said that he re-armed himself with another knife and a rock. It said that the deputies used a bean-bag and a Taser, and then shot Glass when he tried to stab an officer.

Following the public release of body-worn camera footage in September 2022, Glass's parents, Simon and Sally Glass, who had moved the family to the U.S. from New Zealand during Christian's childhood, held a press conference labeling the killing a "murder". They asserted that the initial police narrative was "false in almost every respect" and that the footage showed their son in a state of terror rather than aggression. Sally Glass noted that her son was a geology enthusiast who was taking prescription medication for ADHD, arguing that the presence of seven armed officers exacerbated his mental health crisis. She also noted that Deputy Buen had remained armed and on active duty following the shooting. Undersheriff Bruce Snelling confirmed on September 15 that Buen had returned to work.

=== Official inquiries and misconduct allegations ===
The Colorado Bureau of Investigation (CBI) and Clear Creek County District Attorney Heidi McCollum launched an inquiry into the shooting shortly after the incident. McCollum coordinated with federal authorities, including the FBI and the Department of Justice, to monitor the case for potential civil rights violations.

Attorneys for the Glass family announced a civil action against the involved agencies. They stated that Glass had no history of violent behavior or serious mental illness, though he had been diagnosed with ADHD and depression. Additionally, they alleged that an officer tasked with investigating the scene had intentionally muted his body-worn camera.

The Sheriff's Office initially stated that Deputy Buen had no history of misconduct. However, it was later revealed a 2019 lawsuit had been filed by Manuel Camacho, who alleged that Buen used excessive force by placing him in a headlock and kneeling on his neck during an arrest. In February 2023, Clear Creek County settled Camacho's lawsuit for $15,000.

=== Official Positions ===
In September 2022, Clear Creek County Undersheriff Bruce Snelling defended the use of deadly force. Snelling stated that Deputy Andrew Buen fired his weapon because he believed Glass intended to stab an officer through the broken window of the vehicle after previous attempts to use a Taser had failed.

Governor Jared Polis also met with the Glass family to express condolences, later issuing a statement declaring that the tragedy "should never have happened" and noting that the state of Colorado mourned the loss of Glass's life.

== Autopsy ==
The coroner's report classified Glass's manner of death as a homicide and the cause of death as multiple gunshot wounds. The autopsy identified six gunshot wounds to his torso and upper right arm, noting no evidence of close-range fire. Other documented injuries included puncture sites consistent with electroshock weapon barbs, as well as blunt force and superficial sharp force injuries to the head, neck, and extremities.

Toxicology analysis detected a blood alcohol level of 0.010 alongside the presence of THC and amphetamines. Medical toxicologist Andrew Monte stated that the THC concentration indicated recent marijuana use, while the amphetamine level was consistent with a prescription for ADHD.

== Civil settlement and memorials ==
In May 2023, the Glass family reached a $19 million settlement with the state of Colorado, Clear Creek County, and the towns of Georgetown and Idaho Springs, the largest settlement for a police killing in Colorado history.

The settlement also mandated significant policy reforms. The Clear Creek County Sheriff's Office was required to establish a crisis intervention co-responder program and provide de-escalation training to its entire force. Furthermore, the agreement led to the creation of a statewide training video and the dedication of a public park in Glass's honor. The state of Colorado also agreed to display Glass's artwork in government buildings as a memorial to his life.

In October 2026, the Glass family opened Creative Grounds, an arts-focused youth center in Lyons, Colorado, in Christian's honor, funded by proceeds from the settlement.

== Criminal proceedings ==
=== Criminal trials and convictions ===
In November 2022, a grand jury indicted deputies Andrew Buen and Kyle Gould, both of whom were subsequently terminated. Gould was not at the scene when Glass was shot, but he authorized Buen's breaking of the window over the phone, according to the indictment.

In November 2023, Kyle Gould pleaded guilty to two misdemeanors, including failure to intervene and failure to report the use of force. In exchange for the plea, charges of negligent homicide and reckless endangerment were dropped. He was sentenced to two years of probation, a $1,000 fine, and was permanently stripped of his POST certification, barring him from working in law enforcement or security in Colorado.

Andrew Buen, the officer who fired the fatal shots, faced charges of second-degree murder, reckless endangerment, and official misconduct. His initial trial in April 2024 resulted in a conviction for reckless endangerment, but the jury deadlocked on the murder and misconduct charges. In February 2025, a jury found Buen guilty of criminally negligent homicide following a retrial. On April 14, 2025, he was sentenced to three years in prison, the maximum penalty allowed for the offense.

=== Charges against other officers ===
In November 2023, six additional officers who responded to the scene were charged with misdemeanor failure to intervene: Randy Williams and Timothy Collins of the Georgetown Police; Ryan Bennie of the Colorado State Patrol; Brittany Morrow of the Idaho Springs Police; and Christa Lloyd and Mary Harris of the Colorado Gaming Commission. Williams also faced a charge of misdemeanor third-degree assault.

By July 2025, the district attorney's office dismissed or dropped all charges against the six officers. As a condition of their dismissals, Morrow, Collins, and Bennie completed critical incident training and participated in a statewide training video. In the video, the officers discussed de-escalation techniques, the failures that led to the shooting, and how to properly assist individuals experiencing a mental health crisis.

== See also ==
- Killing of Elijah McClain
- Killing of Miles Mall
