= Ruth Bancroft =

American gardener

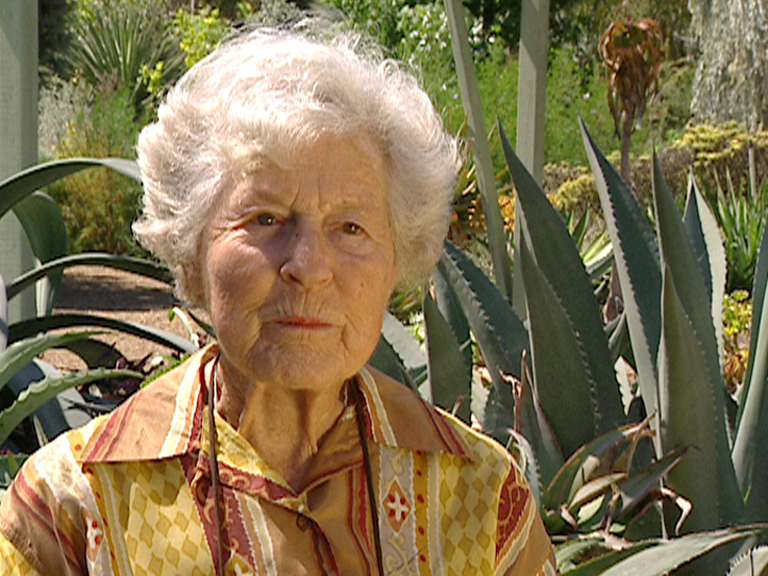
- Born: Ruth Petersson; September 2, 1908; Boston, Massachusetts, U.S.
- Died: November 26, 2017 (aged 109); Walnut Creek, California, U.S.
- Education: UC Berkeley (1932)
- Occupation(s): Teacher, gardener, landscape architect
- Notable work: Ruth Bancroft Garden
- Spouse: Philip Bancroft Jr. (m. 1939; died 1983)

Ruth Bancroft (née Petersson; September 2, 1908 – November 26, 2017) was the creator of the Ruth Bancroft Garden in Walnut Creek, California.

A resident of the Bay Area from childhood, Bancroft began the xeric garden in the 1950s on land originally purchased by Hubert Howe Bancroft, the grandfather of Ruth's husband, Philip Bancroft. The garden became the first in the United States to be preserved by The Garden Conservancy and has been open to the public since 1992.

== Early life and education ==
Ruth Petersson was born to Swedish immigrants in Boston on September 2, 1908. Her mother was a schoolteacher, and her father was a Latin professor. While Petersson was a baby, her family moved to Berkeley, California, when her father took a job at the University of California, Berkeley. The oldest of three children, Petersson had a younger sister and a younger brother, both born in California.

As a child, she was an avid reader. Her favorite book was Sibylle von Olfers's Root Children, a German children's book about anthropomorphized plant-children who bloom in spring and return to the earth in fall. Fascinated by nature, she explored the undeveloped hills of Berkeley, examining wildflowers and digging up small plants to replant in her own backyard. Her early garden included a collection of irises, which she received from Sydney B. Mitchell, the founder of the American Iris Association, and Carl Salbach, an iris breeder.

In 1926, Petersson enrolled in UC Berkeley with a major in architecture, as one of two women students in the program. Following the Wall Street crash of 1929, she left the architecture track and graduated with a teaching certificate in 1932. This career path offered greater job opportunities during a time when male architecture students struggled to find jobs and female architects were rare. She taught home economics at a school in Merced for eight years.

In the mid-1930s, Petersson met her future husband, Philip Bancroft Jr. on a blind date. Philip was the grandson of Hubert Howe Bancroft, a successful publisher whose book collection was purchased by UC Berkeley. The special collections library at UC Berkeley is known today as the Bancroft Library. Ruth Petersson and Philip Bancroft married on June 30, 1939. Petersson, now Ruth Bancroft, moved with her husband to his family's farm in Walnut Creek.

Bancroft began planting flowers in the beds surrounding the home. Fascinated by succulents, she clipped articles about the drought-resistant plants but did not acquire her own until the 1950s, when she purchased a few hybrids at the estate sale of Glenn Davidson, a furniture seller and plant breeder. These succulents, named Aeonium 'Glenn Davidson', were the first dry plants in her collection. Her collection expanded from Aeonium to include Agave, Aloe, Echeveria and cactus. She grew her plants in pots, then transplanting them to mounds of soil around her home.

Bancroft, her husband, and their children moved into the main home on the Bancroft farm in about 1954, when Bancroft's father-in-law, Philip Bancroft Sr., died.

== Ruth Bancroft Garden ==
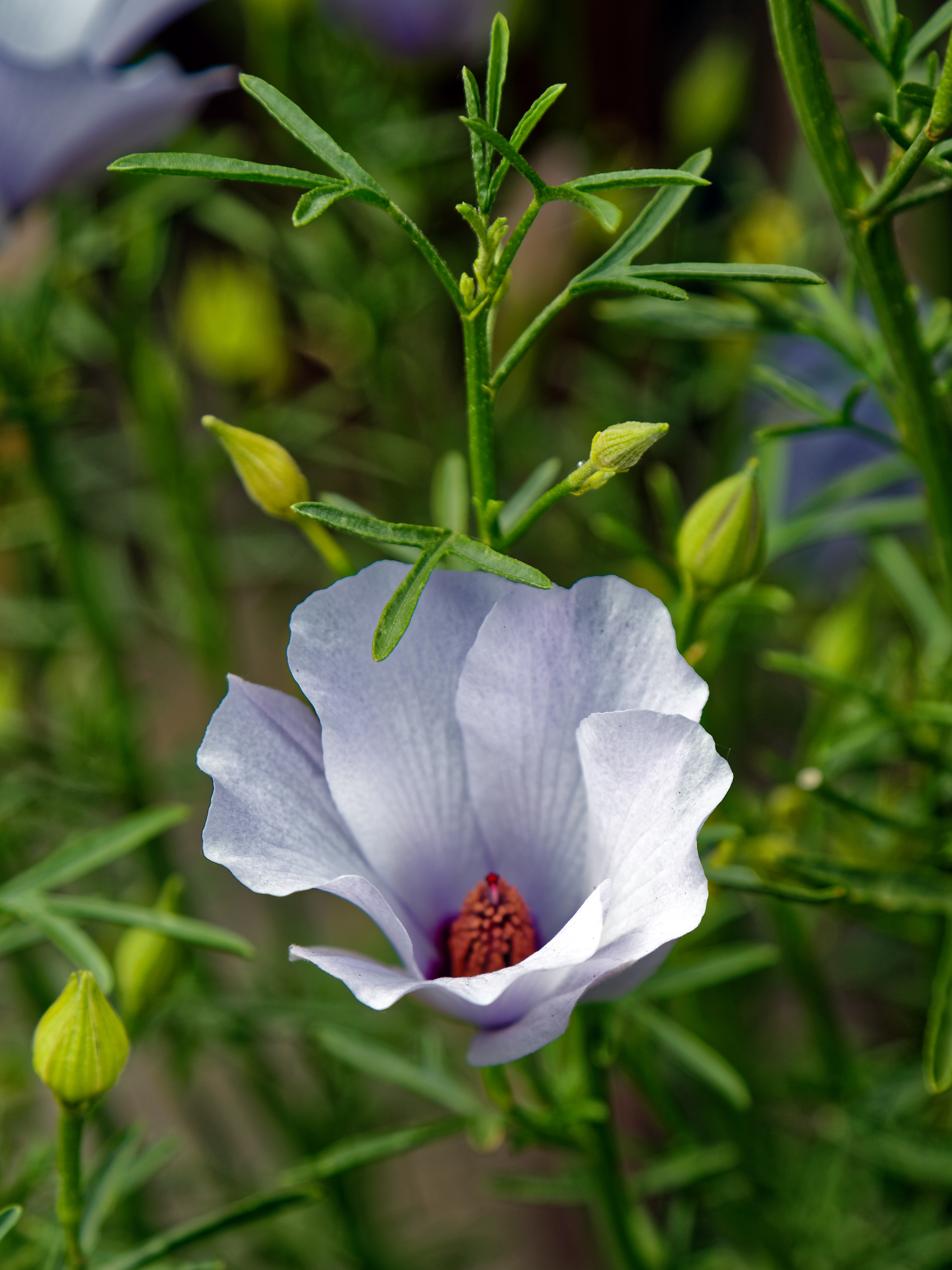
Alyogyne 'Ruth Bancroft' hybrid, grown by and named after Ruth Bancroft

In the late 19th century, Bancroft's husband's grandfather, Hubert Howe Bancroft, had started a 400-acre fruit farm, which produced walnuts and Bartlett pears. The farm operated until the late 1960s, when the land was rezoned for residential use and sold to developers. The trees, sick with a fungal disease called blackline, were cut down, and the soil was dry and bare. In 1971, Ruth Bancroft's husband, inherited three acres of empty land, which he gifted to his wife to expand her garden. His requirement was that the plants use little water, thus inspiring the xeric landscape that ultimately emerged.

Bancroft hired Lester Hawkins, a designer from Occidental in Sonoma County. He planned the central pond for the garden and added undulating mounds to break up the flat landscape. In 1976, Bancroft added a "folly," an Art Nouveau gazebo. She transplanted the best specimens of her succulent and cactus collection into the ground, using moss rock as planting beds.

In 1972, an unusually cold winter destroyed most of Bancroft's garden. She began replanting, using custom wooden frames to protect tender plants from frost. Her first Aeonium 'Glenn Davidson' plant was among the plants to survive the freeze, and still grows in the garden today.

As the garden grew, word spread among local designers and horticulturalists, who visited the garden to see which plants could survive the Walnut Creek climate. The garden became a field trip destination for plant identification for Diablo Valley College classes. When Francis Cabot, a plant collector from Quebec, Canada, visited the garden, he asked Ruth what would happen to the garden after her death. Cabot's wife suggested establishing a nonprofit organization for garden preservation, and Cabot founded The Garden Conservancy in 1989. The first garden it opened to the public was the Ruth Bancroft Garden, which began tours in 1992 and officially became a nonprofit in 1994.

== Heather Farm Park ==
Ruth and Philip Bancroft supported the effort to create Heather Farm Park in Walnut Creek. They donated five acres of their adjoining land for the park, and Ruth was a member of the Heather Farm Garden Center Association, which founded the Gardens at Heather Farm.

== Personal life ==
Bancroft had three children: Peter Bancroft, Nina Dickerson, and Kathy Hidalgo; and four grandchildren. She lived in the main home on the Bancroft property, next door to her daughter. Her husband, Philip, died in 1983.

Bancroft died on November 26, 2017, nearly three months after celebrating her 109th birthday.
