= Castle Rock Regional Recreational Area =

Regional park of the East Bay Regional Park District

Castle Rock Regional Recreation Area (Castle Rock Park)
- Interactive map of Castle Rock Regional Recreation Area (Castle Rock Park)
- Location: Contra Costa County, California
- Nearest city: Walnut Creek
- Coordinates: 37°53′6″N 121°59′29″W
- Area: 18,000 acres (73 km^{2})
- Governing body: East Bay Regional Park District

Castle Rock Regional Recreation Area is a 18,000 acres (73 km^{2}) regional park of the East Bay Regional Park District. It is located in Contra Costa County, in the East Bay region of northern California.

== Geography ==
The park lies in a scenic sandstone canyon in the Diablo Foothills of the northern Diablo Range, west of Mount Diablo and Mount Diablo State Park. The closest city is Walnut Creek to the north.

Castle Rock Regional Recreation Area is bordered by: Diablo Foothills Regional Park on the west, and Shell Ridge Open Space to the north. Together, these three parks provide 18,000 acres (73 km^{2}) of parkland for visitors to enjoy.

== Recreation and Activities ==
Castle Rock Regional Recreation Era is an attraction for many outdoor activity opportunities such as hiking, climbing, swimming, and viewing wildlife. A portion of the park is closed every year for several months in order to protect a peregrine falcon nesting site. Rock formations such as Castle Rock are popular hiking destinations for hikers of all levels and also provide climbing routes for outdoor boulderers and rope climbers.

== History ==
Around 33 to 55 million years ago, the ancestral Sierra Nevada experienced weathering due to a warming climate, which led to the deposition of sandy sediments into an inland sea in the Central Valley. This created shallow marine basins and tidal marshes. The sandy rock formations that resulted are visible along the southern and western sides of Mount Diablo at locations like Castle Rock.

== See also ==
- Diablo Range topics
- Parks in Contra Costa County, California
