= Walnut Creek, California =

City in California, United States

- City
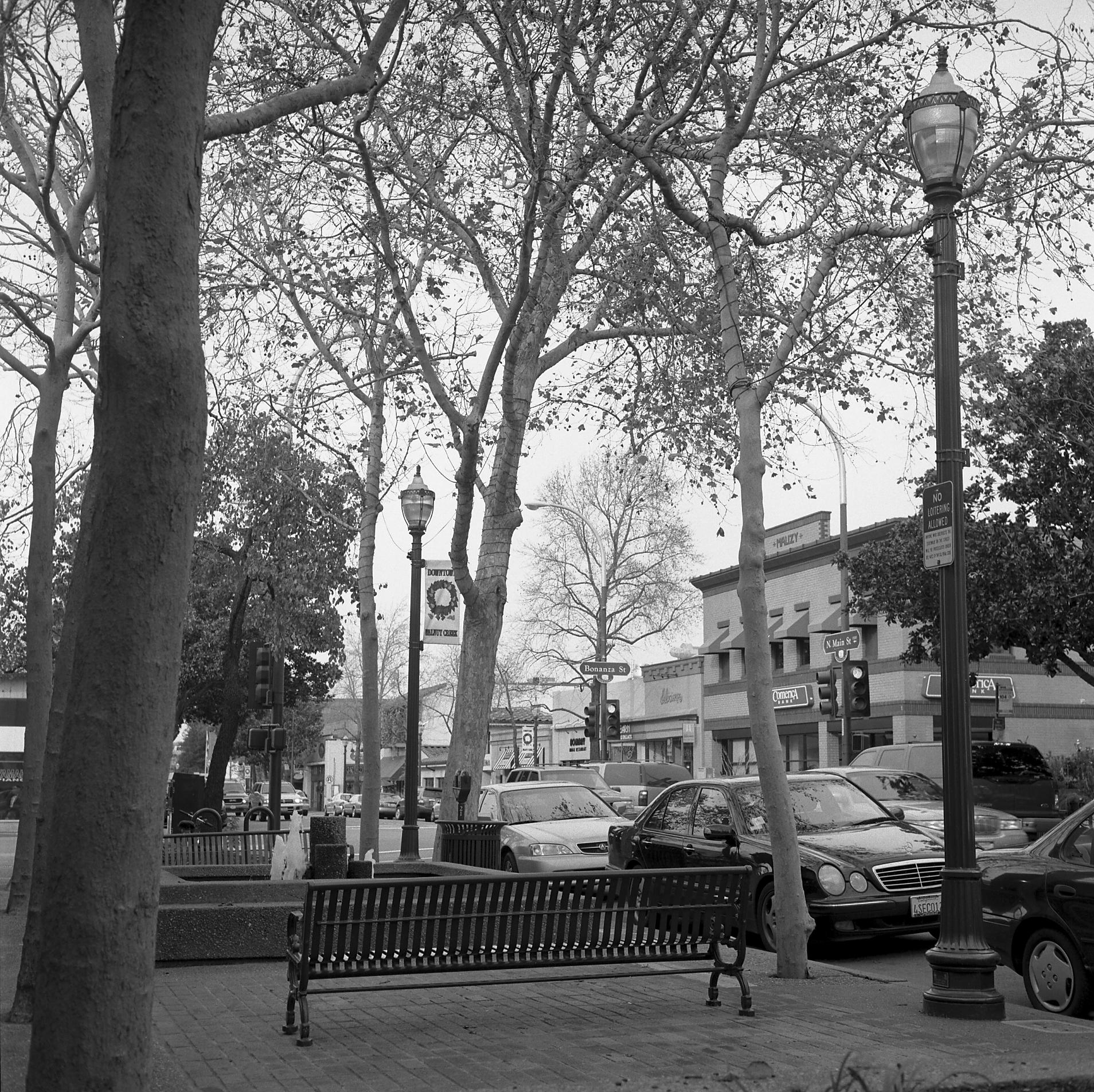
- Downtown Walnut Creek

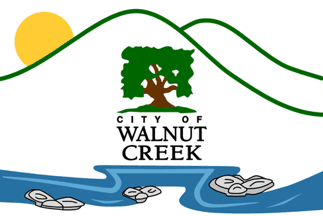
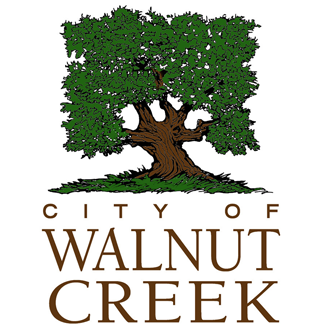
- Flag Logo
- Nicknames: "The Creek", "Dub-C", “The Nut”
- Interactive map of Walnut Creek, California
- Location in the United States Walnut Creek (California) Walnut Creek (the United States)
- Coordinates: 37°54′23″N 122°03′54″W
- Country: United States
- U.S. state: California
- County: Contra Costa
- First settled: 1849
- Municipal incorporation: October 21, 1914

Government
  - Type: General Law
  - City Council: Mayor Kevin Wilk; Mayor Pro tempore Matt Francois; Craig DeVinney; Cindy Darling; Cindy Silva
  - California State Legislature: California's 9th State Senate district Tim Grayson (D); California State Assembly Anamarie Avila Farias (D) and Rebecca Bauer-Kahan (D)
  - California's 10th congressional district: Mark DeSaulnier (D)

Area
  - Total: 19.77 sq mi (51.21 km^{2})
  - Land: 19.76 sq mi (51.18 km^{2})
  - Water: 0.012 sq mi (0.03 km^{2}) 0.06%
- Elevation: 131 ft (40 m)

Population (2020)
  - Total: 70,127
  - Density: 3,549/sq mi (1,370/km^{2})
- Time zone: UTC-8 (PST)
  - Summer (DST): UTC-7 (PDT)
- ZIP codes: 94595–94598
- Area code: 925
- FIPS code: 06-83346
- GNIS feature IDs: 1660120, 2412174
- Website: Official website

Walnut Creek is a city in Contra Costa County, California, United States, located in the East Bay region of the San Francisco Bay Area, approximately 16 miles (26 kilometers) east of the city of Oakland and 25 miles (40 kilometers) east of San Francisco. Walnut Creek has a total population of 70,127 per the 2020 census, is located at the junction of the highways from Sacramento and San Jose (I-680) and San Francisco/Oakland (SR-24), and is accessible by BART. The city shares its borders with Clayton, Lafayette, Alamo, Pleasant Hill and Concord.

== History ==
There are three bands of Bay Miwok Native Americans associated with the area of Walnut Creek (the stream for which the city is named): the Saclan, whose territory extended through the hills east of present-day cities of Oakland, Rossmoor, Lafayette, Moraga and Walnut Creek; the Volvon (also spelled Bolbon, Wolwon or Zuicun), who were near Mt. Diablo; and the Tactan, located on the San Ramon Creek in present-day Danville and Walnut Creek.

The city of Walnut Creek has developed within the earlier area of four extensive Mexican land grants. One of these land grants – measuring 18,000 acres (73 km^{2}) – belonged to Juana Sanchez de Pacheco. The grant was called Rancho Arroyo de Las Nueces y Bolbones, named after the principal waterway, Arroyo de las Nueces (Walnut Creek in English), and for the local group of Volvon indigenous Americans (also known as Bolbones in Spanish). The Arroyo de las Nueces was named for the local species of walnut tree, Juglans hindsii. The two grandsons of Sanchez de Pacheco inherited the thousands of acres of land. One, Ygnacio Sibrian, built the first roofed home in the valley in about 1850.

As settlers from the United States arrived following US annexation of California after victory in the Mexican–American War, a small settlement called "The Corners" emerged. It was named for the junction where roads met from the settlements of Pacheco and Lafayette. The intersection of Mt. Diablo Boulevard and North Main Street is now at this site. The first town settler was William Slusher, who built a dwelling on the bank of Walnut Creek, first called "Nuts Creek" by Americans in 1849. In 1855, Milo Hough of Lafayette built the hotel named "Walnut Creek House" in The Corners. A blacksmith shop and a store were soon established by settlers. In 1850 Hiram Penniman laid out the town site and realigned Main Street to what it is today. (Penniman also developed Shadelands Ranch.)

In December 1862 a United States Post Office was established here, named "Walnut Creek". Pioneer Homer Shuey platted the downtown street patterns in 1871–1872 on a portion of one of his family's large cattle ranches. These streets have been maintained to the present.

The arrival of Southern Pacific Railroad service in 1891 stimulated development of Walnut Creek. On October 21, 1914, the town and the surrounding area were incorporated as the 8th city in Contra Costa County. A branch line of the Southern Pacific ran through Walnut Creek until the late 1970s. Portions were adapted by East Bay Regional Park District for the Iron Horse Trail, which is used by walkers, runners and bikers. The mainline of the Sacramento Northern Railway passed through Walnut Creek. Both railroads had stations here. Today, the Yellow Line of the Bay Area Rapid Transit (BART) serves Walnut Creek with a station adjacent to Highway 680.

With the 1951 opening of the downtown Broadway Shopping Center (now Broadway Plaza), Contra Costa County's first major retail center, the city took off in a new direction. In the postwar period of suburban development, its population more than quadrupled – from 2,460 in 1950 to 9,903 in 1960. Growth has accelerated since the late 20th century, with a population just over 70,000 according to the latest census.

== Geography and climate ==
Walnut Creek is located at 37°54′23″N 122°03′54″W. Portions lie in both the San Ramon Valley and the Ygnacio Valley below the western slopes of Mount Diablo. According to the United States Census Bureau, the city has a total area of 19.8 sq mi (51.2 km^{2}), 0.06 percent of which is water. Walnut Creek – the actual waterway that runs through the town – has been routed underneath downtown through a series of tunnels. These start at the southwest end of Macy's and end just southwest of Bar Camino Restaurant.

=== Neighborhoods ===
Walnut Creek consists of a bustling, upscale downtown with established neighborhoods in its surrounding areas. Neighborhoods range in affordability and feel, with some being exceptionally charming and tight-knit (e.g., Parkmead) while others are more rural and forested with homes on generous lots (e.g., Tice Valley). Not all neighborhoods are incorporated; there are many unincorporated areas that are serviced by Contra Costa County. A non-exhaustive list of neighborhoods in Walnut Creek include:

- Castle Hill
- Carriage Square
- Diablo Shadows
- Lakewood Area
- Larkey Park (Median SFH sold price of $1,205,000 --- Feb 2022)
- Livorna Estates
- Northgate (Median SFH sold price of $1,762,500 --- Feb 2022)
- Overlook
- Parkmead
- Rancho Paraiso (Median SFH sold price of $2,500,000 --- Feb 2022)
- Rossmoor (A 55+ retirement community of approximately 10,000 residents)
- Rudgear Estates
- Saranap (Median SFH sold price of $1,900,000 --- Feb 2022)
- Summit Ridge
- Tice Valley (Median SFH sold price of $1,879,000 --- Feb 2022)
- Walnut Heights (Median SFH sold price of $1,802,000 --- Feb 2022)
- Walnut Knolls
- Homestead
- Creekside

Depending on the neighborhood, homes can be assigned to schools in Lafayette, San Ramon Valley, Walnut Creek, or Mt. Diablo Unified School District.

=== Open space ===
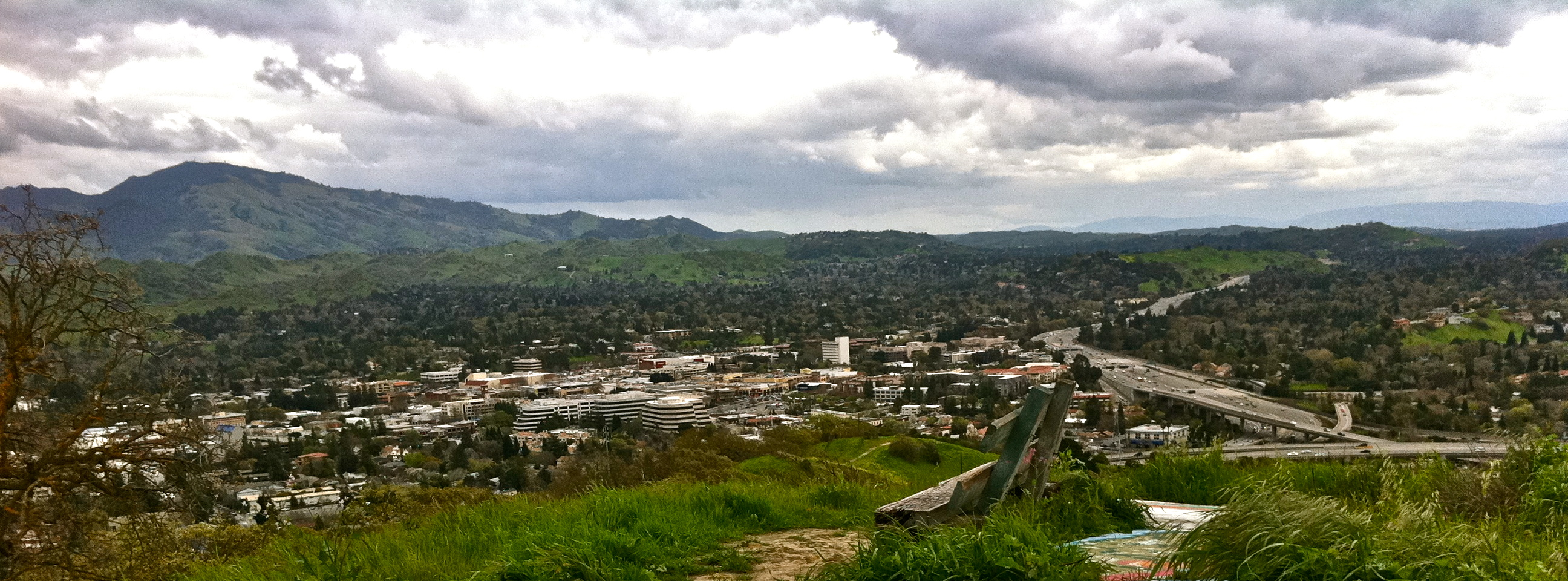
Walnut Creek as seen from Acalanes Open Space

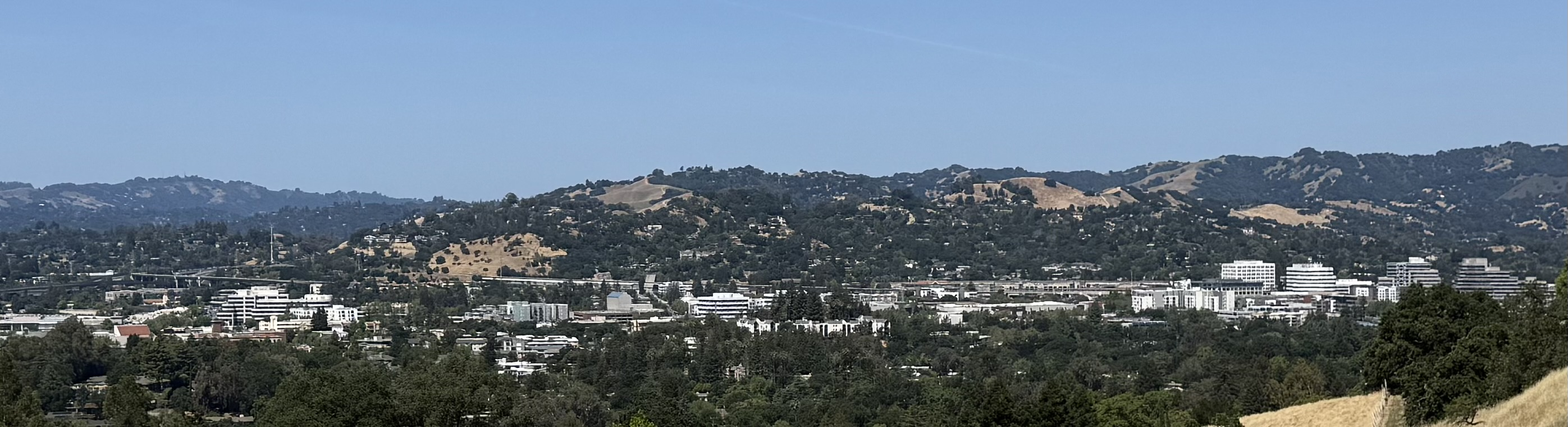
Walnut Creek as seen from Shell Ridge Open Space

Walnut Creek owns more open space per capita than any other community in the state of California. In 1974, Walnut Creek voters approved a $6.7 million bond measure to acquire and protect open space: the city purchased 1,800 acres (730 ha) of undeveloped hillsides, ridge lines, and park sites. Walnut Creek owns parts of Lime Ridge Open Space, Acalanes Ridge Open Space, Shell Ridge Open Space, and Sugarloaf Open Space.

The East Bay Regional Park District operates Diablo Foothills Regional Park and Castle Rock Regional Recreation Area, both of which are located in Walnut Creek.

=== Climate ===
Walnut Creek's warm summer Mediterranean climate (Köppen climate classification Csb) is typical of California's interior valleys. In summer, high pressure results in almost unbroken sunshine and virtually no precipitation. Days start out cool but quickly warm up, with high temperatures normally in the 80s Fahrenheit (27 to 32 °C). Temperatures of 100 °F (38 °C) or hotter occur numerous times during heatwaves, however. In the winter, the jet stream moves far enough south so that Pacific storms can reach Walnut Creek, bringing much-needed rain – average annual rainfall approximates 26 inches (660 mm), with slight variations occurring in microclimates based on elevation and topography. During particularly cold storms, snow falls on the peak of nearby Mount Diablo, but snow in the valley floor is very rare. There are numerous clear, mild days in winter, often with morning frost. The climate allows for the successful cultivation of many plants and crops, being warm enough for citrus yet cold enough for apples. The Ruth Bancroft Garden is a renowned botanical garden that showcases the diversity of plants that can be successfully grown.

Climate data for Walnut Creek, California
| Month | Jan | Feb | Mar | Apr | May | Jun | Jul | Aug | Sep | Oct | Nov | Dec | Year |
|---|---|---|---|---|---|---|---|---|---|---|---|---|---|
| Record high °F (°C) | 80 (27) | 83 (28) | 97 (36) | 94 (34) | 103 (39) | 109 (43) | 115 (46) | 112 (44) | 114 (46) | 101 (38) | 89 (32) | 76 (24) | 115 (46) |
| Mean daily maximum °F (°C) | 55.0 (12.8) | 61.3 (16.3) | 65.2 (18.4) | 71.1 (21.7) | 75.7 (24.3) | 82.5 (28.1) | 88.2 (31.2) | 87.2 (30.7) | 84.4 (29.1) | 76.7 (24.8) | 65.7 (18.7) | 56.2 (13.4) | 72.4 (22.5) |
| Daily mean °F (°C) | 45.4 (7.4) | 49.8 (9.9) | 52.5 (11.4) | 56.9 (13.8) | 61.3 (16.3) | 67.0 (19.4) | 71.3 (21.8) | 70.7 (21.5) | 68.0 (20.0) | 61.5 (16.4) | 53.2 (11.8) | 46.6 (8.1) | 58.7 (14.8) |
| Mean daily minimum °F (°C) | 35.8 (2.1) | 38.2 (3.4) | 39.8 (4.3) | 42.8 (6.0) | 46.9 (8.3) | 51.5 (10.8) | 54.4 (12.4) | 54.2 (12.3) | 51.6 (10.9) | 46.3 (7.9) | 40.7 (4.8) | 36.9 (2.7) | 44.9 (7.2) |
| Record low °F (°C) | 17 (−8) | 21 (−6) | 24 (−4) | 28 (−2) | 32 (0) | 34 (1) | 38 (3) | 41 (5) | 36 (2) | 27 (−3) | 23 (−5) | 18 (−8) | 17 (−8) |
| Average precipitation inches (mm) | 4.52 (115) | 3.62 (92) | 2.47 (63) | 1.38 (35) | 0.56 (14) | 0.14 (3.6) | 0.01 (0.25) | 0.04 (1.0) | 0.24 (6.1) | 1.05 (27) | 2.26 (57) | 3.83 (97) | 20.12 (510.95) |
| Average snowfall inches (cm) | 0.1 (0.25) | 0.0 (0.0) | 0.0 (0.0) | 0.0 (0.0) | 0.0 (0.0) | 0.0 (0.0) | 0.0 (0.0) | 0.0 (0.0) | 0.0 (0.0) | 0.0 (0.0) | 0.0 (0.0) | 0.0 (0.0) | 0.1 (0.25) |
| Average precipitation days (≥ 0.01 in) | 10 | 9 | 8 | 5 | 3 | 1 | 0 | 0 | 1 | 3 | 6 | 9 | 55 |
Source: Western Regional Climate Center

== Public transit and bike trails ==
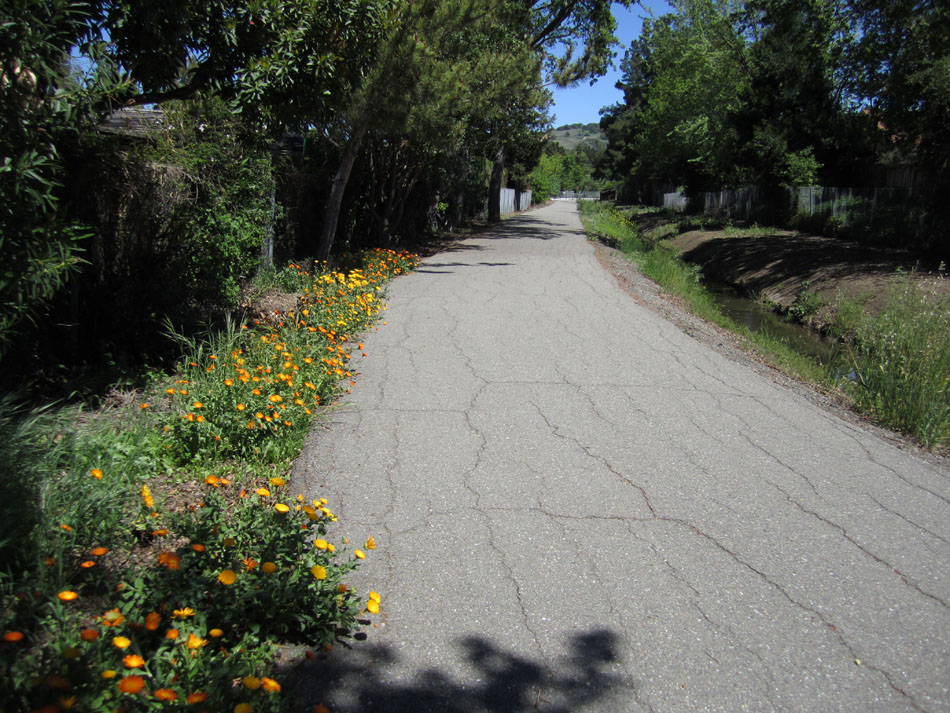
Ygnacio Valley Canal Trail to Lime Ridge Open Space

The city has two Bay Area Rapid Transit (BART) stations – Walnut Creek and Pleasant Hill (in the unincorporated area known as Contra Costa Centre Transit Village) – both served by the Yellow Line.

Central Contra Costa Transit Authority (County Connection/CCCTA) provides bus service throughout Walnut Creek and Contra Costa County at a modest cost. County Connection also operates three free weekday shuttles within city limits: the Downtown Trolley/Route 4 loops from Walnut Creek BART to Broadway Plaza; Route 5 runs from Walnut Creek BART to Creekside; and Route 7, which runs from Pleasant Hill BART to Shadelands Business Park.

Walnut Creek is transected by the Iron Horse Trail (running north–south) through its downtown, as well as the Contra Costa Canal Trail (running east–west) at the north end of the city. Both these trails, in addition to city bike lanes, make bicycle transportation feasible both for recreation and as an alternative commute.

== Demographics ==
Historical population
| Census | Pop. | Note | %± |
|---|---|---|---|
| 1880 | 94 | | — |
| 1920 | 538 | | — |
| 1930 | 1,014 | | 88.5% |
| 1940 | 1,578 | | 55.6% |
| 1950 | 2,420 | | 53.4% |
| 1960 | 9,903 | | 309.2% |
| 1970 | 39,844 | | 302.3% |
| 1980 | 54,033 | | 35.6% |
| 1990 | 60,569 | | 12.1% |
| 2000 | 64,296 | | 6.2% |
| 2010 | 64,173 | | −0.2% |
| 2020 | 70,127 | | 9.3% |
U.S. Decennial Census

=== 2020 census ===
As of the 2020 census, Walnut Creek had a population of 70,127 and a population density of 3,548.9 inhabitants per square mile (1,370.2/km^{2}). The census reported that 98.7% of the population lived in households, 0.4% lived in non-institutionalized group quarters, and 0.9% were institutionalized. 100.0% of residents lived in urban areas, while 0.0% lived in rural areas.

There were 32,246 households, of which 21.8% had children under the age of 18 living in them. Of all households, 46.4% were married-couple households, 5.2% were cohabiting couple households, 15.7% were households with a male householder and no spouse or partner present, and 32.8% were households with a female householder and no spouse or partner present. About 36.6% of all households were made up of individuals and 22.2% had someone living alone who was 65 years of age or older. The average household size was 2.15. There were 18,187 families (56.4% of all households).

The age distribution was 17.0% under the age of 18, 5.1% aged 18 to 24, 25.1% aged 25 to 44, 23.8% aged 45 to 64, and 29.1% who were 65 years of age or older. The median age was 47.5 years. For every 100 females, there were 86.0 males, and for every 100 females age 18 and over there were 82.1 males age 18 and over.

There were 34,251 housing units at an average density of 1,733.4 units per square mile (669.3 units/km^{2}), of which 32,246 (94.1%) were occupied. Of occupied housing units, 64.3% were owner-occupied and 35.7% were occupied by renters. Of all housing units, 5.9% were vacant. The homeowner vacancy rate was 1.0% and the rental vacancy rate was 7.0%.

Racial composition as of the 2020 census
| Race | Number | Percent |
|---|---|---|
| White | 46,478 | 66.3% |
| Black or African American | 1,564 | 2.2% |
| American Indian and Alaska Native | 214 | 0.3% |
| Asian | 11,684 | 16.7% |
| Native Hawaiian and Other Pacific Islander | 111 | 0.2% |
| Some other race | 2,463 | 3.5% |
| Two or more races | 7,613 | 10.9% |
| Hispanic or Latino (of any race) | 7,304 | 10.4% |

=== Ethnic communities ===
Walnut Creek includes Middle Eastern communities, including Iranians and Jordanians.

=== Income and poverty ===
In 2023, the US Census Bureau estimated that the median household income was $135,665, and the per capita income was $83,164. About 4.2% of families and 5.9% of the population were below the poverty line.

== Government ==
City Council members are elected at-large to staggered, four-year terms, in elections held in even-numbered years.

As of December 2025, the current elected representatives are Kevin Wilk (Mayor), Matt Francois (Mayor Pro Tem), Cindy Silva, Cindy Darling and Craig DeVinney (Council members).

=== County, state, and federal representation ===
On the Contra Costa County Board of Supervisors, Walnut Creek is split between Supervisorial District 2 and Supervisorial District 4, represented by Candace Andersen and Ken Carlson, respectively.

In the California State Legislature, Walnut Creek is split between the 15th Assembly district, represented by Democrat Anamarie Avila Farias and the 16th Assembly district, represented by Democrat Rebecca Bauer-Kahan and in the 9th senatorial district, represented by Democrat Tim Grayson.

In the United States House of Representatives, Walnut Creek is located in California's 10th congressional district, represented by Mark DeSaulnier (D–Concord).

According to the California Secretary of State, as of February 10, 2019, Walnut Creek has 46,149 registered voters. Of those, 21,391 (46.4%) are registered Democrats, 10,708 (23.2%) are registered Republicans, and 12,147 (26.3%) have declined to state a political party.

Walnut Creek vote by party in presidential elections
| Year | Democratic | Republican |
|---|---|---|
| 2024 | 73.6% 29,681 | 23.4% 9,455 |
| 2020 | 74.0% 32,385 | 24.2% 10,602 |
| 2016 | 69.8% 25,812 | 24.6% 9,106 |
| 2012 | 63.0% 22,918 | 34.9% 12,718 |
| 2008 | 65.3% 24,625 | 32.9% 12,388 |
| 2004 | 60.3% 21,898 | 38.6% 14,034 |
| 2000 | 54.1% 19,210 | 41.9% 14,901 |
| 1996 | 50.3% 17,398 | 41.8% 14,464 |
| 1992 | 44.7% 16,695 | 36.5% 13,622 |
| 1988 | 39.8% 13,600 | 59.3% 20,257 |
| 1984 | 31.2% 10,158 | 67.9% 22,140 |
| 1980 | 24.2% 6,677 | 62.8% 17,337 |
| 1976 | 30.6% 7,491 | 68.1% 16,676 |
| 1972 | 27.3% 5,830 | 70.9% 15,148 |
| 1968 | 31.5% 4,910 | 64.8% 10,084 |
| 1964 | 55.7% 3,789 | 44.3% 3,018 |

== Education ==
=== Public K–12 ===
Walnut Creek residents attend schools in five public school districts. The Walnut Creek School District (K–8) has five elementary schools, one magnet school (K–8), and one middle school in the city. Some residents are served by schools from the Mount Diablo Unified School District (K–12), the Acalanes Union High School District (9–12), the San Ramon Valley Unified School District (K–12), and the Lafayette School District (K–8). The Walnut Creek and Lafayette districts feed into Acalanes Union HSD.

The following public schools are within the city limits of Walnut Creek:

Walnut Creek School District

- Buena Vista Elementary
- Indian Valley Elementary
- Murwood Elementary
- Parkmead Elementary
- Walnut Heights Elementary
- Walnut Creek Intermediate
- Tice Creek School

Acalanes Union High School District

- Las Lomas High School
- Acalanes Center for Independent Study

Mount Diablo Unified School District

- Eagle Peak Montessori (charter elementary, grades 1-8)
- Bancroft Elementary
- Valle Verde Elementary
- Walnut Acres Elementary
- Foothill Middle
- Northgate High School

=== Private K–12 ===
Walnut Creek is home to several private schools, including:

- Berean Christian High School (Grades: 9–12)
- Contra Costa Christian Schools (Grades: PK–12)
- Fusion Academy Walnut Creek (Grades: 6–12)
- Garden Gate Montessori School (Grades: PK–K)
- North Creek Academy & Preschool (Grades: PK–8)
- Palmer School (Grades: K–8)
- St. Mary of the Immaculate Conception School (Grades: PK–8)
- The Seven Hills School (Grades: PK–8)
- Springfield Montessori School (Grades: PK–K)
- Walnut Creek Christian Academy (Grades: K–8)
- Wellspring Educational Services

=== Public libraries ===
The Walnut Creek Library and the Ygnacio Valley Library of the Contra Costa County Library are located in Walnut Creek. The Ygnacio Valley Branch, which opened in 1975, is also known as the Thurman G. Casey Memorial Library. Fundraising and other support is provided by the Walnut Creek Library Foundation.

On February 26, 2008, the city demolished the Walnut Creek Library, that was built in 1961 at the southern end of Civic Park. Mayor Gwen Regalia hosted a groundbreaking on the same site for the new library on May 19, 2008. The new library, designed by Group 4 Architecture, Research + Planning, Inc., has 42,000 square feet (3,900 m^{2}) and an underground parking garage. Construction was completed in 2010 and the library was officially opened on July 17, 2010.

== Economy ==
Companies based in Walnut Creek include Central Garden & Pet (makers of the AvoDerm, Amdro, Kaytee brands, among others), American Reprographics Company, CSE Insurance Group, Maximum Games, and the PMI Group.

== Points of interest ==
Borges Ranch in Shell Ridge Open Space.

- Bedford Art Gallery
- Boundary Oak Golf Course
- Broadway Plaza Shopping Center
- Castle Rock Park
- Civic Park
- Heather Farm Park, including Gardens at Heather Farm
- Howe Homestead Park
- Lesher Center for the Arts
- Lindsay Wildlife Museum
- Mount Diablo State Park
- Open space hiking/biking trails, including Acalanes, Lime Ridge, Shell Ridge
- Old Borges Ranch
- Ruth Bancroft Garden
- St. Paul's Episcopal Church, featuring Carpenter Gothic chapel
- Shadelands Ranch Museum
- Walden Park Disc Golf Course
- Walnut Creek Model Railroad Society

== Media ==
Walnut Creek is served by the daily newspaper, The East Bay Times (formerly The Contra Costa Times). The paper was originally run and owned by the Lesher family. Since the death of Dean Lesher in 1993, the paper has had several owners. The Times, as it is known, has a section called "The Walnut Creek Journal."

Walnut Creek TV (WCTV) is the city's government-access television channel, covering local government and community events. WCTV is available in Walnut Creek on Comcast channel 28 (channel 26 in Rossmoor), Astound channel 29, AT&T U-verse channel 99 under the menu option "Walnut Creek Television", and on YouTube.

== Notable events ==
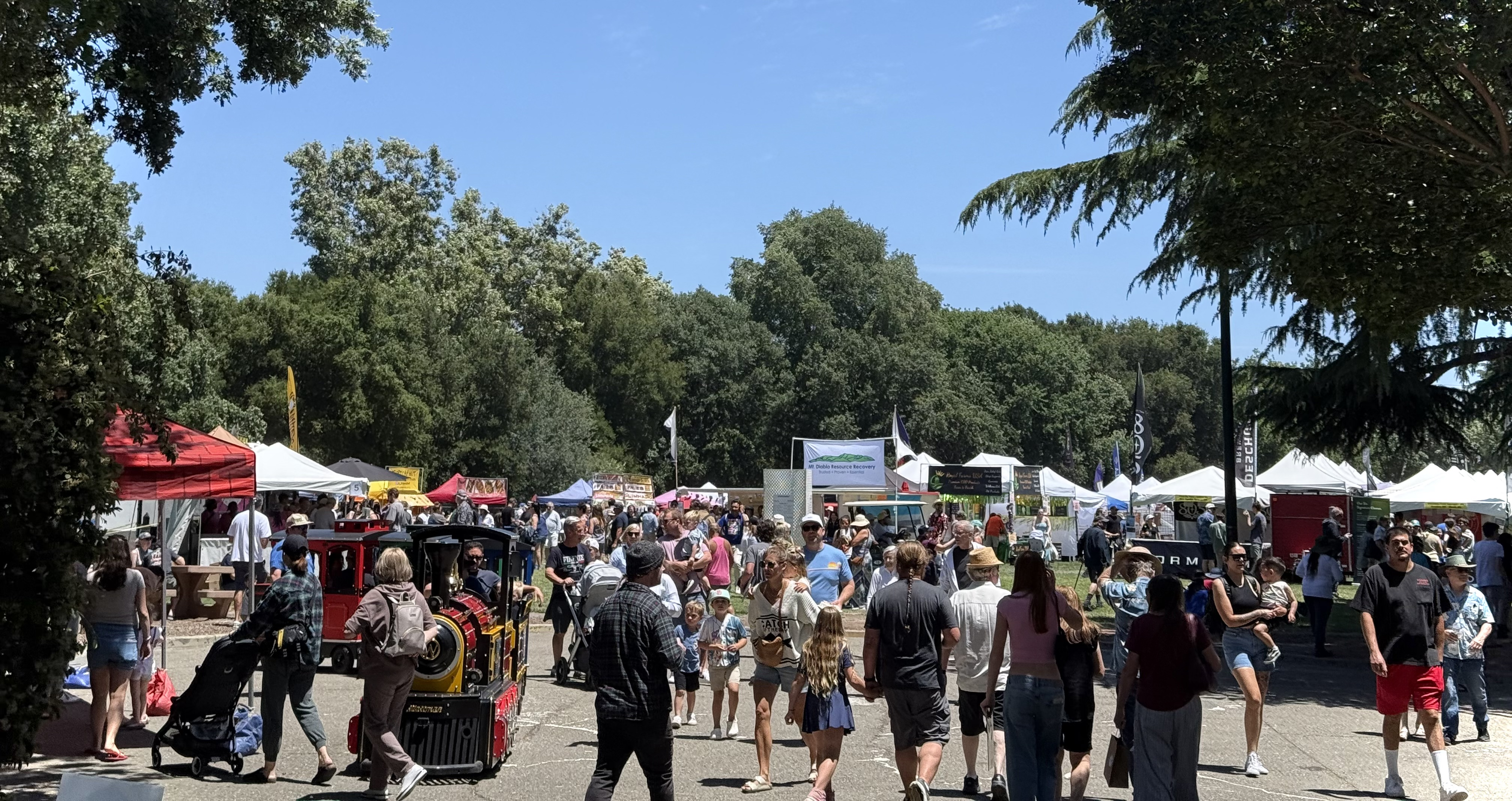
Walnut Creek Art and Wine Festival at Civic Park during 2025 (Note: The festival was held in Civic Park during 2025 because Heather Farm Park was undergoing construction)

The Walnut Creek Art & Wine Festival is an annual festival that usually takes place at Heather Farm Park on the first weekend of June. The festival includes visual and physical art vendors, wine tastings, food stalls and live music. It has been held annually for over 40 years, recognized by the Contra Costa Times as "the East Bay's Best Outdoor Festival" and winner of Walnut Creek Magazine's Best Community Event five times. The festival is held by The Walnut Creek Chamber of Commerce & Visitor Bureau.

== Notable people ==
- Jessica D. Aber (1981–2025), U. S. Attorney for Eastern Virginia
- Arthur Adams, comics artist
- Matt Anger, professional tennis player
- Dan Ashley, journalist
- Ruth Bancroft, gardener, landscape architect and creator of the Ruth Bancroft Garden
- Jessica Bowman, actress, portrayed Colleen Cooper in Dr. Quinn, Medicine Woman
- Tom Candiotti, MLB pitcher
- Richard Carlson, psychotherapist, author of Don't Sweat the Small Stuff
- Curt Casali (born 1988), baseball catcher who last played for the San Francisco Giants
- Joyce Chin, comics artist
- Dr. Alette Coble-Temple, Ms. Wheelchair America 2016, disability advocate
- TJ Cox, congressman
- Corey Duffel, professional skateboarder
- Amit Elor (born 2004), 2024 Olympic champion and 8x world champion freestyle wrestler
- Kyle Gass, guitarist for Tenacious D, attended Las Lomas High School
- Lee Goldberg, writer and television producer, graduated from Northgate High School (1980)
- Mary Griffith, LGBTQ+ activist
- Ella Halikas, model, body positivity activist, and social media influencer
- Miles Hall, a 23 year-old African American unarmed man who was fatally shot by Walnut Creek Police Department officers
- Dan Haren, MLB pitcher
- Brandon Harkins, professional golfer
- Jack Henderson, artist
- Marya Hornbacher, author
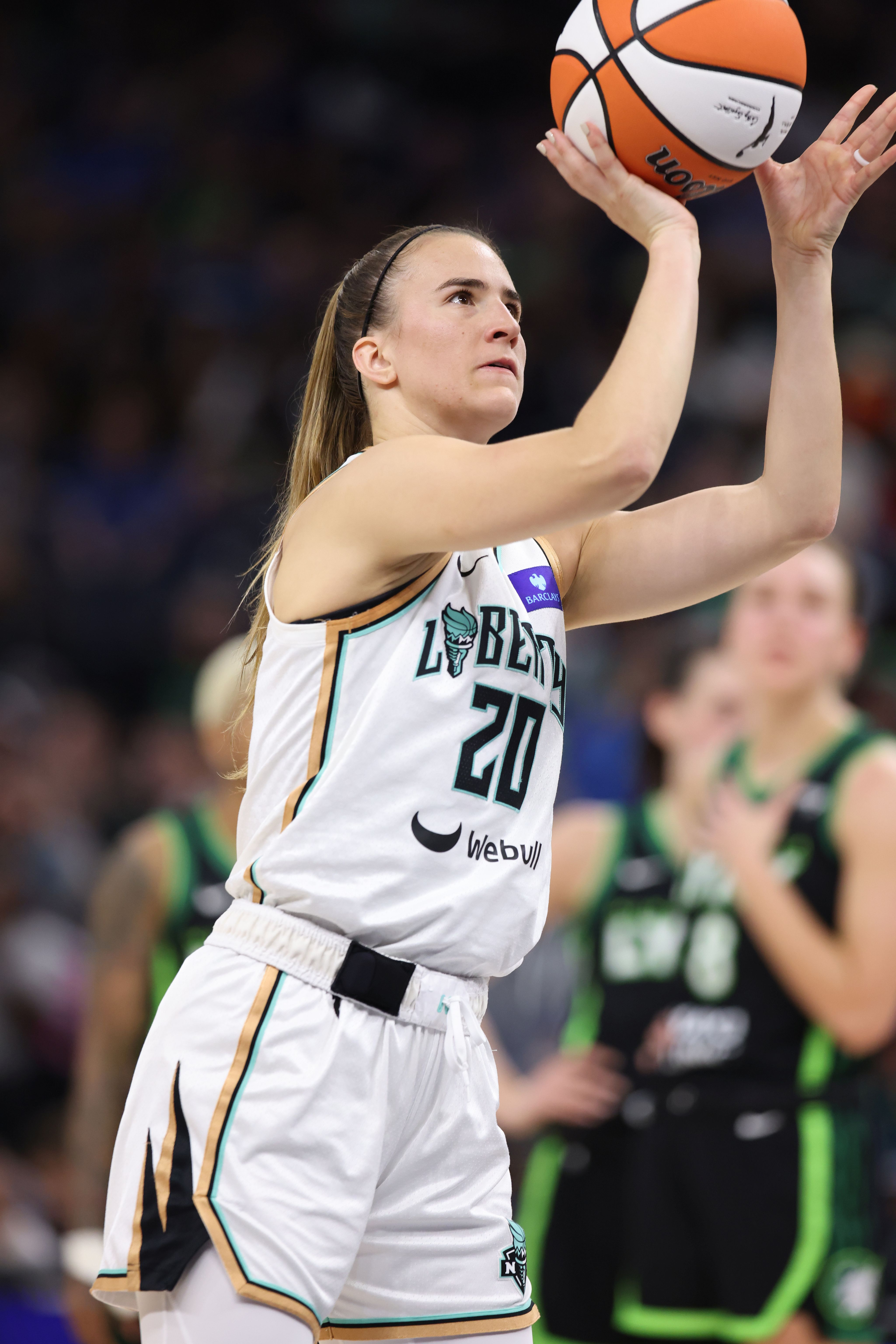
- Sabrina Ionescu
  Sabrina Ionescu, basketball player
- Kristian Ipsen, diver, Olympic bronze medalist
- Kyle Jensen, baseball player
- Bessilyn Johnson, daughter of Hiram Penniman, Shadelands Ranch owner, resident of Scotty's Castle in Death Valley
- Randy Johnson, Hall of Fame MLB pitcher
- Persis Karim (born 1962), poet, editor, educator; born in Walnut Creek
- Matteo Jorgenson (born 1999), professional cyclist
- Kira Kazantsev, Miss America 2015
- Alexandra Killewald, professor of sociology at the Harvard Kennedy School
- Richard L. Lieber, muscle physiologist
- Hans Lineweaver (1907–2009), physical chemist known for popularizing the double-reciprocal plot, died in Walnut Creek at the age of 101
- Neville C. Luhmann Jr. (1943–2025), physicist
- Tosh Lupoi (born 1981), defensive line coach for Jacksonville Jaguars
- Mark "Mad Dog" Madsen (born 1976), NBA player
- Charles McAdoo (born 2002), MLB infielder for the Toronto Blue Jays
- John A. Nejedly (1914–2006), California State Senator
- Kyle Newacheck, co-creator, co-star of Comedy Central's Workaholics
- Jason Newsted (born 1963), bassist for Metallica
- Aaron Poreda (born 1986), MLB pitcher
- Markie Post (1950–2021), television actress
- A.J. Puckett (born 1995), professional baseball pitcher in the Chicago Cubs organization
- Jeff Richards, writer and featured performer on NBC's Saturday Night Live, 2001–2004
- Bill Rigney (1918–2001), MLB infielder, Angels' inaugural manager
- Lester Rodney, journalist, civil rights activist
- Katharine Ross (born 1940), film actress, graduated from Las Lomas High School (1957)
- Leslie Carrara-Rudolph, Sesame Street puppeteer
- Greg Sestero, actor, star of cult film The Room, author of The Disaster Artist, born in Walnut Creek
- Justin Speier (born 1973), MLB pitcher
- Joe Starkey (born 1973), California Golden Bears and former San Francisco 49ers announcer
- Chad Stevens (born 1999), MLB infielder, born in Walnut Creek
- Jacques Terzian (1921–2016) sculptor
- The Story So Far, pop punk band
- Christy Turlington, supermodel, health activist
- Lars Ulrich (born 1963), drummer for Metallica
- James William Valentine (1926–2023), evolutionary biologist, died in Walnut Creek
- Katie Volynets (born 2001), professional tennis player
- Joseph R. Walker, 19th-century wilderness explorer and scout
- Johnny Weekly (1937–1974), MLB outfielder
- Wayne A. Wiegand, library historian, author, academic
- Sherri Youngward, Christian singer and songwriter

== Sister cities ==
Walnut Creek has an active Sister Cities International program with two sister cities. Schools in the city have a yearly student exchange with these cities.

- Noceto, Italy
- Siófok, Hungary

== See also ==
- Walnut Creek CDROM
- List of cities and towns in California
- List of cities and towns in the San Francisco Bay Area
