= Covéa =

French mutual insurance company

Covéa Group
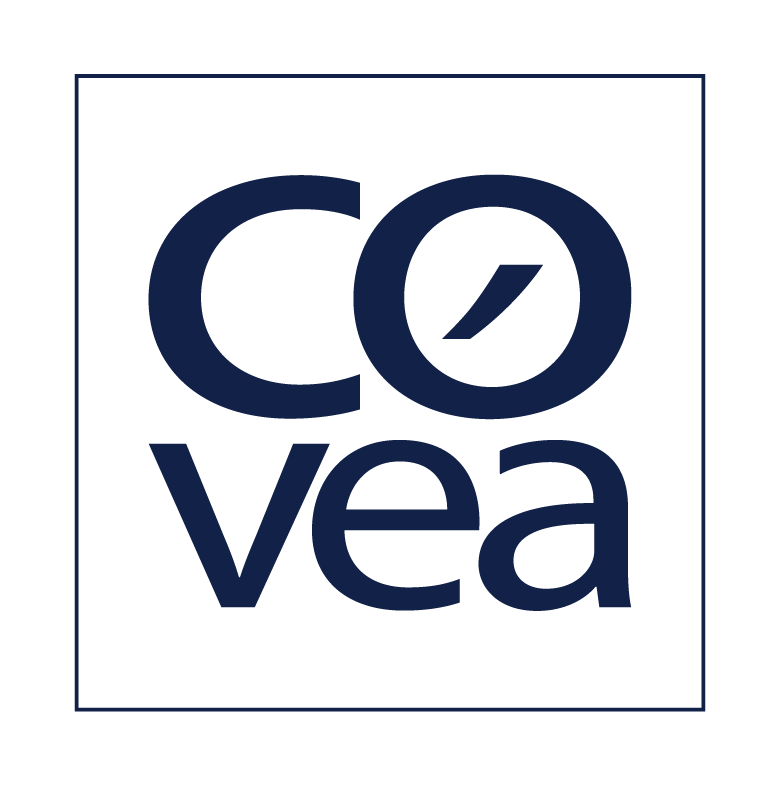
- Type: Société de groupe d’assurance mutuelle (SGAM)
- Industry: Insurance
- Founded: 1999; 27 years ago
- Headquarters: Paris, France,
- Key people: Michel Gougnard (chairman of Covéa SGAM); Thierry Derez (CEO)
- Products: Property insurance, Liability insurance, Financial services
- Net income: 838 million euros
- Number of employees: 23,000 (21,000 in France) in 2021
- Website: covea.eu

Covéa is a French mutual insurance company that covers property, liability and reinsurance businesses headquartered in Paris. It was formed from the merger of three separate French mutual insurance companies Garantie Mutuelle des Fonctionnaires (GMF), Mutuelle d'assurance des artisans de France (MAAF) and Mutuelle du Mans Assurance (MMA).

It became a mutual insurance group company or SGAM, a special French legal status, in 2002 and operates a number of different brands in France and other countries, that have been obtained through acquisitions.

In 2014, Covéa was number one for property and liability insurance in France and served over 11 million policyholders, generating €16.5 billion in premiums. The Covéa group attained a Standard & Poor's A positive rating and was rated No. 1 for Solvency ratio amongst the top 20 European Insurance groups.

== History ==
In 1999, through the initiative of the insurance companies Mutuelle des artisans de France (MAAF) and Mutuelles du Mans Assurances (MMA), the mutual reinsurance company Covéa was formed.

In 2003, under the leadership of group of mutual insurance companies (GEMA) a new legal form of "mutual insurance group company" (SGAM) was established by the French government. Covéa was approved as a SGAM in 2003.

In 2005, the general meeting of Covéa approve the merger with Azur and of the Garantie mutuelle des fonctionnaires (GMF).

On 12 July 2022, Covéa announces completing the acquisition of PartnerRe Ltd. from Exor for a total cash consideration of €7,9Bn.

=== UK ===
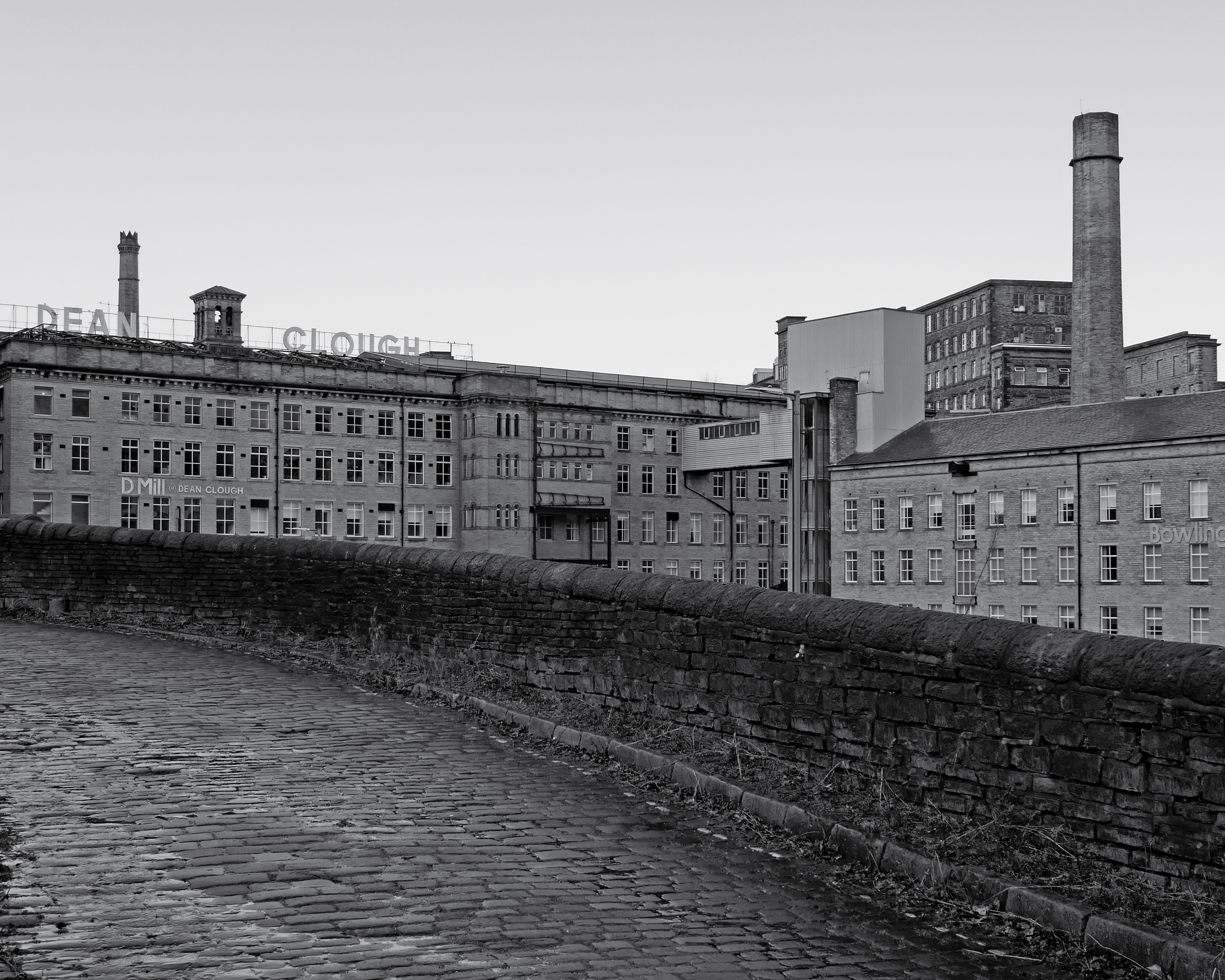
Covea have offices at Dean Clough Mill in Halifax, West Yorkshire.

Covéa Insurance plc was formed in October 2012 following the parent's acquisition and merger of three longstanding UK insurance businesses - Provident Insurance, MMA Insurance and Gateway Insurance. It had approximately 1.2 million policyholders in the UK and employed over 1,000 people across their network of UK offices.

On 25 February 2015, Covéa Group acquired another UK insurance business, Sterling Insurance. Sterling's general insurance business was transferred into Covéa Insurance from 1 January 2016.

As of June 2019, Covea Insurance plc has nearly 2000 employees in the UK, and has 7 offices in England with the registered office being in Reading and the largest being in Halifax.

In June 2023, Covea Insurance plc appointed Georges de Macedo as its new CEO. He replaced, with immediate effect, Adrian Furness, who decided to step back after nearly 30 years in the role.

== Subsidiaries ==
=== Other affiliated mutuals ===
- Assurances Mutuelles de France (AM), specialist in reinsurance
- APGIS, specializing in group protection guarantees
- SMI, health insurance specialist

=== Specialist subsidiaries ===
==== Insurance ====
- APJ, defending the rights of individuals
- Covéa Deposit, financial security developers and builders, regulated professions to ensure the protection of the funds entrusted by clients.
- Covéa Fleet, specializing in corporate fleets and transportation
- Covéa Risks, insurance brokerage
- DAS, legal protection (PJ) of businesses and individuals
- Lybernet, Internet insurance (including marketing the brand Aloa, is also white label for other operators)
- Nexx, insurance by telephone and internet
- NOVEA, risk specialist aggravated auto insurance

==== Reinsurance ====
- Covéa Lux internal reinsurance
- Covéa Re: Mutual Reinsurance

==== Management ====
- Covéa AIS (Assistance, compensation, services), economic interest group specializing in the management of claims FMG signs, MAAF, MMA, and partners.
- Covéa Finance, Asset Management
- Covéa Estate (GIE), promotion of heritage, such as technical management, property management and asset management
- Covéa Tech, new technologies (engineering and technical studies)

==== Services ====
- Assurland, web based comparison site
- France broker, mortgage brokerage company
- Empruntis, brokerage credits Internet
- Fidelia Assistance, support worldwide
- Santéclair, health risk management.

==== Endowment Fund ====
- The Diderot Institute, Covéa is behind the creation of this endowment fund providing public debate analysis on the social economy.
- Thôt, created jointly by Covéa and Jean-Claude Seys, designed to promote cooperation between companies and academic research

==== Miscellaneous ====
- ACT International (extended warranty for new vehicles and used vehicles) in collaboration with manufacturers.

=== Subsidiaries and international holdings ===
11.6% of turnover in 2013 came from contributions of activities located abroad.

The development on the international scene allows Covéa to overcome the limitations of external growth in France (the market share already held by Covéa representing nearly 20% of the auto market and HRM ) .

It is also a geographical diversification of risk solution in response to the solvency requirements in the insurance sector by the rules called "Solvency II".

==== Canada ====
- la Capitale Assurances Générales (Québec) (20% de participation GMF). Capital AG also owns the following companies: The only (risk business broker distribution), Penncorp (Life, health and disability), and York & Fi ( IARD )

==== United States ====
- CSE Insurance Group ( Civil Service Employees Insurance Group, based in California) for employees of the Public Service

==== Spain ====
- Caser (based in Madrid) (subsidiary of Spanish Savings Banks for about 80%, MAAF MMA & 20%)

==== Luxembourg ====
- AME Life Lux (a subsidiary 50% AM-GMF and 50% Ethias)
- AME Lux (a subsidiary 50% AM-GMF and 50% Ethias) sells property and casualty products

==== United Kingdom ====
- Covéa Insurance plc (amalgamated the 1 st October 2012 MMA Insurance, Gateway, and Provident acquired in 2011), markets a range of products for individuals and professionals
- Swinton brokerage business - Sold off to Ardonagh Group Setp 2018
- Sterling Insurance offers a wide range of niche insurance products and also sells administrative services and technical solutions to several major British financial companies.
