= Ruth Bancroft Garden =

Public dry garden in Walnut Creek, California

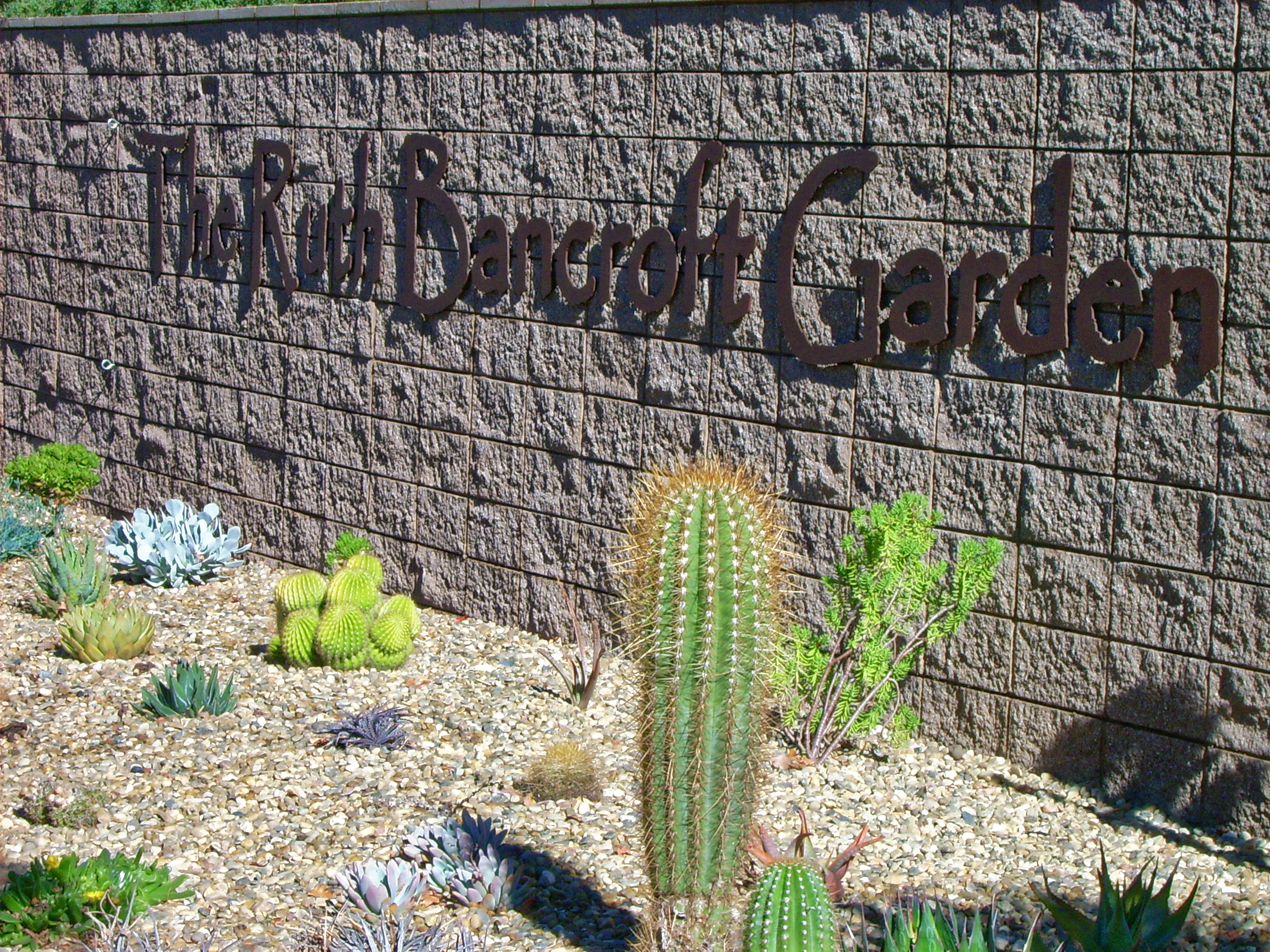

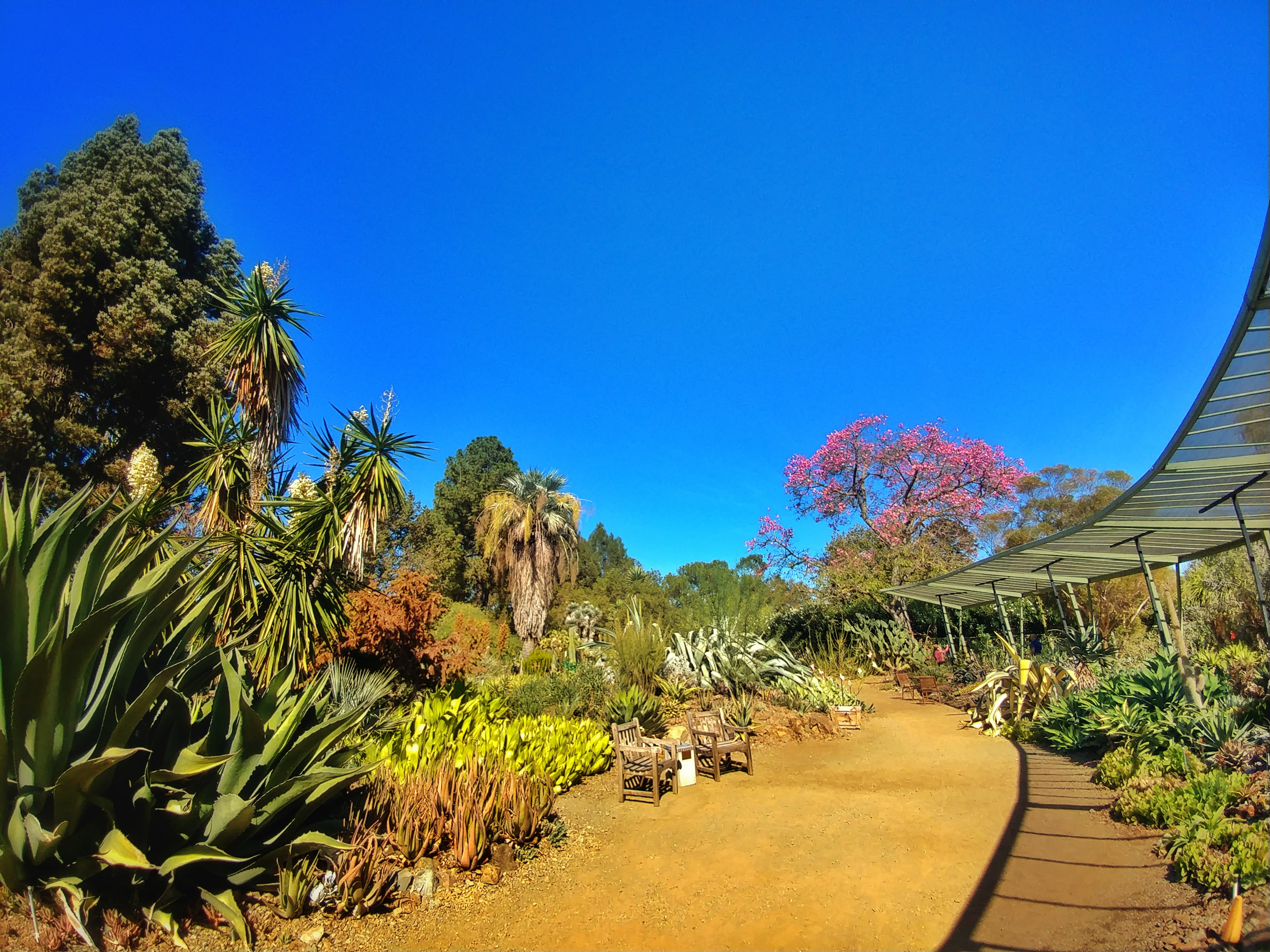
- A collection of succulents

- Location within San Francisco Bay Area Location within California Location within the United States
- Type: Botanical garden
- Location: 1552 Bancroft Road, Walnut Creek, California
- Coordinates: 37°55′25.61″N 122°2′14.16″W
- Area: 2.5 acres (1.0 ha)
- Opened: 1950
- Website: https://www.ruthbancroftgarden.org/

The Ruth Bancroft Garden is a 3.5-acre (1.4 ha) public dry garden established by Ruth Bancroft. It contains more than 2,000 cactus, succulents, trees, and shrubs native to California, Mexico, Chile, South Africa, and Australia. It is located at 1552 Bancroft Road in Walnut Creek, California, USA.

== History ==
The Garden began in the early 1950s as Ruth Bancroft's private collection of potted plants within Bancroft Farm, a 400-acre (160 ha) property bought by publisher Hubert Howe Bancroft (grandfather of Ruth's husband Philip) in the 1880s as an orchard for pears and walnuts. In the 1950s, Bancroft brought home a single succulent, an Aeonium grown by plant breeder Glenn Davidson. By 1972, the collection was moved to its current site, when the orchard was cut down and the land was rezoned.

In 1989, it became the first garden in the United States to be preserved by The Garden Conservancy, and has been open to the public since 1992. Today the Garden is an outstanding landscape of xerophytes (dry-growing plants). It is open to the public for an admission fee of $8–10.

== Collection ==
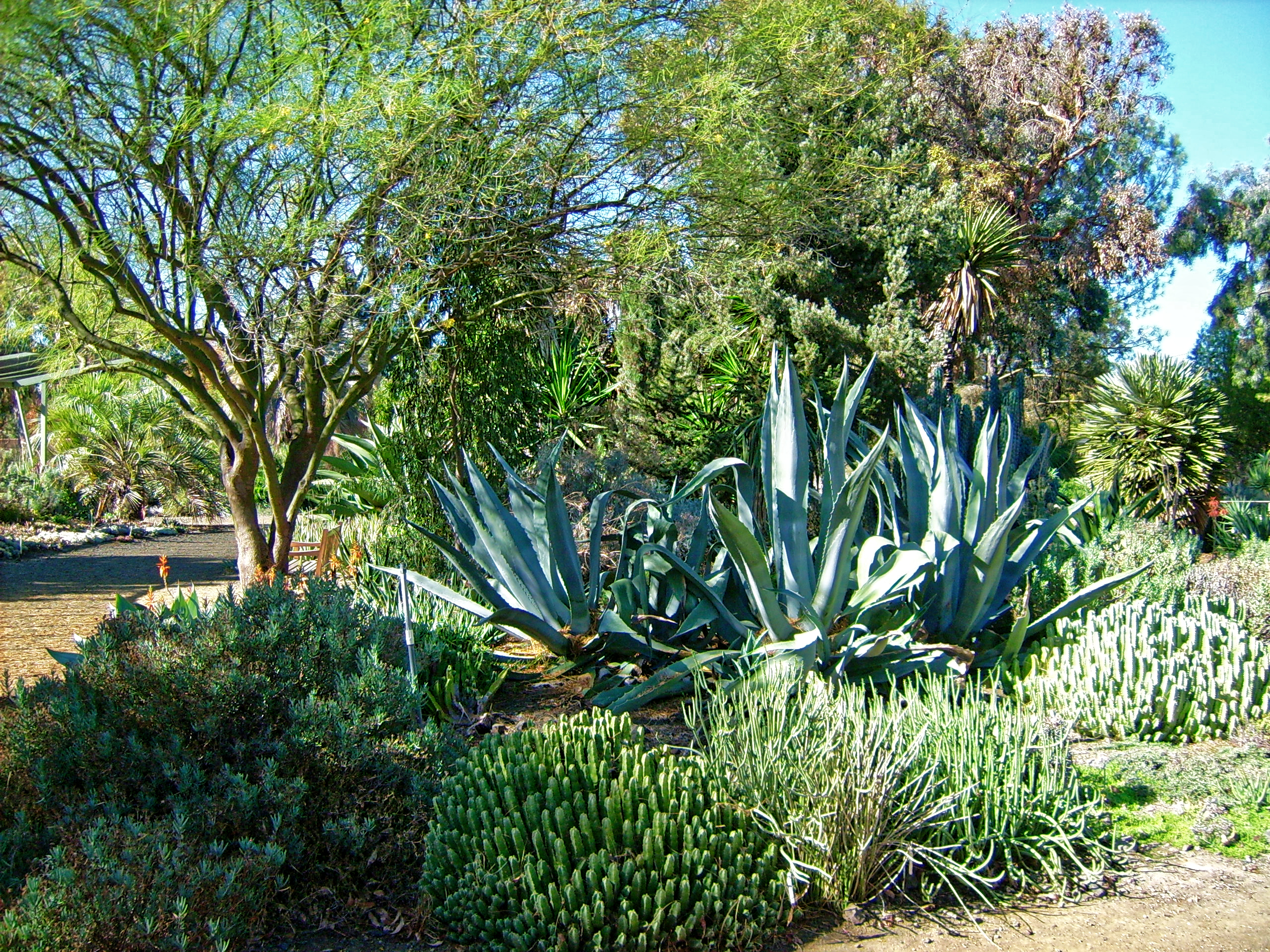
Trees, succulents, and other plants at the Garden.

Garden collections include the following plants:

- Aeoniums
- Aloes
- Agavoideae
- Brachychiton trees including Brachychiton rupestris
- Brahea palms including Brahea armata
- Bromeliaceae-Bromeliads including Dyckias, Hechtias, and Puyas (including Puya chilensis)
- Butia palms
- Dasylirions including Dasylirion longissimum and Dasylirion wheeleri
- Dudleyas
- Echeverias
- Echinocacti
- Furcraeas including Furcraea cabuya
- Hesperaloes including Hesperaloe parviflora
- Hesperoyuccas including Hesperoyucca whipplei
- Jubaea chilenensis palms
- Nolinas; Xanthorrhoeas including Xanthorrhoea preissii
- Yuccas including Yucca filamentosa, Yucca gloriosa, and Yucca rostrata

== Gallery ==
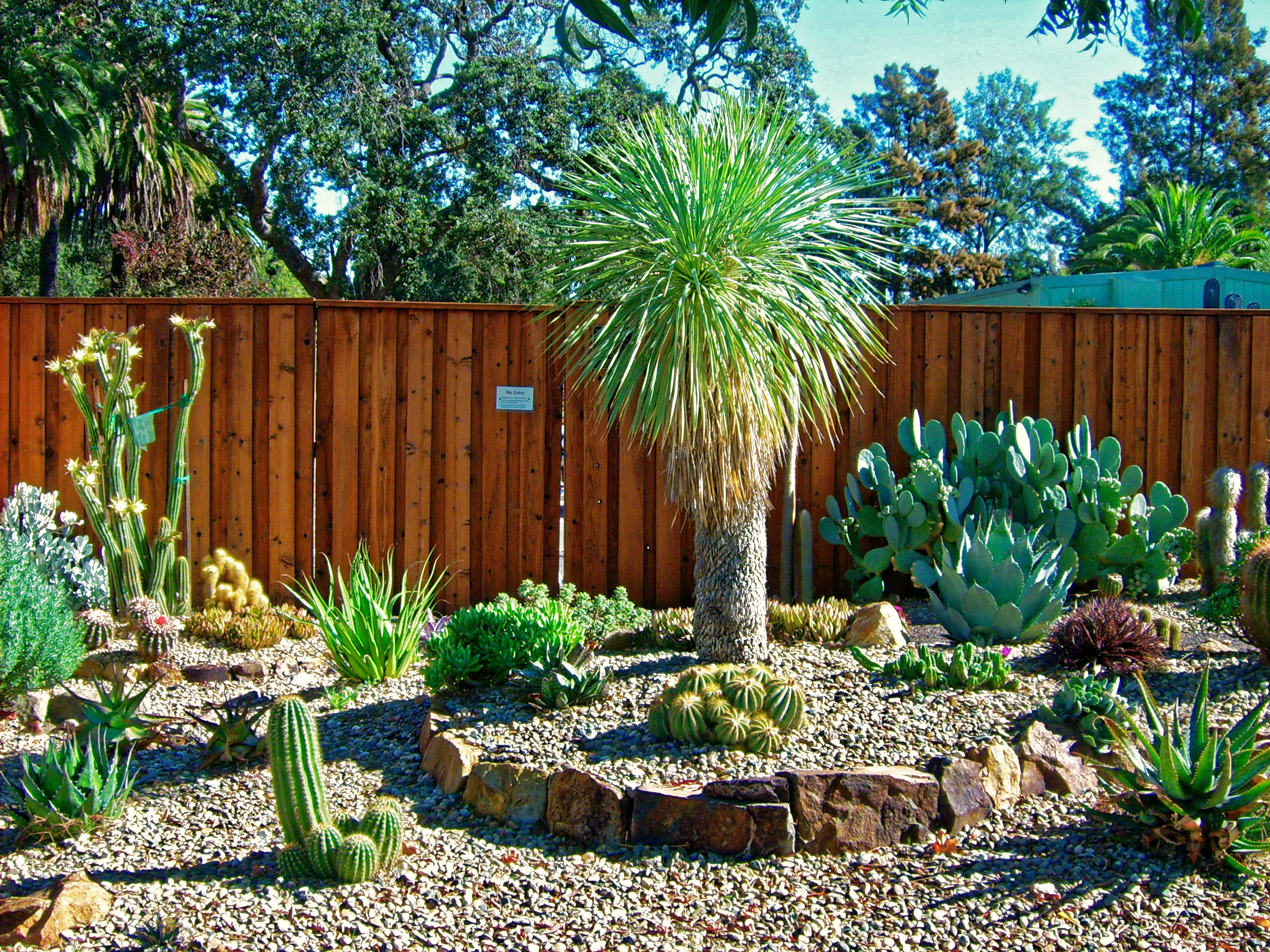

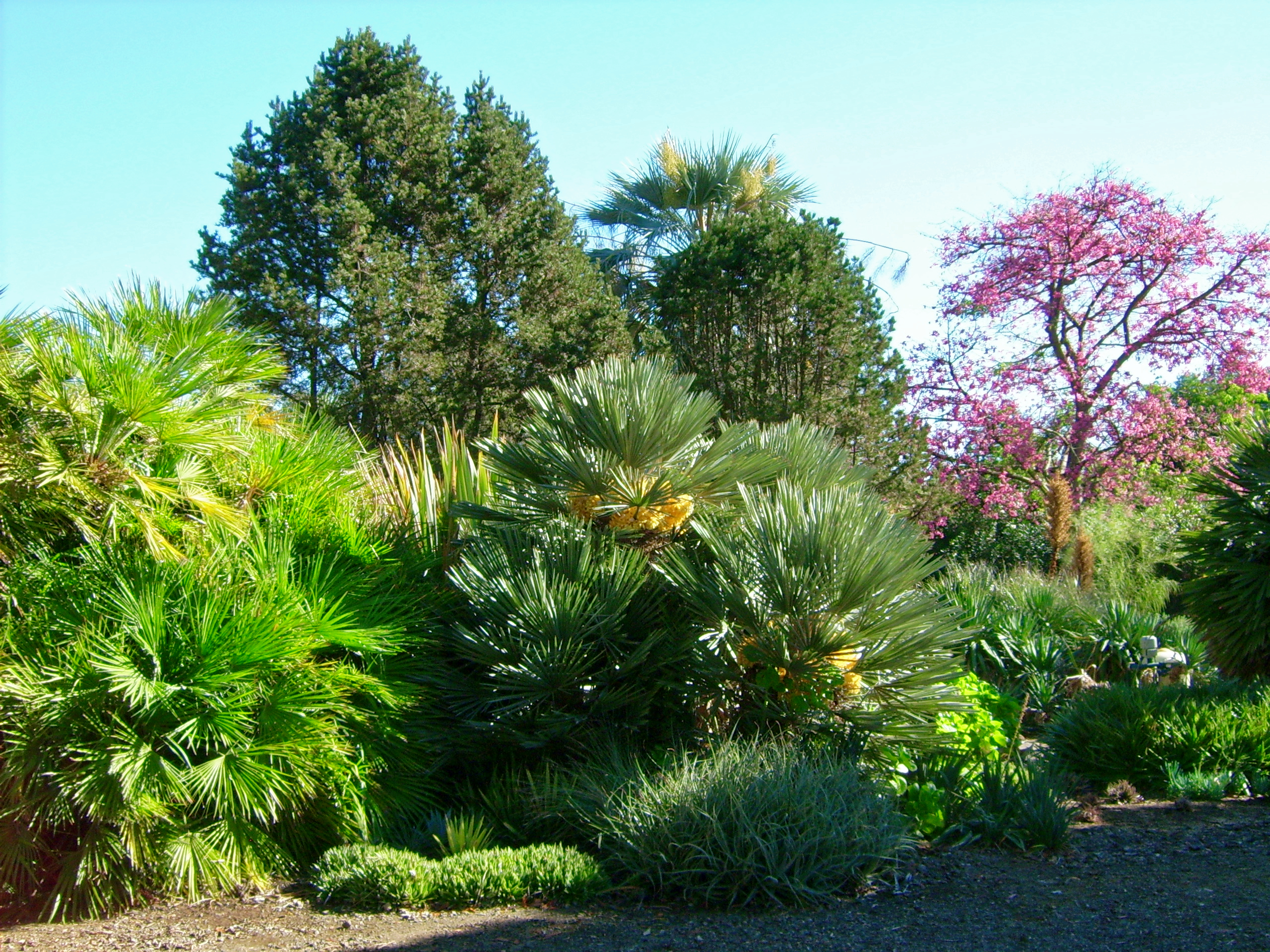

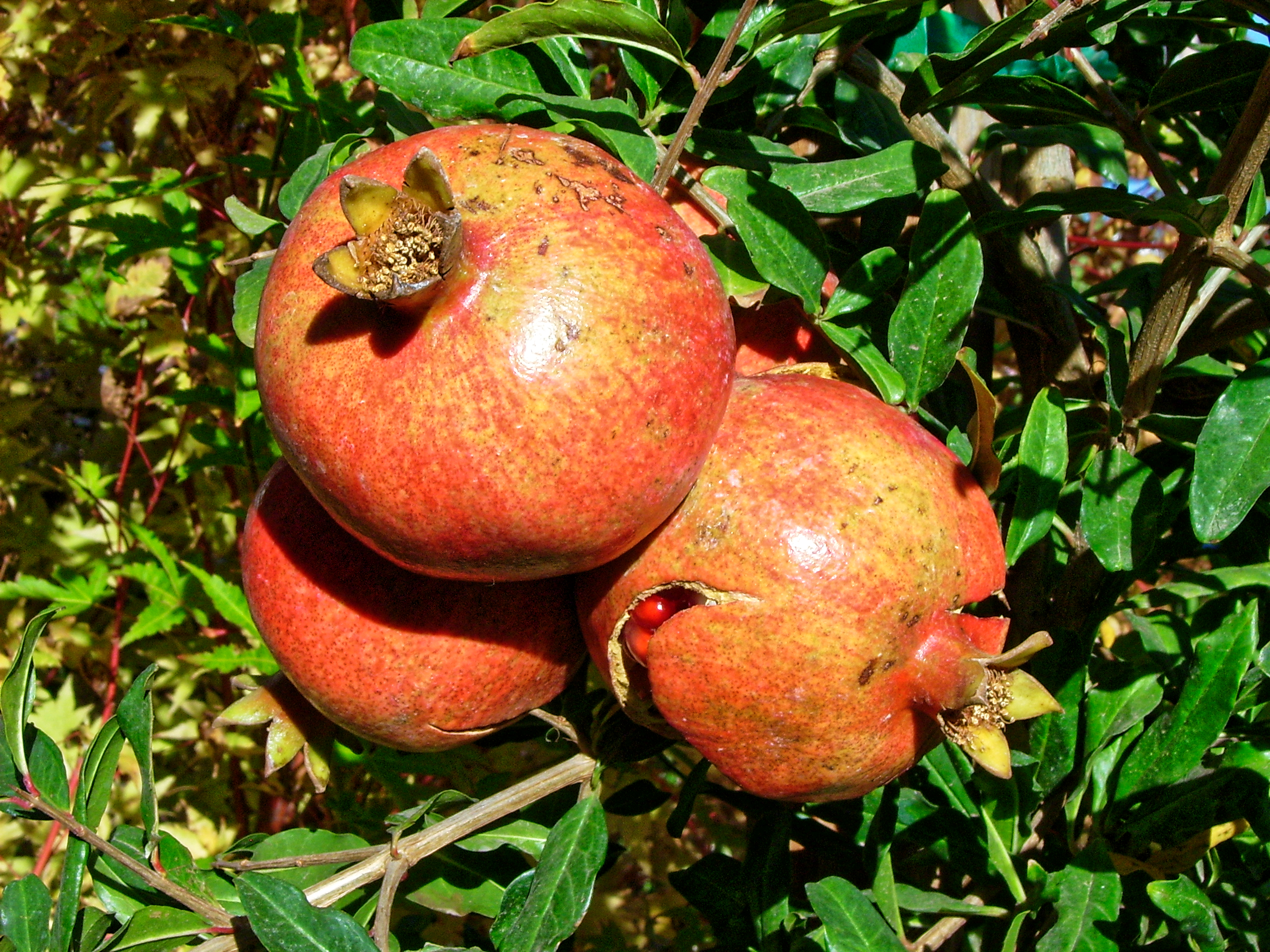

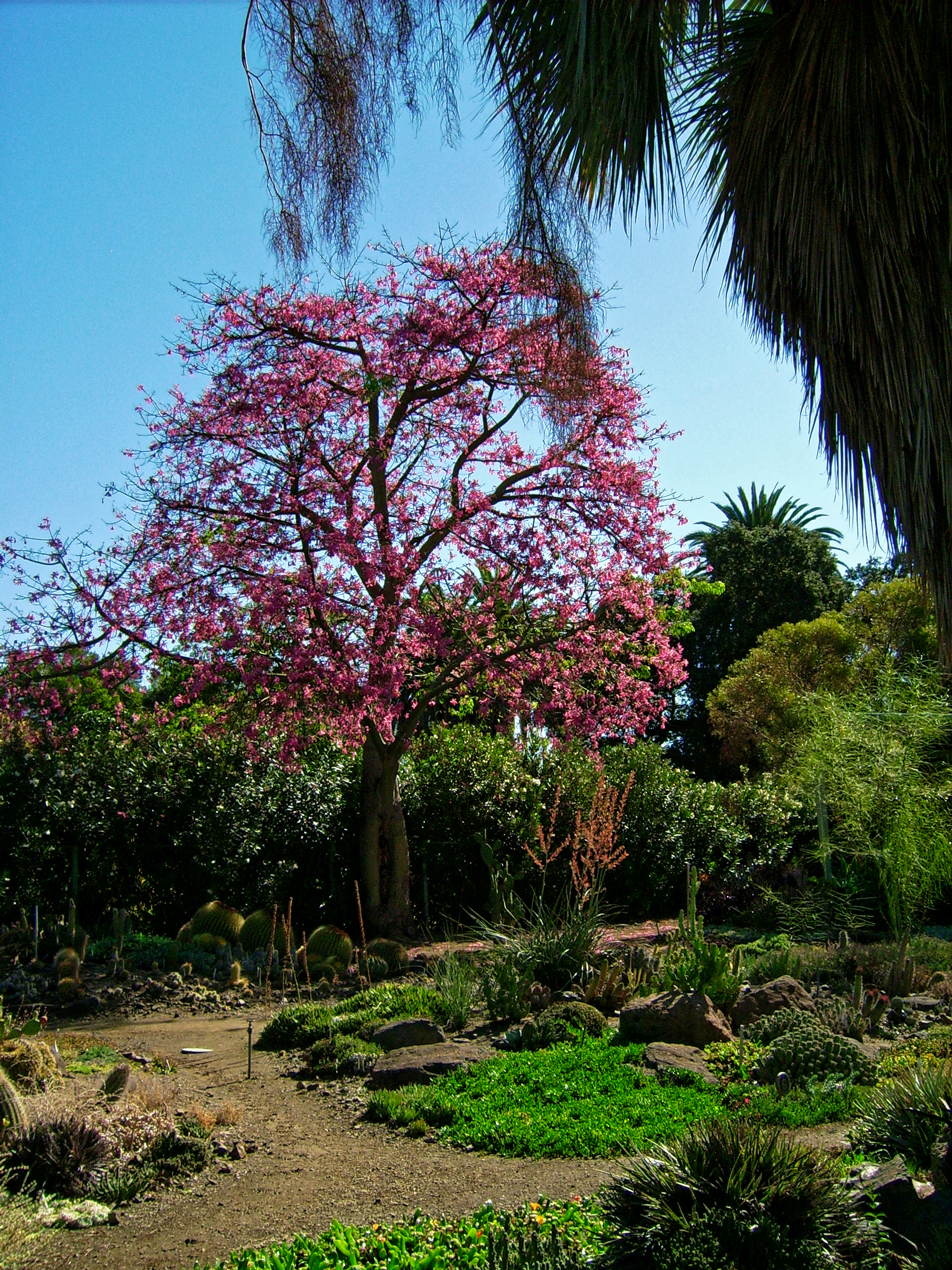

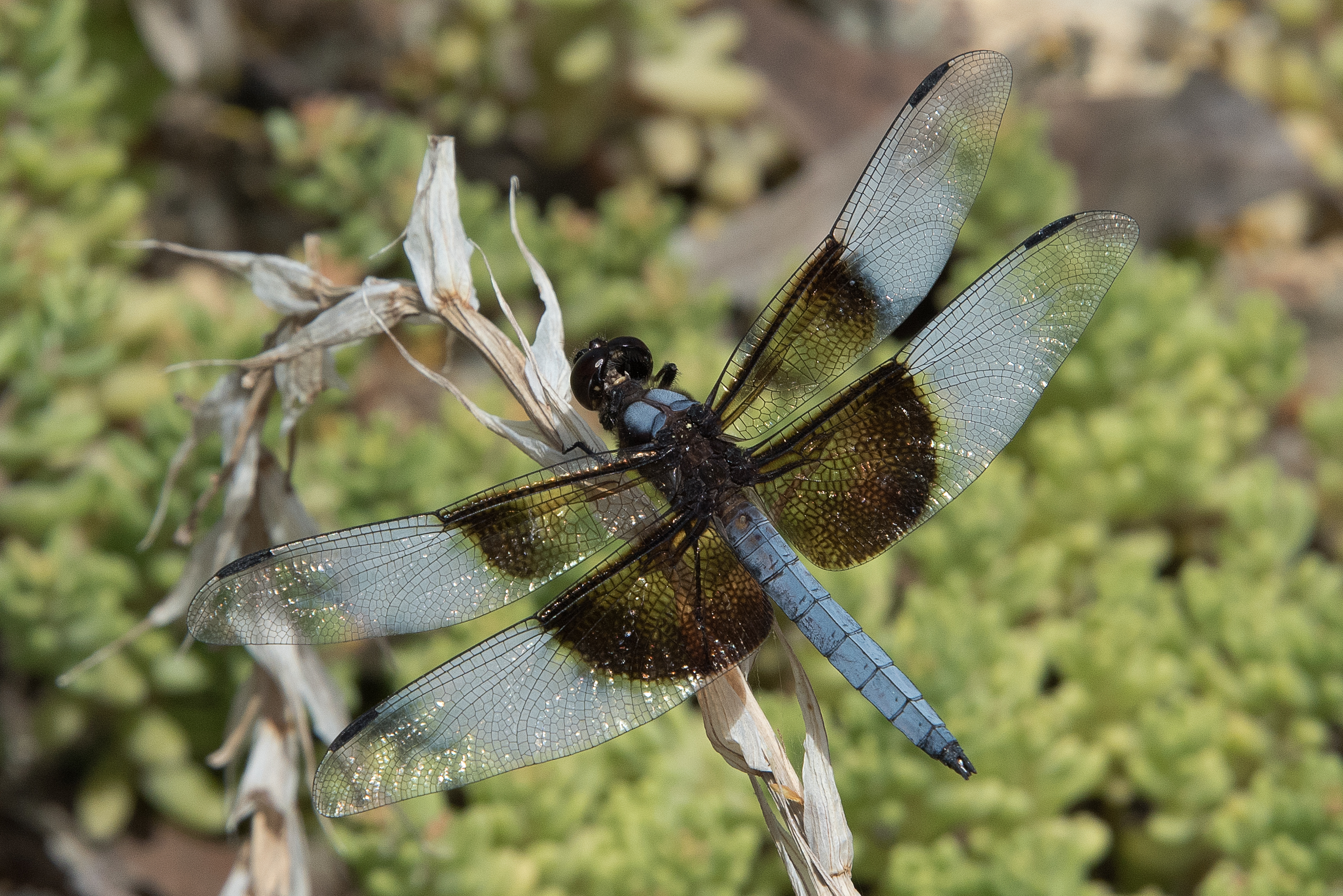

== See also ==
- List of botanical gardens and arboretums in California
- List of botanical gardens in the United States
