= Diablo Foothills Regional Park =

Coordinates: 37.88247°N 121.9965°W

- IUCN category V (protected landscape/seascape)
- Interactive map of Diablo Foothills Regional Park
- Location: Contra Costa County, California
- Nearest city: Walnut Creek
- Area: 1,060 acres (4.3 km^{2})
- Governing body: East Bay Regional Park District

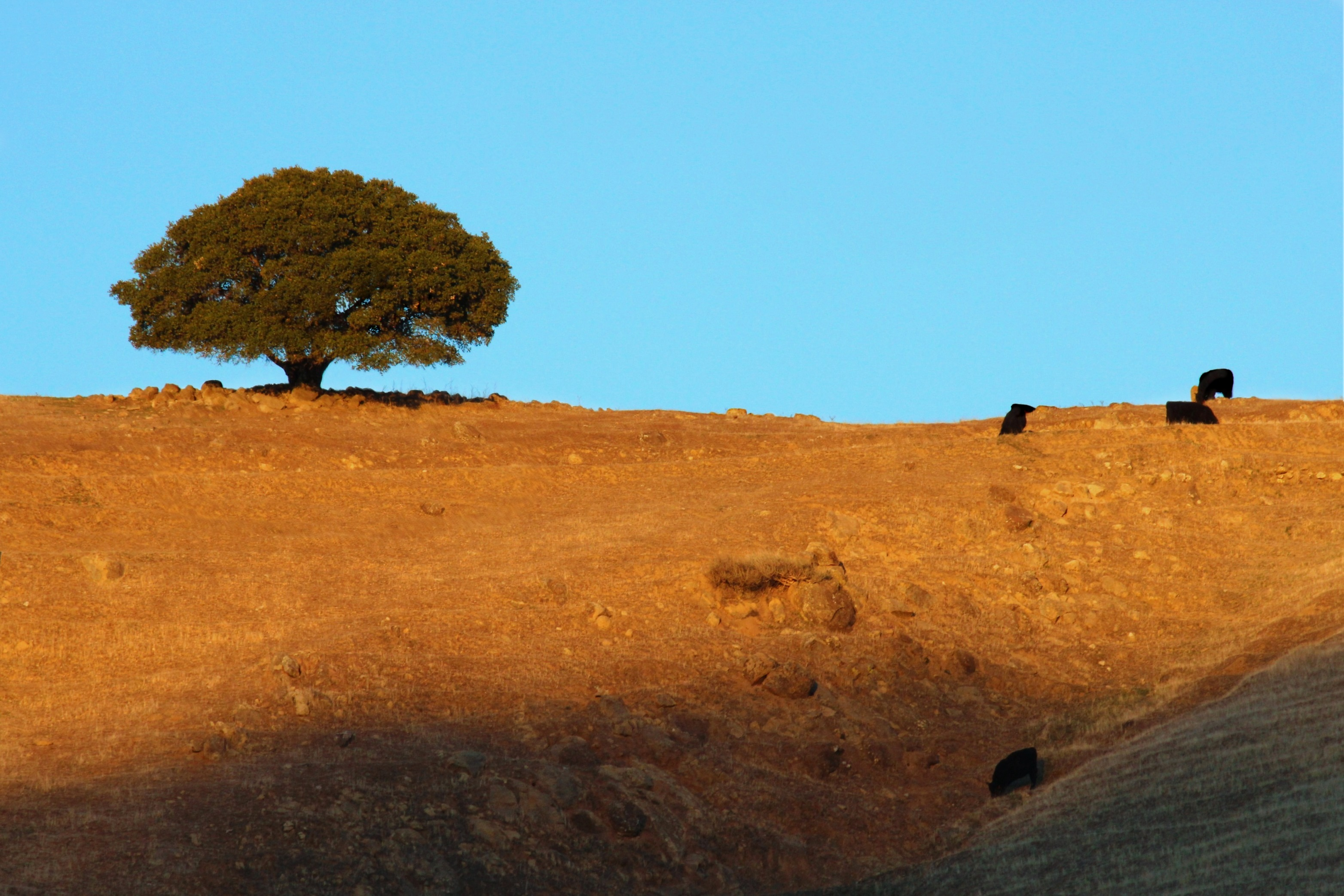

Diablo Foothills Regional Park is a 1,060 acres (4.3 km^{2}) regional park of the East Bay Regional Park District. It is located in Contra Costa County, in the East Bay region of northern California.

== Geography ==
The park lies in the Diablo Foothills of the northern Diablo Range, west of Mount Diablo and Mount Diablo State Park. The closest city is Walnut Creek.

Diablo Foothills Regional Park is bordered by: Castle Rock Regional Recreation Area on the east, and Shell Ridge Open Space to the north. Together, these three parks provide 18,000 acres (73 km^{2}) of parkland for visitors to enjoy.

== See also ==
- Diablo Range topics
- Parks in Contra Costa County, California
