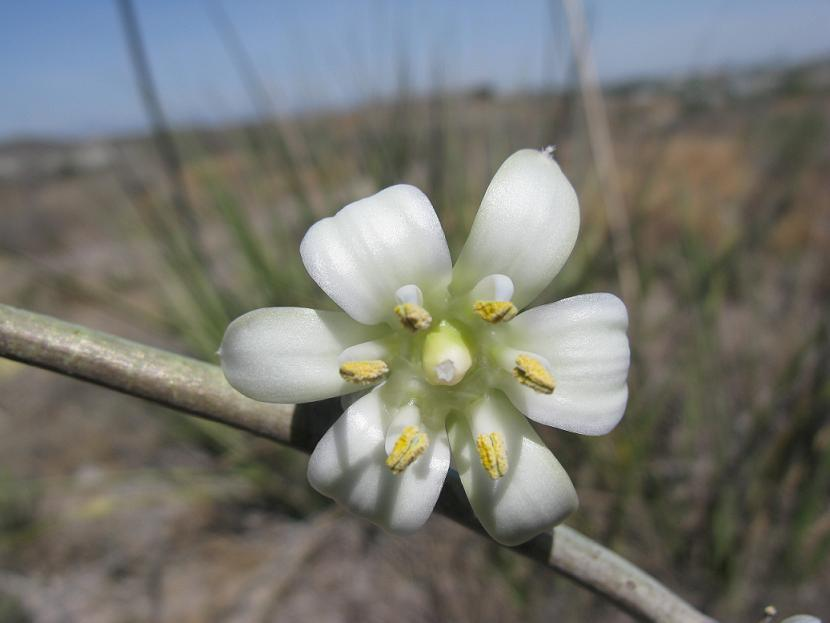

Scientific classification
- Kingdom: Plantae
- Clade: Tracheophytes
- Clade: Angiosperms
- Clade: Monocots
- Order: Asparagales
- Family: Asparagaceae
- Subfamily: Agavoideae
- Genus: Hesperaloe
- Species: H. funifera

Binomial name
- Hesperaloe funifera (K.Koch) Trel.

Synonyms
- Agave funifera (K.Koch) Lem.; Hesperaloe davyi Baker f.; Yucca funifera K. Koch

= Hesperaloe funifera =

Species of flowering plant

Hesperaloe funifera (Coahuilan Hesperaloe, Giant Hesperaloe, or Mexican false yucca) is a species of flowering plant in the family Asparagaceae. It is native to Texas (Val Verde County) and northern Mexico (Coahuila, San Luis Potosí, Nuevo León), but sometimes cultivated as an ornamental elsewhere.

Hesperaloe funifera grows on rocky slopes and open plains in the Tamaulipan mezquital and the eastern edges of the Chihuahuan Desert. It is a rosette-forming perennial. It has long, narrow, yellow-green blades up to 200 cm long but only 5 cm across. Flowering stalk can be up to 250 cm tall, with long branches. Flowers are green or white, often tinged with purple, about 25 mm across. The specific name funifera is derived from the Latin funis "rope" and fero "I bear" and thus signifies "bearer (provider) of rope" in reference to the plant's strong fibre, which may be used for this purpose.
