= CSE Insurance Group =

American insurance group

- Industry: Insurance
- Founded: 1949; 77 years ago
- Headquarters: Walnut Creek, California
- Area served: Arizona; California; Colorado; Idaho; Nevada; Oregon; Utah; Virginia; Washington D.C.
- Products: Property insurance casualty insurance
- Parent: Covéa Insurance Group
- Website: cseinsurance.com

CSE Insurance Group (formerly the Civil Service Employees Insurance Group) was an American provider of property and casualty insurance, based in Walnut Creek, California. It was founded in 1949 in San Francisco, before becoming a subsidiary of the French insurer Covéa. CSE stopped writing new business in 2023–2024 and was sold to Compre Group in April 2025.

== About ==
Both channels market the products: homeowners, auto, landlords, boat, liability, commercial and umbrella insurance. Areas of operation include Arizona, California, Colorado, Idaho, Nevada, Oregon, Utah, Virginia, Washington and Washington, D.C. CSE owns and markets a trademarked auto insurance product called SAVE (Savings Advantage by Vehicle) whereby drivers pay for the exact miles they drive during that year.

The company is a subsidiary of the Covéa Insurance Group (Société de Groupe d'Assurance Mutuelle Covéa) headquartered in Paris, France.

== History ==
CSE was founded in 1949 in San Francisco, California by Nelson Nichols. Originally, the company served only firefighters, police officers, postal workers and other government employees.

- In 1980, CSE extended its offerings to the general public.
- In 2009, CSE relocated from San Francisco, to Walnut Creek.
- In 2010 and 2011, CSE was included in Ward's 50 for top performing companies in the Property Casualty field.

A.M. Best Company has Given CSE Insurance Group a rating of A− (Excellent) and an issuer credit rating of A−.
