= Hesperaloe =

- Hesperaloe parviflora

Scientific classification
- Kingdom: Plantae
- Clade: Tracheophytes
- Clade: Angiosperms
- Clade: Monocots
- Order: Asparagales
- Family: Asparagaceae
- Subfamily: Agavoideae
- Genus: Hesperaloe; Engelm.

Genus of flowering plants

Hesperaloe (false yucca) is a genus of flowering plants in the family Asparagaceae, subfamily Agavoideae. It contains perennial yucca-like plants with long, narrow leaves produced in a basal rosette and flowers borne on long panicles or racemes. The species are native to the arid parts of Texas in the United States and Mexico and are sometimes cultivated as xerophytic ornamental plants.

The genus name is derived from the Greek word έσπερος (hesperos), meaning "western", and aloe, which the plants resemble. The genus is not closely related to Aloe, the latter belonging to a different family (Asphodelaceae).

== Species ==
Accepted species:

Image	Scientific name	Distribution
	Hesperaloe campanulata G.Starr	Nuevo León
	Hesperaloe chiangii (G.D.Starr) B.L.Turner	San Luis Potosí
	Hesperaloe engelmannii Krauskopf ex Baker	Texas
	Hesperaloe funifera (K.Koch) Trel.	Coahuila, Nuevo León, Texas, Sonora, San Luis Potosí
	Hesperaloe malacophylla Hochstätter & Mart.-Aval.	Tamaulipas
	Hesperaloe nocturna Gentry	Sonora
	Hesperaloe parviflora (Torr.) J.M.Coult. – Red Yucca	Coahuila, Texas
	Hesperaloe tenuifolia G.Starr	Sonora

Kimberly-Clark announced in August 2026 that hesperaloes are being developed as a potential replacement for tree fibers in hygiene products like toilet paper and paper towels.
