= Killing of Miles Hall =

2019 killing in California

Miles Hall on bicycle.

Miles Hall (February 15, 1996 – June 2, 2019) was a 23-year-old African American unarmed man who was fatally shot by police officers from the Walnut Creek California Police Department a few blocks from his home during a mental health emergency. His death sparked widespread protests, drawing attention to the issue of police brutality towards people with behavioral and mental health conditions. His killing has led to significant changes in California's approach to handling mental health emergencies, including the passage the Miles Hall Lifeline Act, funding the 988 alternative to 911 for mental health and suicide emergent situations in California. Additionally, in Contra Costa County, where Miles Hall was killed, A3: The Miles Hall Crisis Call Center has been established where 24/7 trained professional mental health staff triage calls and provide care over the phone or send in-person care teams if needed.

== Biography ==
Miles Anthony Hall was the first born to his parents, Scott and Taun Hall. Miles spent the majority of his life in Walnut Creek, California. He attended Parkmead Elementary School, Walnut Creek Intermediate School and graduated from Las Lomas High School. Miles was described by his family as a bright, kind, and talented young man. Miles had a history of mental health issues and had been diagnosed with schizophrenia.

== Death ==
On June 2, 2019, Miles Hall's family called the police to request help in managing his mental health crisis. Miles was experiencing delusions as a result of a serious mental illness. The 911 dispatchers were informed that Miles was having a mental health emergency and was unarmed. Miles’ family had previously worked with Walnut Creek Police to let them know about Miles’ condition and seek guidance about what to do during a mental health emergency.

According to witnesses, Hall was pacing back and forth in his yard while his family attempted to calm him down. Police officers, not the ones who knew Miles and his family and were trained in de-escalation during mental health emergencies, arrived on the scene. After a brief but hostile confrontation where they repeatedly shouted his name, escalating the situation, police fired multiple rounds, killing Miles Hall just a few blocks from his home. The police officers involved in the shooting, KC Hsiao and Melissa Murphy, were not charged with any crime.

== Aftermath ==
The shooting immediately sparked protests in Walnut Creek, with demonstrators calling for an independent investigation into the incident and for the police officers involved to be held accountable for their actions. The Contra Costa County District Attorney's office conducted an investigation into the shooting, but in October 2020, it announced that it would not be filing charges against the officers, citing insufficient evidence to support criminal charges. The Hall family and supporters have requested that the California Attorney General, Rob Bonta, review the case.

== The Miles Hall Foundation and FOSATH ==
In the immediate aftermath of Miles’ death, a grassroots organization of volunteers known as the Friends of Scott Alexis and Taun Hall (FOSATH) was created to support the Hall family and to demand justice for Miles. The group mobilized the public to support The Miles Hall Foundation and worked to bring attention to the issue of police racial bias and violence against people experiencing mental health crises.

In response to their son's death, Miles Hall's family, Taun, Scott and Alexis Hall founded The Miles Hall Foundation, a 501c3 organization aimed at promoting mental health awareness and reforming the way law enforcement responds to mental health emergencies. Taun Hall is the executive director.

The Miles Hall Foundation advocates for the use of mental health professionals in responding to mental health crises and for increased training for police officers in dealing with people with mental health issues. To honor Miles Hall, the mission of The Miles Hall Foundation is to "advocate for individuals and families impacted by mental illness, educate communities to reduce stigma and bias surrounding mental illness, and prevent criminalization and excessive use of force by law enforcement during mental health emergencies."

In addition, due to Miles’ death and the work done by The Miles Hall Foundation to advocate for other families like them with California legislators, the state of California passed Assembly Bill 988, the Miles Hall Lifeline and Suicide Prevention Act in September 2020, which requires that all CA law enforcement agencies in the state adopt policies and protocols for responding to mental health crises. The law also provides funding for crisis intervention training and establishes funding for the state’s 911 alternative, the 988 (telephone number) for mental health crises and 24/7 support.

The death of Miles Hall and the subsequent activism by his family and their supporters has contributed to a growing movement for police reform and greater accountability for law enforcement in responding to mental health crises.

Miles Hall's death is one of many incidents in which individuals experiencing mental health crises have been killed by police. According to a report by the Treatment Advocacy Center, individuals with untreated mental illness are 16 times more likely to be killed during a police encounter than individuals without mental illness.
