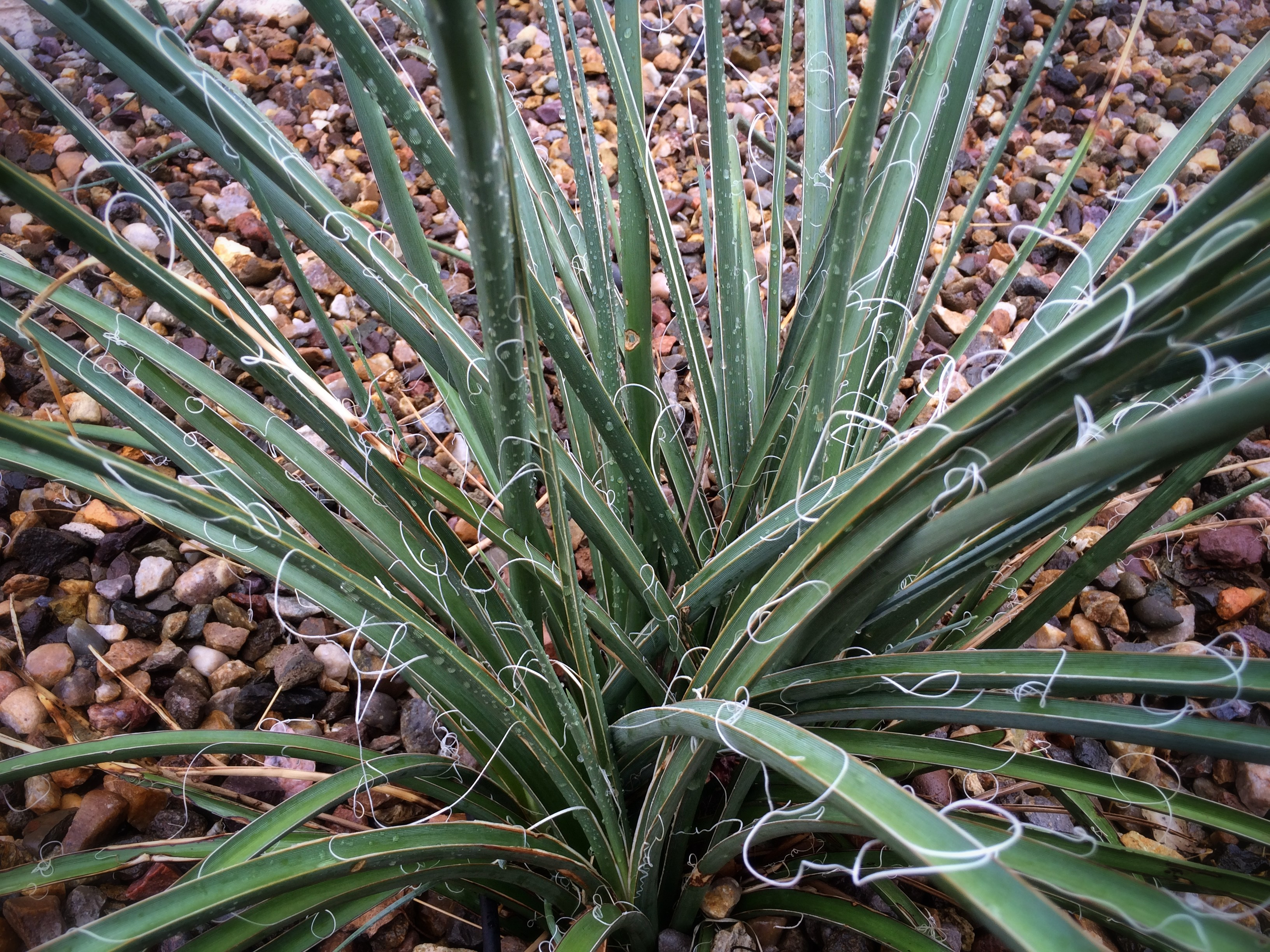

Scientific classification
- Kingdom: Plantae
- Clade: Tracheophytes
- Clade: Angiosperms
- Clade: Monocots
- Order: Asparagales
- Family: Asparagaceae
- Subfamily: Agavoideae
- Genus: Hesperaloe
- Species: H. parviflora

Binomial name
- Hesperaloe parviflora (Torr.) J.M.Coult.

Synonyms
- Yucca parviflora Torr.

= Hesperaloe parviflora =

Species of flowering plant

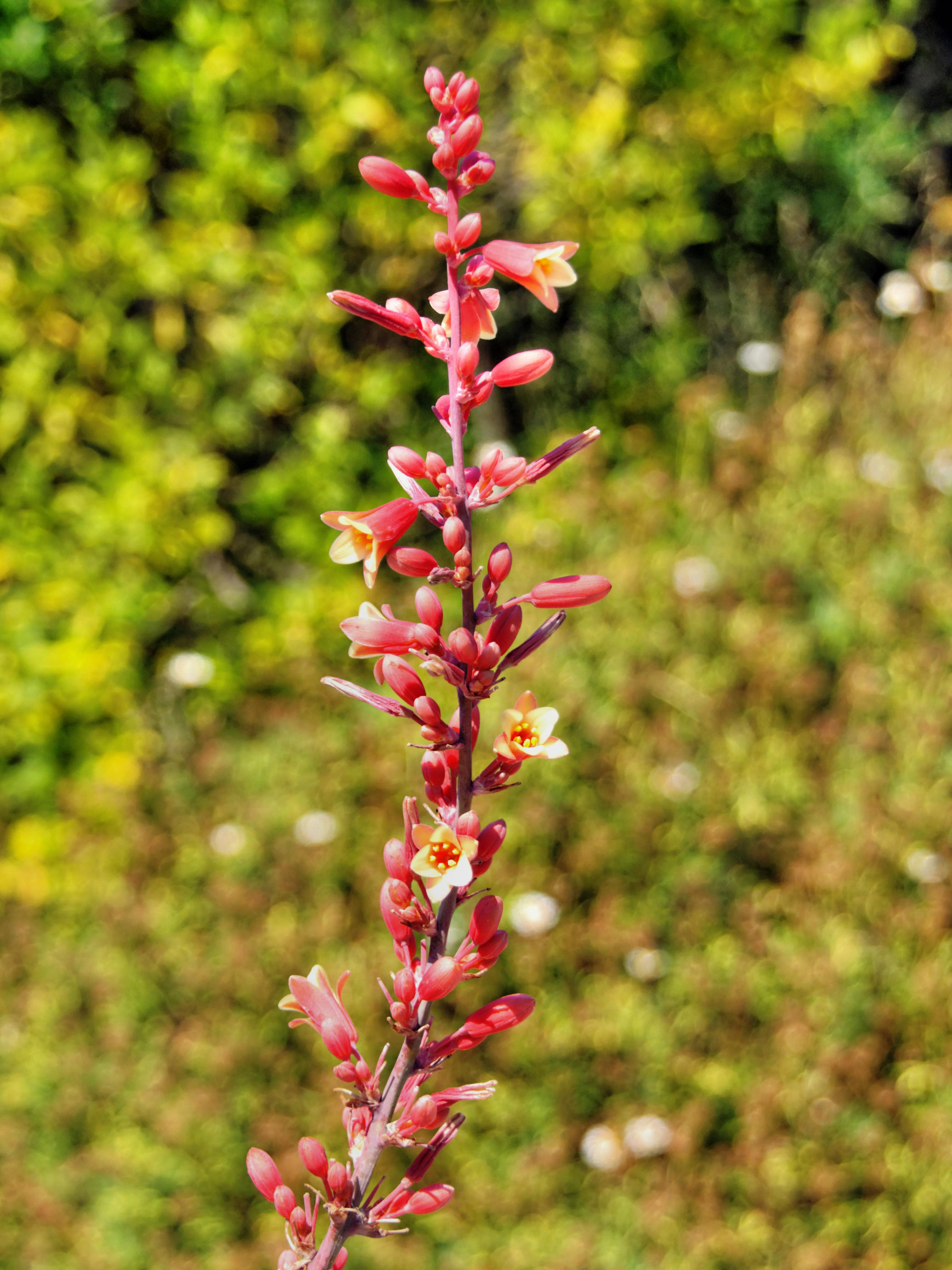
Hesperaloe parviflora flowers

Hesperaloe parviflora, also known as red yucca, hummingbird yucca, redflower false yucca and samandoque, is a succulent plant in the Asparagaceae family (subfamily Agavoideae) that is native to the Chihuahuan and Coahuilan deserts of Northern Mexico, as well as Central, Southern and Western Texas; today, it is often seen in roadside planting swathes and public areas, or used for corporate or office exterior landscaping. It is also quite popular in collector gardens and among private gardeners who are striving for a more water-wise approach.

Hesperaloe has narrow, funnel-like evergreen leaves with a slightly sharp tip, with a fringe of white, thread-like fibers along the edges—not unlike those seen on related species (such as Agave filifera or A. schidigera, for example). The species grows in clumps up to 3–6 ft (0.91–1.83 m) high by as wide. Vibrant red or yellow, tubular flowers are borne on branching, reddish-tinted inflorescences (measuring up to 1.5 m/5 ft in length) from late spring to midsummer; these blooms are often a highlight in the garden, said to resemble a natural "fireworks" display. The blossoms are a favorite of pollinators, especially hummingbirds. Pollinated blooms eventually develop into woody, "pistachio"-like seedpods, which hang off of the dried inflorescence until broken or falling off; after detaching, seedpods may lie dormant for many months until rainfall or other forms of hydration finally arrive to the desert.

The Latin specific epithet parviflora means "with small flowers".

H. parviflora has become very popular in the world of xeriscaping, especially in its native Texas and northern Mexico. In the state of Coahuila, it can be found in the Maderas del Carme Protected Area (Área Protegida Maderas del Carmen), just south of the U.S.-Mexico border from Big Bend National Park, where it may also be found. In Texas, it can be seen as far north as Lubbock and the Dallas-Fort Worth area, and as far east as Tyler. It has also been sighted further afield, such as in Pueblo, Colorado, and in Shreveport, Louisiana. Its popularity has increased significantly, seen frequently within Southern California (as well as in San Francisco and the Bay Area), parts of southern Nevada (Henderson and Paradise), and the area around Albuquerque, New Mexico. It is also a popular "green" choice for xeric landscaping in México, as seen in places like Hermosillo, Mexicali, Monterrey and Saltillo, to name a few.

H. parviflora has many benefits for the gardener, such as its innate drought tolerance and its love of high temperatures and bright, hot sun; likewise, it has developed natural adaptations to withstand winter temperatures at or below freezing. It is popular also for its architectural form, its pollinator-attracting flowers, and its overall ease-of-maintenance. Despite having slightly sharp (albeit blunted) leaf-ends, H. parviflora can be a much less daunting, less problematic plant choice in the garden, especially compared to the needle-sharp (and, in some species, serrated) foliage of genera like Agave, Sansevieria (now Dracaena) or Yucca. Furthermore, they do not spread or "pup" anywhere near as prolifically as the aforementioned genera tend to do, rather growing at a steadier, more manageable rate.
