= Mexican sunflower =

Mexican sunflower is a common name for several plants and may refer to:

- Tithonia diversifolia
- Tithonia rotundifolia
