= St. Paul's Episcopal Church (Walnut Creek, California) =

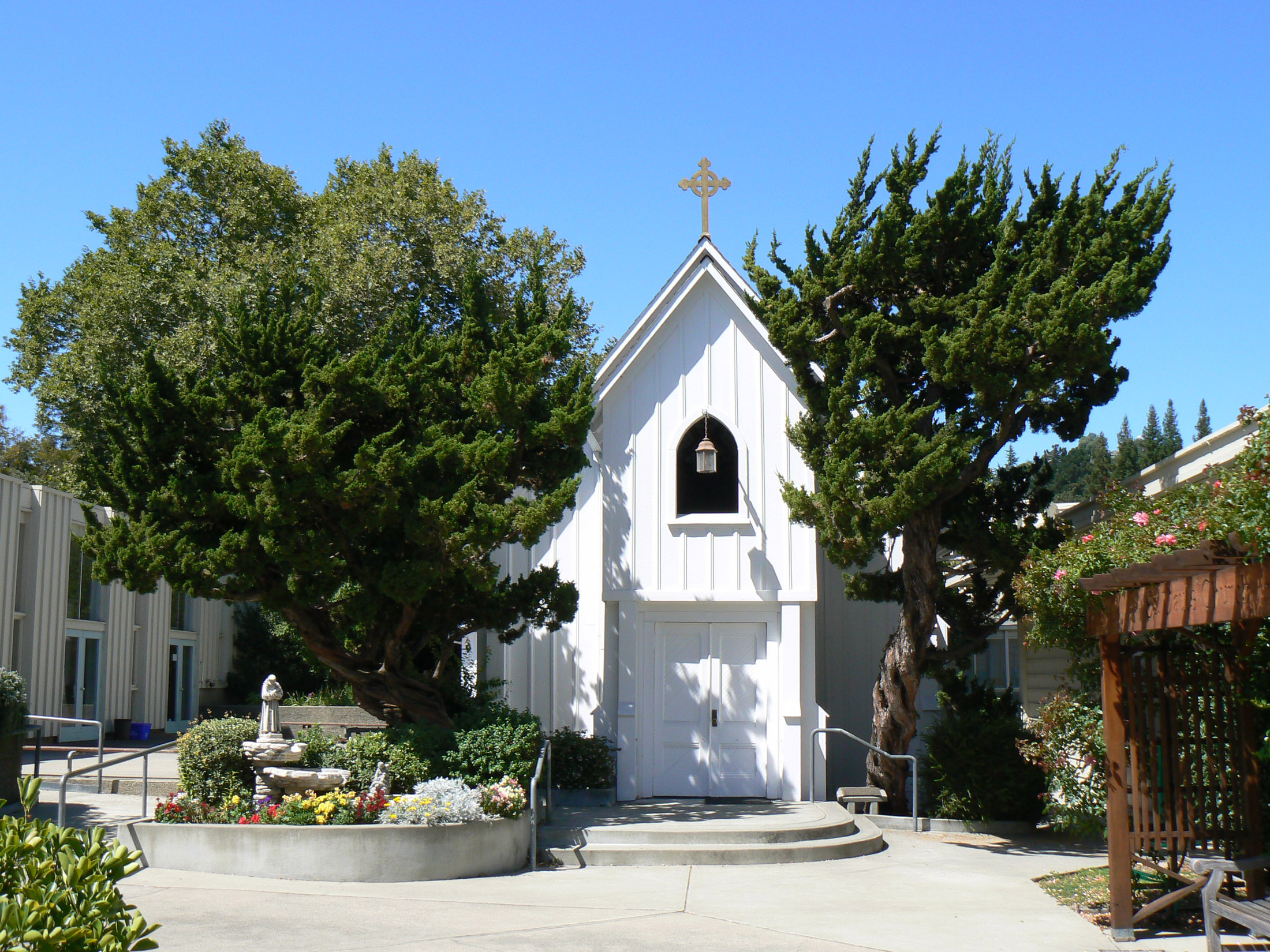
- St. Paul's Chapel, completed in 1889 on Locust St., moved in 1950 to Trinity Ave.
- St. Paul's Episcopal Church
- Location: 1924 Trinity Avenue; Walnut Creek, California
- Denomination: Episcopal
- Website: www.stpaulswc.org

History
- Dedication: St. Paul

Administration
- Province: VIII
- Diocese: California; The Rt. Rev. Marc Handley Andrus, Bishop
- Parish: St. Paul's

Clergy
- Rector: The Rev. Krista Fregoso

St. Paul's Episcopal Church is a historic Episcopal parish located in Walnut Creek, California, in the Episcopal Diocese of California. The Carpenter Gothic style chapel of St. Paul's is the oldest church building in Walnut Creek. It is still used for regular Sunday and midweek services including small weddings and memorial services. The Walnut Creek Historical Society named the chapel of St. Paul's a historical building.

== History ==
Episcopalians who lived in the Walnut Creek area in the 1850s had to travel via the ferry from Martinez to the first Episcopal mission in the area, St. Paul's in Benicia. The Right Reverend William Ingraham Kip, the first Bishop of California, conducted the first service at St. Paul's Benicia on October 21, 1854. As the population expanded, and as church records show the distances the clergy traveled to perform the pastoral offices at ranch homes, Grace Episcopal Church in Martinez was the next mission formally organized on March 12, 1870.

Episcopalians from the Walnut Creek area traveled the twelve-mile (19 km) trip to Martinez for Sunday services. The trip by horse and buggy usually took about two hours. Desiring to have a Sunday school for their children and church-sponsored activities closer to home, five families from the Walnut Creek area were drawn together by their associations at Grace, Martinez.

The five families were:

- Alfred Bernard Harrison was a native of Devonshire, England, and was educated in a naval school near London for service in the merchant fleet. While captain of a Cunard liner, he met Isabella McLeod, a passenger from Washington, D. C., and they were married in 1869. They lived for a very short time in Minnesota, and then came to San Francisco in 1872. In 1887, they moved to Danville, California, and raised various crops on their ranch. Mrs. Harrison was a correspondent for the Pacific Rural Press.
- Henry and Maria C. O’Neil emigrated from Pennsylvania and made their home on Charles Hill in Lafayette, California.
- Dr. Joseph E. Pearson was born in Livingston County, New York, and studied medicine after serving in the American Civil War. He practiced in the south and then moved to Illinois. There he met and married Sarah Atkinson, who had recently emigrated from Scotter, Lincolnshire, England. In 1876, the Pearsons settled in Bay Point (Port Chicago), California, where Dr. Pearson taught school. In March 1877, they moved to Walnut Creek, where Dr. Pearson taught in the local school for a short time before resuming the practice of medicine and opening a drug store.
- Mary E. Thorne was born in New York City in 1849 and moved to Hyde Park, New York, when she was eight years old. There she met and married John Thorne, probably in St. James’ Church. They came to California in 1869 and settled in the Saranap area of Walnut Creek.
- Cornelius and Mary Ann Johnson Waite met when Cornelius’ brother, John, could not take his music lesson from Mary Ann's father, and Cornelius went in his place to take a lesson on the cornet. They were married in England in 1865 and emigrated to Hannibal, Missouri. They came to California after his tannery was destroyed by a flood in the summer of 1873. In Oakland, Cornelius joined his brother in the contracting business. In 1884 or 1885, the Waites purchased land south of Walnut Creek (in the Rudgear area) and spent weekends only “in the country” until 1907 when Cornelius retired.

By mutual agreement rather than by any formal action, it was agreed that Isabella Harrison and Maria O’Neil would speak with Dr. James Abercrombie, Missionary-in-Charge of Grace Church Martinez, about the possibility of establishing an Episcopal Church in Walnut Creek. At this time in 1887, Dr. Abercrombie was 72 years of age. After long service in the ministry and serving as Rector of Trinity, Santa Barbara, he had retired in the Los Angeles area when Bishop Kip asked him to take care of Grace, Martinez. This he did in 1880. He was willing to assume this extra responsibility and on August 21, 1887, Dr. Abercrombie conducted the first Episcopal church service in Walnut Creek. Neighboring clergy assisted for intervening services, but it was Dr. Abercrombie's joy on October 9, 1887, to officiate at the first service of the Holy Communion in Walnut Creek.

== Building the church ==
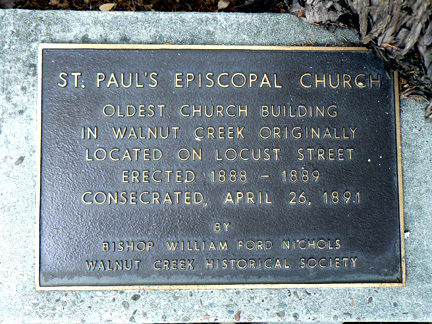
Historical Marker

Holding church services in the schoolhouse or in the town hall, the founding families of St. Paul's discussed the next step of building a church. A convenient Walnut Creek location was found on School Street (now Locust Street) and the price was right. On December 19, 1887, a gold coin in the amount of $175 was exchanged for a deed for the land on School Street.

Dr. Abercrombie was not well enough to handle a building program, so Bishop Kip assigned The Reverend Hamilton Lee to take charge of the work in Walnut Creek. Organization of the congregation took priority, so in June 1888, St. Paul's Mission, Walnut Creek, was formally organized, with Bishop Kip appointing Captain Alfred B. Harrison as Warden, John Thorne as Clerk, and Henry O’Neil as Treasurer.

Everyone set to so that the necessary funds might be raised and their church building become a reality. One project succeeded another and somehow the total reached the necessary $1600. Ground was broken in November 1888. The actual construction work was done by Cornelius Waite and his associates, with Captain Harrison's supervision. Mention should be made here of the devotion to detail of these men, for many years later (October 1950), when the structure was moved from the School Street (now Locust Street) location to its present site on Trinity Avenue, the consulting architect examined it and reported: “ the rest of the 60-year-old structure is in remarkably good shape, and in general it is put together with greater care and skill than one finds in most modern furniture – not to mention present-day wood framing.”

April 21, 1889, was a special day for the “founders”. It was Easter, their building was not quite completed, but Dr. Abercrombie appreciated how they felt, for he made the long trip from Martinez and offered the early Communion service in the new church. Only a few families were present.

The following Sunday, April 28, was the official opening day and a very festive service it was, with Dr. Abercrombie again officiating, assisted by The Reverend Hobart Chetwood and The Reverend Hamilton Lee. St. Paul's Mission was on its way. Walnut Creek was now served by four churches: the Methodist, the Presbyterian, St. Mary's Roman Catholic, and St. Paul's.

In May 1889, Captain Harrison represented St. Paul's Mission as a delegate to the Diocesan Convention held at the Church of the Advent in San Francisco, when St. Paul's Mission was admitted into union with the Diocese of California. The Convention Journal contains the first parochial report for the new mission: 12 communicants; 6 baptisms; 16 in Sunday school; 12 services; $2,014.90 annual income.

The fund-raising and the contributions grew, so only two years after the completion of the church building, the mortgage was cleared, and on April 26, 1891, the Right Reverend William Ford Nichols, Assistant Bishop of the Diocese of California, consecrated the church. Six people were in the first class confirmed at the same service.

== The mission becomes a parish ==
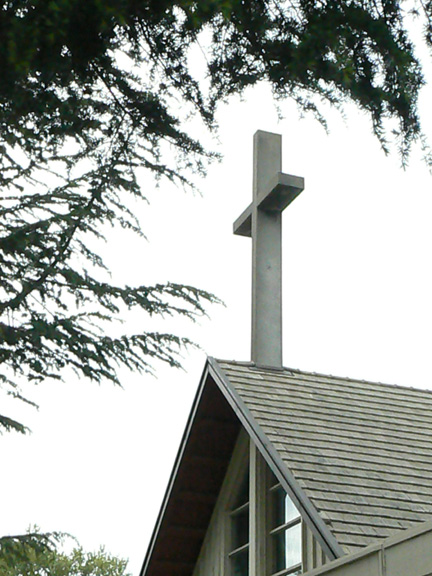
St. Paul's Church completed in 1954

St. Paul's remained a mission church from its beginning through the beginning of World War II. During this time, the various Bishops of California assigned vicars and other priests-in-charge served the congregation of St. Paul's. In 1939, the Reverend James P. Trotter came directly to St. Paul's from General Seminary in New York. He was, therefore, the Vicar who met head-on the vanguard of the great migration to California begun during World War II. It was during his tenure that St. Paul's achieved parish status in 1944 and the Reverend James P. Trotter became the first rector of St. Paul's.

In 1946, the Reverend James P. Trotter accepted a call and the Reverend David W. C. Graham came to St. Paul's as the second rector. During his tenure at St. Paul's, it was decided that the little church was no longer able to take care of the ever-increasing number of Episcopalians who were coming to Walnut Creek. In June 1947, $5,000 was paid for a 1-acre (4,000 m^{2}) lot on Walnut Street (now Trinity Avenue) as a site for a new church. The land was originally owned by a grandfather of Martin Stow (St. Paul's organist 1976). On October 20, 1950, the church was moved from its original location on Locust Street to the new property on Trinity Avenue. The parish hall was also moved.

The Reverend Wilfred H. Hodgkin came to St. Paul's in 1951 for ten years of service during a period of great expansion. The number of communicants during his tenure tripled from 359 to 941, in spite of the founding of three missions directly from the congregation. It was under his guidance that the new church building became a reality and a new parish hall became a necessity after the fire in the hall. When the new church building was completed in 1954, the original church building became the chapel.

== List of vicars and rectors ==
1. The Rev. James P. Trotter, vicar 1939–1944, rector 1944–1946):
  Born Victoria, British Columbia, Canada, son of Frank Forster Trotter and Edyth Alice James; graduate of the University of California and General Theological Seminary in New York; married to Ann Louise Alger;
2. The Rev. David Warwick Cranbrook Graham, rector 1946–1951:
  Born St. Louis, Missouri, son of David B. Graham and Helen Cranbrook; graduate of Occidental College, the Church Divinity School of the Pacific, and Virginia Theological Seminary; married to Margaret Ellen Wilson;
3. The Rev. Wilfred Haughton Hodgkin, rector 1951–1960:
  Born Berkeley, California; son of the Rev. Wilfred Reginald Haughton Hodgkin and Mary Hewitt Parsons; graduate of the University of California, Berkeley and the Church Divinity School of the Pacific; married to Ann Barratt Hall;
4. The Rev. Alfred Burdon Seccombe, rector 1961–1977:
  Born Beverly, Massachusetts; son of Will Seccombe and Mary Josephine Fowler; graduate of the University of Virginia and Virginia Theological Seminary; married to Elizabeth Clagett Welbourn;
5. The Rev. Stephen Dexter McWhorter, rector 1978–1987:
  Born Charleston, West Virginia; son of Joseph Clinton McWhorter and Joan Cottrell; graduate of West Virginia University, the University of Pittsburgh, and the Episcopal Theological School;
6. The Rev. Robert Eugene Reynolds, rector 1989–2005:
  Born Prescott, Arizona; son of Fred Kilby Reynolds and Miriam Evelyn; graduate of Arizona State University and the Church Divinity School of the Pacific; married to Elizabeth Walters;
7. The Rev. Martha Sylvia Ovalle Vásquez, rector 2006 – 2016:
  Born San Antonio, Texas; daughter of Joe F. Vasquez and Celia Ovalle; graduate of the Oblate School of Theology and the Episcopal Theological Seminary of the Southwest; married to Bill Ennis;
8. The Rev. Krista Fregoso, rector 2018–present:
  Born Akron, Ohio; daughter of Susan Marie Newman, and Dale Lee Harmon; graduate of University of North Carolina at Chapel Hill and the Church Divinity School of the Pacific; married to Tom Fregoso.
