= Justin R. Cannon =

American priest (born 1984)

The Reverend Justin R. Cannon
- Cannon in 2011
- Born: July 9, 1984 (age 42)
- Education: BA, Earlham College; M.Div., Church Divinity School of the Pacific

Ecclesiastical career
- Church: Episcopal Church
- Ordained: December 2011 (priest)

Justin Russell Cannon (born July 9, 1984) is an American Episcopal priest, an author, and a theologian.

Cannon was the founding director of Inclusive Orthodoxy, an affirming outreach ministry to lesbian, gay, bisexual and trans Christians. The ministry was centered on his booklet The Bible, Christianity, and Homosexuality (ISBN 978-1438249612), which is described by the Los Angeles Times as "an illuminating ... analysis that argues the Bible doesn't condemn faithful gay relationships" He also was the founder of Rainbow Christians, which was the internet's first gay Christian personals website, and was a regular contributor to the Q Christian Fellowship online forum.

== Career ==
Cannon graduated from Earlham College in 2006 where he received his B.A. in French and Francophone studies. During his studies, he served on the editorial board for The Earlham Literary Magazine and started the school's poetry appreciation group, Poetheads Anonymous. He is the editor of both Sanctified: An Anthology of Poetry by LGBT Christians (ISBN 978-1438247854) and Homosexuality in the Orthodox Church (ISBN 978-1456416874), and was interviewed in the 2012 film The Right to Love: An American Family.

Cannon's ministry was founded in 2005 under the name "Truth Sets Free" and in 2007 he relaunched his ministry website under the name "Inclusive Orthodoxy". According to his website, "Inclusive Orthodoxy seeks a revitalization of the faith, which is both orthodox in theology and grounded in the progressive message of the Gospel of Jesus Christ—a message of love, a proclamation of hope for the oppressed, an invitation towards all regardless of race, ethnicity, sex, gender, gender identity, or sexual orientation. We are calling for the Church to extend its inclusivity upon the foundation of Christian orthodoxy, and to embrace the radical implications of the Gospel message, not despite Scripture and Tradition, but in light of it." His ministry affirms the divine inspiration of the Bible, the sacredness of Tradition, and affirms "that there is a place within the full life and ministry of the Christian Church for lesbian, gay, bisexual, and transgender Christians, both those who are called to lifelong celibacy and those who are partnered".

Cannon was featured as a "Future Gay Hero" in the gay newsmagazine The Advocate shortly before he graduated from Earlham College. He subsequently appeared on The Michelangelo Signorile Show on SIRIUS OutQ, and his work was cited in The New York Times, and has even been well-received internationally as he was cited in the French LGBTQ magazine Préf ("Ainsi Soient-Ils" January/February #12 Issue). March 29, 2007, ABC News' Sacramento affiliate, News 10, ran a feature on Cannon and his Rainbow Christians website.

In 2006, Cannon was recognized as one of Out magazine's top 100 most influential gay people of the year. Each year Out magazine, a national gay and lesbian general interest publication, honors 100 individuals in a feature magazine issue and a special party/reception. Other honorees in 2006 included Rufus Wainwright, Anne Hathaway, Michael Kors Iman, John Cameron Mitchell, and Lance Bass. In 2007, he was honored as one of Instinct magazine's Leading Men of the Year for his activism in the gay community.

From 2009 to 2012 he worked as program manager of Episcopal Charities, San Francisco. Cannon was ordained as a deacon on June 4, 2011, and as a priest on December 3, 2011, in the Episcopal Church through the Diocese of California by Marc Andrus.

Cannon is also the founder and director of a ministry called Holy Hikes, which was founded in 2010. Holy Hikes meets monthly to celebrate the Eucharist outdoors in the context of a nature hike. Cannon writes on his website, "This ministry is a response to creation's longing. We gather not to 'use' or simply 'care for' the earth, but to recognize our communion with all of life. It is in recognizing this interconnectedness that we can move forward in fully serving the Creator."

In 2013, Cannon co-founded the Society for Eastern Rite Anglicanism (SERA) with Fr. Brendan E. Williams, which was an organization aimed at establishing an Eastern Rite within the Anglican Communion. Cannon served four years as the minister of Saint Giles Episcopal Church and currently serves as rector of All Saints Episcopal Church in San Leandro, California.

== See also ==
- List of Christian denominational positions on homosexuality
- Blessing of same-sex unions in Christian churches
- Religion and homosexuality
- History of Christianity and homosexuality
- Queer theology
- The Bible and homosexuality
- Anglican views of homosexuality
- Homosexuality and Christianity
- Category:LGBTQ religious organizations
