= The Other Side (Pike book) =

1968 book on a poltergeist by Bishop James Pike

- Title page for The Other Side (1968)
- Author: James Pike; Diane Kennedy
- Language: English
- Genre: Non-fiction
- Publisher: Doubleday; Dell Publishing
- Publication date: 1968
- Publication place: United States

The Other Side is a book written by Bishop James Pike with Diane Kennedy about his experiences of paranormal phenomena following his son's suicide in New York City in 1966. The book was published by Doubleday and Co. Inc. in 1968, and in paperback by Dell Publishing in 1969.

== Synopsis ==
Pike, an Episcopalian, was the fifth Bishop of California. When poltergeist activity following his son's death mounted up, he led a public (and for the church, embarrassing) pursuit of various spiritualist and clairvoyant methods of contacting his deceased son in order to reconcile. In September 1967, Pike participated in a televised séance with his dead son through the medium Arthur Ford, who served at the time as a Disciples of Christ minister. Pike described these experiences in detail in the book.
