= Saint Giles Episcopal Church =

Coordinates: 37°50′28″N 122°6′31″W

St. Giles' Episcopal Church
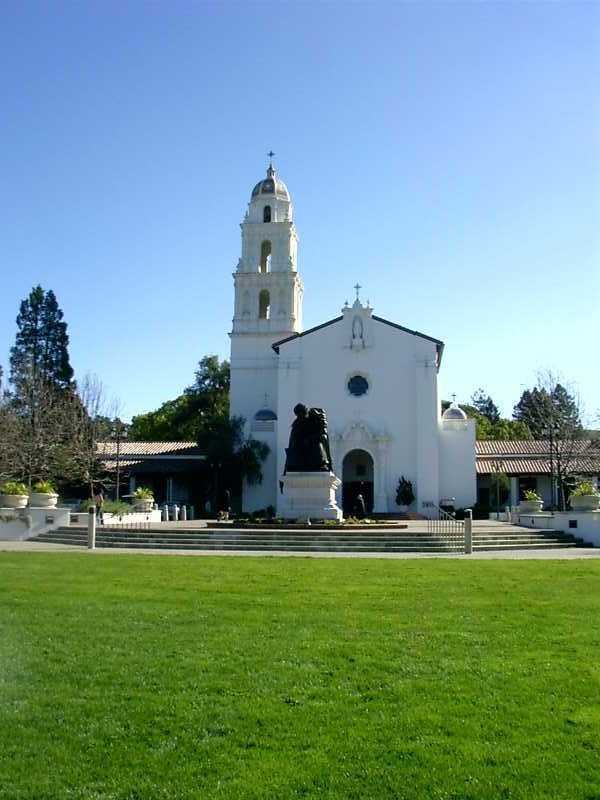
- Chapel at Saint Mary’s College of California
- St. Giles' Episcopal Church
- Location: 1928 Saint Mary’s Road; Moraga, California
- Denomination: Episcopal

History
- Dedication: St. Giles

Administration
- Province: VIII
- Diocese: California
- Deanery: Contra Costa
- Parish: St. Giles’

Clergy
- Priest: None (permanently closed)

Saint Giles Episcopal Church was an Episcopal parish located in Moraga, California, United States, and part of the Episcopal Diocese of California. The community worshiped in the chapel at Saint Mary's College of California. Saint Giles closed permanently in 2017.

== History ==
In June 1961, the Right Reverend G. Richard Millard, then suffragan bishop of the Episcopal Diocese of California, met with a group of Episcopalians to form a in Orinda, California. Bishop James Pike, the fifth bishop of Episcopal Diocese of California, recommended the name St. Giles for the community because "it was more Anglican and sufficiently distinctive so that no one would think the mission was anything but an Episcopal church". On June 8, 1961, the papers were signed and St. Giles' Mission was born. A vicarage was then built on the newly purchased land.

A church building, however, was never built on that property, giving rise to St. Giles' recognition as a church "without walls of its own", a phrase the community continued to use to describe itself. The parish held its worship services at Inland Valley School in Orinda and shortly thereafter moved to Camino Pablo School in Moraga. St. Giles sold the original vicarage and land in 1972 and used the proceeds to enter into a joint venture with Moraga Valley Presbyterian Church, where St. Giles held worship services for 10 years.

In 1982, the Diocese of California made an arrangement with Saint Mary's College of California, approved by the papal nuncio, which allowed for St. Giles to worship in the chapel at St. Mary's College. St. Giles became financially self-supporting in 1988 and became recognized as a parish in 1995. Saint Giles continues to worship in the chapel at Saint Mary’s College and engages in regular ecumenical dialogue with the students, faculty, staff, and Lasallian brothers who live and work at the college.

== Services ==
Saint Giles’ primary worship service is a celebration of the Holy Eucharist, held Sunday mornings at 9:00am. In addition to this service, the community holds services on high feast days including Christmas Eve, Ash Wednesday, Good Friday, and Holy Saturday. Other rites and sacraments celebrated throughout the year include baptism, confirmation, matrimony, funerals and memorial services.

Each year, on the Sunday closest to Saint Giles' feast day, the congregation held an outdoor Eucharist at Moraga Commons and on the Sunday closest to St. Francis of Assisi’s feast day, the congregation held a blessing of animals which drew people from throughout the local community.

== List of clergy ==
1. William J. Frankhuizen, vicar 1961
2. James H. Kirchhoffer, vicar 1961 – 1967
3. G. William Beale, vicar 1967 – 1969
4. Russell C. Moore and T. C. Yao, co-vicars 1969 - 1980
5. Lois Pinneo, rector 1980 – 1999
6. Rob McCann, interim rector 1999 – 2001
7. Duane Sisson, rector 2001 – 2010
8. Teri Gilmore, interim rector 2010-2011
9. Justin R. Cannon, priest-in-charge 2012 – 2016
10. Peter Champion, priest-in-charge 2016-2017
