= James Tramel =

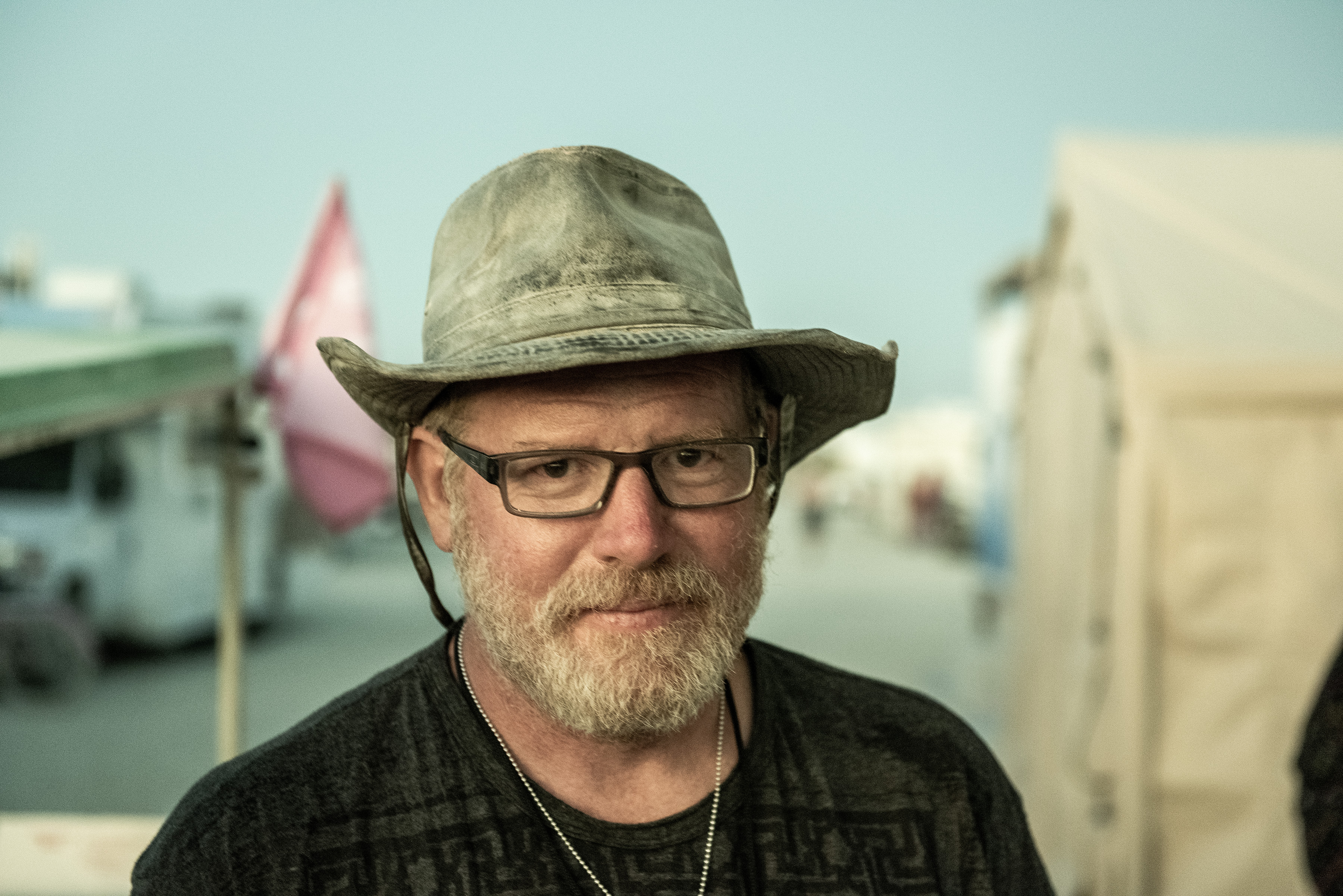
James Tramel aka Logistic at Burning Man.

James Tramel (born c. 1967) is a former Episcopal priest who was ordained while serving prison time for murder, and the first convict ever ordained in the Episcopal Church while still in prison. Soon after being paroled from prison in 2006, he became rector of Trinity Episcopal Church in San Francisco. He has been a public spokesman for prisoners' rights, testifying in favor of parole for juvenile offenders and supporting prisoner-victim reconciliation programs.

Tramel was 17 years old and attending Northwestern Preparatory School, a private military preparatory academy in Santa Barbara. He had been nominated to the United States Air Force Academy by Senator Barry Goldwater. On August 3, 1985, Tramel participated in the fatal stabbing of a 29-year-old homeless man in a park in Santa Barbara, mistaking his identity for that of a rival gang member. Tramel and his then-roommate were both sentenced to a minimum of 15 years in prison for second-degree murder. While in prison he took correspondence courses, earning an undergraduate degree in business and a master's degree in theology. He was ordained in 2005, while still an inmate at Solano State Prison, by Bishop William E. Swing.

Swing harshly criticized Governor Arnold Schwarzenegger in 2004 when the governor denied Tramel's parole, calling Schwarzenegger "a 90-pound moral weakling". In March 2006, Schwarzenegger reversed his decision and paroled Tramel.

Immediately upon his parole, Tramel became an assistant pastor at the Church of the Good Shepherd in Berkeley, California. On the following February he left to become rector of Trinity Church.

In July 2008, he was suspended for two years from his ministry for sexual abuse of a parishioner. The church did not contest this accusation and Tramel admitted to the abuse.

Tramel currently runs a long-standing theme camp at Burning Man, where he goes by the name Logistic. His camp is called Entheos, named after Entheogen.
