= Mary Tarcisia Lakot =

- Other name: Sister Mary Tarcisia Lakot
- Known for: Acholi Religious Leaders Peace Initiative

Sister Mary Tarcisia Lakot is a Ugandan nun known for her significant contributions to peacebuilding efforts in Northern Uganda. She is a member of Acholi Religious Leaders Peace Initiative (ARLPI), an interfaith organization dedicated to conflict transformation in the region. In 2013, Sister Mary was mentioned by the Norwegian Nobel Committee as a contender for the Nobel Peace Prize alongside Malala Yousafzai who went on to win the prize.

== Acholi Religious Leaders Peace Initiative ==
Sister Mary is on the staff of the Acholi Religious Leaders Peace Initiative (ARLPI), an organisation which played a crucial role in advocating for peace, mediating between the Ugandan government and the LRA, and supporting reconciliation efforts in the region. As a representative for ARLPI, she joined the Moral Imagination Pilot Project team from 2006 to 2008, a project which aimed to deepen relationships, integrate action-based learning, and foster cultural understanding.

== Notable achievements ==
At the New Challenges for Catholic Peacebuilding conference held in Rome in May 2012, she spoke on the topic of interreligious and ecumenical peace-building, and reconciliation.

Sister Mary was recognized for her outstanding contributions to peacebuilding and her dedication to advancing the principles of the United Religions Initiative (URI), particularly toward conflict resolution and social harmony across the continent of Africa. The award was presented by Ambassador Mussie Hailu, an Ethiopian diplomat, humanitarian, and advocate for global peace.
