= Henry H. Shires =

Episcopal bishop of California

The Right Reverend Henry H. Shires
- Suffragan Bishop of California
- Church: Episcopal Church
- Diocese: California
- Elected: April 19, 1950
- In office: 1950–1958
- Successor: Richard Millard

Orders
- Ordination: June 1911 (deacon); June 1912 (priest) by William Croswell Doane
- Consecration: September 29, 1950 by Henry Knox Sherrill

Personal details
- Born: June 7, 1886 Bernardsville, New Jersey, United States
- Died: April 29, 1961 (aged 74) Berkeley, California, United States
- Buried: Grace Cathedral, San Francisco
- Denomination: Anglican
- Parents: Holman Hall Shires & Lucy Pateman Plumb
- Spouse: Mabel Clare Millis (m. 1911)
- Children: Henry Millis Shires

Henry Herbert Shires (June 7, 1886 – April 29, 1961) was an American cleric who served as suffragan bishop of the Episcopal Diocese of California from 1950 to 1958.

== Early life and education ==
Shires was born in Bernardsville, New Jersey, on June 7, 1886, to Holman Hall Shires (1855-1912) and Lucy Pateman Plumb Shires (1861-1943). He studied at Cornell University and graduated in Mechanical Engineering in 1908. In 1911 he also graduated from the General Theological Seminary with a Bachelor of Divinity. He was also awarded a Doctor of Divinity in 1935 from the Pacific School of Religion, and an honorary Doctor of Sacred Theology from the General Theological Seminary in 1941.

== Ordained ministry ==
Shires was ordained deacon in June 1911 and was ordained as a priest in June 1912 by Bishop William Croswell Doane of Albany. On November 8, 1911, he married Mabel Clare Millis and had one son. He served at St John's Church in Bernardsville, New Jersey, from 1911 until 1913 and then as rector of Christ Church in Jerome, Arizona, between 1913 and 1915. In 1915 he became rector of St Luke's Church in Prescott, Arizona, and then in 1918 he transferred to Christ Church in Alameda, California. In 1935 he accepted the post of Dean of the Church Divinity School of the Pacific, where he remained until 1950.

== Bishop ==
On April 19, 1950, Shires was elected suffragan bishop of California during a diocesan convention. He was consecrated on September 29, 1950, in Grace Cathedral with Presiding Bishop Henry Knox Sherrill as primary consecrator. He retired in 1958 but served as an archdeacon until a successor was elected and consecrated in 1960. He died at his home of a heart attack on April 29, 1961. His son, Henry Millis Shires, became an Episcopal priest and was professor of New Testament at the Episcopal Theological Seminary in Cambridge, Massachusetts.
