= Richard Millard =

American suffragan bishop (1914–2018)

The Right Reverend Richard Millard
- Suffragan Bishop of California
- Church: Episcopal Church
- Diocese: California
- Elected: 1959
- In office: 1960–1978
- Predecessor: Henry H. Shires

Orders
- Ordination: June 1939 (priest) by Henry Knox Sherrill
- Consecration: February 2, 1960 by Arthur C. Lichtenberger

Personal details
- Born: October 2, 1914 Dunsmuir, California, United States
- Died: June 15, 2018 (aged 103) Portola Valley, California, United States
- Buried: Grace Cathedral, San Francisco
- Denomination: Anglican
- Parents: George Ellis Millard & Constance Rainsberry
- Spouse: Mary Louise Gessling (m. 1939; died 2005)
- Children: George, Martha, Joseph

George Richard Millard (October 2, 1914 – June 15, 2018) was a suffragan bishop of the Episcopal Diocese of California from 1960 to 1978.

== Early life ==
George Richard Millard was born on October 2, 1914, in Dunsmuir, California, to George Ellis Millard (1876-1944) and Constance (Rainsberry) Millard (1878-1955). He attended high school in Sacramento, California, and later graduated with a Bachelor of Arts from the University of California, Berkeley in 1936, and then in 1938 a Bachelor of Divinity from the Episcopal Theological School in Cambridge, Massachusetts. He was awarded an honorary Doctor of Divinity from the Church Divinity School of the Pacific in 1960 and a Master of Arts from the Santa Clara University in 1983.

== Ordained ministry ==
Millard was ordained deacon in July 1938 by Bishop Archie W. N. Porter of Northern California and priest in June 1939 by Bishop Henry Knox Sherrill of Massachusetts. He initially served as curate at St James' Church in New York City from 1938 to 1939 until he became curate of St John's Church in Waterbury, Connecticut. In 1941 he became curate at St James' Church in Danbury, Connecticut, while in 1943 he became the rector of the same church. He was also rector of Christ Church in Alameda, California, between 1951 and 1960.

== Episcopacy ==
Millard was elected Suffragan Bishop of California in 1959. He was then consecrated bishop on February 2, 1960, in Grace Cathedral with Presiding Bishop Arthur C. Lichtenberger as chief consecrator. He remained in office until his retirement in 1978. He was then appointed as Suffragan Bishop for the Convocation of Episcopal Churches in Europe, where he served until 1980. He then worked at the Episcopal Church Center in New York, after which he attended Saint Mary's College of California where he completed a degree in psychology. He then went on to work as a Veterans Hospital Chaplain till 2005.

== Personal life ==
He married Mary Louise Gessling on June 29, 1939. They had three children: George, Martha and Joseph. His son George died in 2002 and his wife Mary died at the age of 90 on August 15, 2005. He turned 100 in October 2014. He died on June 15, 2018, at the age of 103.
