= William E. Swing =

The Right Reverend William Edwin Swing D.D.
- Seventh Bishop of California
- Church: Episcopal Church
- Diocese: California
- Elected: 1979
- In office: 1979–2006
- Predecessor: C. Kilmer Myers
- Successor: Marc Andrus

Orders
- Ordination: December 20, 1961 by Wilburn C. Campbell
- Consecration: September 29, 1979 by John Allin

Personal details
- Born: August 26, 1936 (age 90) Huntington, West Virginia, United States
- Denomination: Anglican
- Parents: William Lee Swing & Elsie Bell Holliday
- Spouse: Mary Taylor (m. 1961)
- Children: 2
- Education: Kenyon College

William Edwin Swing (born 26 August 1936) is a retired bishop of the Episcopal Church in the United States. He was the Bishop of California, based in San Francisco, from 1980 to 2006.

== Education ==
Born in West Virginia, Swing received a A.B. and D.D. from Kenyon College in 1958 and 1981, a M.Div. and D.D. from Virginia Theological Seminary in 1961 and 1980, L.H.D. from the University of San Francisco, 2005, D.D. Church Divinity School of the Pacific in 2007, a D.H.L from the Pacific Graduate School of Psychology in 2009. Swing is the recipient of many honorary doctoral degrees including the Jesuit sponsored University of San Francisco.

== Priest and Bishop ==
Swing was ordained a deacon at Huntington, West Virginia, on June 11, 1961; he was ordained a priest at Wheeling, West Virginia, on December 20, 1961. He was appointed curate of St Matthew’s Church in Wheeling, West Virginia from 1961–63; vicar of St Thomas’ Church in Weirton, and St Matthew’s Church in Chester, West Virginia from 1963–69; and then rector of St Columba's Church in Washington, D.C. from 1969-79.

He was elected as the seventh Bishop of California in 1979 and was consecrated at Grace Cathedral, San Francisco, on September 29, 1979. He is the Founder and President of the United Religions Initiative (URI), an international NGO working to promote interfaith cooperation. He is an author and inspirational speaker and has received numerous awards for his commitment to service.

== Work ==
During his time as bishop, Swing was a pioneer in responding to the HIV/AIDS epidemic and to homelessness. He served for over two decades on the board of the American Foundation for AIDS Research and was active in San Francisco on a daily basis with alcohol and drug rehabilitation, Latino immigrant ministries, and care for the elderly and homeless.

Swing founded the United Religions Initiative as a model to the United Nations. In 1996 he traveled to China, Japan, South Korea, India, the Middle East, and Europe seeking guidance and commitment from leaders of many of the world’s religions, including the Dalai Lama, Mother Teresa, the Shankaracharya of Kanchipuram, Islam’s Grand Mufti of Egypt, and the Archbishop of Canterbury.

In 2008 the Bishop Swing Community House, a permanent supportive housing for chronically homeless adults, in the South of Market, San Francisco was named after him.

== See also ==
- James Tramel

== Bibliography ==
- The Sacred and the Silly: A Bishop's Playful and Eventful Life (Xoxoxpress, 2017) ISBN 9781880977460
- A Bishop's Quest (2015), Xoxox Press ISBN 9781880977385
- A Swing with a Crosier (1999), Episcopal Diocese of California
- The Coming United Religions (1998), CoNexus Press ISBN 9780963789754
- Building Wisdom’s House (1997), Addison Wesley Longman, co-authored with Rabbi Stephen Pearce, John Schlegel, S.J., and Bonnie Menes, KahnPublisher
