= James Pike =

American Episcopal bishop (1913–1969)

The Right Reverend James Pike
- Bishop of California
- Pike in 1966
- Church: Episcopal Church
- See: California
- Elected: February 4, 1958
- In office: 1958–1966
- Predecessor: Karl M. Block
- Successor: C. Kilmer Myers

Orders
- Ordination: December 21, 1944 (deacon); November 1, 1946 (priest) by Angus Dun
- Consecration: May 15, 1958 by Henry Knox Sherrill

Personal details
- Born: February 14, 1913 Oklahoma City, Oklahoma, United States
- Died: c. September 2, 1969 (aged 56) Wadi Mashash, Israel
- Denomination: Anglican (prev. Roman Catholic)
- Spouse: Jane Alvies (m. 1938; civilly div. 1941); Esther Yanovsky (m. 1942; div. 1966); Diane Kennedy (m. 1968)
- Education: University of Southern California; Yale University; Union Theological Seminary

James Albert Pike (February 14, 1913–c. September 3–7, 1969) was an American Episcopal bishop, accused heretic, writer, and one of the first mainline religious figures to appear regularly on television.

Pike's outspoken, and to some of his fellow bishops, heretical, views on many theological and social issues made him one of the most controversial public figures of his time. He was an early proponent of the ordination of women and racial desegregation within mainline churches. The chain smoking Pike was the fifth Bishop of California and, a few years before he began to explore spiritualism and psychic phenomena in an effort to contact his deceased son, became a recovering alcoholic.

== Early life ==
Pike was born in Oklahoma City on February 14, 1913 to James A. Pike and Pearl Agatha Wimsatt Pike. His father died when he was two and he moved to California with his mother who married California attorney Claude McFadden. Pike, who was Roman Catholic, graduated from Hollywood High School in 1930 and considered entering the priesthood; however, in the two years he attended Santa Clara University, a private Jesuit school, he came to consider himself an agnostic. Pike transferred to the University of California at Los Angeles (UCLA) for a year, then transferred again to the University of Southern California (USC), where he received his B.A. in 1934 and an LL.B. from the university's law school in 1936. That same year, he was admitted to the California bar.

Pike received a Sterling Fellowship and earned a J.S.D. from Yale Law School in 1938. After leaving Yale, he served as a staff attorney for the New Deal-era Securities and Exchange Commission in Washington, D.C. from 1938 to 1942, in addition to lecturing on federal procedure at Catholic University of America Law School (1938–1939) and on civil procedure at George Washington University Law School (1939–1942). He then established the law firm of Pike and Fischer with a fellow attorney, specializing in the publication of books on federal judicial and administrative procedure.

Pike married Jane Alvies, a lapsed Christian Scientist agnostic, in Los Angeles on August 14, 1938. They separated at the beginning of 1940 and were divorced in October 1941. On January 29, 1942, he married Esther Yanovsky (a daughter of Russian Jewish immigrants) whom he had met while she was attending his law class at George Washington.

== Conversion and early church life ==
During the Second World War, Pike joined the Office of Naval Intelligence in 1942, and later sought and received a commission as Lieutenant (jg) in the Naval Reserve. In 1943, he was accepted as a postulant in the Protestant Episcopal Church. In 1944, he moved to the United States Maritime Commission (MARCOM), War Shipping Administration, but then requested and received inactive duty status due to his ordination as deacon by the Bishop of Washington D.C., Angus Dun, on December 21, 1944.

His first appointment in the church was as a curate at St. John's Episcopal Church, Lafayette Square, in Washington, D.C. from 1944 to 1946, while also serving as chaplain to Episcopal students at George Washington University.

Pike first entered Virginia Theological Seminary (1945–1946) and then Union Theological Seminary (B.Div., 1951) to prepare for the priesthood. He was ordained as a priest on November 1, 1946. He then accepted an appointment as Rector of Christ Church, Poughkeepsie, where he served as chaplain to students at Vassar College. In 1949, he became chaplain at Columbia University, where, together with Professor Ursula Niebuhr, he established Columbia's Department of Religion.

Pike graduated from Union Theological Seminary in 1951. Remaining on the adjunct faculty of Columbia, he became the Dean of the Cathedral of St. John the Divine in 1952. Using his new position and media savvy, he made the pulpit a place for discussion of the religious and social problems of the day, vociferously opposing the local Catholic bishops over their attacks on Planned Parenthood and their opposition to birth control. He accepted an invitation to receive an honorary doctorate from The University of the South in Tennessee, but then publicly declined after finding that the university did not admit African Americans. An example of Pike's use of the media is how he released his letter to The New York Times before it was delivered to Sewanee's trustees: they heard the news when reporters called for reactions. It was also at this time that he publicly challenged Senator Joseph McCarthy's allegation that 7,000 American pastors were part of a Kremlin conspiracy; when the newly elected President Dwight D. Eisenhower backed up Pike, McCarthy and his movement began to lose their influence.

Pike was now known as a spokesman for liberal Protestantism and, in 1955, was invited by the American Broadcasting Company (ABC) to host his own weekly television program, The Dean Pike Show, (later renamed The Bishop Pike Show) which made celebrities of Pike and his wife, and soon eclipsed Bishop Fulton J. Sheen's long-running Life Is Worth Living in popularity. Common topics included birth control, abortion laws, racism, capital punishment, apartheid, antisemitism, and farm worker exploitation, with Pike weighing in at the end to give what he called "a five-minute commercial for God." In 1956, he participated in a trip to Israel to study and report on Arab refugee problems and, in 1957, he was appointed to the seven-person (Harold Lionel) Zellerbach Commission, created by the International Rescue Committee, to study the European Iron Curtain refugee issue.

Between 1952 and 1958, Pike also wrote seven books, including quite orthodox and widely read titles like Doing the Truth and Beyond Anxiety.

== Election as bishop ==
Pike was elected on the sixth ballot as bishop coadjutor of California on February 4, 1958 and was consecrated bishop on May 15, 1958. He then succeeded to the see on September 20, 1958, following the death of his predecessor, Karl Morgan Block, to become the fifth Bishop of California. He served in this position until 1966, when, plagued by personal loss, absorbed with the paranormal, tired of diocesan attacks, wrangling and administration, and exhausted from hyperactivity, he resigned his office to become a senior fellow for the Center for the Study of Democratic Institutions in Santa Barbara, California, a liberal think tank founded by Robert Maynard Hutchins, where he began an extensive schedule of speaking engagements. During this period, he was an adjunct professor at the University of California, Berkeley, School of Law (1966–1967) and the Graduate Theological Union (1966).

Pike with Martin Luther King Jr. at a press conference after the march to Selma, Alabama

His episcopate was marked by both professional and personal controversy. He was one of the leaders of the Protestants and Other Americans United for the Separation of Church and State movement, which advocated against John F. Kennedy's presidential campaign because of Catholic teachings. While at Grace Cathedral, he was involved with promoting a living wage for workers in San Francisco, the acceptance of LGBT people in the church, and civil rights. He also recognized a Methodist minister as having dual ordination and freedom to serve in the diocese. Later, he ordained a woman as a first-order deacon, now known as a "transitional deacon," usually the first step in the process towards ordination in the priesthood in the Episcopal church. The ordination was not approved until after Pike's death.

In 1962 Pike was a member of a fundraising committee organized by the Cuban Families Committee for Liberation of Prisoners of War, which sought to raise money to pay the ransom set by Fidel Castro for the release of those taken captive as a result of the Bay of Pigs Invasion. He also joined the Citizens Committee for a Free Cuba, set up in 1963.

Among his notable accomplishments, Pike invited Martin Luther King Jr. to speak at Grace Cathedral in San Francisco in 1965 following his march to Selma, Alabama.

Pike's theology involved the rejection of central Christian beliefs. His writings questioned a number of widely accepted tenets, including the virginity of Mary, the Mother of Jesus; the doctrine of Hell, and the Trinity. He famously called for "fewer beliefs, more belief." Heresy procedures were begun by a small group of bishops headed by the Bishop of South Florida, Henry I. Louttit, in 1962, 1964, 1965, and 1966, each growing in intensity. The Episcopal House of Bishops, realizing the damage that a public trial of a prelate of Pike's standing would do to the image of the Church, attempted to head off further proceedings in 1966 with a hastily conceived censure motion designed to satisfy his accusers, denouncing Pike's conduct and doctrinal statements: "His writing and speaking on profound realities with which Christian faith and worship are concerned are too often marred by caricatures of treasured symbols and at the worst, by cheap vulgarizations of great expressions of the faith." Pike, however, found the censure so abhorrent that he demanded the trial "to clear my name."

Attempting to avoid what would be a demoralizing proceeding, the Episcopal Convention got Pike to agree to drop his demands in exchange for their passing a canon that made it harder to bring official charges of heresy accusations, and to institute special provisions for "due process" in any future censures. While Pike's previous censure was not invalidated, the fact that he had been denied a formal hearing cast a "shadow of irresponsibility" on that action. The result was that the House of Bishops agreed to make the term "heresy" obsolete, with censure only being levied for "acts" and not for "opinion or teaching." The Convention also created an advisory committee on "theological freedom," which included Pike and other prominent theologians.

== The Other Side ==
In 1966, after they had shared a sabbatical study at Cambridge University, Pike's son, Jim Jr., fatally shot himself in a New York City hotel room. Shortly after his son's death, Pike reported experiencing poltergeist phenomena — books vanishing and reappearing, safety pins open and indicating the approximate hour of his son's death, half the clothes in a closet disarranged and heaped up. Pike led a public pursuit of various spiritualist and clairvoyant methods of contacting his deceased son to reconcile. In September 1967, Pike participated in a televised séance with his dead son through the medium Arthur Ford, an ordained minister in the Disciples of Christ church. Pike detailed these experiences in his book The Other Side.

== Personal life and death ==
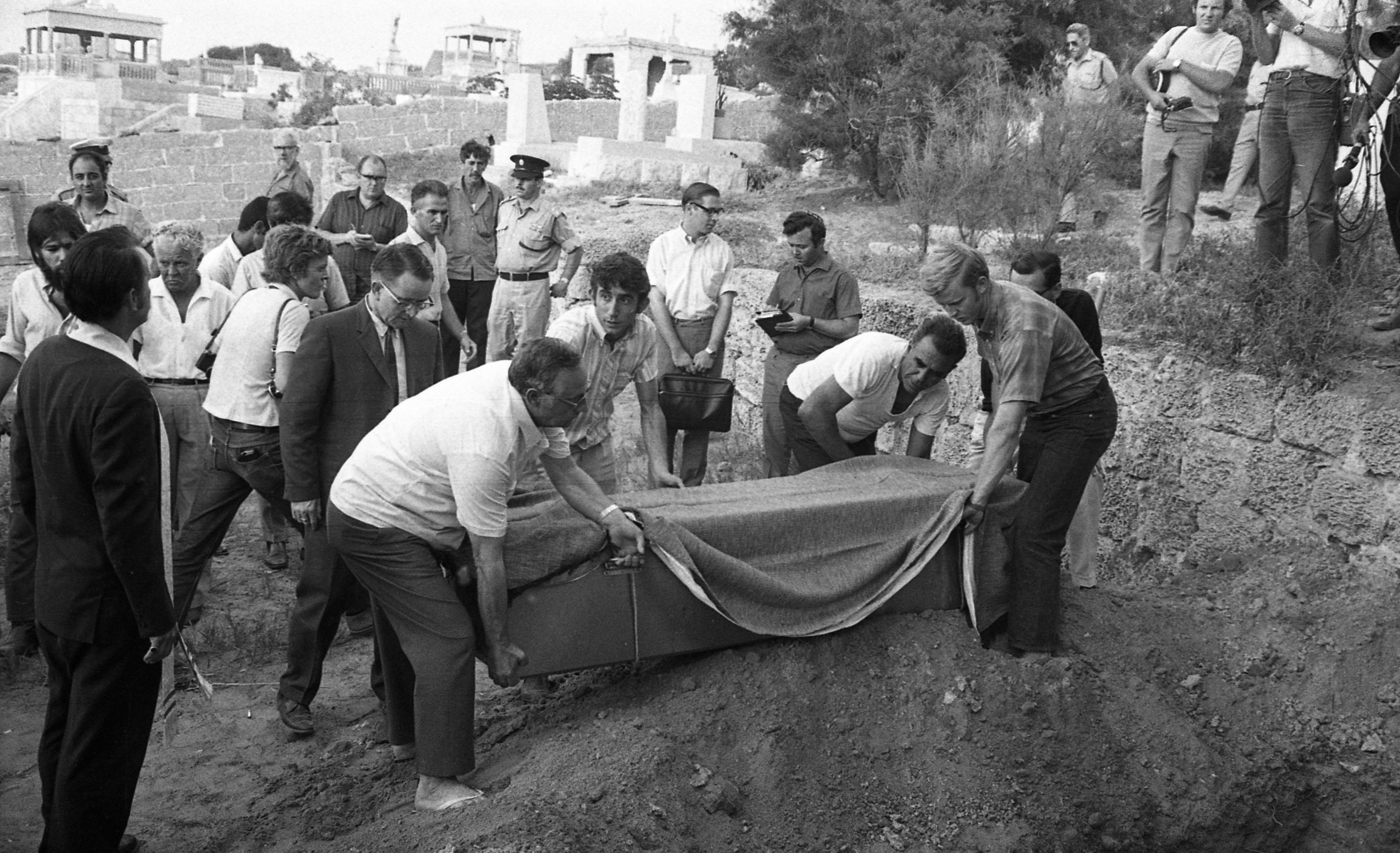
Pike's funeral, 1969, Jaffa Protestant cemetery

Pike's first marriage to Jane Alvies had ended in divorce in 1941, although Pike claimed it had been annulled. He then had married Esther Yanovsky in 1942; they had four children, two boys and two girls. Before his second wife filed for divorce in 1965, Pike had been living openly with his secretary, Maren Hackett Bergrud, until her suicide in 1967 at age 43, after she had taken an overdose of sleeping pills in his apartment after they had had an argument. Pike officiated at her funeral.

In 1968, in defiance of C. Kilmer Myers, the Bishop who succeeded him, he married Diane Kennedy, a Methodist student twenty-five years his junior, with whom he had collaborated on The Other Side. Diane Pike claimed Pike had only legally separated from, not divorced, his second wife in 1967, and that because his marriage was spiritually dead, Myers not only gave permission for the marriage, but agreed to officiate–then mysteriously reneged, while still upholding his judgment on their marriage. Three days after the wedding, Pike was barred from all priestly functions, including preaching, in Episcopal churches, presumably because he'd married without the approval of the Episcopal diocesan. The couple considered that their options were to demand a trial, which they claimed would have a biased outcome, or leave the church. In April 1969, they established the Foundation for Religious Transition (renamed the Bishop Pike Foundation after his death), formalizing a ministry to aid people who "found themselves on the edge of institutional Christianity." Pike formally announced he was leaving the Episcopal church, stating: "The poor may inherit the earth, but it would appear that the rich — or at least the rigid, respectable and safe — will inherit the church."

In August 1969, Pike and Diane traveled to Israel, to do research for a proposed book on the historical Jesus. Wanting to have a feeling for the landscape where Jesus went into the wilderness to fast and meditate for 40 days, on September 2 they drove into the Judean Desert outside of Jerusalem, planning to drive to Qumran, where the Dead Sea Scrolls had been discovered. Despite Pike having visited Israel before, they were unprepared for what they assumed would be a short drive, buying only two Cokes along the way and taking no water or a guide with them. Using an Avis map they'd been given at the airport with their rented Ford Cortina, they took several wrong turns before their vehicle became stuck in a deep rut on a tertiary dirt road. The Pikes vainly attempted to use the car's jack to free it, believing it was missing its base (it was a one-piece European model they were unfamiliar with). After an hour of stressful efforts to get the car to move, they decided to walk what they thought was north toward Qumran, where they knew there would be water. What they did not know was that they were far south of Qumran, and heading farther south into Wadi Mashash (Hebrew names: Wadi Dargot or מצוקי דרגות - Metsoke Dargot/Dragot, which translates to 'steep cliffs'). After two hours of walking in the tremendous heat, and with night approaching, a dehydrated and exhausted Pike could go no farther, and they found a relatively flat rock under a bit of an overhang that gave them some shade. Diane was concerned that if she lay down to die with him and their bodies were found together, it might be assumed their death was a suicide, whereas if her body were discovered partway to Qumran it would be obvious she had attempted to get help.

After ten long hours of climbing on the walls of the canyon and stumbling upon a road under construction (now the road to Mitzpe Shalem), she came to a camp of Arab laborers. They gave her tea to drink until the foreman came and took her to the nearest army camp, but the search for Pike did not start until well into that day. The news that Bishop Pike was reported missing in the Judean Desert was immediately given front page coverage in the New York Times. Diane Pike, in spite of her exhaustion and injuries, participated in the rescue attempt. While their car was soon found, there was no sign of her husband. As the number of search efforts began to dwindle on the third day, she relied on many mediums and seers, including the one who had worked with Pike in trying to contact his son, who offered visions of where her husband's body might be.

After five days, Pike's body was found on September 7, 1969, south of the route his wife had taken. He had found a large pool of water in a shaded area of the canyon bed, but instead of remaining there, continued to follow what he thought was his wife's route, leaving a trail of a map, undershorts, sunglasses, and her contact lens case, to indicate the path he had taken. Pike was apparently climbing a steep canyon wall in Wadi Mashash when he slipped and fell more than 60 feet to his death. The date of death on the burial certificate is "(?) September 2, 1969"; some sources cite it as between September 3 and 7. He was buried in the Protestant cemetery in Jaffa, Israel, on September 8, 1969.

== In literature ==
Bishop Pike was an inspiration for the character of Timothy Archer in Philip K. Dick's novel The Transmigration of Timothy Archer. Dick and Pike were friends; Pike had officiated at Dick's 1966 wedding to Nancy Hackett, Maren Hackett Bergrud's stepdaughter.

He is likewise mentioned several times in Dick's alternate history novel Radio Free Albemuth as one victim of a series of assassinations of prominent citizens orchestrated to clear the way for the book's villain to assume the US Presidency.

Joan Didion wrote about Pike and the building of the Grace Cathedral in her collection of essays The White Album (1979).

E. L. Doctorow's 2000 novel City of God features Pike as a mentor to his fictional character, Reverend Dr. Thomas Pemberton. In a prayer, Pemberton reveals the story of his search to escape ritualization and find illumination in the wilds of Africa, in the same way that Pike ventured into the wilderness around Jerusalem in an attempt to connect with the historical Jesus.

== Major works ==
- Beyond Anxiety: The Christian Answer to Fear, Frustration, Guilt, Indecision, Inhibition, Loneliness, Despair. New York City: Charles Scribner's Sons. 1953. OCLC 1244471532.
- With Pittenger, W. Norman (1959). The Faith of the Church. Greenwich, Connecticut: Seabury Press. OCLC 222934908.
- If You Marry Outside Your Faith: Counsel on Mixed Marriage. New York City: Harper & Brothers. 1954. OCLC 504003756.
- With Krumm, John M. (1954). Roadblocks to Faith. New York City: Morehouse-Gorham Co. OCLC 1237563.
- Doing the Truth. Garden City, New York: Doubleday & Co. 1955. OCLC 1154386611.
- With Pyle, John W. (1955). The Church, Politics, and Society. New York City: Morehouse-Gorham Co. OCLC 1060515.
- With Johnson, Howard A. (1956). Man in the Middle. Greenwich, Connecticut: Seabury Press. OCLC 3026008.
- ————, ed. (1956). Modern Canterbury Pilgrims. New York City: Morehouse-Gorham. LCCN 56006116.
- The Next Day. Garden City, New York: Doubleday & Co. 1957. LCCN 57008302.
  - Also published as Facing the Next Day. New York City: MacMillan Inc. 1968. LCCN 68028294. OCLC 448888.
- With Byfield, Richard (1960). A Roman Catholic in the White House. Garden City, New York: Doubleday & Co. OCLC 504003779.
- A New Look at Preaching. New York City: Charles Scribner's Sons. 1961. OCLC 1016364045.
- Our Christmas Challenge. New York City: Sterling. 1961. OCLC 2485609.
- Beyond the Law. Garden City, New York: Doubleday & Co. 1963. OCLC 1114350910.
- A Time for Christian Candor. New York City: Harper & Row. 1964. OCLC 500434957.
- Teen-Agers and Sex. Englewood Cliffs, New Jersey: Prentice Hall. 1965. OCLC 936939179.
- What is This Treasure. New York City: Harper & Rowe. 1966. OCLC 414486.
- If This Be Heresy. New York City: Harper & Row. 1967. OCLC 1213774.
- You and the New Morality. New York City: Harper & Row. 1967. OCLC 1089624039.
- With Kennedy, Diane (1968). The Other Side. Garden City, New York: Doubleday & Co. LCCN 68029044.
