= Fran Toy =

Asian American Episcopal Priest (1934–2024)

Fran Toy (August 9, 1934 – December 28, 2024) was an American Christian priest, and the first Asian American woman to be ordained in the Episcopal Church. Toy became the first female warden at the Episcopal Church of Our Savior Church, Oakland in 1974. Toy was also the first female cleric to be elected as a deputy to General Convention from the Diocese of California 1988. Additionally, she was the first deployment officer employed in an Episcopal seminary to serve on the national church's deployment board from 1994 to 2000.

== Early life and education ==
Toy grew up in Oakland's Chinatown, California, where she also grew up going to the Church of Our Savior, a Chinese congregation in Oakland. She and her family were part of the working class as they lived in Wilma Chan Park, formerly Madison Square Park. Toy's mother was the first woman to open up a school in Chinatown. Her childhood home was destroyed by urban renewal due to the arrival of Bay Area Rapid Transit.

Toy graduated from the University of California, Berkeley in 1956. In 1984, she graduated from the Church Divinity School of the Pacific (CDSP) with a Master of Divinity.

== Career ==
Following in her mother's footsteps, Toy began her career as an educator, teaching in an elementary school in Oakland, California, for 18 years.

Toy became the first female warden at the Episcopal Church of Our Savior Church, Oakland in 1974. In 1987, Toy was a member of the Committee of the Full Participation of Women. She is the first female cleric to be elected as a deputy to General Convention from the Diocese of California 1988. She is also the first deployment officer employed in an Episcopal seminary to serve on the national church's deployment board from 1994 to 2000.

On June 6, 2008, Toy spoke at the opening of the Episcopal Asiamerica Ministries Consultation in Kaoshiung, Taiwan. There, she gave a welcoming and thanksgiving to the host Diocese of Taiwan. Fran Toy died on December 28, 2024, at the age of 90.

== See also ==
- Ordination of women in the Anglican Communion
