= C. Kilmer Myers =

American priest

The Right Reverend Chauncey Kilmer Myers L.H.D
- Bishop of California
- Church: Episcopal Church
- Diocese: California
- Elected: September 14, 1966
- In office: 1967–1979
- Predecessor: James Pike
- Successor: William E. Swing
- Previous post: Suffragan Bishop of Michigan (1964-1967)

Orders
- Ordination: May 27, 1940 (deacon); December 21, 1940 (priest) by G. Ashton Oldham
- Consecration: September 29, 1964 by John Pares Craine

Personal details
- Born: February 14, 1916 Schuylerville, New York, United States
- Died: June 27, 1981 (aged 65) San Francisco, California, United States
- Denomination: Anglican (prev.Reformed tradition)
- Parents: Harry Edward Myers & Addie Beatrice Greene
- Spouse: Katie Lea Stewart (m. 1958)
- Children: 3
- Education: Rutgers University

Chauncey (also Chauncie) Kilmer (Kim) Myers (February 14, 1916 – June 27, 1981) was bishop of the Diocese of California in the Episcopal Church from 1967 to 1979.

== Early life and education ==
Myers was born on February 14, 1916, in Schuylerville, New York, to Harry Edward Myers and Addie Beatrice Greene. He grew up in the Reformed tradition. He graduated with a B.A. in sociology from Rutgers University in 1937. He studied at Berkeley Divinity School and gained his Bachelor of Sacred Theology and Doctor of Sacred Theology in 1940. He was also awarded with an honorary Doctor of Humane Letters degree by Rutgers University in 1962.

== Priest ==
He was ordained a deacon on May 27, 1940, and a priest on December 21 of the same year. He taught church history at Berkeley, first as a resident fellow and then as an instructor between 1940 and 1943. In 1943 he became rector of St Mark's Church in Buffalo, New York, and in 1944 became a chaplain in the United States Navy, a post he held till 1946. In 1946 he became an instructor at the General Theological Seminary, and in 1949 became a lecturer in pastoral theology at the same seminary. Myers was appointed vicar of St Augustine and Christ Church in New York, part of the then Trinity parish, and served in this post from 1952 till 1960. Later he was appointed as vicar of the Church of the Intercession in New York. In 1963 he became the first director of the Urban Training Center for Christian Mission in Chicago.

== Suffragan of Michigan ==
In 1964 Myers was elected Suffragan Bishop of Michigan. He was consecrated bishop on September 29, 1964 in St Paul's Cathedral in Detroit by John Pares Craine, Bishop of Indianapolis who was acting for Presiding Bishop Lichtenberger. The co-consecrators were the Bishop of Michigan Richard S. M. Emrich and Archie H. Crowley, Suffragan Bishop of Michigan.

== Bishop of California ==
On September 14, 1966, Myers was elected as Bishop of California, succeeding Bishop James Pike and became diocesan bishop on January 14, 1967. As Bishop of California, Myers made headlines numerous times, notably due to his criticism of the Vietnam War, fight against racism and corruption within the government. He even denounced the views of Cardinal Spellman of New York on the Vietnam War as outrageous. He led the diocese in dealing with fiscal challenges, selling the bishop's mansion as a budgetary measure. He also voiced his opposition to the ordination of women; however, he voted in favor in the 1976 General Convention which consequently approved the ordination of women. In 1967, he raised some controversy when he stated that Christian unity could be achieved if all Christians recognized the pope as their spiritual leader. However, his views changed a few years later when he criticized the pope for his opposition on birth control. He retired on December 31, 1979, for health reasons. Myers was also in favor of ministering to homosexual people as he himself stated in the report of the Theological Committee at the House of Bishops meeting in Port St. Lucie, Florida, in 1977. He moved to Healdsburg, California, after his retirement.

== Personal life ==
Myers married Katie Lea Stewart, and together they adopted three children. Myers died on June 27, 1981 at the University of California Hospital in San Francisco after a week-long hospitalization.
