= California State Prison, Solano =

Male-only state prison in Vacaville, California

California State Prison, Solano (SOL)
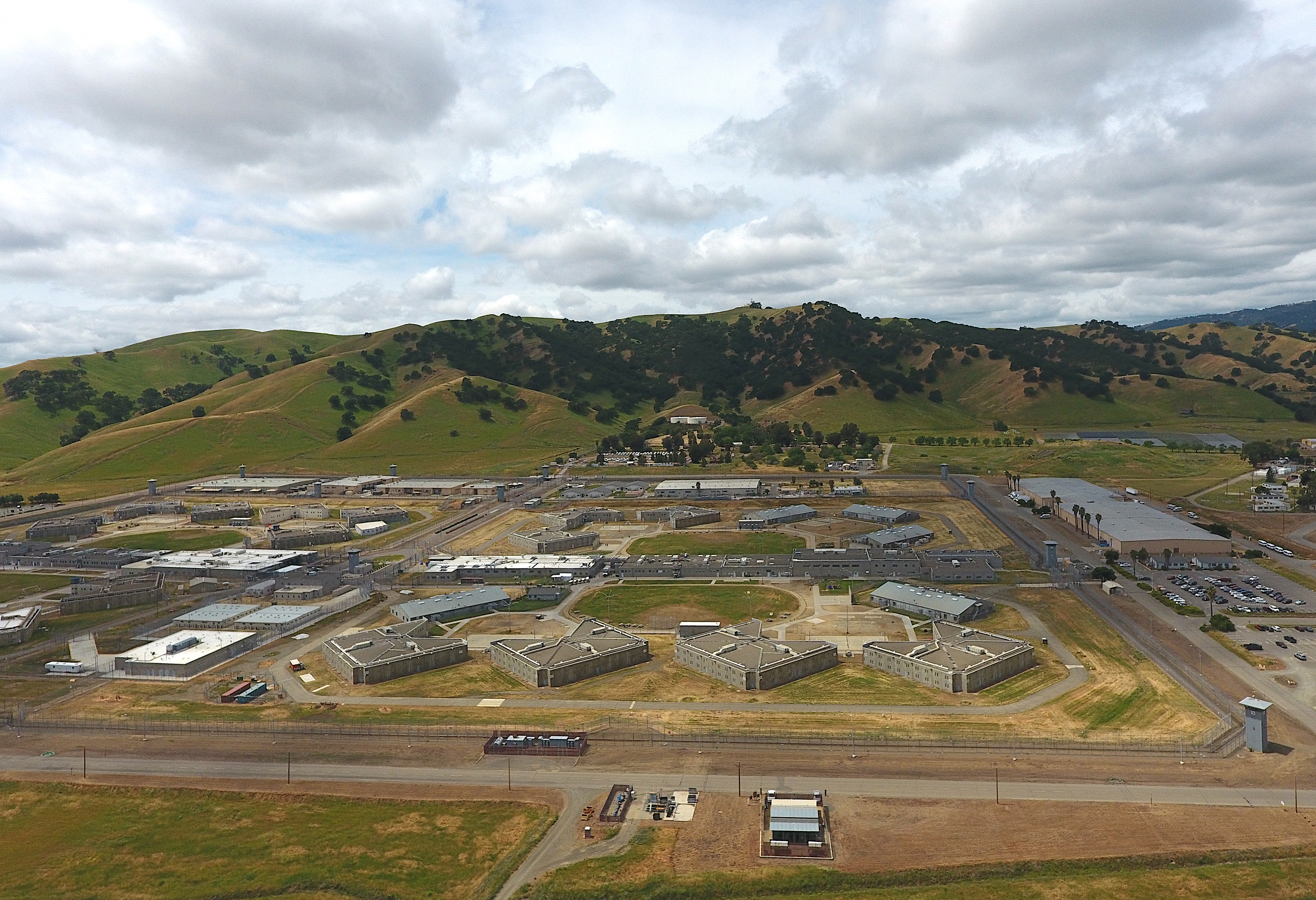
- Interactive map of California State Prison, Solano (SOL)
- Location: Vacaville, California; 38.322°N 121.975°W
- Status: Operational
- Security class: Medium
- Capacity: 2,594
- Population: 3,326 (128.2% capacity) (January 31, 2023)
- Opened: August 1984
- Managed by: California Department of Corrections and Rehabilitation
- Warden: Robert Neuschmid

California State Prison, Solano (SOL) is a male-only state prison located in the city of Vacaville in Solano County, California, adjacent to California Medical Facility. The facility is also referenced as Solano State Prison, CSP-Solano, and CSP-SOL.

== Facilities ==
Solano State Prison
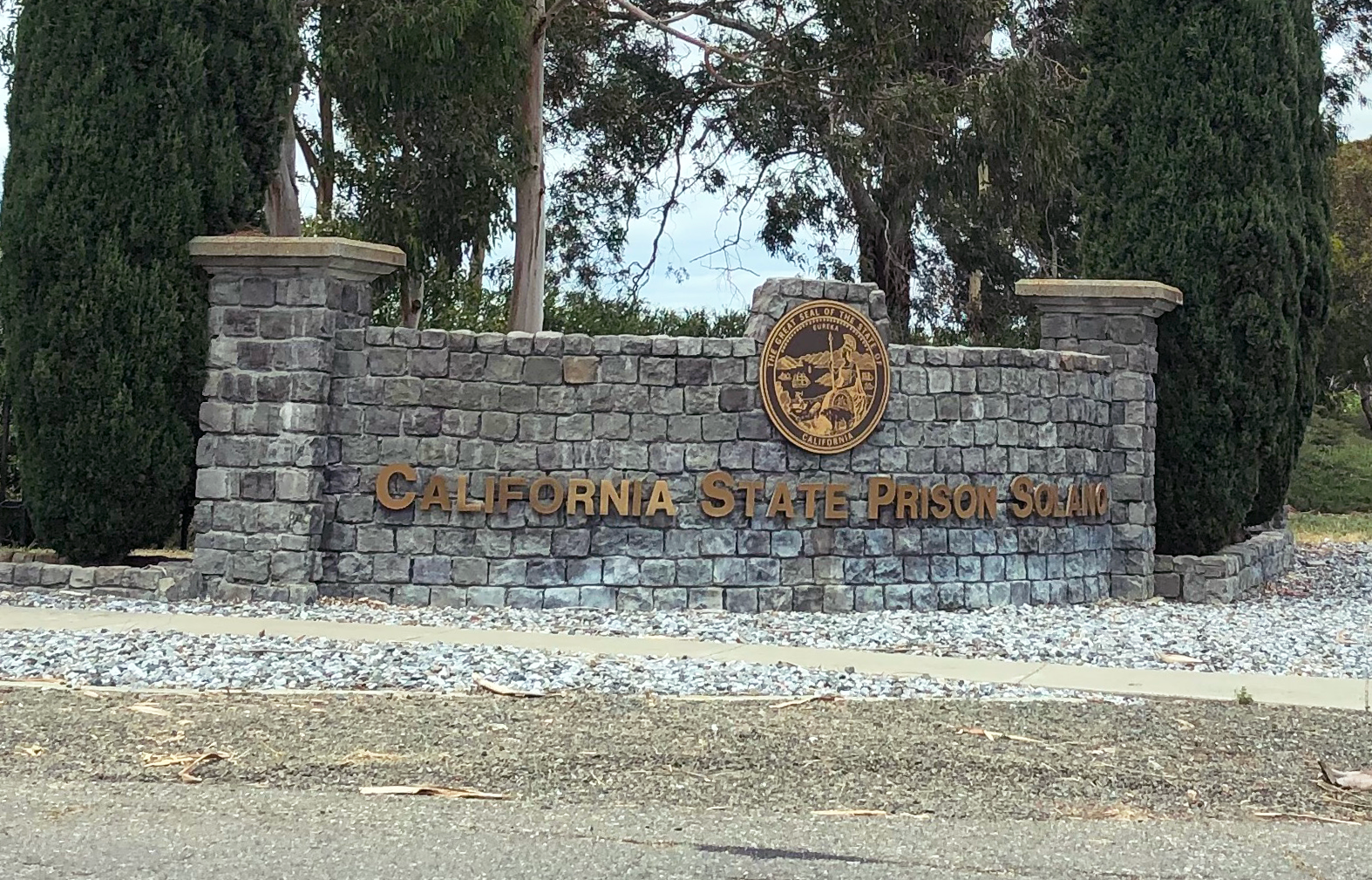
Prison sign with California state seal

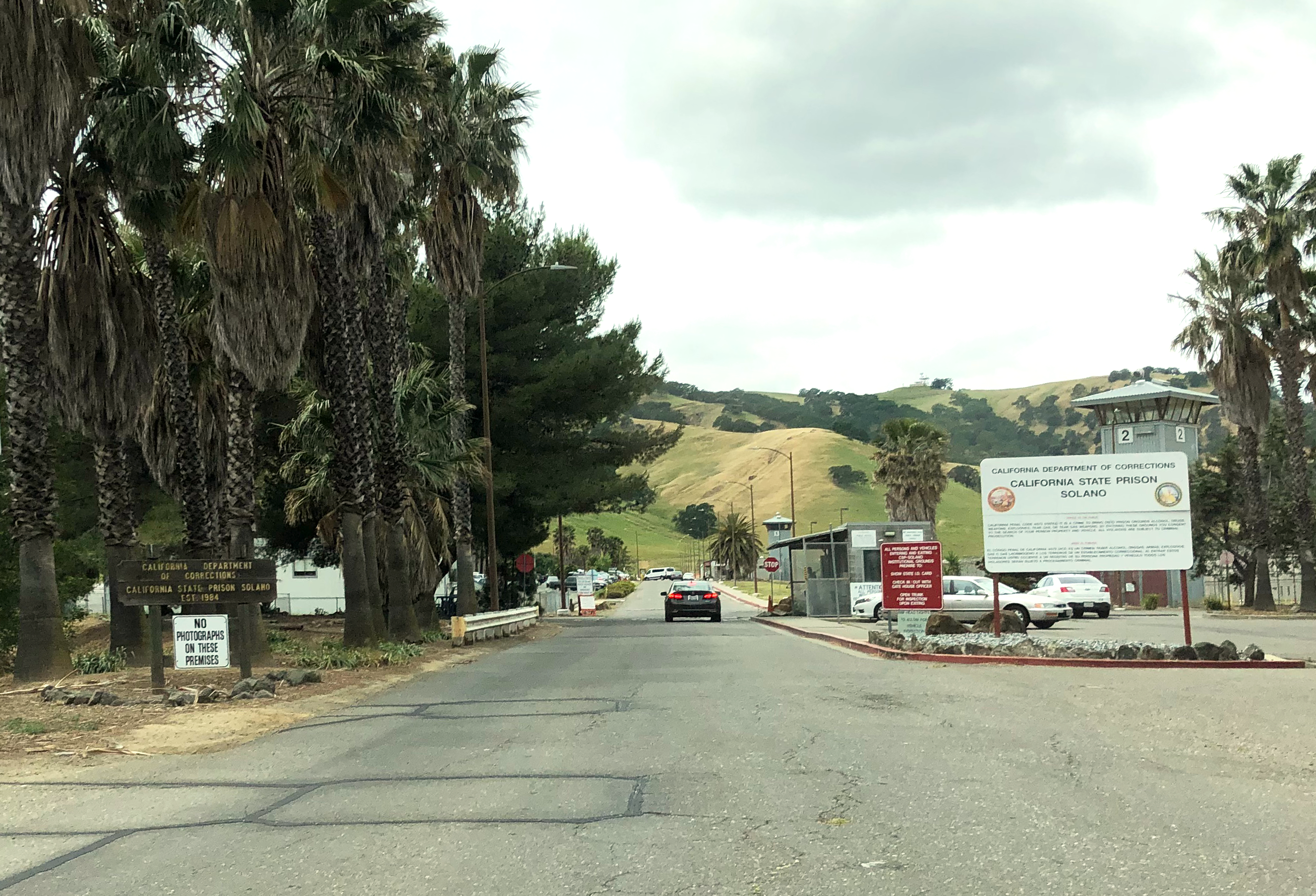
Entrance to Solano State Prison

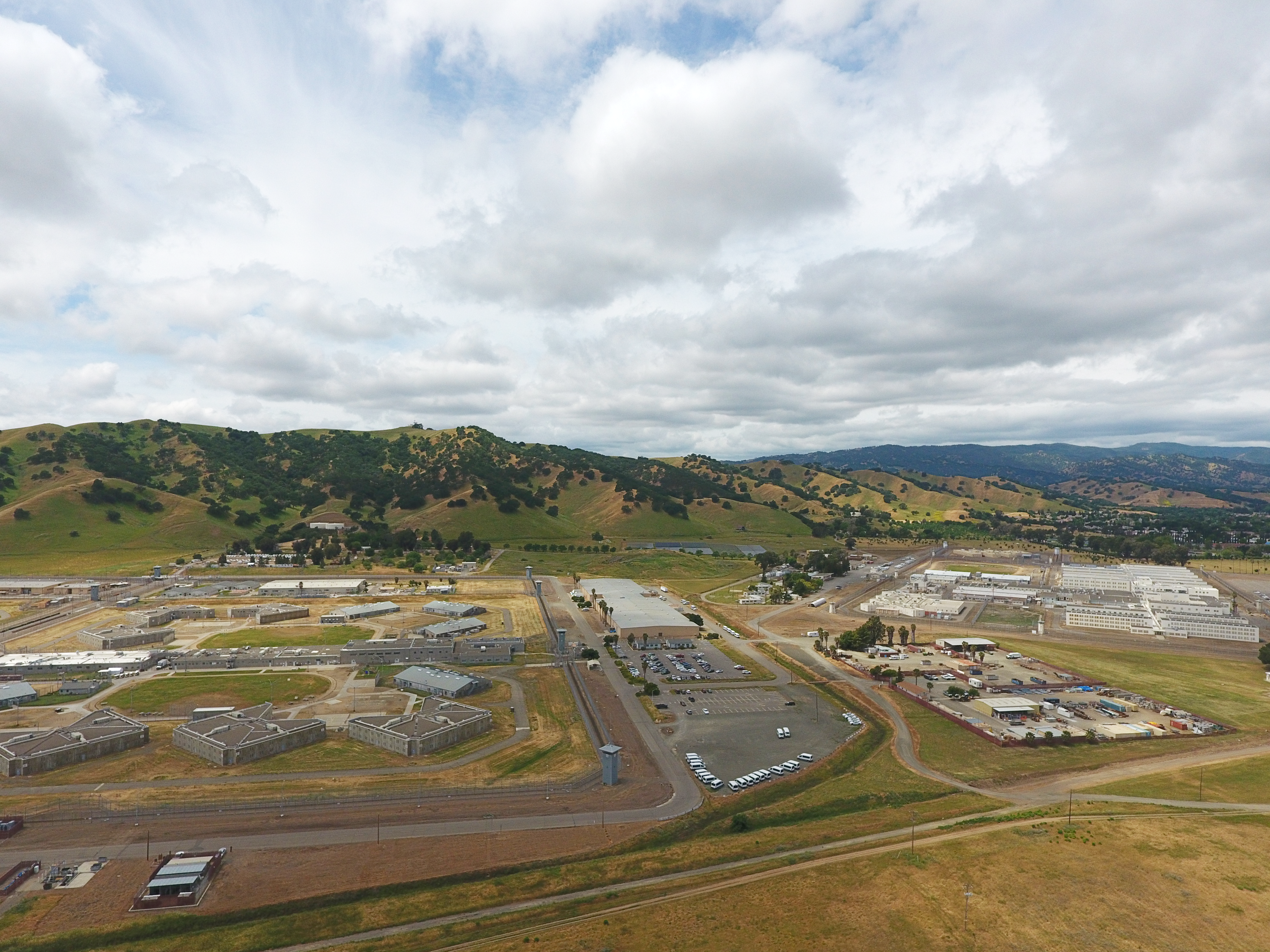
Aerial view of Solano State Prison (left) with California Medical Facility in the background (right)

SOL's 146 acres (59 ha) include the following facilities, among others:

- Level II housing: Open dormitories with secure perimeter fences and armed coverage
- Level III housing: Individual cells, fenced perimeters and armed coverage

== Population and staff ==
As of fiscal year 2006/2007, SOL had a total of 1,308 staff and an annual operating budget of $158.4 million. As of February 2011, it had a design capacity of 2,610 but a total institution population of 5,050, for an occupancy rate of 193.5 percent.

As of July 31, 2022, SOL was incarcerating people at 124.7% of its design capacity, with 3,255 occupants.

== History ==
Location of Vacaville within Solano County, and location of Solano County within California

The California State Prison at Solano opened in August 1984. SOL was overseen by the warden of California Medical Facility until January 1992, when a separate warden was assigned. By 1998, SOL was so crowded that "emergency triple bunks" were added. In 2008/2009 triple bunking was removed and the gyms by August 2009 were not holding inmates.

A 2001 U.S. District Court ruling and a 2002 U.S. Court of Appeals decision supported the "right of Muslim inmates" at SOL "to attend regular weekly religious services and wear beards in accordance with their faith".

== Notable inmates (current or former) ==
| Inmate Name | Register Number | Status | Details |
|---|---|---|---|
| Larry Craig Green | B72252 | Serving a life sentence; denied parole multiple times. | One of the members of the Death Angels who committed the Zebra murders. |
| Loi Khac Nguyen | J69791 | Serving 41 life sentences without parole. | One of 4 perpetrators of the 1991 Sacramento hostage crisis in which dozens of people were taken hostage (3 of which would be murdered) and Loi was the only one of the culprits who survived a police rescue operation. |

- William Ray Bonner (born 1948), spree killer
- Anthony Jacques Broussard (born c. 1965), murderer of Marcy Renee Conrad
- Spoon Jackson (born 1957), poet
- Sanyika Shakur (1963–2021), gang member; was interviewed at SOL; paroled
- Johnny Spain (born 1949), member of the San Quentin Six; paroled in 1988
- James Tramel (c. 1967), Episcopal priest convicted of murder; was paroled by Arnold Schwarzenegger in 2006
- Anthony Wimberly (born 1962), serial killer; sentenced to three years for burglary and robbery; paroled in 1983. Currently at Mule Creek State Prison.
- Jarad Nava, from They Call Us Monsters paroled in 2020
