= Anthony Wimberly =

American criminal and serial killer

- Born: Anthony Rene Lee; October 26, 1962 (age 63); Antioch, California, U.S.
- Convictions: First degree murder with special circumstances x3 Attempted murder x2 Burglary x4 Robbery x5 Felon in possession of a gun x4 Rape
- Penalty: Life sentence without the possibility of parole

Details
- Victims: 3
- Span of crimes: 1984–1985
- Country: United States
- State: California
- Date apprehended: February 5, 1985
- Imprisoned at: Mule Creek State Prison, Ione, California

Anthony Rene Wimberly (né Lee; born October 26, 1962) is an American criminal and serial killer. Between December 1984 and January 1985, he murdered three women in Oakland for the purpose of robbery, as well as raping a 12-year-old girl. After his arrest, he confessed to his crimes and was later given three life sentences.

== Early life and crimes ==
Wimberly was born as Anthony Rene Lee on October 26, 1962, to Ray Lee, an employee for the Pacific Gas and Electric Company from Antioch, and Gwendolyn Williams, who was jobless and on welfare. A year after his birth, his mother married to A.D. Wimberly from Oakland, but the couple divorced when Anthony was little. His mother then moved away so she could work at nursing homes in Tacoma, Washington and Minnesota, returning to Oakland when he was nine years old.

In 1976, at age 14, Wimberly was arrested for assault and taken to a group home in Oroville, where he would spend the next nine months. After release, he was arrested for robbery and sent off to the CYA's closed facility in Stockton, where he spent another 11 months. Anthony was paroled in 1978, but was returned only six months later for burglary, and again paroled on January 23, 1980. He then attended Castlemont High School in East Oakland, but passed only two of his classes. On November 4, the now-adult Wimberly broke into an East Oakland home and tied up a 12-year-old boy while he was ransacking the premises. He found a shotgun, but was spooked off when the boy's mother returned home. He was captured soon after, but bailed out after his arrest.

Wimberly then registered at an adult day school in the city, but never attended a class. When questioned by his parole officers, he claimed to have worked for a few months installing air fitters for a company in San Francisco, but those claims couldn't be confirmed. On June 12, 1981, he broke into a garage and stole a brand new Lincoln Continental, with which he was caught five days later while burglarizing a home. He pled guilty to robbery and burglary, and was sentenced to a 3-year imprisonment term at Solano State Prison in Vacaville, where he was sent to on September 2. He was paroled on May 28, 1983, but was thrown into San Quentin State Prison in September for grand theft auto and violating the conditions of his parole. On September 3, 1984, he was released on parole yet again and moved in to live with his mother in the Acorn Projects.

== Murders ==
Not long after his final release, Wimberly embarked on a crime spree in Oakland, beginning with the November 8th rape and shooting of a 12-year-old girl in the west side. More than a month later, on December 23, he broke into the home of 24-year-old secretary Anna Arevalo, raping and then shooting her multiple times. Wimberly then stuffed her corpse in a closet, before ransacking the house and then fleeing, leaving Arevalo's twin baby daughters crying, but unharmed, in the adjacent room.

On January 24 the following year, Wimberly entered a beauty parlor in West Oakland, demanding money from the two employees present: Vicky J. Russo, from Concord, and Marilyn A. Moore, both 35. When they told him that there was none, Anthony shot both women multiple times, killing Moore and heavily injuring Russo. He then stole the keys to Vicky's van and fled the area. The shooting was quickly reported to police by alarmed residents, with the authorities later finding Russo barely alive in a pool of blood before rushing her to a hospital. About 45 minutes after the shooting, the van was spotted along Adeline Street in West Oakland. The driver pulled into a parking lot and fled on foot, with the officers and a helicopter with a spotlight hard on his heels. Despite the circumstances, Wimberly managed to hide himself in the Acorn Projects. On January 31, he broke into the Oakland Hills home of 62-year-old Doris Wong Lee, killing her while trying to burgle the house.

== Arrest, trial and imprisonment ==
Six days after killing Lee, Wimberly was arrested and charged with the three murders and the rape of the 12-year-old, as well as 16 other felonies, after police found evidence linking him to the three killings. The drastic shift in his violence after his parole was compared with that of another dangerous murderer, Raymond George, who had been released only a few days after Wimberly, but had quieted down. Wimberly later confessed to killing Arevalo and Moore and the raping of the 12-year-old girl, but denied killing Lee, claiming that two other men had committed the murder and he had found her dead when he broke into the home. Regardless of his claims, he was later found guilty of all charges and given three life imprisonment terms.

== See also ==
- List of serial killers in the United States
