= Edward L. Parsons =

American bishop

The Right Reverend Edward Lambe Parsons D.D.
- Bishop of California
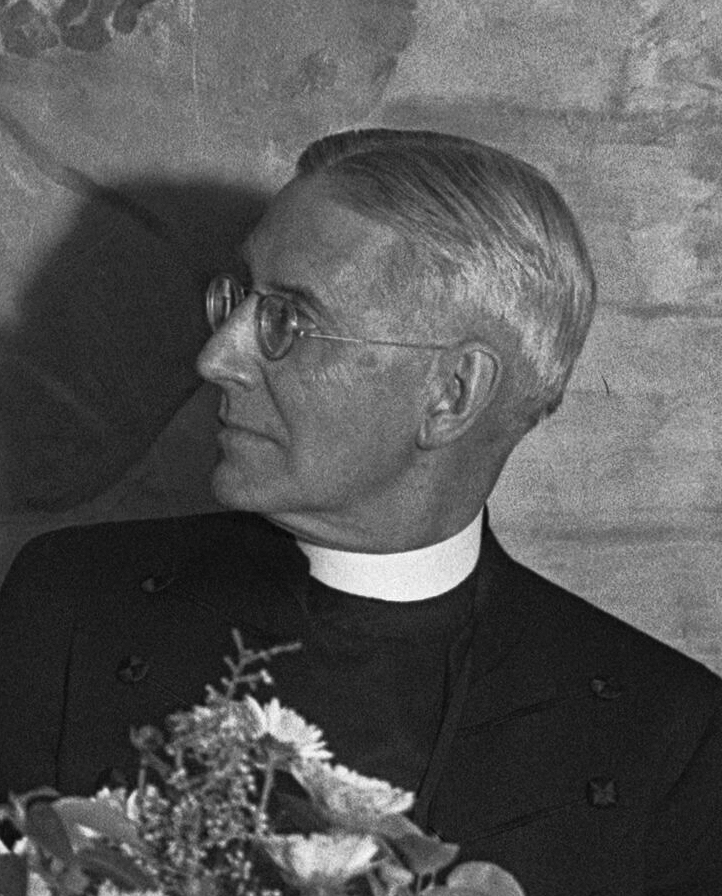
- Parsons in 1935
- Church: Episcopal Church
- Diocese: California
- Elected: 1919
- In office: 1924–1940
- Predecessor: William Ford Nichols
- Successor: Karl M. Block
- Previous post: Coadjutor Bishop of California (1919-1924)

Orders
- Ordination: June 9, 1895 by Henry C. Potter
- Consecration: November 5, 1919 by William Ford Nichols

Personal details
- Born: May 18, 1868 New York City, New York, United States
- Died: July 19, 1960 (aged 92) San Francisco, California, United States
- Buried: Grace Cathedral, San Francisco
- Denomination: Anglican (prev. Presbyterian)
- Parents: Arthur Wellesley & Helen Clement White
- Spouse: Bertha de Forest Brush (m. 1897; died 1935)
- Children: 4
- Education: Yale University

Edward Lambe Parsons (May 18, 1868 – July 19, 1960) was the third bishop of the Episcopal Diocese of California.

== Early life and education ==
Born on May 18, 1868, in New York City to Arthur Wellesley parsons and Helen Clement White, Parsons was raised as a Presbyterian. He was educated at Yale College from where he completed his Bachelor of Arts in 1889 with the intention of becoming a lawyer. However, he attended the Union Theological Seminary to undertake theological studies from where he graduated in 1892. Despite his studies he was application to become a Presbyterian minister was rejected. This led to his consultations with Bishop William Lawrence which eventually led him to join the Episcopal Church and study at the Episcopal Theological School, from where he graduated in 1894.

== Ordained ministry ==
He was ordained to the diaconate on December 23, 1894, by Bishop William Lawrence of Massachusetts, and to the priesthood on June 9, 1895, by Bishop Henry C. Potter of New York. He was initially assistant at Grace Church in New York City from 1894 to 1895. In 1896 he moved to California to serve as rector of Trinity Church in Menlo Park, California. Between 1900 and 1904 he was rector of St Matthew's Church in San Mateo, California, while in 1904 he became rector of St Mark's Church in Berkeley, California, where he remained until 1919.

== Episcopacy ==
Parsons was elected on the third ballot to be coadjutor bishop of the Diocese of California and was consecrated on November 5, 1919, by Bishop William Ford Nichols of California. He then succeeded as diocesan bishop on June 5, 1924, and remained in office until his retirement on December 31, 1940. After retiring from his position with the church, he joined the Northern California American Civil Liberties Union board of directors, serving as chairman from 1941 to 1956 and remaining on the board for the rest of his life.

He was a member of the University Club of San Francisco. He was an author of several books including The American Prayer Book: Its Origins and Principles (1937). He married Bertha de Forest Brush on May 18, 1897, and had four children. He died in San Francisco in 1960, at age 92.
