= Austin Rios =

American Episcopal bishop

The Right Reverend Austin Rios
- Ninth Bishop of California
- Church: The Episcopal Church
- Province: Province VIII
- Diocese: Episcopal Diocese of California
- Elected: December 2, 2023
- In office: 2024–present
- Predecessor: Marc Andrus
- Previous posts: Rector of St. Paul's Within the Walls, Rome, Italy; Rector of La Capilla de Santa Maria, Hendersonville, North Carolina; Canon for Spanish Speaking Ministries, Diocese of Western North Carolina

Orders
- Ordination: 2005
- Consecration: 2024
- Rank: Diocesan bishop

Personal details
- Born: Austin Keith Rios
- Denomination: Episcopalian
- Spouse: Maleah Rios
- Children: 1
- Education: Davidson College; Seminary of the Southwest

Austin Keith Rios is the ninth bishop of the Episcopal Diocese of California. He was elected bishop coadjutor on December 2, 2023, and was ordained and consecrated on May 4, 2024. Rios was formally installed as diocesan bishop at Grace Cathedral, the seat of the Episcopal Diocese of California, on August 11, 2024.

As bishop, Rios has articulated a diocesan vision centered on the theme “Rooted in Christ, bearing fruit for the healing of the world.” Drawing on the Gospel of John’s account of the resurrected Christ calling Peter to renewed ministry, he emphasizes spiritual renewal, communal discipleship, and service as the foundation of diocesan life. His vision calls for deeper grounding in Christian practice, strengthened relationships across congregations, and ministry oriented toward healing, meaning, and community in the San Francisco Bay Area and beyond.

In public communications, Rios has emphasized listening, trust-building, strengthening community life, shared responsibility, and unity as central to the church’s mission.

== Career ==
Rios is the first Latino to lead the Diocese of California. His father's family is Mexican American, and his mother's ancestry is Scottish and English. He speaks Spanish and Italian fluently.

Before his election, Rios served for 12 years as rector of St. Paul's Within the Walls Episcopal Church in Rome, Italy, which houses the Joel Nafuma Refugee Center. He previously served as rector of La Capilla de Santa Maria, a Spanish-speaking congregation in Hendersonville, North Carolina, while also working as canon for Spanish-speaking ministries in the Diocese of Western North Carolina.

He has served the Episcopal Church in various roles, including multiple terms as a deputy to the General Convention. In 2018, he was elected a trustee of the Church Pension Fund and later became vice chair of its investment committee. He was re-elected as a trustee and named vice chair of the fund in 2024.

== Personal life ==
Rios considers many places home, including Texas, where he was born; North Carolina, where he began his ministry; Rome, where he spent more than a decade in service; and now the San Francisco Bay Area. He earned a Bachelor of Arts from Davidson College, and a Master of Divinity from the Episcopal Theological Seminary of the Southwest.

== See also ==
- List of Episcopal bishops of the United States
- List of bishops of the Episcopal Church in the United States of America
