= Karl M. Block =

American Episcopal bishop (1886–1958)

The Right Reverend Karl Morgan Block D.D.
- Bishop of California
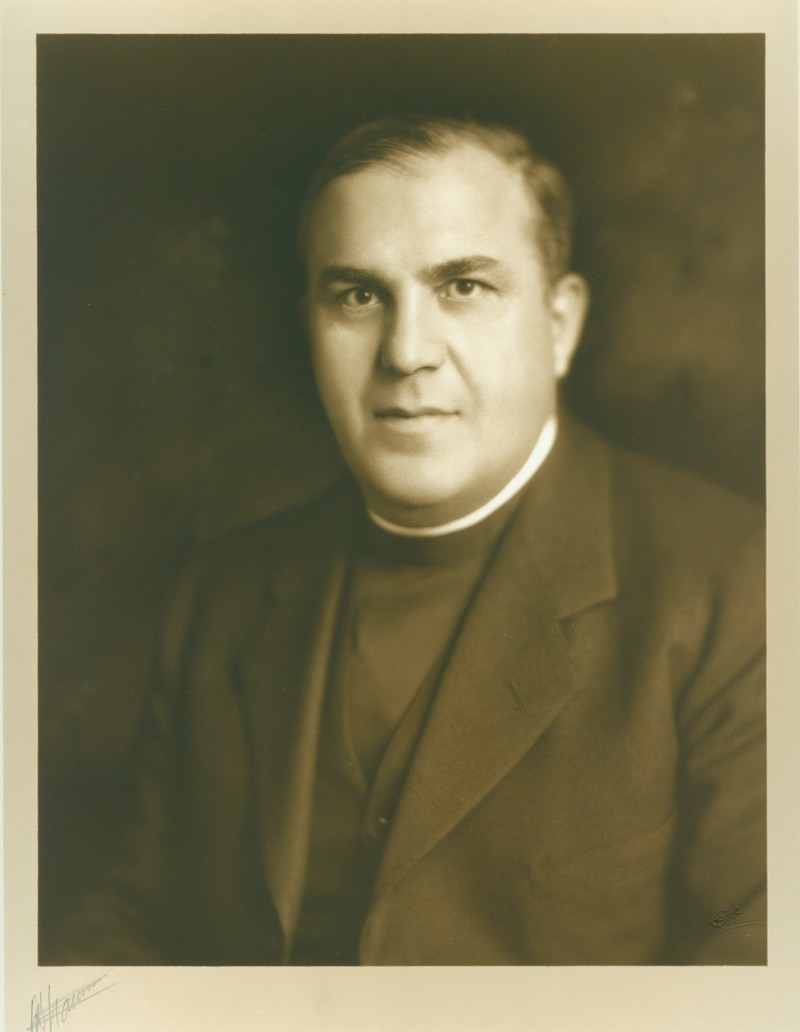
- Church: Episcopal Church
- Diocese: California
- Elected: April 19, 1938
- In office: 1941–1958
- Predecessor: Edward L. Parsons
- Successor: James Pike
- Previous post: Coadjutor Bishop of California (1938-1941)

Orders
- Ordination: May 22, 1910 (deacon); December 18, 1910 (priest) by Alfred Harding
- Consecration: September 29, 1938 by Edward L. Parsons

Personal details
- Born: September 27, 1886 Washington, D.C., United States
- Died: September 20, 1958 (aged 71) San Francisco, California, United States
- Buried: Cypress Lawn Memorial Park
- Denomination: Anglican
- Parents: Sigismund Joseph Block & Joanna Christine Linder
- Spouse: Nancy Holliday Shackelford (m. 1913; died 1945)
- Children: 2
- Education: George Washington University

Karl Morgan Block (September 27, 1886 – September 20, 1958) was the fourth bishop of the Episcopal Diocese of California.

== Early life and education ==
Block was born on September 27, 1886, in Washington, D.C., the son of Sigismund Joseph Block and Joanna Christine Linder. He earned a Bachelor of Arts from George Washington University in 1907, and later a Bachelor of Divinity from the Virginia Theological Seminary in 1910. He was awarded a number of honorary degrees; a Doctor of Divinity from Roanoke College in 1923, the University of the South in 1935, and the Virginia Theological Seminary in 1950, respectively; a Doctor of Laws from George Washington University in 1937; and a Doctor of Systematic Theology from the University of the Pacific in 1953.

== Ordained ministry ==
Ordained a deacon on May 22, 1910, and priest on December 18, 1910, by Bishop Alfred Harding of Washington, he initially served as chaplain at Woodberry Forest School between 1910 and 1913. Then in 1913 he accepted the post of rector of Grace Church in Haddonfield, New Jersey, where he remained until 1917. Between 1917 until 1918 he was a volunteer chaplain at Fort Dix. In 1918, he became rector of All Saints’ Church in Norristown, Pennsylvania, while in 1920 he moved to Roanoke, Virginia, to be rector of St John’s Church. In 1926, he became rector of the Church of St Michael and St George in St. Louis, a post he retained until 1938.

== Episcopacy ==
Block was elected Coadjutor Bishop of Kansas, however, he declined the election. On April 19, 1938, he was once more elected bishop, this time as Coadjutor Bishop of California and he accepted. He was consecrated as coadjutor bishop of California by Edward L. Parsons as primary consecrator and co-consecrated by Benjamin D. Dagwell on September 29, 1938, in Grace Cathedral, San Francisco. He succeeded as diocesan on January 1, 1941. During his tenure the diocese experienced an increase in clergy, increased income, and novel building projects. Block died in office on September 20, 1958.
