= Northwestern Preparatory School (California) =

Postsecondary school in California, United States

Coordinates: 34°14′12″N 117°19′14″W

Information
- Established: 1915; 111 years ago
- Website: www.northwesternprep.com

Northwestern Preparatory School (NWPS) is a post-high school graduate preparatory school designed to prepare young men and women who aspire to attend United States military academies. It focuses on improving students' standardized test taking skills through English, mathematics, science, and vocabulary study.

Founded in 1915 in Mound, Minnesota. James Hoiby served as Headmaster for over two decades. In 1982, NWPS relocated to Santa Barbara, California. It remained there for the next few years until again relocating to the San Bernardino Mountains. From 1988 to 1989, NWPS was located at Camp Cisquito (near Green Valley) in the heart of the Angeles National Forest. In 1990, NWPrep relocated to Malibu on the Pacific Coast Highway, leasing Camp Joan Mier from Ability First, formerly the Crippled Children Society. After the 1995 Malibu fire, NWPrep moved to another Ability First facility, Camp Paivika, in the San Bernardino Mountains, CA. Following James Hoiby's death, Mrs. Suzanne Durbeck was appointed Headmistress by members of the NWPS school board.

The school has been successful at achieving its stated goal of assisting students in earning an appointment to a Service Academy with over 2,000 placements at the United States Air Force Academy, the United States Coast Guard Academy, the United States Military Academy, West Point, the United States Naval Academy, and the United States Merchant Marine Academy, Kings Point.

== Life at NWPS ==
Students are expected to remember 20 selected vocabulary words each day and test in the morning (Except Sundays) The students also run every day, have 1 hour and 15 minutes of physical training every weekday. Students also take math, chemistry, physics and English.

== Notable alumnus ==
General David L. Goldfein—Former United States Air Force Chief of Staff
