= Zellerbach =

Zellerbach is a surname. Notable people with the surname include:

- James David Zellerbach (1892–1963), American businessman and ambassador
- Merla Zellerbach (1930–2014), American author and activist

== See also ==
- R v Crown Zellerbach Canada Ltd, 1988 1 S.C.R. 401, a leading constitutional decision of the Supreme Court of Canada
- Crown Zellerbach Building
- Zellerbach Hall
- Zellerbach Rehearsal Hall
