= Arthur Ford (psychic) =

American psychic and medium

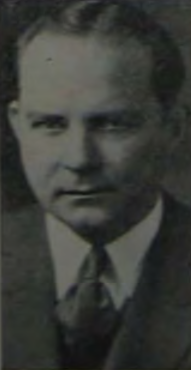
- Born: January 8, 1896; Titusville, Florida, United States
- Died: January 4, 1971 (aged 74)
- Education: Transylvania University
- Occupations: Psychic; spiritualist medium; clairaudient; writer
- Known for: Founder of Spiritual Frontiers Fellowship

Arthur Ford (January 8, 1896 – January 4, 1971) was an American psychic, spiritualist medium, clairaudient, and founder of the Spiritual Frontiers Fellowship (c. 1955). He gained national attention when he claimed to have contacted the dead son of Bishop James Pike in 1967 on network TV. In 1928 Ford claimed to have contacted the deceased spirits of Houdini's mother and later, in 1929, Harry Houdini himself.

== Early life ==
Arthur Ford was born in Titusville, Florida and grew up in Fort Pierce, Florida. As a youth he followed a pilgrimage that took him to Transylvania College, a Disciples of Christ school in Lexington, Kentucky. Ordained as a Disciples minister, he served a church in Barbourville, Kentucky. Ford said he realized his psychic abilities during World War I. He claimed that while in the army, he could "hear" the names of soldiers several days before they would appear on casualty lists.

== Medium ==
After the war he researched purported psychic phenomena. He became a spiritualist around 1921 and began traveling as a spiritualist trance medium, professing to be controlled by a spirit guide he referred to as "Fletcher." He eventually settled in New York City as pastor of a spiritualist church. In 1924 Ford toured the New England States appearing between the acts of the S.S. Henry's illusion production. The Sphinx, a conjuring periodical, stated in August 1924 that "he gave one of the finest talks on magic ever heard" in Athol, Massachusetts. He lost his interest in magic and became fascinated with the occult. He became a professional "hot and cold reader" and "billet reader", reading sealed messages given to him by members of his audience. This type of mentalism entertainment was very popular in the 1920s. He began to claim he could read minds. Ford claimed he had seen every miracle performed by Jesus duplicated, except the raising of the dead.

He developed a popular following, and in 1927 traveled to Great Britain. One of his lectures was attended by veteran spiritualist Sir Arthur Conan Doyle, who enthusiastically told people the next day, "One of the most amazing things I have ever seen in 41 years of psychic experience was the demonstration of Arthur Ford."

Ford was tested only once by the American Society for Psychical Research. He attempted to identify through psychic means the owners of objects (psychometry). He failed the test.

== Houdini messages ==
Following her husband's death in 1926, Bess Houdini began attending seances conducted by Ford. Author Andrew Lycett suggests that Arthur Conan Doyle encouraged a "vulnerable" Bess to believe Ford's claims that he could contact the dead in order "to win an important victory for Spiritualism". In 1928, Ford claimed he was able to contact Harry Houdini's deceased mother via his spirit guide "Fletcher". A year later, he claimed to contact the deceased Houdini himself and relay the full text of a secret message Houdini proposed to convey to Bess after his death. Bess initially endorsed Ford's claims, but later repudiated them. Authors William Kalush and Larry Sloman speculate that Bess Houdini's initial support of Ford's claims was due to the effects of alcoholism, and that she had romantic feelings for Ford. Others such as Milbourne Christopher speculate that the text of the message used a private code between Houdini and his wife that could have easily been broken by Ford or his associates using a number of existing clues.

The magician Bob Couttie has noted that others had known the message so it was not secure. According to skeptical investigator Gordon Stein the "secret" code had actually been previously published in a book on page 105 of Harold Kellock's biography Houdini: His Life Story and it was likely Ford had read it. It was alleged by witnesses that Ford told the journalist Rea Jaure at her apartment that Bess had given him the code. However, Ford denied the allegation and stated that he had been "impersonated" at Rea Jaure's apartment by a paid imposter.

== Allegations of fraud ==
After Ford's death in 1971, biographer Allen Spraggett and associate Rev. William V. Rauscher found what they believed to be evidence that the Houdini séance had been faked. They also found Ford's files: a collection of obituaries, newspaper clippings and other information disguised as bound poetry books, which they claim enabled Ford to research his clients' backgrounds. They also discovered evidence which suggested to them that Ford had faked a 1967 seance with Bishop James Pike in which Ford claimed to contact the bishop's deceased son. Psychology professor and critic James Alcock wrote that these revelations exposed Ford as a fraud, and skeptical investigator Joe Nickell has characterized Ford as "a clever fraud artist".

Loren Pankratz's analysis of the transcript of a 1964 séance which allegedly contacted a couple's dead son also demonstrates while the couple believed the reading to be a success, Ford made use of a number of cold reading techniques throughout the reading. His recounting of the events surrounding the son's death were also found to be incorrect when compared to the US Air Force investigation into the incident and some claims could not have possibly been true due to the location of the fatal incident.

Ford's biographer, Allen Spraggett, affirming that "The evidence is disquietingly strong that Ford cheated—deliberately as well as unconsciously," nonetheless concluded "With all his virtues and vices, dedication and trickery, humorous and awe-inspiring moments, saintliness and sinfulness, and above all, his mysterious, ultimately indefinable, powers, Arthur Ford was one of a kind, a great original. We shall not see his like again."

== Sources ==
- Spraggett, Allen (1974). Arthur Ford: The Man Who Talked with the Dead.
