= United Religions Initiative =

Global grassroots interfaith network

- Headquarters: The Presidio in San Francisco, California, United States
- Membership: +250,000 people

Leaders
  - Global Council Chair: Eric Roux
  - Founder: William E. Swing
  - Executive Director: Karen Volker

Establishment
  - United Religions Initiative Charter: 26 June 2000
- Website www.uri.org

The United Religions Initiative (URI) is a global grassroots interfaith network.

It has local and global initiatives through more than 1100 member groups and organizations, called Cooperation Circles, to engage in community action such as conflict resolution and reconciliation, environmental sustainability, education, women's and youth programs, and advocacy for human rights.

The organization was founded by William E. Swing, along with David Cooperrider and Diana Whitney. The URI founding Charter was signed by more than 200 people present, and hundreds more joining over the Internet, at a ceremony in Pittsburgh, Pennsylvania, US, on June 26, 2000.

URI also holds consultative status with the United Nations Economic and Social Council (ECOSOC).

== Activities ==
Before the formal charter signing in 2000, URI supporters around the world participated together in a project called "72 Hours for Peace", in which more than 250 local organizations united in projects promoting peace and justice during the turn of the millennium.

Examples of global and member initiatives documented in the public record:

- The Acholi Religious Leaders Peace Initiative has played a key role in promoting peace in war-torn northern Uganda. The Ugandan groups are also participants in the Northern Uganda Social Action Fund supported by the World Bank.
