= William Ford Nichols =

American bishop

The Right Reverend William Ford Nichols
- Bishop of California
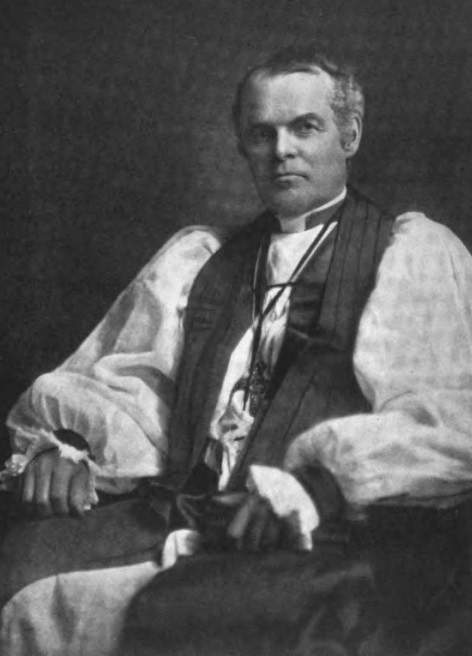
- Church: Episcopal Church
- Diocese: California
- Elected: February 6, 1890
- In office: 1893–1924
- Predecessor: William Ingraham Kip
- Successor: Edward L. Parsons
- Previous post: Coadjutor Bishop of California (1890-1893)

Orders
- Ordination: June 4, 1873 (deacon); June 4, 1874 (priest) by John Williams
- Consecration: June 24, 1890 by John Williams

Personal details
- Born: June 9, 1849 Lloyd, New York, United States
- Died: June 5, 1924 (aged 74) San Francisco, California, United States
- Buried: Cypress Lawn Memorial Park
- Denomination: Anglican
- Parents: Charles H. & Margaret E. Nichols
- Spouse: Clara Quintard (m. 1876)
- Education: Berkeley Divinity School

William Ford Nichols (June 9, 1849 – June 5, 1924) was the second Bishop of California in The Episcopal Church.

== Early life and education ==
William Ford Nichols was born in Lloyd, New York, on June 9, 1849, to Charles Hubert Nichols and Margaret Emilia Grant. He studied at Trinity College and graduated with a Bachelor of Arts in 1870. He then graduated from Berkeley Divinity School in 1873 with a Bachelor of Divinity and a Master of Arts from Kenyon College in 1888.

== Ordained ministry ==
Nichols served as private secretary to Bishop John Williams of Connecticut between 1871 and 1876. He was ordained deacon on June 4, 1873, and priest on June 4, 1874, at Holy Trinity Church. He was initially assistant at Holy Trinity Church in Middletown, Connecticut from 1873 until 1875. In 1875, he became rector of St James’ Church in West Hartford, Connecticut and Grace Church in Newington, Connecticut, while in 1877, he took charge of Christ Church in Hartford, Connecticut. Later, between 1887 and 1890, he was rector of St James’ Church in Philadelphia. He was also a professor of church history at Berkeley Divinity School from 1885 to 1887.

He married Clara Quintard (1857-1937) on May 18, 1876.

== Episcopacy ==
Nichols was elected Assistant Bishop of Ohio on June 13, 1888, however he declined the election. He was then elected Coadjutor Bishop of California on February 6, 1890, during a special diocesan convention. He was consecrated on June 24, 1890, by Presiding Bishop John Williams at St James’ Church in Philadelphia. He succeeded as diocesan bishop on April 7, 1893, upon the death of Bishop Kit. He was instrumental in acting on behalf of the presiding bishop in the transfer of the Church of Hawaii to the Episcopal Church in 1902. Nichols died in office at St. Luke's Hospital in San Francisco on June 5, 1924.

== See also ==
- Historical list of bishops of the Episcopal Church in the United States of America
