= Marc Andrus =

American bishop of the Episcopal Church (born 1956)

The Right Reverend Dr. Marc Handley Andrus, Ret.
- Eighth Bishop of California
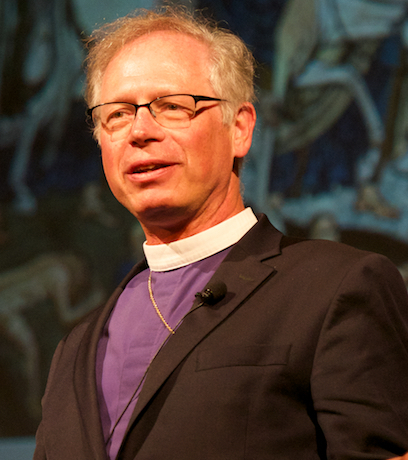
- Andrus in 2017
- Province: Episcopal Church
- Diocese: California
- Elected: May 6, 2006
- In office: 2006–2024
- Predecessor: William Edwin Swing
- Successor: Austin Keith Rios
- Previous post: Suffragan Bishop of Alabama (2002-2006)

Orders
- Ordination: April 25, 1988
- Consecration: February 7, 2002 by Frank Griswold

Personal details
- Born: Marc Handley Andrus; October 20, 1956 (age 69) Oak Ridge, Tennessee, United States
- Denomination: Anglican
- Spouse: Sheila Andrus
- Children: 2

Marc Handley Andrus (born October 20, 1956) is an American bishop of the Episcopal Church (Anglican Communion). He was the eighth bishop of the Episcopal Diocese of California until his retirement in the summer of 2024. Prior to his election as Bishop of California, Andrus served as a suffragan bishop in the Episcopal Diocese of Alabama.

== Life, education and ministry ==
Andrus was born in 1956 in Oak Ridge, Tennessee, to Mary Frances and Francis Andrus and was raised in Kingston, Tennessee. He received his Bachelor of Science in plant science from the University of Tennessee, Knoxville in 1979 and a master's degree in social sciences from Virginia Tech in 1982. After receiving his master's degree, Andrus went to work as a regional planner for the Accomack-Northampton Planning District Commission on Virginia's Delmarva Peninsula.

In 1987, Andrus was awarded a Master of Divinity degree from the Virginia Theological Seminary in Alexandria, Virginia. After being ordained deacon on June 20, 1987, he became the senior associate at the Church of the Redeemer in Bryn Mawr, Pennsylvania, and was ordained priest on April 25, 1988.

In 1990, Andrus became the chaplain at Episcopal High School in Alexandria, Virginia, until 1997 when he became rector of Emmanuel Church in Middleburg, Virginia. He remained there until his consecration as bishop suffragan for the Episcopal Diocese of Alabama on February 7, 2002.

Andrus was installed in 2006 as Bishop of California, where he oversaw the diocese's congregations and institutions in Alameda, Contra Costa, Marin, San Francisco, and San Mateo counties and the cities of Los Altos and part of Palo Alto. His leadership focused on key issues related to peace and justice, including immigration reform, civil rights for LBGTQ+ persons, health care, housing rights, and climate change.

Early in his tenure as Bishop of California, Andrus co-chaired a community coalition that paved the way for the rebuilding of St. Luke’s Hospital, San Francisco. His climate advocacy work took him to the UN Climate Conferences in Paris (COP21), Marrakesh (COP22), Bonn (COP23), and Katowice, Poland (COP24), as well as the Dakota Access Pipeline demonstrations at Standing Rock, North Dakota. While bishop of California, Andrus became a member of the We Are Still In Leaders' Circle, a diverse group of ambassadors for American climate action. He also served on the boards of the Episcopal Impact Fund, the Episcopal School for Deacons, Episcopal Community Services, and the American Bach Soloists, among other organizations. In 2020, he earned his Ph.D. in philosophy and religion from the California Institute of Integral Studies.

Andrus is married to Sheila Andrus, the former acting director of the Sparkman Center at the University of Alabama at Birmingham's School of Public Health. They have two daughters, Chloé and Pilar.

In October 2024, The Episcopal Church restricted Andrus' ministry to investigate an allegation of having an inappropriate relationship with an adult.

In June 2025, the Presiding Bishop of The Episcopal Church, Sean Rowe, entered into an accord with Andrus, continuing the suspension, “until Rowe is ‘satisfied that he [Andrus] has demonstrated sufficient amendment of life to permit his return.’”

== See also ==
- List of Episcopal bishops of the United States
- List of bishops of the Episcopal Church in the United States of America

Episcopal Church (USA) titles
Preceded by William E. Swing	Bishop of California; 2006–present	Incumbent
