= Church Divinity School of the Pacific =

Episcopal Church seminary in California, U.S.

Coordinates: 37°52′33.78″N 122°15′40.07″W

- Other name: Holy Hill
- Type: Seminary
- Established: 1893; 133 years ago
- Religious affiliation: Episcopal Church in the United States
- Academic affiliations: Graduate Theological Union
- Endowment: $16.2 million (2019)
- President: Stephen Fowl
- Dean: Stephen Fowl
- Head: Michael Curry
- Students: 83
- Location: Berkeley, California, U.S.
- Website: www.cdsp.edu

Church Divinity School of the Pacific (CDSP) is an Episcopal seminary in Berkeley, California. It is one of the nine seminaries in the Episcopal Church and a member of the Graduate Theological Union. The only Episcopal seminary located in the Far West, CDSP has, since 1911, been designated the official seminary of the Episcopal Church's Eighth Province, the ecclesiastical province west of the Rocky Mountains.

Trinity Church Wall Street announced March 4, 2019 that the New York parish had acquired the seminary. The Very Rev. W. Mark Richardson, CDSP president and dean, told Episcopal News Service in an interview that the deal will put the school on a solid financial footing and position it for growth. CDSP and its assets now belong to Trinity, he said, and the value of those assets “will be a fund, among other resources they have, that supports the program at the school and operation.”

CDSP is accredited by the Association of Theological Schools in the United States and Canada and offers degree and certificate programs aimed at training clergy and lay leaders for ministries in the Anglican Communion. It has EIN 94-1156508 as a 501(c)(3) Public Charity.

== History ==
Church Divinity School of the Pacific was founded in 1893 in San Mateo, California, by the second Episcopal Bishop of California, William Ford Nichols, after the gift of 4 acres (16,000 m^{2}) of land, funds for construction of the first building, and an endowment from George and Augusta Gibbs. Several of the seminary buildings were destroyed in the 1906 San Francisco earthquake. The seminary relocated to San Francisco in 1911 to a new building on the grounds of Grace Cathedral.

A move to Berkeley in 1930 facilitated cooperation with other seminaries in the East Bay, as well as with the University of California, Berkeley. CDSP was one of the founders of the Graduate Theological Union (GTU), established in 1962, and is now one of nine member schools and eight affiliated centers in this ecumenical consortium.

== Academics ==
CDSP offers students a variety of degree programs and courses of study. In order to keep up with changes and advances in the Church and in theological education, faculty members continually review curricula and make changes as appropriate.

- Certificate of Anglican Studies, geared towards students with M.Div. degrees from non-Anglican schools who are seeking ordination in the Episcopal Church.
- Master of Divinity (M.Div.) [on campus and low residence in January and July]
- Master of Divinity in cooperation with Bloy House, an Anglican house of study in Claremont, California.
- Master of Theological Studies (M.T.S.) [on campus and online]

Jointly with the Graduate Theological Union, CDSP also offers three advanced academic degree programs:

- Master of Arts (M.A.)
- Doctor of Theology (Th.D.)
- Doctor of Philosophy (Ph.D.)

Students may enroll in the M.Div. and M.A. programs concurrently. A separate admission process for each program is necessary, as is the completion of all requirements for each degree. Concurrent M.Div./M.A. programs can be completed in no less than four years.

Certificates of one, two, or three years of study may be given to non-degree students who have successfully completed the appropriate full academic years. These certificate programs include:

- Certificate of Anglican Studies (C.A.S) [on campus and low-residence in July]
- Certificate of Theological Studies (C.T.S) [on campus and online]

== St. Margaret's Visiting Professorship ==
The St. Margaret's Visiting Professorship of Women in Ministry is named in honor of St. Margaret's House, a school that trained deaconesses and lay women for ministry in the Episcopal Church when deaconesses were separate orders from deacons. The school was named after Saint Margaret of Scotland. In the early 20th century, students from St. Margaret's House were able to take classes with CDSP students. By 1966, with the gradual dismantling of separate orders of ministry for men and women, the House was merged into CDSP.

The first St. Margaret's Visiting Professor of Women in Ministry was Dr. Jenny Te Paa Daniel, who was a theology graduate of the Graduate Theological Union and the first Maori woman to earn a doctorate in systematic theology. She was followed by Dr. Suzanne Guthrie, who has served as parish priest and chaplain at Vassar College and Cornell University. The third St. Margaret's Visiting Professor will be the 26th Presiding Bishop Katharine Jefferts Schori who is a CDSP alumna (1994). She was awarded an honorary Doctorate of Divinity in 2001 when she was elected bishop of Nevada.

== Affiliated schools ==
The Episcopal School for Deacons is on the grounds of the CDSP. This school trains deacons for the Diocese of California.

== Notable alumni ==
- Keith Andrews, bishop of the Diocese of Western Anglicans
- Lani Hanchett, Bishop of Hawai'i
- Mark Hollingsworth (born 1954), bishop of Ohio
- Katharine Jefferts Schori (born 1954), 26th presiding bishop of the Episcopal Church
- Edward J. Konieczny, bishop of the Episcopal Diocese of Oklahoma
- Paul Kwong (born 1951), 2nd Primate of Hong Kong Anglican Church, and Archbishop of Hong Kong
- Brian Prior, bishop of Minnesota
- Daniel Richards, bishop of Upper South Carolina
- Nedi Rivera (born 1946), bishop suffragan of Olympia, provisional bishop of Eastern Oregon
- Michael Roberts, Principal of Westcott House, Cambridge
- David Roseberry, founding rector of Christ Church Plano
- Chester Talton, bishop suffragan of Los Angeles, provisional bishop of San Joaquin
- Brian Thom, bishop of Idaho
- Fran Toy, first Asian American Woman to be ordained in the Episcopal Church.

== Notable faculty ==
- L. William Countryman (born 1941), faculty member, biblical scholar
- Sherman E. Johnson, Dean, faculty member, biblical scholar
- Massey H. Shepherd (1913-1990), faculty member, liturgical scholar
- Louis Weil (1935-2022)

== Sources ==
- Robinson, Mary Judith (2001). From Gold Rush to Millennium:150 Years of the Episcopal Diocese of California. San Francisco:Episcopal Diocese of California.
