= Episcopal Diocese of California =

Diocese of the Episcopal Church in the United States

Coordinates: 38°N 122.4°W

Diocese of California Diœcesis Caldia-fornax

anglican

Location
- Country: United States
- Territory: Counties of Alameda, Contra Costa, Marin, San Francisco, and San Mateo
- Ecclesiastical province: VIII
- Deaneries: Alameda, Contra Costa, Marin, Peninsula, San Francisco, Southern Alameda

Statistics
- Congregations: 72 (2024)
- Members: 15,910 (2025)

Information
- First holder: William Ingraham Kip
- Denomination: Episcopal Church
- Established: February 5, 1857
- Diocese: California
- Cathedral: Grace Cathedral
- Patron saint: Francis of Assisi
- Language: English, Spanish, Tongan, Chinese, Tagalog

Map
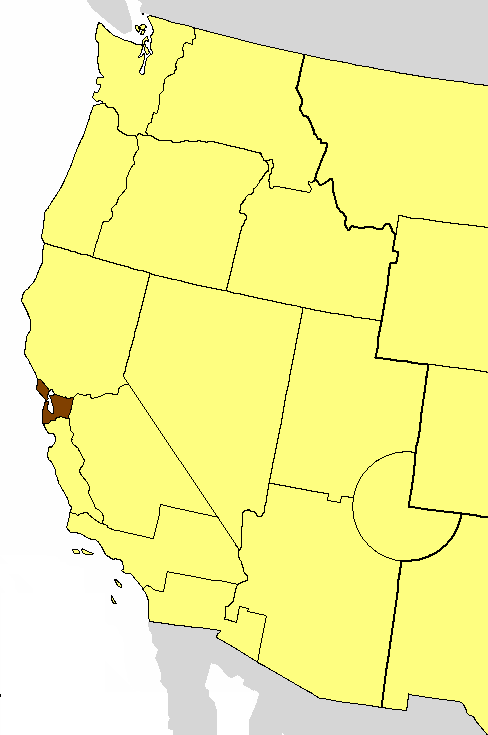
- Location of the Diocese of California

Website
- diocal.org

The Episcopal Diocese of California is an ecclesiastical territory or diocese of the Episcopal Church in the United States of America (ECUSA) in Northern California, encompassing a majority of counties in the San Francisco Bay Area. In 2024, the diocese reported average Sunday attendance (ASA) of 4,494 persons, down from 7,076 persons in 2015. Public membership figures cited a decline in membership from 24,473 in 2015 to 15,910 in 2025. The congregations of the diocese had $24,877,125 in plate and pledge income in 2025.

== History ==
The founding Episcopal diocese in the state, once encompassing all of California, today the diocese comprises Alameda, Contra Costa, Marin, San Francisco, and San Mateo counties, and the cities of Los Altos and part of Palo Alto in Santa Clara County, in the San Francisco Bay Area. The see city is San Francisco, California, and the diocesan cathedral is Grace Cathedral on top of Nob Hill. The primary convention of the Missionary District of California met at Trinity Church in San Francisco on June 24, 1850. The diocese was then established on February 5, 1857, when the first diocesan bishop was elected.

Fran Toy was the first female cleric to be elected as a deputy to general convention from the Episcopal Diocese of California in 1988 and was also the first Asian American woman to be ordained in the Episcopal Church.

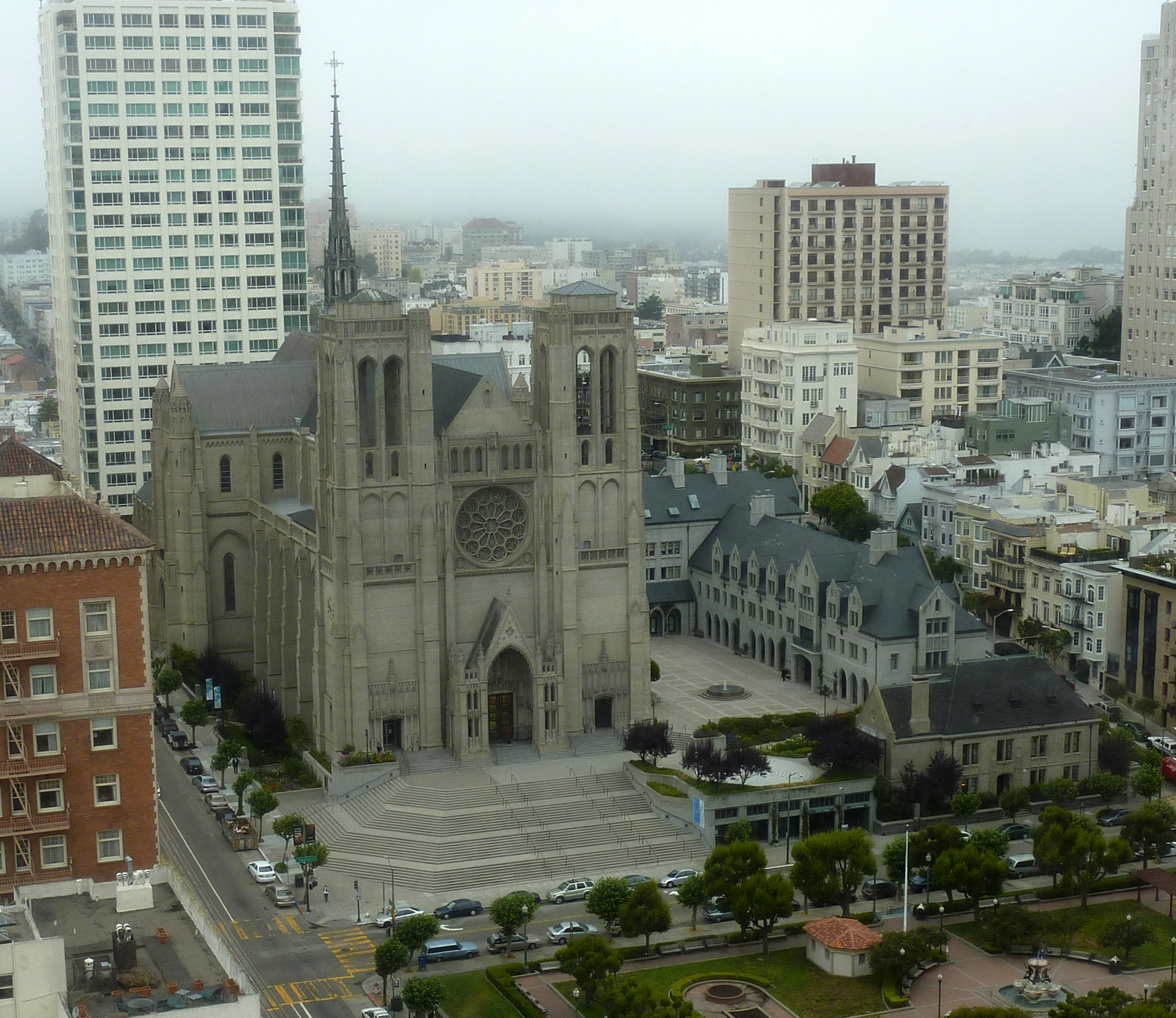
The headquarters are located in the buildings adjacent to Grace Cathedral on Nob Hill in San Francisco.

The eighth bishop of California was Marc Andrus, formerly suffragan bishop of Alabama, who was invested with the office on July 22, 2006, succeeding William E. Swing.

The diocesan convention elected Austin K. Rios as the ninth bishop of California on December 2, 2023. Rios was consecrated at Grace Cathedral on May 4, 2024, and currently serves as diocesan bishop having canonically succeeded Andrus in July 2024 after Bishop Andrus' retirement that month and being formally installed at Grace Cathedral on August 11, 2024.

=== 2006 bishop election controversy ===
In October 2004, Swing announced his retirement at the diocesan convention. By early 2006, after a search process, a slate of seven finalists were presented to the diocese as candidates to succeed him. Among the seven finalists were a lesbian and two gay men in long-term relationships with their partners. None of the seven candidates on the ballot had made an affirmation to the church that their relationship was celibate. Resolution 1.10 of the 1998 Lambeth Conference, a consultative body of the wider Anglican Communion without jurisdictional authority for any national church, had declared abstinence to be "right" for those not called to heterosexual marriage.

This election became widely watched by many in the Anglican Communion. Some feared that the elevation of a second gay bishop would cause a schism between ECUSA and the rest of the Anglican Communion.

Marc Andrus, suffragan bishop of Alabama, was elected on the third ballot with the openly homosexual candidates receiving only a few votes. His election was confirmed at the general convention of the Episcopal Church in June 2006. He was installed as the eighth Bishop of California on July 22, 2006, at Grace Cathedral, San Francisco.

== Congregations ==
The congregations are organized into deaneries—a designated geographical section within a diocese—as listed: Alameda, Contra Costa, Marin, Peninsula, San Francisco, and Southern Alameda.

=== Alameda Deanery ===
- All Souls, Berkeley
- Church of Our Savior, Oakland
- Good Shepherd, Berkeley
- Holy Trinity / La Santisima Trinidad, Richmond
- St. Alban’s, Albany
- St. Augustine’s, Oakland
- St. Clement’s, Berkeley
- St. James’ / Iglesia de Santiago, Oakland
- St. John’s, Oakland
- St. Mark’s, Berkeley
- St. Paul’s, Oakland

=== Contra Costa Deanery ===
- Church of the Resurrection, Pleasant Hill
- Grace Church, Martinez
- Holy Spirit Church, Concord
- St. Anna’s, Antioch
- St. Anselm’s, Lafayette
- St. Mark’s, Crockett
- St. Paul’s, Walnut Creek
- St. Stephen’s, Orinda
- St. Timothy’s, Danville

=== Marin Deanery ===
- Christ Church, Sausalito
- Church of Our Savior, Mill Valley
- Church of the Nativity, San Rafael
- Church of the Redeemer, San Rafael
- New Skellig Celtic Christian Community, Inverness
- St. Aidan’s, Bolinas
- St. Columba’s, Inverness
- St. Francis of Assisi, Novato
- St. John’s Episcopal Church, Ross
- St. Paul’s, San Rafael
- St. Stephen’s, Belvedere

=== Peninsula Deanery ===
- Christ Church, Los Altos
- Christ Church, Portola Valley
- Church of St. Matthew, San Mateo
- Church of the Epiphany, San Carlos
- Good Shepherd, Belmont
- Holy Child and St. Martin’s, Daly City
- Holy Family, Half Moon Bay
- Iglesia El Buen Pastor, Redwood City
- SEA Episcopal, San Bruno and South San Francisco
- St. Ambrose, Foster City
- St. Bede’s, Menlo Park
- St. Edmund’s, Pacifica
- St. Mark’s, Palo Alto
- St. Paul’s, Burlingame
- St. Peter’s, Redwood City
- Transfiguration, San Mateo
- Trinity, Menlo Park

=== San Francisco Deanery ===
- All Saints’, San Francisco
- Christ Church Sei Ko Kai, San Francisco
- Church of the Advent of Christ the King, San Francisco
- Church of the Incarnation, San Francisco
- Grace Cathedral, San Francisco
- Holy Innocents’, San Francisco
- St. Aidan’s, San Francisco
- St. Cyprian’s, San Francisco
- St. Francis’, San Francisco
- St. Gregory of Nyssa, San Francisco
- St. James, San Francisco
- St. John the Evangelist, San Francisco
- St. Luke’s, San Francisco
- St. Mary the Virgin, San Francisco
- Trinity+St Peter’s, San Francisco
- True Sunshine, San Francisco

=== Southern Alameda Deanery ===
- All Saints’, San Leandro
- Holy Cross, Castro Valley
- St. Anne’s, Fremont
- St. Bartholomew’s, Livermore
- St. Clare’s, Pleasanton
- St. James’, Fremont

== Institutions, organizations, and communities ==
=== Campus chaplaincies ===
Diocesan-affiliated chaplaincies are present on the following college and university campuses:

- Ecumenical House, San Francisco State University
- Stanford Canterbury, Stanford University
- Cal Canterbury, University of California, Berkeley,

Ecumenical House comprises Episcopal, Methodist (UMC), Presbyterian (PCUSA), and United Church of Christ (UCC) congregations, while Stanford Canterbury partners with Evangelical Lutheran Church in America (ELCA) congregations through Progressive Christians at Stanford: Episcopal Lutheran Campus Ministry.

=== Educational institutions and schools ===
The diocese operates The Episcopal School for Deacons (ESD) as a college for training vocational deacons. It previously met in retreat centers and the campuses of local congregations, and eventually moved on the grounds of the Church Divinity School of the Pacific in Berkeley, California in 1998.

The following schools, encompassing preschools and primary schools, are located within the Diocese of California and affiliated both with congregations in its jurisdiction and the Episcopal Church:

- St. Andrew's Preschool, San Bruno (P)
- Cathedral School for Boys, San Francisco (K-8)
- St. Clare's Christian Preschool, Pleasanton (P)
- Episcopal Day School, San Mateo (K-8)
- St. Paul's Episcopal School, Oakland (K-8)
- Sea Breeze School, Foster City (P-K)
- St. Stephen's Preschool, Orinda (P)
- Trinity School, Menlo Park (P-5)

=== Retreat centers ===
Within the diocese are three retreat centers, two of which are diocesan institutions (The Bishop's Ranch and St. Dorothy's Rest) and one being directly tied to a congregation (St. Columba's):

- The Bishop’s Ranch, Healdsburg
- St. Dorothy’s Rest, Camp Meeker
- St. Columba’s Retreat House, Inverness

These retreat centers are used both by religious and secular groups, ranging from summer camps and spiritual retreats to writing workshops and environmental forums. Diocesan gatherings such as the annual Clergy Conference (for canonically resident clergy in the diocese) and Vocations Conference (for those in the discernment process for ordained ministry) are held at these retreat centers.

=== Religious communities and societies ===
Numerous religious communities are resident in the diocese, either through individual members or established spaces in which their members reside and minister from:

- Brotherhood of Saint Gregory
- Community of Saint Francis (Women)
- Companions of Dorothy the Worker
- Society of Catholic Priests
- Society of Saint Francis (Men)

== Bishops of California ==
The following individuals have served as diocesan bishops, provisional bishops, bishops coadjutor, bishops suffragan, or assistant bishops in the Diocese of California:

=== Diocesan bishops ===
Bishops of California
| From | Until | Incumbent | Notes |
|---|---|---|---|
| 1857 | 1893 | William Ingraham Kip | Missionary Bishop to California, 1853–1856; died in office. |
| 1893 | 1924 | William Ford Nichols | Coadjutor 1890-1893. |
| 1924 | 1940 | Edward Lambe Parsons | Coadjutor 1919-1924. |
| 1941 | 1958 | Karl Morgan Block | Coadjutor 1938-1940, died in Grace Cathedral on September 20, 1958 |
| 1958 | 1966 | James Pike | Coadjutor 1958, resigned following censure for radical theological views. |
| 1967 | 1979 | Chauncey Kilmer Myers | Previously suffragan bishop in Michigan 1964-1967. |
| 1981 | 2006 | William Edwin Swing | Coadjutor 1979. |
| 2006 | 2024 | Marc Handley Andrus | Previously suffragan bishop in Alabama 2002-2006. |
| 2024 | present | Austin Keith Rios | Previously rector of St. Paul's Within the Walls in Rome, Italy 2012-2024. |

=== Suffragan and Assistant bishops ===
Suffragan and Assistant bishops in California
| From | Until | Incumbent | Notes |
|---|---|---|---|
| 1951 | 1958 | Henry H. Shires, suffragan bishop | Remained in diocese as archdeacon upon resignation until 1960 when successor was elected and consecrated. |
| 1960 | 1978 | Richard Millard, suffragan bishop | Later became suffragan bishop over Convocation of Episcopal Churches in Europe 1978-1980. |
| 2008 | 2009 | Steven Charleston, assistant bishop | Resigned after serving for one year. |
