= Allen-Stevenson School =

Private school in Manhattan, New York

Location
- 132 East 78th Street; Manhattan, New York City, New York 10075; United States; 40°46′27.4″N 73°57′35.4″W

Information
- Type: Private elementary for boys
- Motto: Fortiter et Recte (Strongly and Rightly)
- Established: 1883 (143 years ago)
- Head of school: Duncan Lyon
- Grades: Kindergarten to eighth grade
- Enrollment: 410 (2020)
- Campus: Urban
- Colors: Blue and Gold
- Mascot: The Unicorn
- Rival: The Buckley School
- Website: allen-stevenson.org

The Allen-Stevenson School is a private boys' school for kindergarten through eighth grade located on the Upper East Side of Manhattan, New York City, United States. It opened in 1883 and has been as its present location since 1924. The school has two divisions: Lower Division (K–4) and Upper Division (5–8) with a student body of approximately 389 pupils. The head of school is Duncan Lyon, the fifth head to be appointed since the school's founding.

== History ==
The Allen School was founded in 1883 by Francis Bellows Allen at a home on Fifth Avenue and 57th Street. Its first class enrolled only three boys. In 1885, the school moved to rented rooms at Madison Avenue and 44th Street with an enrollment of twenty boys. In 1904, Mr. Allen met Robert Alston Stevenson, a tutor, who by chance had taken a room at 509 Fifth Avenue, where the school was then located. In 1904, Mr. Allen and Mr. Stevenson joined forces and then moved to 50 East 57th Street with 100 students. By 1918, enrollment exceeded 200. The school published its first newspaper, The Spotlight, and introduced an exercise program and team sports.

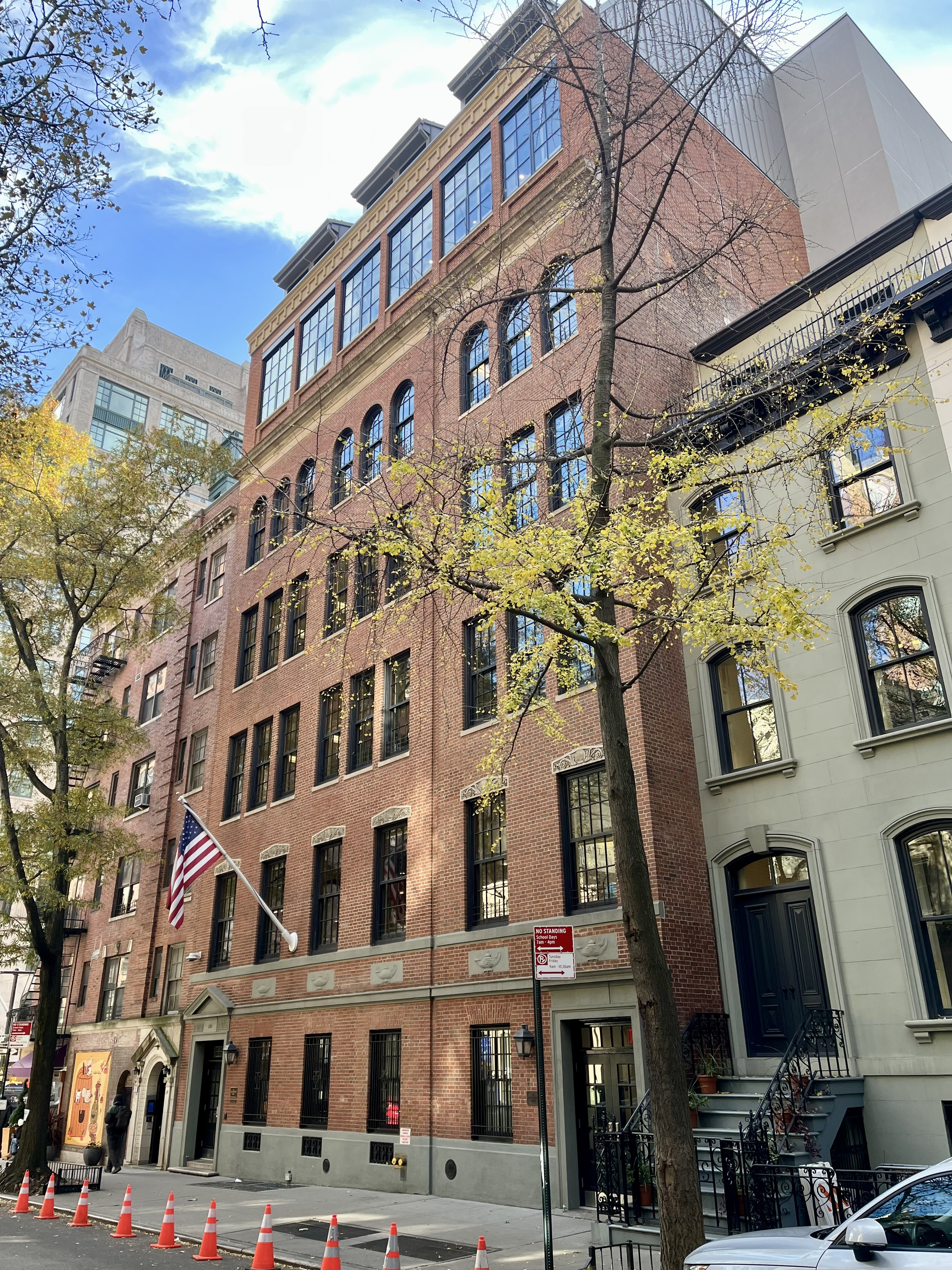
The school building on East 78th Street

In 1924, the school purchased two brownstones for a new schoolhouse and moved to its present location on the Upper East Side. In 1939, Mr. Allen retired at the age of 80, after 56 years of service. In 1947, Mr. Stevenson retired after 43 years of service. His son, Robert "Huck" Alston Stevenson Jr., who had taught at the school, succeeded him as headmaster.

In 1950, Joseph C. Rennard became headmaster of Allen-Stevenson and served for nine years. The school introduced team sports at Randall's Island and required boys to wear navy blue blazers and gray flannel pants. In 1959, Henry Dyer Tiffany Jr. became headmaster until 1974. Under his leadership, a modern science lab and a paneled library, a gift from the Bell family, were added.

Allen-Stevenson's school song was composed by Rolande Maxwell Young in 1968, the year she joined the A-S faculty as a lower-school music teacher.

In 1974, Desmond Cole (previously the head of United Nations International School) became headmaster and served in that capacity for sixteen years. During his tenure, he created the Middle School division.

In 1983, the Allen-Stevenson School celebrated its first 100 years and published The Allen-Stevenson Centennial Album. Around that time, an East 77th Street addition, designed by Allen-Stevenson parent Alfredo De Vido, was built onto the school.

In 1990, the board of trustees appointed David Trower as Allen-Stevenson's seventh headmaster. In 2001, the school launched its first website to improve communication about the school.

In 2007, a total renovation-expansion of the school interior was completed, which preserved the school's Classical Revival brick and Victorian brownstone facades according to New York Landmarks Preservation Commission guidelines for the Upper East Side Historic District.

In 2008, the school completed a year-long celebration of its 125th anniversary. The board of trustees approved "Allen-Stevenson and Its Community", a policy statement about inclusion and community life.

In 2009, Allen-Stevenson was twice recognized for its work on energy and the environment, first with an Energy Star rating by the U.S. Department of Energy, and then by the U.S. Green Building Council (USGBC) for LEED Gold Certification for Existing Buildings (EB). This made Allen-Stevenson the very first elementary school in the United States to achieve LEED-EB Gold status.

In 2015, Allen-Stevenson filed an application to the New York City Board of Standards and Appeals to build two new buildings behind the facades of existing brownstones for expansion of classroom, arts and athletics space, and cap them with an 18-foot rooftop greenhouse.

== Admissions ==
Allen-Stevenson has a highly selective admissions process. A financial-aid program ensures that the boys remain heterogeneous; as with many of its peer New York City schools. The school is private, functioning under a New York City non-profit statute, and is governed by a board of trustees and administered by a head of school.

== Academics ==
The school is divided into two schools that serve boys from TK (transitional kindergarten) through eighth grade. It has a rigorous academic curriculum and Allen-Stevenson boys go on to attend top-rated New York City high schools, including Collegiate School, Dwight-Englewood School, Ethical Culture Fieldston School, Hackley School, Horace Mann School, Regis High School, Riverdale Country School, Trinity School; and boarding schools, including Choate Rosemary Hall, Kent School, the Taft School, the Lawrenceville School, The Putney School, Phillips Academy Andover, Phillips Exeter Academy, and Deerfield Academy.

=== Lower Division ===
The Lower School consists of TK (transitional kindergarten) through fourth grades. Curriculum includes:

- Language Arts (Reading, Writing)
- Social Studies (Geography, Humanities, History)
- Mathematics (Arithmetic)
- Science (Physical Science and Biology)
- Language (Spanish)

Specialty classes include:

- Visual Arts (Drawing, Painting, Sculpture, Woodshop)
- Music (Rhythm, Music Theory, Singing and Instruments, Chorus, Ensemble)
- Library (Literacy and Research Skills)
- Science and Engineering
- Technology and Digital Fluency
- Physical Education and Athletics

=== Upper Division ===
The Upper school consists of fifth through eighth grades. Upper School curriculum: expands upon the foundations from the Lower School:

- English (Literature, Reading, Writing)
- History (Ancient World, Atlantic World, American History)
- Mathematics (Arithmetic, Algebra I)
- Science and Engineering (Earth Science, Biology, Physics, Chemistry)
- World Languages (Spanish)

=== Specialty classes ===
- Fine Arts (Drawing, Painting, Sculpture, Film and Media)
- Visual Arts (Computer Art, Visual Literacy, Design)
- Music/Performing Arts (Chorus, Orchestra, String Ensemble, Wind Ensemble, Theater, Technical Theater Crew)
- Computer Science and Engineering (Robotics, Design, Engineering)
- Physical Education and Athletics

=== Education technology ===
Allen-Stevenson's EdTech team, including Sarah Kresberg, Director of Library Services, and Ainsley Messina, Technology Integrator, has been at the forefront of exploring positive uses of artificial intelligence (AI) in schools. The team recently presented "Making the Machine Less Scary – Introducing AI to Your School Community", at the International Society for Technology in Education (ISTE). Messina was also included in Dan Fitzpatrick's book Back-To-School AI Guide 2024/25: 46 Steps & Tools for Educators Exploring Artificial Intelligence.

== Athletics ==
=== Programs ===
Allen-Stevenson has a competitive sports program for boys with eight interscholastic sports: cross country, soccer, flag football, basketball, wrestling, track, lacrosse, and baseball. The school includes both a varsity program for seasoned athletes and no-cut junior varsity teams. Allen-Stevenson offers a basketball summer camp for grades 4–8.

=== Accolades ===
Allen-Stevenson's basketball teams have achieved championship status, with the varsity team winning the Manhattan Private Middle School League (MPMSL) Championship in the 2022–2023 season. In 2024, both the varsity and junior varsity teams were league champions in the 2024–2025 season. The school's athletics program has a lengthy history, with forty-two total league championships across all sports.

== Headmasters ==
- Francis Bellows Allen (1859–1952) – 1883–1939; joined with Mr. Stevenson in 1904
- Robert Alston Stevenson Sr. – 1904–1947; became full-time headmaster after Mr. Allen retired
- Robert "Huck" Alston Stevenson Jr. – 1947–1949; took over when his father retired after 43 years
- Cesidio Ruel Simboli Ph.D. – acting headmaster, 1949–1950
- Joseph C. Rennard – 1950–1959; introduced navy blazers and gray flannel pants
- Henry Dyer Tiffany Jr. (1910–1994) – 1959–1974; added modern science laboratory and the paneled Bell Library to the school
- Desmond Francis Patrick Cole (1924–2008) – 1974–1990; expanded the science program, introduced micro-computers, and created the Middle School division
- David Ross Trower (1946–2023) – 1990–2022; greatly expanded the school's physical plant while incorporating technological education
- Duncan Lyon – 2022–2027; announced his resignation to become head of his alma mater, Cathedral School for Boys
- Colm MacMahon - 2027- - Leaving Head of The Rippowam Cisqua School in Bedford, New York to take this position in July 2027.

== Notable alumni ==
- Dan Abrams (class of 1981) – television host, legal commentator
- Jeremy Ben-Ami (class of 1977) – executive director, J Street
- Peter Benchley (class of 1954) – writer (wrote the novel Jaws (1974)); son of humorist and children's book writer Nathaniel Benchley; grandson of humorist Robert Benchley
- Bill Block (class of 1968) – founder and chief executive officer, QED International, an independent motion-picture production, financing and sales-distributions company
- Gerald Warner Brace (1901–1978) – writer, educator, sailor, boatbuilder
- Frank Brunckhorst (class of 1978) – chairman, Boar's Head Provision Company
- Jonathan S. Bush (class of 1984) – co-founder and chief executive officer of athenahealth; member of the Bush family
- Michael Douglas (class of 1959) – actor and film producer; won Academy Award for Best Picture for One Flew Over the Cuckoo's Nest (1975) and Academy Award for Best Actor for Wall Street (1987); received American Film Institute Lifetime Achievement Award in 2009
- Michael Eisner (class of 1957) – chief executive officer, The Walt Disney Company from 1984 until 2005
- Max Esterson (class of 2017) – professional racing driver competing in the FIA Formula 3 Championship for Jenzer Motorsports
- Charles Evans Jr. (class of 1977) – film producer and documentary-film director; produced Johnny Depp's first directorial effort, The Brave (1997); co-produced Martin Scorsese's Howard Hughes biopic The Aviator (2004)
- Andy Heyward (class of 1964) – chairman and chief executive officer, DIC Entertainment; co-creator of Inspector Gadget as a writer for Hanna-Barbera in the early 1970s
- Jeffrey Hollender (class of 1970) – co-founder and chief executive officer, Seventh Generation Inc.
- Charles Horman (class of 1957) – journalist; victim of the Chilean coup of 1973
- Honorable Pierre N. Leval (class of 1951) – United States Court of Appeals for the Second Circuit
- James MacArthur (class of 1952) – actor (known for the role of Danno Williams in the television series Hawaii Five-O)
- Colin McCabe (class of 1990) – co-founder of Chopt Creative Salad Company
- John Negroponte (class of 1953) – diplomat; lecturer in international affairs at Yale University's MacMillan Center; former United States Deputy Secretary of State; first-ever Director of National Intelligence
- Richard C. Perry (class of 1969) – hedge-fund investor; owner of Barneys New York
- Philip Proctor (class of 1955) – actor; member, The Firesign Theatre
- Richard Thomas (class of 1966) – actor, known for playing John-Boy in The Waltons television series
- Max Brockman (class of 2003) – writer for the television series Girls
- Luis Ubinas (class of 1978) – former director, Ford Foundation
- Roberto Mangabeira Unger (class of 1961) – philosopher and politician
- Christopher Weaver (class of 1966) – founder, Bethesda Softworks
- Chris Weitz (class of 1984) – film producer, writer, director and actor; co-directed American Pie and About a Boy with brother Paul (below); they are sons of actress Susan Kohner
- Paul Weitz – (class of 1980) – film producer, writer, director; screenwriter for the film Antz (1998)
- Norval White (class of 1940) – architect, architectural historian; known for writing the American Institute of Architects' AIA Guide to New York City
- David Yazbek (class of 1975) – Emmy Award–winning writer, musician, composer, and lyricist; wrote the songs for the Broadway musicals The Full Monty (2000), Dirty Rotten Scoundrels (2005), and The Band's Visit (2018)

== Notable faculty ==
- Stanley D. Gauger (1925–2012) – director of the music department and orchestra, 1948–1986
- Josh Harris (born 1964) – vice president and treasurer in the early 2010s; co-founder, Apollo Global Management; owner of several sports teams
- Donald Judd (1928–1994) – minimalist artist: taught art at Allen-Stevenson from 1957 to 1961
- Paul Kellogg – assistant headmaster and head of the Lower School, 1967–1975; general and artistic director of the New York City Opera, 1996–2006
- Jean G. Lamont - 1982-1992 - Head of upper school and Science Dept Chair - recruited as Head of The Foote School in New Haven, CT (1992-2004)
- Julia Kunin – art teacher
- Robelyn Schrade-James (1954–2014) – music teacher, pianist, performed at the 1964 New York World's Fair representing Steinway & Sons at age ten; also performed at Lincoln Center and Carnegie Hall.
- Rolande Schrade (1927–2015) – music teacher, 1958–1989, composer and pianist
- David Kersey h'98 (1943–2023) – at various points taught English, mathematics, history, and drama from 1968 to 2023

== Allen-Stevenson in the news ==
- Allen-Stevenson Gymnastics – May 1911
- Allen-Stevenson boxing matches – March 1912
- Mr. Stevenson's obituary – April 1948
- Mr. Allen's obituary – November 1952
- Mr. Cole refuses to close Allen-Stevenson during the Blizzard of 1978 – February 1978
- Tradition-Bound Allen Stevenson School Marks Centennial – May 1983
- Eighty members of the Allen-Stevenson School Orchestra, including then-Vice President George H. W. Bush's nephew Jonathan Bush Jr., perform at the White House on an unexpectedly rainy day in 1984, to kick off the White House Visitors Concert Series – May 1984
- A story in The New Yorker about Allen-Stevenson and dances – March 2002
- A legal battle being waged that could have a major impact on how community facilities – schools, churches and doctors' offices – are built in New York City's residential neighborhoods – March 1987
- Parents Protesting the End of Standardized Testing at Private Schools – May 2004
- An article about private school tuition – March 2004
- An article speaking on their "play street" – January 2023

== Affiliated organizations ==
Sources:

- New York State Association of Independent Schools (NYSAIS)
- International Boys' School Coalition (IBSC)
- National Association of Independent Schools (NAIS)
- Independent School Admission Association of Greater New York (ISAAGNY)

== See also ==
- Education in New York City
- List of boys' schools in the United States
