= Rolande Maxwell Young =

American composer and pianist (1927–2015)

Rolande Maxwell Young Schrade (September 13, 1927 – January 19, 2015) was born in Washington, D.C. She was an American composer, pianist, teacher, and the matriarch of a musical family with five children. After studying at Catholic University, she became a pupil of Harold Bauer at the Manhattan School of Music, and of Vittorio Giannini at the Juilliard School. In 1949, she married Robert Warren Schrade, an internationally-known concert pianist and faculty member at the Manhattan School of Music.

Young made her debut as a pianist at Town Hall in New York in 1953, performing works of Bach, Beethoven, Brahms, Grieg, Chopin, Rachmaninoff, Krenek, Debussy, and her compositions. She was a member of ASCAP.

In 1968, Rolande and Robert founded a family concert series in South Worthington, Massachusetts, incorporated in 1975 as Sevenars Concerts, Inc., a non-profit corporation under IRS Code 501(c)(3). The name "Sevenars" was derived from "seven Rs": Robert, Rolande, and their five children Robelyn, Rhonda Lee, Rolisa, Randolph (died 2022), and Rorianne, who all performed on the series at various times. The family and music festival were featured on radio and television, winning acclaim from the press. The Schrades were the first family to be listed on the Steinway & Sons artist roster, and they expanded when Robelyn married New Zealand concert pianist David James, who joined the concerts, as did their now adult children Lynelle and Christopher.

There are over a hundred published and recorded songs to Rolande's credit, including "Sunshine and Rain" and "How Can I?" (which sold over 500,000 records in the 1950s, "When the Train Came in" (with launched singer Teresa Brewer on London Records), "There's a Dream in My Heart" (RCA Victor), and "Mighty Paul Bunyan" (ABC Paramount). She also wrote new words and revised the music of the Carrie Jacobs Bond songs for Boston Music Co.

In addition, she composed dozens of educational songs to inspire children throughout her decades of teaching in the New York independent school system. She saw the publication of two albums of original songs and arrangements (Songs for Special Days and America '76, A Bicentennial Salute in Song) as well as the "Allen-Stevenson Song" (published in 1969 by the Allen-Stevenson School in New York City and still serving as their school song) and the Worthington Bicentennial March for the town of Worthington, Massachusetts.

She died on January 19, 2015, at the age of 87.

== Compositions include ==
=== Piano ===
- "Little Acorn Suite"

=== Vocal ===
- "A is for America"
- "A Little Less "Please", A Little More "Thank You""
- "Catch That Freedom Train"
- ""Do", See the Doughnut"
- "Don't Mention Me" (recorded by Frankie Castro)
- "The Footsteps of America"
- "Fortress of the Free"
- "From Your Heart" (recorded by The Bachelors)
- "Horn of Gold"
- "How Can I? (recorded by Bette McLaurin and Terri Stevens)
- "The Lady on the Shore"
- "Look for Joy"
- "Mighty Paul Bunyan" (recorded by Bobby Scott)
- "My Category is Love" (recorded by Tommy Mara)
- "My Kingdom for a Kiss" (recorded by Tommy Mara)
- "Santa's Lost His Glasses"
- "Somehow There's Magic in You"
- "Song of Peace"
- "Sunshine and Rain" (recorded by Teddy Bart and Bob Whalen)
- "Tender Age"
- "The Good Song"
- "There's a Dream in My Heart" (recorded by Jaye P. Morgan)
- "There's a Tremolo in the Trees"
- "Things I Shouldn't Know" (recorded by Jo Anne Lear)
- "Vacation Song"
- "When the Train Came In" (recorded by Teresa Brewer and others)
- "Will the Real Santa Claus Stand Up?"

=== Collaborations with Joe Leahy ===
- "My Category is Love"
- "My Kingdom for a Kiss"
- "Sun Valley Moon"
- "Sunshine Rain"
- "There's a Dream in My Heart"
- "Things I Shouldn't Know"
