= Cathedral School for Boys =

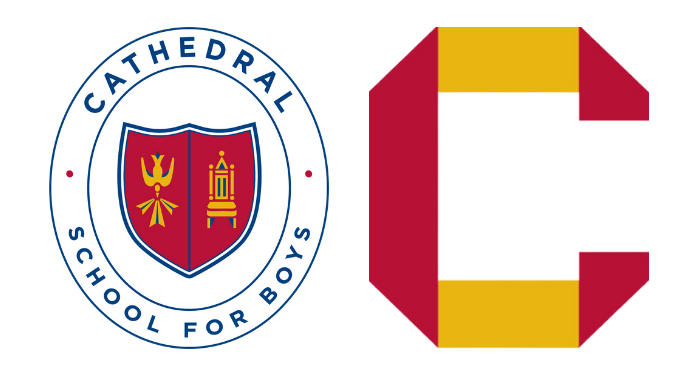

Location
- 1275 Sacramento Street; San Francisco, CA; United States; 37°47′31.8″N 122°24′50″W

Information
- Type: Private, Boys, Episcopal
- Motto: Minds, Hearts, Hands, Voices
- Established: 1957
- Head of school: Burns Jones
- Grades: K–8
- Enrollment: 256
- Student to teacher ratio: 7:1
- Colors: Red and Gold
- Mascot: Forbes the Hawk
- Accreditation: CAIS
- Affiliations: NAIS, CAIS, NAES, IBSC
- Endowment: $30 million
- Website: www.cathedralschool.net

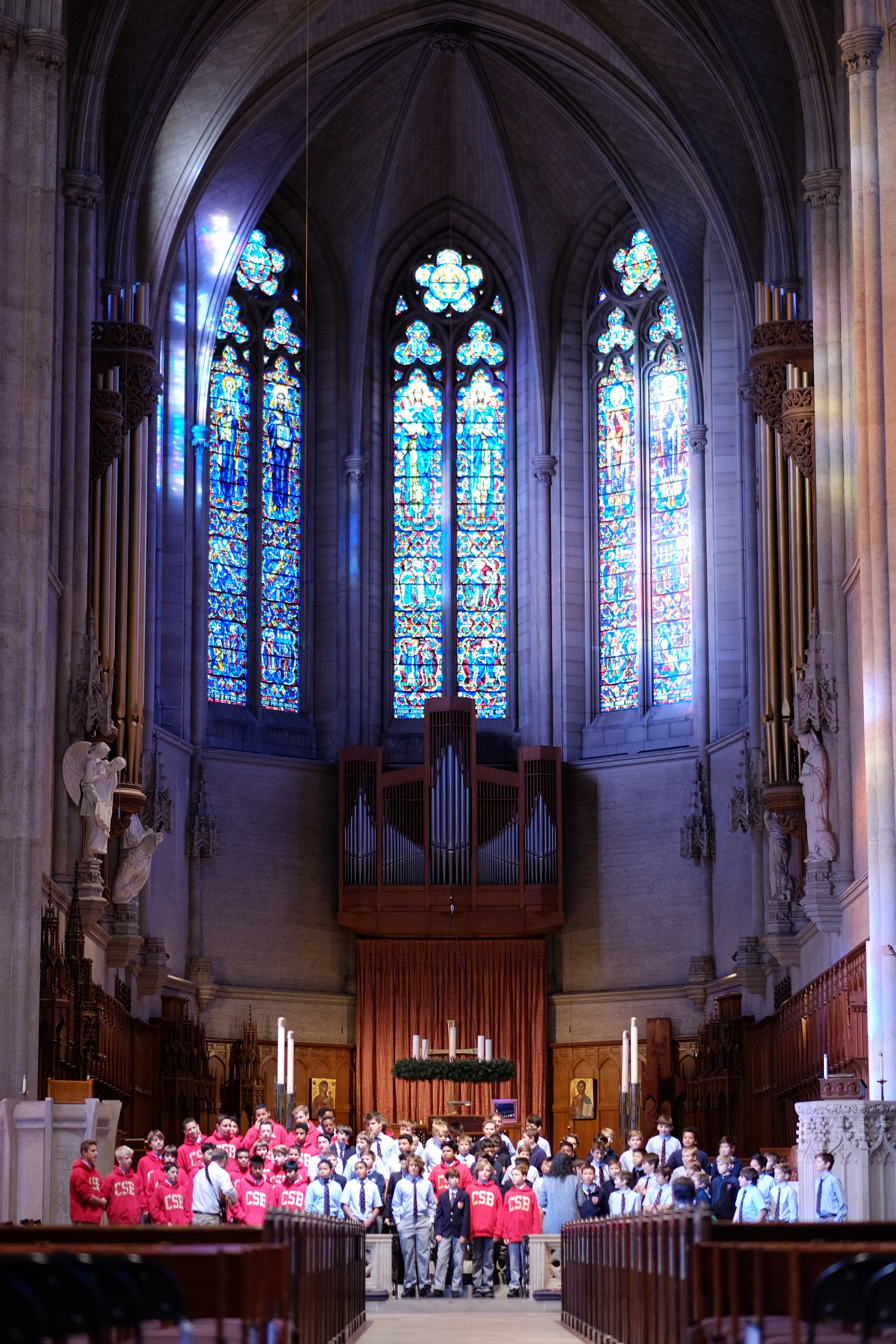
Lesson and Carols Rehearsal 2015

Cathedral School for Boys is a K-8 all-boys private Episcopal day school located next to Grace Cathedral on Nob Hill in San Francisco, California, United States. Students are drawn from across San Francisco and the Bay Area.

Founded in 1957, the school has two divisions: Lower School (K-4) and Upper School (5–8), with approximately 256 students and 60 faculty and staff members. The head of the school is Burns Jones.

Cathedral is a member of the National Association of Independent Schools, the California Association of Independent Schools, National Association of Episcopal Schools, and the International Boys' Schools Coalition. The school's motto is “Minds, Hearts, Hands, Voices.”

== History ==
Spearheaded by Grace Cathedral's dean at the time, C. Julian Bartlett, as well as several local families, Cathedral School for Boys was founded as an alternative to the existing single-sex schools in San Francisco, as well as to provide the cathedral with a source of choristers for its choir of men and boys. The school opened in 1957 in the offices and crypt of Grace Cathedral with 10 students in 4th and 5th grades, slowly expanding to 1st through 8th grades by 1962 and opening a Kindergarten in 1972. The school reached its current size in 1995 with the addition of a second section in the Upper School grades, bringing the student body to a size of 256.

== Campus ==
Construction on the school's building began in 1965 on the northwest corner of the cathedral's close, and the building opened in September 1966. Since then, the school has undergone multiple expansions and renovations, most recently in 2021 with the competition of the Learning Commons and renovations of all the classrooms in the original school building.

== Students ==
Cathedral School has two divisions: the Lower School consists of grades K through 4, and the Upper School grades 5 through 8. Cathedral's primary entry points are in Kindergarten, and later in 5th and 6th grades where class sizes grow from 24 to 36 students. All students wear a uniform; in Lower School, students wear gray slacks, a blue Oxford shirt, and black shoes; Upper School students additionally wear a school-issued tie. For special occasions, students also wear a blazer with the school crest embroidered on the chest.

The acceptance rate for 2026-27 was 23%.

== Athletics ==
Cathedral offers school-organized sports for all students in every grade. Among the sports offered are soccer, cross country, and golf in the fall; basketball in the winter; and baseball, golf, track and field, and volleyball in the spring. Cathedral competes against other private schools in San Francisco and the Bay Area, and it uses its on-site gymnasium and nearby city fields as facilities. Cathedral's mascot is Forbes the Hawk.

== Music and performing arts ==
Dating back to its founding partly as a choir school for Grace Cathedral, Cathedral School maintains a robust music and performing arts program. Classes in those subjects are mandatory from kindergarten to eighth grade, and all students participate in one drama performance every year. Students in grades 3–8 participate in the Field Foundation Public Speaking Competition annually. Additionally, all second graders have the opportunity to audition for the Grace Cathedral Choir of Men and Boys, one of only a handful of remaining Episcopal men and boys cathedral choirs in the country. The 25 boys in the choir are all students at the school, while the men are a professional ensemble.

== Notable alumni ==
- Edward M. Chen, Federal District Court Judge
- Leland Orser, actor
- Sean Wilsey, author
- Trevor Traina, entrepreneur and ambassador
- underscores, musician

== Recognition ==
- Mayor Gavin Newsom issued a proclamation that declared October 14, 2006, as "Cathedral School for Boys Day" in celebration of the school’s 50th anniversary.
- Included in the list of the 50 Best Private Elementary Schools in the Country by Thebestschools.org

== Heads of School ==
1. David Forbes – 1957–1958 (Founding Headmaster)
2. Peter Keating – 1958–1959
3. David Forbes – 1959–1972
4. Jefferson C. Stephens Jr. – 1972–1979
5. Richard Downes – 1979–1984
6. Michael Grella – 1984–1986
7. Harry V. McKay – 1986–1990
8. Malcom H. Manson – 1990–1999
9. Michael Ferrebouef – 1999–2015
10. Burns Jones – 2015–2027
11. Duncan Lyon '83 - 2027, Announced resignation to become Head of his alma mater in July 2027.

== See also ==
- Grace Cathedral (disambiguation)
