= Vido (surname) =

Vido is a surname. Notable people with the surname include:

- Giorgio Vido (born 1941), Italian politician
- Luca Vido (born 1997), Italian footballer
- Marcelo Vido (born 1959), Brazilian former basketball player

== See also ==
- Vido
- Vido (disambiguation)
- Alfredo De Vido
- Julio de Vido
