= Alan Jones (priest) =

British-American priest (1940–2023)

Alan William Jones OBE (March 5, 1940 – January 14, 2024) was a British and American Episcopal priest and dean of Grace Cathedral in San Francisco. A prominent lecturer in Episcopal and academic circles both nationally and internationally, he was a prolific writer of books, articles, and editorial opinions.

== Early life ==
Born in London, England, Jones was the son of Edward Augustus and Blanche Hilda (Hunt) Jones. A naturalized U.S. citizen, Jones received both his MA and PhD from the University of Nottingham. His PhD thesis explored the Anglo-Catholicism of Herbert Kelly, founder of the Society of the Sacred Mission religious order.

== Ordained ministry ==
Jones was a faculty member of Lincoln Theological College from 1968 to 1971. He subsequently served as the Stephen F. Bayne Professor of Ascetical Theology at the General Theological Seminary in New York City from 1972 to 1982. During his tenure, he founded and was the first director of the Center for Christian Spirituality. Jones was the dean of the Grace Cathedral in San Francisco from 1985 until January 2009 when he was made emeritus. He also moderated The Forum at Grace Cathedral.

== Personal life and death ==
Jones' first marriage was to Josephine Franklin Jones, the daughter of Newbery Award-winning author Madeleine L'Engle. They had two daughters and a son. They divorced in 1997. He married Virginia "Cricket" Franche Jones, an interior designer, in 1999.

Alan Jones died at a retirement community in San Francisco on January 14, 2024. He was 83.

== Bibliography ==
- (with Rachel Hosmer) Living in the Spirit, The Church's Teaching Series (Seabury, 1979) ISBN 9780816404247
- Soul-Making: The Desert Way of Spirituality (1989) ISBN 9780060641795
- Journey into Christ (Cowley, 1992) ISBN 9781563380327
- The Soul’s Journey: Exploring the Three Passages of the Spiritual Life with Dante as a Guide (Harper San Francisco, 1995) ISBN 9780060642532
- Passion for Pilgrimage: Notes for the Journey Home (Morehouse, 2000) ISBN 9780819218230
- Seasons of Grace: The Life-Giving Practice of Gratitude (Wiley, 2003) ISBN 9780471208327
- Reimagining Christianity: Reconnect your Spirit Without Disconnecting Your Mind (Wiley, 2004) ISBN 9780471457077
- Exploring Spiritual Direction: An Essay in Christian Friendship (Cowley) ISBN 9781561011728
- Living the Truth (Cowley) ISBN 9781561011834
- Common Prayer on Common Ground: A Vision of Anglican Orthodoxy (Morehouse, 2006) ISBN 9780819222473
