= Malcolm Clemens Young =

Malcolm Clemens Young is an Episcopal priest, author, and theologian and the ninth Dean of Grace Cathedral, San Francisco, the third largest Episcopal cathedral in the United States. He was installed as dean in September 2015. He is the author of The Invisible Hand in the Wilderness: Economics, Ecology and God and The Spiritual Journal of Henry David Thoreau.

== Education and career ==
Malcolm Clemens Young attended high school in Davis, California. He earned a Bachelor of Arts degree in economics at the University of California, Berkeley. After working as a management consultant with Monitor Company, he earned a Master of Divinity degree in 1994 and a Doctor of Theology in 2004 from Harvard University. Young was ordained as an Episcopal priest in 1995. From 2001 to 2015 Young served as the rector of Christ Church, Los Altos, where he founded Ventana School, an Episcopal day school for students in preschool to 5th grade.

Young is the moderator of The Forum, Grace Cathedral's flagship lecture series. He created the Innovative Ministries program, which includes the Tuesday night yoga class inside the cathedral that draws up to seven hundred people weekly. Young has also launched programs to expand the cathedral's social justice programs and digital offerings.

Young publishes a weekly video called More Good News on YouTube. He is a regular contributor on religion to the Huffington Post and the San Francisco Examiner. He gives papers and participates in the American Academy of Religion and the Pacific Coast Theological Society. He contributed the chapter "The Natural World" in The Oxford Handbook of Nineteenth-Century Christian Thought.

== Selected publications ==
- Malcolm Clemens Young (2009). The Spiritual Journal of Henry David Thoreau. Macon, GA: Mercer University Press. ISBN 978-0881461589.
- Malcolm Clemens Young (2014). The Invisible Hand in the Wilderness: Economics, Ecology, and God. Macon, GA: Mercer University Press. ISBN 978-0881464870.
- Malcolm Clemens Young (2019). "Nature" in The Oxford Handbook of Nineteenth Century Christian Thought. Edited by Joel D.S. Rasmussen, Judith Wolfe, and Johannes Zachhuber. New York, NY: Oxford University Press. ISBN 978-0198718406.
