= Russell Conwell =

American clergyman and academic (1843–1925)

Russell Herman Conwell
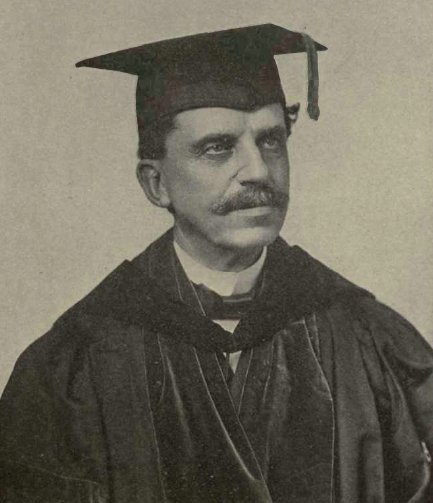
- Born: February 15, 1843; South Worthington, Massachusetts, United States
- Died: December 6, 1925 (aged 82); Philadelphia, Pennsylvania, United States
- Education: Yale University
- Occupations: Baptist minister, orator, philanthropist, lawyer, and writer
- Known for: Founder and first president of Temple University

Russell Herman Conwell (February 15, 1843 – December 6, 1925) was an American Baptist minister, orator, philanthropist, author, lawyer, and writer. He is best remembered as the founder and first president of Temple University in Philadelphia, as the Pastor of The Baptist Temple, and for his inspirational lecture, "Acres of Diamonds". He was born in South Worthington, Massachusetts.

== Biography ==
=== Early life ===
Hailing from a New England family of English descent and the son of Massachusetts farmers, Conwell left home to attend the Wilbraham Wesleyan Academy and later Yale University. In 1862, before graduating from Yale, he enlisted in the Union Army during the American Civil War. Conwell desired to enlist in the war effort shortly after its outbreak in 1861, but could not initially gain the approval of his father, Martin Conwell. His abolitionist father ultimately changed his mind, allowing Conwell to enlist in Company "F" of the 27th Massachusetts Volunteers, better known as the "Mountain Boys". Conwell and the Mountain Boys served in North Carolina and first engaged the opposition at Kinston, North Carolina. There Conwell gained a reputation for self-sacrifice.

During the "Gum Swamp" expedition, he returned to the battlefield to retrieve the bodies of two of his deceased soldiers, and later during the same campaign purposefully drew enemy fire upon his position – resulting in his being shot in the shoulder – in order to gain a tactical advantage on his Confederate adversaries. On September 25, 1862 he was commissioned as a captain (to rank from September 9, 1862) and placed in command of Company F of the 46th Massachusetts Infantry Regiment. He was mustered out of service, along with his regiment, on July 29, 1863.

After his nine-month enlistment, Conwell returned home to Massachusetts to convalesce after contracting a dangerous fever that plagued him throughout the summer of 1863. Upon regaining health, he volunteered for a three-year enlistment in the Second Massachusetts Artillery and was commissioned as a captain in command of Company D on September 9, 1863. He then returned to North Carolina and was placed in command of a fort in Newport Barracks. After his soldiers there had not been paid for three months, Conwell requested and received permission to travel to Newberne to secure remuneration for his men. While he secured a pass through the lines, he did not secure a permit to be absent from this post, nor did it appear that the 21-year-old Conwell understood the distinction. Twenty miles into his trip, Conwell learned that Confederate forces attacked and overran his company's position. When subsequently reported that the absence of Union officers contributed to the loss, Conwell was placed under arrest and detained in Newberne pending an investigation, resulting in him being accused of desertion by his detractors. Conwell was mustered out of the 2nd Massachusetts Heavy Artillery on May 20, 1864. While he claimed that he was later reinstated by General James B. McPherson, no military records confirm his statement.

Two months into his detention, and prior to the completion of the investigation, Conwell was assigned to Nashville, Tennessee, in June 1864 to join General MacPherson's movement against Atlanta. During the battle of Kennesaw Mountain, now Lieutenant-Colonel Conwell's arm and shoulder were broken during battle from an exploding artillery shell. While recovering from this injury, the atheist Conwell converted to Christianity in large part due to the heroism exhibited by his loyal private assistant, John H. Ring.

Upon recovering from this latest injury, Colonel Conwell was assigned to Washington with a dispatch to General Logan. But Conwell's health compelled him to resign and retire from service, whereupon he received an honorable discharge, as well as a certificate for faithful and patriotic service from the Commonwealth of Massachusetts.

After the Civil War, Conwell studied law at the Albany Law School. Over the next several years, he worked as an attorney, journalist, and lecturer first in Minneapolis, then in Boston. Additionally, during this period, he published about 10 books, including campaign biographies of Ulysses S. Grant, Rutherford B. Hayes, and James A. Garfield. In 1880, he was ordained as a Baptist minister and took over a congregation in Lexington, Massachusetts.

=== Baptist minister ===
Alexander Reed, a leader of the Grace Baptist Church of Philadelphia, heard Conwell preach when he visited him in Lexington, Massachusetts, and recommended that Conwell become a pastor for his congregation. The official "call" was made on October 16, 1882. Conwell's first sermon at Grace Baptist was on November 30, 1882. At this time the church was located at Berks and Mervine. That building was demolished in 1969 to make way for Temple University's Gladfelter and Anderson Halls.

The December 4, 1882 issue of The Public Ledger reported the following about the new minister and church:

Dedication of a New Baptist Church services conducted by the Rev. Russell H. Conwell, late of Massachusetts. The church proper on the upper story is in the form of an amphitheatre, and has seating capacity for between six and seven hundred persons. It is finished with great taste and completeness. The ceiling is frescoed, the windows are of stained glass and the pews of hardwood and handsomely upholstered. The edifice cost about $70,000.

Conwell ended evening services by holding an hour of prayer, leading song services, and giving commentary relevant to his sermons. The musical pastor often performed a solo piece during evening services.

Conwell's personality attracted large crowds that the church outgrew its capacity to seat all that wanted to come.

=== Hattie May Wiatt ===
Reverend Conwell used the story of Hattie May Wiatt and her 57 cents to spur phenomenal fundraising to build a new church. Hattie May lived nearby, and she and other children were gathered outside when Conwell walked up one Sunday morning. Conwell carried Hattie May on his shoulders and sat her in a corner in the back. When he ran into her walking the streets one day, he told her not to worry that one day they'd build a new church so all the children could come in. Hattie May died at six years of age. When she died from diphtheria, she had saved 57 cents to contribute to the cause. The girl's mother told Reverend Conwell that Hattie May had been saving money to help build a bigger church and gave him the coins. Reverend Conwell had the 57 cents turned into 57 pennies, told the congregation the story of little Hattie May, and auctioned the pennies for a return of about $250. In addition, 54 of the 57 pennies were returned to Reverend Conwell, and he later put them up on display.

On June 28, 1886, a nearby house at the corner of Broad and Berks streets, referred to as The Temple because the property owner did not want the house to be called a church until the mortgage was fully paid, was investigated for purchase by the Wiatt Mite Society, which was organized for the purpose of taking the 57 cents and enlarging on them sufficiently to buy the property for the Primary Department of the Sunday school. A few days later, the congregation agreed to purchase the lot. The first payment for the lot was 57 cents. The property was conveyed to the church on January 31, 1887. In that same house, the first classes of Temple College, later Temple University, were held. The house was later sold to allow Temple College to move and the Baptist Temple (now the Temple Performing Arts Center) to grow, and still, more of that money went towards founding the Samaritan Hospital. This story so touched Conwell that he repeated it many times. The transcript for the sermon where Conwell tells this story in full is available at Temple University Libraries.

In September 1887, at the Centennial Celebration of the United States Constitution, money received from the Wiatt Mite Society was given "for the success of the new Temple". This was the first time the name "Temple" was used in place of the church name.

In 1888, the youth group considered becoming a worldwide organization. The pastor was a speaker at a Christian Endeavor convention. Conwell was very impressed by the purpose and enthusiasm of the group. He later recommended the Christian Endeavor to the youth group of the church. On September 10, 1888, the Society of Christian Endeavor was finally organized. The Christian Endeavor youth groups continued to meet at the Church until the 1960s.

Charles M. Davis, a young deacon, approached the pastor with his desire to preach; however, Davis had little education and was without sufficient funds to continue his studies. Conwell agreed to tutor him. Over the next few days, seven prospective students met with Conwell, and Temple College was conceived. Conwell became president of the college, now known as Temple University.

As the membership continued to grow to over one thousand and the Sunday School to even greater numbers, a larger facility was needed. Consequently, on March 29, 1889, a contract was negotiated to build the new church. The ground was broken for the new building on March 27, 1889, and the cornerstone was laid on July 13, 1889.

On February 15, 1891, Conwell preached his last sermon in the old church at Marvine and Berks Streets. He preached the first sermon at the new building on March 1. Sixty people were baptized in the afternoon, and several addresses were given. The Rev. L. B. Hartman, the first minister, was present. The celebration continued throughout the week, and the church was filled to capacity for all of its services. The new church later became known as The Baptist Temple.

The congregation of the church continues today as the Grace Baptist Church.

=== Acres of Diamonds ===
Russell H. Conwell: Acres of Diamonds

The original inspiration for Acres of Diamonds, Conwell's most famous essay, occurred in 1869 when Conwell was traveling in the Middle East. The work began as a speech, "at first given," wrote Conwell in 1913, "before a reunion of my old comrades of the Forty-sixth Massachusetts Regiment, which served in the Civil War and in which I was captain." It was delivered as a lecture on the Chautauqua circuit prior to his becoming pastor of the Grace Baptist Church in Philadelphia in 1882 and was first published in book form in 1890 by the John Y. Huber Company of Philadelphia. Before his death in 1925, Conwell would deliver it over 6,152 times around the world.

The central idea of the work is that one need not look elsewhere for opportunity, achievement, or fortune; the resources to achieve all good things are present in one's own community. This theme is developed by an introductory anecdote, credited by Conwell to an Arab guide, about a man who wanted to find diamonds so badly that he sold his property and went off in futile search for them. The new owner of his home discovered that a rich diamond mine was located right there on the property. Conwell elaborates on the theme through examples of success, genius, service, or other virtues involving ordinary Americans contemporary to his audience: "dig in your own backyard!"

In A People's History of the United States, historian Howard Zinn comments that the message was that anyone could get rich if he tried hard enough, while implying that Conwell held elitist attitudes by quoting the following from his speech:

I say that you ought to get rich, and it is your duty to get rich ... The men who get rich may be the most honest men you find in the community. Let me say here clearly ... ninety-eight out of one hundred of the rich men of America are honest. That is why they are rich. That is why they are trusted with money. That is why they carry on great enterprises and find plenty of people to work with them. It is because they are honest men. ... I sympathize with the poor, but the number of poor who are to be sympathized with is very small. To sympathize with a man whom God has punished for his sins ... is to do wrong. ... Let us remember there is not a poor person in the United States who was not made poor by his own shortcomings...

Conwell's capacity to establish Temple University and his other civic projects largely derived from the income that he earned from this speech. The book has been regarded as a classic of New Thought literature since the 1870s. After Conwell's death, proceeds from this speech were dedicated to the Sunday Breakfast Association, a homeless shelter in Philadelphia.

== Legacy ==
Conwell's name lives on in the present-day Gordon-Conwell Theological Seminary, in South Hamilton, Massachusetts, an interdenominational evangelical theological seminary formed in 1969 by the merging of two former divinity schools, Conwell School of Theology of Temple University in Philadelphia and Gordon Divinity School in Wenham, Massachusetts.

Russell Conwell Middle Magnet School in Philadelphia bears his name as well. The school yearbook is entitled Acres of Diamonds. Temple University's football team wear diamond decals on their helmets and diamond trim on their collars to reference Conwell's "Acres of Diamonds" speech.

The film Johnny Ring and the Captain's Sword (1921) is based upon Conwell's writings regarding his experiences in the Civil War.

The elementary school in Worthington, Massachusetts, his home town, bears his name.

It is rumored that Conwell's body is frozen and stored in the basement of Wachman Hall for preservation and the possibility of reanimation.

== Selected works ==
- Acres of Diamonds
- Life of Charles Haddon Spurgeon, the World's Greatest Preacher, 1892
- Every Man His Own University, 1917
- Increasing Personal Efficiency, 1917
- The Key to Success, 1917
- Health Healing and Faith, 1921
- Praying for Money, 1921
- Subconscious Religion, 1921
- Why Lincoln Laughed, 1922
- The Romantic Rise of a Great American (biography of John Wanamaker), 1924

Academic offices
| New title | President of Temple University; 1887–1925 | Succeeded by Charles Ezra Beury |
