= Grace Cathedral, San Francisco =

Cathedral church of the Episcopal Diocese of California in San Francisco

Grace Cathedral
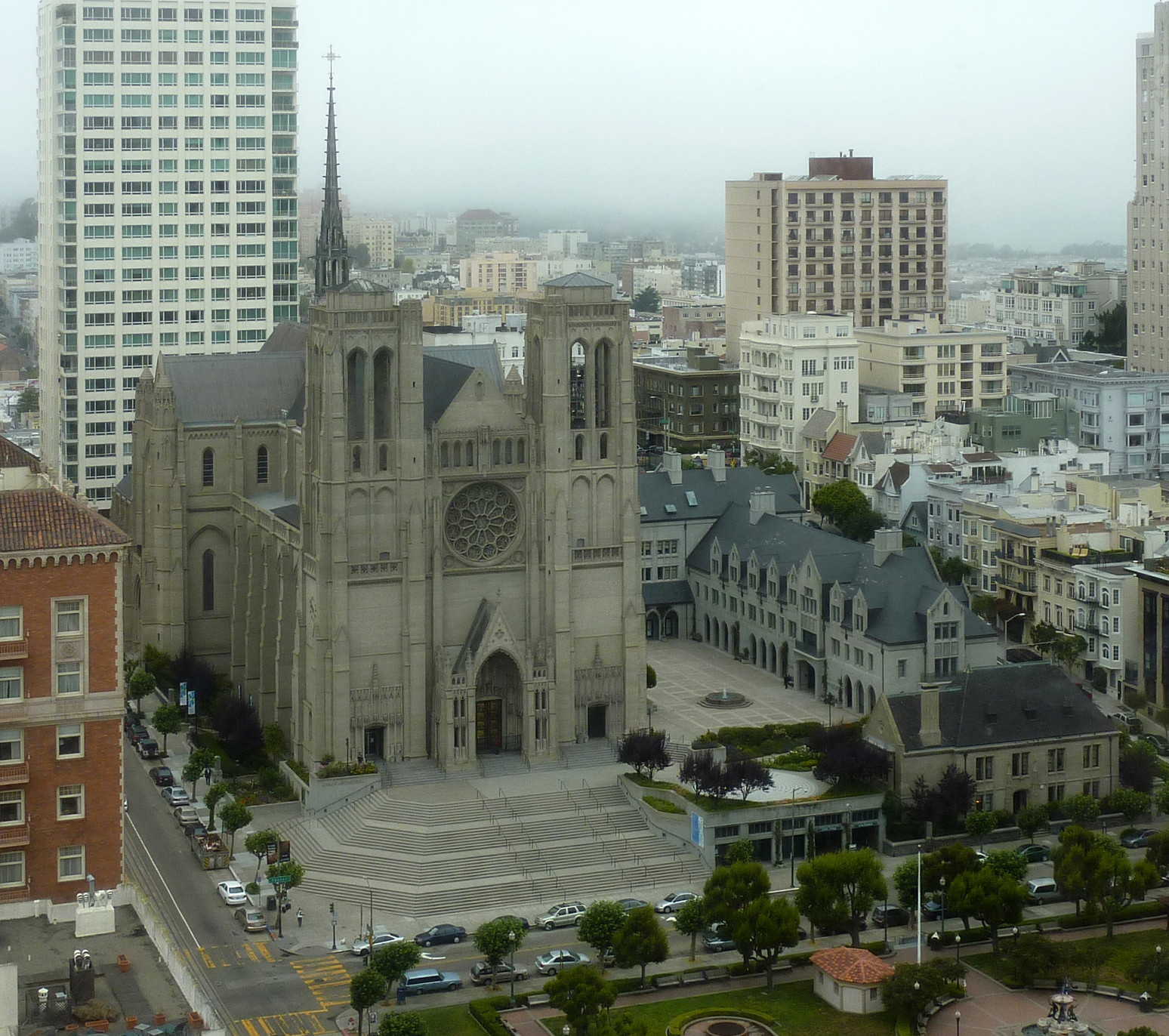
- Grace Cathedral
- Location: 1100 California St, San Francisco, California
- Country: United States
- Denomination: Episcopal Church
- Website: gracecathedral.org

History
- Founded: 1849
- Consecrated: March 28, 1964

Architecture
- Architect: Lewis P. Hobart
- Architectural type: Cathedral
- Style: French Gothic
- Groundbreaking: February 27, 1927

Specifications
- Length: 329 feet (100 m)
- Width: 162 feet (49 m)

Administration
- Diocese: Diocese of California

Clergy
- Bishop: The Rt. Rev. Austin Keith Rios
- Dean: The Very Rev. Malcolm Clemens Young

Grace Cathedral is an American cathedral of the Episcopal Church in San Francisco, California. On top of Nob Hill, Grace is the cathedral church of the Episcopal Diocese of California, led by Bishop Austin Keith Rios since 2024, while the cathedral's local parish has been led by Dean Malcolm Clemens Young since 2015.

The cathedral reported 2,302 members in 2015 and 1,652 members in 2025. Plate and pledge income for the congregation in 2025 was $3,907,212 with average Sunday attendance (ASA) of 453. This was a relative decrease from ASA of 719 persons reported in 2017.

The parish, founded in 1849, lost its previous church building in the 1906 San Francisco earthquake. The parish opened a temporary facility in 1907, raised enough funds to start construction of the present cathedral in 1927, started using it in 1934, and completed final construction in 1964. The cathedral is known for its murals by Jan Henryk De Rosen and Antonio Sotomayor, a replica of Ghiberti's Gates of Paradise, two labyrinths, varied stained glass windows, Keith Haring AIDS chapel altarpiece, Our Lady of the Flowers by David LaChapelle, and medieval and contemporary furnishings, as well as its forty-four bell carillon, three organs, and choirs.

== History ==
The cathedral's ancestral parish, Grace Church, was founded in 1849 during the California Gold Rush. Little Grace Pro-Cathedral (1907) was built on the new site, flanking Taylor Street near California Street, and a cathedral design by noted English Gothic Revival architect George Frederick Bodley was accepted. Little Grace was built on Powell near Jackson, across the street from the first Episcopal church in San Francisco, Trinity Church. After Trinity Church moved away, Grace Church moved into the larger building; this third church, unofficially referred to as Grace "Cathedral" because of its size. In 1862, construction began at California and Stockton. The new church was consecrated on May 3, 1868. Prominent members of San Francisco society joined the parish in the third church, including Leland Stanford and William Henry Crocker.

In 1865, Mark Twain published in The Californian newspaper purported private correspondence between himself and potential short-term rectors, satirizing the church's somewhat unsuccessful efforts to find a short-term rector in the 1860s and 1870s, "stating" that he had written to one New York priest who had already turned down Grace's offer of $7,000 per year (equivalent to $147,000 in 2025): "A word in your ear: say nothing to anybody - keep dark - but just pack up your traps and come along out here... They never expected you to clinch a bargain like that. I will go to work and get up a little competition among the cloth". Among the short-term rectors were roll film inventor Hannibal Goodwin and James Smith Bush, the great-grandfather of former US President George H. W. Bush and great-great-grandfather of former US President George W. Bush.

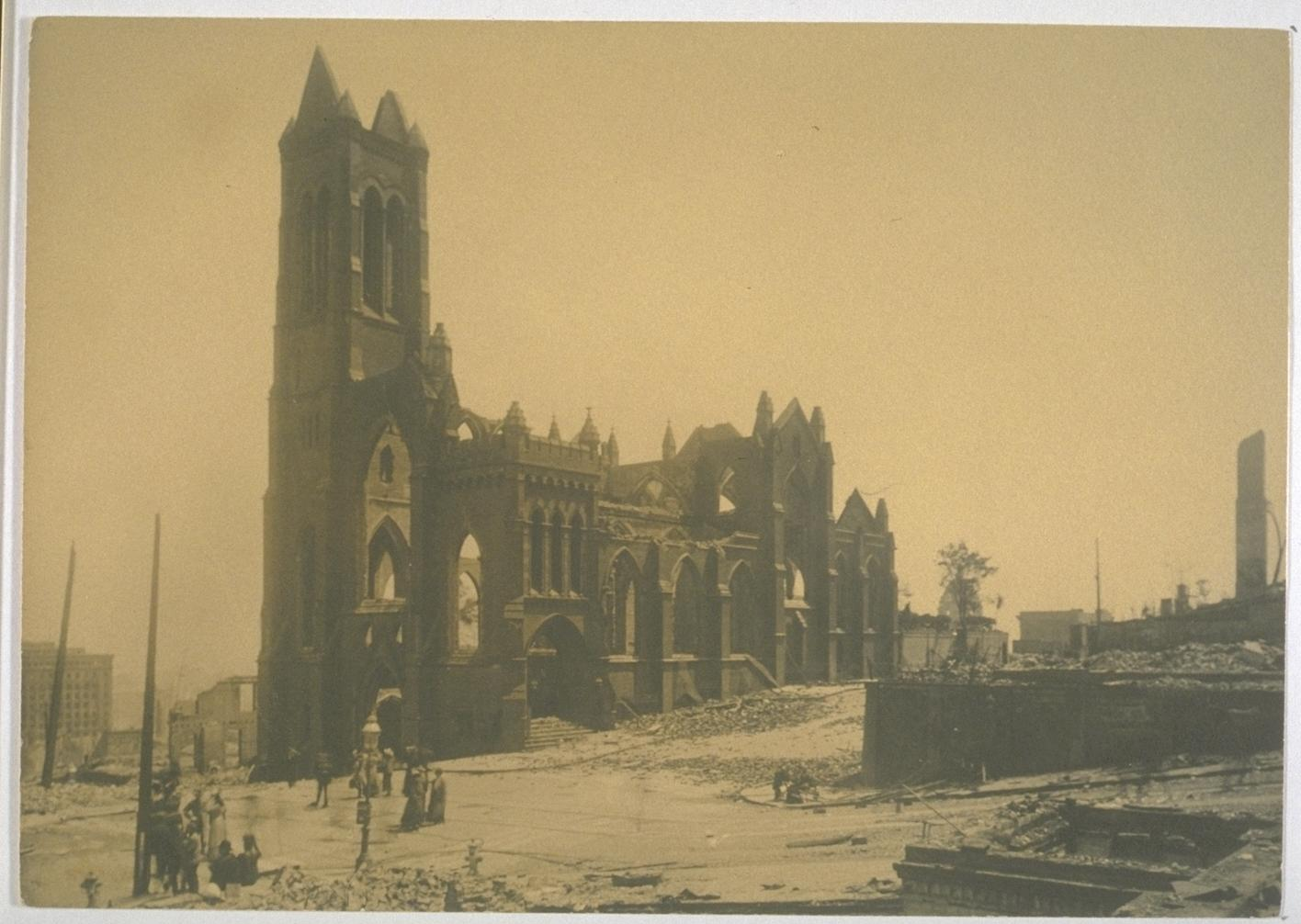
The cathedral shortly after the 1906 earthquake

When the 1862 building was destroyed in the fire following the 1906 earthquake, the Grace parish opened a temporary facility in 1907. The family of railroad baron and banker William Henry Crocker donated the site of their ruined Nob Hill property (on the block bounded by California, Jones, Sacramento, and Taylor) for a diocesan cathedral, which took its name and founding congregation from the nearby Grace parish.

Dean J. Wilmer Gresham nurtured the young cathedral and work began on the present structure with the laying of the cornerstone in 1910. The cathedral was designed in English Gothic style by George Frederick Bodley in London, who died in 1907, with Lewis P. Hobart of San Francisco completing the plans thereafter. The parish raised enough funds to build a few small portions, moving the parish services into a small completed section in 1912, then moving into the larger crypt, when that was completed in 1914. At a dinner event in 1927, Bishop Edward L. Parsons told the audience that the Episcopal Diocese of California was launching a fundraising effort in 1928, looking to raise $3.6 million (equivalent to $67.5 million in 2025) to complete the full cathedral.

Over the next six years, the cathedral continued to expand, though the Great Depression hampered fundraising. By 1934, Grace parish was able to move its services into the chancel and partially complete nave of the cathedral. Further construction was put on hold until 1960, with the exception of one (of the two) bell towers, which was addressed whenever funds allowed, taking over seven years (1936–1943) to complete. Grace Cathedral remained in this state, with a large vacant space between the partial section of nave and the single bell tower, for the next 17 years. Once construction restarted in 1960, the cathedral quickly advanced, and was completed in 1964 as the third largest Episcopal cathedral in the nation.

On March 28, 1965, Martin Luther King Jr. gave a sermon at Grace Cathedral as part of the festival celebrating its completion and consecration. The service took place on the Fourth Sunday of Lent. Approximately 5,000 people were present to hear King's sermon. It was the largest gathering at the cathedral for the next 36 years, until the September 11, 2001, memorial service took place.

== Beliefs ==
=== Marriage ===
The church has an inclusive vision and celebrates both opposite-sex marriages and same-sex marriages.

== Design and features ==
Façade

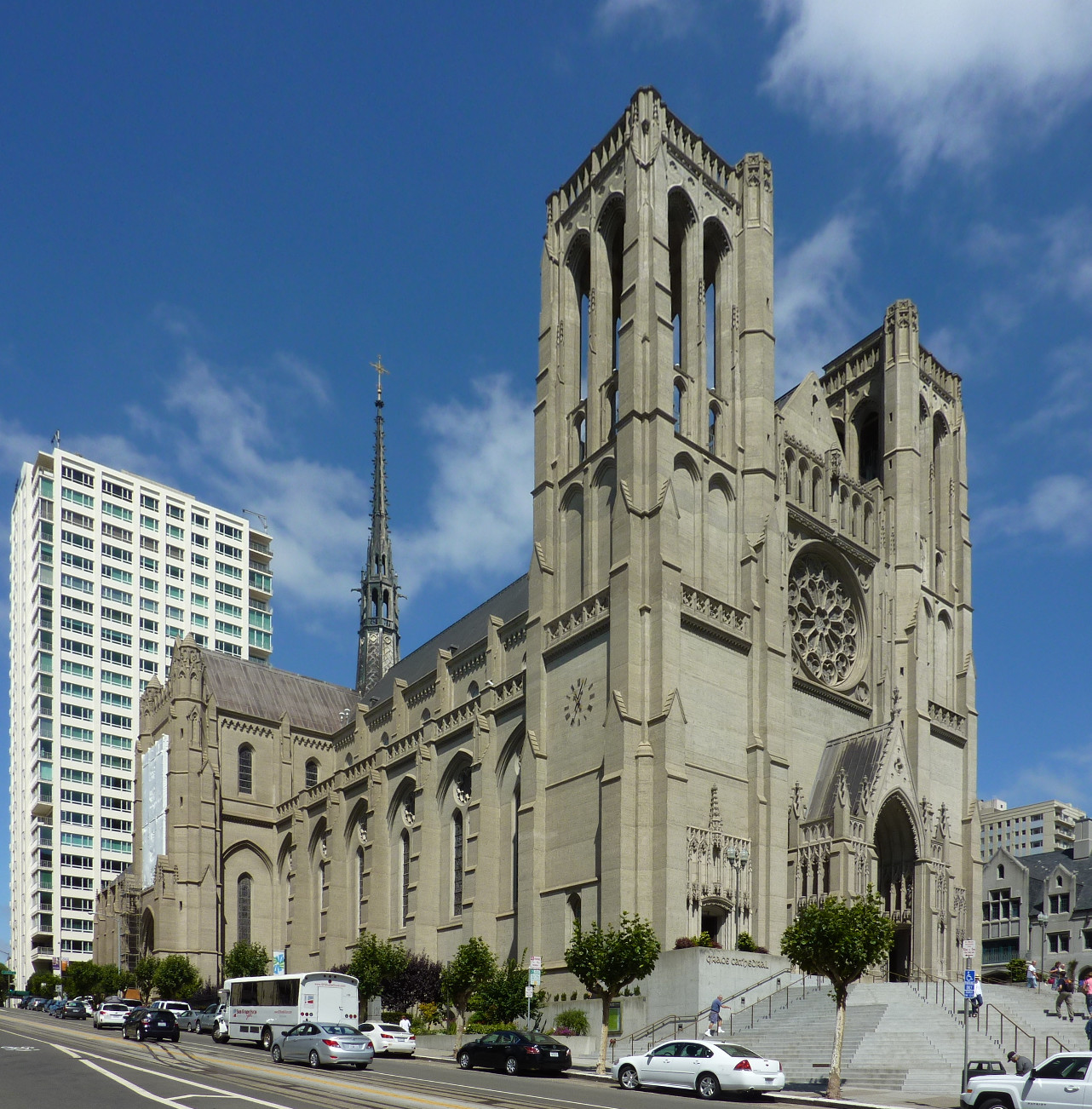
Three-quarters view of cathedral

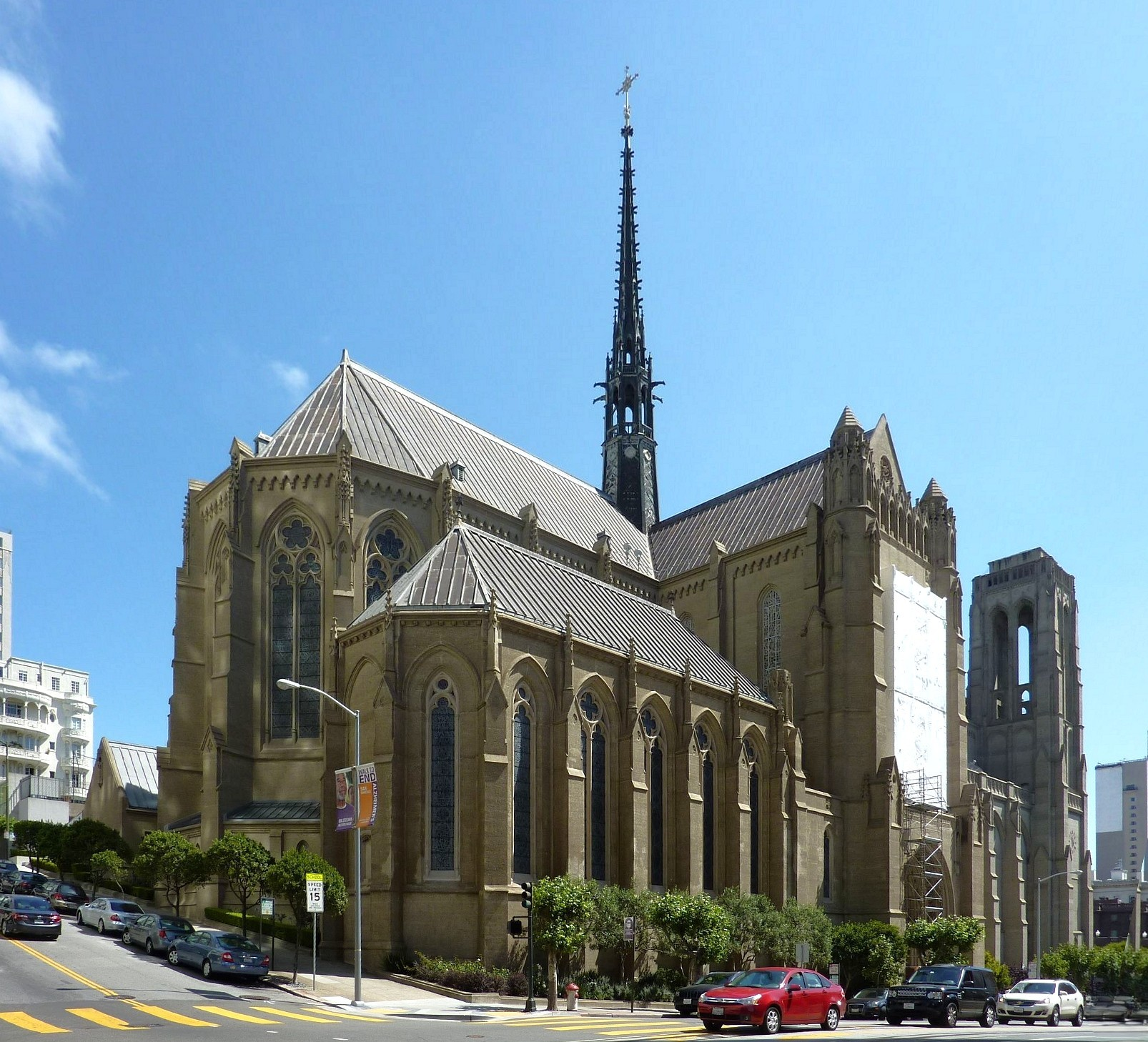
From California Street

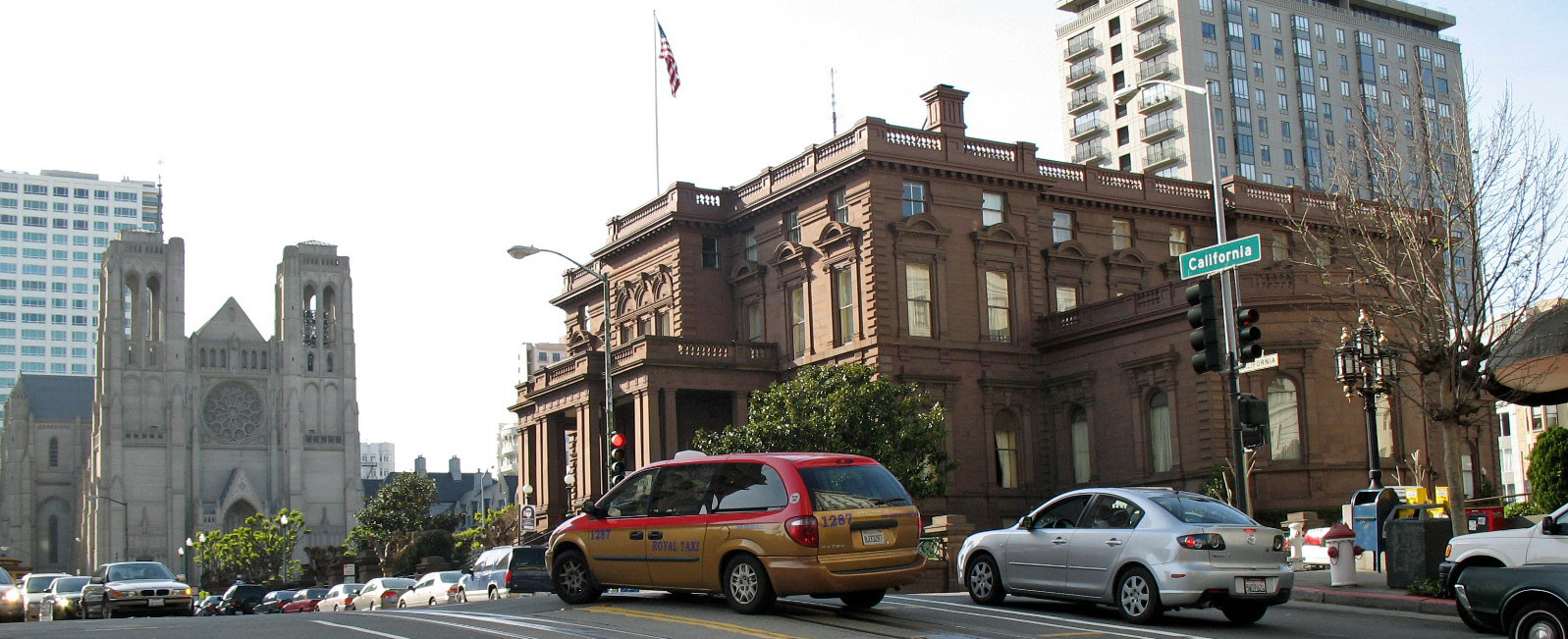
Crest of Nob Hill, with Flood Mansion

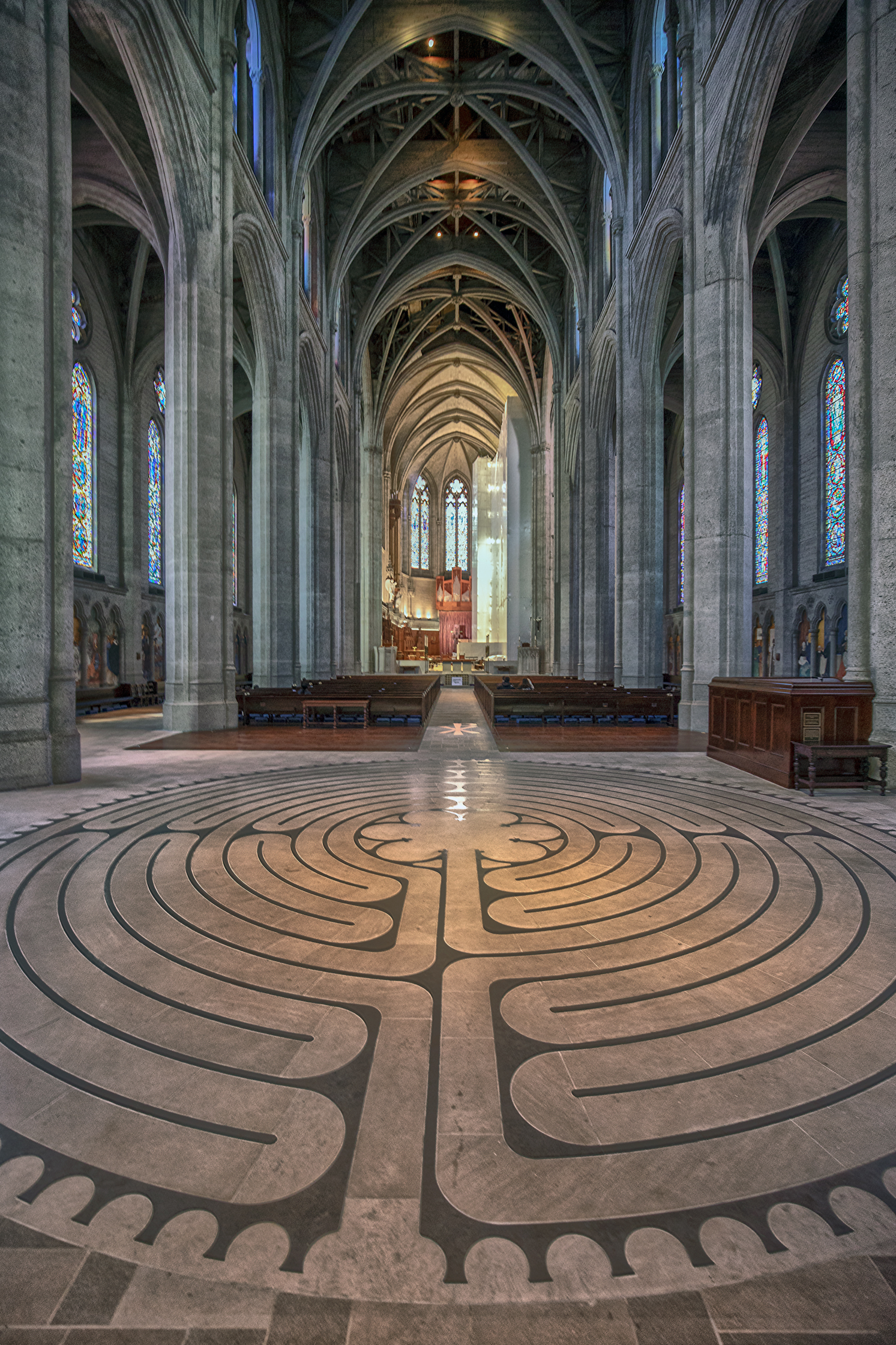
Labyrinth and interior (2018)

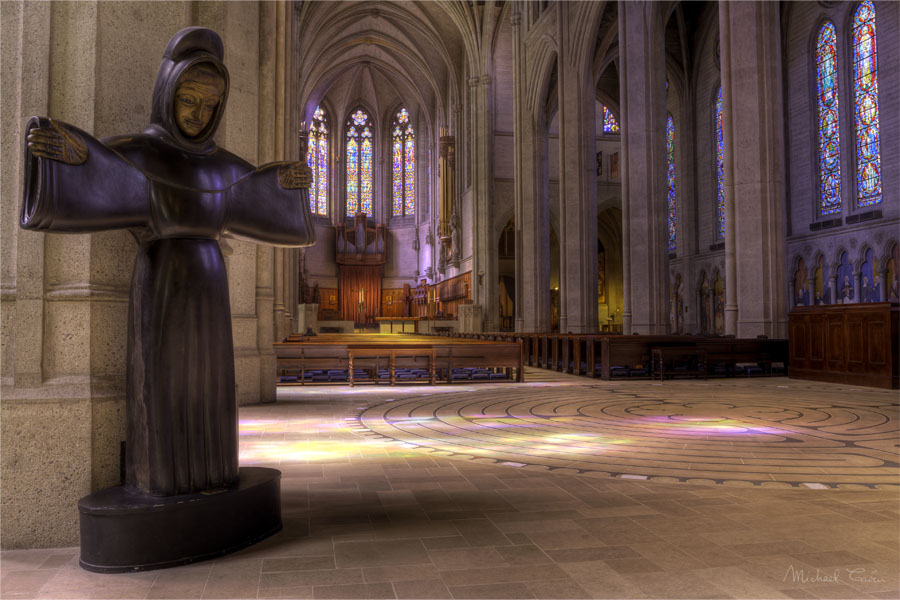
Beniamino Bufano's statue of Saint Francis

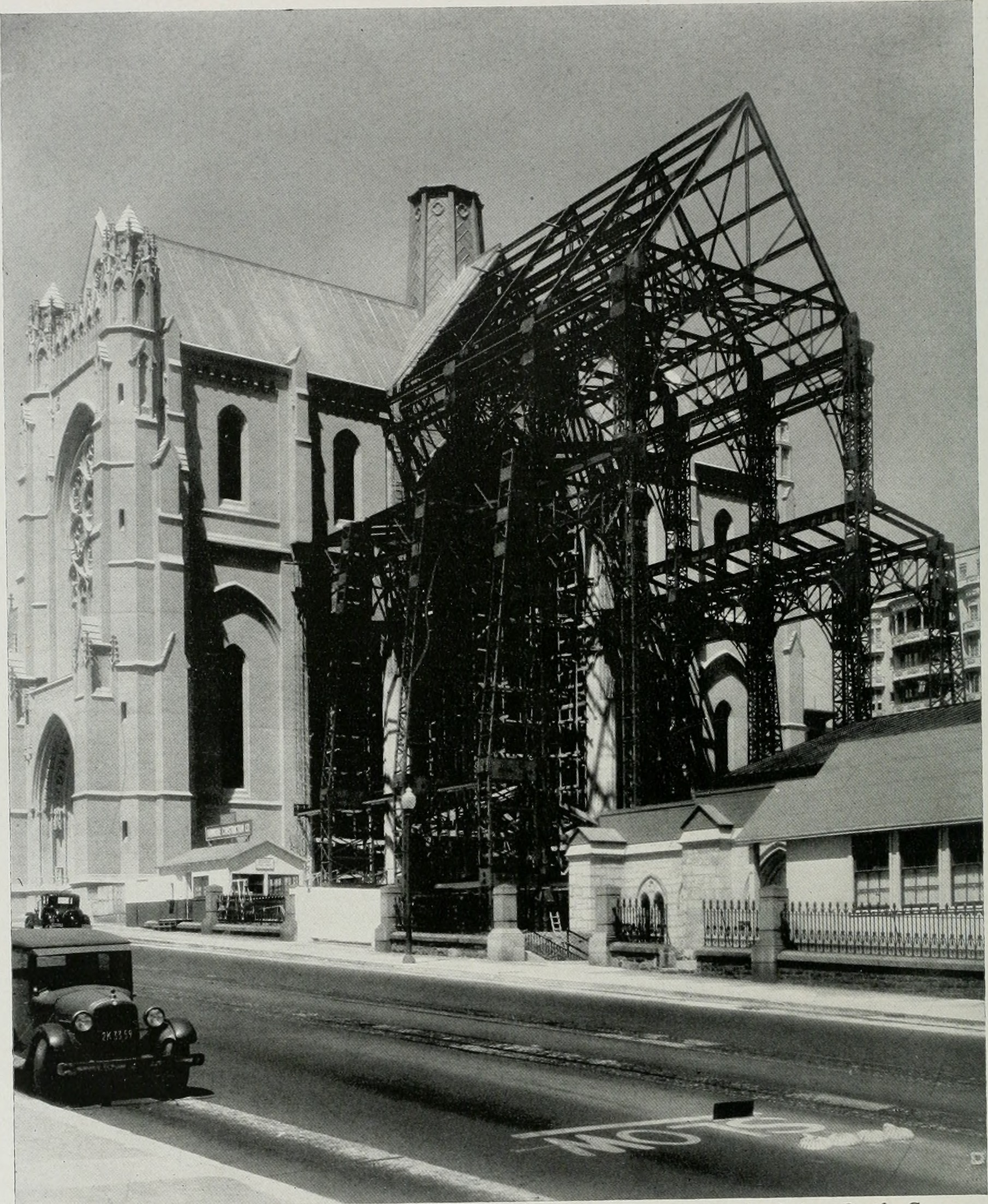
Structural steel (1934)

The initial plans were drawn up by George Bodley and redesigned by his partner Cecil Hare after Bodley's death; Hobart, acting as Hare's local agent, completed the design. The cathedral was built using ferroconcrete over four campaigns, lasting from 1928 to 1930, 1931–1934, 1939–1943, and 1961–1964. From 1914 to 1930, the congregation met in the present basement of the nave, now named the Founders Crypt. Services moved to the present Chapel of Grace in 1930, and by 1934, work on the Cathedral had been sufficiently completed to allow services to move there. Further work on the building was suspended by the Great Depression; the north tower was completed in 1943, followed by a long suspension in construction until 1960, when work on the final tower was started. The completion of the final tower in 1964 marked the end of structural construction, although much of the interior finish remains incomplete.

The overall plan and exterior of the French Gothic cathedral is inspired by cathedrals at Amiens, Paris, Beauvais, and Chartres. The interior features are inspired by the Aragon Palma Cathedral, and the Chapel of Grace is drawn from the Sainte-Chapelle. Overall, Grace Cathedral is 329 ft (100 m) long, 162 ft (49 m) wide at the transepts, with a central spire (flèche) rising 247 ft (75 m) above street level. The towers are 174 ft (53 m) above street level. The entry floor of the cathedral is itself 20 ft (6.1 m) above street level, and the sanctuary floor is 299.5 ft (91.3 m) above sea level. Under the original Bodley plans, Grace Cathedral would have been smaller and more square, 275 ft (84 m) long and 180 ft (55 m) wide.

=== Works by Jan Henryk De Rosen ===
Grace Cathedral has a significant collection of varied works by Jan Henryk De Rosen. Among these are a faux-tile mural behind the Chapel of Grace reredos from 1932, the mural in the Chapel of the Nativity's Adoration from 1946 showing the Holy Family with the magi and shepherds. At the donor's request, the original angels hovering above were removed by the artist, however constellations still mark their place. De Rosen also included a little image of his boyhood home in Warsaw in the mural. On a smaller scale, De Rosen painted exquisite panels for the original old high altar, which is now in the Chapel of St. Francis columbarium.

The most visible works of De Rosen in Grace Cathedral are the historical aisle murals that were painted in 1949 and 1950 and composed in a style blending elements of the early Italian masters Giotto and Mantegna.

=== Works by Antonio Sotomayor ===
Mural of Gold Rush San Francisco Antonio Sotomayor 1983 Grace Cathedral

Mural of 1906 Earthquake and Great Fire San Francisco Antonio Sotomayor Grace Cathedral 1983

Mural of 1945 United Nations Charter San Francisco Antonio Sotomayor Grace Cathedral 1983

In late 1981, the dean of the cathedral, David Gillespie, persuaded the Board of Trustees to embark on a beautification of Grace Cathedral as a memorial to a parishioner who had died in an accident in Marin County. The project provided for six large murals, three on each side of the interior nave of the cathedral. Together, the six large murals, each encompassing 5 bays divided by small pillars, would illustrate key moments in the history of San Francisco and life of the Anglican/Episcopalian religious community. These milestones were (1) 1849 California Gold Rush during which a small wooden chapel was erected and named Grace Chapel; (2) 1906 Great Earthquake and Fire during which Grace Church, a mostly stone structure, was destroyed; (3) 1945 Drafting and ratification in San Francisco of the Charter of the United Nations; (4) 1964 completion of the final phase of construction of the new Grace Cathedral (a structure made of pre-stressed concrete); (5) 1966 commencement of the new school year at Cathedral School for Boys; (6) 1981 the installation of the new Anglican/Episcopalian Bishop Myers at Grace Cathedral in the presence of leaders of the Orthodox, Roman Catholic, Protestant, and Jewish religions. Sotomayor included himself, his wife, friend and art critic Alexander Fried, family friend Robert Darden, the archivist of Grace Cathedral Michael Lampen, a student from Kenya employed by the Sotomayors, as well as cathedral benefactor Murphy and his two grown children, in the mural of the 1945 drafting and ratification of the Charter of the United Nations.

=== Ghiberti doors ===
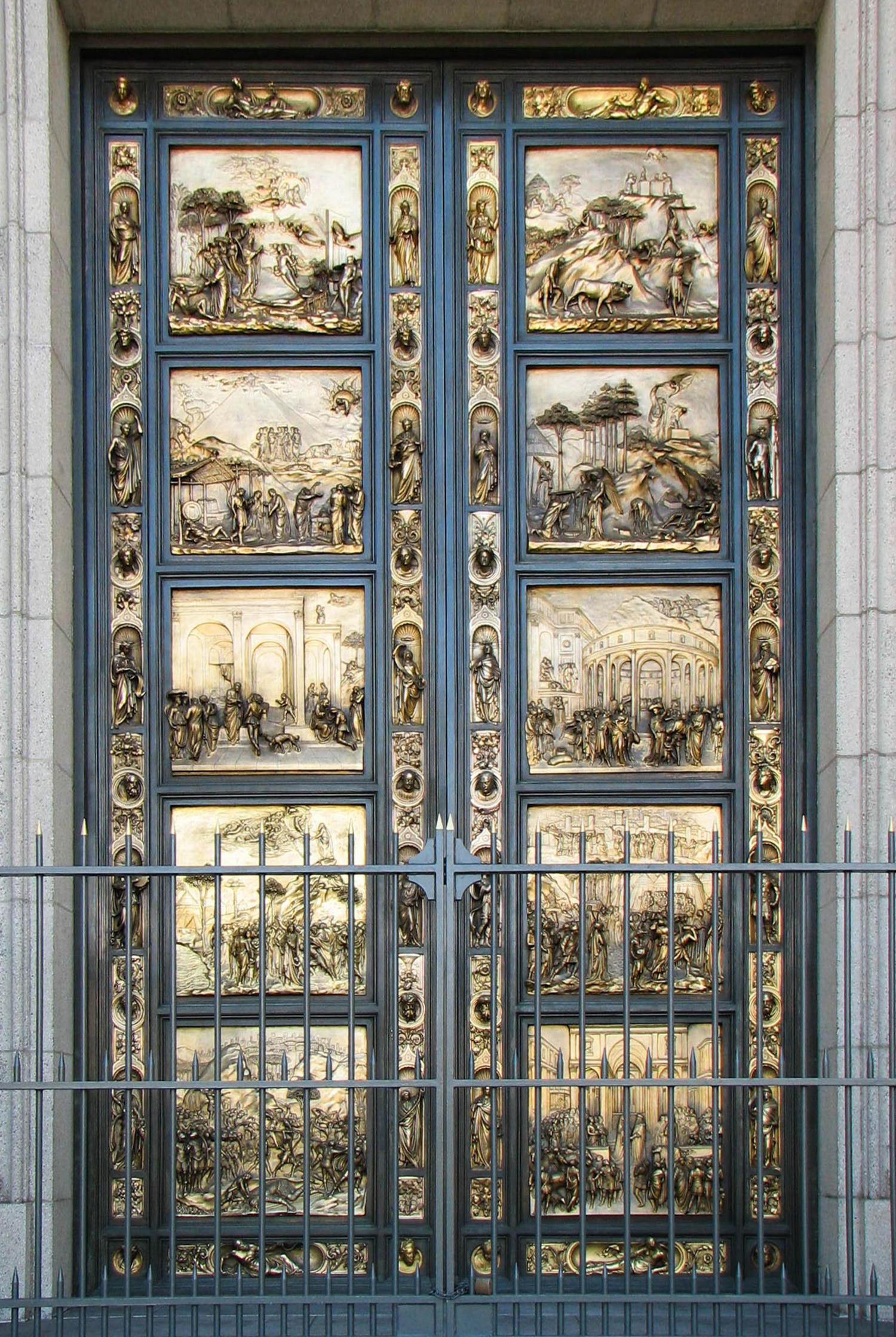
Ghiberti doors

The cathedral entrance has a large pair of doors, often called the "Ghiberti doors". They are reproductions of the doors of the Florence Baptistery by Lorenzo Ghiberti, also dubbed the "Gates of Paradise".

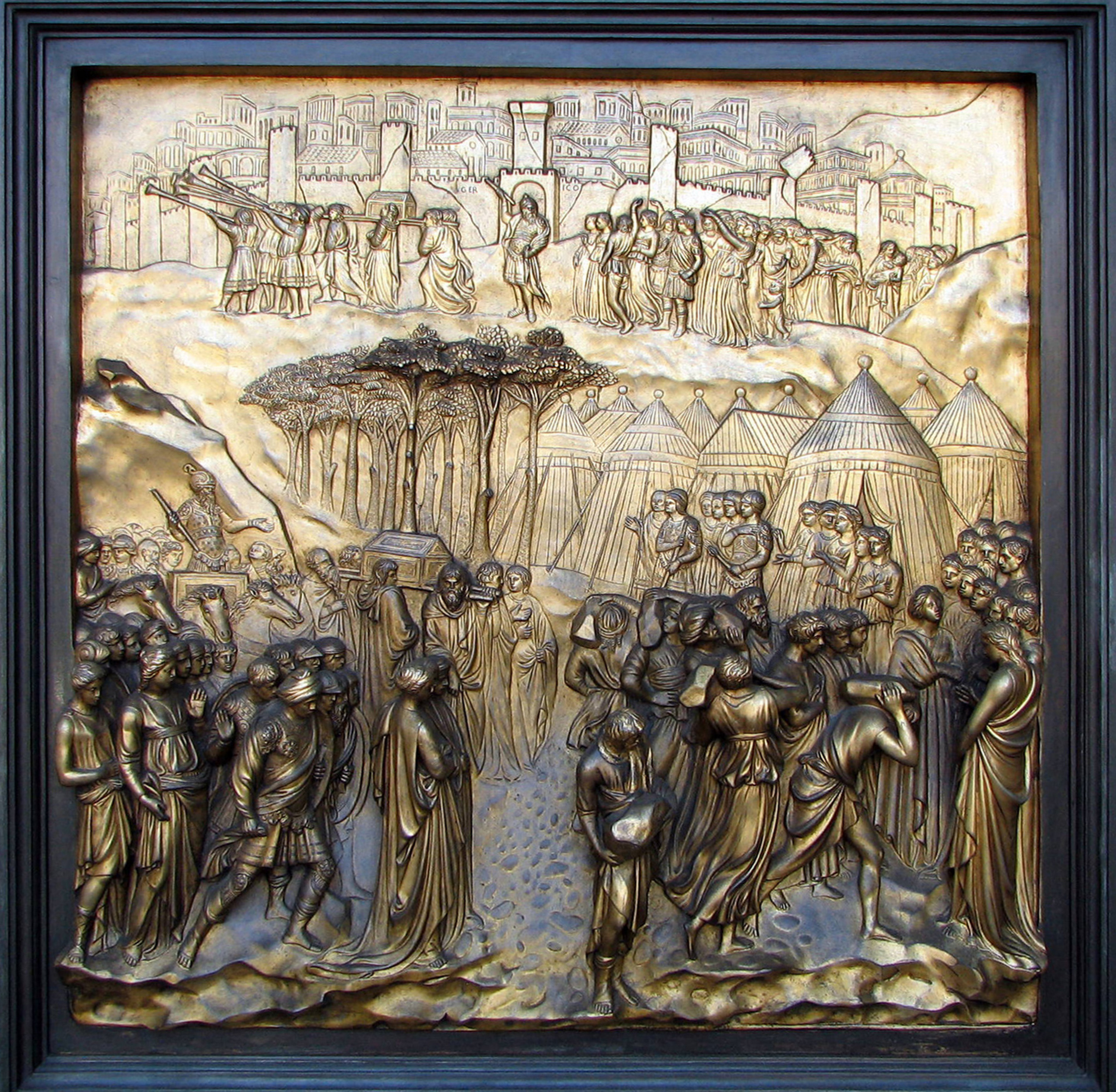
Detail of the doors

In 1943, the Nazi occupation government ordered the original doors to be removed from the Florence baptistery, along with other portable artworks, to protect them from bombing and possibly to give Hermann Göring a chance to add them to his collection. They were hidden in a disused railway tunnel until 1944, and latex casts were made after their rediscovery. The replica doors were cast in 1956 from molds of the original doors and were destined for a war memorial, but when financing for the memorial fell through, San Francisco philanthropist Charles D. Field bought these replicas, and they were then shipped to San Francisco and installed on the newly completed church in time for its official dedication in 1964.

The original Ghiberti doors are no longer installed in the baptistery as corrosion and weathering led conservators to decide that they must be preserved in a museum under a totally dry and controlled atmosphere. The doors now in the baptistery are more modern replicas installed in 1991.

=== Labyrinths ===
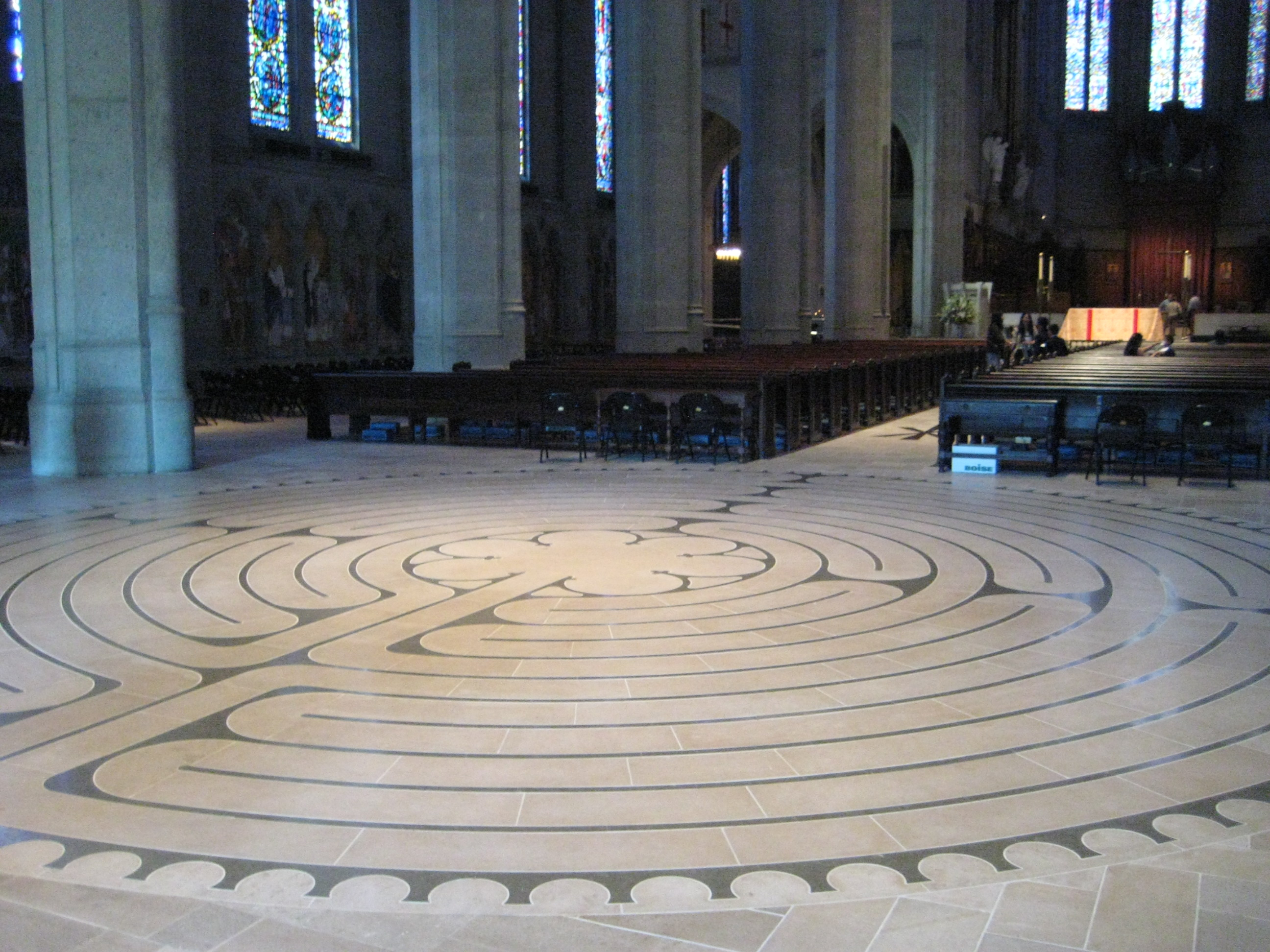
Labyrinth inside Grace Cathedral

Laid out on the floor of Grace Cathedral is a labyrinth based on the famous medieval labyrinth of The Cathedral of Our Lady of Chartres located in Chartres, France. There is also another labyrinth outside in the courtyard of the cathedral close.

=== Windows ===
Contained in the cathedral are 7,290 square feet (677 m^{2}) of stained glass windows by noted artists that depict over 1100 figures ranging from Adam and Eve to Albert Einstein. Thirty-two windows or window groups, dating from 1930 to 1966, were designed by American Charles Connick and his Boston studio. This includes the Chapel of Grace and baptistery window series that contains over 32,000 pieces of glass and covers nearly 833 square feet (77.4 m^{2}). The cathedral also contains 24 faceted windows by Gabriel Loire of Chartres, France, including the Human Endeavor series depicting John Glenn, Thurgood Marshall, Jane Addams, Robert Frost, and Einstein. Between 1995 and 1998, several of the cathedral's choir and aisle windows were restored by Reflection Studios of Emeryville, California.

=== Carillon ===
The carillon was the gift of Nathaniel T. Coulson, a San Francisco dentist and realtor who came from Lostwithiel in Cornwall. When Coulson first arrived in San Francisco in 1875, he found his way to Grace Church, which lacked a bell tower. Although a Methodist, he vowed to provide bells for the church and eventually spent his life savings to realize his dream and to erect the Singing (north) Tower to house them. The carillon consists of forty-four bronze bells, cast and tuned at the Gillett & Johnston Foundry of Croydon, England, in 1938. The bells arrived before the cathedral tower was completed, so they spent their first years on Treasure Island in San Francisco Bay as the centerpiece of the 1939–40 Golden Gate International Exposition. The carillon was first played from its Singing Tower home on Christmas Eve, 1940, and was formally dedicated in 1943. The bells have been rung to mark a number of important events, including D-Day and the centenary of the San Francisco cable car system.

=== Our Lady of the Flowers ===
by David LaChapelle

Chromogenic print. Anonymous gift, 2022

Inspired by the Virgin Mary, this work by the American photographer David LaChapelle celebrates faith and positivity in humanity. LaChapelle grew up during the AIDS epidemic and his early work was deeply influenced by ideas of life, death, and the metaphysical. The model is Haitian-born Guetcha Tondreau.

=== Cathedral School for Boys ===
In 1957, the Cathedral School for Boys was opened in the cathedral's bell towers. It was founded by the then dean, Julian Bartlett, in response to parents seeking an alternative to the other private schools in San Francisco. A permanent building was opened in June 1965, forming part of the cathedral close. Thanks in part to the presence of the school, the cathedral has one of only a handful of remaining Episcopal men and boys cathedral choirs, the Grace Cathedral Choir of Men and Boys; the 24 boys of the choir attend the Cathedral School for Boys, while the 12 men are a professional ensemble.

== In popular culture ==
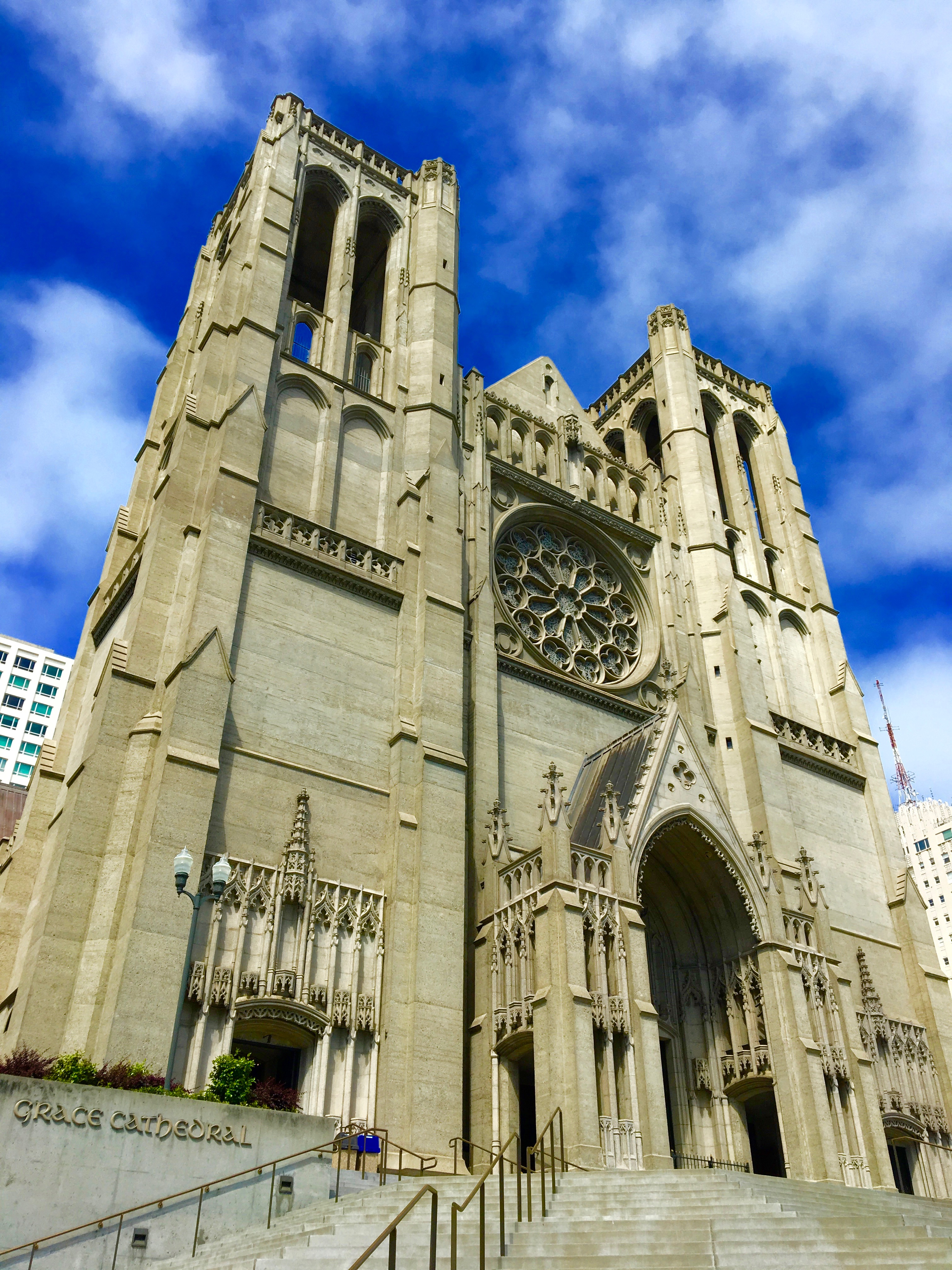
Grace Cathedral front façade

Photographer Ansel Adams produced a series of photographs of the incomplete cathedral in 1935.

Jazz pianist Vince Guaraldi composed and recorded a Mass for jazz trio and choir. The performance at the cathedral on May 21, 1965, was released as At Grace Cathedral.

Duke Ellington performed his televised Concert of Sacred Music at the cathedral on September 26, 1965.

Art Garfunkel's 1973 solo album Angel Clare was recorded at Grace Cathedral.

"Grace Cathedral Park" is the first song on Red House Painters' 1993 self-titled album, their second.

"Grace Cathedral Hill" is track 7 on the Decemberists' 2003 Castaways and Cutouts album. It recounts a New Year's Eve experience in which the singer and his sullen (presumably grieving) female companion visit the church to light candles.

Grace Cathedral has appeared in a number of feature films. Alfred Hitchcock filmed an abduction scene for his final film, Family Plot, in the cathedral in 1975. Some other film appearances include The Pleasure of His Company (1961), Bullitt (1968), Time After Time (1979), Bicentennial Man (1999), Milk (2008), and Venom: Let There Be Carnage (2021). The short epilogue of the 1962 film How the West Was Won shows sweeping views of how the West had evolved into its modern self, including an aerial shot of San Francisco that flies directly over Grace Cathedral, showing some of its ongoing construction.

Armistead Maupin's 1978–2014 Tales of the City book series has an Episcopal cannibal cult operating out of Grace Cathedral as one of its sub-plots. In the TV adaptation, Maupin plays a cameo role as a priest of Grace Cathedral, but the cathedral interiors were actually filmed in Montreal.

Fort Point Beer Company's beer can for their KSA beer features a graphic illustration of Grace Cathedral.

== List of deans ==
As of 2020 Grace Cathedral has had nine deans, the chief resident cleric of the cathedral rector of the parish.

- J. Wilmer Gresham (1928–1939)
- Thomas Wright (1941–1943)
- Bernard Lovgren (1946–1951)
- C. Julian Bartlett (1956–1975)
- Stanley Rodgers (1975–1977)
- David Gillespie (1978–1985)
- Alan Jones (1985–2009)
- Jane Shaw (2010–2014)
- Malcolm Clemens Young (2015–present)

Dean Alan Jones, who retired in 2009, had also served as the moderator of The Forum at Grace Cathedral. Dean Jane Shaw left Grace Cathedral in September 2014 to become Dean for Religious Life and Professor of Religious Studies at Stanford University.

== See also ==
- List of the Episcopal cathedrals of the United States
- List of cathedrals in the United States
