= Vido (disambiguation) =

Vido is an island in Greece.

Vido or VIDO may also refer to:

== People ==
- Vido (surname)
- Vido Musso, American jazz musician

== Other uses ==
- Vaccine and Infectious Disease Organization (VIDO)
