= National Association of Episcopal Schools =

Membership organization

The National Association of Episcopal Schools (NAES) is a membership organization, serving the approximately 1200 pre-collegiate schools and early childhood education programs in the United States.

Membership is restricted to schools owned, operated, or sponsored by bodies of the Episcopal Church, or otherwise operating "under the jurisdiction or operating with the knowledge and consent of the bishop of the diocese in which they are located.".

A voluntary membership organization, NAES does not accredit, oversee, or govern any of its member schools, and "neither reports to nor is governed by the General Convention of the Episcopal Church.".
