= Julia Kunin =

American sculpture and video artist

Julia Kunin is an American sculpture and video artist. She was born in Vermont, and lives and works in Brooklyn, New York. Her work is inspired by organic forms, undersea creatures, and interior spaces, with a focus on the female body. Her work has included ceramic art with luster glazes. She graduated from Rutgers University (M.F.A.) in 1993 and Wellesley College (B.A.) in 1984, and attended the Skowhegan School of Painting and Sculpture. Her work has been featured in ARTnews, House and Garden, The Brooklyn Rail, and in Harmony Hammond's book Lesbian Art in America (Rizzoli, 2000).

Kunin is the recipient of many honors and awards, including a Fulbright in 2013. She has participated in many artist residencies and fellowship programs, including Macdowell Colony in Peterborough, NH; the Marie Walsh Sharpe Art Foundation, in New York state; and Yaddo, in Saratoga Springs, NY.

Kunin has been featured in numerous exhibits nationally and internationally, with shows in Mother Gallery in NYC in 2022 with Yevgeniya Baras, a group show at LACMA in Los Angeles in 2022, as well as in Miami at the Mindy Solomon Gallery in 2022. She has had solo shows at the McClain Gallery in Houston in 2021, in NYC in 2020 at the Kate Werble Gallery and at Sandra Gering Inc in 2015, Barry Whistler Gallery in Dallas in 2013, Greenberg Van Doren in 2012, and the Deutsches Leder Museum in Offenbach, Germany in 2002. She had a two-person exhibition with Jackie Gendel at Jeff Bailey Gallery in 2014.
