= Alfredo De Vido =

American architect and author (1932–2025)

Alfredo De Vido (March 19, 1932 – March 19, 2025) was an American architect and author in New York City. He is known for his residential projects, mostly constructed on the East Coast of the United States.

== Life and career ==
Born in Brooklyn to Edoardo and Maria De Vido, who had immigrated from Italy several years previously, De Vido studied at Carnegie Tech and Princeton University, including under Buckminster Fuller. His education was interrupted by service in the U.S. Navy, stationed at Atsugi Naval Air Station in Japan, and after completing his graduate degree, he worked for Walter Gropius in Rome, before returning to New York to join MacFadyen and Knowles. Eventually, that partnership split up, and De Vido joined MacFadyen as a partner. When MacFadyen retired, the firm continued as Alfredo De Vido & Associates.

His work also includes the 1993 renovation of the Queens Theatre in the Park, the theater that is now Filene Center at Wolf Trap National Park for the Performing Arts in Washington, D.C., and the Mann Center for the Performing Arts (formerly Robin Hood Dell West) in Philadelphia.

Musician Mitch Miller hired him for the Green Briar development in the town of Somers, New York. De Vido's design work was part of the Weekend Utopia: The Modern Beach House on Eastern Long Island, 1960-1973, exhibition at Guild Hall in East Hampton. The book Alfredo De Vido (Ten Houses) by Michael J. Crosbie, Richard J. Wertheimer highlights some of his residential work.

De Vido was the architect for the renovation of the circular Theaterama at Queens Theatre in Park, originally part of Philip Johnson's New York State Pavilion for the 1964 World's Fair. The theatre was once decorated with the artworks including those of Andy Warhol and Robert Indiana. The circular theater was converted according to De Vido's plans into the 476-seat Queens Theater in the Park, a wonderful success according to Borough President Claire Shulman of Queens, who said she was an attendee at the 1939 World's Fair (held at the same site) as a little girl.

His addition of four floors to the Brinckerhoff Carriage House in 1992, a victorian architecture building, was somewhat controversial for destroying the mansard roof. The work was done for the Allen-Stevenson School.

De Vido died on March 19, 2025, his 93rd birthday.

== Projects ==
- Green Briar, a 237 home development in the town of Somers, New York, in Westchester
- House in Delhi, New York
- 54 Willow Street (design), a four-story residence
- Sametz House in Garrison, New York
- Solar House Plan No. 3
- Community Church of Astoria addition, with David Cook
- Silver Sands Park renovation plan
- Minton House (1982/1983)
- Wirth House (1975)
- Aksen House (1978/1979) Stamford, CT (11)
- Matthews House (East Hampton) (1967), East Hampton
- Duffy House, Wainscott New York (1991)
- De Vido House (1997), East Hampton
- Ross House (East Hampton) (1961), East Hampton for Hal Ross
- 3 White Pine Road (1986), East Hampton
- Ferguson House (Pound Ridge) (1983), Pound Ridge
- Boyle House (1982), Bernardsville, New Jersey
- David Allan House (1992), Saddle River, New Jersey
- Jonathan's Landing design (1985) Brooklyn, New York
- Haldinger House (1973) Winhall, Vermont
- Rafferty House (1973)
- Columbia County House (1978)
- Megerle House (1978) North Castle, New York, for Karl Mergerle

== Publications ==
- Alfredo De Vido: Selected and Current Works by Alfredo De Vido, Stephen Dobney Images Publishing, 1998 – 256 pages

A collection of residential projects that is part of the 'Master Architect Series'.

- Alfredo De Vido: Designing Your Client's House: An Architect's Guide to Meeting Design Goals and Budgets, Watson-Guptill, 1990 – 208 pages
- Alfredo De Vido: Innovative Management Techniques: For Architectural Design and Construction, Whitney Library of Design, 1984 – 207 pages

Features 45 case studies of houses, stores, and public buildings, meant to provide a valuable example of skillful management.

- Alfredo De Vido: House Design : Art and Practice, John Wiley & Sons, Inc., 1996 – 256 pages

House Design: Art and Practice is a step-by-step overview of all the nuts-and-bolts, human factors, and numerous intangibles that must be successfully orchestrated to produce a good house.

- Alfredo De Vido: Ten Houses, Rockport Publishers, 1998 – 108 pages

The Ten Houses series makes the most important elements of architectural design available to a large and varied audience. Each volume presents one of the world's foremost architects and features 10 of his or her finest residential works-including presentation, drawings, sketches, and working drawings.
