= South Worthington Historic District =

Historic district in Massachusetts, United States

- U.S. National Register of Historic Places
- U.S. Historic district
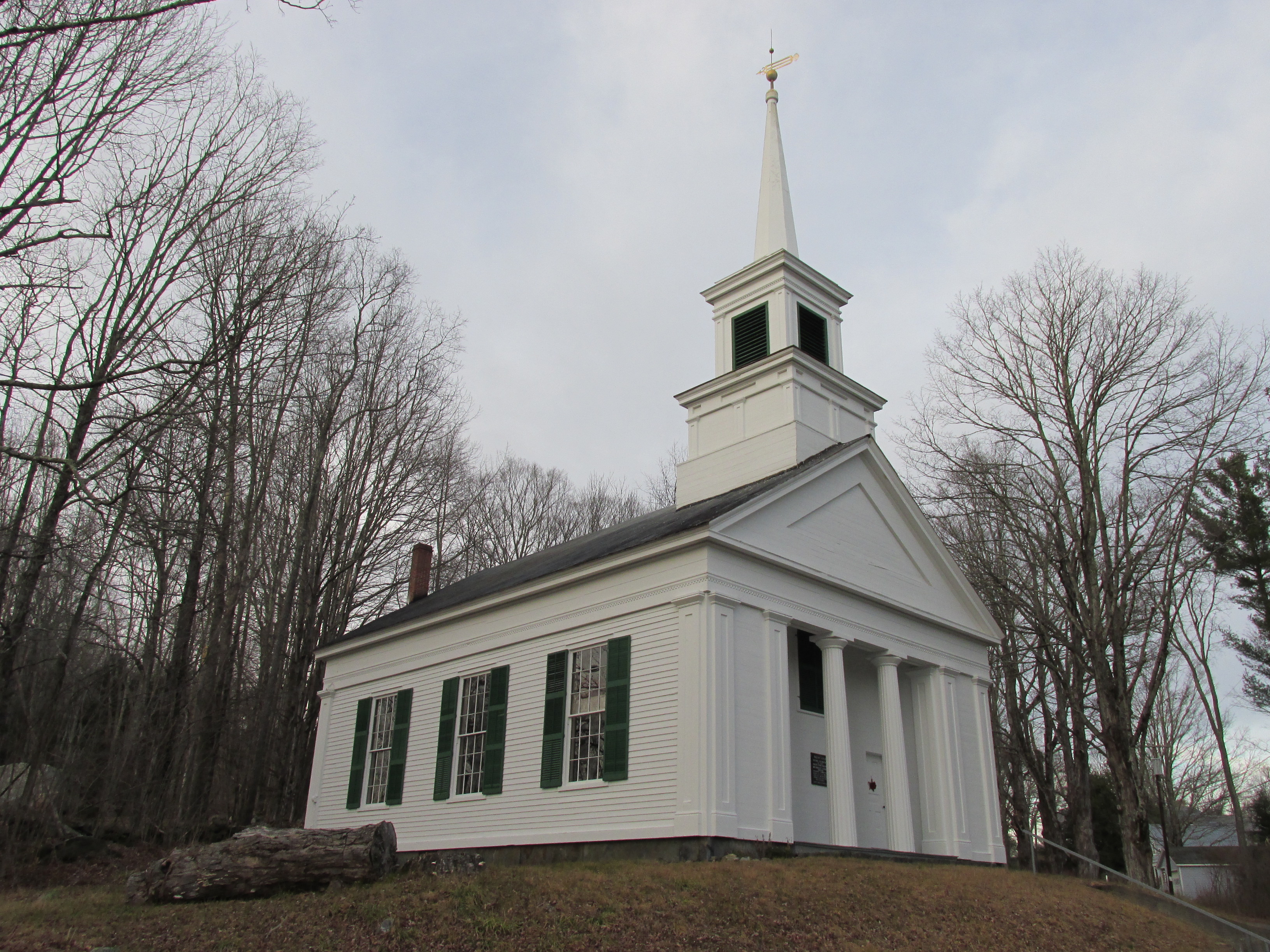
- South Worthington Methodist Church

- Location within Massachusetts Location within the United States
- Location: Worthington, Massachusetts
- Coordinates: 42°20′47″N 72°53′36″W
- Architectural style: Federal, Mid 19th Century Revival
- NRHP reference No.: 05000935
- Added to NRHP: September 1, 2005

The South Worthington Historic District is a historic district encompassing the formerly industrial, but now rural, village of South Worthington, Massachusetts. The village is centered on the junction of Huntington Road (Massachusetts Route 112), Ireland Street, and Thrasher Hill Road. The district extends along Ireland Road as far as Conwell Road, and one contributing element, the dam which impounds Little Galilee Pond, extends into neighboring Chesterfield. The area had a number of small mills along the banks of the Little River, a tributary of the Westfield River, but only one complex, the Theron Higgins Mill on South Worthington Road, has survived from the 19th century. Most of the buildings in the district are residences dating to the 19th century; also included are three churches, including the particularly elegant Greek Revival South Worthington Methodist Church (1848). The district was added to the National Register of Historic Places in 2005.

The South Worthington area first developed as a modest agricultural area in the 1760s. A falls in the Little River proved a good location for a sawmill, which was standing by 1794, and followed by a grist mill in 1812. The village flourished as a service center for the local farmers, and additional mills survived for a time in the 19th century, one of which was used to manufacture window blinds. The first church was built in 1828; the building, which still stands, was later used as a general store and as a school, after the present Greek Revival church was built. The village also achieved some notice as the birthplace and summer home of Russell Conwell (1843-1925), a famous Baptist minister and writer who founded Temple University. Conwell's summer stays in the house of his youth brought visitors to the community. Conwell's association with the village is commemorated by boulder with a plaque mounted on it near that house, 42 Conwell Road.

== See also ==
- National Register of Historic Places listings in Hampshire County, Massachusetts
