= Christ Church =

Christ Church may refer to:

== Churches in Australia ==
=== New South Wales ===
- Christ Church, Bong Bong
- Christ Church, Lavender Bay
- Christ Church, Queanbeyan
- Christ Church, Rouse Hill, Sydney
- Christ Church St Laurence, Sydney
- Christ Church Anglican Church, Bungonia
- Christ Church Anglican Church, Springwood
- Christ Church Cathedral, Grafton
- Christ Church Cathedral, Newcastle

=== Northern Territory ===
- Christ Church Cathedral, of the Anglican Diocese of the Northern Territory, Darwin

=== Queensland ===
- Christ Church, Childers
- Christ Church, Milton, Brisbane
- Christ Church, Tingalpa
- Christ Church Anglican Church, St Lawrence

=== South Australia ===
- Christ Church, North Adelaide

=== Victoria ===
- Christ Church, Birregurra
- Christ Church, Brunswick, Melbourne
- Christ Church, Geelong
- Christ Church, Hamilton
- Christ Church, Hawthorn, Melbourne
- Christ Church, South Yarra, Melbourne

=== Tasmania ===
- Christ Church, Launceston

== Churches in Canada ==
- Christ Church, Amherstburg, Ontario
- Christ Church, Maugerville, a National Historic Site of Canada in New Brunswick
- Christ Church Cathedral (Montreal), Quebec
- Christ Church Royal Chapel, Deseronto, Ontario

== Churches in India ==
- Christ Church, Shimla
- Christ Church Anglo-Indian Higher Secondary School, Chennai
- Christ Church School, Mumbai
- Christ Church, Hyderabad
- Christ Church, Mhow

== Churches in Ireland ==
- Christ Church, Bray
- Christ Church Cathedral, Dublin

== Churches in Israel ==
- Christ Church, Jerusalem
- Christ Church, Nazareth

== Churches in New Zealand ==
- Christ Church, Russell, the oldest extant church in New Zealand
- Christ Church, Taita, Lower Hutt

== Churches in the United Kingdom and Crown colonies ==
=== England ===
- Christ Church, Adlington, Lancashire
- Christ Church, Appleton-le-Moors, North Yorkshire
- Christ Church Barnet
- Christ Church, Brixton Road, London
- Christ Church, Alsager, Cheshire
- Christ Church, Ashford, Kent
- Christ Church, Bacup, Lancashire
- Christ Church, Barnton, Cheshire
- Christ Church, Bath, Somerset
- Christ Church, Birkenhead, Merseyside
- Christ Church, Birmingham
- Christ Church, Blakenall Heath, Walsall, West Midlands
- Christ Church, Bolton-le-Sands, Lancashire
- Christ Church, Bradford-on-Avon, Wiltshire
- Christ Church, Bristol (also known as Christ Church with St Ewen)
- Christ Church Cathedral Priory, former name of Canterbury Cathedral
- Christ Church, Carnforth, Lancashire
- Christ Church, Chatburn, Lancashire
- Christ Church, Chelsea, London
- Christ Church, Chester, Cheshire
- Christ Church, Clifton Down, Bristol
- Christ Church, Cockfosters, London
- Christ Church, Coseley, West Midlands
- Christ Church, Croft, Cheshire
- Christ Church, Crowton, Cheshire
- Christ Church, Dore, Dore, South Yorkshire
- Christ the Saviour Church, Ealing, London, formerly Christ Church, Ealing
- Christ Church, East Sheen, London
- Christ Church, Eaton, Cheshire
- Christ Church, Ellesmere Port, Cheshire
- Christ Church, Fenton, Staffordshire
- Christ Church, Fairwarp, Maresfield, East Sussex
- Christ Church, Freemantle, Southampton
- Christ Church, Fulwood, Preston, Lancashire
- Christ Church, Fulwood, Sheffield
- Christ Church, Gipsy Hill, Lambeth, London
- Christ Church, Glasson, Lancashire
- Christ Church, Gleadless, Gleadless, Sheffield
- Christ Church Greyfriars, London (also known as Christ Church Newgate)
- Christ Church, Hackenthorpe, Sheffield
- Christ Church, Hampstead, London
- Christ Church, Hartlepool, County Durham (now Hartlepool Art Gallery)
- Christ Church, Hastings (disambiguation)
- Christ Church, Heaton Norris, Greater Manchester
- Christ Church, Higher Bebington, Merseyside
- Christchurch, Ilkley, West Yorkshire
- Christ Church, Ince-in-Makerfield, Greater Manchester
- Christ Church, Kensington, Liverpool
- Christ Church, Kensington, London
- Christ Church, Kilndown, Kent
- Christ Church, Lambeth, London
- Christ Church, Lancaster, Lancashire
- Christ Church, Lichfield, Staffordshire
- Christ Church, Litton, Litton, Derbyshire
- Christ Church, Macclesfield, Cheshire
- Christ Church, Marylebone, Westminster
- Christ Church, Moss Side, Manchester
- Christ Church, Nelson, Lancashire
- Christ Church, New Malden, London
- Christ Church, North Shields, Tyne and Wear
- Christ Church, Ore, Hastings, East Sussex
- Christ Church, Ottershaw, Surrey
- Christ Church, Over Wyresdale, Lancashire
- Christ Church, Pennington, Manchester
- Christ Church, Pitsmoor, Sheffield
- Christ Church, Port Sunlight, Merseyside
- Christ (Highfield) Church, Portswood, Southampton
- Christ Church, Reading, Berkshire
- Christ Church, St Leonards-on-Sea, East Sussex
- Christ Church, Sandown, Isle of Wight
- Christ Church, Shamley Green, Surrey
- Christ Church, Snodland, Kent
- Christ Church, Southwark, London
- Christ Church, Spitalfields, London
- Christ Church, Thornton, Lancashire
- Christ Church, Timperley, Greater Manchester
- Christ Church, Totland, Isle of Wight
- Christ Church, Toxteth Park, Liverpool
- Christ Church, Tunstall, Staffordshire
- Christ Church, Wadsley Bridge, Wadsley Bridge, Sheffield
- Christ Church, Walmsley, Bolton, Greater Manchester
- Christ Church, Ware, Hertfordshire
- Christ Church, Warminster, Wilts
- Christ Church, Wesham, Lancashire
- Christ Church, Westbourne, Dorset
- Christ Church, Westerdale, North Yorkshire
- Christ Church, Weston Point, Runcorn, Cheshire
- Christ Church, Wharton, Winsford, Cheshire
- Christ Church, Wheelock, Cheshire
- Christ Church, Willaston, Cheshire
- Christ Church, Winchester, Hampshire
- Christ Church, Wolverhampton

=== Wales ===
- Christ Church, Bala, Gwynedd
- Christ Church, Bryn-y-Maen, Colwyn Bay, Denbighshire
- Christ Church, Rossett, Denbighshire

=== Isle of Man ===
- Christ Church, Laxey, one of Isle of Man's Registered Buildings

== Churches in the United States ==
=== California ===
- Old North Church (Sierra Madre, California), now called Christ Church Sierra Madre, an historic landmark

=== Connecticut ===
- Christ Church (New Haven)

=== Delaware ===
- Christ Church, Broad Creek, Laurel
- Christ Church, Christiana Hundred, Greenville
- Christ Church, Delaware City
- Christ Church, Dover
- Christ Church, Milford, Delaware

=== Florida ===
- Christ Church (Episcopal), Fort Meade, Florida
- Old Christ Church (Pensacola, Florida)

=== Georgia ===
- Christ Church (Macon, Georgia)
- Christ Church (Savannah, Georgia), a part of the Savannah Historic District
- Christ Church Anglican (Savannah, Georgia)
- Christ Church (St. Simons, Georgia)

=== Idaho ===
- Christ Church (Moscow, Idaho)

=== Iowa ===
- Christ Episcopal Church (Burlington, Iowa)

=== Illinois ===
- Christ Reformed Episcopal Church (Chicago)

=== Maine ===
- Christ Church (Dark Harbor, Maine)

=== Maryland ===
- Christ Church (Accokeek, Maryland)
- Christ Episcopal Church and Cemetery (Cambridge, Maryland)
- Christ Church (Easton, Maryland)
- Christ Church Guilford
- Christ Church (Ironsides, Maryland)
- Christ Church (Owensville, Maryland)
- Christ Church (Port Republic, Maryland)
- Christ Church (Stevensville, Maryland)

=== Massachusetts ===
- Old North Church, Boston (officially "Christ Church in the City of Boston"), a National Historic Landmark
- Christ Church (Hyde Park, Boston)
- Christ Church (Cambridge, Massachusetts), a National Historic Landmark
- Christ Church (Quincy, Massachusetts)
- Christ Episcopal Church (Waltham, Massachusetts)

=== Michigan ===
- Christ Church Cranbrook
- Christ Church Detroit
- Christ Church Chapel, Grosse Pointe

=== Minnesota ===
- Christ Church Lutheran (Minneapolis, Minnesota), a National Historic Landmark

=== Mississippi ===
- Christ Church (Church Hill, Mississippi)
- Christ Church (Vicksburg, Mississippi), a landmark in Warren County, Mississippi

=== New Hampshire ===
- Christ Church, Exeter, New Hampshire

=== New Jersey ===
- Christ Church (Middletown, New Jersey)
- Christ Church, New Brunswick, New Jersey
- Christ Church, Newton
- Christ Church (Episcopal), Shrewsbury
- Christ Church USA, Montclair & Rockaway

=== New York ===
- Christ Church (Binghamton, New York)
- Christ Church (Greenville, Greene County, New York), listed on the NRHP for Greene County
- Christ Church (Middletown, New York)
- Christ Church (Oyster Bay, New York)
- Christ Church (Rochester, New York)
- Christ Church (Sparkill, New York)
- Christ Episcopal Church (Tarrytown, New York)
- Christ Church Lutheran (New York City)
- Old Christ Church Lutheran (New York City)
- Christ Church United Methodist, Manhattan, New York City
- Christ Church (Bronx)

=== North Carolina ===
- Christ Episcopal Church and Parish House (New Bern, North Carolina)
- Christ Episcopal Church (Raleigh, North Carolina)

=== Pennsylvania ===
- Christ Church (Brownsville, Pennsylvania), an, historic district contributing property
- Christ Church, Philadelphia, a National Historic Landmark
- Christ Memorial Reformed Episcopal Church, Philadelphia

=== South Carolina ===
- Christ Church (Florence, South Carolina)
- Christ Church (Greenville, South Carolina)
- Christ Church (Mount Pleasant, South Carolina)

=== Tennessee ===
- Christ Church (Nashville, Tennessee)

=== Texas ===
- Christ Church (Houston, Texas)

=== Vermont ===
- Christ Church (Guilford, Vermont)

=== Virginia ===
- Christ Church (Alexandria, Virginia), a National Historic Landmark
- Christ Church (Lancaster County, Virginia), a National Historic Landmark; see also the community listed below
- Christ Church (Norfolk, Virginia)
- Christ Church (Saluda, Virginia)

=== Washington, D.C. ===
- Christ Church (Georgetown, Washington, D.C.)
- Christ Church, Washington Parish

== Churches elsewhere ==
- Christ Church, Vienna, Austria
- Christ Church Parish Church, Barbados
- Christ Church, Cangxia, China
- Christ Church, Copenhagen, Denmark
- Christ Church, Lille, France
- German Speaking Protestant Congregation in Iran or Christ Church in Tehran, Iran
- Christ Church, Yokohama, Japan
- Christuskirche, Mainz, Germany
- Christ Church, Malacca, Malaysia
- Christ Church, Windhoek, Namibia
- Christ Church, Rawalpindi, Pakistan
- Christ Church, Galkissa, Sri Lanka
- Christ Church Cathedral, Zanzibar, Tanzania
- Christ Church Bangkok, Thailand
- Christ Church, Bergen, Norway

== Educational institutions ==
- Christ Church, Oxford, a constituent college of the University of Oxford, UK, and the associated cathedral
- Canterbury Christ Church University, Kent, England
- Christ Church Grammar School, Perth, Western Australia
- Christ Church Secondary School, Singapore
- Christ Church Episcopal School, Greenville, South Carolina, U.S.
- Christ Church College (disambiguation)
- Christ Church Primary School, a primary school of Wolverhampton, England

== Other uses ==
- "Christ Church" (song), by The Dubliners
- Christ Church, Barbados, a civil parish
- Christ Church Nichola Town Parish, a civil parish in the West Indies
- Christ Church, Virginia, a community in Lancaster County, see also the church listed above

== See also ==
- Christ Cathedral (disambiguation)
- Christ Chapel (disambiguation)
- Christ Church, Cambridge (disambiguation)
- Christ Church Cathedral (disambiguation)
- Christ Episcopal Church (disambiguation)
- Christchurch (disambiguation)
- Christian Church (disambiguation)
- Christ's Church (disambiguation)
- Christuskirche (disambiguation)
- Church of Christ (disambiguation)
- Kirk Christ, Lezayre and Kirk Christ, Rushen, churches and their historic parishes, Isle of Man
