= Christchurch (disambiguation) =

Christchurch is the largest city in the South Island of New Zealand.

Christchurch may also refer to:

== Places ==
=== New Zealand ===
- Christchurch, New Zealand
  - Christchurch (New Zealand electorate), a former electorate in New Zealand, also called Town (or City) of Christchurch
  - Christchurch Central, the current electorate of Christchurch in New Zealand
  - Christchurch mosque shootings, a 2019 terrorist attack in Christchurch, New Zealand

=== United Kingdom ===
- Christchurch, Cambridgeshire, in England
- Christchurch, Dorset, town on the south coast of England
  - RAF Christchurch, a WW II airfield near the town
  - Christchurch (UK Parliament constituency), England, centred on the town
  - Christchurch (Dorset) railway station, a railway station serving the town
- Christchurch, Gloucestershire, hamlet in the west of the Forest of Dean, Gloucestershire, England
- Christchurch, Newport, in Wales
- Christchurch Mansion, a stately home in Ipswich, Suffolk
  - Christchurch Park, a park surrounding Christchurch Mansion
- Southwark Christchurch, England

=== Other countries ===
- Christchurch, Virginia, United States
- Christ Church, Barbados, Barbados

== Educational institutions ==
- Canterbury Christ Church University
- Christchurch School, Christchurch, Virginia, U.S.
- Christchurch Boys' High School, Christchurch, New Zealand
- Christchurch Girls' High School, Christchurch, New Zealand
- Christ Church, Oxford
- University of Otago Christchurch School of Medicine, one of three medical schools of University of Otago, New Zealand
- Christchurch Anglo-Indian Higher Secondary School, Christchurch, Chennai, India

== Sports teams ==
- Christchurch F.C., England
- Christchurch United, New Zealand
- Christchurch Technical, New Zealand
- Christchurch High School Old Boys, New Zealand

== Other uses ==
- Christchurch-Campbell, an automobile made in 1922
- ChristChurch London, an evangelic church in London, England
- Christchurch, Ilkley, a church in West Yorkshire, England

== See also ==
- History of Christchurch (disambiguation)
- Christ Church (disambiguation)
- Christ Church Cathedral (disambiguation)
- Church of Christ
- Christian Church (disambiguation)
- Christchurch railway station (disambiguation)
