= Christ College =

Christ College may refer to:

- Christ College (Sydney), Australia
- Christ College (University of Tasmania), Australia
- Christ College, Irinjalakuda, India
- Christ College, Brecon, Wales, United Kingdom
- Christ College, now Concordia University Irvine, California, United States
- Christ College, Valparaiso University, Indiana, United States

== See also ==
- Christ's College (disambiguation)
- Christ Church College (disambiguation)
- Christ University, Bengaluru, India
