= Dean of Christ Church =

Dean of Christ Church may refer to:

- Dean of Christ Church, Oxford
- Dean of Christ Church Cathedral, Dublin
- Dean of ChristChurch Cathedral, Christchurch, New Zealand

== See also ==
- Christ Church Cathedral (disambiguation)
