= Christchurch City (disambiguation) =

Christchurch City may refer to:

- Christchurch City (district), the area covered by Christchurch City Council, the local government authority for Christchurch
- The city of Christchurch, New Zealand
- Christchurch United, a former association football team from Christchurch, New Zealand
- Christchurch Central City, a suburb of Christchurch
- Christchurch City Shiners, rugby league club
- Christchurch (New Zealand electorate), known as "City of Christchurch" from 1860 to 1871

== See also ==
- Christchurch (disambiguation)
