= Christ Church College =

Christchurch College or Christ Church College may refer to:

- Christ Church, Oxford, a constituent college of the University of Oxford in England
- Canterbury Christ Church University, Anglican new university in Canterbury, Kent, England
- Christ Church College, Matale, a mixed government school located in Matale, Sri Lanka
- Christ Church College, Kanpur, an affiliate of Kanpur University in Uttar Pradesh, India

== See also ==
- Christ Church (disambiguation)
- Christ College (disambiguation)
- Christ's College (disambiguation)
