= Nathaniel Hitch =

British sculptor (1845–1938)

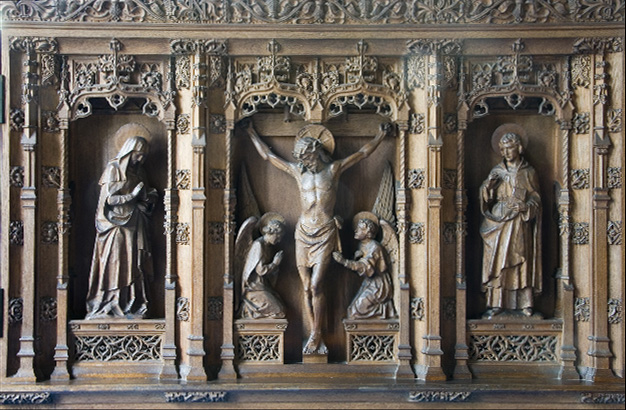
- Reredos in Gresford Church near Wrexham, by Nathaniel Hitch
- Born: 31 May 1845; Ware, Hertfordshire, England
- Died: 1938 (aged 92–93)
- Education: Borough Polytechnic
- Known for: Sculpture

Nathaniel Hitch (1845–1938) was a British sculptor. As a young man, he became an apprentice sculptor journeyman and after studying at the Borough Polytechnic and experience working alongside architectural sculptors, he developed a career carving altarpieces, church furniture and other decorative features for churches.

== Early years ==
Nathaniel Hitch was born in Ware, Hertfordshire in 1845, his father being George Hitch, a joiner, carpenter and builder by trade.

Showing an early talent for working with his hands, Hitch created a small model for the vestry of Ware Parish Church when he was 12 years age.

== Apprenticeship ==
In around 1860, Hitch was apprenticed to the architectural sculptors, Farmer and Brindley in London who worked in wood, stone and metal creating art metalwork and architectural furnishings. Until Hitch developed his own commissions it is difficult to speculate as to what he worked on, but the major commissions competed by his employers may provide some insight. Farmer and Brindley's clients at the time of Hitch's apprenticeship included Alfred Waterhouse and Sir Gilbert Scott and their projects included work on the Natural History Museum, Albert Memorial, and Westminster Cathedral. Hitch would have "carved out rough-hewn forms ready for the master carver to add the fine details and finishing touches to the sculpture."

To further his skills, Hitch attended Borough Polytechnic, now London South Bank University between 1894 and 1901, this arranged by Farmer and Brindley.

== Career ==
After Farmer and Brindley, Hitch was employed by the sculptor Thomas Nicholls, one of whose projects was work at Lord Bute's Cardiff Castle for the architect William Burges. Burges was responsible for considerable renovation to the castle, which included nine animal sculptures built into what was called the Animal Wall which was completed by Nicholls possibly with Hitch's assistance.

Hitch's career spanned the years 1871 to 1935 and although he considered himself primarily as an architectural sculptor, he was also a mason, sculptor, sculptor's modeller and church decorator. For most of his life he ran a small business in Battersea in Greater London, employing several highly skilled masons.

=== Associations with architects ===
Hitch worked with several architects who used him to carve altarpieces, church furniture and other decorative features on churches they were commissioned to design and during his career he worked with architects such as John Loughborough Pearson, who provided Hitch with most of his commissions. His association with Pearson spanned at least the period between 1880 and 1912. Hitch also worked with William Douglas Caröe, a student of Pearson, as well as H. Fuller Clark, T.H. Lyon, and Paul Waterhouse.

=== Churches and cathedrals ===
Working on cathedrals and churches was Hitch's speciality, some of which included:

- All Saints Church, Hove – an Anglican church in Brighton and Hove, England
- Beverley Minster – a large Church of England parish church in Beverley, England
- Bristol Cathedral (The Cathedral Church of the Holy and Undivided Trinity) – a Church of England cathedral in Bristol, England
- Calcutta Cathedral, India
- Canterbury Cathedral (Cathedral and Metropolitical Church of Christ at Canterbury) – a Church of England cathedral in Canterbury, England
- Lincoln Cathedral (The Cathedral Church of the Blessed Virgin Mary of Lincoln) – a Church of England cathedral in Lincoln, England
- Peterborough Cathedral (Cathedral Church of St Peter, St Paul and St Andrew) – a Church of England cathedral in Peterborough, England
- Sydney Cathedral – an Anglican cathedral in Sydney, Australia
- Truro Cathedral (The Cathedral of the Blessed Virgin Mary, Truro) – an Anglican cathedral in Truro, Cornwall, England
- Washington Cathedral – an Episcopal Church in Washington, D.C., United States
- Westminster Abbey (Collegiate Church of St Peter at Westminster) – a Royal Peculiar in the City of Westminster, England

=== Exhibition ===
He exhibited only once at the Royal Academy exhibition, showing a bust of F. Weekes Esquire there in 1884.

=== Contribution ===
The following quote was taken from the obituary for Hitch in "The Times":

Mr.Nathaniel Hitch, who died in London on Friday at the age of 92, was a notable craftsman and sculptor.

A native of Ware, in Hertfordshire, he came to London at the age of 14 and for over 70 years he worked continuously. He was responsible for the entire decorative sculpture in Truro Cathedral when it was built 50 years ago, the reredos and sculpture to the screen in Bristol Cathedral, the great reredos at All Saints’ Church, Hove, and the statues which complete Street’s screen in the Chapel of New College, Oxford. His later work included the recumbent statues of Bishop Satterlee and Bishop Harding, both in Washington Cathedral, U.S.A. and of Bishop Owen in St David’s Cathedral. Sydney Cathedral and Adelaide Cathedral both contain sculpture by him for their reredos as does also Calcutta Cathedral, and his work is to be seen in Canterbury, Lincoln and Peterborough Cathedrals, Beverley Minster and Westminster Hall.

== Personal life ==
Hitch was married and the father of at least nine children, among them Frederick Brook Hitch who worked with his father in his studio. Upon Nathaniel Hitch's death, Frederick focused his career on mainstream sculpture, rather than architectural work.

During his life, Hitch lived in the following places:

- 1871 – he was a boarder at a house on Doulting Street in Doulting, Somerset
- 1880 – at 21 Harleyford Road, Lambeth, London
- 1891 until 1926 – he had a studio at another address on Harleyford Road, Lambeth, London

Hitch died on 28 January 1938 at the age of 92.

== Gallery ==
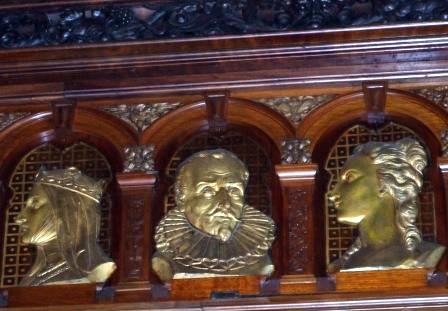
Carvings by Hitch of literary characters located in 2 Temple Place, Embankment, London

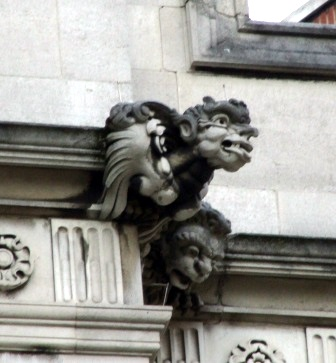
Exterior carvings by Hitch at 2 Temple Place, Embankment, London

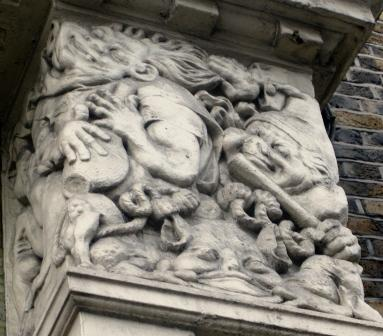
Nathaniel Hitch carving on the "Black Friar" Public House

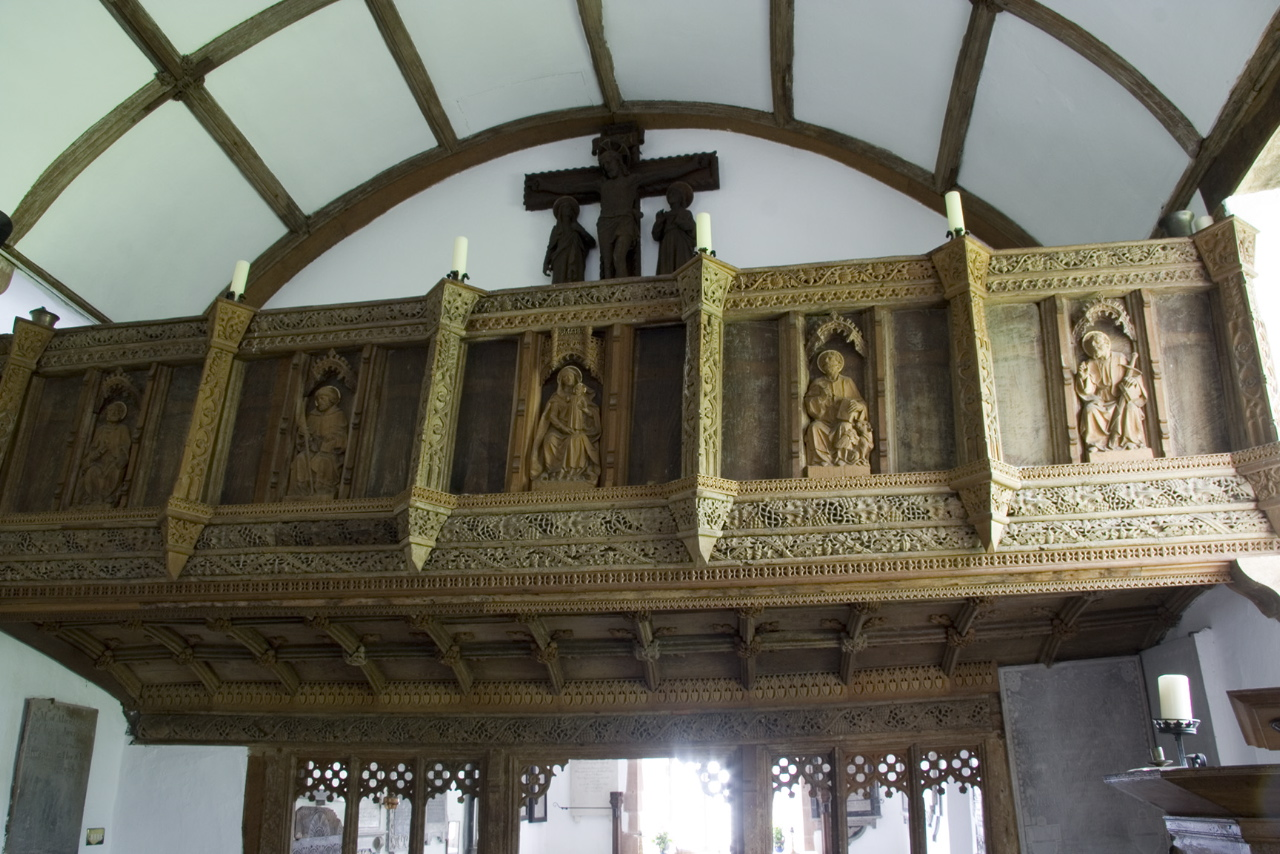
Work by Hitch in the Church of St Milburga, Llanfilo, Powys

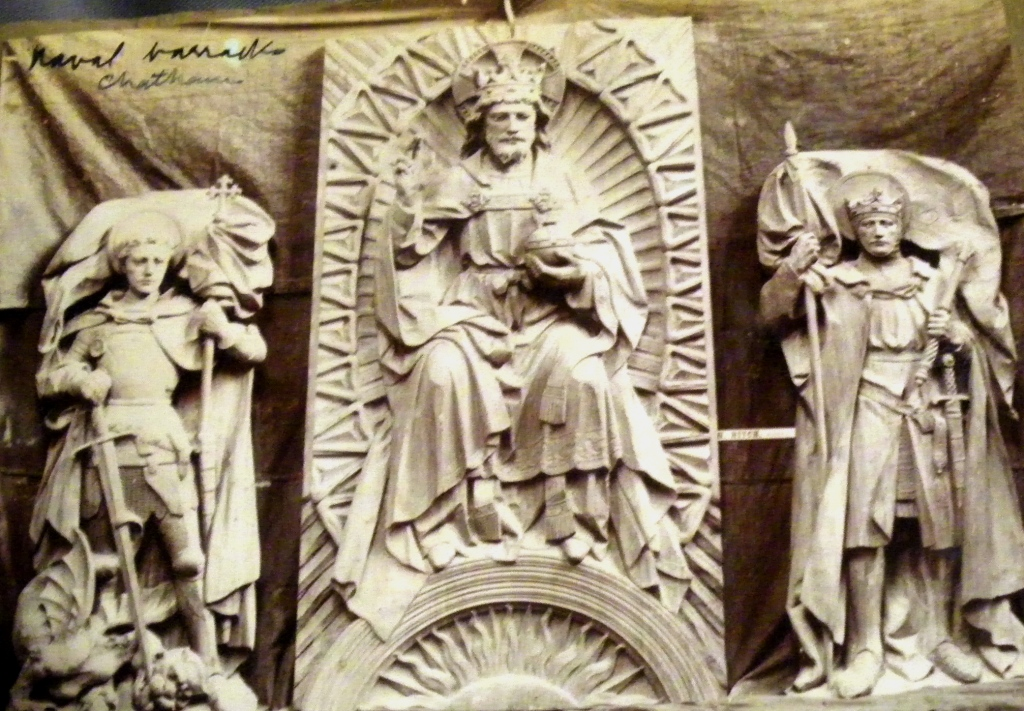
Reredos for the old Naval Barracks Chapel in Chatham

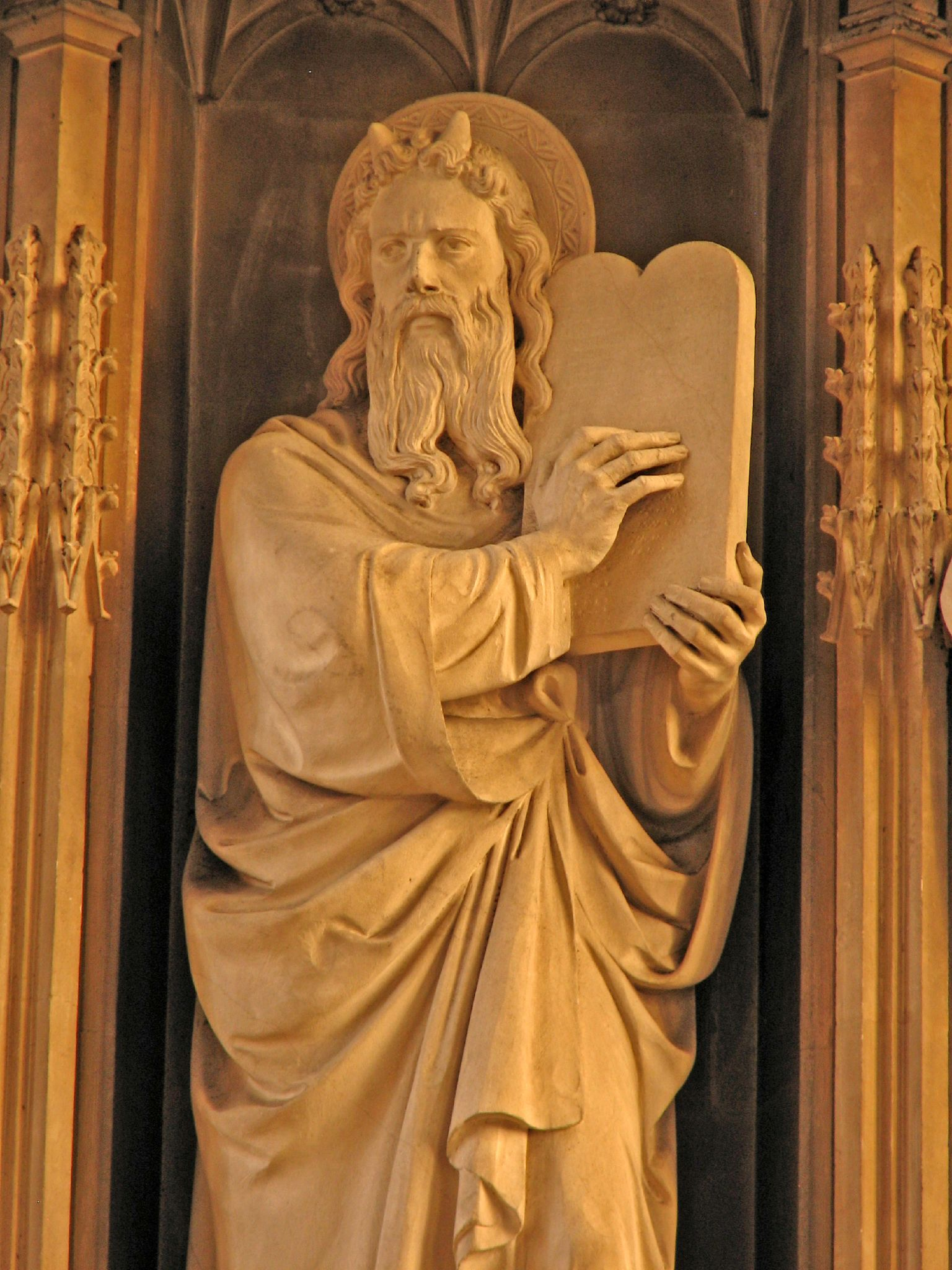
Statue of Moses - part of the reredos in New College Chapel, Oxford

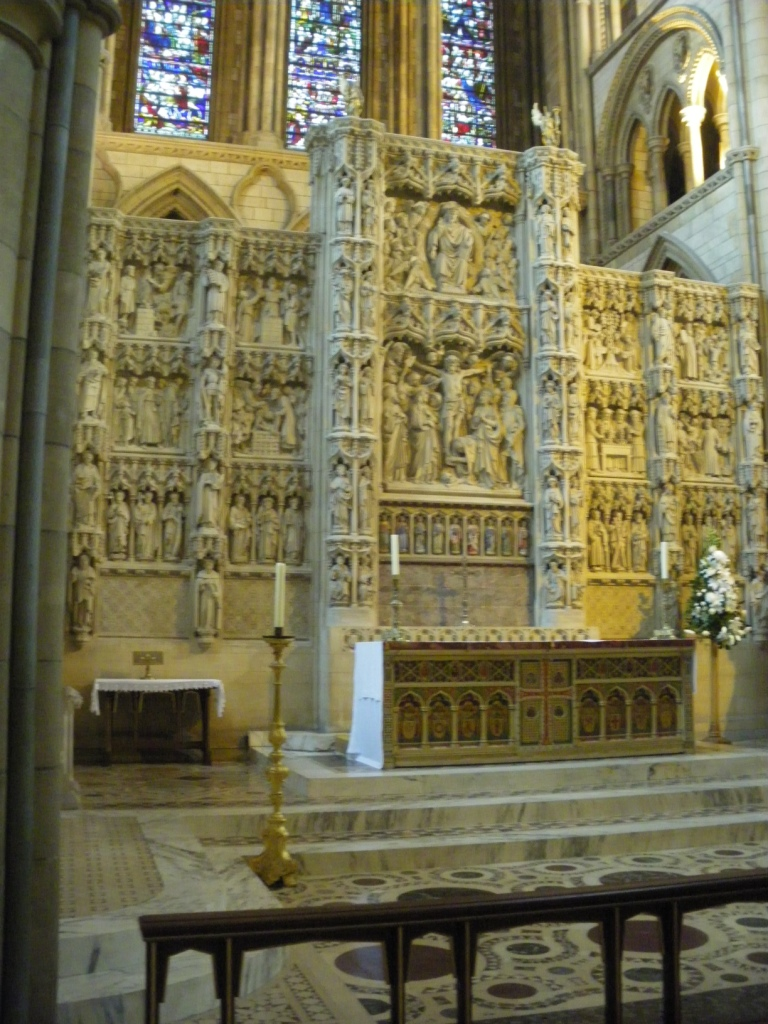
The reredos at Truro Cathedral

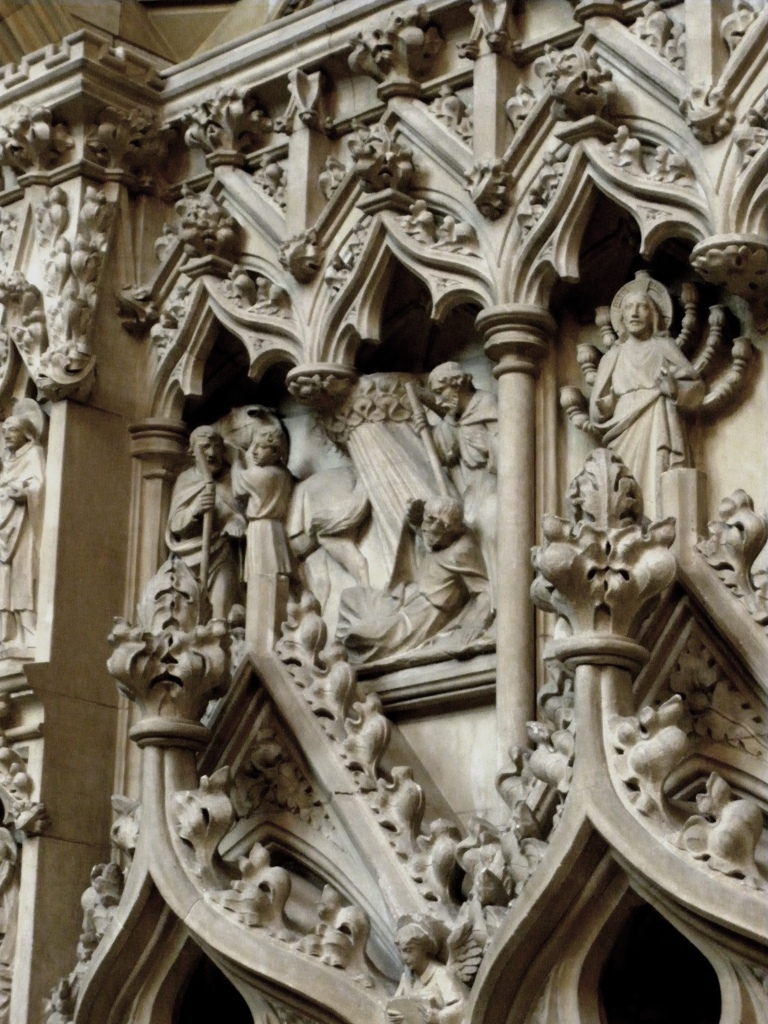
Part of Hitch's carving on the Truro Cathedral reredos

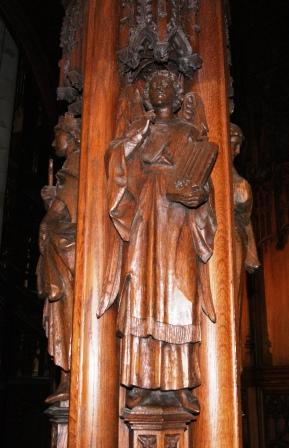
Beverley organ casing carving
