= Christuskirche =

Christuskirche (German for Christ Church) may refer to:

== Germany ==
- Christuskirche, Königsberg (now Kaliningrad, Russia), damaged in 1944/5 and demolished in 1960
- Ratshof Church or Christuskirche, in Königsberg
- Christuskirche, Mainz
- Christuskirche, Walsdorf, in Idstein, Hesse
- Christuskirche station, a Hamburg U-Bahn station in Eimsbüttel

== Other countries ==
- Christuskirche, Paris, France
- Christuskirche, Rome, Italy
- German Speaking Evangelical Congregation in Iran or Christuskirche Teheran

== See also ==
- Christ Church (disambiguation)
