= St Stephen's Presbyterian Church and Manse, Queanbeyan =

St Stephen's Presbyterian Church, Queanbeyan
- St Stephen's Presbyterian Church and Manse
- Queanbeyan Presbyterian Church
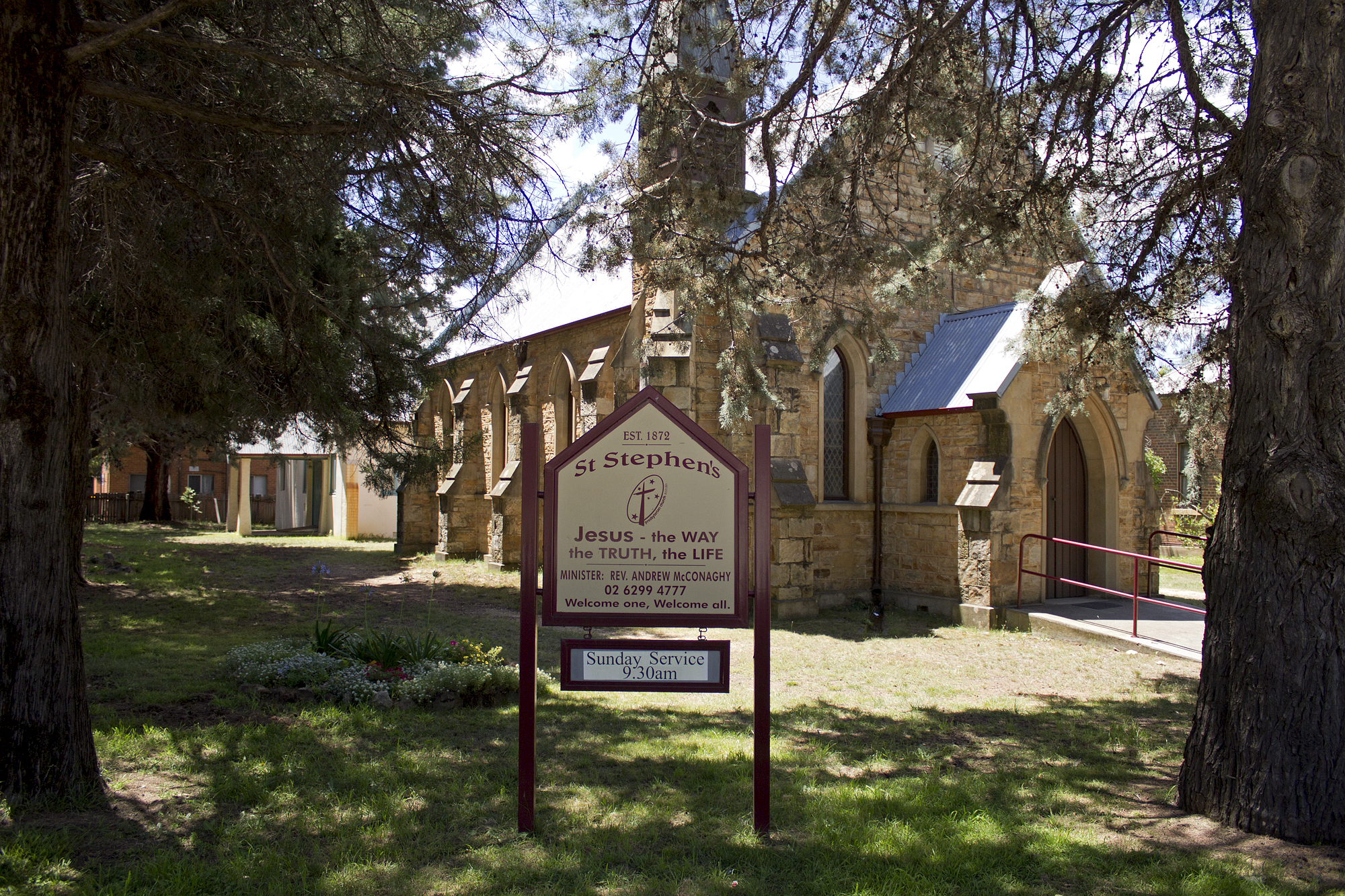
- St Stephen's Presbyterian Church, 2011
- St Stephen's Presbyterian Church, Queanbeyan
- 35°21′08″S 149°13′52″E
- Location: 2 Morisset Street, Queanbeyan, New South Wales
- Country: Australia
- Denomination: Presbyterian
- Website: queanbeyanpc.org

History
- Status: Parish church
- Founded: October 1871
- Founders: Dr Andrew Morton; Reverend William Mackenzie
- Dedication: Saint Stephen

Architecture
- Functional status: Active
- Architects: Alberto Dias Soares (church); James Barnet (manse)
- Architectural type: Victorian Gothic Revival, with some Early English features
- Years built: 1872–1883

Administration
- Division: New South Wales
- Parish: Queanbeyan

Clergy
- Pastor: Robert McMullan

New South Wales Heritage Register
- Official name: St Stephen's Presbyterian Church and Manse
- Type: State heritage (built)
- Designated: 24 May 2019
- Reference no.: 2018
- Type: Church
- Category: Religion
- Builders: Thomas Priest (stonemason); Thomas Jordan (carpenter); John Kealman (carpenter)

St Stephen's Presbyterian Church and Manse, also known as Queanbeyan Presbyterian Church, is a heritage-listed Presbyterian church and manse at 2 Morisset Street, Queanbeyan, New South Wales, Australia. It was designed by Alberto Dias Soares (church) and James Barnet (manse) and built from 1872 to 1883 by Thomas Priest (stonemason), Thomas Jordan (carpenter), John Kealman (carpenter). The property is owned by Presbyterian Church of NSW Property Trust. It was added to the New South Wales State Heritage Register on 24 May 2019.

== History ==
=== St Stephen's Presbyterian Church ===
The first Presbyterian services were held in the Queanbeyan district by a visiting minister in mid-1838, but it was to be many years before the town had its own resident minister. In the early 1850s, the Reverend William Ritchie, who resided in Yass rather that Queanbeyan, commenced services four times a year in the old Kent Hotel. It was during this ministry that the local Presbyterian community succeeded in 1852 in obtaining a grant of land at the corner of Morisset and Lowe Streets for a church, school and manse. The grant, which was apparently not formally gazetted until 13 December 1859, consisted of four contiguous allotments - Lots 1, 2, 3 and 20 - in Section 25, Town of Queanbeyan. Each of the allotments measured two roods in area. Lots 1 and 2 were intended for the church, Lot 3 for a school and Lot 20 fronting Lowe Street for the manse.

In December 1861, Dr Andrew Morton, a Queanbeyan medical practitioner, called the local Presbyterians to a meeting to initiate the building of a church in the town. A subscription list was opened and, by the end of May 1862, Morton had secured promises of A£400. But there the matter lapsed. The Presbyterian community was beset with troubles, partly caused by the Reverend John Lang, and was unable to find a minister to settle permanently in the town. It was only in March 1870 that the situation took on a rather more settled aspect when the Reverend William Mackenzie arrived in town virtually direct from Scotland. He would reinvigorate the church building project, as well as fostering the building of churches in Canberra and in Bungendore.

At a meeting following Mackenzie's formal induction to the Queanbeyan charge on 29 June 1870, his brother, the Reverend Simon Mackenzie of Goulburn, approached several prominent members of the local Presbyterian community for donations to build a church. He received promised of A£275, notably A£100 from Charles McKeahnie of "Booroomba" and A£50 from Dr Morton. It was estimated, however, that a sum of around A£750 would be needed for the construction and fitting out of the church. A Church Building Committee was formed with Morton as its chairman, but more than seven months on from Mackenzie's inauguration the committee had not raised sufficient funds to commence buildings.

Six months later, a fresh effort was made to get the project underway when a meeting of the Church Building Committee was called for 12 August 1871. The newspaper advertisement for the meeting specifically requested the attendance of collectors, adding hopefully that "in the interval they will exert themselves in gathering in all promised subscriptions". Evidently sufficient funds were collected for the committee soon afterwards engaged an architect to draw up plans and specifications for the building. The architect the committee chose for the task was the Reverend Alberto Dias Soares who was the local Church of England minister and Rector or Christ Church in Queanbeyan. Soares had actually offered his services as an architect gratis (for free).

=== Alberto Dias Soares ===
Born in London in 1830, Soares was the son of the Portuguese Consul and merchant, His Excellency Manoel Joachim Soares, and his English wife Camilla (née Lodington). He attended the Putney School for Civil Engineers in London in 1849–1850. Apart from an innate talent for drawing and art lessons in Porto in 1847, his training as an engineer appears to have been his only qualification for undertaking architectural work. In August 1852, he departed for Australia with visions of a career in engineering and of furthering a grand scheme that had been proposed for a colonial railway. Once in Australia, however, he found that no-one was interested in the scheme. His life took a wholly new direction in 1855 when he felt, and answered, a call to the ministry of the Anglican Church. Taking Deacon's orders in May 1856, he was appointed to his first incumbency, Queanbeyan, in April 1857 and was ordained a priest on 7 June.

On his arrival in Queanbeyan, Soares met with an urgent need for his expertise in engineering and design. The existing Christ Church had been built in 1844 and was quite an inadequate structure. Soares thereupon designed a new church in Romanesque style and had it erected in 1859–60. The church now forms part of the heritage-listed Christ Church Anglican Group in Queanbeyan. Church of England authorities swiftly awoke to Soares's value as an architect and, when the Anglican Diocese of Goulburn was formed in 1863, the foundation bishop appointed him Honorary Diocesan Architect. During what would become nearly thirty years practice as an architect, Soares would eventually design at least sixteen churches, as well as major extensions to St John the Baptist Church, Reid in the ACT. St Stephen's in Queanbeyan was the only Presbyterian church he designed; all the other churches were Church of England establishments.

Apart from his work as an architect for churches, Soares designed nine parsonages or rectories, three school buildings and two church halls. He undertook a small amount of private work as well, notably the Hibernia Lodge, a stately Gothic Revival residence erected in Queanbeyan in 1865 and now listed on the New South Wales State Heritage Register. His private work included some role, probably in an advisory and supervisory capacity, for extensions to Duntroon House in 1862 and 1876 and perhaps too for extensions to the stone Duntroon woolshed in the early 1860s. He may also have designed St Matthew's Rectory in Kiewa Street, Albury, in 1859 and the parsonage for St James' Church, Binda, in 1874 based on information from the NSW State Heritage Inventory. The architectural historian Morton Herman described Soares as "an amateur architect of no mean ability". The only comparable figure as a cleric architect in Australia is the Roman Catholic clergyman, Monsignor John Hawes (1876–1956) who practised in Western Australia in the period 1915–1939.

Although Soares designed buildings in such far-flung places as Balranald (St Barnabas' Church) and Wentworth (St John's Church and Parsonage), it is not surprising that more of his buildings were erected in Queanbeyan than in any other location. He was based in Queanbeyan for twenty years and, during that time, designed seven buildings in the town. Two of them, a set of conjoined cottages in Rutledge Street and the Protestant Church Hall in Crawford Street, have been demolished, in c. 1983 and 1994 respectively. Of the other five buildings, four are listed on the NSW State Heritage Register, three of them - Christ Church, the associated school extension (1864) and the Rectory (1875) - as part of the Christ Church Anglican Group. The other NSW State Heritage Register-listed structure is Hibernia Lodge. The remaining building is St Stephen's Church.

==== Design and construction of St Stephen's Church ====
Soares prepared plans and specifications for St Stephen's by October 1871. His design, which was for a fairly plain structure, was examined by the Church Building Committee on 20 October and it was probably at this time that its members requested a more ornamental appearance for the church. Soares obliged by adding buttresses to the design. These served no structural purpose and were purely for visual effect. They also added a sum of A£100 to the cost of the building, a cost that was covered by contributions of A£25 each from Dr Morton, Charles McKeahnie, Kenneth Cameron and Robert McKellar.

As construction was about to commence, the church in its final design was described as "a neat gothic structure with a bell tower surmounted by a lofty spire. The walls are to be of rubble masonry in courses with axed quoins, the arches copings, etc., to be finished with Portland cement".

In February 1872 the Reverend Mackenzie called for tenders to undertake the necessary works. As no suitable tenders were received, a further call for tenders was issued in the latter half of March. This yielded a positive result the following month when the committee accepted tenders from Thomas Priest for the masonry and Thomas Jordon for the carpentry and joinery.

The other contractors to work on St Stephen's were John Evetts (or Evitts) for the plastering, Augustus Ferdinand Helmund for the painting and, notably, John Kealman for carpentry and joinery. They were all local tradesmen. Kealman was a builder in his own right who would go on to establish a large brickmaking enterprise in Queanbeyan, as well as building the neighbouring St Stephen's Manse in 1883. His contract at Stephen's was to fabricate the window frames, interior fittings like the pews, and the picket fence and gates that enclosed the church. He also designed and built the pulpit free of charge for the congregation.

At a ceremony on 16 May 1872, Charles McKeahnie's wife Elizabeth laid the foundation stone of the church. Work on the building then proceeded very slowly. The main reason for this was that the Building Committee had neglected to bind the contractors to any schedule. Eventually, still in an unfinished state, the church was opened and the first service conducted in it on 8 March 1874. At this time, all of the church's window openings were covered with calico because the manufacturer had not yet supplied the stained glass windows. As well, a temporary fence of rough palings surrounded the church grounds because Kealman had been unable to obtain sufficient seasoned timber to complete the picket fence and gates. For the same reason, he had not been able to finish the pews, the church having to borrow seating from the Court House and the Methodist Church for the opening ceremony.

One highly satisfactory aspect of the opening was that the church had cleared all costs of construction and fitting out. The fees for the contractors on the building, the quarryman and the foundry, as well as sundry expenses, had amounted to A£583. It is unclear whether this amount included the additional 100 pounds for the decorative buttresses, but this cost had of course been met by four of the better-heeled members of the congregation.

The new church was Victorian Gothic Revival in style, with some Early English features. With space to comfortably accommodate 150 worshippers, it consisted of a four-bay nave, a porch on its east-facing front and a vestry or session room on its western end. The body of the church contained ten lancet windows, while the porch had two such windows of smaller dimensions and the vestry one. Behind the pulpit in the western end of the church was a large quatrefoil window. The label moulds over the windows featured bosses with foliage motifs and those over the doors had bosses composed of the heads of Grecian figures. The frames of all the windows and doors were of oak. The building had a shingle roof and a barrel ceiling lined with varnished tongue-and-groove pine boards. Thomas Priest's masonry work on the church was described as "superior to anything of the class in the district" at the time.

Rising from the southwestern corner of the building was a low bell-tower surmounted by a spire sheathed in zinc. This was evidently not the lofty tower that was originally envisaged for the church. John Gale, the Honorary Secretary of the Church Building Committee, described the tower at the time of the church's opening as having a "paltry appearance". A Mr Holdsworth of Sydney donated a bell for the bell-tower, but this was quickly found to be inadequate. Two women members of the congregation then purchased a "much larger and finer toned" bell and donated it anonymously to the church; it was installed on 25 April 1874. At the same time, Kealman was at work erecting the picket fence around the building.

St Stephen's has remained substantially intact since it was built, though some improvements and other changes have been made both to its interior and exterior. The church was provided with a reed organ in 1885, but this was replaced with a better one in 1904 and then with a more elaborate and expensive Estey organ in August 1913. The Estey, which features philharmonic reeds and sixteen stops, is still in working order in the church. A significant addition was made to the fabric of the church after a storm destroyed the circular quatrefoil window in its western end in January 1896. A replacement circular window of stained glass was unveiled by Amy Steel, the wife of the minister, on 31 May 1896, the window depicting the burning bush accompanied by the Latin inscription "nec tamen consumebatur" ('and yet it was not being consumed'). It was made of 394 separate pieces of glass, each piece having to be handled six times during the manufacturing process.

On 14 March 1897, less than a year after she unveiled the new window, Amy Steel died at the early age of 40. She was later commemorated by two memorials erected in the church. On 29 November 1910, at the time of the 50-year anniversary of the establishment of a Presbyterian charge in Queanbeyan, the congregation donated to the church in her honour a stained glass window bearing a Greek cross, Anchor Cross and "IHS", and the phrase from Revelations 2:10 "Be thou faithful unto death and I will give thee a crown of life". It was unveiled by Amy's daughter Ruby, who was the wife of the incumbent minister, the Reverend E. Sydney Henderson. At the same time, the family donated to Amy's memory a memorial tablet that was erected over the pulpit.

The 1910 jubilee ceremony was also the occasion on which Charles Henry McKeahnie presented to the church a baptismal font of prized Oamaru limestone from New Zealand. The font was in memory both of his parents, Charles and Elizabeth, who had been the church's leading benefactors, and of his two daughters, Jane and Sarah.

Another commemorative plaque was unveiled in the church on 12 September 1915, this one a memorial to 31 deceased pioneers of the church community. Paid for by their descendants, it featured the names of the pioneers inscribed on a sculptured tablet of Carrara marble mounted on a slab of polished black marble from Belgium. It was fixed to the wall at the western end of the nave behind the pulpit. In all, the monument weighed over 136 kilograms (3 short cwt).

The onset of WWI prompted the placement of two further memorials in the church. On 13 August 1916, at the time of the second anniversary of the outbreak of the war, an "Honor Board" was erected in the church which carried the names of the men of the Queanbeyan-Canberra parish who had enlisted for service to that point. The board, of polished maple surmounted by a Gothic pediment, was donated by the families of the enlistees. A second honour board of Borneo cedar was unveiled in the church by Mrs John McInnes in October 1919.

During the war years, too, the church organist, Miss Violet Knox, donated a hymn board to the church. The board was unusual in that its face carried the badge of the Presbyterian Church with "uniquely in the centre of it [was] inscribed the Hebrew characters of the Divine Name". By this time, a gas supply had also been laid on to the church. In March 1930, Archibald McKeahnie, the eldest son of Charles, died leaving a gift of A£50 to the church to be used as it saw fit. The money was used in 1936 to purchase five special chairs and a remodelled communion table.

A major change to the church grounds occurred in 1924 when St Stephen's Hall was erected on the same allotment as the church and immediately to its rear. The hall was designed by a Church Elder, J. D. McConnell, and built by voluntary labour. Officially opened on 7 October 1924, the building was a larger and sturdier structure than initially envisaged. McConnell took care, as well, to harmonise its design with that of the church. The building's roof matched the steeply pitched roof of the church and it featured buttresses which, like those of the church, were purely ornamental. The principal purpose of the hall was as a venue for Sunday School, with attendances increasing markedly after the hall was opened. It was also available for hire and was used, for example, by the Salvation Army. The funds earned from rental helped to pay for the building, but most of the building costs were met by the sale of the vacant Lot 20 Section 25 fronting Lowe Street which had originally been intended as the site for the manse. Sometime after 1974, additions were made to the northwestern side and rear (northeastern side) of the building.

A significant change to the church itself occurred in 1956 when the spire crowning the bell tower was blown down. George McInnes, a member of the congregation, provided funds for a new spire and it was erected by two other members of the congregation, C. Frommel and R. Hall. At some unknown time, the church was also re-roofed with CGI sheeting, either replacing or covering the original shingles.

On 9 February 1963, Reg Fallick, a senior partner in the Queanbeyan Age and a lifelong member of the St Stephen's congregation, laid the foundation stone of a new hall to be erected on Lot 3 Section 25, on the opposite side of the manse to the church. Fallick donated A£4,000 to the building project. The hall was officially opened on 31 August 1963, and, at the same time, a new brick fence was built across the Morisset Street frontage of the whole church property. This replaced a picket fence erected in 1907 which itself had replaced Kealman's original picket fence. An iron fence which had also been built in 1907 remained along the Lowe Street frontage until a picket fence was erected after 1974. Reg Fallick died the year after the new hall was built and it was thereafter named "Fallick Hall" in his honour. The hall was rented out for a pre-school and other community purposes.

Inside the church, Kealman's pulpit was moved from its original central position to the southwestern side in 1964. This was to permit easier access to the vestry, especially for wedding parties. At the same time, the side rail and bible rest were lowered, and the width reduced by 0.76 metres (2 ft 6 in). At an unknown recent date, a sloping concrete ramp with tubular iron side rails was added to the front of the church leading to the front door.

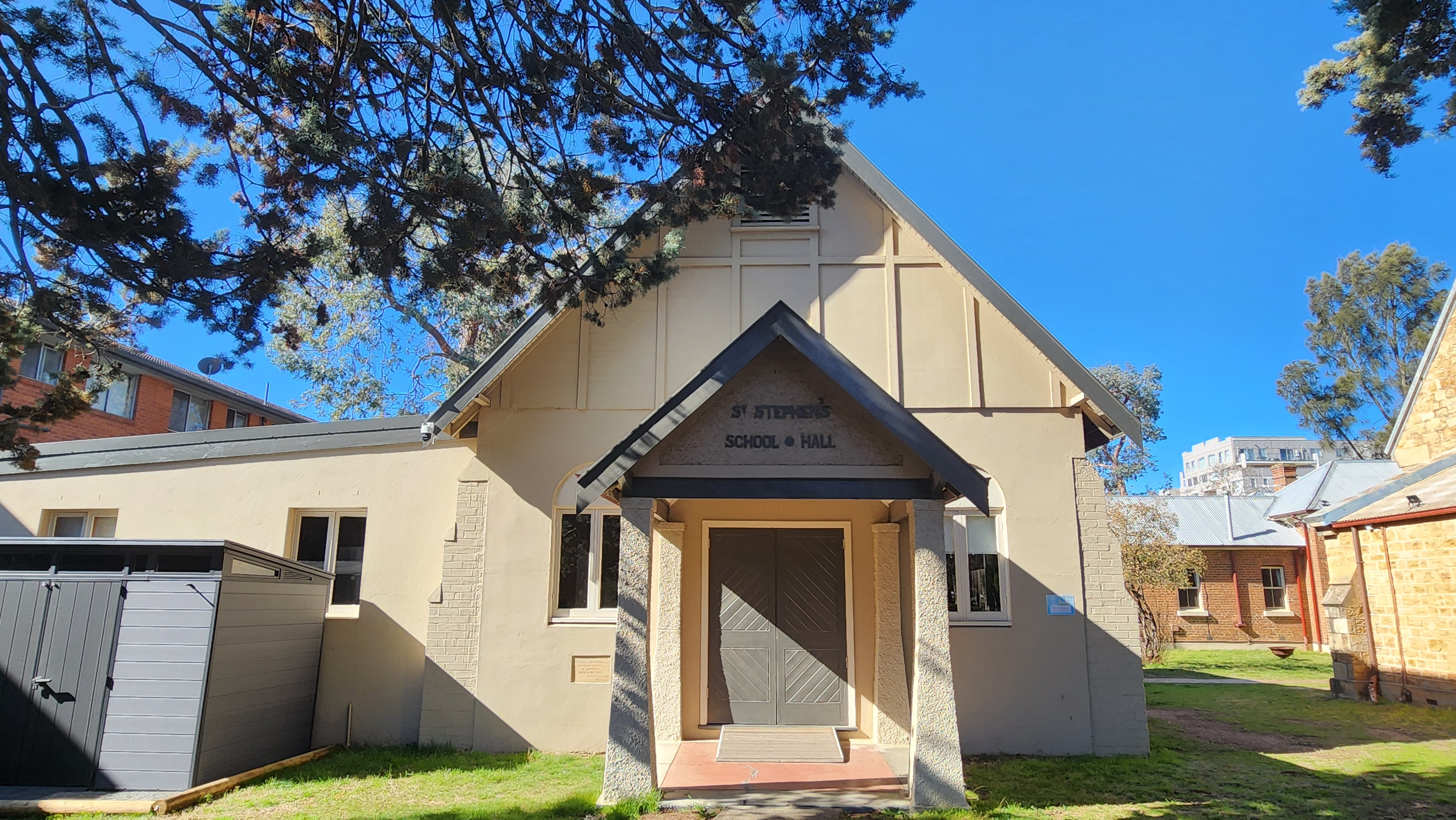
St Stephen's School Hall

=== St Stephen's Manse ===
The manse is one of a very few private or non-government buildings that Barnet designed during his long career in NSW. Before he entered government service, he was the architect for a couple of houses in Phillip Street, Sydney, some shops in Sussex Street and the Chalmers Presbyterian Church in Chalmers Street, Surry Hills. Of these, only the church now survives. Known today as the Welsh Presbyterian Church, it and St Stephen's Manse are the only remaining examples of Barnet's work as an architect of private buildings.

Barnet designed the manse free of charge for the Reverend Robert Alexander Streel, MA, his wife Amy and their family in 1881. Amy Steel was Barnet's eldest daughter. When the Reverend Steel was appointed to Queanbeyan in May 1881, there was no manse in the whole charge nor even any other suitable premises in the town for him and his family to occupy. They were forced to put up in Bungendore until a manse was provided for them in Queanbeyan. For this purpose, the church formed a Manse Building Committee soon after Steel's appointment.

Barnet produced plans and specifications for the manse by September 1881. It comprised a six-room brick cottage on a stone foundation, with an attached kitchen and 'Servant's Room'. No early start was made on construction, however, because the Building Committee was unable to raise sufficient funds. Probably in a bid to cut the costs of construction, the committee approved some unspecified modifications to the plans. In the end, it was to be more than twelve months before the committee members felt that they had just enough money in hand to call for tenders. Inevitably, of those contractors who submitted tenders, the committee chose the cheapest.

It was not a wise option. Within three months, it became clear that the successful tenderer, a builder from Woodhouselee near Goulburn, was unable to fulfil the contract. In fact, he had not even made a start. At this impasse, the committee turned to a trusted local contractor, John Kealman. Although his final price of A£650 was well above the A£509 quoted by the failed Woodhouselee tenderer, Kealman and his work were well known to church members. Not only was he a member of the church's congregation, but in the 1870s he had carried out the carpentry for St Stephen's and had even designed, built and donated the pulpit to the church.

Kealman was well credentialled and equipped to perform the work. After working as a carpenter on George Campbell's Duntroon property in the 1860s, he had learned how to make good quality bricks and moved into the building trade as a contractor in his own right. In 1875, he built the original St John's Presbyterian Church in Bungendore and, in 1876–78, rebuilt the spire of St John's Church in Canberra. A string of government contracts soon followed. He constructed additions to the Queanbeyan Court House and Gaol in 1877 and 1878 respectively, and erected the Bungendore Public School in 1879, the Queanbeyan Post Office in 1879–80, the Gundaroo Court House in 1882-83 and the Sutton Public School in 1882–83.

To enhance his business and the quality of his work, Kealman had established an imported brickmaking machine on the Garryowen Estate in Queanbeyan in 1879. This enterprise, the first of its kind in southern NSW, produced 4,000 high-quality bricks per day. Kealman would have used these bricks in the construction of the manse.

It was distinctly in Kealman's favour, too - and a reassurance to the Manse Building Committee - that Barnet was familiar with and approved of his work. During a visit to Queanbeyan in October 1881, Barnet had carried out a careful inspection of the construction of further additions to the Court House, for which Kealman was the contractor. On completing the inspection, Barnet expressed complete satisfaction with the standard of workmanship. Indeed, Barnet probably had previous acquaintance with Kealman's work. Kealman had erected the Queanbeyan Police Barracks or Police Sergeant's Residence, now the Queanbeyan Historical Museum, in 1875-76 and the town's Post Office in 1879–80, both of which Barnet may have designed or at least would have been closely associated with.

Kealman signed the contract to build the manse in January 1883 after "certain deviations from the plans" had been agreed upon. It is likely that the purpose of these "deviations" was to lower costs. One such deviation may have comprised the laying of Kealman's bricks in colonial bond on the less visible western side and rear of the building, in contrast to the use of English bond on the front and eastern sides. This strategy would have reduced the number of bricks and hence the cost of the construction.

The work of construction commenced in February 1883 and proceeded rapidly. The foundation stone of the building was laid at a ceremony on 22 March 1883, and, in May, work had advanced to the point where Kealman was able to roof in both the main building and the kitchen attachment. But a shortage of funds threatened the completion of work. At the end of June, the Building Committee remained 200 pounds shy of the figure required. Steel, thereupon, decided to launch an appeal for funds from the wider Presbyterian community. Through weekly advertisement in The Presbyterian and Australian Witness, he entreated Presbyterians in Sydney and other parts of the colony to make gifts of work or money so that a fund-raising "Sale of Work" could be held in late September. The appeal was evidently successful. The manse was completed in November, enabling Steel and his family to take up residence from their temporary refuge in Bungendore.

A photograph dating from c. 1886 shows the manse just a few years after its completion. Apart from the white picket fence which had been replaced by a brick fence, the front aspect of the building is unchanged. The roofline, chimneys, bay window, verandah, unrendered brickwork, awning over the windows on the eastern side and even the bargeboards remain today exactly as they were when the manse was erected. The interior of the building also remains largely intact. It retains original fireplaces, architraves, some pressed metal ceilings, and mantelpieces donated by Hudson Brothers Timber Merchants of Sydney in 1883.

While the original roof has been replaced by a new CGI roof, the principal change to the manse has been the building of an extension onto the eastern side of the structure at its rear. Now largely hidden by shrubs, the extension was built to match the original brickwork and window details. It may have been erected in the late 1880s or early 1890s, perhaps by Kealman, to accommodate the Steels' growing family. They eventually had seven children.

Although as a private dwelling the manse is a departure from government buildings that Barnet designed, in some degree it resembles some of the smaller official structure that either he personally or the Colonial Architect's Office designed in the "house style" he had established. These structures included police barracks and quarters for staff of lighthouses. Nevertheless, where these buildings embody the sober and solemn quality that Barnet intended for official structures, the manse exhibits a rather more homely, genial and welcoming character while still retaining an air of dignity and respectability. This Barnet achieved without resorting to the use of Picturesque and other new-fangled architectural ornamentation to which, by temperament and professional inclination, he was in any case vehemently opposed.

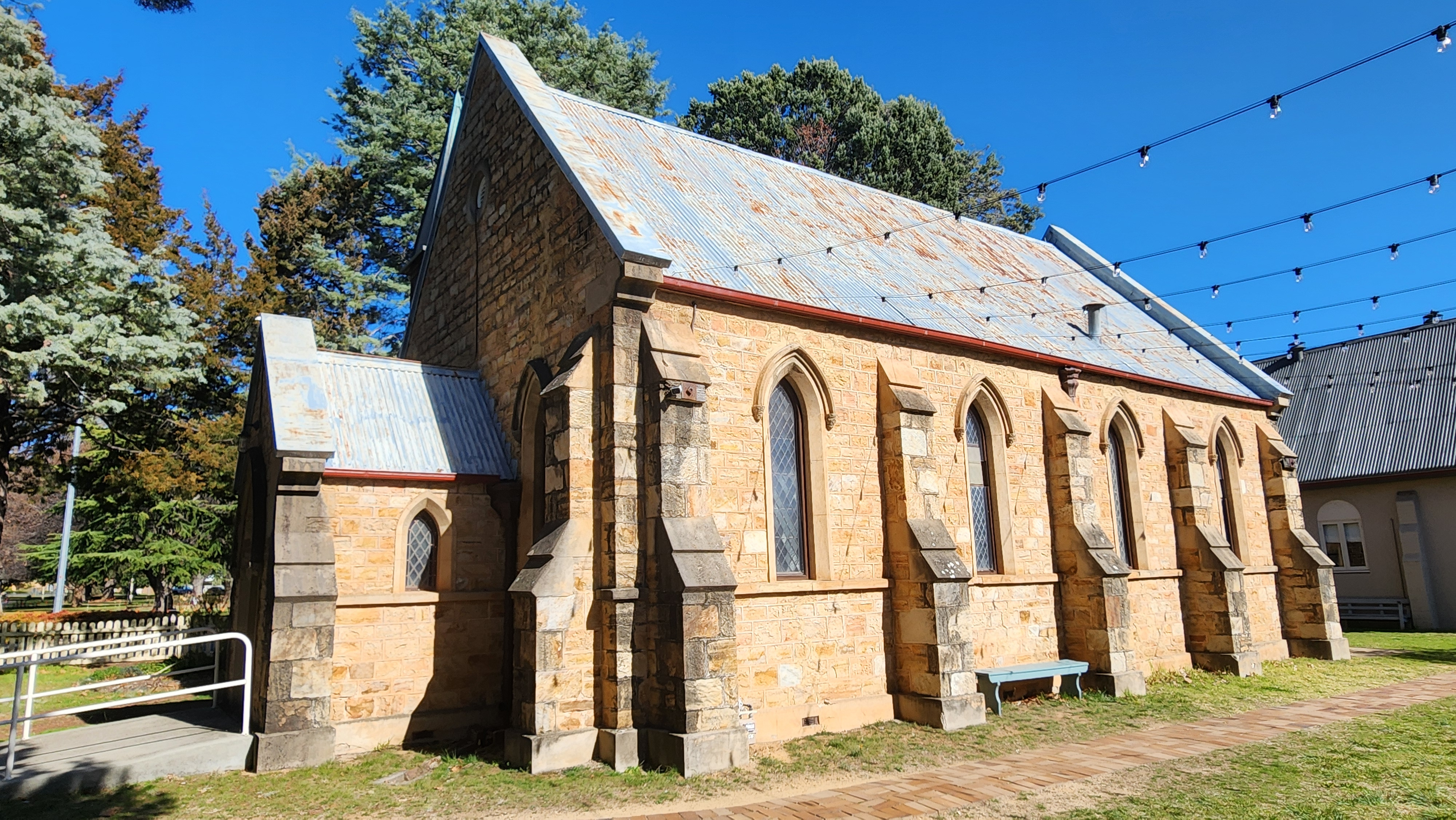
Right side view

== Description ==
=== St Stephen's Church ===
A small rural Gothic Revival church with some English features. Built of stone with a steeply pitched corrugated iron roof (originally shingles). The exterior walls have buttresses which serve no structural function but were built as an ornamental feature. Rising from the southwestern corner of the building is a low bell tower. It is surmounted by a spire that was constructed in 1956 after the original one was blown down and destroyed in high winds.

The church is a rectangular building orientated southeast–northwest. It has a four-bay nave, a porch on its front end, and a vestry or session room at its rear. There are ten lancet windows in the body of the church with two smaller examples in the porch and one in the vestry. The window and door frames are of oak. The window label moulds feature bosses with foliage motifs and the door label moulds feature bosses that are composed of the heads of Grecian figures. Behind the pulpit in the northern end of the nave is a large circular quatrefoil window that was installed in 1896. The nave has a barrel ceiling lined with varnished tongue-and-groove pine boards.

=== Manse ===
A single-storey brick cottage with attached kitchen and servant's room. It has a hipped and gabled roof sheathed in corrugated iron, which is not the original covering. There are two multi-corbel chimneys, decorative barge boards and a finial, and a front verandah with a skillion roof supported by slender timber columns with decorative timber brackets. The front of the cottage features a large rectangular bay window. The cottage brick work is laid in Colonial bond on the less visible western side and rear of the building. On the front and eastern side the bricks are laid in English bond. The interior retains original details, such as fireplaces, architraves, some pressed metal ceilings and mantel pieces. However, the fireplaces have been boarded up to prevent drafts in the recent past.

=== Condition ===
As at 13 April 2023, the church is in excellent condition. With an upgrade to the electrics in 2020 the church has updated lighting and a projection system. However, it does require some maintenance works to its structural walls to stop water penetration though the stonework.

The manse is in good condition and is currently occupied by the current Minister. It has recently undergone maintenance works funded by Queanbeyan-Palerang Regional Council to restore its exterior. This included restoration work on its bay window.

=== Modifications and dates ===
The Manse was extended on its rear side in the late 1880s to early 1890s in a sympathetic manner. A further extension was undertaken on its northern side potentially in the 1990s.

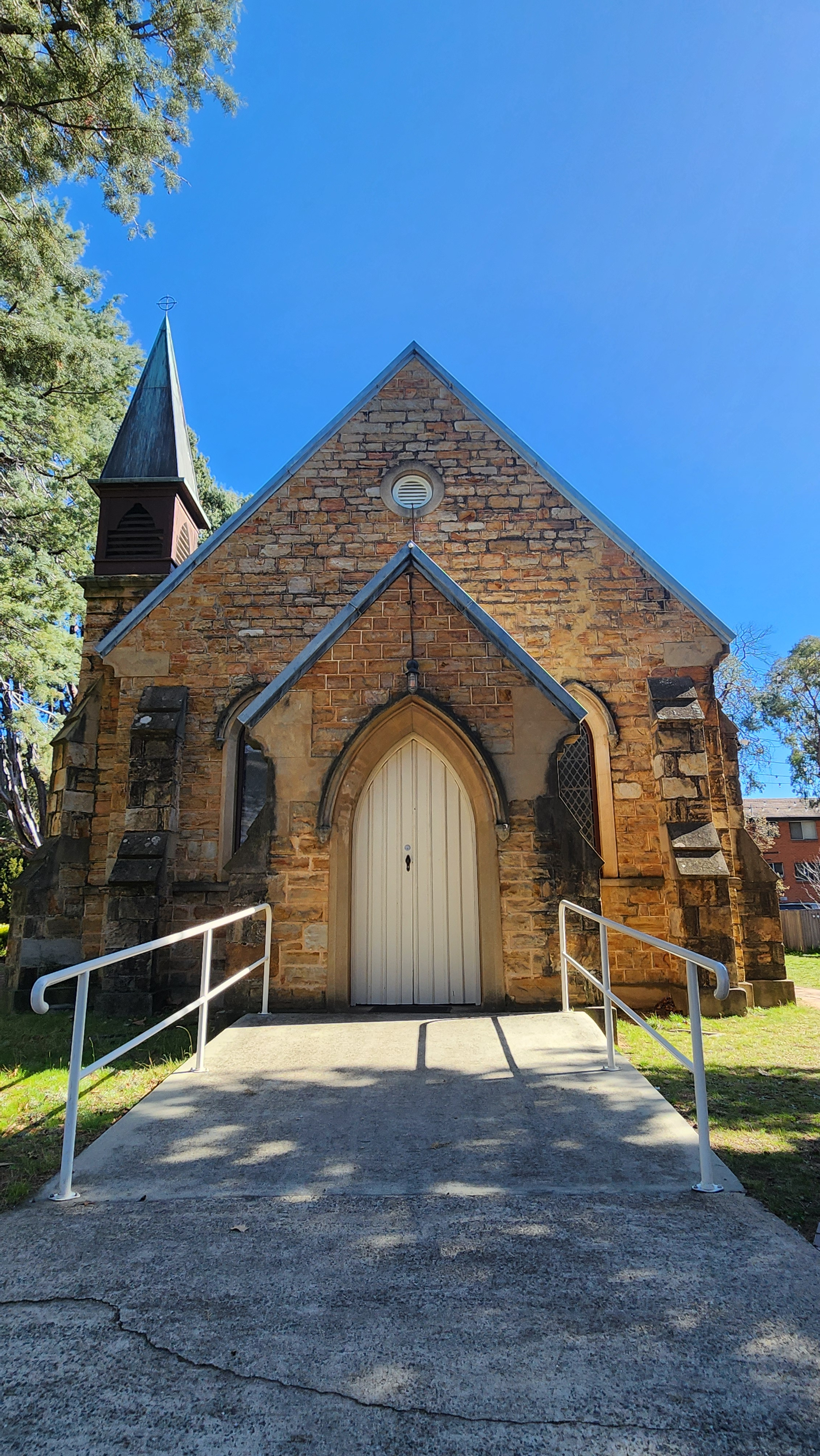
Entrance to church

== Heritage listing ==
As at 2 August 2017, St Stephen's Presbyterian Church and Manse are of state significance as a small, intact and harmonious ecclesiastical precinct.

The small rural gothic revival church is of state significance for its historic, associative, aesthetic, rarity, and representative values. It is the only non-Anglican church designed by Reverend Alberto Dias Soares, Honorary Diocesan Architect of the Anglican Diocese of Goulburn between 1863 and 1888. He is one of only two cleric-architects known to have practiced in Australia and the only one to have worked in NSW. During his career Soares designed 31 known buildings across southern NSW, mainly churches and parsonages, and today 26 are extant. He is responsible for populating much of southern NSW with aesthetical pleasing and ecclesiastical appropriate architecture for the Anglican Church throughout the second half of the nineteenth century. This church is also noteworthy as an attractive, well-designed and constructed example of the kind of modest Presbyterian churches built in country areas of NSW during this period.

The Manse is of state significance for its associative, aesthetic, rarity, and representative values. It is the only extant private domestic building of the three designed by James Barnet, NSW Colonial Architect (1865-1890), during his long architectural career. Barnet designed the manse for his eldest daughter Amy Steel and her family. Amy's husband Robert Steel was minister at St Stephen's for almost seventeen years between 1881 and 1897. This building displays a different side of Barnet's architectural character in comparison to his vast portfolio of government work. While resembling the smaller official structures he designed it has a more homely and welcoming character that retains an air of dignity and respectability appropriate for a Presbyterian minister. Overall, this Manse displays two often overlooked parts of Barnet's character: his strong family devotion and religious conviction.

St Stephen's Presbyterian Church and Manse was listed on the New South Wales State Heritage Register on 24 May 2019 having satisfied the following criteria.

The place is important in demonstrating the course, or pattern, of cultural or natural history in New South Wales.

St Stephen's Presbyterian Church is of state historic significance as it was designed by the only cleric-architect known to have practiced in NSW, Reverend Alberto Dias Soares, Honorary Diocesan Architect of the Anglican Diocese of Goulburn between 1863 and 1888. There has only been one other cleric-architect who worked in Australia, Monsignor John Hawes, who lived and worked in Western Australia.

The place has a strong or special association with a person, or group of persons, of importance of cultural or natural history of New South Wales's history.

St Stephen's Presbyterian Church is of state significance for its strong association with the cleric-architect Reverend Alberto Dias Soares (1830–1909). He is the only cleric-architect to have operated in NSW and during his architectural career between roughly 1859 and 1877 he designed and built 31 buildings, mostly churches and parsonages. These were mostly in the Diocese of Goulburn, for which he was Honorary Diocesan Architect between 1863 and 1888. However, at this time this diocese spread across southern NSW all the way to Wentworth. Among these items this church is special, as it was the only non-Anglican ecclesiastical structure he designed. Despite this being an act of kindness on his behalf, he earned the censure of his superiors for assisting the Anglican church's rivals.

St Stephen's Presbyterian Manse is of state significance for its strong association with James Barnet (1827–1904), NSW Colonial Architect between 1865 and 1890. During his long career he designed and built a large range of government buildings. However, outside of this office he is known to have designed only three private domestic buildings of which this manse is the only extant example. Barnett designed the building for his eldest daughter Amy Steel (1857-1897) and her family. Her husband, Reverend Robert Alexander Steel (1854–1916), was the minister of St Stephen's between 1881 and 1897.

The place is important in demonstrating aesthetic characteristics and/or a high degree of creative or technical achievement in New South Wales.

St Stephen's Presbyterian Church is of state aesthetic significance as it exhibits some noteworthy aesthetic characteristics of the gothic revival style in small rural churches. Specifically, the quality masonry work, lancet windows, label moulds adorned with bosses over the windows and doors, and circular stained-glass window. An unusual creative innovation in the design and construction of the church is the clever use of diagonal buttresses to support the corner belfry.

St Stephen's Presbyterian Manse is of state aesthetic significance as it displays aesthetic characteristics of a high order for a domestic structure that is of relatively modest scale. The unaltered characteristics since construction include the hipped and gabled roof, multi-corbel chimneys, decorative barge boards, finial, bay window and skillion-roofed front verandah supported by timber posts with ornate timber brackets. These various elements combine in a harmonious and well-proportioned whole.

The place possesses uncommon, rare or endangered aspects of the cultural or natural history of New South Wales.

St Stephen's Presbyterian Church is rare in a state context as the only non-Anglican church designed by the cleric-architect, Reverend Alberto Dias Soares, Honorary Diocesan Architect of the Anglican Diocese of Goulburn between 1863 and 1888.

St Stephen's Presbyterian Manse is rare in a state context as the only extant private domestic building of the three designed by James Barnett, NSW Colonial Architect (1864-1890), throughout his long architectural career.

The place is important in demonstrating the principal characteristics of a class of cultural or natural places/environments in New South Wales.

St Stephen's Presbyterian Church is of state representative significance as a fine intact example of the kind of modest Presbyterian churches built in country areas of NSW in the nineteenth century. It reflects the fashionable gothic revival design of these churches, as well as solid, high standard of construction in stone.

St Stephen's Presbyterian Manse has state representative significance as a fine and intact example of a nineteenth century clergyman's residence considering it was designed by such a distinguished architect. Furthermore, it is representative of Barnet's work in the private domain, displaying his abilities is a sphere outside the government structures he usually designed.

== See also ==
- Australian non-residential architectural styles
- List of Presbyterian and Reformed denominations in Australia
