= Christ Church Burial Ground (Quincy, Massachusetts) =

Historic cemetery in Massachusetts, United States

- U.S. National Register of Historic Places
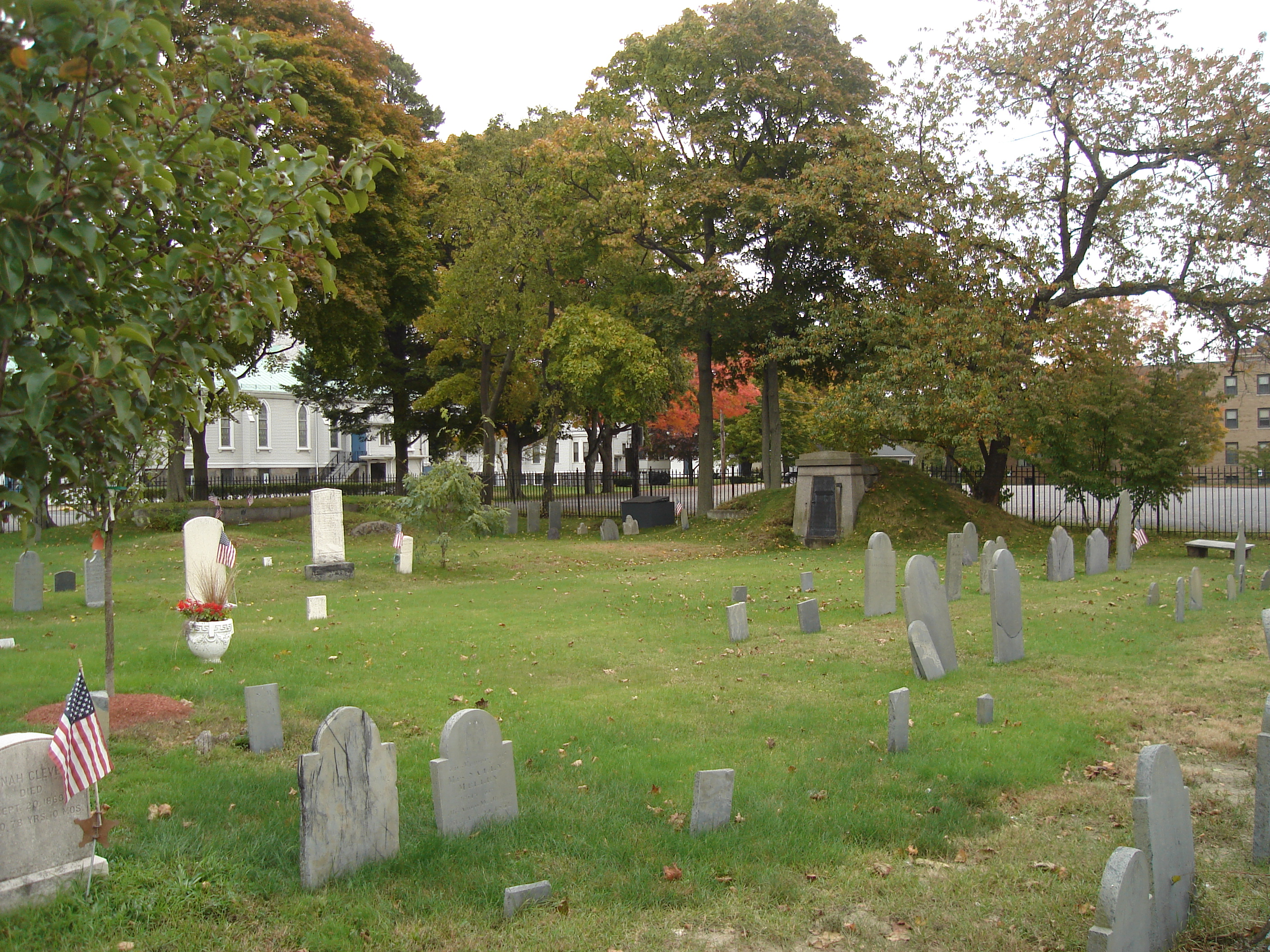

- Location within Massachusetts Location within the United States
- Location: 54–60 School St., Quincy, Massachusetts
- Coordinates: 42°14′39″N 71°0′9″W
- Built: 1737
- MPS: Quincy MRA
- NRHP reference No.: 89001372
- Added to NRHP: September 20, 1989

The Christ Church Burial Ground is a historic cemetery at 54–60 School Street in Quincy, Massachusetts. It is the cemetery of the Anglican Christ Church congregation, the second to be established in colonial Massachusetts. It is the site of the congregation's first church building, completed 1727, of which only a foundation element survives. The site's oldest grave marker is dated 1737; there may be older, unmarked graves. There are about 75 marked graves.

The cemetery was listed on the National Register of Historic Places in 1989.

== See also ==
- National Register of Historic Places listings in Quincy, Massachusetts
