= Christ Church (Guilford, Vermont) =

Historic church in Vermont, United States

- U.S. National Register of Historic Places
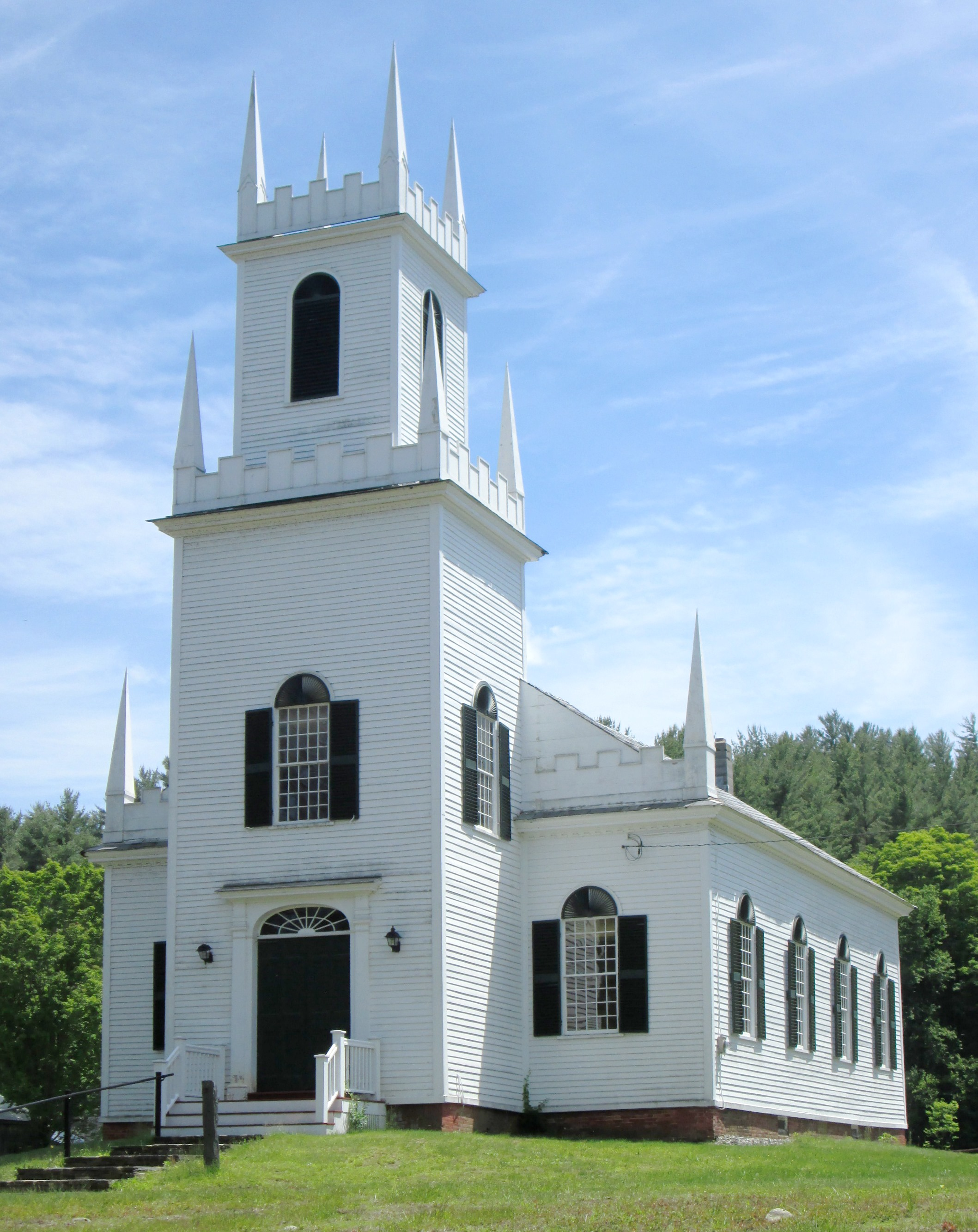
- (2013)

- Location within Vermont Location within the United States
- Location: Calvin Coolidge Mem. Hwy. (US Route 5) & Melendy Hill Rd. Guilford, Vermont
- Coordinates: 42°48′58″N 72°34′30″W
- Area: 2 acres (0.81 ha)
- Built: 1817
- Architectural style: Gothic Revival
- NRHP reference No.: 82001707
- Added to NRHP: May 13, 1982

Christ Church is a historic church located at Melendy Hill Road and US Route 5 in Guilford, Vermont, United States. Built in 1817 and later given Gothic Revival styling, it was the first Episcopal Church in Vermont. On May 13, 1982, it was added to the National Register of Historic Places. It is now owned by the Episcopal Diocese of Vermont and maintained by a local nonprofit organization.

== Description and history ==
Christ Church is set on a rise just south of Guilford's village center, overlooking Broad Brook and the junction of Melendy Hill Road and United States Route 5. It is a single-story wood-frame structure, with a gabled roof, clapboard siding, and a brick foundation. Its front facade is dominated by a projecting square tower, which rises 60 feet (18 m) in two stages. The tall lower stage has the main entrance, which is framed by pilasters and topped by a semi-oval fanlight window, at the base, and windows topped by half-round fans above, and is topped by a cornice and parapet with pinnacles at the corners. The smaller second stage houses the belfry, with rounded louver openings on each face, and is crowned by a similar parapet and pinnacles. The parapet and pinnacle detail is repeated across the rest of the main facade's cornice line.

The church was built in 1817 with local materials, and was originally a copy of an Episcopal church located in Greenfield, Massachusetts, which is no longer standing. The bronze bell was installed in 1830. In 1837 the building was given the overlay of Gothic Revival details it exhibits today. At that time the original raised pulpit was lowered to the dais, for which for of the original box pews were removed.

The church congregation was first part of the Episcopal Diocese of Massachusetts until the Episcopal Diocese of Vermont was created in 1832. It suffered a steady decline in size, reflecting that of the town itself. Christ Church ceased to be an active parish of the Episcopal Diocese of Vermont before the 1900s, but has never been deconsecrated and is still used occasionally for Episcopal church services. It has been restored and is now maintained by the Christ Church Guilford Society which uses it primarily as a venue for musical and other cultural events as well as weddings and civil unions.

== See also ==
- National Register of Historic Places listings in Windham County, Vermont
- Christ Church (disambiguation)
