= Christ Chapel =

Christ Chapel may refer to:

- Christ Chapel (Boise, Idaho)
- Christ Chapel (Gustavus Adolphus College)
- Christ Chapel (Hillsdale College)
- Christ Chapel (Seminary of the Southwest)

== See also ==
- Christ Church
- Christ the King Chapel (Christendom College)
