= Christ Church, Hastings =

The borough of Hastings in East Sussex, England, has three churches called Christ Church:

- Christ Church, Blacklands, Hastings serves the Blacklands suburb.
- Christ Church, Ore serves Ore and Ore Valley.
- Christ Church, St Leonards-on-Sea serves the formerly separate town of St Leonards-on-Sea.

== See also ==
- Christ Church (disambiguation)
