= Christ Church Cathedral =

Christ Church Cathedral is the name of many cathedrals around the world, and may refer to:

== Australia ==
- Christ Church Cathedral, Grafton, an Anglican cathedral in the Clarence Valley Council, New South Wales
- Christ Church Cathedral, Newcastle, an Anglican cathedral in the City of Newcastle, New South Wales

== Bahamas ==
- Christ Church Cathedral, Nassau, a cathedral in the Bahamas

== Canada ==
=== British Columbia ===
- Christ Church Cathedral (Vancouver)
- Christ Church Cathedral (Victoria, British Columbia)

=== New Brunswick ===
- Christ Church Cathedral (Fredericton)

=== Ontario ===
- Christ's Church Cathedral (Hamilton, Ontario)
- Christ Church Cathedral (Ottawa),

=== Quebec ===
- Christ Church Cathedral (Montreal)

=== Yukon ===
- Christ Church Cathedral (Whitehorse)

== China ==
- Christ Church, Cangxia, former cathedral of the Anglican Diocese of Fukien (Fujian)

== Falkland Islands ==
- Christ Church Cathedral (Falkland Islands)

== Ireland ==
- Christ Church Cathedral, Dublin
- Christ Church Cathedral, Waterford

== New Zealand ==
- Christ Church Cathedral, Christchurch
- Cathedral of the Blessed Sacrament, Christchurch, seat of the Roman Catholic Diocese of Christchurch
- Christ Church Cathedral, Nelson

== Tanzania ==
- Christ Church Cathedral, Zanzibar, Stone Town

== United Kingdom ==
- Cathedral and Metropolitical Church of Christ, Canterbury, the mother church of the Anglican Communion, also known as Canterbury Cathedral
- Christ Church Cathedral, Oxford, England (also the college chapel of Christ Church, Oxford)
  - Christ Church Cathedral School, Oxford, England
- Christ Church Cathedral, Lisburn, Northern Ireland

== United States ==
=== Alabama ===
- Christ Church Cathedral (Mobile, Alabama)

=== Connecticut ===
- Christ Church Cathedral (Hartford, Connecticut)

=== Indiana ===
- Christ Church Cathedral (Indianapolis)

=== Kentucky ===
- Christ Church Cathedral (Lexington, Kentucky)
- Christ Church Cathedral (Louisville, Kentucky)

=== Louisiana ===
- Christ Church Cathedral (New Orleans)

=== Massachusetts ===
- Christ Church Cathedral (Springfield, Massachusetts)

=== Missouri ===
- Christ Church Cathedral (St. Louis, Missouri)

=== Ohio ===
- Christ Church Cathedral (Cincinnati)

=== Tennessee ===
- Christ Church Cathedral (Nashville, Tennessee)

=== Texas ===
- Christ Church Cathedral (Houston)

=== Wisconsin ===
- Christ Church Cathedral (Eau Claire, Wisconsin)

== See also ==
- Christ Cathedral (disambiguation)
- Christ Church (disambiguation)
- Christchurch (disambiguation)
