= Christ Cathedral =

Christ Cathedral may refer to:

- Christ Cathedral (Garden Grove, California), part of the Roman Catholic Diocese of Orange in Orange County, California, formerly the Crystal Cathedral
- Christ Cathedral (Salina, Kansas), listed on the National Register of Historic Places

== See also ==
- Christ Church Cathedral (disambiguation)
