= Christ Church (Quincy, Massachusetts) =

Historic church in Massachusetts, United States

- U.S. National Register of Historic Places
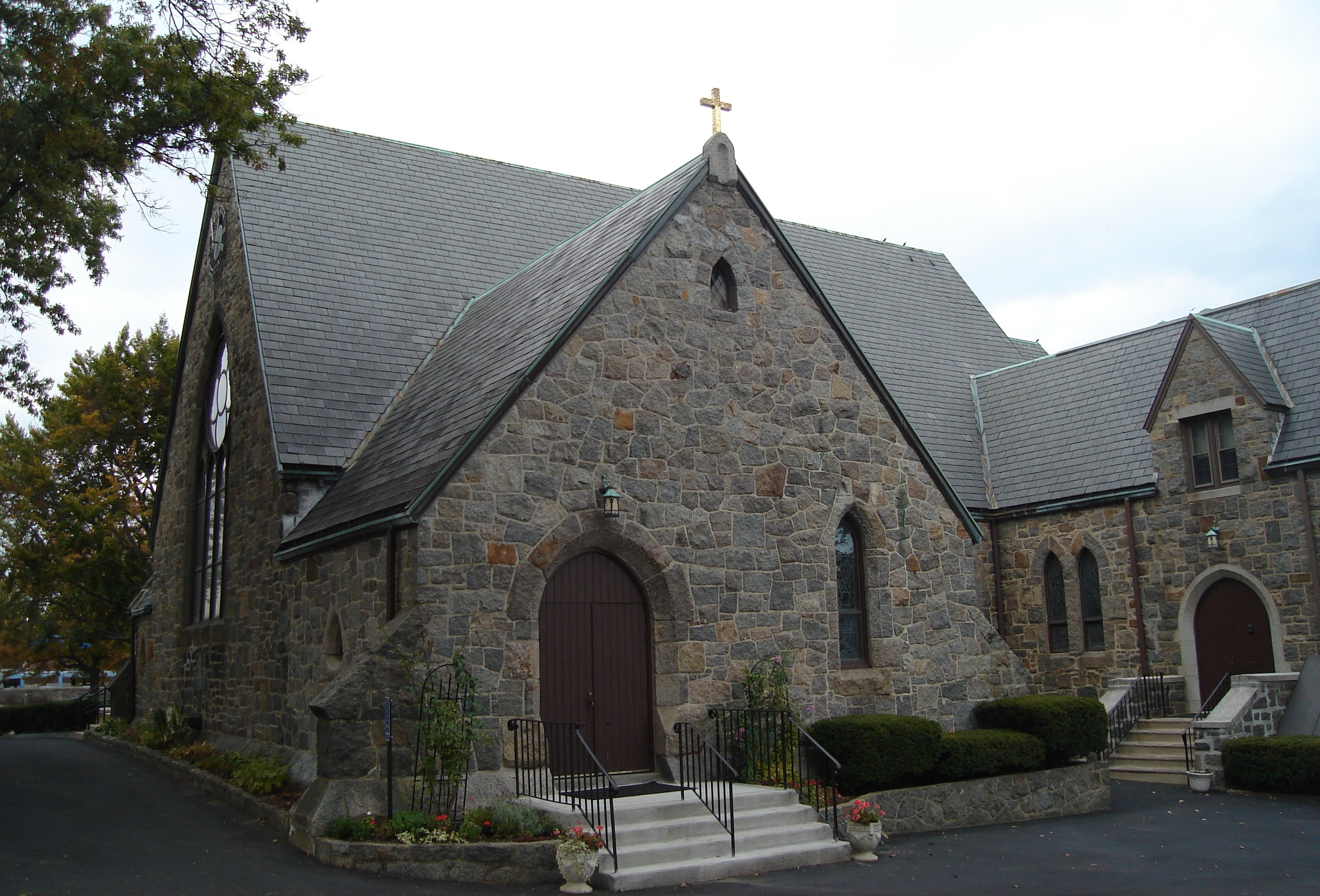

- Location within Massachusetts Location within the United States
- Location: 12 Quincy Ave., Quincy, Massachusetts
- Coordinates: 42°14′43″N 70°59′59″W
- Built: 1874
- Architectural style: Tudor Revival
- MPS: Quincy MRA
- NRHP reference No.: 89001369
- Added to NRHP: September 20, 1989

Christ Church is a historic church in Quincy, Massachusetts. It is a parish of the Episcopal Diocese of Massachusetts. The parish first congregated for lay-led services in 1689, and officially formed in 1704. It is believed to be the oldest continuously active Episcopal parish in Massachusetts. The building is a Tudor Revival structure constructed in 1874; it was listed on the National Register of Historic Places in 1989. The Rev. Clifford Brown is the current rector.

The church reported 159 members in 2017 and 88 members in 2023; no membership statistics were reported in 2024 parochial reports. Plate and pledge income reported for the congregation in 2024 was $64,378 with average Sunday attendance (ASA) of 52 persons.

== Description and history ==
Christ Church is set at the northeast corner of Quincy and Elm Streets, south of Quincy's central business district. It is built out of local granite, with a steeply pitched slate roof. The front-facing gable houses a large arched stained glass window, and the side walls have modest buttressing. Entry vestibules project to either side, in emulation of the English country churches its design recalls. A significant deviation from that style is the lack of a rounded apse; instead, that section of the church has a flat wall. A Tudor Revival parish house is attached to the rear. It is also built out of local granite, with heavy stone window sills and lintels and steep ridged roof gables.

The parish was formally organized in 1704 by Rev. William Barclay, when the area was still part of Braintree, and built its first church on School Street in 1727 (at the site of the Christ Church Burial Ground. It built a second frame church at the present site in 1832 and a stone one in 1859, both of which were destroyed by fire. The present church was built in 1874, in an English Revival style that was then in vogue for Episcopal churches.

== See also ==
- Christ Church Burial Ground (Quincy, Massachusetts)
- National Register of Historic Places listings in Quincy, Massachusetts
