= Christ Church, Cambridge =

Christ Church, Cambridge may refer to:

- Christ Church (Cambridge, Massachusetts) in the United States
- Christ Church Cambridge in England

== See also ==
- Christ's College, Cambridge
