= Christ Church (Middletown, New York) =

Historic church in New York, United States

- Unitarian Universalist Fellowship of Middletown, New York
- U.S. National Register of Historic Places
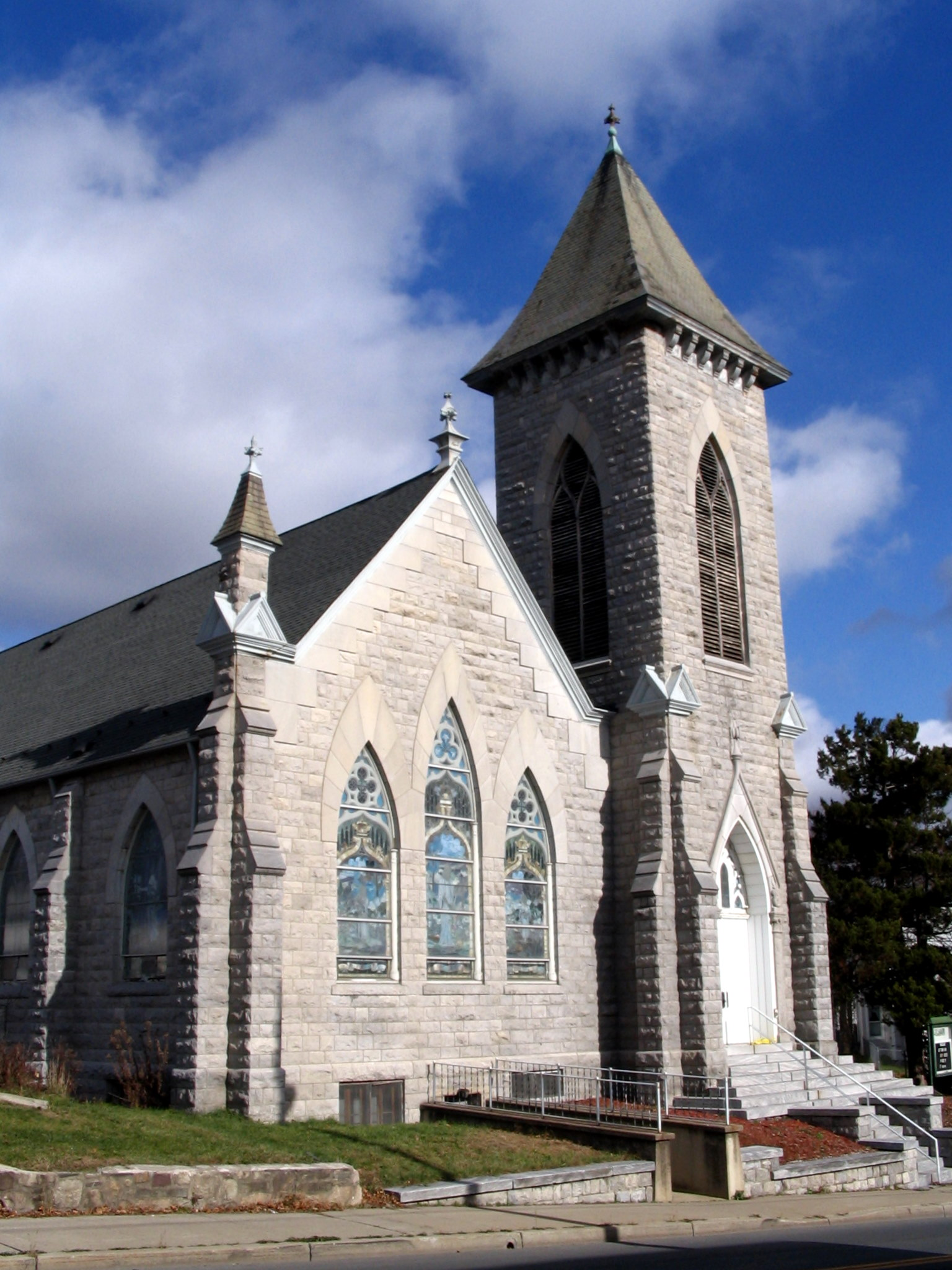
- Unitarian Universalist Fellowship, November 2008

- Location within New York Location within the United States
- Location: 6 Orchard St., Middletown, New York
- Coordinates: 41°26′45.45″N 74°25′3.9″W
- Area: 1 acre (0.40 ha)
- Built: 1901
- Architect: Lindsey, Frank J.; et al.
- Architectural style: Late Gothic Revival
- NRHP reference No.: 08000771
- Added to NRHP: August 15, 2008

Christ Church, more commonly known as the Unitarian Universalist Fellowship or First Universalist Church of Middletown is a historic Universalist church located at Middletown in Orange County, New York, United States. It was built in 1901. It features an offset bell tower and Tiffany glass memorial window. Also located on the property is an earlier frame parish house.

It was listed on the National Register of Historic Places in 2008.
