= History of Christchurch (disambiguation) =

History of Christchurch may refer to:

- History of Christchurch, New Zealand, history of the city in New Zealand
- History of Christchurch, Dorset, history of the town in Dorset, UK
