= Christ Church, Rawalpindi =

Church in Rawalpindi

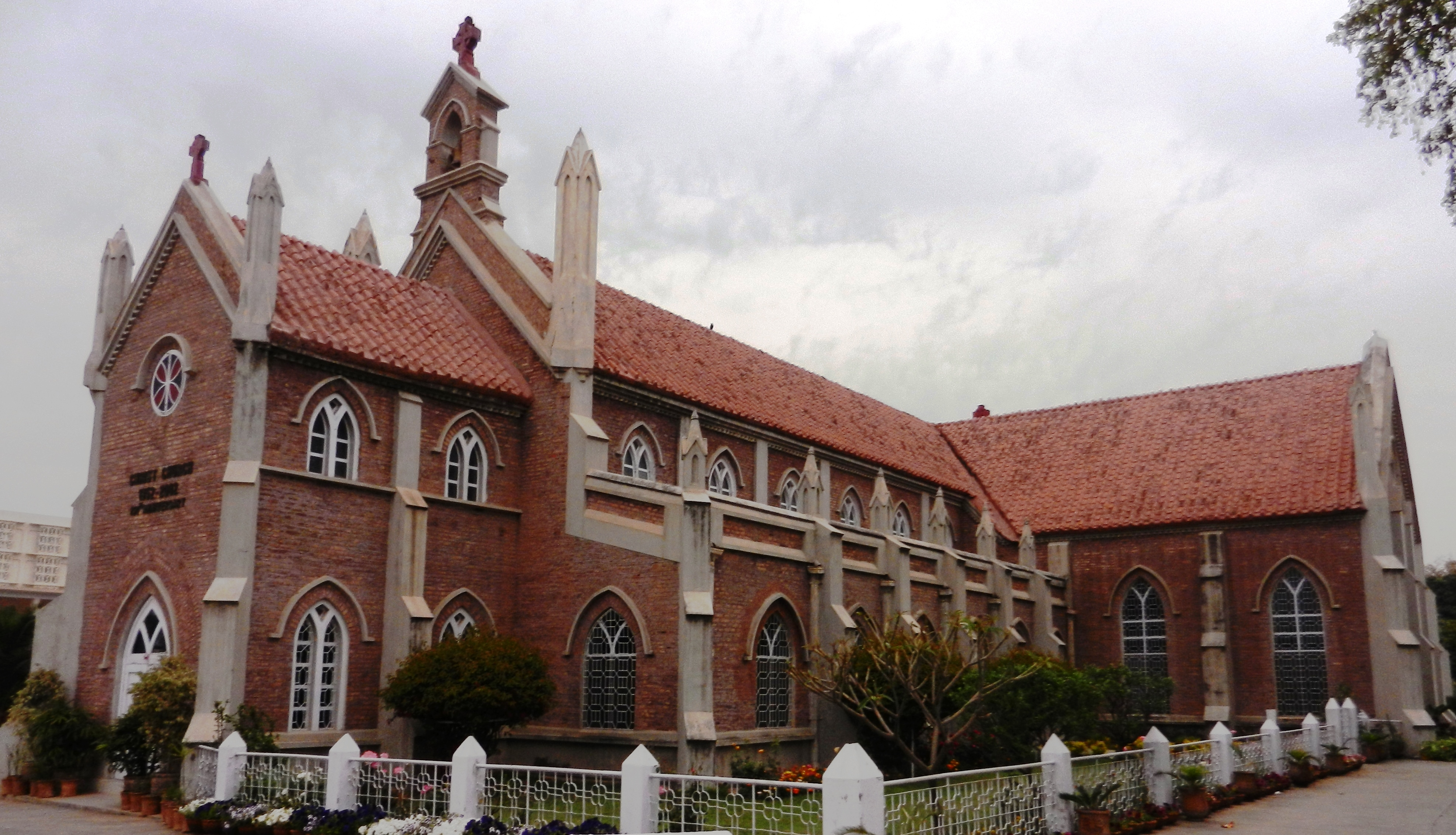
- A perspective view of Christ Church, Rawalpindi
- Christ Church, Rawalpindi
- 33°35′15″N 73°03′21″E
- Location: Rawalpindi, Punjab
- Country: Pakistan
- Denomination: Anglican

History
- Founded: 1852

Administration
- Diocese: Church of Pakistan

Christ Church is an Anglican church situated on the main square adjacent to the GHQ, formerly the British Northern Command Headquarters, in Rawalpindi, Pakistan.

It was completed in 1854 and is under the auspices of the Lahore Diocese of the Church of Pakistan.

== History ==
In 1851, the Marquis of Dalhousie authorized the permanent occupation of Rawalpindi, which lead to the stationing of Her Majesty’s 53rd Regiment. A year later, the foundation of Christ Church for the officers and troops was laid in 1852. Construction began in the same year and it was completed within two years in 1854. Before the construction of the church, a chapel was constructed to host services.

== Architecture ==
It was built in a classic cruciform plan in the Gothic style. The church has pointed arches, vaulted ceilings made of wood. It also has a bell tower, which was constructed from local brick and stone.

Its sanctuary is lit by stained glass windows on the east and west sides, which depict figures of Jesus Christ and the Virgin Mary. The liturgical furnishings, such as the altar, lectern, and pulpit, are made of wood and include carved details produced by artisans from Kashmir. A designated area contains a display which features a historical wooden Bible stand and preserved scriptures.

There is also a stone marker installed during the British period for geological surveying. It records mean sea level and was historically used for mapping purposes.

== Memorials ==
The interior walls contain marble and brass commemorative plaques honoring military personnel who died during campaigns on the North-West Frontier of India between the 1850s and the 1940s.
