= Christ Church, Queanbeyan =

Christ Church
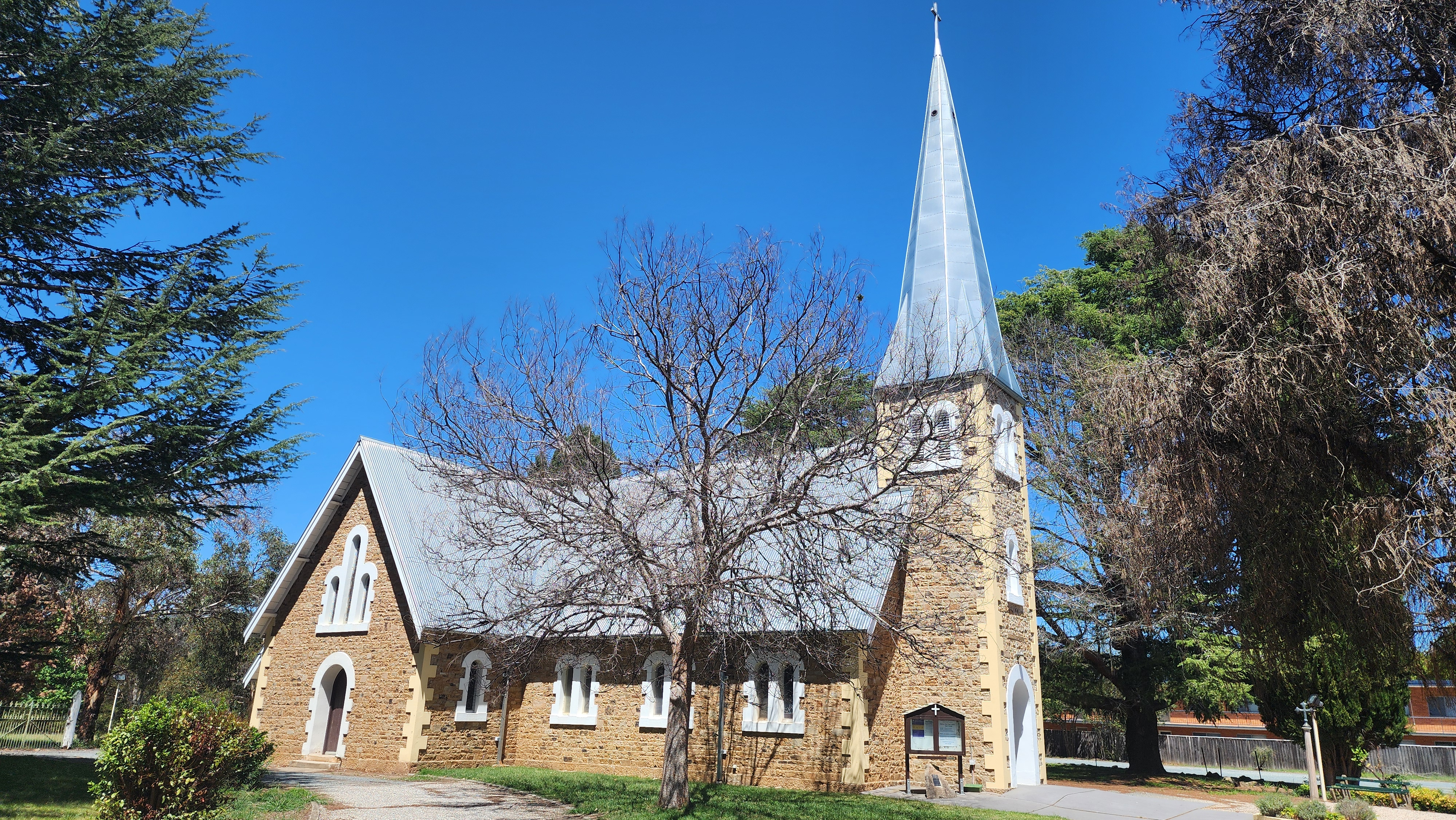
- Christ Church, pictured in 2025
- Christ Church
- 35°21′17″S 149°14′15″E
- Location: Rutledge Street, Queanbeyan, Queanbeyan-Palerang Region, New South Wales
- Country: Australia
- Denomination: Anglican
- Website: queanbeyananglican.org

History
- Status: Church
- Consecrated: 30 October 1861 by Bishop Frederic Barker

Architecture
- Functional status: Active
- Architect: Alberto Dies Soares
- Architectural type: Church
- Style: Victorian Ecclesiastical Gothic
- Years built: 1859–1860
- Construction cost: A£4,300

Administration
- Province: New South Wales
- Diocese: Canberra and Goulburn
- Parish: Queanbeyan and District

Clergy
- Rector: Rev'd Ian Marshall

New South Wales Heritage Register
- Official name: Christ Church Anglican Group
- Type: State heritage (complex / group)
- Designated: 2 April 1999
- Reference no.: 43
- Type: Church
- Category: Religion
- Builders: Daniel Jordan

Christ Church is a heritage-listed Anglican church at Rutledge Street, Queanbeyan, Queanbeyan-Palerang Region, New South Wales, Australia. It was built from 1859 to 1860. The property is owned by the Anglican Church Property Trust. It was added to the New South Wales State Heritage Register on 2 April 1999.

== History ==
=== Original church ===
Alberto Dies Soares, Anglican Minister to Queanbeyan from 1857 to 1877, was born on 26 November 1830, the fifth child of His Excellency, Manoel Joachim Soares, Knight Commander of the Cross of Christ in Portugal, and Camilla Mary Basset Lodington. His father was Portuguese and his mother English. Alberto Dies Soares received a sound education at Stoke, Newington, Mercantile & London University schools. He studied in Porto, Portugal and at the Putney College of Civil Engineers before finishing in Paris, France. In 1852, Soares sailed for Australia where he had an appointment with the New South Wales Government Railways as an engineer. En route he decided not to take up his position but to study for the ministry instead. Following three years of study he became an ordained Minister of the Church of England and was appointed to Collector as Assistant to the Rev. Robert Cartwright in 1855. The following year he became Deacon at Collector.

In 1857 Soares married Catherine Lane of Orton Park, Bathurst and on 18 May of that year he was transferred to Queanbeyan as the Parish Priest. Christ Church in those days was a small building, measuring a mere 44 by 24 feet (13 by 7 m). It had been opened for worship on Christmas Day 1844 on the same site where Christ Church now stands; it was not consecrated however, until the Bishop of Australia, Bishop William Broughton, officiated at the ceremony on 8 March 1845, just four days before he consecrated the Church of St John the Baptist, Canberra. A rather insignificant street, Broughton Place, in Queanbeyan, commemorated the Bishop's visit.

A report in the Goulburn Herald of 14 September 1859, stated that the old Church of England, Queanbeyan, had been razed to the ground and that a new building was rapidly being erected. Soares, an accomplished architect, set about to design a new church.

=== Current church ===
The Rev. Soares, whilst preparing the design and drawings, constructed a small scale model of his church-to-be. Although without its spire, the opening service at the new Christ church was held on 7 October 1860, with the sum of £860 still owing. The Golden Age of 15 September 1860 stated that the opening service took place at 11 am on Sunday 7 October. The same paper of 13 October 1860, indicated that Rev. A. D. Soares preached from Zachariah 4:6, whilst at the evening services, the Rev. P. G. Smith from Canberra, read from 2 Corinthians 6:16. The sum of £43 was collected at the opening services. On 2 March 1861 the spire was completed by the contractors, McLean and Ross at a cost of £336.

The new church was finally consecrated by Frederic Barker, the Bishop of Sydney on 30 October 1861. The contract to build the church was granted to Daniel Jordan. His son Thomas Jordan made the pews. The cost of the church was £4,300, whilst subscriptions and donations totalled £4,498. During the month of the opening, tiers of stepping stones, each weighing from 10 to 15 cwt, were laid across the river from the foot of Rutledge Street to where the Severne Flour Mill once stood, thus giving access to residents of Dodsworth and Irish Town to Christ Church School which had been built in 1843. The Rev. Soares met the cost of these stepping stones which were obtained from a source some three miles away and laid by Mr M O'Keefe.

Soares' other architectural achievement following his arrival in Queanbeyan was the beautiful Victorian Ecclesiastical Gothic of St Philip's at Bungendore; its foundation stone was laid in 1864. Next followed St Paul's at Burra which resulted from the initiative of Soares' brother, the Rev. Gualter Soares, who was a catechist and a schoolmaster at the Christ Church schoolhouse; St Paul's foundation stone was laid on 12 December 1867. After designing St Mark's at Hoskinstown, in 1872 he designed the chancery and extensions to the nave in the church of St John the Baptist, Canberra. He then proceeded with St Stephen's Presbyterian Church, Queanbeyan, (1872); St. Thomas', Carwoola. Next followed the Protestant Hall in Crawford Street which was opened in May 1877. Soares also re-designed the Queanbeyan Rectory and in 1865 was responsible for the brick addition to the old stone schoolhouse which still stands.

In 1877, after 20 years ministering in the Queanbeyan parish, Soares was transferred to Goulburn Cathedral and later became the Diocesan Architect. He was responsible for more than 35 churches, schools and parsonages in the Anglican Diocese of Goulburn.

Soares and his wife had five children, three girls and two boys. His first son Alberto died in 1860 as an infant and is buried in the Riverside Cemetery; his second son, also named Alberto, died at the age of 25 with no issue. Soares' father died in London in 1863 at the age of 37 and a brother Augusto died at the same time in London, aged 4. Soares died in 1909 at the age of 79 and is buried in the Waverley Cemetery.

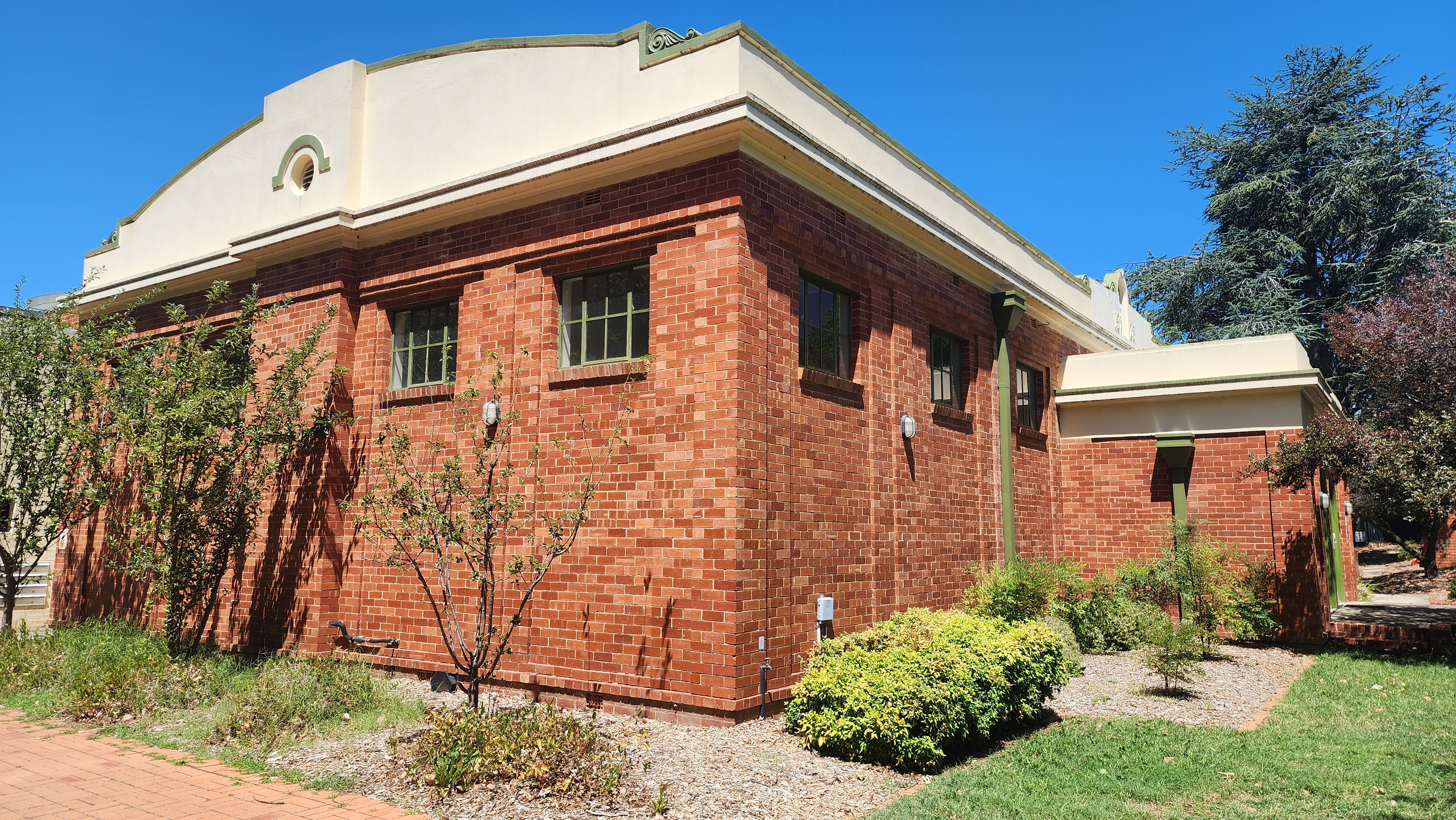
Parish Hall

=== Subsequent developments ===
In January 1978, vandals tried to burn down the church, but only the vestry door and a portion of the floor were destroyed.

In 1978 the Heritage Branch was advised by the Queanbeyan and District Historical Museum Society that a building application had been approved by Queanbeyan Council for the construction of a large and unsympathetic church hall on part of the site of Christ Church. The construction would involve the demolition of the original school and church buildings.

To enable guidance for the erection of a more sympathetically designed hall and control over the restoration of the school houses and stables, an Interim Conservation Order was made over the property on 24 November 1978. The placement of the order halted the development plans. A Permanent Conservation Order was placed over the property on 11 February 1983.

In 1997, the church received heritage approval to install a pair of pictorial stained glass windows, replacing a pair of lead-lighted cathedral glass windows in the central north side. In 1991 through the Heritage Assistance program a matched grant was provided to assist in the replacement of part of the floor of the church and electrical re-wiring. The PCO listing was transferred to the State Heritage Register on 2 April 1999.

== Description ==
The Christ Church Group consists of a fine Gothic Revival Church, a rectory, stable and school houses.

The precinct covers an area of approximately one hectare (two acres) and is a picturesque landmark in Queanbeyan.

The Church is a fine example of a Gothic Revival church. It has a cruciform plan with a tower and broached spire at the west end. The walls are of rock faced random stone with dressed quoins and window surrounds. A shingle roof was replaced by iron about 1890. This church was built to replace the earlier one now used as a Sunday School.

The original church building is a simple, small building of stone rubble construction with a gabled iron roof. It was consecrated in 1845 and is reported to be the oldest known building in Queanbeyan.

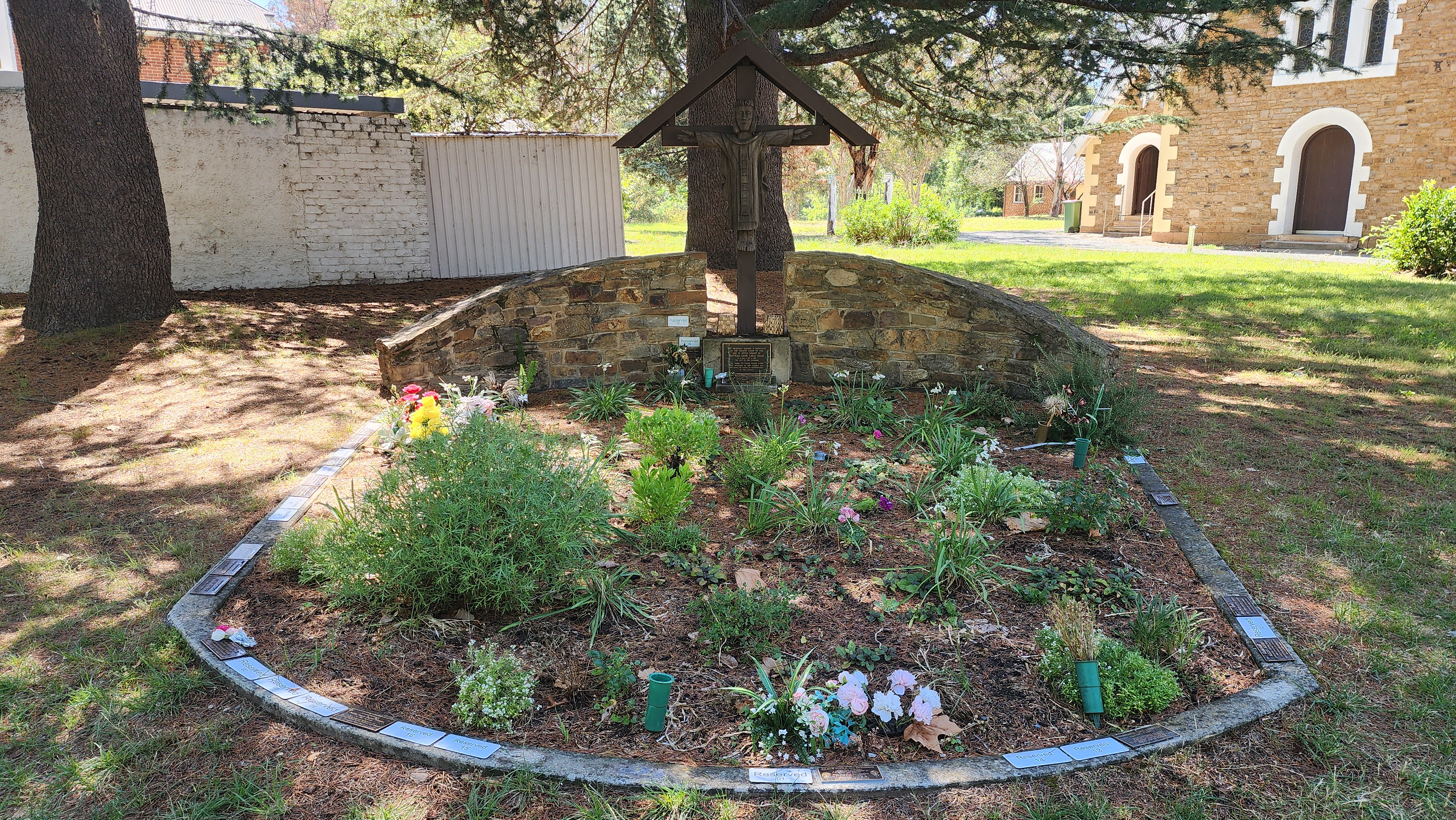
Matilda Jane Ellis Memorial

== Heritage listing ==
The Church is an important landmark within a group of public buildings in the centre of Queanbeyan. It represents a consolidation of the city centre and of the Anglican faith in the region. The Hall is important for its contribution to historic streetscapes and the application of technical details such as cement render and locally (Canberra) made bricks. Its use as a community facility forms a basis for sentimental attachments to the building.

Christ Church Anglican was listed on the New South Wales State Heritage Register on 2 April 1999 having satisfied the following criteria.

The place is important in demonstrating the course, or pattern, of cultural or natural history in New South Wales.

The Church is an important landmark within a group of public buildings in the centre of Queanbeyan. It represents a consolidation of the city centre, and the Anglican faith in the region.

The place is important in demonstrating aesthetic characteristics and/or a high degree of creative or technical achievement in New South Wales.

The Hall is important for its contribution to historic streetscapes and the application of technical details such as cement render and locally (Canberra) made bricks.

The place has strong or special association with a particular community or cultural group in New South Wales for social, cultural or spiritual reasons.

Its use as a community facility forms a basis for sentimental attachments to the building.

== See also ==
- List of Anglican churches in New South Wales
- Australian non-residential architectural styles
