= Christchurch railway station =

Christchurch railway station or Christchurch station may refer to:

- Christchurch railway station, New Zealand, a railway station in Christchurch, New Zealand
- Christchurch railway station (England), a railway station in Christchurch, Dorset, United Kingdom
  - Christchurch railway station (1862–1886), the original station in Christchurch, Dorset, on the Ringwood, Christchurch and Bournemouth Railway
