= Christ Church USA =

Christian congregation in the United States

Christ Church USA is a non-denominational Christian congregation composed of people from diverse racial, cultural, and ethnic backgrounds. It is a community minded congregation with a global sensitivity. Christ Church exists to "Unite People to God and People to People". The Lord continues to be a source of transformation for every person who comes through its doors. It is the hope of Christ Church that spiritual needs will be met, and that physical and emotional concerns are addressed as God is sought through praise and worship.

Christ Church came into existence in June 1986 when Pastors David and Marlinda Ireland joined hearts with six other adults who were committed to seeing the gospel of Jesus Christ heal broken lives. Throughout the years, as the congregation began to thrive, it became necessary to rent facilities to accommodate the growth. The rental of temporary facilities throughout New Jersey contributed greatly to the dramatic growth as well as to the diversity of the congregation.

In 1994, the congregation reached approximately 500 members and after nearly eight years of renting, it became necessary to find a permanent home for the ministry. In October of the same year, Christ Church acquired and began restoration on the present facility, a 900-seat Romanesque Cathedral in Montclair, New Jersey.

Pastors David and Marlinda's vision for the region increased over time. This led to the purchase of a 107-acre campus in Rockaway, New Jersey which was renovated and opened for worship in 2009; complementing the metropolitan cathedral in Montclair. It is also the location of the administrative offices. To keep pace with the demands of the ministry, the church developed a full-time staff with responsibilities ranging from accounting and finance, community development, media production, counseling, administration of children's ministries to pastoral care. This broad-based staff, along with over 1,200 volunteer leaders, and hundreds of other volunteers affords the opportunity to provide a myriad of services to the community and church family.

Today, the church family has several thousand families, representing approximately 70 different nationalities. To accommodate the needs and schedules of the congregation, Christ Church offers a number of weekend worship services along with various classes and small group activities for weekly bible-based instruction.
