= Christ Church, Ware =

Church in Hertfordshire, England

Coordinates: 51.8116°N 0.0286°W

Christ Church
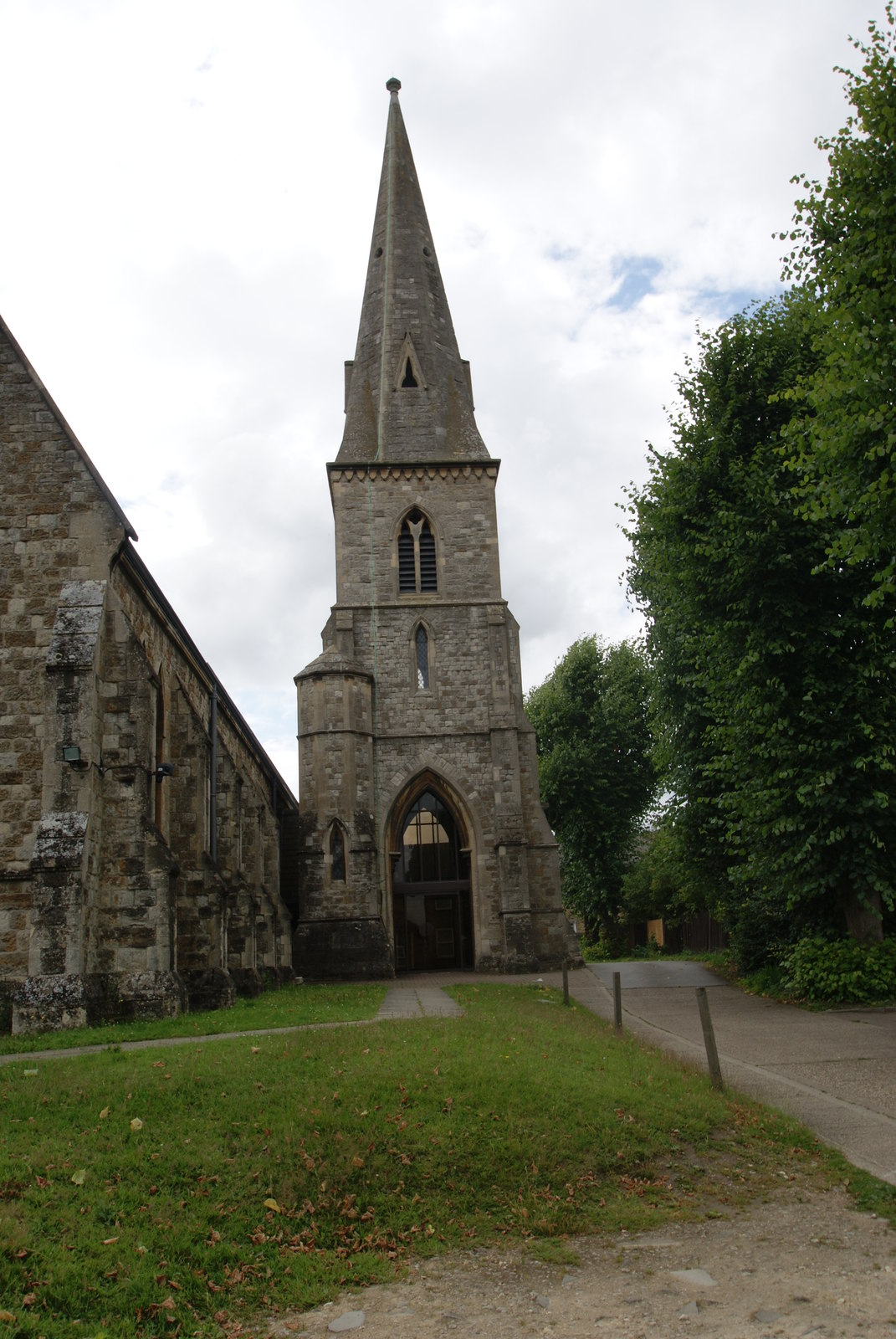

- Shown within Hertfordshire
- OS grid reference: TL 35995 14386
- Country: England
- Denomination: Church of England
- Tradition: Evangelical
- Website: www.christchurchware.co.uk

Architecture
- Heritage designation: Grade II listed
- Designated: 14 Mar 1974
- Architect: Nehemiah Edward Stevens
- Years built: 1858

Administration
- Province: Canterbury
- Diocese: St Albans

Christ Church is a Church of England church in Ware, Hertfordshire, England. The parish was formed out of the ancient parish in 1858 and covers the East and South sides of Ware. The building was consecrated in 1858 and is grade II listed.
