= Christ Church Anglo-Indian Higher Secondary School =

Christ Church Anglo Indian Higher Secondary School
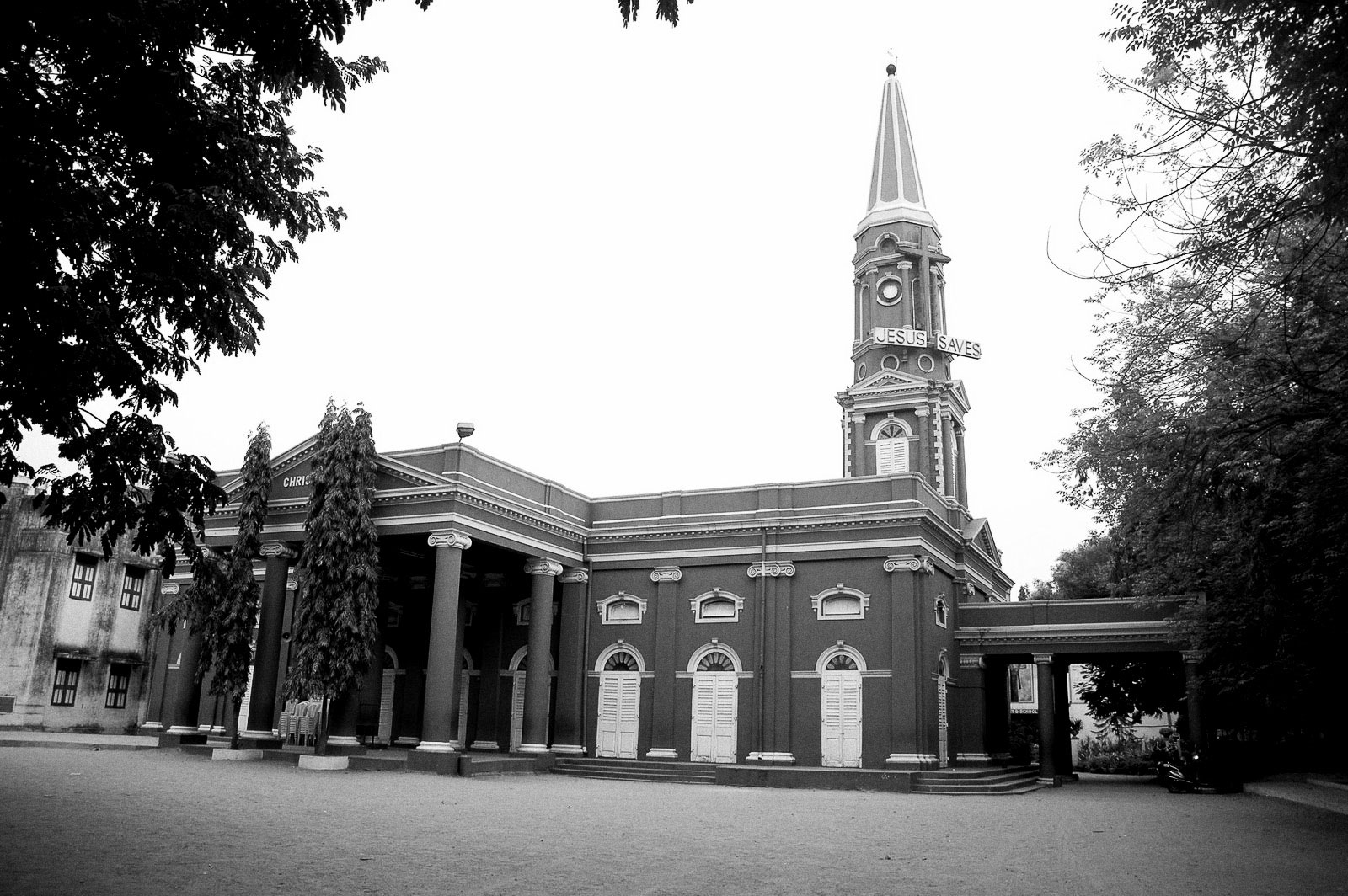

Location
- Anna Salai, Chennai, Tamil Nadu; India
- Coordinates: 13.0657°N 80.2701°E

Information
- Other names: Christ Church
- Type: Co-educational
- Motto: Do your Best
- Established: 1842; 184 years ago
- Headmaster: B. Emerson John Durairaj
- Chaplain: Rev. Dr.R.Richard Harrison
- Staff: 40
- Grades: 1 to Grade 12
- Enrollment: 1000+
- Campus size: 1.5 Acre
- Colors: Red, blue, green, yellow
- Affiliation: Anglo-Indian School Leaving Certificate (A.I.S.L.C) For classes 1 to 10.

Christ Church Anglo-Indian higher Secondary School is located in Anna Salai, Chennai, India.

== History ==
The School came into being in 1842 AD during the historic days of the East India Company. The land was gifted by (late) Mr. Thomas Parker Waller to build a Church. In the year 1844, two Schools were established which were known as the Mount Road District Schools. Boys and Girls were taught separately. The Highest class was the Fourth Form. The Schools were recognized by the government as Middle Schools. The Subjects taught were Scripture, Catechism, History of Greece and Rome, Composition Writing, Dictating, Syntax, Book Keeping, Mental Arithmetic, Hindustani and Tamil. The Schools were merged into a single school in 1905 and was recognized by the government as a European School.

With the help of grants from the British Government and the European School Improvement Association, a new block consisting of five class rooms was added in 1928 at a cost of ₹40,000 Additional buildings have been added for a growing school and the church has been renovated.

== A New Beginning ==
In 1947, the school acquired the status of a high school. Since then, it has been serving the residents of the neighbourhood and beyond. With the introduction of the Higher Secondary section in the academic year 1985–86, the history of the school took a new and exciting turn.

Christ Church was the first school to be commissioned for traffic patrol in South India in 1966. It consisted of 52 students — 28 boys and 24 girls. In the 1970s, the school had tied up with the Chennai police to regulate traffic and assist pedestrians on Mount Road. The students of the school would turn up smartly dressed in white with red berets and gloves and would enthusiastically regulate traffic.

Prominent activities by the school that were meant for wider world included Shakespearean plays hosted at the Museum Theatre by students. These plays were directed by David Samuel and were highly appreciated by the public. Of course, the plays were produced with hours of labour and practice, with Mr. Samuel spending hours at the piano conceptualising and producing these classical plays. The sets and the costumes were created and produced by the Samuel couple, who dedicated their lives to the service of the school.

The school has produced many illustrious alumni, including principals of well-known schools such as DAV Chennai. John Varghese, the principal of St Stephen's College, Delhi, is an old student. The school has also produced well-known musicians, actors and has added significantly to the cultural life of Madras.

Then, there are students who have served the country in the Navy and the Air Force, have joined the bureaucracy including the Indian Foreign Service and the Customs as well as Information Service.

== Former Principals and Correspondents ==
Name	Designation
Late Mr. B.H.Mulley, M.A.., L.T.	Principal (1930-1933)
Late Mr. D.V. Peters, M.A., L.T.	Principal (1934-1935)
Late Mr.John Asirvatham, B.A.., L.T.	Principal & Correspondent (1930-1958)
Late Mr.David Samuel, B.A.L.T.	Principal & Correspondent (1959-1973)
Late Mr.J.R.Kenneth, B.sc., L.T.	Head master (1974)
Late Mr.V.Abraham, M.A., B.T.	Head Master (1975-1992)
Late Mr.W.G. Shepherd, M.A., B.T.	Headmaster-in-charge (1992-1995)
Late Mr.Collin Raymond, MA	Correspondent (1995-2002)
Mr.K.John Freddy, B.sc, M.A, M.Ed., M.Phil.	Headmaster (1995-2002)
Rev.Dr.R.Richard Harrison, M.A., M.com., M.Ed., D.D., Ph.D.,	Headmaster (2002-2010)
Mrs. Helen Devadas M.Sc., B.Ed.,	Headmistress In-Charge (2010-2011)
Mrs.Shirley Jayakumar, B.A., B.Ed.,	Headmistress In-Charge (2011-2014)

== Facilities ==
The school enrolls children from kindergarten to class 10 for the Anglo Indian System and the Tamil Nadu State Board for classes 11 and 12. A Library, a Computer Lab are among some of the facilities. The medium of instruction is English.

== School Houses ==
The students are divided into four houses for the competitions and sports activities held in the school. The four houses Charter, Eton, Harrow and Rugby were named after schools in England.

House	House colour
Charter	
Rugby	
Harrow	
Eton	

== Information ==
- On 26 November 2017, Christ Church celebrated its 175th anniversary
