= Christ's College =

Christ's College may refer to:

- Christ's College, Cambridge, England, UK
- Christ's College of Education, now part of Liverpool Hope University, England, UK
- Christ's College, Finchley, London, England, UK
- Christ's College, Guildford, England, UK
- Christ's College, Aberdeen, Scotland, UK
- Christ's College, Christchurch, New Zealand

== See also ==
- Christ's College (disambiguation)
