= Christ's Church =

Christ's Church may refer to:

== Churches in Canada ==
- Christ's Church Cathedral (Hamilton, Ontario)

== Churches in China ==
- Christ's Church, Changsha
- Christ's Church, Changshu
- Christ's Church, Changzhou in Jiangsu
- Christ's Church, Fuyang District in Hangzhou, Zhejiang
- Christ's Church, Jinan in Shandong
- Christ's Church, Jinyuan in Shanxi
- Christ's Church, Tangxi in Hangzhou, Zhejiang
- Christ's Church, Mochou Road in Nanjing, Jiangsu
- Christ's Church, Nanjing in Jiangsu
- Daosheng Christ's Church in Gulou District of Nanjing, Jiangsu
- Christ's Church, Qingdao in Shandong
- Christ's Church, Shenzhen
- Christ's Church, Shangcheng District in Hangzhou, Zhejiang
- Christ's Church, Siming District in Xiamen, Fujian
- Christ's Church, Tianshui Subdistrict in Hangzhou, Zhejiang
- Christ's Church, Ürümqi in Ürümqi, Xinjiang
- Christ's Church, Wuxi in Jiangsu

== Churches in Lithuania ==
- Christ's Resurrection Church, Kaunas

== Churches in Peru ==
- Church of the Holy Christ of Wonders (Lima)

== Churches in Scotland ==
- Cill Chriosd

== Churches in the United States ==
=== Alabama ===
- Christ's Church (Birmingham)

=== Arizona ===
- Christ's Church (Parker)
- Christ's Church of the Valley (Peoria)
- Christ's Church (Phoenix)

=== Arkansas ===
- Christ's Church (Fayetteville)

=== California ===
- Christ's Church (San Dimas)

=== Colorado ===
- Christ's Church (Evergreen)

=== Florida ===
- Christ's Church, Jacksonville
- Christ's Church, Fleming Island
- Christ's Church (Ocala)

=== Georgia ===
- Christ's Church, Camden County

=== Hawaii ===
- Christ's Church (Kapolei)

=== Illinous ===
- Christ's Church (Effingham)

=== Indiana ===
- Christ's Church (Ft. Wayne)
- Christ's Church (Butler)

=== Kansas ===
- Christ's Church (Holton)

=== Missouri ===
- Christ's Church (St. Peters)

=== New York ===
- Christ's Church (Brooklyn)
- Christ's Church (Rye)

=== Ohio ===
- Christ's Church (Mason)

=== Oregon ===
- Christ's Church (Monmouth)

=== Pennsylvania ===
- Christ's Church (Greensburg, Pennsylvania)
- Christ's Church (Royersford)

=== Tennessee ===
- Christ's Church (Chattanooga)

=== Utah ===
- Christ's Church (The Righteous Branch)

=== Washington ===
- Christ's Church (Federal Way)

== See also ==
- Church (building), a building used for worship in Christianity
- Christ Church (disambiguation)
- Church of Christ (disambiguation)
- Christian Church (disambiguation)
