= CCFI =

CCFI may refer to:

- China Containerized Freight Index (also known as Chinese Containerized Freight Index or Shanghai Containerised Freight Index), a type of economic transport shipping index. See Container Freight Swap Agreement
- Chambre de Commerce France-Israel (English: France-Israel Chamber of Commerce), see Paris Île-de-France Regional Chamber of Commerce and Industry
- Christ's Church Fleming Island, see Christ's Church, Jacksonville, Florida
