= Christ's Church, Jinan =

- 济南基督教堂
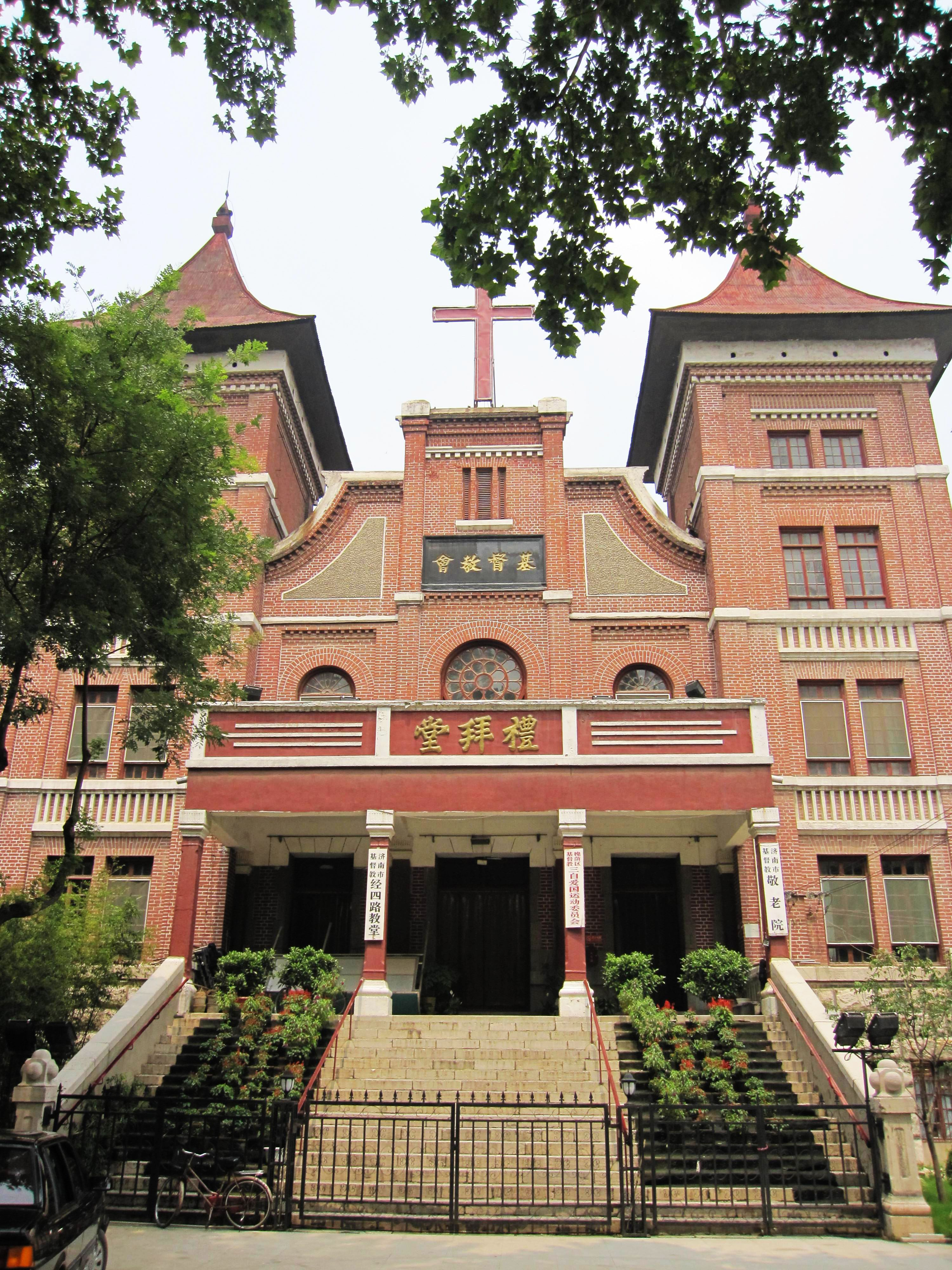
- Christ's Church, Jinan in 2009

- Location in Shandong
- 36°39′59″N 116°59′33″E
- Location: Huaiyin District, Jinan, Shandong, China
- Denomination: Protestantism

History
- Status: Parish church
- Founded: 1913
- Founder: Liu Shoushan

Architecture
- Functional status: Active
- Architect: Li Honggen
- Architectural type: Church building
- Groundbreaking: 1924
- Completed: 1926 (reconstruction)

Specifications
- Materials: Granite, bricks

Chinese name
- Simplified Chinese: 济南基督教堂
- Traditional Chinese: 濟南基督教堂
Transcriptions
Standard Mandarin
- Hanyu Pinyin: Jǐnán Jīdūjiàotáng

Alternative Chinese name
- Simplified Chinese: 经四路自立会礼拜堂
- Traditional Chinese: 經四路自立會禮拜堂
Transcriptions
Standard Mandarin
- Hanyu Pinyin: Jīngsìlù Zìlìhuì Lǐbàitáng

Christ's Church, Jinan (Chinese: 济南基督教堂) is a Protestant church located in Huaiyin District, Jinan, Shandong, China.

== History ==
In the early 20th century, Liu Shoushan (刘寿山), a real estate developer and believer in Qingdao, Shandong, initiated the establishment of the Shandong Chinese Independent Christian Church. In 1913, he purchased land in Jinan Commercial Port to establish a chapel, which was completed in 1915. An extension of the church, designed by Li Honggen (李洪根), commenced in 1924 and was completed in 1926. With a construction area of more than 1,300 square metres (14,000 sq ft), it can accommodate more than 1,000 believers.

In October 2013, it was inscribed as a provincial cultural relic preservation organ by the Shandong government.
