= Christian Church (disambiguation) =

Christian Church refers to what different Christian denominations conceive of as being the true body of Christians or the original institution established by Jesus.

Christian Church may also refer to:

- Individual denominations within Christianity, which are also sometimes called Christian churches
- Individual buildings which are used as places of worship in Christianity

== Individual denominations by name ==
- Christian Church (Disciples of Christ), a mainline Protestant denomination in the United States and Canada with roots in the Restoration Movement
  - Christian Church (Disciples of Christ) in Canada, the Canadian region of the Christian Church (Disciples of Christ)
- Christian Churches and Churches of Christ, a nondenominational group of Restoration Movement congregations that share common ideological and historical roots
- Christian Church in Luwuk Banggai, a Reformed denomination in Indonesia, a member of the World Communion of Reformed Churches
- Christian Church of Southern Sumatra, a Protestant church in Indonesia, based on the southern part of the island of Sumatra
- Christian Church of Sumba, a Calvinist church in Indonesia, a member of World Communion of Reformed Churches
- Christian Churches Ireland, a Pentecostal denomination and a part of the World Assemblies of God Fellowship

== Buildings ==
- Christian Church (Boise, Idaho), listed on the U.S. National Register of Historic Places (NRHP)
- Christian Church (East Delhi, New York), listed on the NRHP

== See also ==
- Christ's Church (disambiguation)
- Church of Christ (disambiguation)
- Church (disambiguation)
- Churches of Christ, a nondenominational group of Restoration Movement congregations that share common ideological and historical roots, often distinguished by their prohibition of instrumental music in worship
