= Christ's Church, Fuyang District =

- 富阳区基督教堂
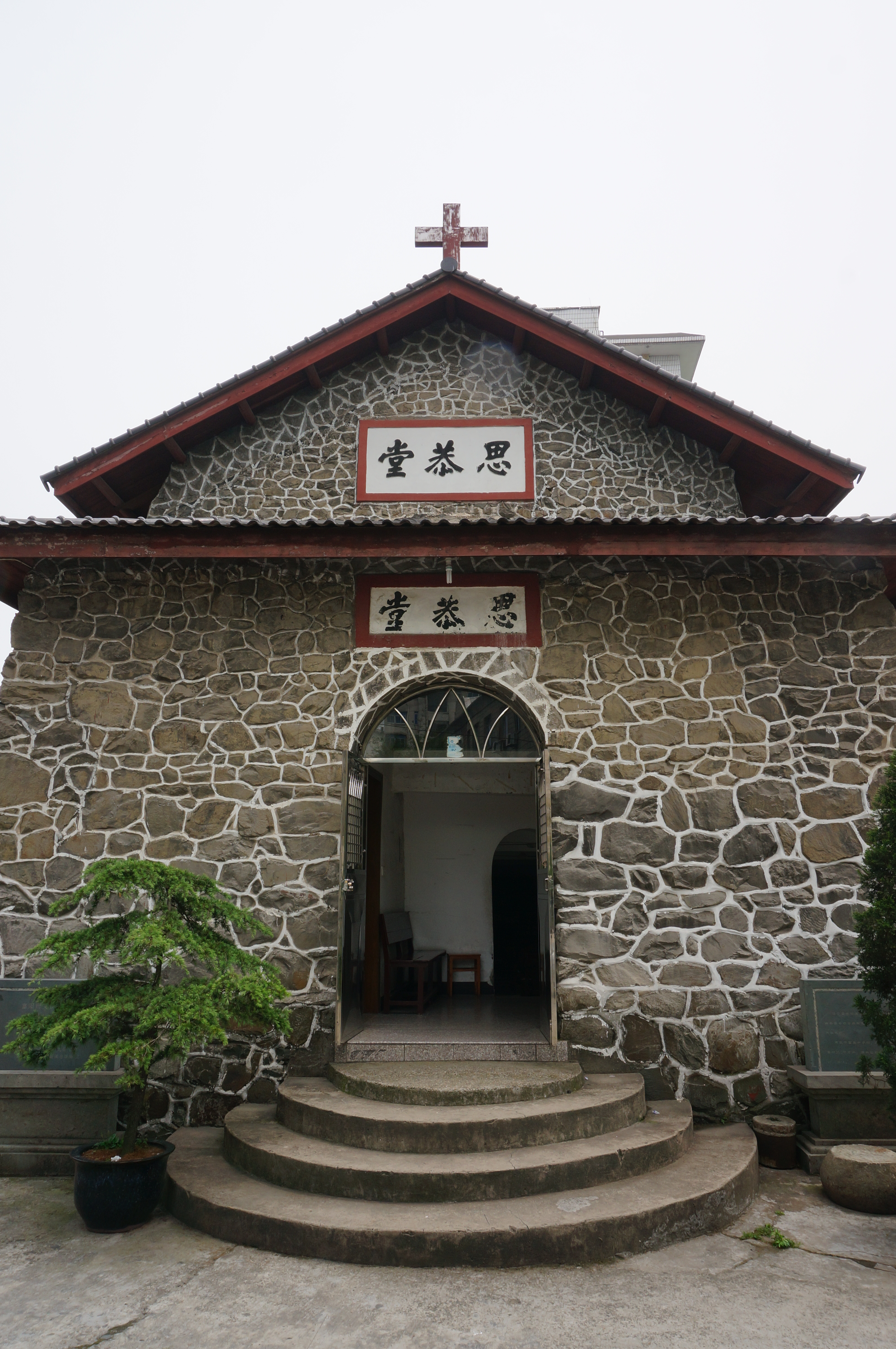
- Christ's Church, Fuyang District in 2015

- Location in Zhejiang
- 30°03′11″N 119°58′12″E
- Location: Fuyang District, Hangzhou, Zhejiang, China
- Denomination: Protestantism

History
- Status: Church
- Founded: 1910

Architecture
- Functional status: Active
- Architectural type: Church building

Specifications
- Materials: Granite, bricks, wood

Chinese name
- Simplified Chinese: 富阳区基督教堂
- Traditional Chinese: 富陽區基督教堂
Transcriptions
Standard Mandarin
- Hanyu Pinyin: Fùyángqū Jīdūjiàotáng

Sigong Christian Church
- Chinese: 思恭堂
Transcriptions
Standard Mandarin
- Hanyu Pinyin: Sīgōng Táng

Christ's Church, Fuyang District (Chinese: 富阳区基督教堂), locally known as Sigong Christian Church (思恭堂), is a Protestant church located in Fuyang District, Hangzhou, Zhejiang, China.

== History ==
The church was built by the Anglican church in 1910.

== Gallery ==
Exterior of the church
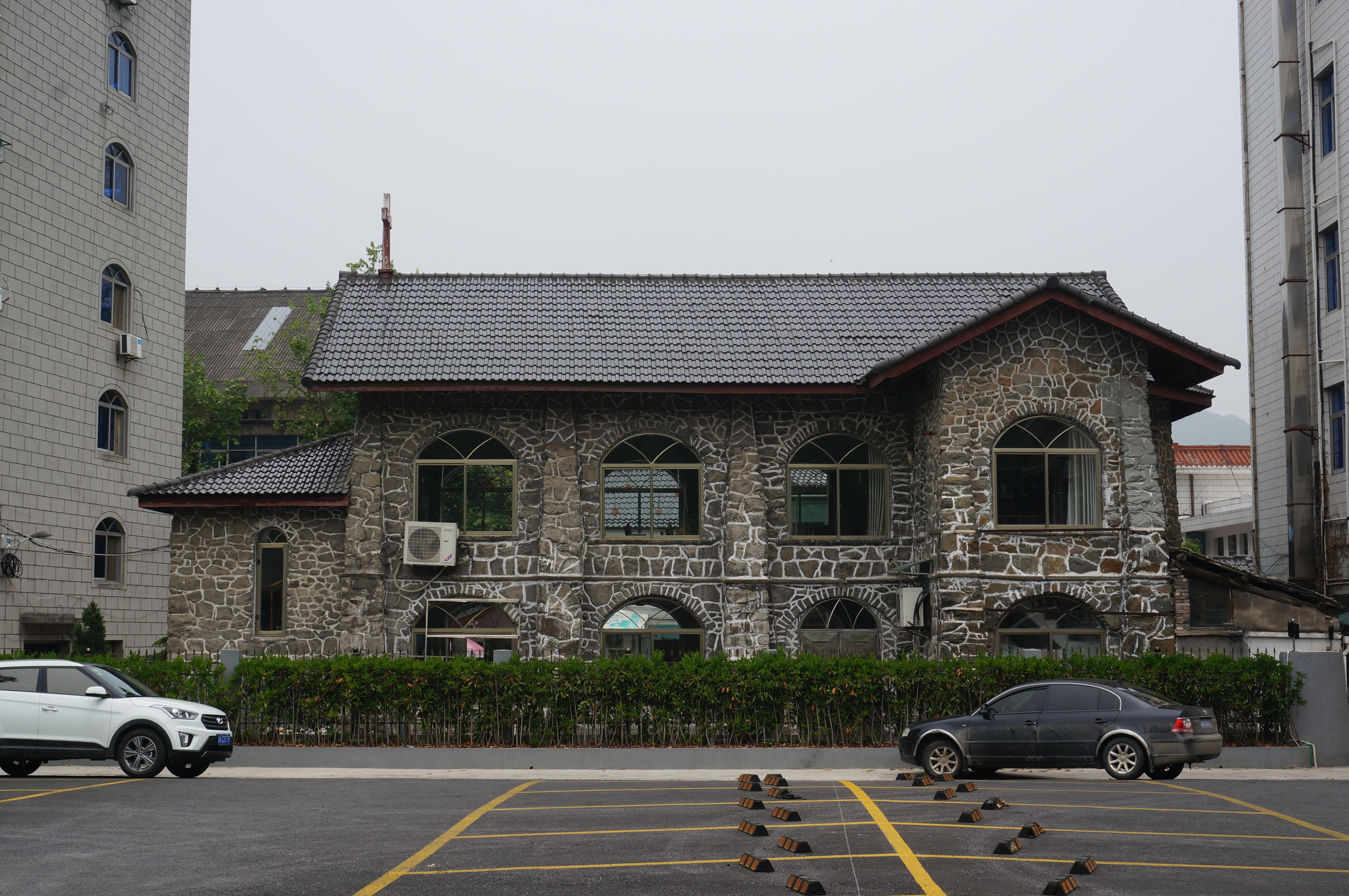
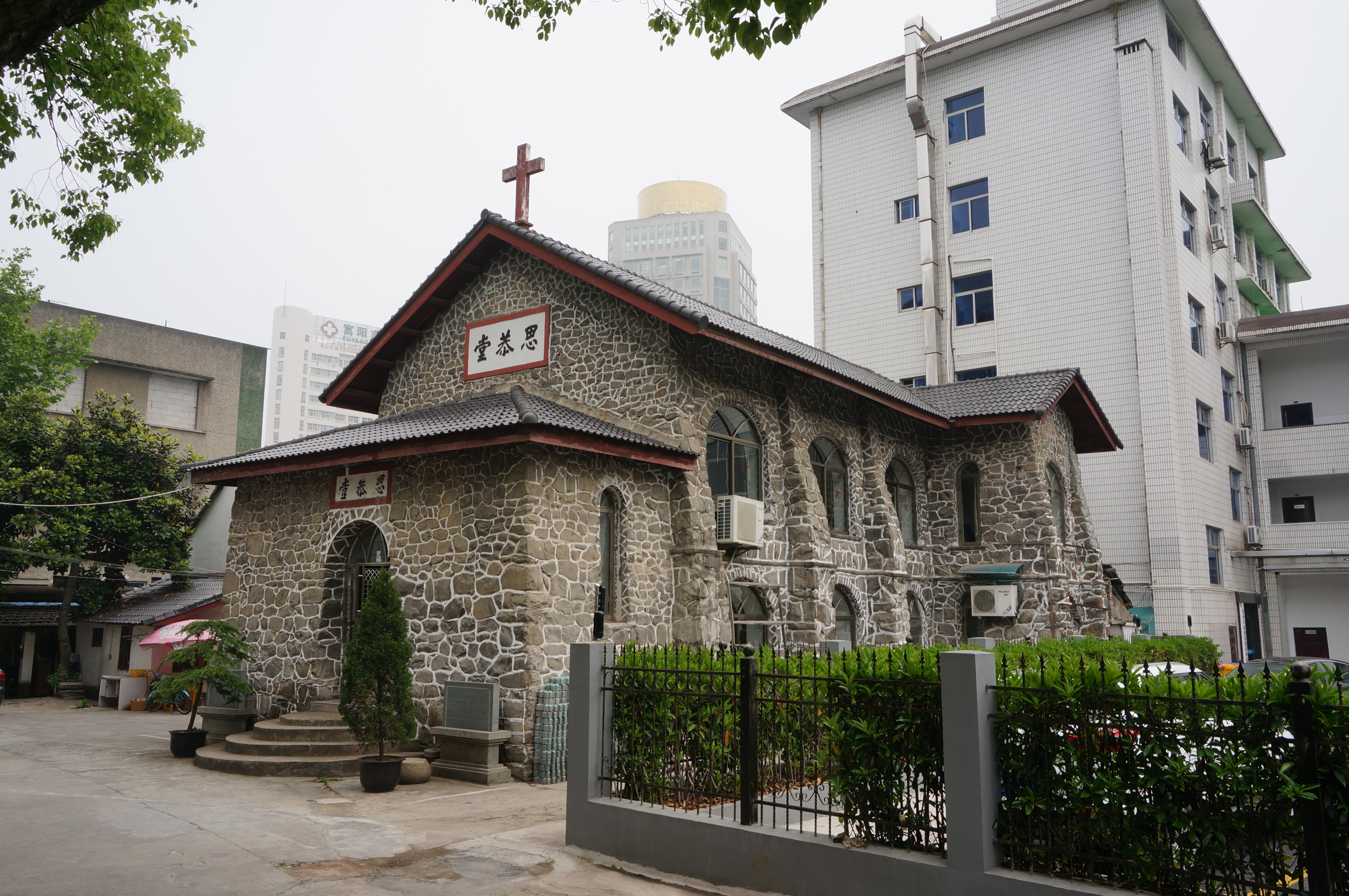
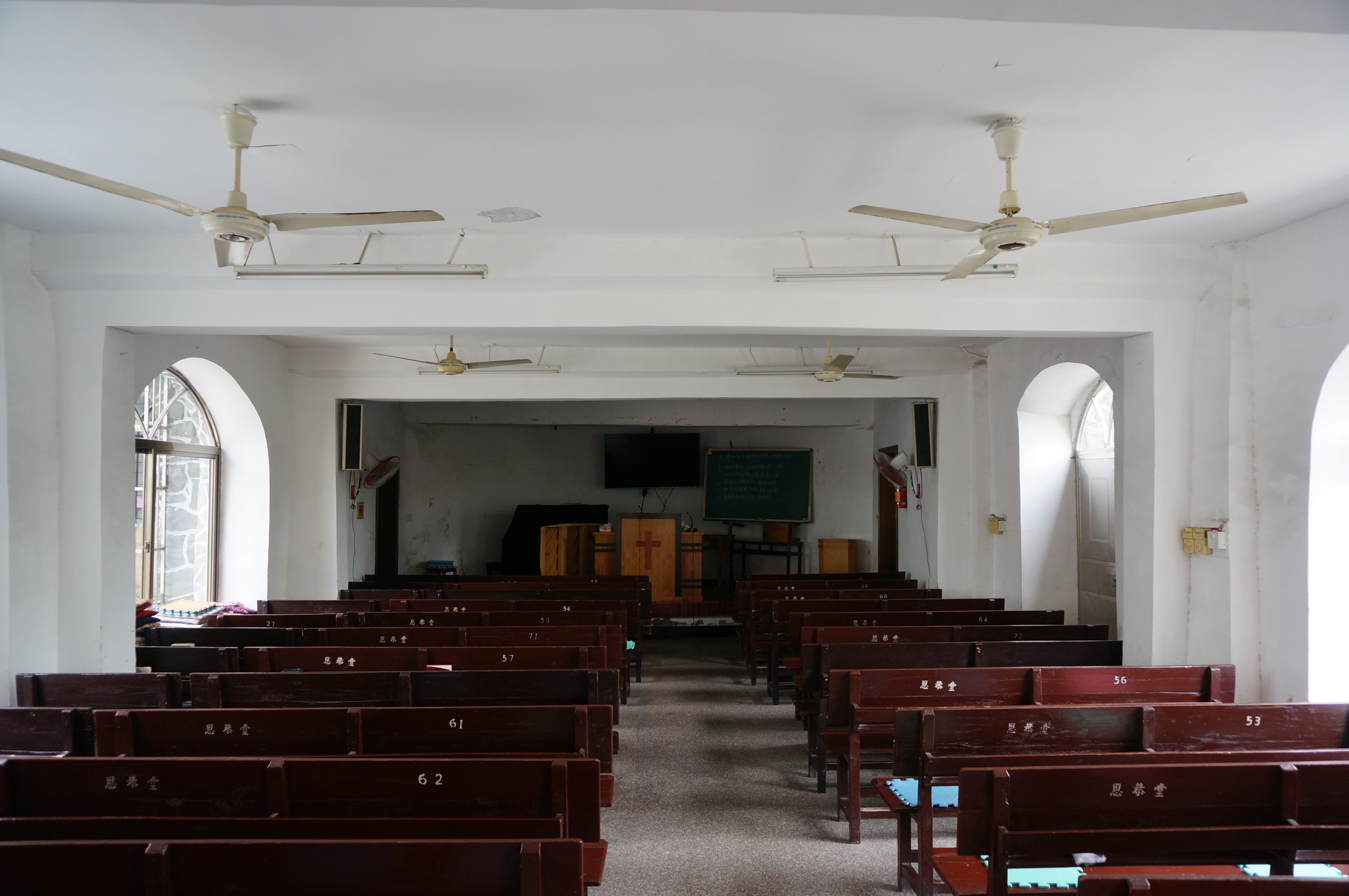
Interior of the church
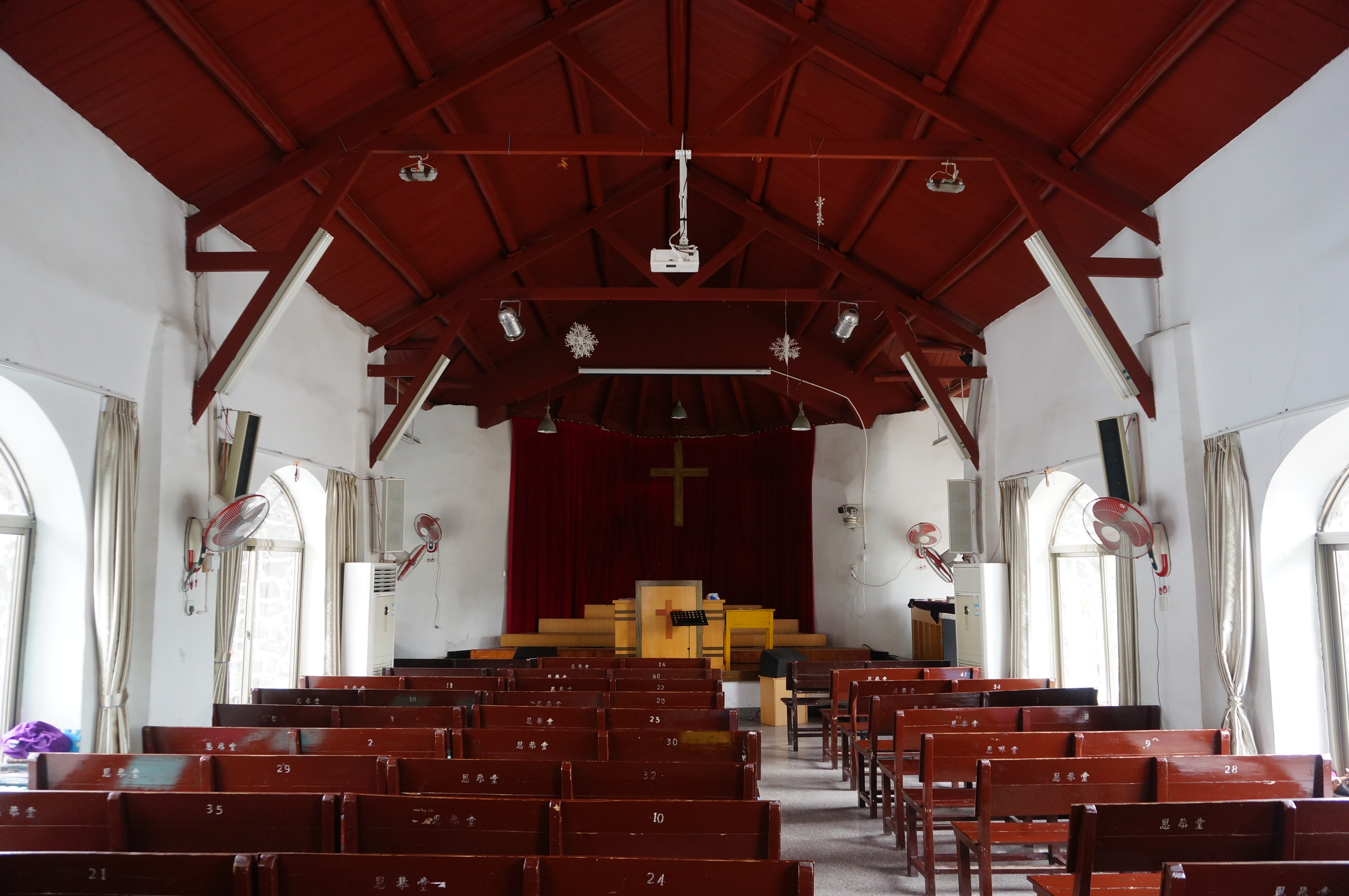
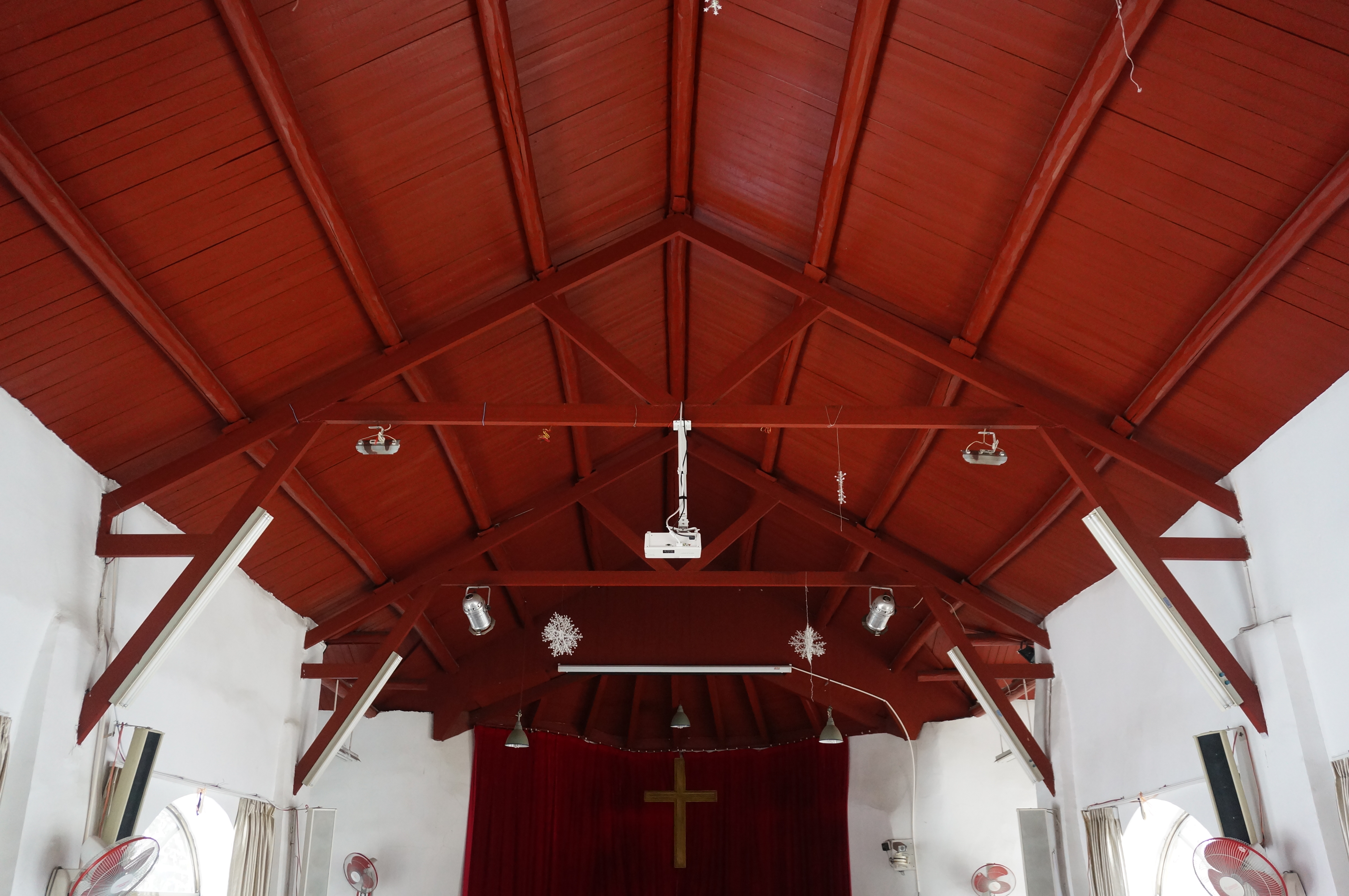
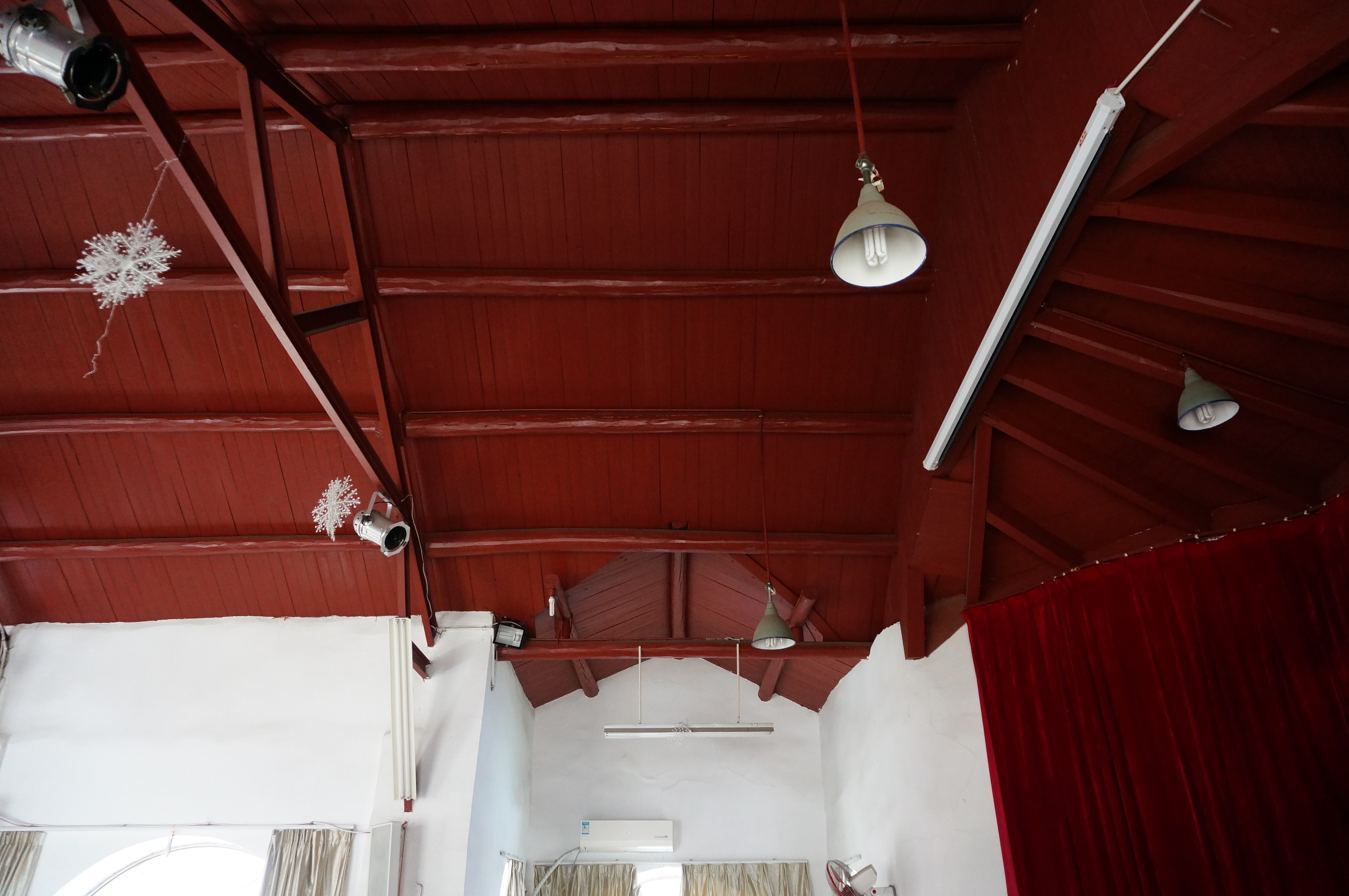
