= Daosheng Christ's Church =

- 道胜堂
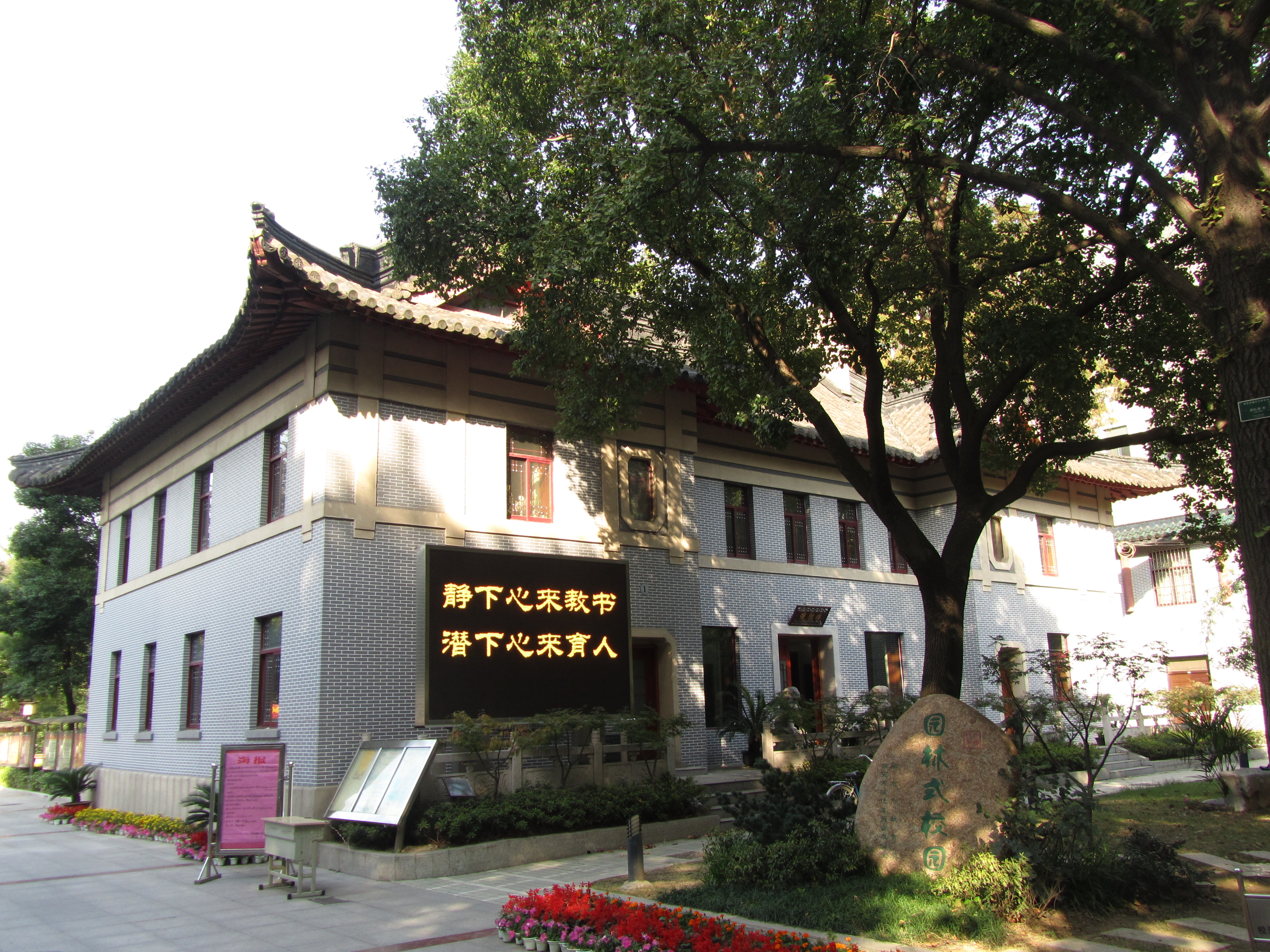
- Daosheng Christ's Church in 2011

- Location in Jiangsu
- 32°04′44″N 118°44′27″E
- Location: Gulou District, Nanjing, Jiangsu, China
- Denomination: Protestantism

History
- Status: Parish church
- Founded: 1915
- Founder: Protestant Episcopal Church Mission

Architecture
- Architectural type: Church building
- Style: Chinese architecture

Specifications
- Materials: Granite

Administration
- Diocese: Diocese of Kiangsu

Chinese name
- Simplified Chinese: 基督教道胜堂
- Traditional Chinese: 基督教道勝堂
Transcriptions
Standard Mandarin
- Hanyu Pinyin: Jīdūjiào Dàoshèng Táng

Daosheng Church
- Simplified Chinese: 道胜堂
- Traditional Chinese: 道勝堂
Transcriptions
Standard Mandarin
- Hanyu Pinyin: Dàoshèng Táng

Daosheng Christ's Church (Chinese: 基督教道胜堂), more commonly known as Daosheng Church (道胜堂), is a Protestant church located on North Zhongshan Road, in Gulou District, Nanjing, Jiangsu, China.

== History ==
The church was founded by the Protestant Episcopal Church Mission in 1915 with Chinese architecture style. The church was closed in 1958 and used as the Library of Nanjing No.12 High School. On 18 December 2008, the church held a foundation laying ceremony of its new building in Hekou Gate Park (河口闸公园). It was classified as a municipal cultural relic preservation organ by the Nanjing government in 1992 and a provincial cultural relic preservation organ by the Jiangsu government in 2019.
