= Christ's Church, Ürümqi =

- 乌鲁木齐市基督教会明德路堂
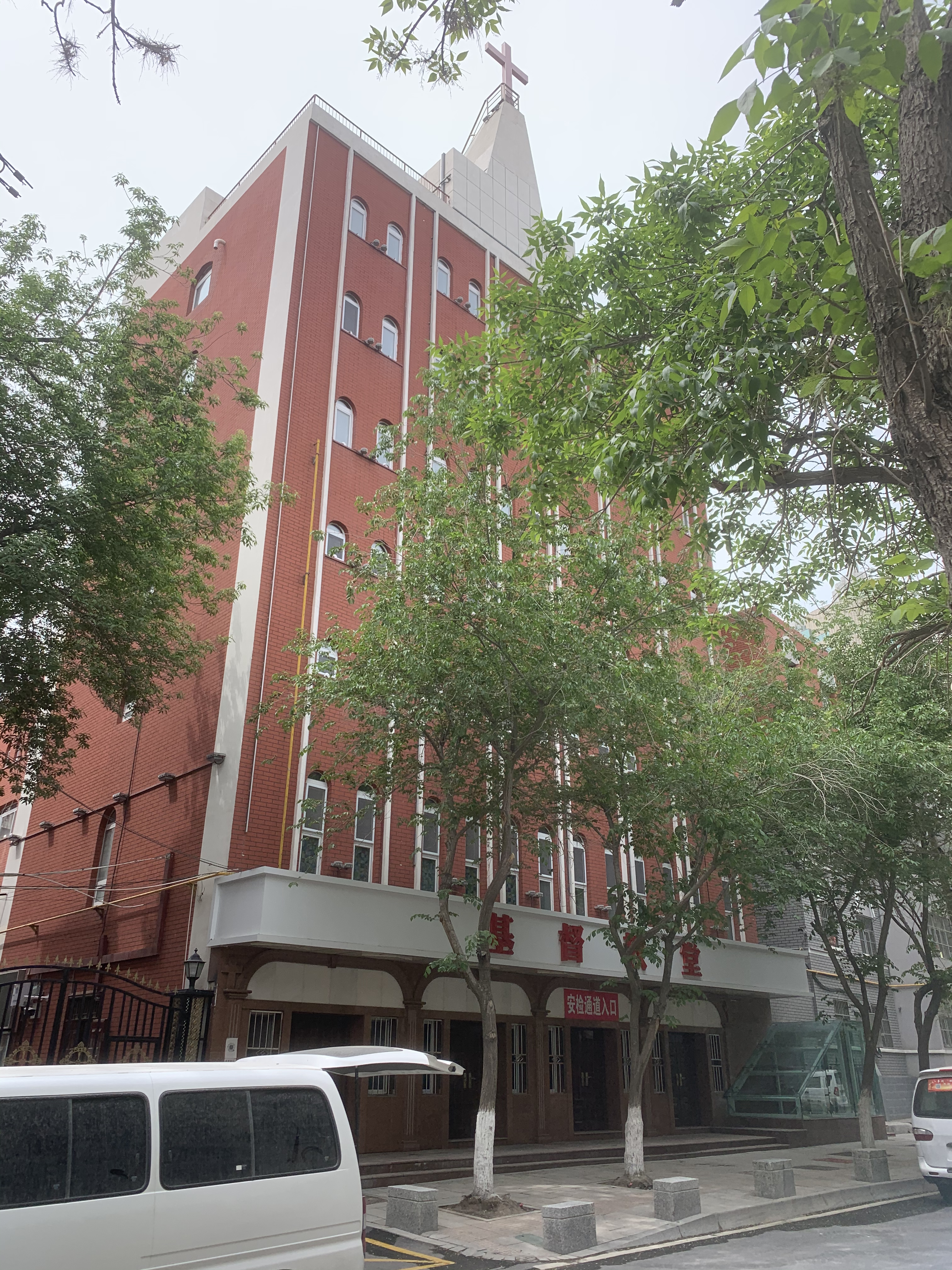
- Christ's Church, Ürümqi

- Location in Xinjiang
- 43°47′25.6″N 87°37′31.4″E
- Location: Tianshan District, Ürümqi, Xinjiang, China
- Denomination: Protestantism

History
- Status: Parish church
- Founded: 1945; 81 years ago
- Founder(s): Li Kaihuan, Zhai Mingxia

Architecture
- Functional status: Active
- Architectural type: Church building
- Years built: 1945
- Completed: 1995 (reconstruction)

Specifications
- Materials: Granite, bricks

Chinese name
- Simplified Chinese: 乌鲁木齐市基督教会明德路堂
- Traditional Chinese: 烏魯木齊市基督教會明德路堂
Transcriptions
Standard Mandarin
- Hanyu Pinyin: Wūlǔmùqíshì Jīdūjiàohuì Míngdélù Táng

Christ's Church, Ürümqi (Chinese: 乌鲁木齐市基督教会明德路堂) is a Protestant church located in Tianshan District of Ürümqi, Xinjiang, China.

== History ==
In February 1945, Li Kaihuan (李开焕), a member of the OMF International, and his wife Zhai Mingxia (翟明霞), a member of the Baptists, went to Xinjiang to preach. On August 26, Li held a general meeting of all believers and began preparations for the establishment of the church in Xinjiang. The Church Building Committee was built in March 1946 and began to raise funds for the construction of the church. Zhang Zhizhong, the then Governor of Xinjiang, also donated money.

Li died in 1959 and was buried in Dongshan Ecological Park. His wife continued religious activities. In 1966, the Cultural Revolution broke out, religious activities were forced to stop and the church was used as an electronic research station. After the 3rd Plenary Session of the 11th Central Committee of the Chinese Communist Party, a policy of some religious freedom was implemented. The church was returned to the church in 1985. A new church with a total area of 2,400 square metres (26,000 sq ft) was carried out in October 1994 and was completed before Christmas in 1995.
