= Christ's Church, Shangcheng District =

- 上城区基督教堂
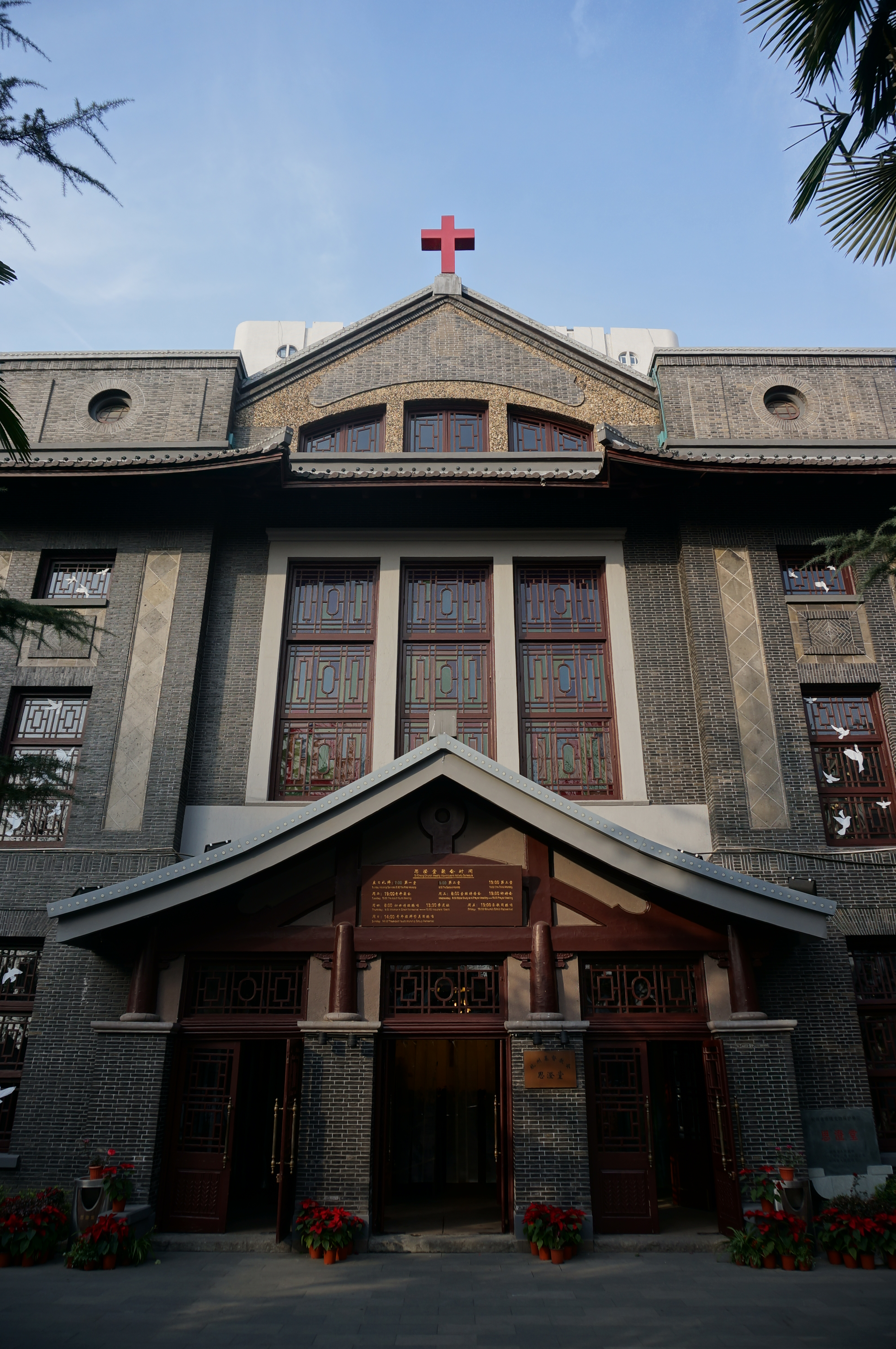
- Christ's Church, Shangcheng District in 2015

- Location in Zhejiang
- 30°15′24″N 120°10′46″E
- Location: Shangcheng District, Hangzhou, Zhejiang, China
- Denomination: Protestantism

History
- Status: Church
- Founded: 1864

Architecture
- Functional status: Active
- Architectural type: Church building
- Groundbreaking: 1924
- Completed: 1927 (reconstruction)

Specifications
- Materials: Granite, bricks

Chinese name
- Simplified Chinese: 上城区基督教堂
- Traditional Chinese: 上城區基督教堂
Transcriptions
Standard Mandarin
- Hanyu Pinyin: Shàngchéngqū Jīdūjiàotáng

Sicheng Christian Church
- Chinese: 思澄堂
Transcriptions
Standard Mandarin
- Hanyu Pinyin: Sīchéng Táng

Christ's Church, Shangcheng District (Chinese: 上城区基督教堂), locally known as Sicheng Christian Church (思澄堂), is a Protestant church located in Shangcheng District of Hangzhou, Zhejiang, China.

== History ==
In 1859, the Presbyterian Church in the United States of America sent John Livingstone Nevius from Ningbo to Hangzhou to preach. The church was originally built by the Presbyterian Church in the United States of America with the help of Zhang Chengzhai (张澄斋) in November 1864. Four years later, Zhang Chengzhai, a Chinese believer and co-founder of the church, was proposed as its first pastor. As the number of believers increased, the management decided to purchase land to prepare for the new church building. Zhang's son, Zhang Baoqing (张葆卿), donated 10,000 silver dollars and the church raised another 50,000 silver dollars. Reconstruction began in 1924 and were completed in 1927. It was put into use in 1930.

The church was closed during the ten-year Cultural Revolution and was occupied by the Hangzhou Library. On 30 August 1981, it was officially reopened to the public. At the end of 1983, Archbishop of Canterbury Robert Runcie came to visit. In December 2013, it was designated as a municipal cultural relic preservation organ by the Hangzhou government.

== Gallery ==
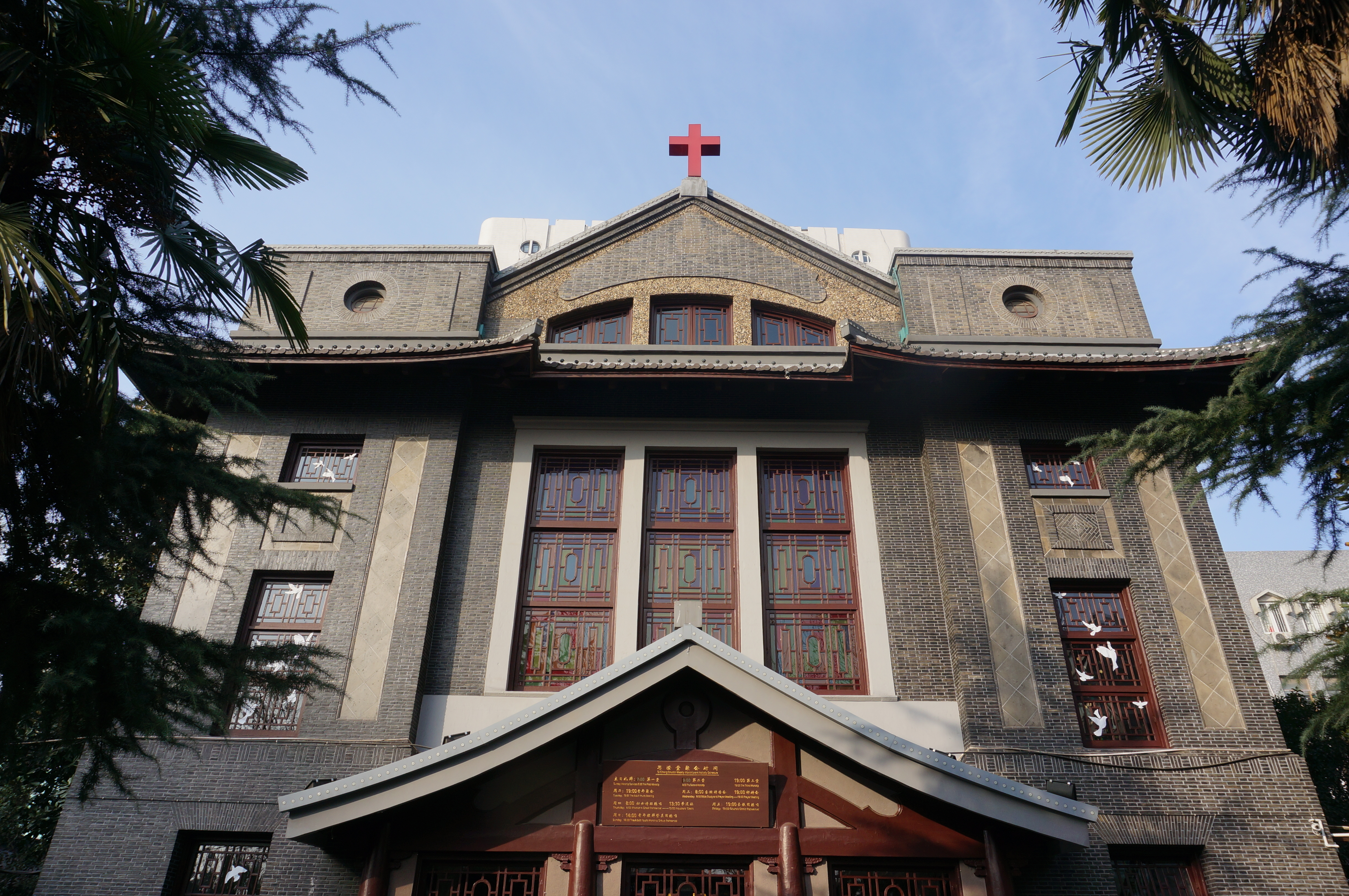
Christ's Church, Shangcheng District

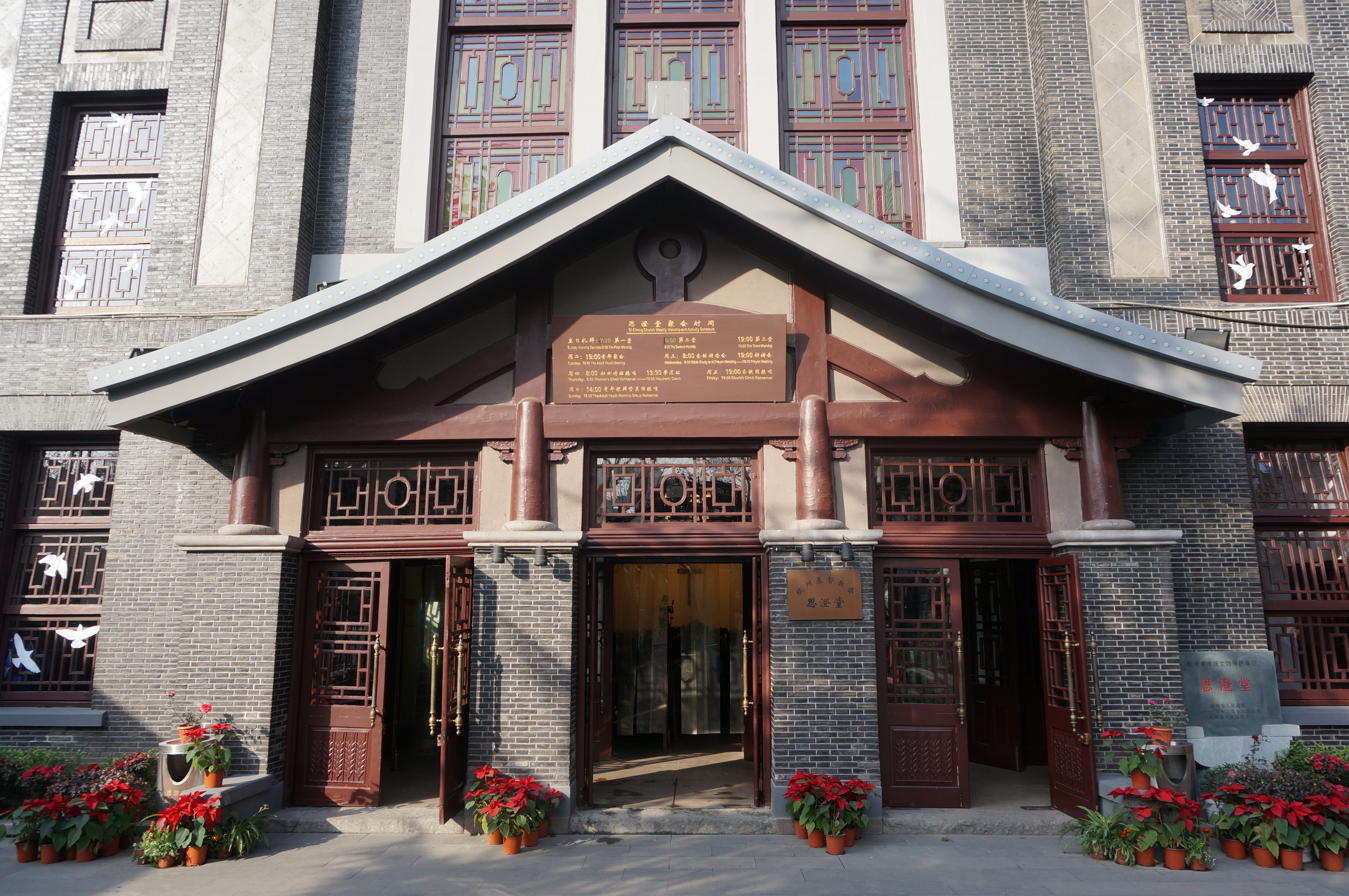
Entrance

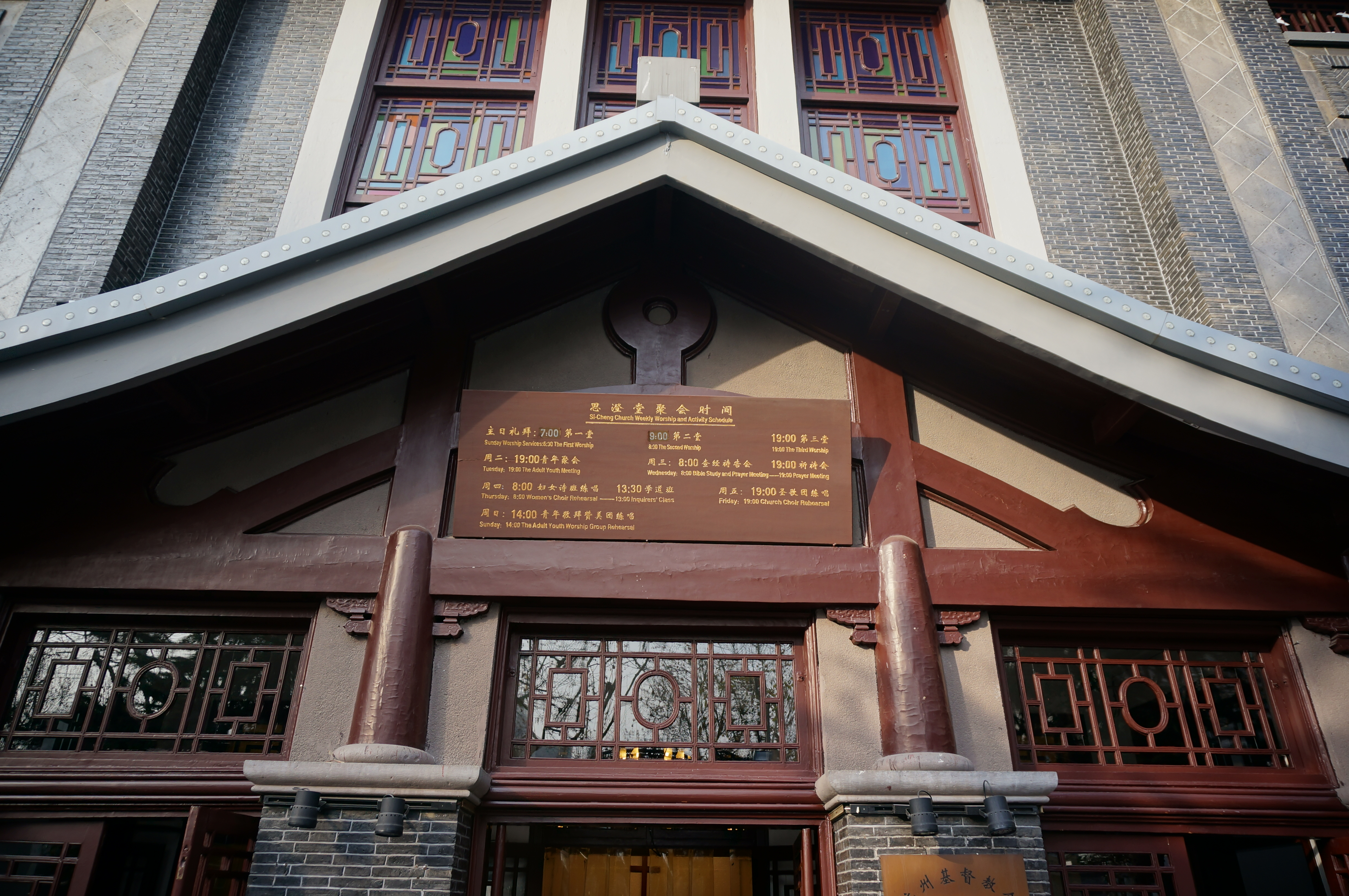
Entrance

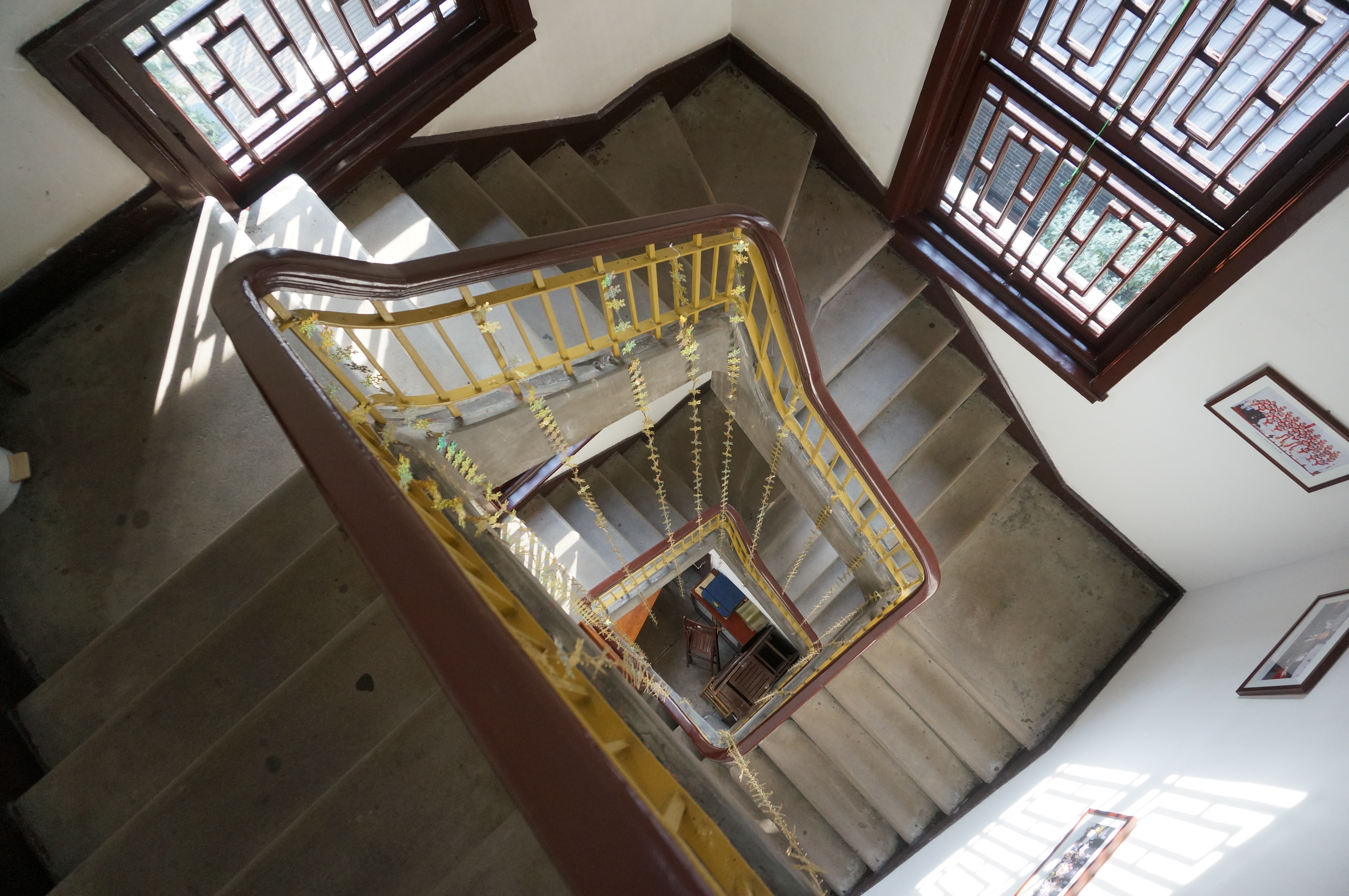
Staircase

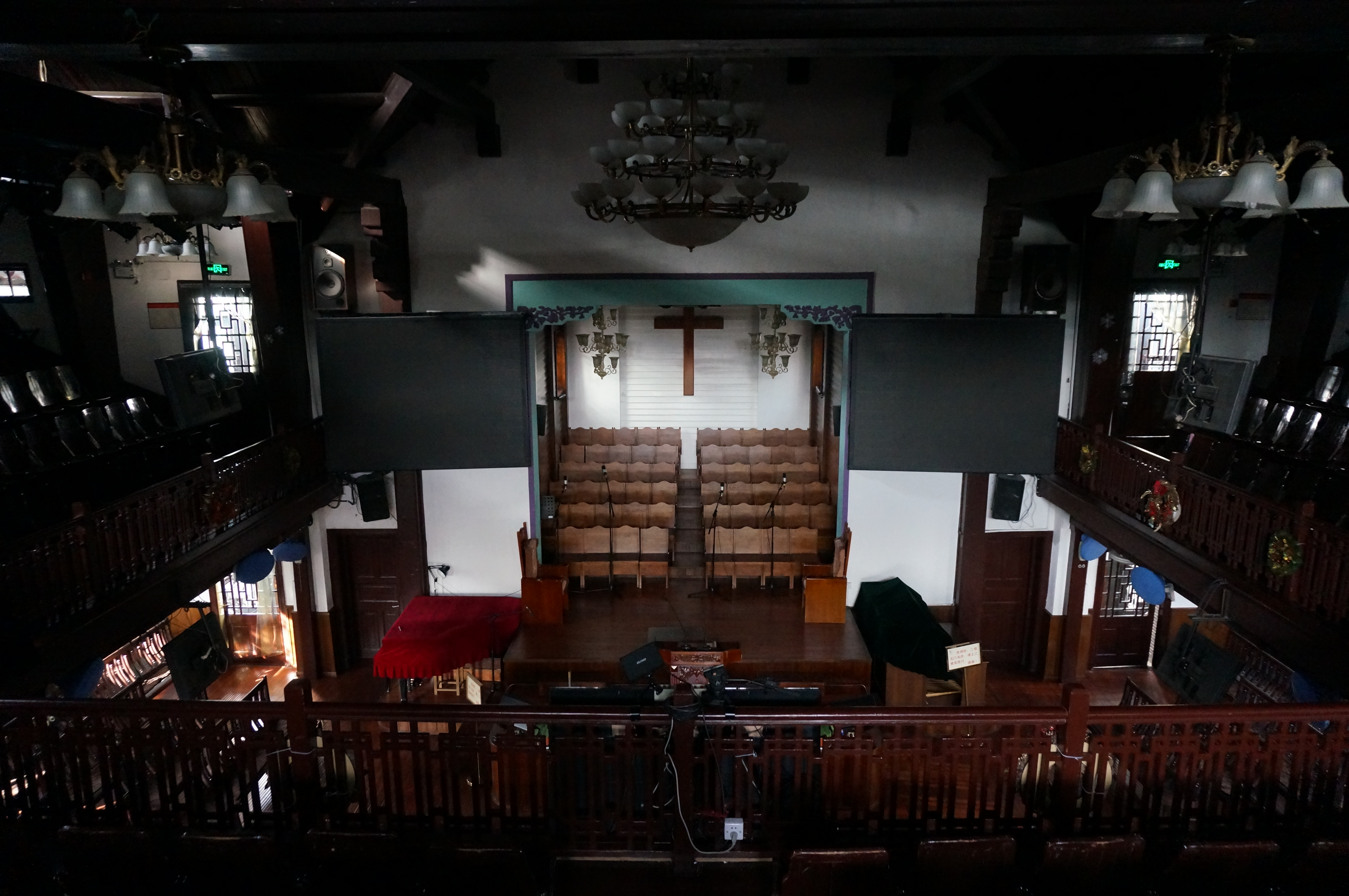
Interior

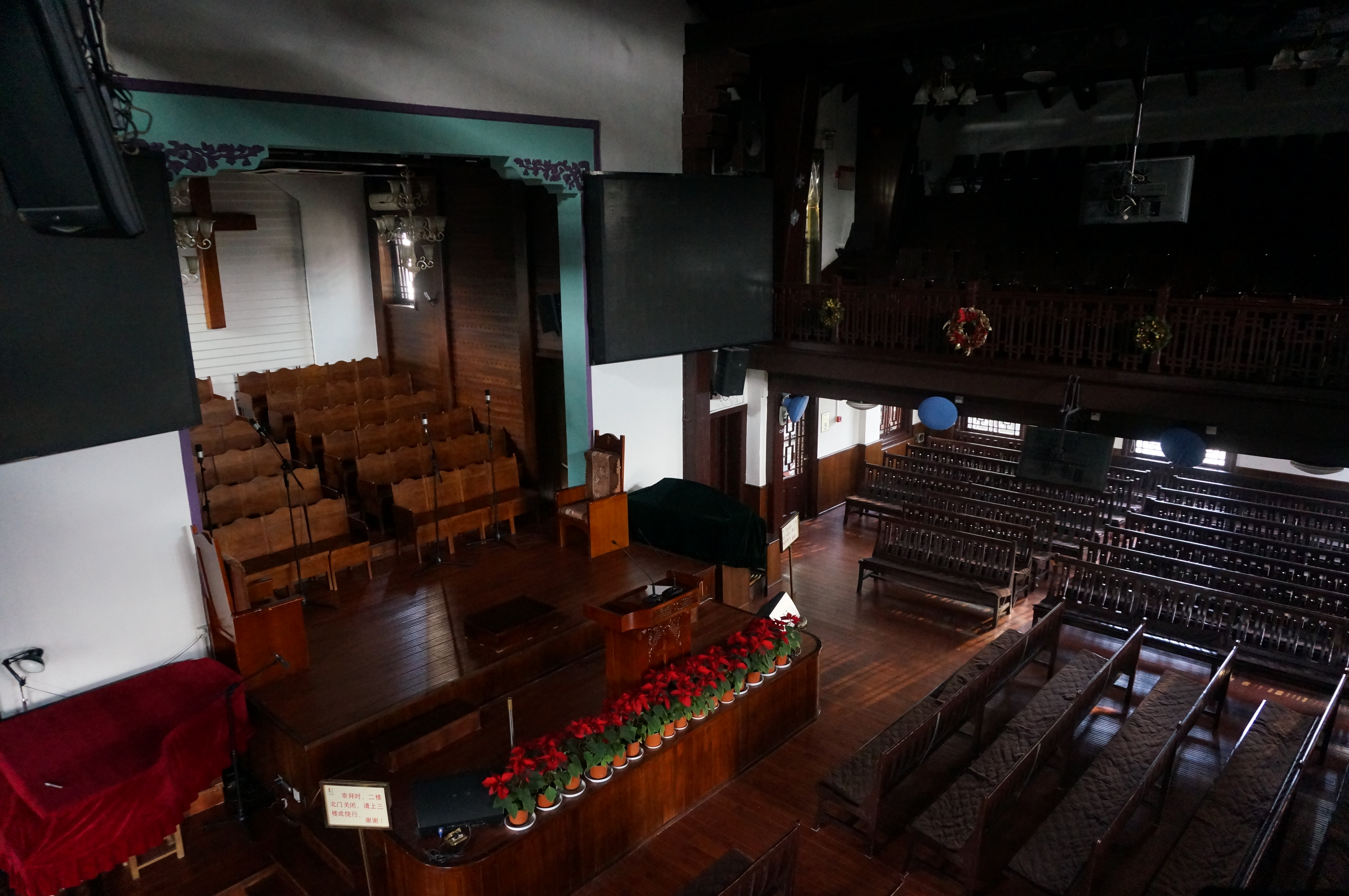
Interior

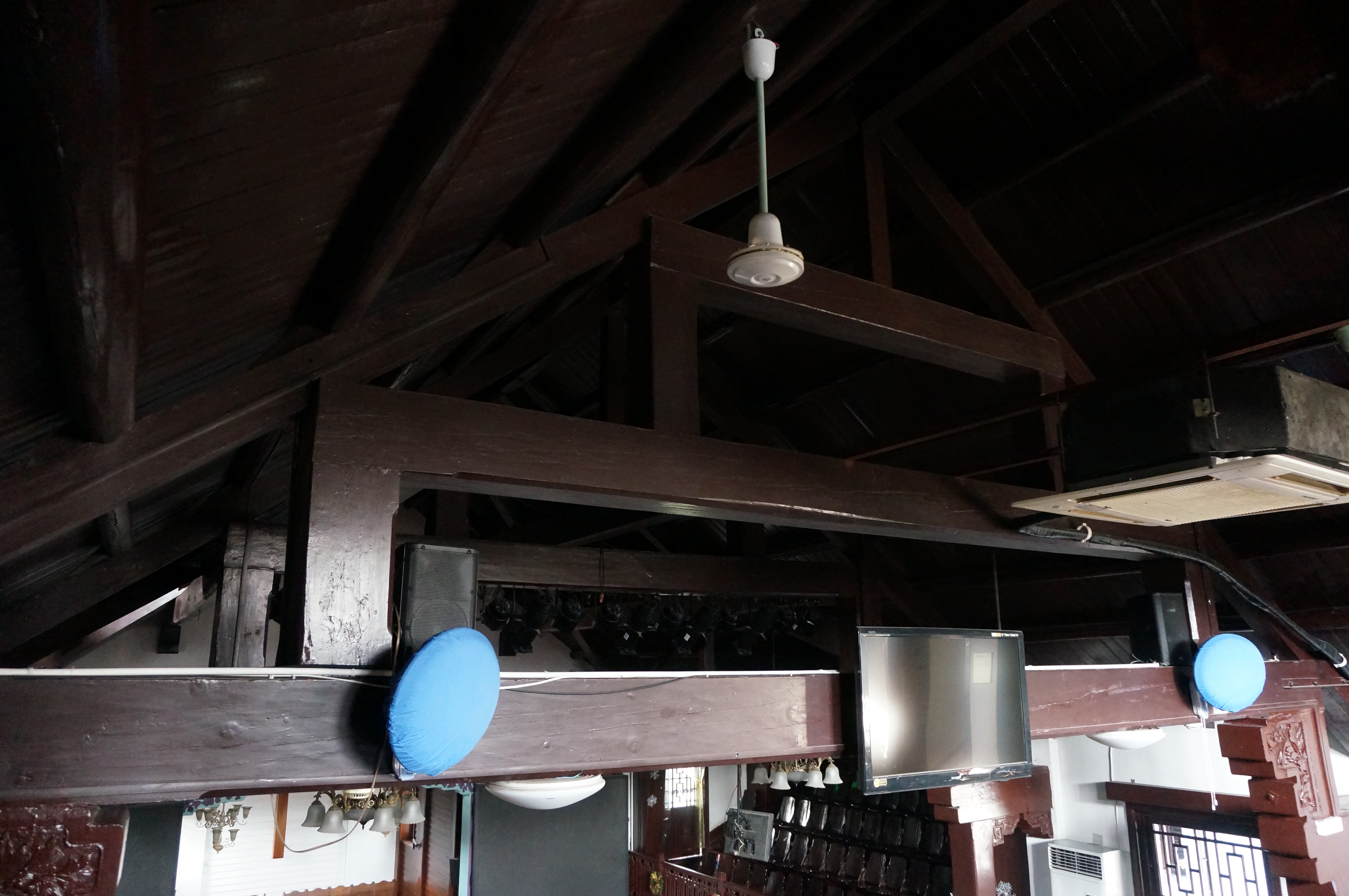
Beam frame

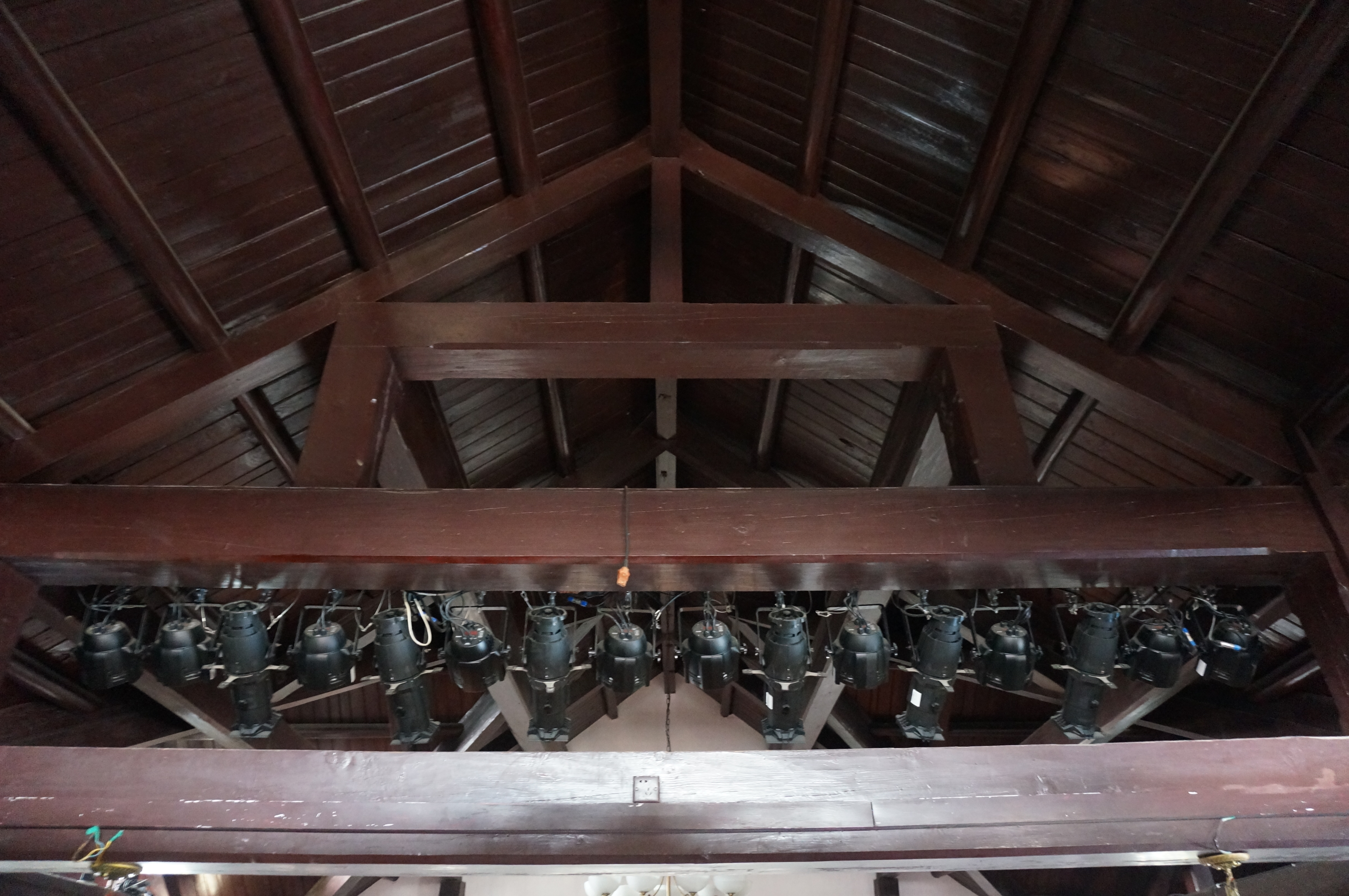
Beam frame

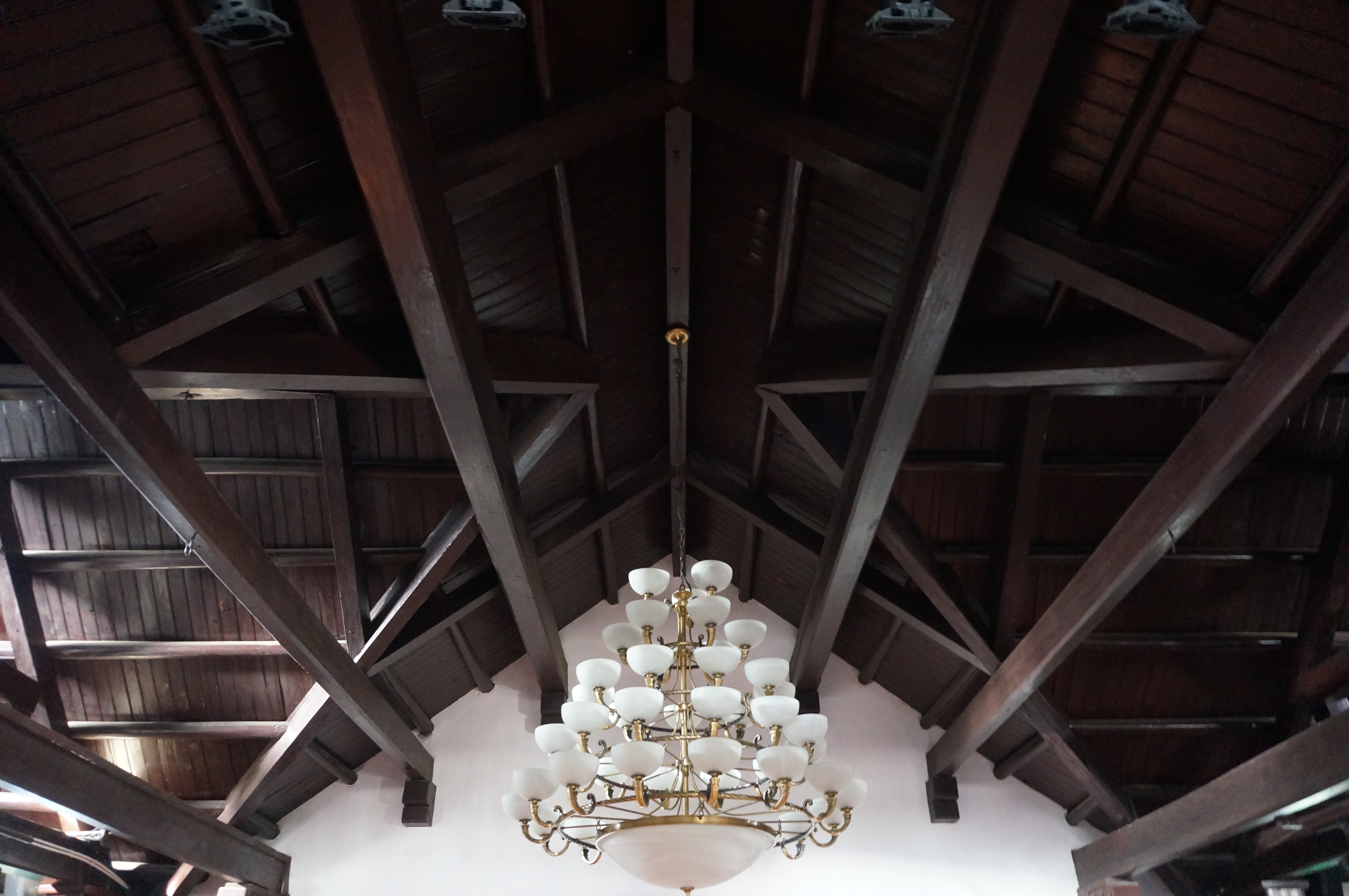
Beam frame
