= Christ's Church, Tangxi =

- 塘栖耶稣堂
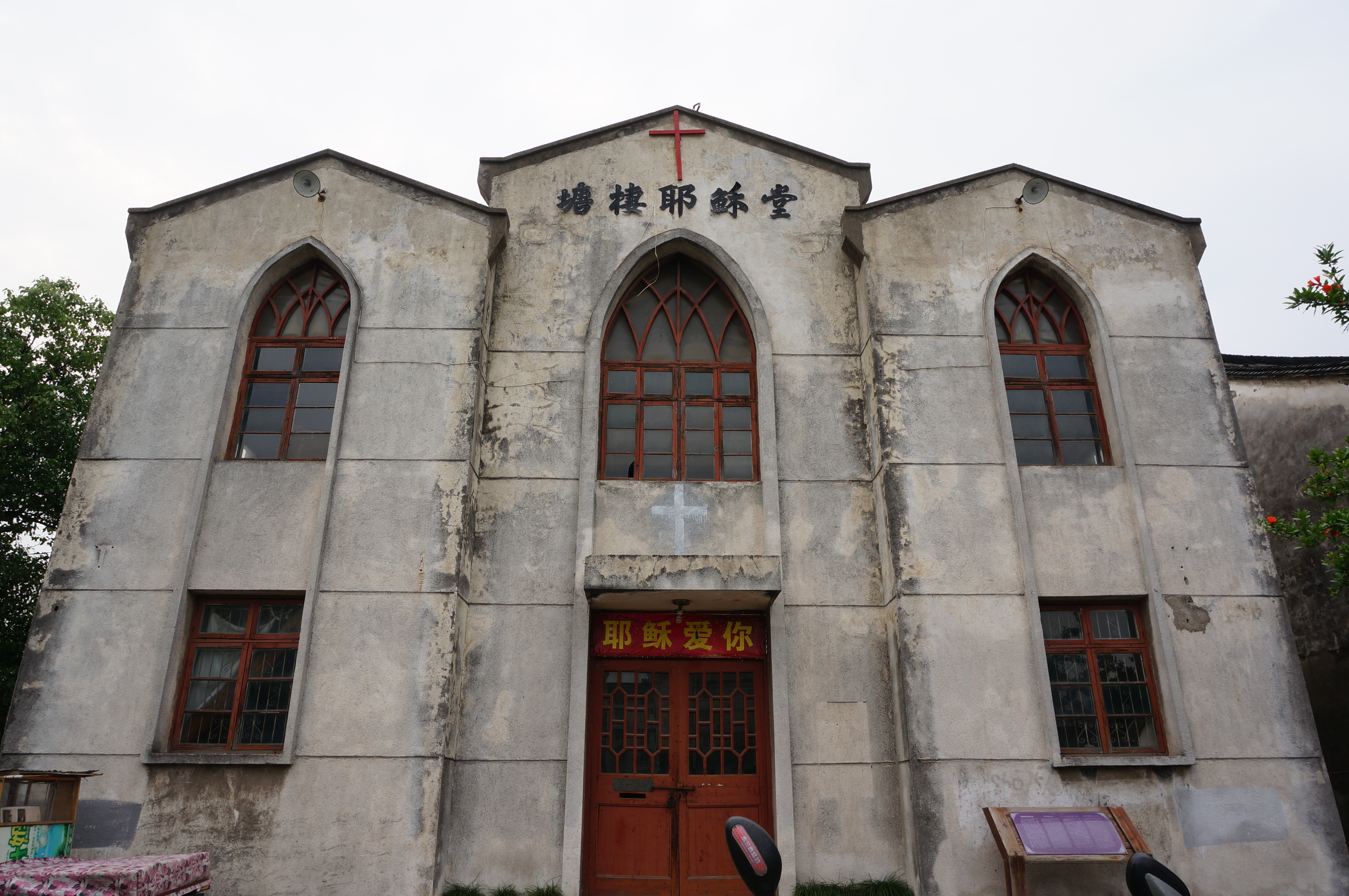
- Christ's Church, Tangxi in 2015

- Location in Zhejiang
- 30°28′39″N 120°12′34″E
- Location: Tangxi, Hangzhou, Zhejiang, China
- Denomination: Protestantism

History
- Status: Church
- Founded: 1899

Architecture
- Functional status: Active
- Architectural type: Church building

Specifications
- Materials: Granite, bricks

Chinese name
- Simplified Chinese: 塘栖耶稣堂
- Traditional Chinese: 塘棲耶穌堂
Transcriptions
Standard Mandarin
- Hanyu Pinyin: Tángxī Yēsūtáng

Christ's Church, Tangxi (Chinese: 塘栖耶稣堂) is a Protestant church located in Tangxi, Hangzhou, Zhejiang, China.

== History ==
The church was originally built in 1899 by Scottish missionary Jin Lede (金·乐德), and served as parish church of the Presbyterian Church in the United States of America in the region.
