= Christ's Church, Siming District =

Xinjie Christian Church
- 基督教新街堂
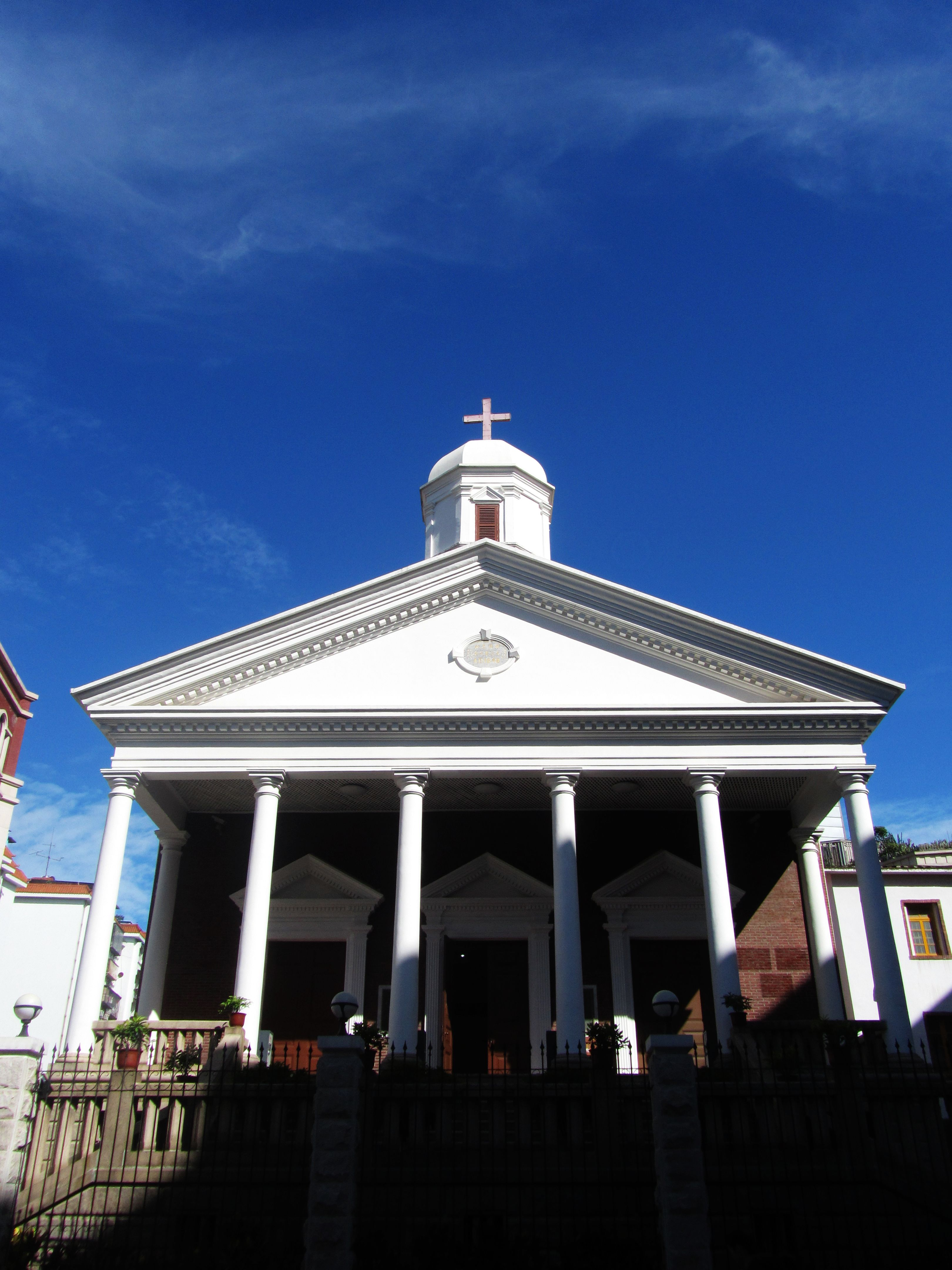
- Xinjie Christian Church in 2013

- Location in Fujian
- 24°27′35″N 118°05′20″E
- Location: Siming District, Xiamen, Fujian, China
- Denomination: Protestantism

History
- Status: Parish church
- Founded: 1847
- Founder: W. J. Pohlrnan

Architecture
- Functional status: Active
- Architectural type: Church building
- Style: Romanesque architecture
- Groundbreaking: 1933
- Completed: 1935 (reconstruction)
- Demolished: 1928

Specifications
- Materials: Granite, bricks

Chinese name
- Simplified Chinese: 基督教新街堂
- Traditional Chinese: 基督教新街堂
Transcriptions
Standard Mandarin
- Hanyu Pinyin: Jīdūjiào Xīnjīetáng

Xinjie Christian Church
- Chinese: 新街堂
Transcriptions
Standard Mandarin
- Hanyu Pinyin: Xīnjiētáng

Xinjie Christian Church (Chinese: 新街堂), is a Protestant church located in Siming District of Xiamen, Fujian, China.

== History ==
On 4 February 1842, the Reformed Church in America sent David Abeel to Xiamen, Fujian to preach. In December 1947, Uncle Fugui (福贵伯), a local believer, bought a piece of land in Taigou Tomb (now Taiguang Street) in downtown Xiamen for building church. In 1848, pastor W. J. Pohlrnan returned to the United States to raise $3,000 and built China's first Protestant church here. The dedication ceremony was held on 11 February 1849.

The church became dilapidated for neglect, and was demolished in 1928. A reconstruction of the entire church complex was carried out in 1933 and was completed in 1935, with Romanesque architecture style.

The church was closed in 1966 due to the Cultural Revolution, and was officially reopened to the public in 1979. It was designated as a municipal cultural relic preservation organ in 1982 and a provincial cultural relic preservation organ in 2005, respectively.

== Gallery ==
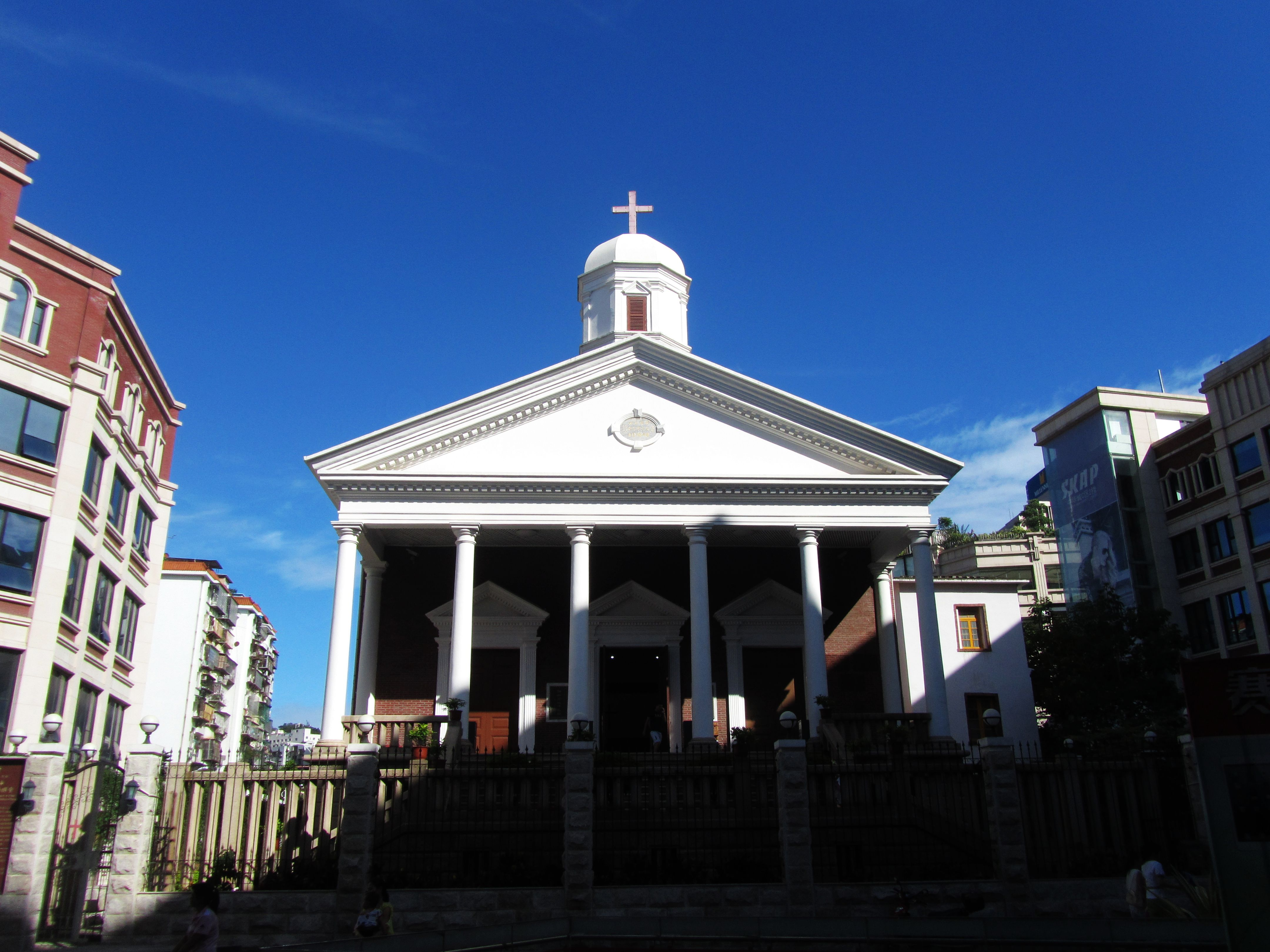
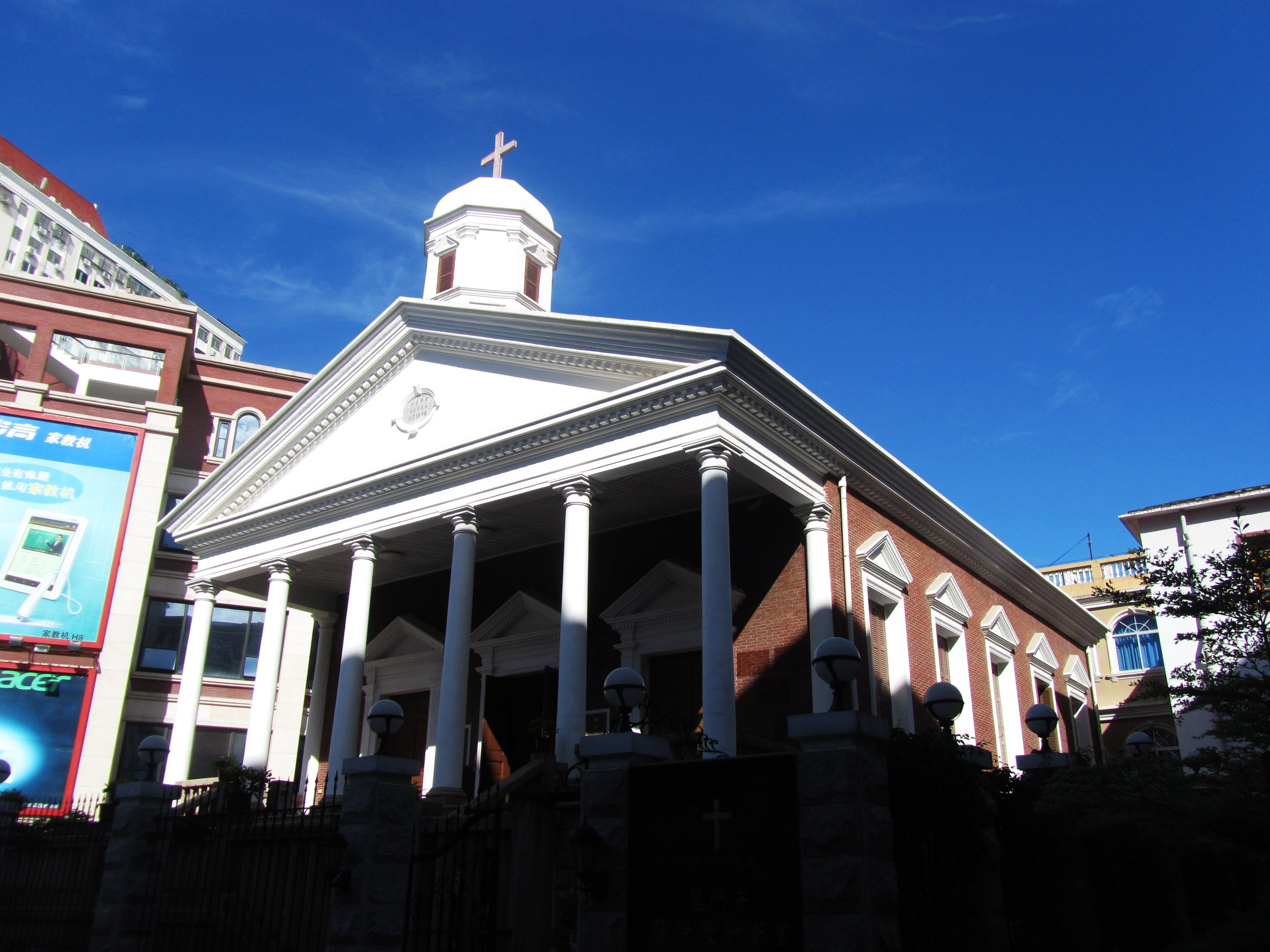
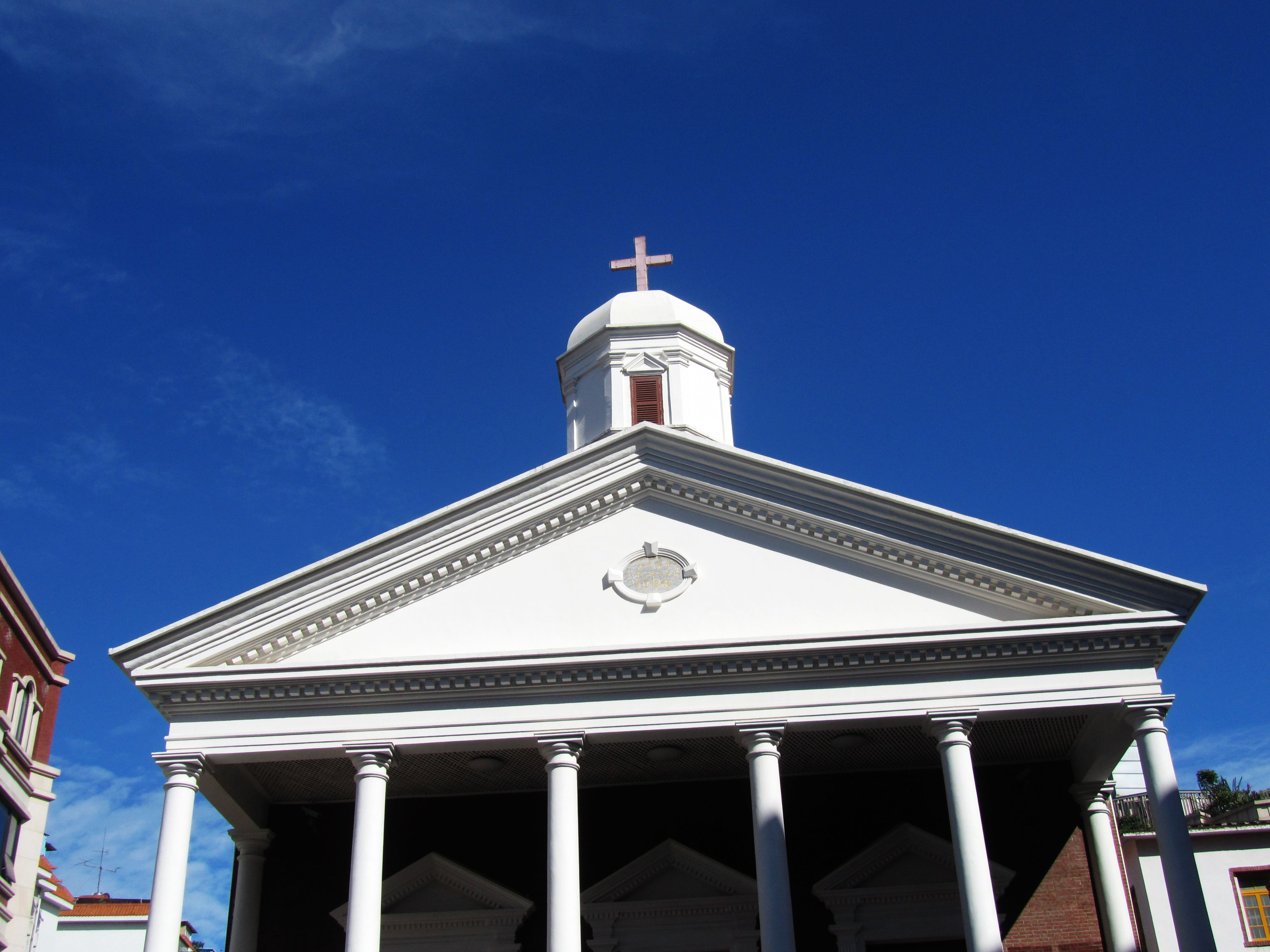
