= Christ's Church, Nanjing =

- 南京基督教堂
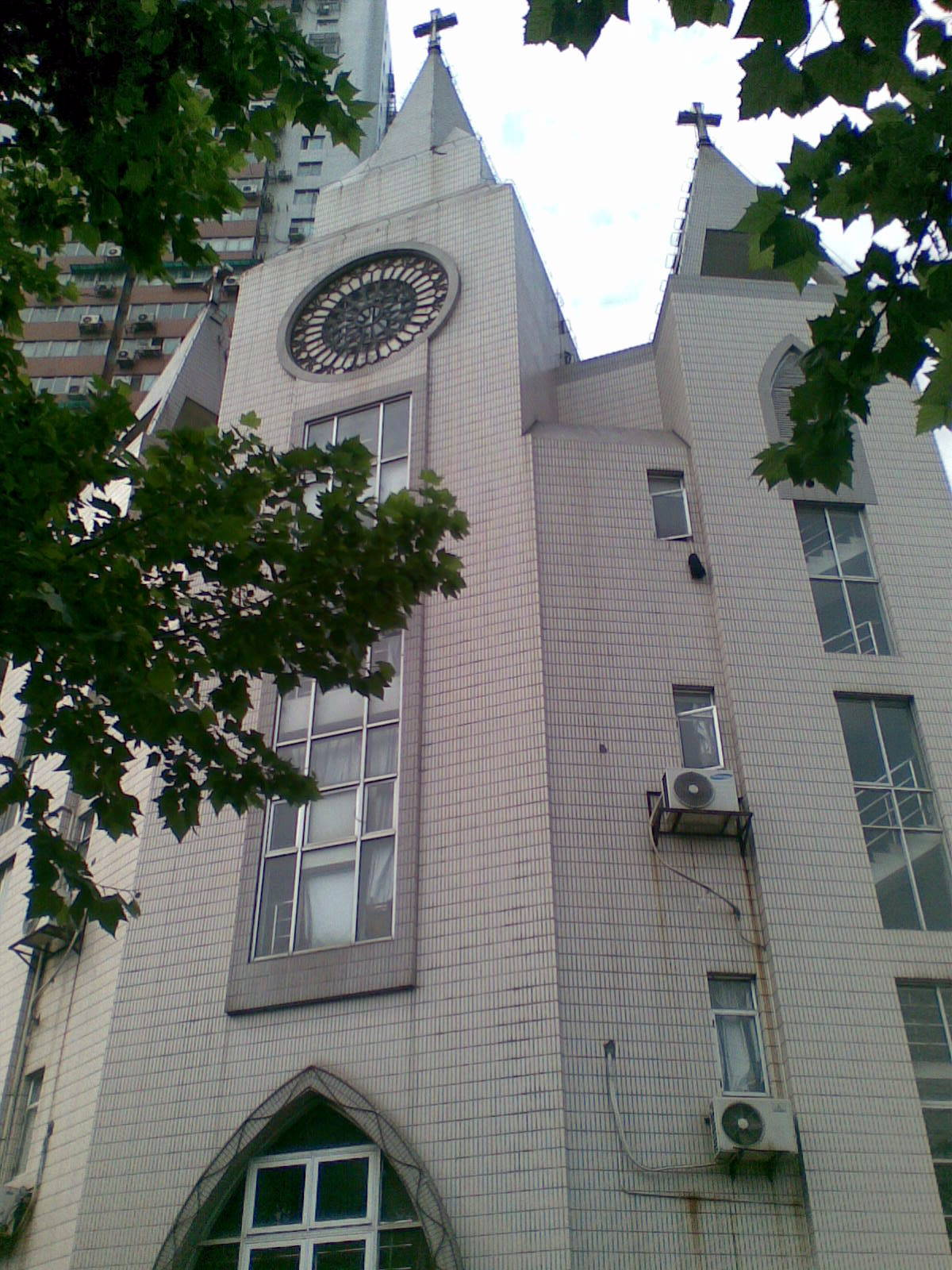
- Christ's Church, Nanjing in 2009

- Location in Jiangsu
- 32°04′13″N 118°46′38″E
- Location: Gulou District, Nanjing, Jiangsu, China
- Denomination: Protestantism

History
- Status: Parish church
- Founded: 1941
- Founder: Zhao Shuying

Architecture
- Functional status: Active
- Architectural type: Church building

Specifications
- Materials: Granite

Chinese name
- Chinese: 南京基督教堂
Transcriptions
Standard Mandarin
- Hanyu Pinyin: Nanjing Jīdū Jiàotáng

Christ's Church, Jiangsu Road
- Simplified Chinese: 江苏路基督教堂
- Traditional Chinese: 江蘇路基督教堂
Transcriptions
Standard Mandarin
- Hanyu Pinyin: Jiāngsūlù Jīdū Jiàotáng

The Christ's Church, Nanjing (Chinese: 南京基督教堂), locally known as Christ's Church, Jiangsu Road (江苏路基督教堂), is a Protestant church located on Jiangsu Road, in Gulou District, Nanjing, Jiangsu, China.

== History ==
The church traces its origins to the former "Lingguang Church" (灵光堂), founded by Zhao Shuying in 1941. In 1946, the Chinese Christian Spiritual Seminary, which was founded by Jia Yuming, moved back to Nanjing from Chongqing and rented it as the school location.

During the Cultural Revolution, the church was closed and reopened to the public in 1982. The church relocated to the current location in December 1999.
