= Christ's Church, Changzhou =

- 常州市基督教堂
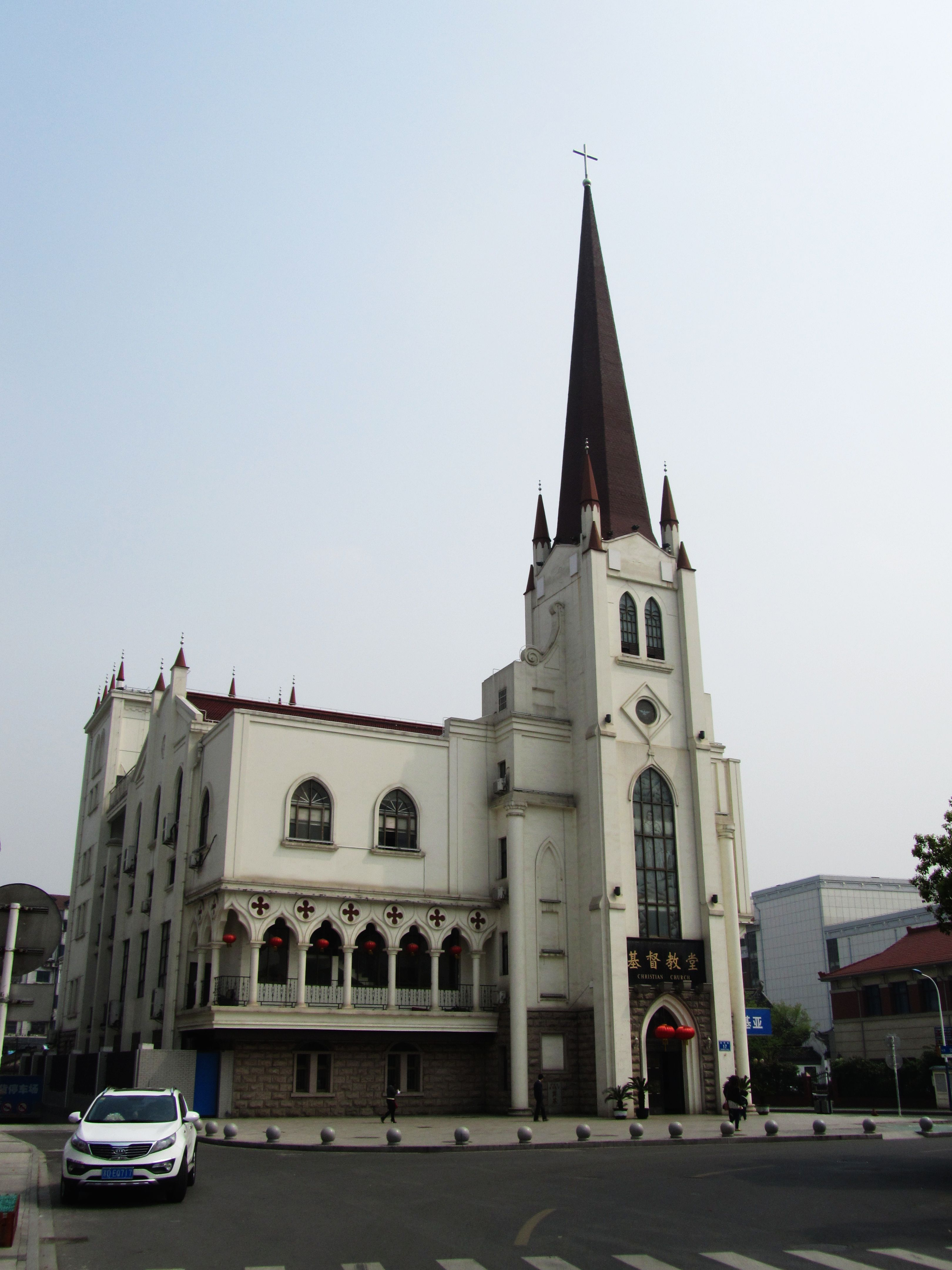
- Christ's Church, Changzhou in 2012

- Location in Jiangsu
- 31°46′45.16″N 119°57′30.45″E
- Location: Zhonglou District, Changzhou, Jiangsu, China
- Denomination: Protestantism

History
- Status: Parish church
- Founded: 1916
- Founder: John Hawk

Architecture
- Functional status: Active
- Architectural type: Church building
- Style: Gothic architecture
- Groundbreaking: July 2002
- Completed: March 2004

Specifications
- Materials: Granite, bricks

Chinese name
- Chinese: 常州市基督教堂
Transcriptions
Standard Mandarin
- Hanyu Pinyin: Chángzhōushì Jīdūjiàotáng

Kaile Church
- Simplified Chinese: 恺乐堂
- Traditional Chinese: 愷樂堂
Transcriptions
Standard Mandarin
- Hanyu Pinyin: Kǎilè Táng

Christ's Church, Changzhou (Chinese: 常州市基督教堂) is a Protestant church located in Zhonglou District, Changzhou, Jiangsu, China.

== History ==
In 1903, the Methodist Episcopal Church, South established the Christ's Church in Changzhou, Jiangsu. The church traces its origins to the former Kaile Church (恺乐堂), founded by the American missionary John Hawk (霍约翰) in 1916 in memory of his sister-in-law Carriger Hawk (霍恺乐; Huò Kǎilè).

The church was renamed Christ's Church in 1958. This name has been used to date. The church was closed during the ten-year Cultural Revolution. Renovations and a rebuilding of the main building began in July 2002 and were completed in March 2004 in a Gothic architectural style. A 48-metre (157 ft) high bell tower was added to the church. The new church has an area of 2,880 square metres (31,000 sq ft), which can accommodate up to 1,300 parishioners. The church was officially reopened to the public on 11 December 1983.

== Gallery ==
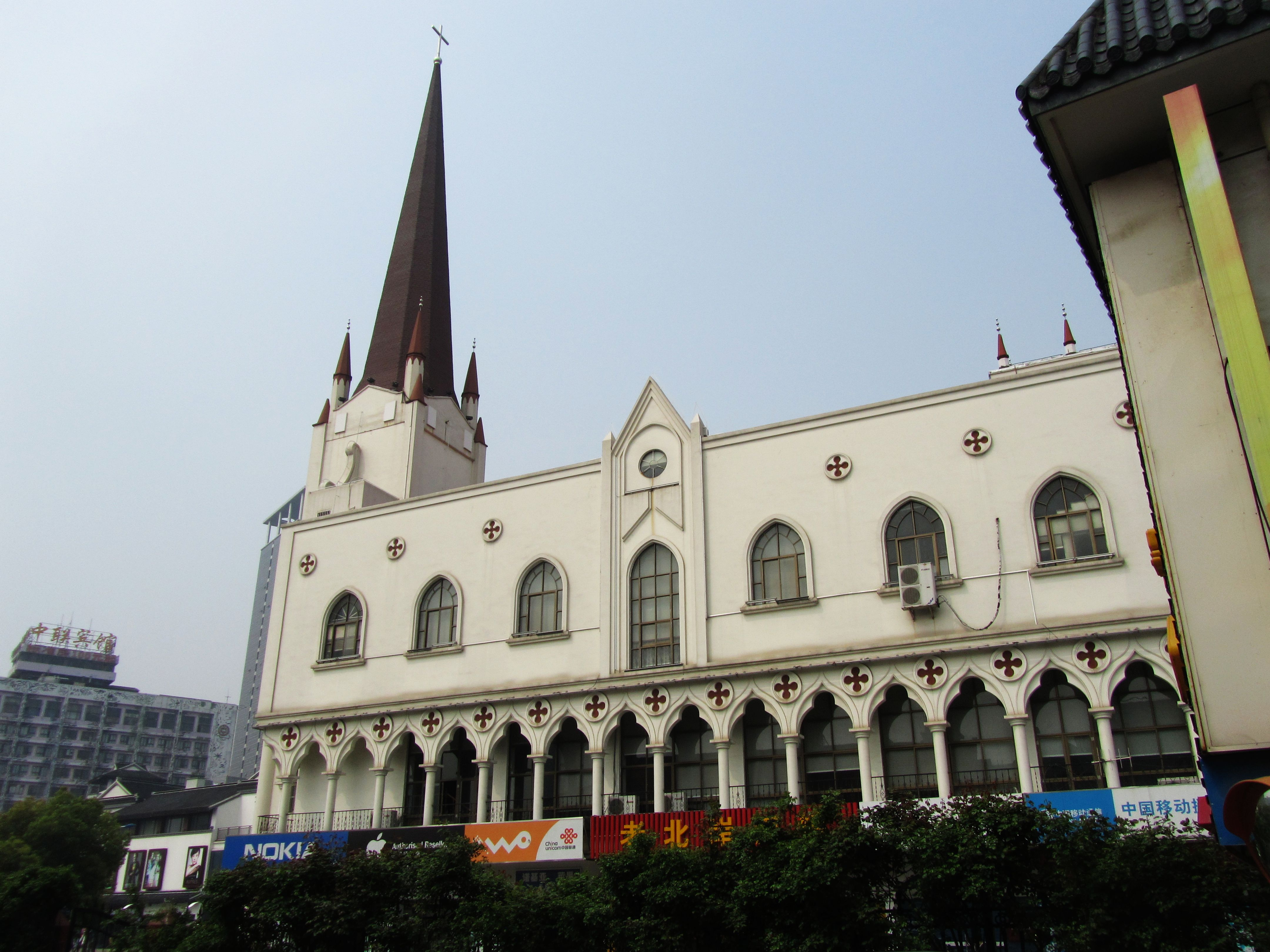
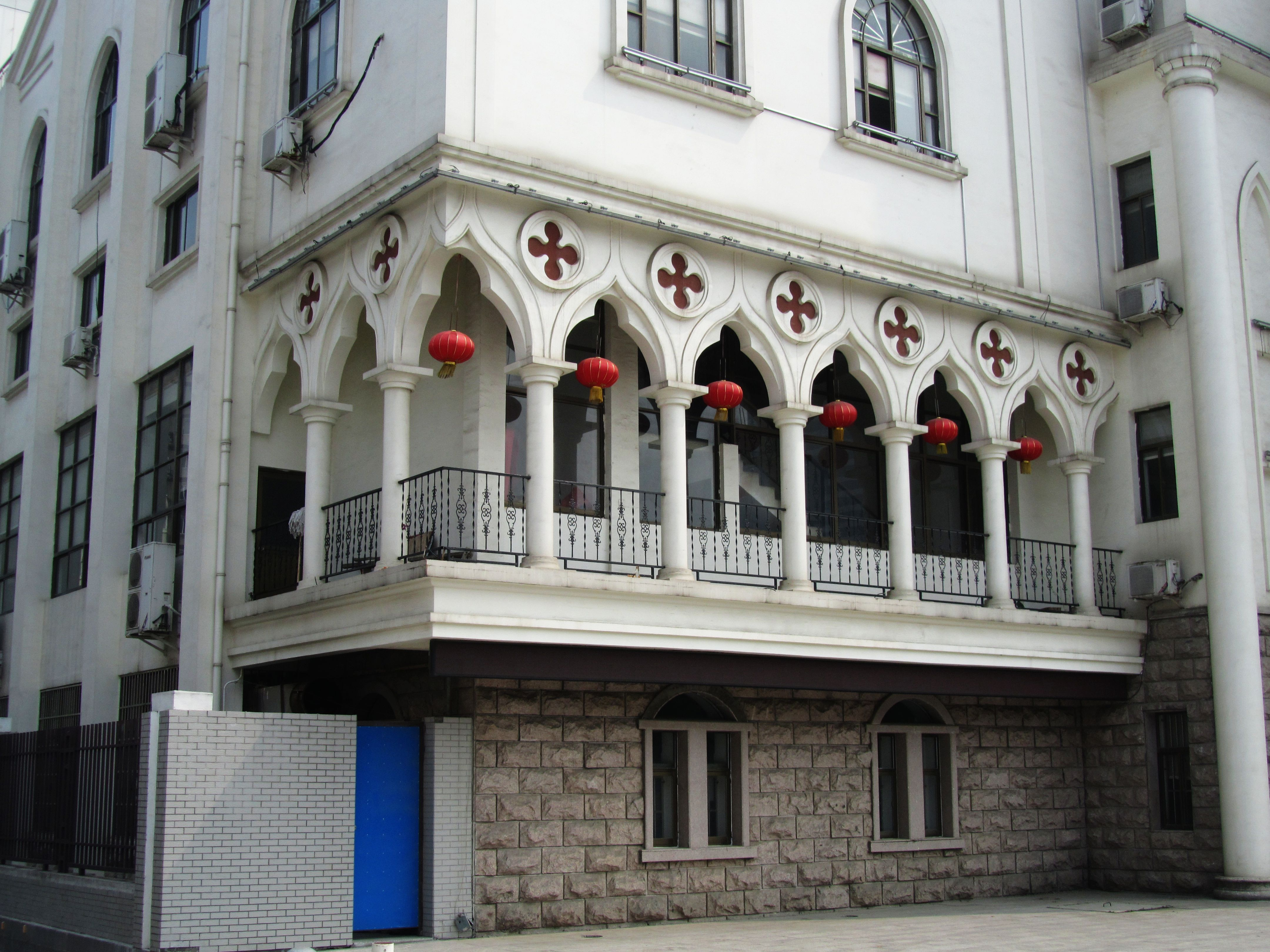
