= Christ's Church, Mochou Road =

- 莫愁路基督教堂
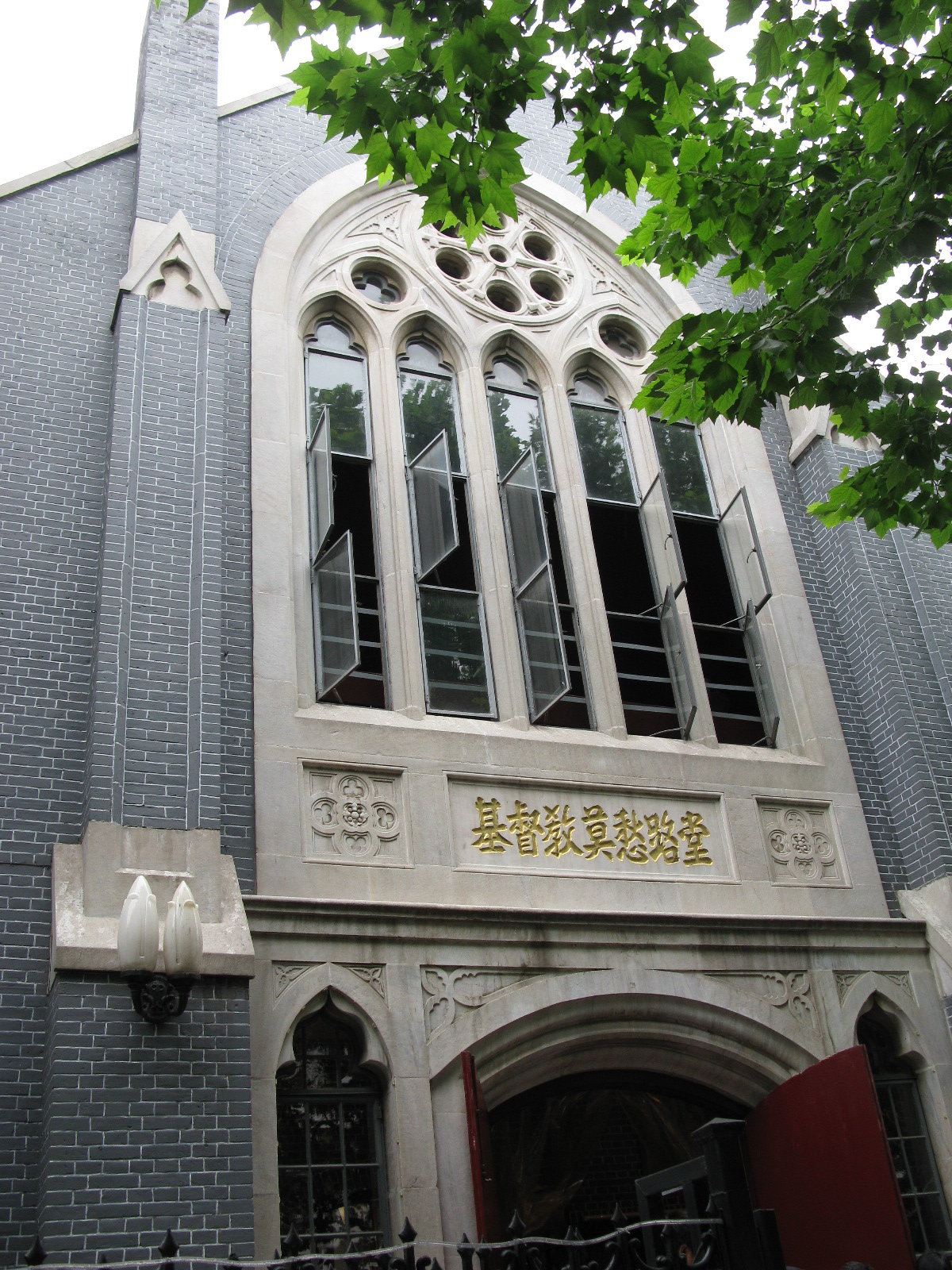
- Christ's Church, Mochou Road in 2011

- Location in Jiangsu
- 32°02′43″N 118°46′55″E
- Location: Qinhuai District, Nanjing, Jiangsu, China
- Denomination: Protestantism

History
- Status: Parish church
- Founded: 19th century
- Founder: Presbyterian Mission Agency

Architecture
- Functional status: Active
- Architectural type: Church building
- Groundbreaking: 1936
- Completed: 1942 (reconstruction)

Specifications
- Materials: Granite, bricks

Christ's Church, Mochou Road (Chinese: 基督教莫愁路堂; pinyin: Jīdūjiào Mòchóu Lù Táng) is a Protestant church located in Qinhuai District, Nanjing, Jiangsu, China.

== History ==
The church traces its origins to the former Oratory (礼拜堂), founded by the Presbyterian Mission Agency in the 19th century. And the Church of Christ in China established the Hanzhong Church (汉中堂) in 1927. Renovations and rebuilding to the main building began in 1936 and were completed in 1942.

The church was closed during the ten-year Cultural Revolution. It was officially reopened to the public in 1981. The church was classified as a municipal cultural relic preservation organ in 1992 and a provincial cultural relic preservation organ in 2002, respectively.
