= Shandong Chinese Independent Christian Church =

Chinese Christian church

The Shandong Chinese Independent Christian Church (Chinese: 山东中华基督教自立会) is an independent Chinese Christian church founded in Shandong by Liu Shoushan (劉壽山) in 1915. Their main method of evangelizing was through the provision of medical support and education to people. These were some of the earliest indigenous churches established by local Chinese Christians.
