= Christ's Church, Jacksonville =

Christ's Church
- Christ's Church
- Location: Jacksonville, Florida
- Country: United States
- Denomination: non-denominational
- Website: www.christs.church

History
- Founded: 1974

Christ's Church is a non-denominational Christian megachurch located in southern Jacksonville, Florida. According to the church's website, attendance is over 1,500 at worship services in their four locations. According to the Christian Standard, Christ's Church is "one of the finest church facilities in the country".

== History ==
Mandarin Christian Church (MCC) was founded in 1974 when Mandarin was still rural; Interstate 295 and the Buckman Bridge had recently been completed and St. Augustine Road had two traffic lanes. The family of Loraine Oden donated 3 acres (12,000 m^{2}) of land for the first church building which contained a sanctuary with seating for 160, a handful of classrooms, bathrooms, and offices for Pastor Gene Helmey and the church secretary. Forty members attended the dedication of the sanctuary on October 20, 1974, but membership grew rapidly, necessitating construction of a fellowship hall and more classrooms in 1976.

=== Lead pastor ===
Pastor Dennis Bratton began his ministry in the summer of 1978. According to Bratton, every activity of the church helps fulfill Jesus' Great Commission to "preach to the world and to provide for the less fortunate". As of June 2010, Dr. Dennis Bratton has retired from Christ's Church with the title "Pastor Emeritus" and begun his own project to go "beyond relief" in helping those in extreme poverty in different places around the world through the Kore Foundation. Lead Pastor, Jason Cullum, has stepped up to the Senior Pastor position.

As the church grew, it expanded in membership, requiring more space and more staff. In 1982, the church constructed a Family Life Center. Church members themselves volunteered their time and expertise to lower expenses of construction, finishing the interior of the professionally assembled shell. In 1987, the church increased its services for families with young children in the area, opening the Sharing Tree Preschool. It also extended its offerings for teenagers with a teen program eventually settled in a separate property called "The Ranch". Along with new staff to address the needs of youth and children, staff was added to assist with seniors, pastoral care and outreach, as well as to address needs in the church like music.

Growth continued to exceed space. A 1,000-seat worship center built in 1986 had to be expanded in 1991. Nevertheless, and even with the addition of multiple services including the popular "Saturday Night Alive" service on Saturday evening, the church realized in 1994 that it needed more space. At the same time, it decided to open a Christian school.

== Christ's Church Academy ==
On August 29, 1995, Mandarin Christian School began providing a Christian education to students in kindergarten through fifth grades. Sixth, seventh and eighth grades were added in 1996, 1997 and 1998, respectively. After the church moved to their new home on Greenland Road, the school began to utilize all the space in the building for the 1999–2000 school year. Ninth and tenth grades were included in 2005, eleventh grade in 2006 and twelfth grade in 2007. Their first high school graduation was held in May, 2008 and the fully accredited school is "one of the (Jacksonville) area's largest private, Bible-based educational entities". The school has an enrollment of 537, with 114 students in grades 9–12, but began fielding varsity sports teams in 2007. In the 2008–09 school year, they began competing as a member of Florida High School Athletic Association class 1A.

In 2010, the Florida High School Athletic Association levied harsh sanctions against Mandarin Christian School and fined the school $142,500 (the second-largest the association has ever handed down) for 25 violations committed in their football program. Because of these violations the football team was unable to participate in state series contests for five years, after which they were placed on administrative probation for three years, concluding on June 1, 2018.

In the summer of 2011, the decision was made to change the school's name to more closely associate it with the church, and Mandarin Christian School became Christ's Church Academy.

Christ's Church Academy has a 100% college acceptance rate for graduating seniors. It is a college preparatory school that boasts excellent academics, competitive athletics and a fully integrated arts program.

== A New Home ==
The search for a new church location identified a 37 acres (150,000 m^{2}) parcel on Greenland Road. Notable local firm KBJ Architects was selected to design the new facility. Ground was broken on January 25, 1998, and the members received frequent progress reports. After the last service concluded at their old facility on June 6, 1999, the church members made a symbolic walk to their new church building, 4½ miles away. The new church complex was designed to accommodate growth in the church, which was located adjacent to major highways. Interstate 295 borders the property on the north, while Interstate 95 is 1/10 mile to the west.

Phase I included a 115,000 sq ft (10,700 m^{2}) Sanctuary with seating for 2,500 that expanded to 3,500. It also contained office spaces, conferences rooms, classrooms and nurseries, among other rooms. A 1,600-seat auditorium is located nearby. The entrance to the Sanctuary is an enormous atrium where hundreds of members and guests can meet, talk and enjoy refreshments before and after services.

The original plans included a future Phase II 80,000 sq ft (7,400 m^{2}) Community Center, which would contain a chapel, preschool, dining hall, gymnasium, offices and student center. The future became reality when construction began in 2002. Phase II was completed in February, 2003.

In 2005, MCC hosted the Southeast Regional Conference of the North American Christian Coalition (NACC).

== A New Name ==
In 2005, the church began an outreach through satellite campuses. Mandarin Christian Church had been in their new facility for six years, and because the church was no longer “in” Mandarin, a name was needed that was conducive to other locations. It was decided to drop “Mandarin”, and the name officially became Christ's Church on January 9, 2005. Their mission was to “Make Disciples, More Disciples, Better Disciples”.

== Beliefs ==
Christ's Church is an independent, non-denominational Christian church, but tends to adhere to doctrine that is similarly espoused by other named Christian Churches stemming from the Restoration Movement. Two prominent features of these beliefs include a practice of the receiving of Communion during each service, and an encouragement to believers to submit to water baptism by immersion. There is no denominational creed. Instead, the church adheres to a philosophy advocated by Augustine of Hippo: "In essentials, unity....In non-essentials, liberty.....In all things, love."

== Satellite Campuses ==
The church had 4,000 members in 2004, but one quarter of those did not reside in Jacksonville. A membership study found that a majority of the 1,000 lived in Clay County, so in December, 2004 the church began holding a service at St. Johns Country Day School. Initial attendance was 200, which doubled when a second service was added. Christ's Church Fleming Island (CCFI), south of Orange Park, was announced on March 20, 2005. The church leaders began to search for a permanent church location on the west side of the St. Johns River.

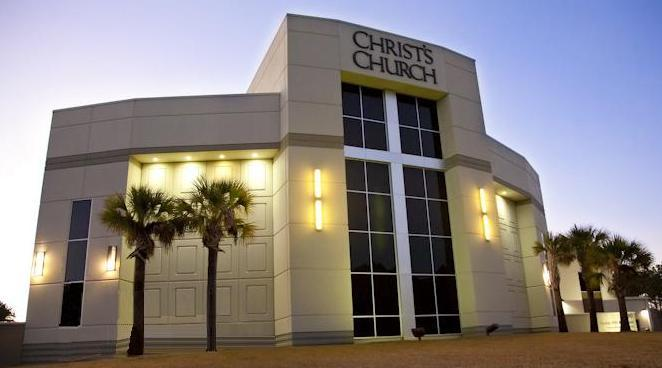
Front of Christ's Church Fleming Island

=== Fleming Island ===
A vacant 40,000-square-foot (3,700 m^{2}) brick Tyson Foods chicken hatchery on U.S. 17 was quickly identified as a possible location. After negotiating a lower price than the $6.3 million originally sought, the church acquired the building in August, 2005 with the help of several church members who made substantial donations. Renovation began soon after, but Christ’s Church Fleming Island did not officially open the doors on their new campus until May 12, 2007. CCFI offers most of the programs available at Christ's Church Jacksonville, including programs for children of all ages during both worship services and a full staff. On May 5, 2019, it was announced during the Sunday service, that the church and property has been sold due rapidly changing culture, rapidly growing community and limited resources. Services would be held at a portable location starting July 28.

=== Camden County, Georgia ===
Another outreach was begun in January 2007, this one in Camden County, Georgia. A group of families began meeting for services at the Camden County Recreation Center in Kingsland with staff supplied by the Jacksonville Christ's Church. Their first full-time pastor, Scott Clevenger, began January 1, 2009. On April 5, 2009, services at Christ’s Church Camden (CCC) were moved from the community room to the gymnasium. Then on January 1, 2010, they purchased the Methodist Children's Home located at 201 Kings Bay Road immediately across from Walmart. Renovations were completed and their first service in the new facility was February 7, 2010. Since that time they have seen a growth rate of over 100%. Christ's Church Camden County no longer relies on staff from either the Jacksonville or Fleming Island campuses of Christ's Church. They continue on as their own independent congregation.

=== St. Augustine Campus ===
Closed

=== River City Campus ===
In 2016, the elder board announced that Christ's Church was to acquire Encounter Christian Church in north Jacksonville. On August 13, 2017, Encounter Christian Church was renamed Christ's Church River City, and held its first services at the former Encounter location with David Mackie being installed as the campus pastor.

=== Prison Campuses ===
Christ's Church has two prison outreach campuses, both located in North Florida. One is held at Florida State Prison, and the other is held at New River Correctional Institution, both located in Starke, Florida.

== Programs ==
=== Missions ===
Church members support missionary work through monetary contributions, send clothes to those in need and help build homes in Mexico and India. Another project assisted handicapped children by constructing a large group home. Pastor Bratton stated: "We want to give people in Third World countries the opportunity to care for themselves. We have a strong commitment to missions."

=== Local ===
At Christmas in 2007, a program helped members "adopt" almost 1200 deserving children, senior citizens and immigrants to help make the season special with gifts and other support. Another project encouraged members to accumulate spare change over a month to fund an initiative for woman.

The church sponsors Freedom Fest, an annual music festival with fireworks in late June, an alternative to 4th of July fireworks. 2016 was the first year Freedom Fest became a benefit fundraiser. Proceeds from the 2016 Freedom Fest were used to help to build a safe house for the victims of human trafficking, and set a record attendance of over 10,000 visitors, while headlining the popular Christian band For King And Country.

On February 12, 2016, the Tim Tebow Foundation partnered with Christ's Church to hold a prom for 250 people with special needs. This event, called the 2016 Night To Shine, was a free prom for people age 16 and older with developmental and/or physical impairments.

=== Sports ===
The church has an extensive sports program for members and attendees. Youth sports include flag football, indoor soccer, basketball & cheerleading, and are coached by adult members in order to develop character, promote sportsmanship and grow as Christians. Adult leagues for men's basketball, flag football for men, women & coed teams, coed volleyball, and golf encourage members to invite their neighbors and friends for Christian fellowship and competition.
