= Thomas N. Carruthers =

Bishop of the Episcopal Diocese of South Carolina

The Right Reverend Thomas Neely Carruthers D.D.
- Bishop of South Carolina
- Church: Episcopal Church
- Diocese: South Carolina
- Elected: January 18, 1944
- In office: 1944–1960
- Predecessor: Albert Sidney Thomas
- Successor: Gray Temple

Orders
- Ordination: May 1926 by Thomas F. Gailor
- Consecration: May 4, 1944 by Henry St. George Tucker

Personal details
- Born: June 10, 1900 Collierville, Tennessee, United States
- Died: June 12, 1960 (aged 60) Seabrook Island, South Carolina, United States
- Buried: Sewanee: The University of the South
- Denomination: Anglican
- Parents: Thomas Neely Carruthers & Linnie Louise Hunter
- Spouse: Ellen Douglas Everett (m. 1927)
- Children: 2
- Education: Sewanee: The University of the South

Thomas Neely Carruthers (June 10, 1900 – June 12, 1960) was bishop of the Episcopal Diocese of South Carolina, serving from 1944 to 1960.

== Early life and education ==
Carruthers was born on June 10, 1900, in Collierville, Tennessee, the son of Thomas Neely Carruthers and Linnie Louise Hunter. He was educated at the Collierville High School, before studying at Sewanee: The University of the South, from where he graduated with a Bachelor of Arts in 1921. He then earned a Master of Arts from Princeton University in 1924. He married Ellen Douglas Everett on December 27, 1927. Carruthers also graduated with a Bachelor of Divinity from the University of the South in 1929, which also honoured him with a Doctor of Divinity in 1940.

== Ordained ministry ==
Carruthers was ordained deacon in June 1925 by Bishop James M. Maxon Coadjutor of Tennessee and priest in May 1926 by Bishop Thomas F. Gailor of Tennessee. He then became rector of St Peter's Church in Columbia, Tennessee in 1926. He became rector of Trinity Church in Houston, Texas in 1931, and then rector of Christ Church in Nashville, Tennessee in 1939.

== Episcopacy ==
On January 18, 1944, Carruthers was elected on the third ballot as Bishop of South Carolina during a special convention which was held in St John's Church in Florence, South Carolina. He was consecrated on May 4, 1944, in St Philip's Church in Charleston, South Carolina, with Presiding Bishop Henry St. George Tucker as chief consecrator. From 1953 till 1956, he served as President of Province IV. At the time of his death, he was also Chancellor of the University of the South.

== Death ==
He died in office on June 12, 1960, in Seabrook Island, South Carolina. He was found dead on the floor of his room, the death being the result of an Intracerebral hemorrhage. His funeral was held at St Philip's Church on June 14 and he was buried in the cemetery of the University of the South.
