= Diocese of West Tennessee =

Episcopal Church diocese in the US

Coordinates: 35.1467°N 90.0369°W

Location
- Country: United States
- Territory: Grand Division
- Ecclesiastical province: IV (Southeast)

Statistics
- Congregations: 29 (2025)
- Members: 5,447 (2025)

Information
- Denomination: Episcopal Church
- Established: January 1, 1983
- Cathedral: St. Mary's Cathedral

Current leadership
- Bishop: Phoebe Alison Roaf

Map
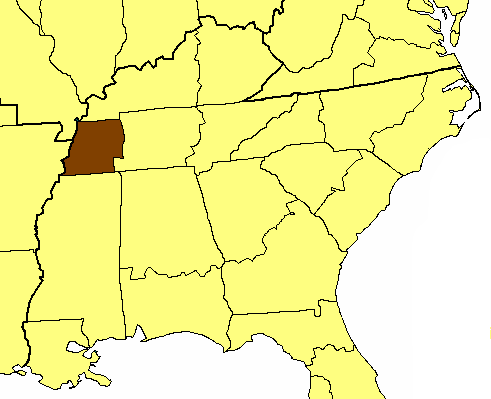
- Location of the Diocese of West Tennessee

Website
- edwtn.org

The Diocese of West Tennessee is the diocese of the Episcopal Church that geographically coincides with the political region known as the Grand Division of West Tennessee. The geographic range of the Diocese of West Tennessee was originally part of the Episcopal Diocese of Tennessee, which was partitioned into three separate dioceses during 1982–1985. Phoebe A. Roaf is the current bishop of West Tennessee. It is headquartered in Memphis, Tennessee on the close of St. Mary's Cathedral.

The diocese reported 7,832 members in 2015 and 6,163 members in 2023. Plate and pledge income for the 29 filing congregations of the diocese in 2024 was $11,165,604. Average Sunday attendance (ASA) in 2024 was 2,028 persons, down from 2,944 in 2015.

== History and development ==
Despite being located in the extreme southwestern corner of Tennessee, Memphis served as the see city for most of the history of the old statewide diocese prior to the first territorial separation in 1983. The oldest Episcopal congregation in the present West Tennessee diocese is Immanuel Church in La Grange (Fayette County) which, like many 19th century churches in that part of the state, primarily served plantations, both owners and slaves. After the American Civil War, missionary emphasis in West Tennessee shifted to the city of Memphis, although the church gradually began appearing in larger towns outside the Mississippi River region as well.

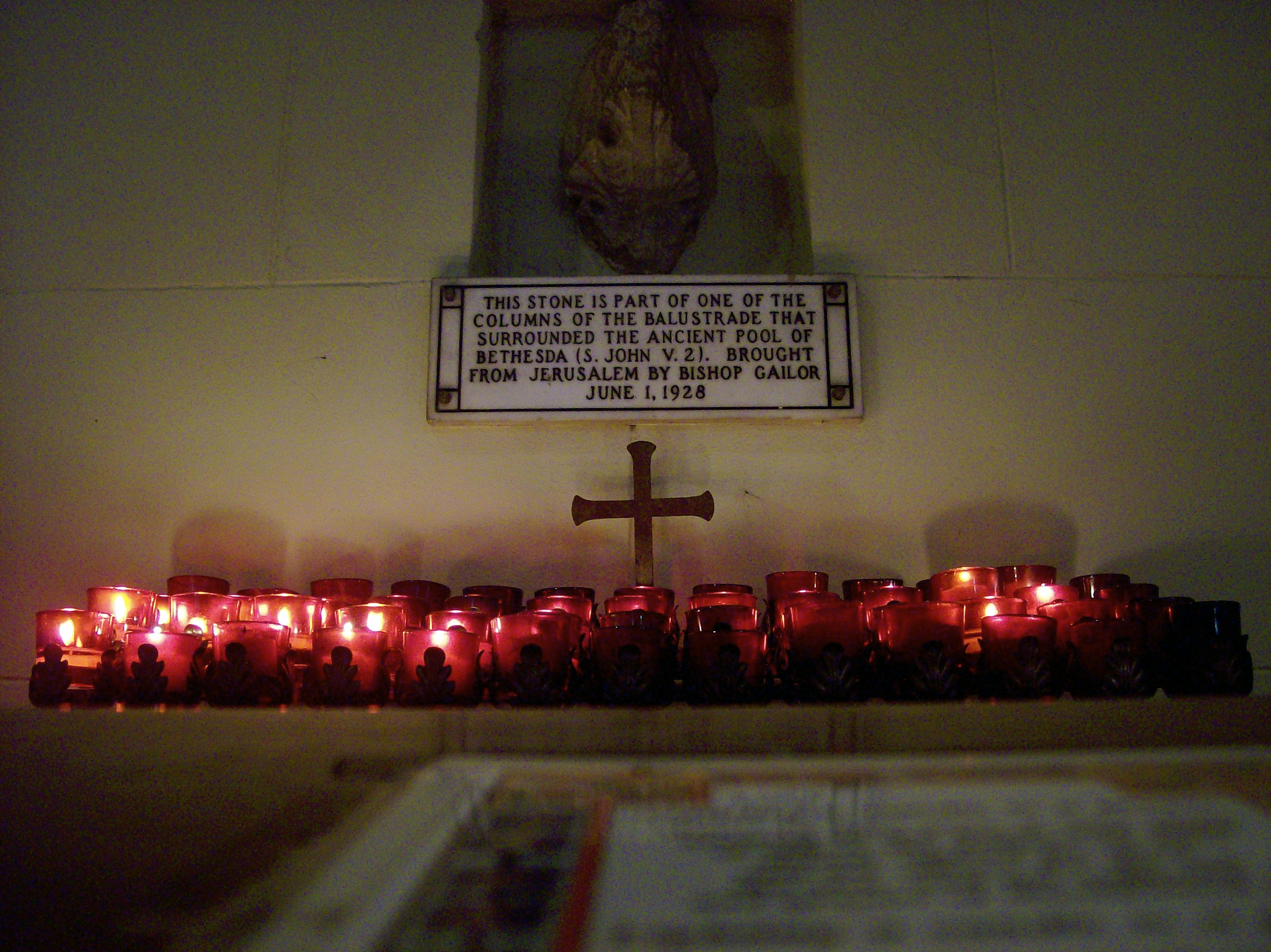
Displayed in the west transept of St. Mary's Episcopal Cathedral in Memphis, Tennessee, this stone is part of one of the columns of the balustrade that surrounded the ancient Pool of Bethesda. Brought from Jerusalem by Thomas F. Gailor, June 1, 1928.

After World War II, three large parishes, Calvary Church, St. Mary's Cathedral (founded in 1858 and a cathedral since 1871), and Grace-St. Luke's Church, began planting missions throughout the Memphis area. The success of these congregations, along with growth elsewhere in the state, prompted then-diocesan bishop John Vander Horst to establish additional offices in Nashville and Knoxville to more effectively serve the other two grand divisions of the state. Vander Horst took up residence and opened an office in Nashville (while maintaining his cathedra in Memphis), while his bishop coadjutor, William E. Sanders, had his office in Knoxville. A suffragan bishop, W. Fred Gates, Jr., worked out of Memphis from 1966 to 1982; he was elected and consecrated partly for that purpose.

It was not until Vander Horst retired in 1977 that talks began to separate the statewide diocese into three territories. Upon the General Convention giving consent to plans at its 1982 meeting, the statewide diocese excised its westernmost counties first, with the new West Tennessee diocese beginning operations on January 1, 1983. Two years later, the easternmost counties of the remaining Tennessee diocesan territory became the Episcopal Diocese of East Tennessee.

Alex Dickson, the first bishop of the diocese, was closely aligned with "orthodox" forces within Anglicanism opposed to the trends away from teaching "Jesus Christ as the one source of salvation and the normative authority of scripture." (In 2000, then-retired Bishop Dickson, still living as of 2020, was involved in the consecration of the first two bishop of the Anglican Mission in the Americas.) During the controversies that racked the denomination nationally in the early 2000s (after Dickson's retirement) over the consecration of a non-celibate gay man, Gene Robinson, to the episcopacy, some clergy and laypeople in the diocese, mostly in suburban Memphis, departed their parishes in favor of continuing Anglican groups. Not a large number did so, however, and the diocese has not been as involved as some other conservative Southern dioceses have in the Anglican realignment movement; an example was the continuing Diocese of Tennessee in the middle part of the state.

The diocesan motto, Ubique Inter Flumina, means "everywhere between the rivers", referring to the Tennessee and Mississippi rivers, which bracket West Tennessee on two sides. This echoes the original motto of the old state-wide Diocese, which was Usque ad Flumen, meaning "even unto the river," referring to the Mississippi River.

Most communicants of this diocese reside in either the city of Memphis or its surrounding suburbs in Shelby County. Elsewhere, only about half or so of the region's counties have congregations, most of which were founded before 1945.

== Bishops ==
1. Alex D. Dickson 1983–1994
2. James Malone Coleman 1994–2001
3. Don Edward Johnson 2001–2019
4. Phoebe Alison Roaf 2019–present

== Bishops of Tennessee before the creation of the Diocese of West Tennessee ==
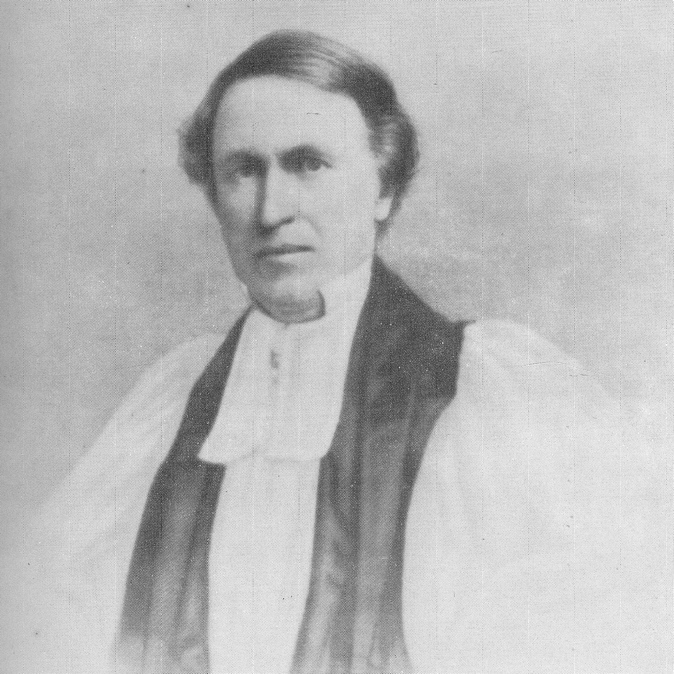
James Hervey Otey, first Bishop of Tennessee

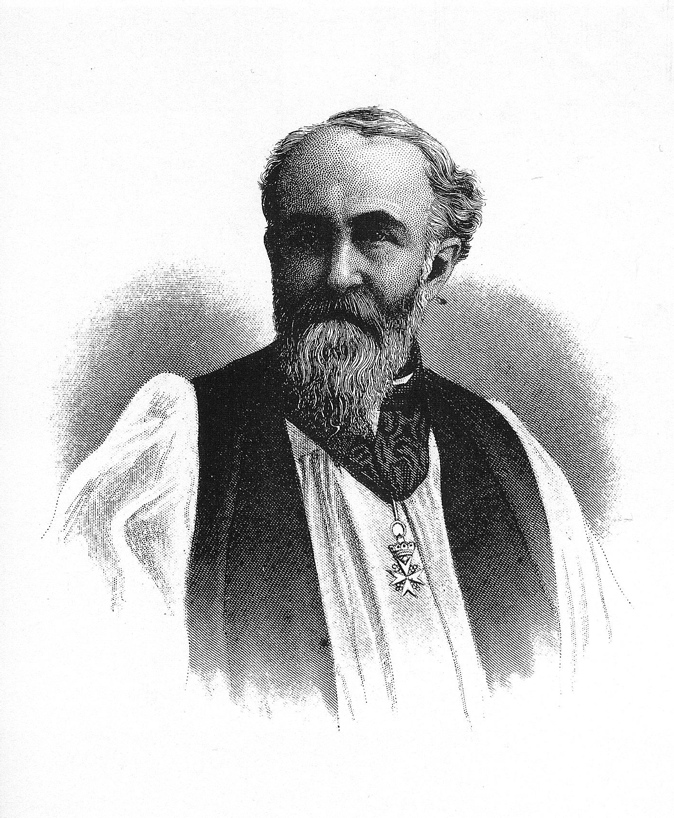
Charles Quintard, second Bishop of Tennessee

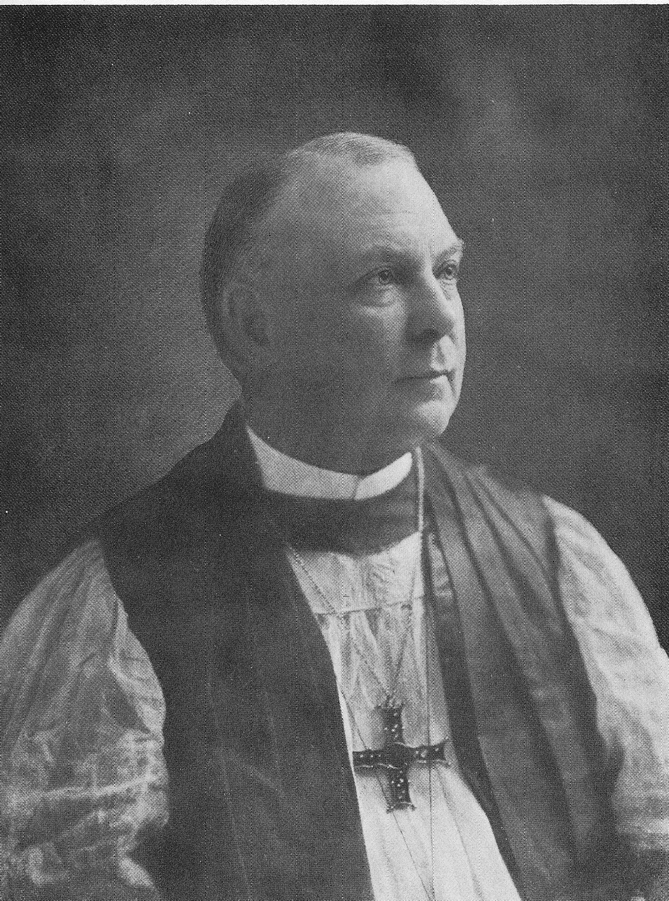
Thomas F. Gailor, third Bishop of Tennessee, President of the National Council

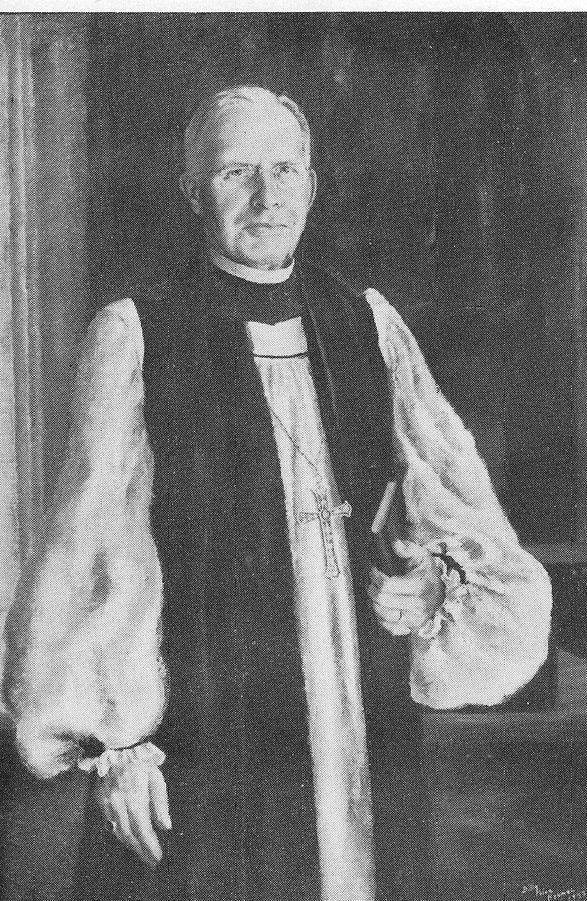
Edmund Dandridge, fourth Bishop of Tennessee

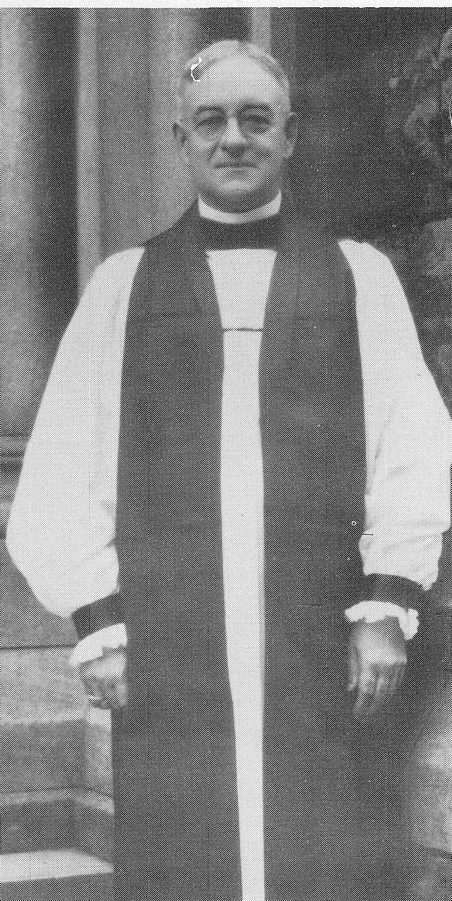
James Maxon, fifth Bishop of Tennessee

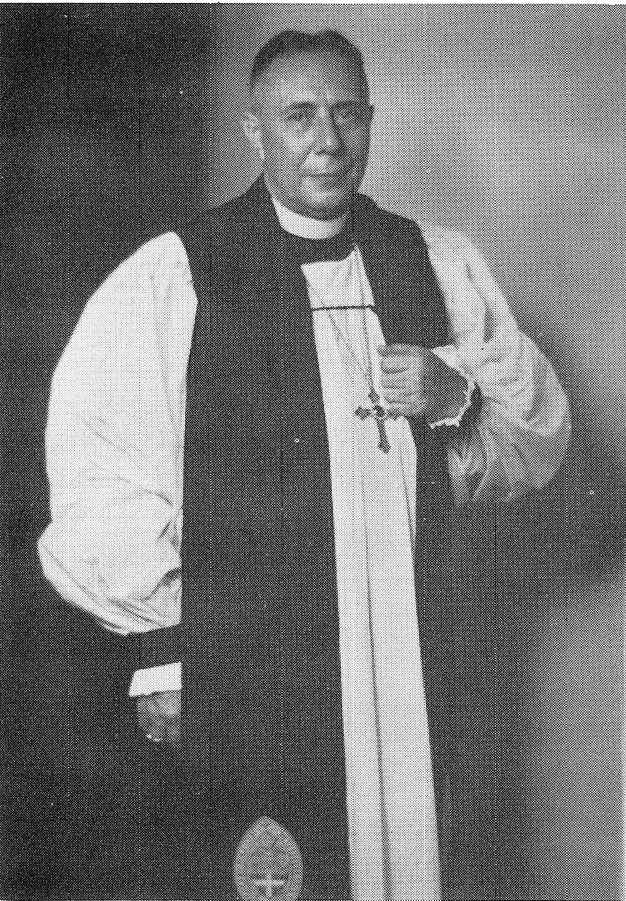
Theodore Barth, sixth Bishop of Tennessee

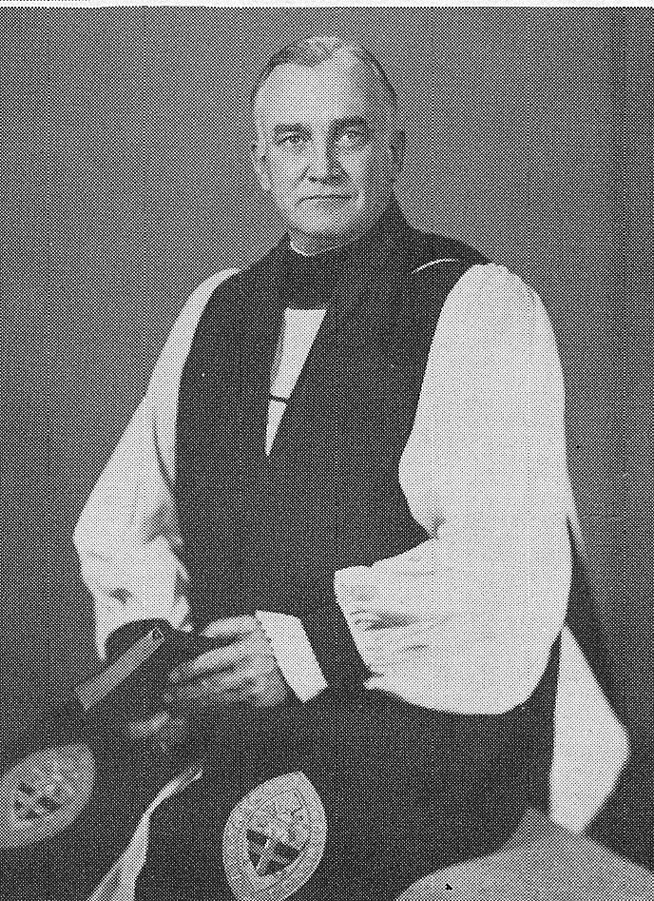
John Vander Horst, seventh Bishop of Tennessee

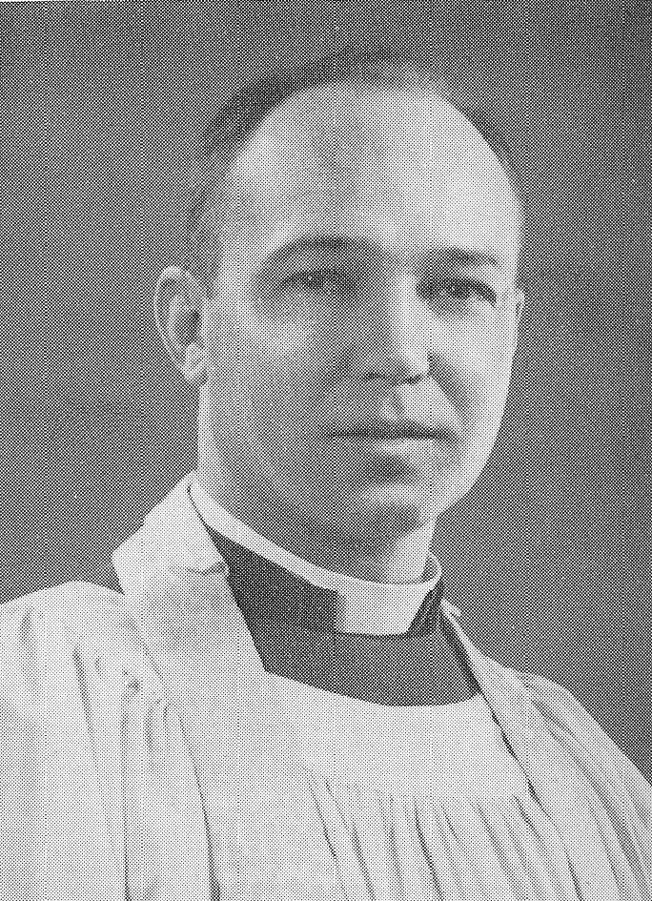
William E. Sanders, Dean of St. Mary's Episcopal Cathedral, eighth Bishop of Tennessee, first Bishop of East Tennessee

== See also ==
- Province 4 of the Episcopal Church in the United States of America
- West Tennessee
- Anglicanism
