= George Lazenby Reynolds =

The Right Reverend George Lazenby Reynolds, Jr D.D.
- Bishop of Tennessee
- Church: Episcopal Church
- Diocese: Tennessee
- Elected: January 26, 1985
- In office: 1985–1991
- Predecessor: William Evan Sanders
- Successor: Bertram Herlong

Orders
- Ordination: 1955 by Theodore N. Barth
- Consecration: June 15, 1985 by John Allin

Personal details
- Born: August 18, 1927 Opelika, Alabama, United States
- Died: November 3, 1991 (aged 64) Nashville, Tennessee, United States
- Buried: University of the South
- Denomination: Anglican
- Parents: George Lazenby Reynolds & Marion Banks Barrett
- Spouse: Barbara Clark (m. June 9, 1962)
- Children: 2
- Education: Sewanee: The University of the South

George Lazenby Reynolds, Jr. (August 18, 1927 – November 3, 1991) was the ninth bishop of the Episcopal Diocese of Tennessee, serving from 1985 to 1991. He was the first bishop to serve the remnant diocese, encompassing the middle third of the state, after the separations of the Diocese of West Tennessee and the Diocese of East Tennessee from the original statewide judicatory, in 1983 and 1985, respectively. He maintained offices in Nashville, as the Tennessee diocese continues to do to this day.

== Biography ==
Reynolds was born in Opelika, Alabama on August 18, 1927. He graduated from Sewanee: The University of the South. He also graduated from Virginia Theological Seminary with a masters of divinity in 1954. He also acquired a Ph.D. degree from New York University in 1970.

== Ordination ==
Reynolds was ordained deacon on July 1, 1954 in Otey Memorial Parish Church by Theodore N. Barth, Bishop of Tennessee, and a priest a year later. He served as rector of St. Stephen's Church in Edina, Minnesota from 1976 until 1985. Prior to this he served parishes in Pennsylvania and Ohio and was chaplain to Sewanee Military Academy, a preparatory school for boys located near the University of the South. He was employed by the Christian Education department of the Episcopal Church Center for six years.

== Bishop ==
On January 26, 1985, Reynolds was elected Bishop of Tennessee, succeeding William E. Sanders, who opted to assume the episcopate in the new East Tennessee diocese (Sanders had worked there for many years prior). Reynolds was consecrated bishop on June 15, 1985 by Presiding Bishop John Allin in the All Saints' Chapel of the University of the South. He died while in office on November 3, 1991.

In May 2023, George Lazenby Reynolds III son of the late bishop, released a complete six-volume set of sermons spanning the 40 years of sermons of his father's work.
