= John Vander Horst =

American bishop

The Right Reverend John Vander Horst D.D., LL.D
- Bishop of Tennessee
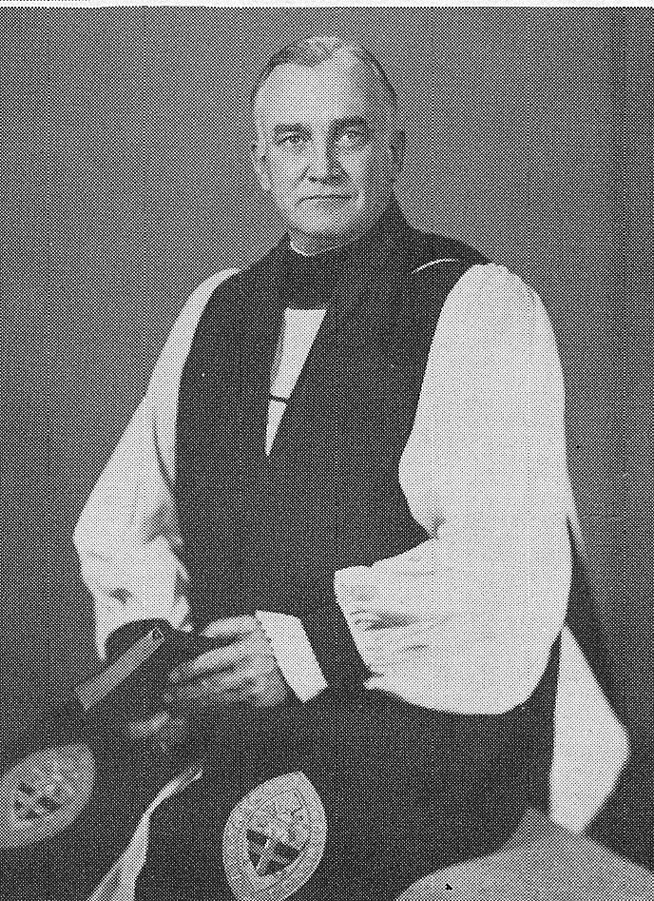
- Church: Episcopal Church
- Diocese: Tennessee
- Elected: April 19, 1961
- In office: 1961–1977
- Predecessor: Theodore N. Barth
- Successor: William Evan Sanders
- Previous posts: Suffragan Bishop of Tennessee (1955-1961); Coadjutor Bishop of Tennessee (1961)

Orders
- Ordination: June 26, 1939 by Edward T. Helfenstein
- Consecration: March 2, 1955 by Henry Knox Sherrill

Personal details
- Born: January 12, 1912 Orange, New Jersey, United States
- Died: April 19, 1980 (aged 68) Marietta, Georgia, United States
- Buried: St. John's Episcopal Church (Ashwood, Tennessee)
- Denomination: Anglican
- Parents: Elias Vander Horst & Ella Virginia Cole
- Spouse: Helen Gray Lawrence
- Children: 4

John Vander Horst (January 12, 1912 – April 19, 1980) was bishop of the Episcopal Diocese of Tennessee from 1961 to 1977.

== Early life and education ==
Vander Horst was born in Orange, New Jersey, on January 12, 1912. He was educated at Baltimore's Gilman School, Princeton University, St. Stephen's House, Oxford and the Virginia Theological Seminary. He held honorary doctorates from his seminary and the School of Theology at the University of the South in Sewanee, Tennessee.

== Priest ==
He was ordained deacon on June 10, 1938 and priest the following year in Maryland. His first appointment was at St. John's Church in Ellicott City, Maryland. He also served as rector of St. Paul's Church in Macon, Georgia from 1942 until 1945 when he moved to Philadelphia's Church of the Good Shepherd. In 1951 he became rector of St. Paul's Church in Chattanooga, Tennessee.

== Bishop ==
In 1955 he was elected Suffragan Bishop of Tennessee. He was consecrated on March 2, 1955, in St. Paul's Church, Chattanooga, Tennessee by Presiding Bishop Henry Knox Sherrill. On April 19, 1961, he was elected as Coadjutor Bishop of Tennessee (successor-in-waiting to the Diocesan) and on October 13 of the same year became the seventh diocesan bishop, upon the death of Bishop Theodore N. Barth. As bishop, he was very active in the revision of the national canon on matrimony, where he asserted that the limitations concerning remarriage could be modified without compromising the church's teaching, which arguments he forwarded to the House of Bishops in 1973. Vander Horst suffered a slight stroke in January 1973 and placed jurisdiction over the Diocese in the hands of the then coadjutor, Bishop William Evan Sanders, for the ensuing year, after which he returned to full activity. He retired in January 1977, on his 65th birthday. He died on April 19, 1980.

It was during Vander Horst's tenure that the organization of the Tennessee diocese, then a statewide body, expanded to three offices, one apiece in each region of the state, mainly due to growth in parishes and missions that began during the episcopate of Edmund P. Dandridge and continued under Bishop Barth. Coadjutor Sanders opened a location in Knoxville to attend to churches in the eastern third of Tennessee, and beginning in 1966, W. Fred Gates, Jr., a bishop suffragan, maintained offices on the close of Memphis' St. Mary's Cathedral (the former statewide headquarters), to provide services and administration for those in the western third of the state, west of the Tennessee River. Vander Horst moved to Nashville and established a rented office for general headquarters and a base from which to shepherd churches in the middle region of Tennessee; however, St. Mary's remained his sacramental home, as no attempt was made to move the cathedral designation to a Nashville parish along with his office. This arrangement was devised because Vander Horst did not wish during his tenure to see the Diocese legally divided, as had happened in several nearby Southern states. However, after his retirement, when Sanders assumed the episcopate, partitioning did occur, from 1983 to 1985, resulting in the present three dioceses in Tennessee. Also, the Nashville office closed after Vander Horst stepped down (the Diocese opted not to elect another suffragan to staff it), and did not reopen until the division was completed, albeit in a different location.

== Personal life ==
Vander Horst married Helen Gray Lawrence of Marietta, Georgia in 1940. They had 4 children.
