= Andree Layton Roaf =

American judge

Associate Justice of the Arkansas Supreme Court
- In office 1995–1996
- Appointed by: Jim Guy Tucker

Personal details
- Born: Andree Yvonne Layton; March 31, 1941 Nashville, Tennessee, U.S.
- Died: July 1, 2009 (aged 68) Little Rock, Arkansas, U.S.
- Spouse: Clifton Roaf
- Children: 4, including Willie Roaf
- Education: Michigan State University; University of Arkansas at Little Rock School of Law

Andree Yvonne Layton Roaf (March 31, 1941 – July 1, 2009) was an Arkansas lawyer and jurist. She was the first African-American woman to serve on the Arkansas Supreme Court, and is the mother of former NFL offensive lineman Willie Roaf.

== Biography ==
=== Early life ===
Andree Layton was born in Nashville, Tennessee. Her father, William W. Layton, was a civil rights official with the Urban League, Michigan Civil Rights Commission, U.S. Department of Agriculture and Federal Reserve Board, as well as a historian and lecturer. She grew up in Columbus, Ohio, White Hall, Michigan, and Muskegon, Michigan, where she graduated from Muskegon Heights High School in 1958. She attended Michigan State University and received a degree in zoology in 1962.

For more than a decade, Roaf pursued a career in the sciences, working as a bacteriologist for the Michigan Department of Health and then for the United States Food and Drug Administration in Washington, D.C. In 1969 she moved to Pine Bluff, Arkansas, where she worked for the Pine Bluff Urban Renewal Agency and then as a biologist for the National Center for Toxicological Research in Jefferson (Jefferson County), Arkansas.

=== Legal education and career ===
In 1975 Roaf decided to change careers, and she entered the William H. Bowen School of Law at the University of Arkansas at Little Rock. She graduated second in her class in 1978. After a year as an instructor at the law school, she went into private practice at a Little Rock law firm that became known as Walker, Roaf, Campbell, Ivory and Dunklin. In 1995 Governor Jim Guy Tucker appointed her to fill a seat on the Arkansas Supreme Court that had become vacant due to the retirement of Justice Steele Hays. She was the second woman, and the first African-American woman, to sit on the court. Prohibited by law from running for re-election, she was appointed by Governor Mike Huckabee to a position on the Arkansas Court of Appeals, where she served until 2006.

In May 2007 Roaf became director of the federal Office of Desegregation Monitoring, supervising the compliance of the public schools in Pulaski County, Arkansas with racial desegregation mandates. She held this position until July 1, 2009, when she collapsed in her Little Rock office and later died at the University of Arkansas for Medical Sciences Medical Center.

=== Personal life ===
Roaf married Clifton George Roaf in 1963. He became a dentist in Pine Bluff and was a member of local and state school boards. They had four children, including former American football player Willie Roaf, an offensive tackle for the New Orleans Saints and Kansas City Chiefs of the NFL who went to 11 Pro Bowls and was elected to the Pro Football Hall of Fame in 2012, and Phoebe Alison Roaf, an Episcopal priest who is the Bishop of West Tennessee. Roaf was an active member of the Grace Episcopal Church in Pine Bluff.

== Awards ==
Andree Layton Roaf was inducted into the Arkansas Black Hall of Fame in 1996. She received an honorary doctor of laws degree and a Distinguished Alumni Award from Michigan State University.

== See also ==
- List of African-American jurists
