= Bertram Herlong =

The Right Reverend Bertram Nelson Herlong D.D., D.Min.
- Bishop of Tennessee
- Church: Episcopal Church
- Diocese: Tennessee
- Elected: January 10, 1993
- In office: 1993–2007
- Predecessor: George Lazenby Reynolds
- Successor: John C. Bauerschmidt

Orders
- Ordination: March 13, 1961 by Edward Hamilton West
- Consecration: June 26, 1993 by Edmond L. Browning

Personal details
- Born: October 16, 1934 Lake City, Florida, United States
- Died: October 21, 2011 (aged 77) Nashville, Tennessee, United States
- Buried: St. John's Episcopal Church (Ashwood, Tennessee)
- Denomination: Anglican
- Parents: Benjamin D. Herlong & Ava T. Phillips
- Spouse: Barbara Ann Vickers
- Children: 2
- Education: University of Florida

Bertram Nelson Herlong (October 16, 1934 - October 21, 2011) was the tenth bishop of the Episcopal Diocese of Tennessee.

== Early life ==
He was born in Lake City, Florida and graduated from Columbia High School in 1952. He received a bachelor's degree in Literature and English from the University of Florida in 1956, and married Barbara Ann Vickers in June, 1957. The couple had two children, Angela and Michele.

== Ministry ==
After the death of his brother, George, Herlong was called to the ministry and enrolled at the University of the South where he was awarded a Bachelor of Divinity in 1959. He was ordained to the diaconate on July 25, 1960 by Edward Hamilton West, Bishop of the Episcopal Diocese of Florida, and to the priesthood by the same bishop on March 13, 1961.

Herlong's ministry began at Church of the Epiphany in Crestview, Florida and he was the first vicar at St. Jude's Church in Valparaiso, Florida. He became Canon Pastor at St. John's Cathedral in Jacksonville, Florida and was Assistant Headmaster and Chaplain at Jacksonville Episcopal High School.

Herlong earned a Master of Sacred Theology degree in 1970 by taking classes over seven summers. He was appointed associate rector of Trinity Church, Wall Street in 1972, becoming vicar of Trinity's St. Paul's Chapel in 1975. Herlong continued his education at the New York Theological Seminary and was awarded a Doctor of Ministry in 1980. He was also active in the community, starting a hospice at Beekman Downtown Hospital in Manhattan and organizing St. Margaret's Housing Center for seniors. He was also a director for the New York Board of Trade.

He became Dean of the Cathedral Church of St. Paul (Detroit) in 1979. The affiliated school was named The Herlong Cathedral School in his honor in 1993. In 1988, he was a candidate in the episcopal election of the Episcopal Diocese of Central Florida before being elected bishop of the Diocese of Tennessee on January 30, 1993. He was consecrated on June 26, 1993 and awarded an honorary Doctor of Divinity degree in 1993.

Herlong's principal consecrators were

- Edmond L. Browning, Presiding Bishop
- Charlie F. McNutt
- Peter James Lee

== Episcopacy ==
He was succeeded as diocesan bishop by John C. Bauerschmidt, eleventh Bishop of Tennessee, who was consecrated on January 27, 2007.

Herlong was a member of the Board of Directors of The Living Church Foundation and episcopal visitor of the Community of Saint Mary, Southern Province. He was considered a leader among conservatives in the Episcopal Church (United States) and made strong efforts to move many of the Tennessee diocese's parishes and missions in that direction during his episcopate, especially in the field of church planting. Controversy over social and theological issues in the larger Episcopal Church colored much of his legacy, particularly in the latter years of the episcopate and after his retirement, as the Diocese encountered extreme and unusual difficulty in electing a successor to him.
