= Phoebe Alison Roaf =

American prelate (born 1964)

The Right Reverend Phoebe Alison Roaf
- Bishop of West Tennessee
- Church: Episcopal Church
- Diocese: West Tennessee
- Elected: November 17, 2018
- In office: 2019–present
- Predecessor: Don Edward Johnson

Orders
- Ordination: July 9, 2008 by Charles Jenkins
- Consecration: May 4, 2019 by Michael Curry

Personal details
- Born: March 8, 1964 (age 62) Lansing, Michigan, United States
- Denomination: Anglican
- Education: Harvard University

Phoebe Alison Roaf (born March 8, 1964) is an American prelate who is the fourth and current Bishop of West Tennessee.

== Early life and education ==
Phoebe Alison Roaf was born on March 8, 1964, in Lansing, Michigan. She is the oldest of four children born to Andree Layton Roaf, the first Black woman to serve on the Arkansas Supreme Court, and Clifton Roaf, a dentist. Her brother Willie is a member of the Pro Football Hall of Fame. The family returned to her father's home of Pine Bluff when Roaf was five and she was raised attending Grace Episcopal Church, where she became involved in the youth group and then the state diocese's youth group.

Roaf completed a bachelor's degree in history at Harvard University and then a master's degree in public policy at Princeton. She later earned a Juris Doctor degree from the University of Arkansas Little Rock School of Law.

In 2008, Roaf graduated from Virginia Theological Seminary with a Masters of Divinity.

== Career ==
Roaf worked as a researcher and analyst for the Joint Legislative Audit and Review Commission in Virginia and for other ventures in Philadelphia, for six years. After law school, she clerked for Judge James L. Dennis of the Court of Appeals Fifth Circuit (New Orleans) for two years, before working in commercial real estate in New Orleans. She left in 2005 to enroll in seminary.

In 2008, Roaf became the first African American woman to be ordained a priest in the Diocese of Louisiana. She was ordained at age 41, and is known to parishioners as "Mother Phoebe". She served as associate rector at Trinity Episcopal Church in New Orleans, where she was the first person of color to serve as a priest. She was called as rector of St Philip's Episcopal Church in Richmond in 2011, the first woman rector in the church's 150 year history.

In November 2018, Roaf was chosen as the Fourth Bishop of West Tennessee by a vote of delegates to the Annual Diocesan Convention. There were three women on the ballot. She was consecrated bishop on May 4, 2019, at Hope Church (a congregation of the Evangelical Presbyterian Church) in Memphis, used because of its large facilities, something no area Episcopal parish had. At the time of her election as bishop she was rector of St. Philip's Episcopal Church in Richmond, Virginia, the largest historically African American Episcopal Church in Virginia.

Roaf is the first woman and the first African American to serve as bishop in West Tennessee, or in any of Tennessee's Episcopal dioceses, and the fifth woman bishop in the history of the Episcopal Church. She was consecrated by Presiding Bishop Michael B. Curry, who said "“To be sure, she and the people of West Tennessee are making history as she is the first woman as well as the first African American to hold such a position. But the real history-making moment is the hope ... She was elected because she is a woman committed to Jesus of Nazareth and His way of love. And that way of love is the way to life for us all, Black or white, Anglo or Latino, rich or poor, liberal or conservative, gay or straight, old or young. And that is a sign of hope for our country and our world. That’s history!”
