= Charles Todd Quintard =

American physician and clergyman (1824–1898)

The Right Reverend Charles Quintard M.D., D.D., LL.D.
- Bishop of Tennessee
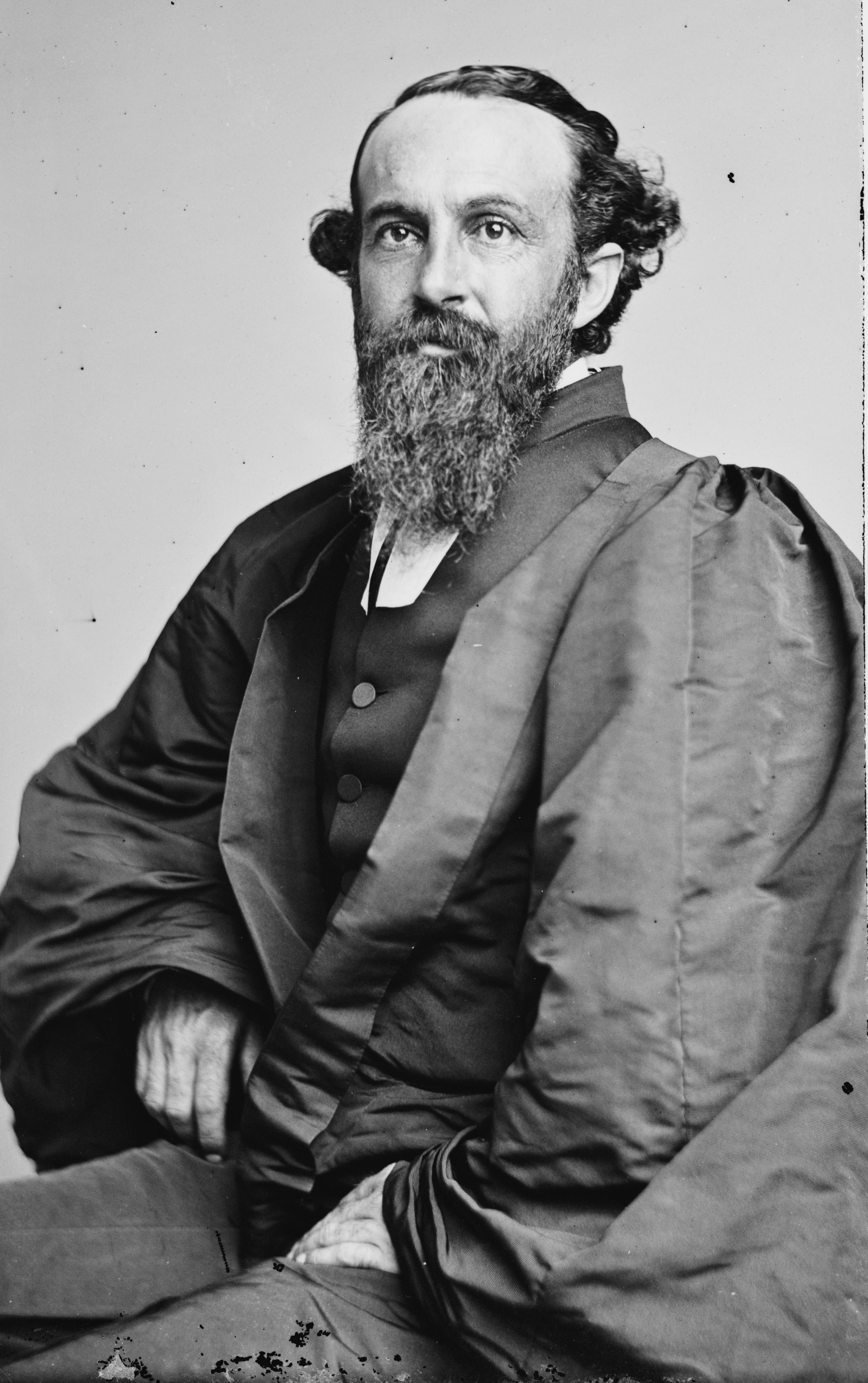
- Charles Quintard in about 1860
- Church: Episcopal Church
- Diocese: Tennessee
- Elected: September 7, 1865
- In office: 1865–1898
- Predecessor: James Hervey Otey
- Successor: Thomas Frank Gailor
- Other posts: Physician, Parish priest, Army chaplain, University vice-chancellor

Orders
- Ordination: January 6, 1856 by James Hervey Otey
- Consecration: October 11, 1865 by John Henry Hopkins

Personal details
- Born: December 22, 1824 Stamford, Connecticut, United States
- Died: February 16, 1898 (aged 73) Meridian, Georgia, United States
- Buried: Sewanee: The University of the South
- Denomination: Anglican
- Parents: Isaac Quintard & Clarissa Hoyt Shaw
- Spouse: Eliza Catherine Hand
- Children: 4

Sainthood
- Feast day: February 16
- Venerated in: Episcopal Church

Charles Todd Quintard (December 22, 1824 – February 16, 1898) was an American physician and clergyman who became the second bishop of the Episcopal Diocese of Tennessee and the first Vice-Chancellor of the University of the South.

== Medical career ==
He was born in Stamford, Connecticut, to a Huguenot-descended family and attended school in New York City, including medical studies at University Medical College, New York University and Bellevue Hospital, graduating in 1847. Quintard moved to Athens, Georgia, in 1848 to take up a medical practice, then moved to Memphis in 1851 to teach physiology and pathological anatomy at Memphis Medical College. Dr. Quintard's 1854 report on Memphis mortality statistics was covered in The New York Times, including his assessment of the city as being "the first considerable place to be without the range of yellow fever," a boast that was to prove incorrect in the 1870s, when Memphis experienced several yellow fever epidemics.

== Priesthood ==
During this time, Quintard became friends with James Hervey Otey, the first bishop of the Episcopal Diocese of Tennessee, resulting in his decision to give up the medical profession for the priesthood. A man of strong talents, Quintard studied for holy orders in 1854, was ordained deacon on January 1, 1855 and priest on January 6, 1856. He subsequently served as the rector of Calvary Church in Memphis and at the Church of the Advent in Nashville.

An adherent of the Oxford Movement (1833-1845), Quintard described himself as a "high churchman" and a "ritualist", identifying with Anglicans who were reviving ritual practices associated, in the popular mind, with Roman Catholicism. In fact, the Oxford Movement leaders attempted to call the Anglican Church to its first principles and roots in history and tradition. To what degree Quintard was actually a Ritualist is a matter of debate. None of the Tractarians was a "ritualist," and the ritualism that developed in the Episcopal Church in the South was rather tame during Bishop Quintard's lifetime, compared to that occurring in England and parts of the Northern U.S. then. Like Bishop Otey, he was of the Southern branch of the old High Church or Hobartian group of Episcopalians. The leaders of the Oxford Movement, also called "Tractarians" for the ninety Tracts for the Times they published, rediscovered the Church of the Creed as something more than an institution or an arm of civil power, as they alleged many evangelical and liberal churchmen to believe. Quintard and his generation were deeply moved by the writings of faithful and brilliant Christian intellectuals such as John Keble (d. 1866), Edward Pusey (d. 1882), and John Henry Newman (d. 1890), who guided many Anglicans into a stronger understanding of the Church as a God-made phenomenon and indeed the mystical Body of Christ in the world. Quintard professed to be "Catholic and Reformed" like many Anglicans, and he assumed, in a manner which did not transcend his culture, that the Church of England and its offspring were in fact the historic Catholic Church for English-speaking peoples.

== American Civil War ==
After the outbreak of the American Civil War, Quintard joined the Rock City Guards, a Nashville militia, as chaplain. He was subsequently nominated by soldiers in the Confederate 1st Tennessee Infantry Regiment, to serve as their chaplain. He accepted this invitation, despite his initial pro-Union stance, and also served as a regimental surgeon. Informally he was known as the Chaplain of the Confederacy. He was the compiler of the Confederate Soldiers' Pocket Manual of Devotions (Charleston, 1863). In 1864, he organized St. Luke's Episcopal Church in Atlanta.

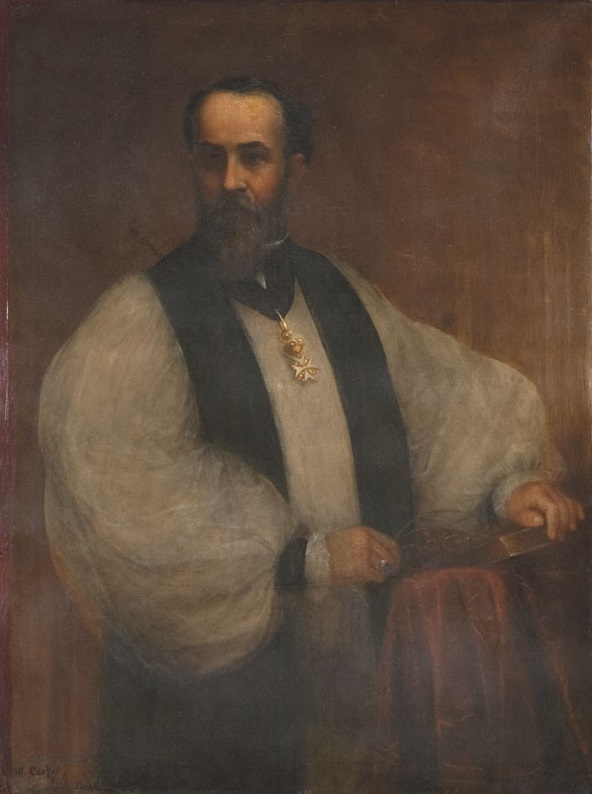
Bishop Quintard, wearing the cross of the English Order of the Hospital of St. John of Jerusalem, which he served as a chaplain for 25 years

== The South's first post-war bishop ==
Bishop Otey died in 1863, but the Diocese of Tennessee was unable to elect a new leader until after the war, on September 7, 1865, when it selected Quintard as its second bishop. The bishops and lay leaders of the national Episcopal Church confirmed his election the next month at the General Convention in Philadelphia. The subsequent consecration of the South's first post-war bishop was viewed as a sign of healing within the church, as evidenced by this comment in the October 13, 1865 New York Times:

The entire service was one to be long remembered by all who witnessed it, and the occasion was one fraught with interest and importance in the history of the Church, as it marked the first step toward that reunion in the Church consequent upon the rapid march of events and the peace which now happily blesses our whole land. It is to be hoped that the occasion will strengthen that harmony which prevails in the convention, and be productive of beneficial results.

Quintard received honorary doctorates from Columbia College (Doctor of Divinity, 1866) and Cambridge (Doctor of Laws, 1867).

== Stewardship of The University of the South in Sewanee, Tennessee ==
Quintard quickly launched rebuilding efforts in his diocese, which had suffered much physical and emotional distress during the war. He also led efforts to ensure the post-war survival of the fledgling University of the South at Sewanee, Tennessee. As the school's vice-chancellor (the institution's chief executive position, despite the name) Quintard sponsored the establishment of a training school for clergy there in 1866 (the present-day School of Theology, one of the official seminaries of the Episcopal Church) and laid the cornerstone for St. Augustine's Chapel in 1867. He traveled to Northern U.S. dioceses to raise funds for the university and went to England three times with the same purpose, returning with large sums of money and many books for the school's library.

Quintard Hall at the university was given by his brother George W. Quintard in 1900. Until 1908 it was the site of the grammar school, and from then until 1971 it was used by the Sewanee Military Academy, a boys' preparatory school. It is now a co-ed residence hall for the University. The University of the South remains an Episcopal institution and is a nationally-recognized center of liberal arts education.

== Cathedral ==
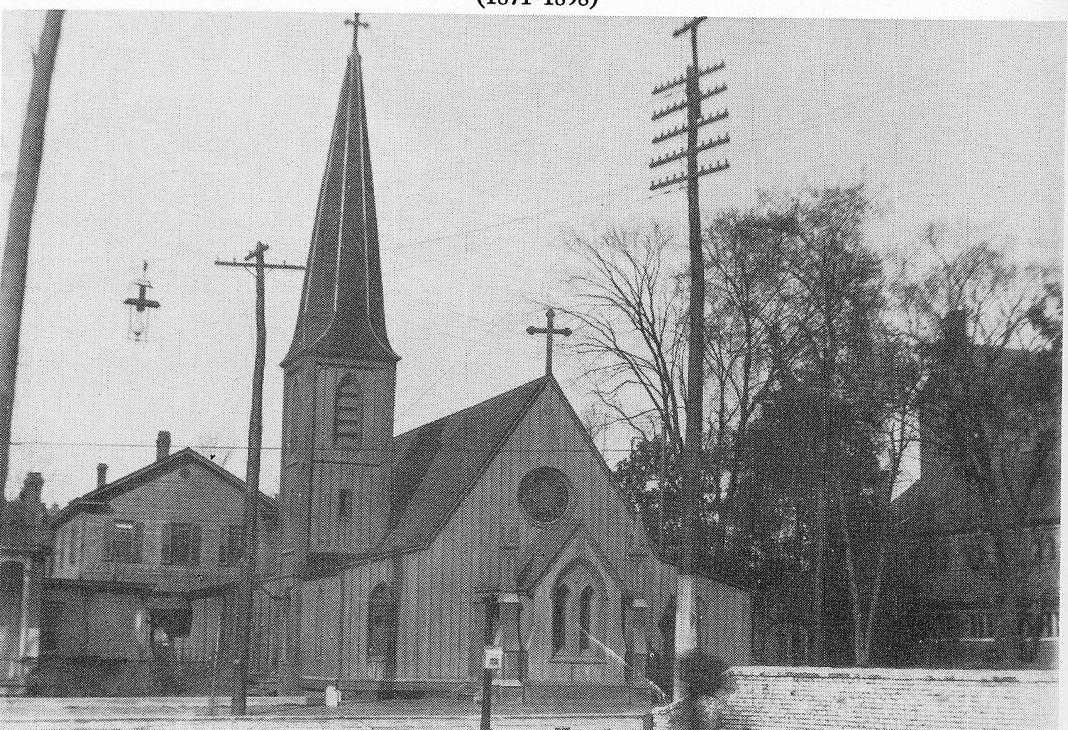
The original St. Mary's Cathedral building, Memphis

At the beginning of 1871, Quintard was presented with the first Episcopal cathedral in the South, when the parish church of St. Mary in Memphis symbolically presented him with keys to the building. While the bishop retained his ecclesiastical seat (literally cathedra, in Latin) in Memphis, he continued to live in Sewanee with his family. He ceded the "Bishop's House" on the close of St. Mary's Cathedral to the sisters of the Community of St. Mary for their educational and humanitarian missions.

Quintard believed that his mission was to make the Episcopal Church in Tennessee "a refuge for all—the lame, halt and blind as well as the rich." He opposed parish pew rents, a then-common method of raising funds, and fostered a ministry on behalf of the disadvantaged. Concerned by the effects of industrialization on workers, he established a refuge for the poor in Memphis in 1869, and in 1873 he advocated a plan to assist people lacking food, housing, and education. Quintard started missions for the laborers at foundries in South Pittsburg (1876) and in Chattanooga (1880). Hoping that the Episcopal Church would also expand its evangelistic work among African Americans, he opposed plans to segregate the black congregations of the denomination, and he assisted in the founding of Hoffman Hall, a seminary for African Americans adjacent to Fisk University in Nashville.

Although Bishop Quintard traveled five times to England, helping to mend relations with the Church of England, he also became involved in the Gallican movement in France. This started with an 1875 trip, a gift of his friend Sam Noble, to enroll his son George at a private school in Paris as well as to lead Sam's children Ned and Addie around England, France, Switzerland and Germany. He met the Rev. Morgan Dix of Trinity Church, New York, who was laying a cornerstone for Victoria Chapel, as well as Père Hyacinthe Loyson.

== Death and legacy ==
Quintard died in February 1898 in Meridian, Georgia, having traveled and stayed there in an effort to improve his health.

== Selected works ==
- An address delivered before the graduating class of the Medical College of Georgia : March 1851 at the Internet Archive (1851)
- A report on the health and mortality of the city of Memphis, Tenn., for the year 1852 at the Internet Archive (1853)
- A few words about Lent at the Internet Archive (1861)
- The Confederate soldiers' pocket manual of devotions at the Internet Archive (1863)
- Balm for the weary and the wounded at the Internet Archive (1864)
- A plain tract on Confirmation, for parochial use at the Internet Archive (1864)
- A sermon preached in St. Luke's Church, Philadelphia, October 11, 1865, before the General Convention of the Protestant Episcopal Church, on the occasion of the consecration of the Rev. Charles Todd Quintard, M.D., as Bishop of the Diocese of Tennessee at the Internet Archive (1865)
- Doctor Quintard, Chaplain C.S.A. and Second Bishop of Tennessee at the Internet Archive (1905)
- Bishop Quintard's Samson sermon at the Internet Archive (1913)

== See also ==
- St. Mary's Episcopal Cathedral in Memphis
- Episcopal Diocese of Tennessee
- Sewanee: The University of the South
