= Theodore N. Barth =

American Episcopal bishop (1898–1961)

The Right Reverend Theodore Nott Barth D.D.
- Bishop of Tennessee
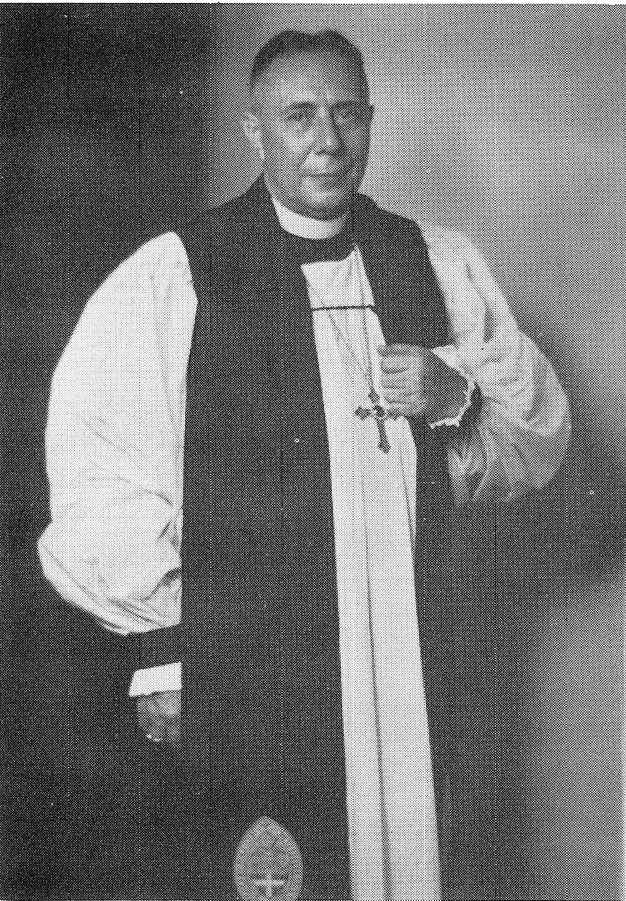
- Church: Episcopal Church
- Diocese: Tennessee
- In office: 1953–1961
- Predecessor: Edmund P. Dandridge
- Successor: John Vander Horst
- Previous post: Coadjutor Bishop of Tennessee (1948-1953)

Orders
- Ordination: October 1922 by John Gardner Murray
- Consecration: September 21, 1948 by Henry Knox Sherrill

Personal details
- Born: July 11, 1898 Mount Savage, Maryland, United States
- Died: August 22, 1961 (aged 63) Memphis, Tennessee, United States
- Buried: St. John's Episcopal Church (Ashwood, Tennessee)
- Denomination: Anglican
- Parents: George Godfrey Barth & Mary Elizabeth Markel
- Spouse: Elizabeth Pike Ellicott
- Children: 2

Theodore Nott Barth (July 11, 1898 – August 22, 1961) was bishop of the Episcopal Diocese of Tennessee from 1953 to 1961.

== Early life and education ==
Barth was born in Mount Savage, Maryland on July 11, 1899. He graduated from the University of Virginia with a B.A. degree in 1918 and later from Virginia Theological Seminary with a Bachelor of Divinity in 1923. He was awarded an honorary Doctor of Divinity by Southwestern University in 1943.

== Priesthood ==
He was made deacon on December 17, 1921, and ordained to the priesthood in October 1922. Bishop John Gardner Murray of Maryland ordained him in both instances. He was appointed as rector of Deer Creek Parish in Harford County, Maryland, a post he held until 1924, when he became rector of the parishes of Reisterstown, Maryland and Western Run, Baltimore County. In 1928 he became rector of St. Bartholomew's Church in Ten Hills, Baltimore and in 1940 he transferred to the position of rector of Calvary Church in Memphis, Tennessee. Between 1943 and 1946 he also served as a deputy to the General Convention from the Diocese of Tennessee.

== Bishop ==
Barth was elected as Coadjutor Bishop of Tennessee on April 20, 1948 on the seventh ballot. He was consecrated in his old parish of Calvary Church on September 21, 1948, with Presiding Bishop Henry Knox Sherrill as principal consecrator. He succeeded as diocesan Bishop of Tennessee on September 21, 1953. He remained bishop until his death on August 22, 1961.

Barth presided over growth in the statewide diocese, occurring largely due to population increases in the four major metropolitan areas of the state, where existing parishes established rapidly-developing mission congregations that soon became parishes in their own right. A considerable number of parishes in the state today derive from church planting work done under his aegis and direction. In this, he built upon the efforts of his predecessor, Edmund P. Dandridge, and the development would continue under his successor, John Vander Horst.

== Legacy ==
Barth is the namesake for the Episcopal student center at the University of Memphis, located west of the campus. It operated originally from 1967 to 2011, when the Diocese of West Tennessee (successor in the Memphis area to the original statewide diocese) closed it, due to funding and staffing shortages, for nine years. After significant renovation of the building and appointment of a priest, the West Tennessee Diocese returned it to operation in the Fall semester of 2020, according to the organization's Facebook page.
