= Christ Church Cathedral (Nashville, Tennessee) =

Episcopal cathedral in Tennessee, US

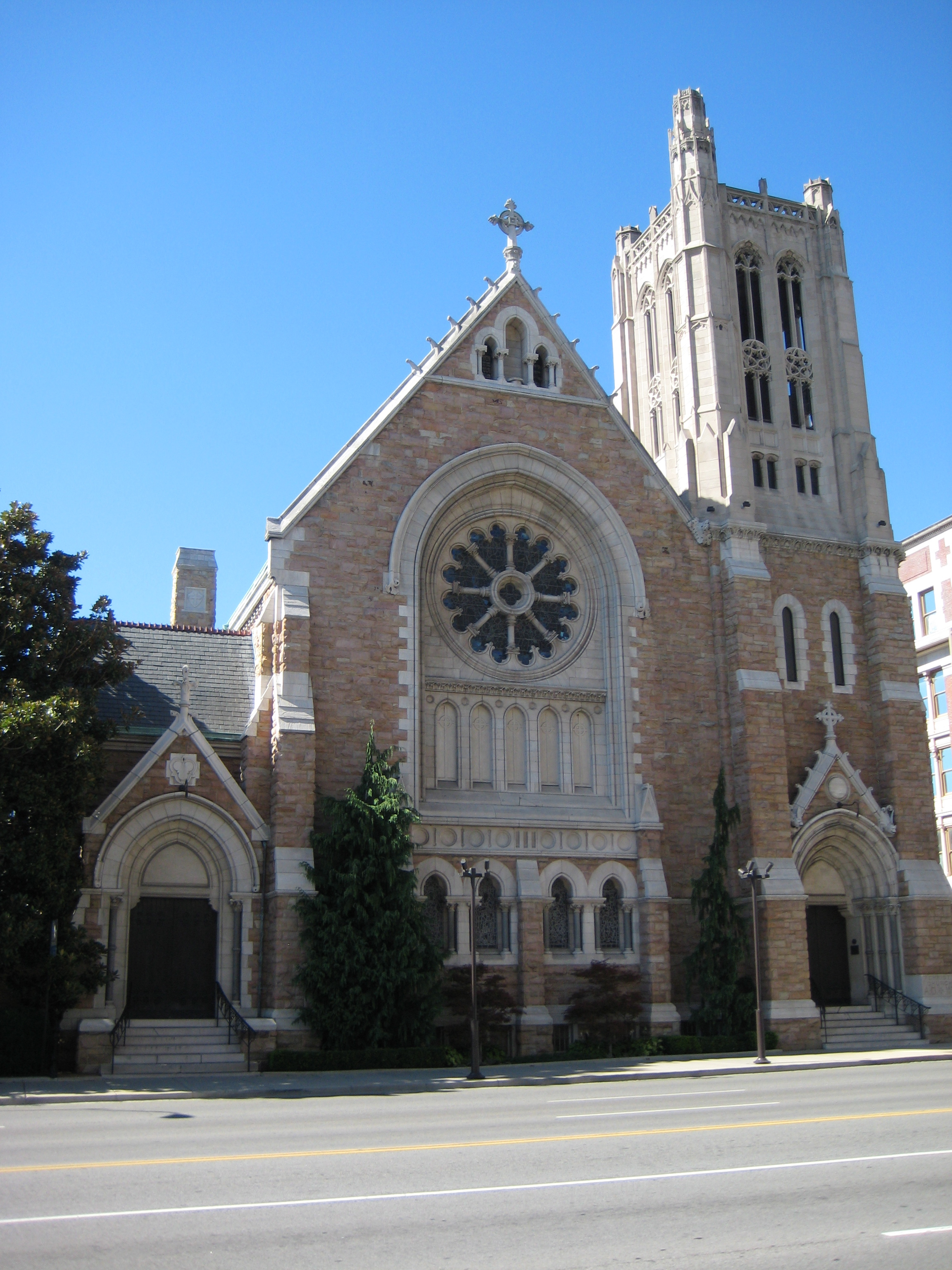

Religion
- Affiliation: The Episcopal Church
- Province: IV (Southeast)
- Ecclesiastical or organisational status: Cathedral
- Leadership: Diocese: Episcopal Diocese of Tennessee; Bishop: The Rt. Rev. John C. Bauerschmidt; Dean: The Very Rev. Serena Sides

Location
- Location: 900 Broadway Nashville, TN, USA
- Interactive map of Christ Church Cathedral
- Coordinates: 36.158875°N 86.78283°W

Architecture
- Architects: Francis Kimball (Main building); Russell E. Hart (Tower)
- Type: Parish church
- Style: Gothic Revival
- Completed: 1894 (Main building); 1947 (Tower)

Specifications
- Direction of façade: South
- Materials: Sandstone

Website
- http://www.christcathedral.org

Christ Church Cathedral in Nashville, Tennessee, is the cathedral church of the Episcopal Diocese of Tennessee in the Episcopal Church in the United States of America. The congregation was founded in 1829 and became the diocesan cathedral, by designation, in 1997.

In 2022, the cathedral reported 2,209 members. In 2025, it reported 1,673 members Plate and pledge financial support reported by the cathedral in 2025 was $2,003,582. Average Sunday Attendance (ASA) reported by the cathedral in 2025 was 387 persons. This was a relative decrease from ASA of 685 persons reported in 2017.

== Music and liturgies ==
The Cathedral Choir at Christ Church has been recognized by the Nashville Scene as the "Best Church Music" in Nashville at times. The choir participates in Sunday services as well as other services throughout the year.

In addition to four Sunday liturgies, the cathedral maintains a rhythm of daily Morning Prayer and daily celebrations of the Holy Eucharist. Other special liturgies of the cathedral that happen throughout the year include Choral Evensong (usually with Benediction of the Blessed Sacrament), the Feast of St. Francis and blessing of animals, and the Feast of St. Nicholas.

== See also ==
- List of the Episcopal cathedrals of the United States
- List of cathedrals in the United States
