= Diocese of Tennessee =

Episcopal Church diocese in the US

Location
- Country: United States
- Ecclesiastical province: IV (Southeast)

Statistics
- Congregations: 45 (2024)
- Members: 15,460 (2023)

Information
- Denomination: Episcopal Church
- Established: July 1, 1829
- Cathedral: Christ Church Cathedral

Current leadership
- Bishop: John C. Bauerschmidt

Map
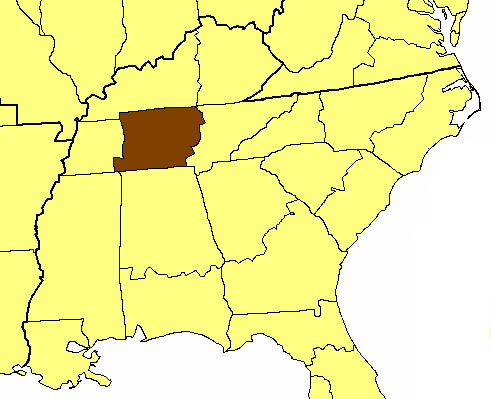
- Location of the Diocese of Tennessee

Website
- edtn.org

The Diocese of Tennessee is the diocese of the Episcopal Church in the United States of America that covers roughly Middle Tennessee. A single diocese spanned the entire state until 1982, when the Episcopal Diocese of West Tennessee was created; the Diocese of Tennessee was again split in 1985 when the Episcopal Diocese of East Tennessee was formed. It is headquartered in Nashville, Tennessee.

The diocese reported 16,904 members in 2019 and 15,460 members in 2023; no membership statistics were reported in 2024 national parochial reports. Plate and pledge income for the 45 filing congregations of the diocese in 2024 was $17,958,668. Average Sunday attendance (ASA) in 2024 was 4,298 persons, down from 5,489 in 2015.

The diocese includes 45 parishes and mission outposts. Most of its present communicants reside in the metropolitan Nashville area (chiefly Davidson, Rutherford, Sumner, and Williamson counties). St. Paul's Church in Franklin is the diocese's oldest congregation.

== Episcopate and offices ==
John C. Bauerschmidt was consecrated as the eleventh Bishop of Tennessee on January 27, 2007. He is the third bishop to serve since the final territorial separation in 1985; his predecessors were George L. Reynolds (1985–91) and Bertram Nelson Herlong (1993–2005).

The seat of the bishop is Christ Church Cathedral in Nashville, which was designated the diocesan cathedral in 1997. Weekday diocesan offices are located at the former property of St. Andrew's Church in the Green Hills neighborhood (see below for background information). From 1985 to 2013, the Diocese maintained offices in closer proximity to downtown Nashville but has not occupied, nor at present intends to, any portion of its cathedral, which was a pre-existing parish prior to its designation, with office space.

From 1871 until the division of the diocese (1982–1983), the seat of the bishop was St. Mary's Episcopal Cathedral in Memphis; it continues today as the cathedral of the Episcopal Diocese of West Tennessee.

Bishops of Tennessee

No.	Name	Years
I	James Hervey Otey	1834–1863
II	Charles Todd Quintard	1865–1898
III	Thomas Frank Gailor	1898–1935
IV	James Matthew Maxon	1935–1947
V	Edmund P. Dandridge	1947–1953
VI	Theodore Nott Barth	1953–1961
VII	John Vander Horst	1961–1977
VIII	William Evan Sanders	1977–1985
IX	George Lazenby Reynolds	1985–1991
X	Bertram Nelson Herlong	1993–2007
XI	John Crawford Bauerschmidt	2007–Present

== History and development ==
In a history of the diocese published in celebration of its 175th anniversary, Herlong, the 10th bishop of the diocese, writes:

For 175 years, the Diocese of Tennessee has proclaimed the Gospel of Jesus Christ in the Episcopal manner and tradition. On July 1–2, 1829, the fledgling church gathered at the Masonic Hall in Nashville to hold the primary convention of the Protestant Episcopal Church in the State of Tennessee. Three clergy and six laymen representing four congregations met with John Stark Ravenscroft, Bishop of the Diocese of North Carolina, presiding. In that same year, the 16th general Convention meeting in Philadelphia on August 12–20 admitted the church in the state of Tennessee into union with the General Convention.

Since that time, the Episcopal Church in Tennessee has grown and now consists of three dioceses with 137 congregations and 37,518 baptized members.

Someone recently told me that the past is the prologue to the future. I believe that is true. We have a "goodly heritage" as Episcopalian Christians and we can face the future with confidence and hope. In our time and generation may we be faithful and continue the mission and ministry so well begun by those who have gone before.

Much of the early growth of the Diocese of Tennessee occurred in plantation regions, mainly centered in the hilly, fertile tobacco-growing region south of Nashville and in the cotton-producing lands of the Mississippi River region in southwestern Tennessee, the church being imported by Anglican loyalists from Virginia and North Carolina. It was not until after the American Civil War that the Episcopal church penetrated much of East Tennessee, and well into the 20th century before many other towns elsewhere in the state got their own churches. The University of the South, located on the Cumberland Plateau in Sewanee, Tennessee, however, helped the fledgling diocese in matters of clergy development. As with much of American Protestantism during the period after World War II, the Episcopal Church flourished in newly-developing suburban areas, a large number of the new churches being missions founded by long-established in-town parishes.

=== Partition ===
By the 1960s and during the episcopate of John Vander Horst, enough growth had taken place that the diocese had established offices in Nashville and Knoxville in addition to the cathedral in Memphis in order to economically provide episcopal care to parishes and missions throughout the state; Vander Horst maintained the central Diocesan office in Nashville, by the 1970s in a rented shopping center office complex, while keeping his seat (literally cathedra) at St. Mary's Cathedral in Memphis. Vander Horst's bishop coadjutor, William E. Sanders, maintained offices in Knoxville to serve the eastern third of the state, while a suffragan bishop (with no right of succession to the Diocesan position, unlike Sanders), W. Fred Gates, Jr., worked out of Memphis from 1966 to 1982 to tend to churches in the western third of Tennessee; he also served as the Diocese's chief financial officer.

The process for division of the state into three territories began when Vander Horst (who opposed it steadfastly during his episcopate) retired in 1977, under the aegis of his successor, Sanders. Upon approval by the General Convention of the Episcopal Church in 1982, the diocese excised its western counties first in 1983, followed by the eastern counties two years later. The remaining territory in Middle Tennessee became the legal successor to the statewide diocese. Between 1977 and 1985 and during the Sanders episcopate, the formal office of the statewide diocese moved to Knoxville due to his succession to the position as Diocesan, with the Nashville office closing upon Vander Horst's retirement. The Nashville office reopened after the 1985 (East Tennessee) separation in a different location, and has moved twice since then.

Each of the three realigned dioceses retained an important legacy of the former statewide body: West Tennessee had St. Mary's Cathedral; the diocese in Middle Tennessee retained the name "Diocese of Tennessee" and the status as the Episcopal Church's sixteenth diocese; and the East Tennessee diocese welcomed Sanders, eighth bishop of Tennessee, as its own first bishop.

=== Task Force on Anti-Racism ===
In June 2017, the diocese's Task Force on Anti-Racism and Lipscomb University's Christian Scholars' Conference organized a service held at the Fisk University Memorial Chapel in memory of 1892 lynching victim Ephraim Grizzard.

== List of parishes ==
- All Saints, Smyrna
- Calvary Church, Cumberland Furnace
- Christ Church, Tracy City
- Christ Church Cathedral, Nashville
- Church of Our Savior, Gallatin
- Church of the Advent, Nashville
- Church of the Epiphany, Lebanon
- Church of the Epiphany, Sherwood
- Church of the Good Shepherd, Brentwood
- Church of the Holy Cross, Murfreesboro
- Church of the Holy Spirit, Nashville
- Church of St. Mark and St. Paul on the Mountain (formerly Otey Memorial Parish), Sewanee
- Church of the Messiah, Pulaski
- Church of the Redeemer, Shelbyville
- Church of the Resurrection, Franklin
- Grace Chapel, Rossview
- Grace Church, Spring Hill
- Holy Trinity Church, Nashville
- St. Agnes' Mission, Cowan
- St. Ann's Church, Nashville
- St. Anselm's Church, Nashville
- St. Augustine's Chapel (Vanderbilt University), Nashville
- St. Barnabas' Church, Tullahoma
- St. Bartholomew's Church, Nashville
- St. Bede's Church, Manchester
- St. David's Church, Nashville
- St. George's Church, Nashville
- St. James' Church, Dickson
- St. James' Church, Sewanee
- St. James the Less, Madison
- St. Joseph of Arimathea, Hendersonville
- St. Luke's Church, Springfield
- St. Mark's Church, Antioch
- St. Mary Magdalene Church, Fayetteville
- St. Matthew's Church, McMinnville
- St. Michael's Church, Cookeville
- St. Paul's Church, Franklin
- St. Peter's Church, Columbia
- St. Philip's Church, Nashville
- Trinity Church, Clarksville
- Trinity Church, Winchester

== Controversies, 2000s and 2010s ==
Beginning with the Herlong episcopate in the 1990s, the diocese embarked on an aggressive church extension program, particularly to the fast-growing suburbs of Nashville. Most of the clergy recruited to serve those missions were conservative evangelical in orientation, and some of them, along with their laity, expressed sympathy for the Anglican realignment movement after V. Gene Robinson, a non-celibate gay man, was consecrated to the episcopacy of New Hampshire in 2003. Some established parishes and missions were served by conservative priests during this period also.

The diocese became highly polarized as these theologically conservative clergy and some of their laity, supported by the Bishop, objected vocally to increased social and theological liberalism within the Episcopal church. Their positions brought them into conflict with other clergy and laity, mostly in the Nashville and Sewanee areas, who supported a more Broad Church tradition. Prior to that time, the general theological orientation among Tennessee Episcopalians had been toward liberalization and tolerance, especially since the 1960s, despite outspoken opposition by traditionalists.

Matters came to a head when the diocese attempted to elect a successor bishop upon Herlong's retirement in 2006. With delegates to the diocesan convention sharply divided and thus unable to come to a decision from a first slate of nominees, another slate had to be submitted, and even then, the voting required numerous ballots and several adjourned sessions to complete, a situation highly unusual for an American Episcopal diocese. Finally, the diocesan convention settled on Bauerschmidt, a moderate.

Disappointed in the results of the election, and fueled by the national church's refusal to reconsider its socially liberal positions on numerous issues including homosexuality, some conservatives began to withdraw from the diocese and align with alternate Anglican structures.

Some of the effects from the dismay on the part of conservatives include the following:

- Some communicants and members of St. Bartholomew's Church in Nashville, St. Barnabas' Church in Tullahoma, and All Saints' Church in Smyrna (the latter a recent new church start) left their respective congregations in order to form continuing Anglican churches. St. Bartholomew's had been noted as one of the first Southern parishes that embraced the charismatic movement in the 1970s, under then-rector Charles H. Murphy, Jr.; the legacy left behind was a conservative evangelicalism that was for years quite distinctive among the area's Episcopal congregations. All three congregations have moved more toward a moderate-to-liberal stance.
- Most of the membership of two congregations, Winchester's Trinity Church and Murfreesboro's Holy Cross Church, left, including their rectors, to, again, establish continuing Anglican congregations. The remaining communicants are in the process of rebuilding their churches under new clerical leadership who are, unlike their predecessors, loyal to the national Episcopal Church. The Winchester church eventually joined the Southeast Tennessee Episcopal Ministry (STEM) group of small mission churches near Sewanee, established originally in the late 19th and early 20th centuries mainly to provide pastoral training for students at the School of Theology of the University of the South, in order to provide regular clerical leadership. The Murfreesboro "splinter" church later closed.
- Three conservative-oriented missions started during the Herlong episcopate, located in Franklin, Thompson's Station, and Clarksville, closed due to membership defection and leadership changes. Another in Goodlettsville joined a nearby parish (officially a merger) in Hendersonville, several years after its founding priest resigned his orders and joined the Roman Catholic Church, and because of the effect the economic recession of the late 2000s had on mission funding in the diocese.
- A small mission near Sewanee, St. Agnes' Church in Cowan, separated itself from the STEM group ministry (see above) in order to have a conservative vicar of its own.
- On October 30, 2009, the Diocese filed a complaint in the Chancery Court of Davidson County, seeking the property of St. Andrew's Church in Nashville, an Anglo-Catholic parish that, according to the diocese, discontinued participation in the Diocese in order to align itself with the Anglican Diocese of Quincy, an Anglo-Catholic judicatory based in Illinois. In April 2010, the court ruled in favor of the diocese, but the parish appealed the ruling, eventually going all the way to the Tennessee Supreme Court. In its fight against the Diocese, the St. Andrew's rector and vestry pointed to a special 1960s agreement made by the parish with then-bishop Vander Horst entitling it to own its property in the case of a division, an apparent exception to the denomination's norm. The Diocese countered with the argument that in 1979, the General Convention adopted the "Dennis Canon," which invalidated such arrangements and declared unequivocally that dioceses owned mission properties outright and that parishes could not secede from the Episcopal Church and keep their properties, at least not without due compensation. After the 2004 approval of the Robinson consecration, the parish removed the word "Episcopal" from its signage and its official name, to signal its sharp disapproval of the actions of General Convention. The parish had a long history, as do many other Anglo-Catholic parishes in the U.S., in involvement in conservative protest against national policies, going to back to its opposition to the revision of the Book of Common Prayer and women's ordination in the 1970s. By late 2012, the parish had lost its appeal to the state Supreme Court and was forced to vacate its premises on Christmas Day, moving to a nearby Lutheran Church–Missouri Synod congregation's facilities and severing its last remaining tie with the Episcopal Church. The Court held that the Episcopal Church was, by its mode of governance, an inherently "hierarchical" denomination whose congregations had no direct right to secede. This was construed in contrast to "congregational" groups (such as Baptists), where local churches were legally independent and had the right to affiliate with a body of their choosing.

During the 2013 Diocesan Convention, Bauerschmidt announced that the Diocese would relocate its offices to the property in September 2013. This marked the first time since the 1985 contraction of the Diocese's territory that it had a headquarters in its own name, rather than operating from a rental property.

== Gallery of bishops ==
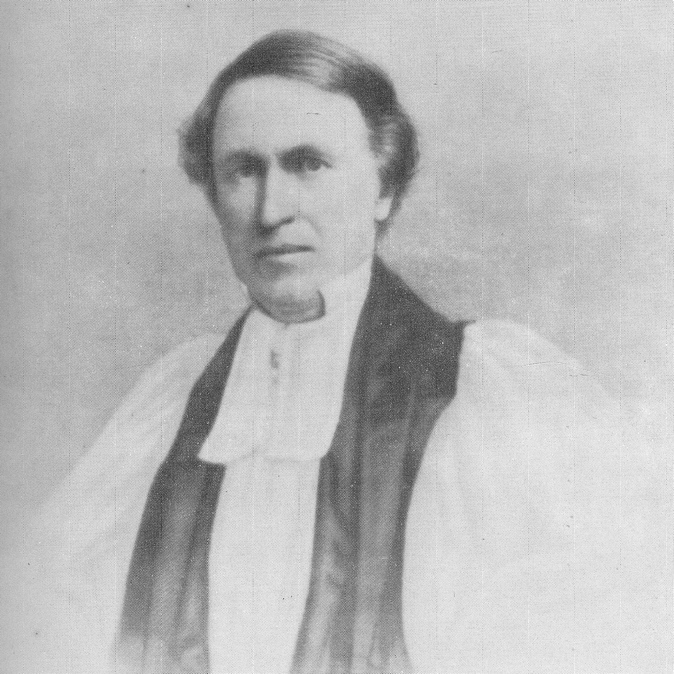
James Hervey Otey, first Bishop of Tennessee

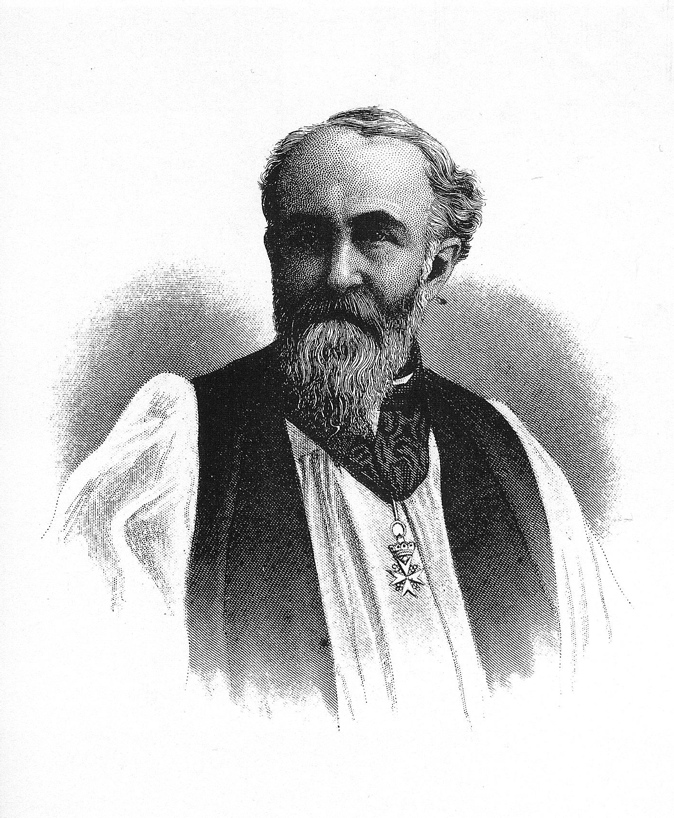
Charles Quintard, second Bishop of Tennessee, first Vice-Chancellor of the University of the South

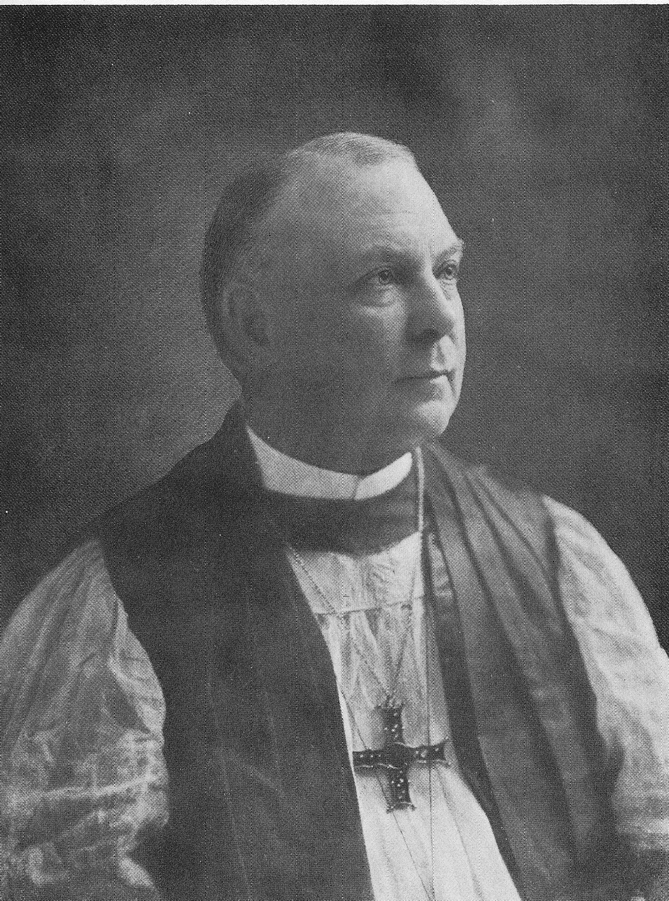
Thomas F. Gailor, third Bishop of Tennessee, President of the National Council of The Episcopal Church.

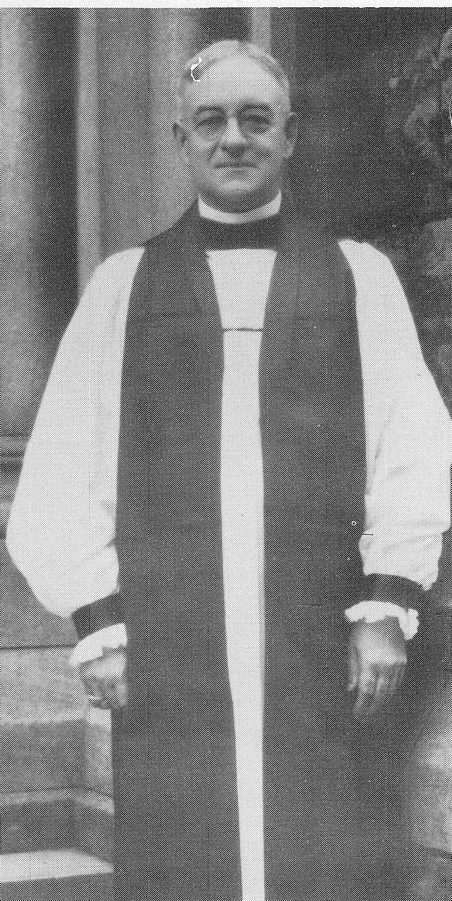
James Matthew Maxon, fourth Bishop of Tennessee

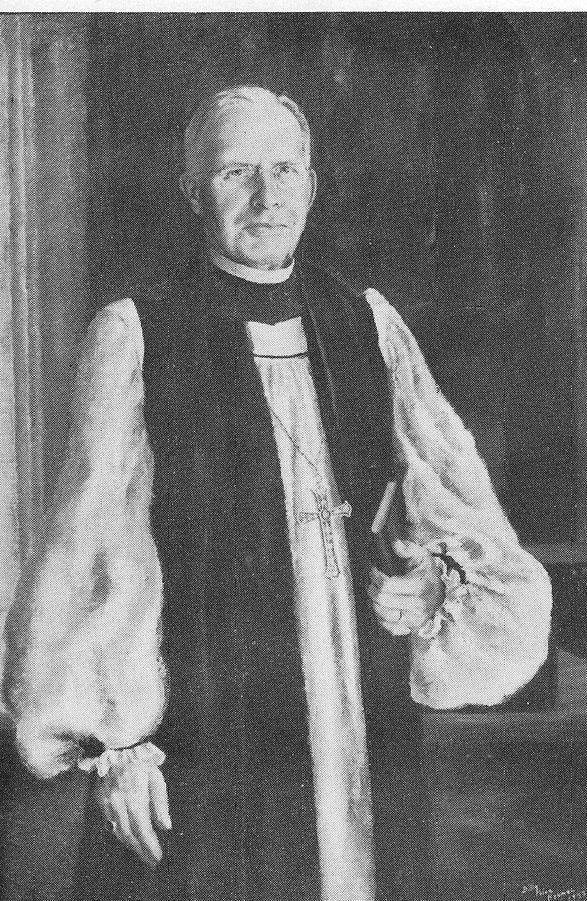
Edmund Dandridge, fifth Bishop of Tennessee

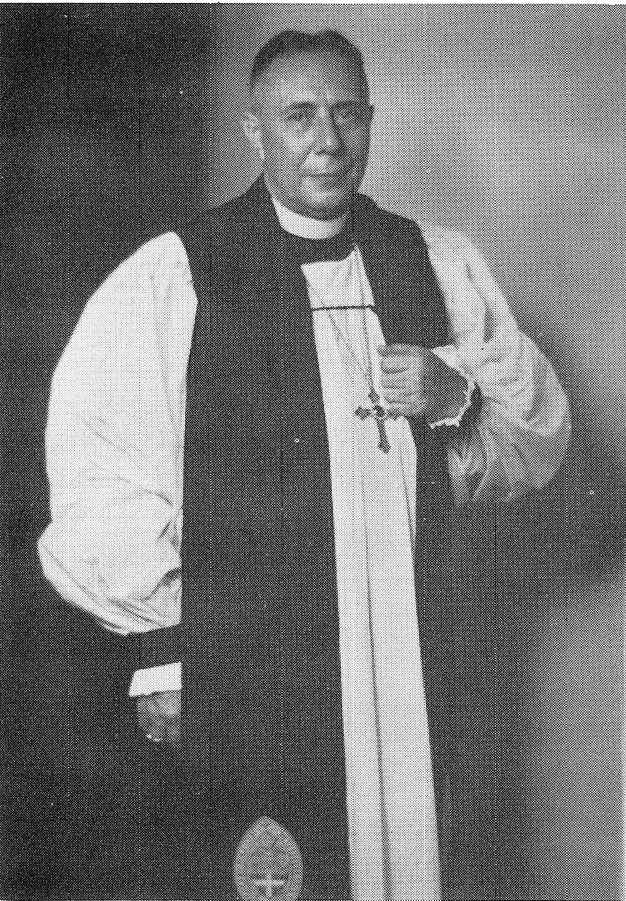
Theodore Barth, sixth Bishop of Tennessee

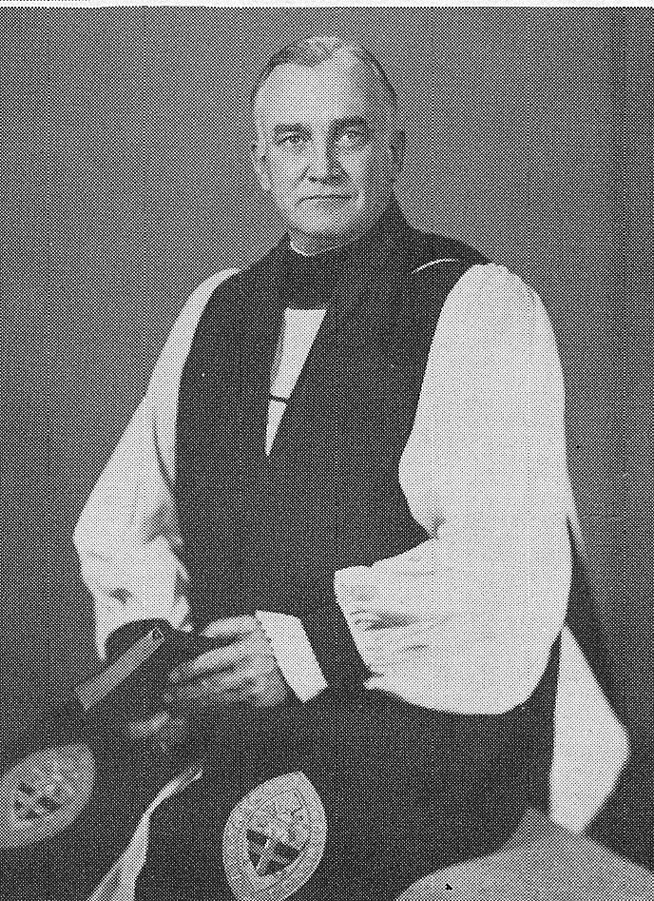
John Vander Horst, seventh Bishop of Tennessee

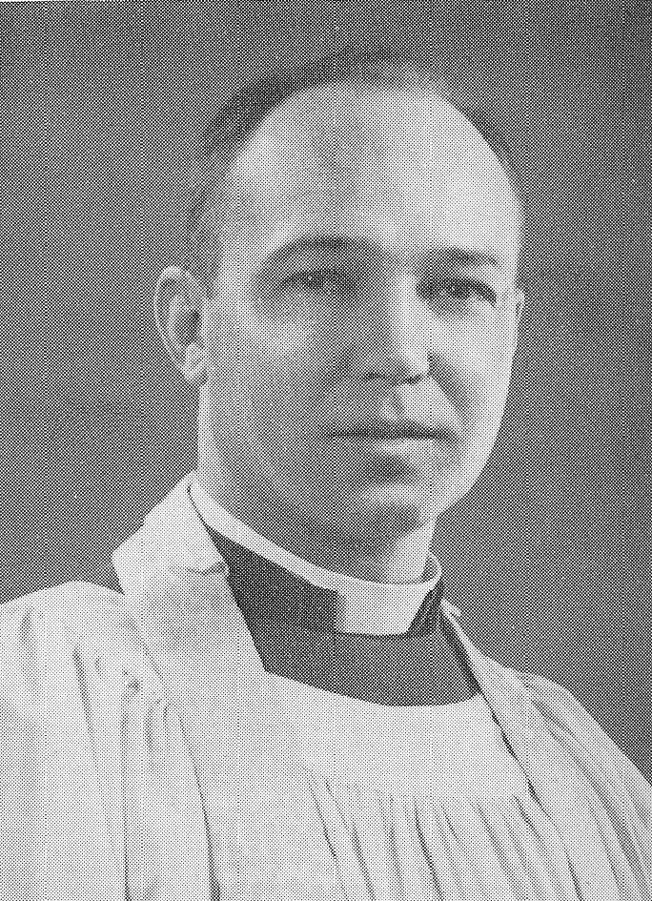
William Sanders, eighth Bishop of Tennessee; first Bishop of East Tennessee
