= Christ Episcopal Church (South Pittsburg, Tennessee) =

Historic church in Tennessee, United States

- Christ Episcopal Church and Parish House
- U.S. National Register of Historic Places
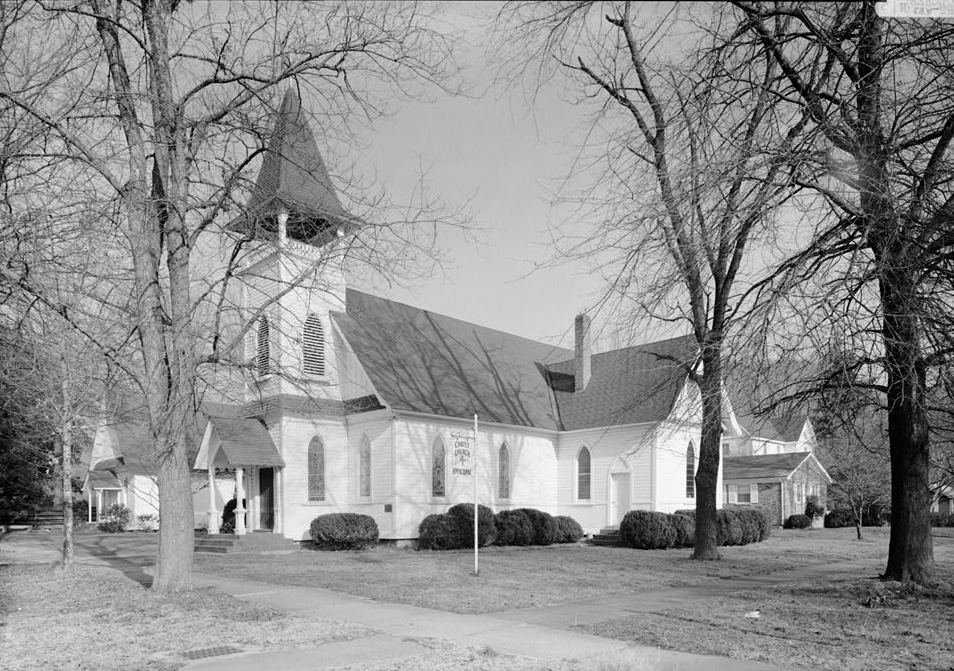
- Christ Episcopal Church in February 1983
- Location: 302 West 3rd Street at Holly Avenue; South Pittsburg, Tennessee
- Coordinates: 35°0′48″N 85°42′26″W
- Area: 1 acre (0.40 ha)
- Built: 1884 (church), ca. 1889 (parish hall)
- Architectural style: Gothic
- NRHP reference No.: 77001278
- Added to NRHP: August 22, 1977

Christ Episcopal Church is an Episcopal congregation in South Pittsburg, Tennessee, part of the Episcopal Diocese of East Tennessee. The church building and parish house, located at 302 West 3rd Street (at the corner of Holly Avenue), are listed on the National Register of Historic Places.

== History ==
The earliest members of the Christ Church congregation were foundry workers who had immigrated from England and were working in South Pittsburg for the Southern States Coal, Iron, and Land Company, which was based in London. They began meeting together for worship in 1876.

After the Southern States company donated land for a church, the congregation began construction of a new church building in 1882. Tennessee Episcopal Bishop Charles T. Quintard advised them on the building's design. He wrote that the new church should be "graceful and churchly," with a "good, deep, recessed channel," building dimensions "at least twice as long as ... wide," and a steeply pitched roof. He also advised that "emplaned weather boarding" was an appropriate material. The church building was completed in 1884. With support from Bishop Quintard and St. Paul's Episcopal Church in Chattanooga, Christ Church parish was formally established in May 1887. The following year a rectory was built, the bell tower was added to the church, and the church was consecrated by Bishop Quintard. The church's parish house was completed in about 1889. An addition in 1960 connected the parish house to the church.

The church and parish house were listed on the National Register of Historic Places in 1977.

== Description ==
Christ Church is an example of the Gothic Revival architectural style. Both the church and the parish house are single-story three-bay buildings. Consistent with Bishop Quintard's recommendation, at 27 by 57 feet (8 by 17 m) the church building is more than twice as long as it is wide. The church building and its interior decor, including a hand-carved altar and baptismal font, are built entirely from wood (except for a brick foundation). The square bell tower is two stories in height, has an open belfry, and is topped by a steep flared pyramidal roof. There are several stained glass windows, including a Tiffany Studios window installed in 1915. The church has a Moller organ that was installed in 1928.

In 1974, the Historic American Buildings Survey described Christ Church and its parish house as "among the few frame Gothic Revival buildings in the state of Tennessee." Together with buildings at Rugby, Tennessee, they were said to "exemplify the imaginative understanding of high style design associated with the Episcopal church in east Tennessee in the Victorian era."

== Clergy ==
As of 2014, the rector is the Rev. Kim Merritt Hobby. The Rev. Gary England is the deacon assigned to Christ Church by the Rt. Rev. George Young, Bishop of East Tennessee.
