= John C. Bauerschmidt =

American prelate

The Right Reverend John C. Bauerschmidt Ph.D.
- Bishop of Tennessee
- Church: Episcopal Church
- Diocese: Tennessee
- Elected: October 28, 2006
- In office: 2007–present
- Predecessor: Bertram Herlong

Orders
- Ordination: June 1, 1985 by William A. Beckham
- Consecration: January 27, 2007 by Clifton Daniel

Personal details
- Born: 1959 (age 66–67) Portsmouth, Virginia, United States
- Denomination: Anglican
- Spouse: Caroline Barnard Pearce
- Children: 3

John Crawford Bauerschmidt (born 1959) is an American prelate of the Episcopal Church who is the eleventh Bishop of Tennessee.

== Biography ==
After studies at the General Theological Seminary of the Episcopal Church, he was ordained to the diaconate on June 9, 1984, and to the priesthood on June 1, 1985.

In 1987 Bauerschmidt matriculated at Oxford University, England, from which he received the D.Phil. degree in 1996. From 1987 until 1991 he and his family were resident in England; his doctoral work was supervised by the Rev. Canon Oliver O’Donovan, the Regius Professor of Moral and Pastoral Theology. His doctoral thesis was titled Sexual Difference and the Relationship of the Sexes in the Theology of St. Augustine.

He was consecrated as bishop of Tennessee on January 27, 2007, after an unusually lengthy election process, requiring several sessions to complete. He came to the Tennessee diocese during a particularly tumultuous period in its history, with strong polarization between conservative and liberal factions instigated partly by his predecessor, a strong advocate for conservative Anglicanism who started several missions (mainly in the Nashville metropolitan area) with a sharply Low Church or Evangelical bent, most of which were opposed to then-current theological and ethical trends in the larger Episcopal Church. Bauerschmidt, considered a moderate by those standards, helped reduce significantly some of the tensions besetting the diocese, aided in part by the withdrawal of the more staunchly conservative individuals (and some churches) to either the Continuing Anglican or Anglican realignment movements in the late 2000s and early 2010s. In fact, one of the defecting churches, St. Andrew's in Nashville, an Anglo-Catholic parish since its 1960s relocation from a then-declining part of West Nashville to the affluent Green Hills neighborhood, was forced by the Tennessee Supreme Court to cede its property to the diocese in late 2012, and the following year, Bauerschmidt had the diocesan offices moved there, after 28 years in rented locations elsewhere in Nashville.

He is currently a member of Communion Partners, an Episcopal group which opposed the 77th General Convention's decision to authorize the blessing of same-sex marriages in 2012. The measure to allow the blessing of same-sex unions won by a 111–41 vote with 3 abstentions.

Bauerschmidt has served as chair of the board of The Living Church and serves as a trustee of The Anglican Digest. Both are theologically conservative-leaning independent publications serving an Episcopalian readership.

On June 30, 2025, Bauerschmidt announced his intention to resign as Bishop of Tennessee on January 1, 2027. His successor, The Rev. Colin Ambrose of St. George's Episcopal Church in Nashville, TN, was elected to be 12th Bishop of the Diocese of Tennessee on October 24th, 2026.

== See also ==
- List of Episcopal bishops of the United States
- Historical list of the Episcopal bishops of the United States
