= Meridian, Georgia =

- Unincorporated community
- Location within Georgia Location within the United States
- Coordinates: 31°27′07″N 81°22′40″W
- Country: United States
- State: Georgia
- County: McIntosh
- Elevation: 16 ft (4.9 m)
- Time zone: UTC-5 (Eastern (EST))
  - Summer (DST): UTC-4 (EDT)
- ZIP code: 31319
- Area code: 912
- GNIS feature ID: 318042

Meridian is an unincorporated community in McIntosh County, Georgia, United States. The community is located along Georgia State Route 99, 6.5 miles (10.5 km) north-northeast of Darien. Meridian has a post office with ZIP code 31319.
