= St. Peter's Episcopal Church (Columbia, Tennessee) =

Historic church in Tennessee, United States

- U.S. National Register of Historic Places
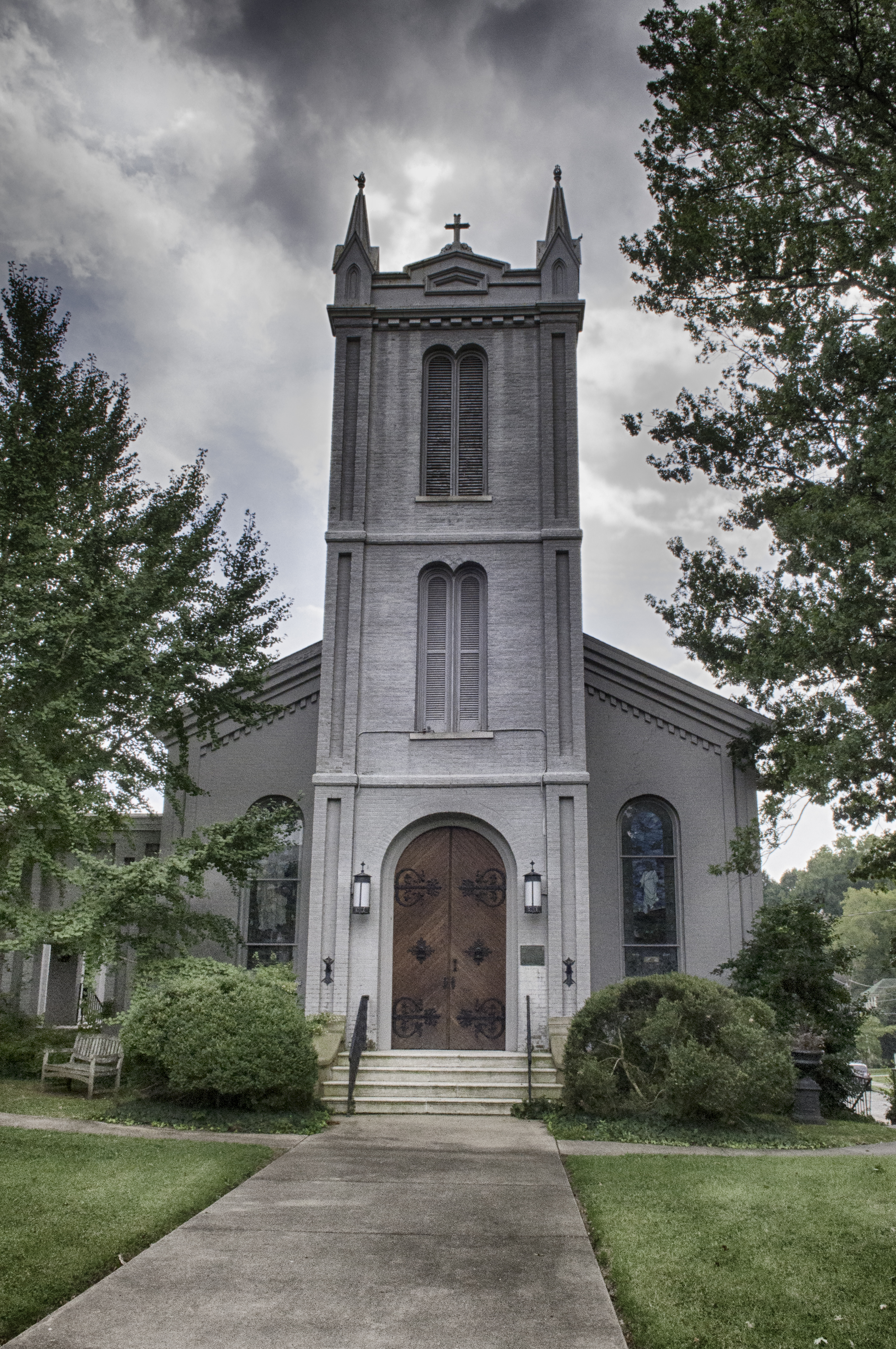

- Location within Tennessee Location within the United States
- Location: 311 W. 7th St., Columbia, Tennessee
- Coordinates: 35°36′52″N 87°2′18″W
- Area: 0.7 acres (0.28 ha)
- Built: 1860
- Architect: Akeroyd, H.M.
- Architectural style: Gothic, Romanesque
- NRHP reference No.: 79002448
- Added to NRHP: June 27, 1979

St. Peter's Episcopal Church is a historic church located at 311 W. 7th Street in Columbia, Tennessee.

It was built in 1860 and added to the National Register of Historic Places in 1979.

St. Peter's is a parish of the Episcopal Diocese of Tennessee.

St. Peter's was the second Episcopal Church established in Tennessee, being formally organized on June 16, 1828, one year before the Diocese itself was formed. The first church building was located on Garden Street.

The present edifice, begun in 1860, was not completed until 1871, after the Civil War. In 1926 the church interior was renovated to appear as it does today, with the enlarged split chancel, rood beam, and the carved lectern and pulpit. The parish house was erected in 1924. Additional classrooms and offices were added in 1964. St. Peter's was placed on the National Register of Historic Places in 1979.

Six former rectors have served the Church as bishops: James Hervey Otey, Bishop of Tennessee; Leonidas Polk, Bishop of Louisiana; Thomas Carruthers, Bishop of South Carolina; Fred Gates, Suffragan Bishop of West Tennessee; Frank Allan, Bishop of Atlanta; and Robert Tharp, Bishop of East Tennessee.

St. Peter's cares for, and uses, St. John's, Ashwood, a former plantation parish in rural Maury County, for its annual Whitsunday (Pentecost Sunday) service, as well as various other occasions. The church cemetery contains the remains of several bishops of Tennessee.
