= Edmund P. Dandridge =

American bishop

The Right Reverend Edmund Pendleton Dandridge D.D.
- Bishop of Tennessee
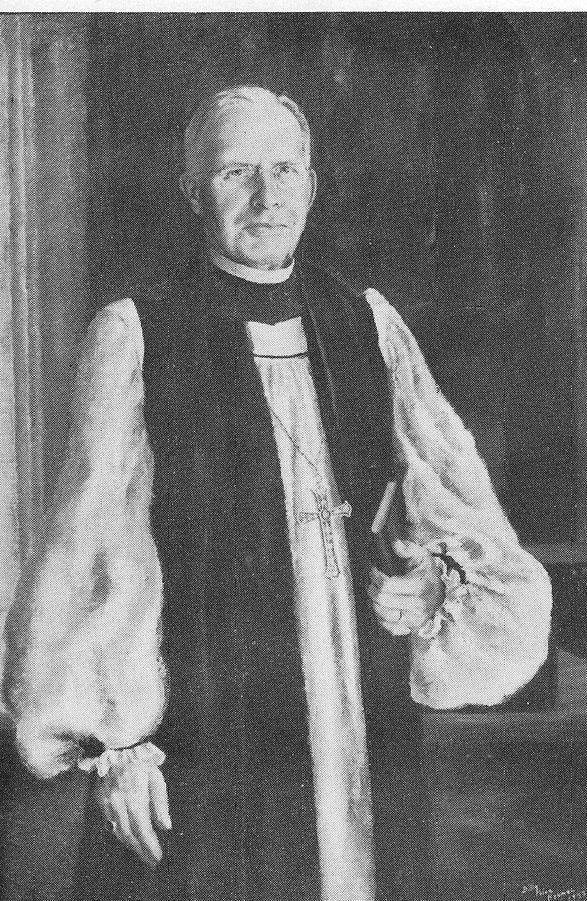
- Church: Episcopal Church
- Diocese: Tennessee
- In office: 1947–1953
- Predecessor: James M. Maxon
- Successor: Theodore N. Barth
- Previous post: Coadjutor Bishop of Tennessee (1938-1947)

Orders
- Ordination: December 1908 by George William Peterkin
- Consecration: September 20, 1938 by Henry St. George Tucker

Personal details
- Born: September 5, 1881 Flushing, Queens, New York, United States
- Died: January 28, 1961 (aged 79) Lexington, Kentucky, United States
- Buried: Norborne Parish Cemetery, Martinsburg, West Virginia
- Denomination: Anglican
- Parents: Lemuel Purnell Dandridge & Isabelle Lawrence
- Spouse: Mary Robertson Lloyd (m. Oct. 6, 1909)
- Children: 2

Edmund Pendleton Dandridge (September 5, 1881 – January 28, 1961) was fifth bishop of the Episcopal Diocese of Tennessee, serving from 1947 to 1953.

== Biography ==
Dandridge was born on September 5, 1881, in Flushing, Queens, New York, the son of Lemuel Purnell Dandridge and Isabelle Lawrence. He was ordained deacon in June 1906 by William Loyall Gravatt, Coadjutor Bishop of West Virginia and priest in December 1908 by George William Peterkin, Bishop of West Virginia. He served as rector of Christ Church in Nashville, Tennessee. On April 20, 1938, he was elected Coadjutor Bishop of Tennessee and was consecrated on September 20, 1938, by Presiding Bishop Henry St. George Tucker. He succeeded as Bishop of Tennessee on January 5, 1947. He retired from his episcopate on September 20, 1953. On February 6, 1953, he was appointed Dean of the School of Theology and the University of the South, Sewanee. He served as Dean for three years. The East Window of St. Luke's Chapel, Sewanee, was dedicated in his honor on June 6, 1957.

He married Mary Robertson Lloyd on October 6, 1909. He died on January 28, 1961.

During Dandridge's tenure as diocesan bishop, the diocese grew at a far larger rate than perhaps in any prior period in its history, mainly due to suburban development in the four major cities of the state and the missions and parishes erected to serve them. Growth proceeded to the point that, by the 1980s, the statewide body had been divided into three dioceses, one for each major region of Tennessee.
