= Thomas F. Gailor =

American bishop

The Right Reverend Thomas Frank Gailor
- Bishop of Tennessee
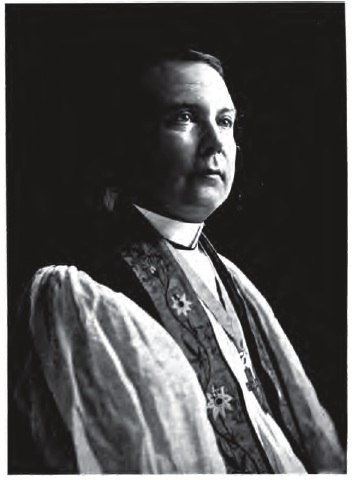
- Bishop Thomas F. Gailor, c. 1904
- Church: Episcopal Church
- Diocese: Tennessee
- In office: 1898–1935
- Predecessor: Charles Todd Quintard
- Successor: James M. Maxon
- Previous post: Assistant Bishop of Tennessee (1893-1898)

Orders
- Ordination: September 17, 1880 by Charles Todd Quintard
- Consecration: July 25, 1893 by Charles Todd Quintard

Personal details
- Born: September 17, 1856 Jackson, Mississippi, United States
- Died: October 3, 1935 (aged 79) Sewanee, Tennessee, United States
- Buried: University of the South
- Denomination: Anglican
- Parents: Frank Marion Gailor & Charlotte Moffett
- Spouse: Ellen Douglas Cunningham
- Children: 4

Thomas Frank Gailor (September 17, 1856 – October 3, 1935) was the third Bishop of the Episcopal Diocese of Tennessee in the Episcopal Church and served from 1898 to 1935.

== Early years ==
Thomas Gailor was born in Jackson, Mississippi. He was the son of Frank Marion Gailor and Charlotte Moffett. Gailor studied in the secondary school affiliated with Racine College in Wisconsin, and then earned his Bachelor of Arts from the college.

The Episcopal Bishop of Tennessee Charles Todd Quintard was an ardent supporter of Racine College and its Rector, the Reverend James DeKoven (1831-1879). Racine was modeled on both the College and Grammar School of Saint James in Hagerstown, Maryland (founded 1842) and St. Peter's College, Radley, UK (founded 1847). Both had reputations as outstanding schools.

After Gailor graduated from Racine College in 1876, he studied at the General Theological Seminary in New York, where he received a S.T.B. degree in 1879. He also earned a M.A. from Racine the same year. Gailor was ordained as a deacon in the Episcopal Church that spring and was ordained as a priest in 1880.

== Career ==
Gailor began his ministry as a deacon at Messiah Church in Pulaski, Tennessee. In 1882 he was appointed Professor of Ecclesiastical History and Polity at the University of the South in Sewanee, Tennessee. Gailor became Vice-Chancellor (President) at Sewanee, and later served as the eighth Chancellor of the University (June 23, 1908, until his death). In 1893, he was consecrated Assistant Bishop of Tennessee, and in 1898 he became the third Bishop. In 1916 Gailor was elected president of the House of Bishops, of the Episcopal Church and at the 1919 General Convention he was elected president of the National Council of the Episcopal Church. He served in this position until 1925, when the Episcopal Church's first elected presiding bishop began his six-year term.

In 1921 he received an honorary degree in Doctor of Laws from Oglethorpe University.

On June 25, 1924, he offered the invocation at the opening of the second day of the 1924 Democratic National Convention.

He died in Sewanee on October 3, 1935.

== Family ==
In 1923, his daughter, Ellen Douglas Gailor, married Richard Folsom Cleveland, son of former President Grover Cleveland.

== See also ==
- Episcopal Diocese of West Tennessee
- Episcopal Diocese of East Tennessee
- Succession of Bishops of The Episcopal Church (U.S.)
- St. Mary's Episcopal Cathedral in Memphis

== Sources ==
- "Thomas Frank Gailor," Tennessee Encyclopedia of History and Culture
- Bibliographic directory from Project Canterbury
- William Stevens Perry, "Thomas Frank Gailor," The Episcopate in America (Christian Literature Company, 1895), p. 357.
