= James M. Maxon =

American bishop

The Right Reverend James Matthew Maxon D.D., LL.D.
- Bishop of Tennessee
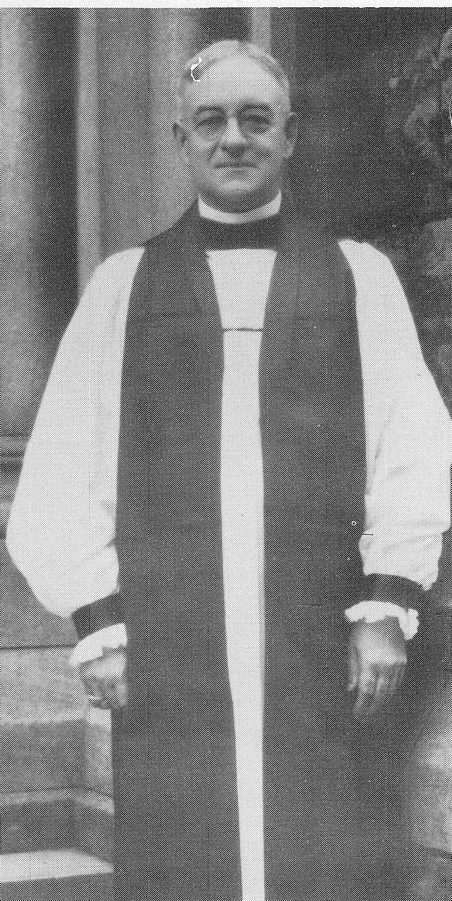
- Bishop Maxon, c. 1940
- Church: Episcopal Church
- Diocese: Tennessee
- In office: 1935–1947
- Predecessor: Thomas F. Gailor
- Successor: Edmund P. Dandridge
- Previous post: Coadjutor Bishop of Tennessee (1922-1935)

Orders
- Ordination: November 3, 1907 by M. Edward Fawcett
- Consecration: October 18, 1922 by Thomas F. Gailor

Personal details
- Born: January 1, 1875 Bay City, Michigan, United States
- Died: November 8, 1948 (aged 73) Memphis, Tennessee, United States
- Buried: St. John's Episcopal Church (Ashwood, Tennessee)
- Denomination: Anglican
- Parents: Daniel Marsh Maxon & Anna MacKenney
- Spouse: Blanch Morris (m. Oct. 10, 1903)
- Children: 2

James Matthew Maxon (January 1, 1875 – November 8, 1948) was the fourth bishop of the Episcopal Diocese of Tennessee, serving in that capacity from 1935 to January 1, 1947.

== Biography ==
Maxon was born on January 1, 1875, in Bay City, Michigan, the son of Daniel Marshman Maxson (1840-1915) and Anna McKinney. He was ordained deacon and priest in 1907. He was ordained priest by Bishop M. Edward Fawcett. He became rector of Christ Church in Nashville, Tennessee. He was elected Coadjutor Bishop of Tennessee on June 21, 1922, at a special convention of the diocese in Christ Church Nashville, Tennessee. He was consecrated on October 18, 1922, by Thomas F. Gailor, Bishop of Tennessee. He succeeded as Bishop of Tennessee in 1935 and was installed on November 3, 1935, in St. Mary's Episcopal Cathedral in Memphis, Tennessee. Bishop Maxon was instrumental in facilitating the merger of Grace Church and St. Luke's Church in Memphis, to form Grace-St. Luke's Episcopal Church in 1940. He resigned on January 1, 1947, and died on November 8, 1948, in Memphis, Tennessee.
