= Trinity Episcopal Church (Clarksville, Tennessee) =

Historic church in Tennessee, United States

- Trinity Church and Rectory
- U.S. National Register of Historic Places
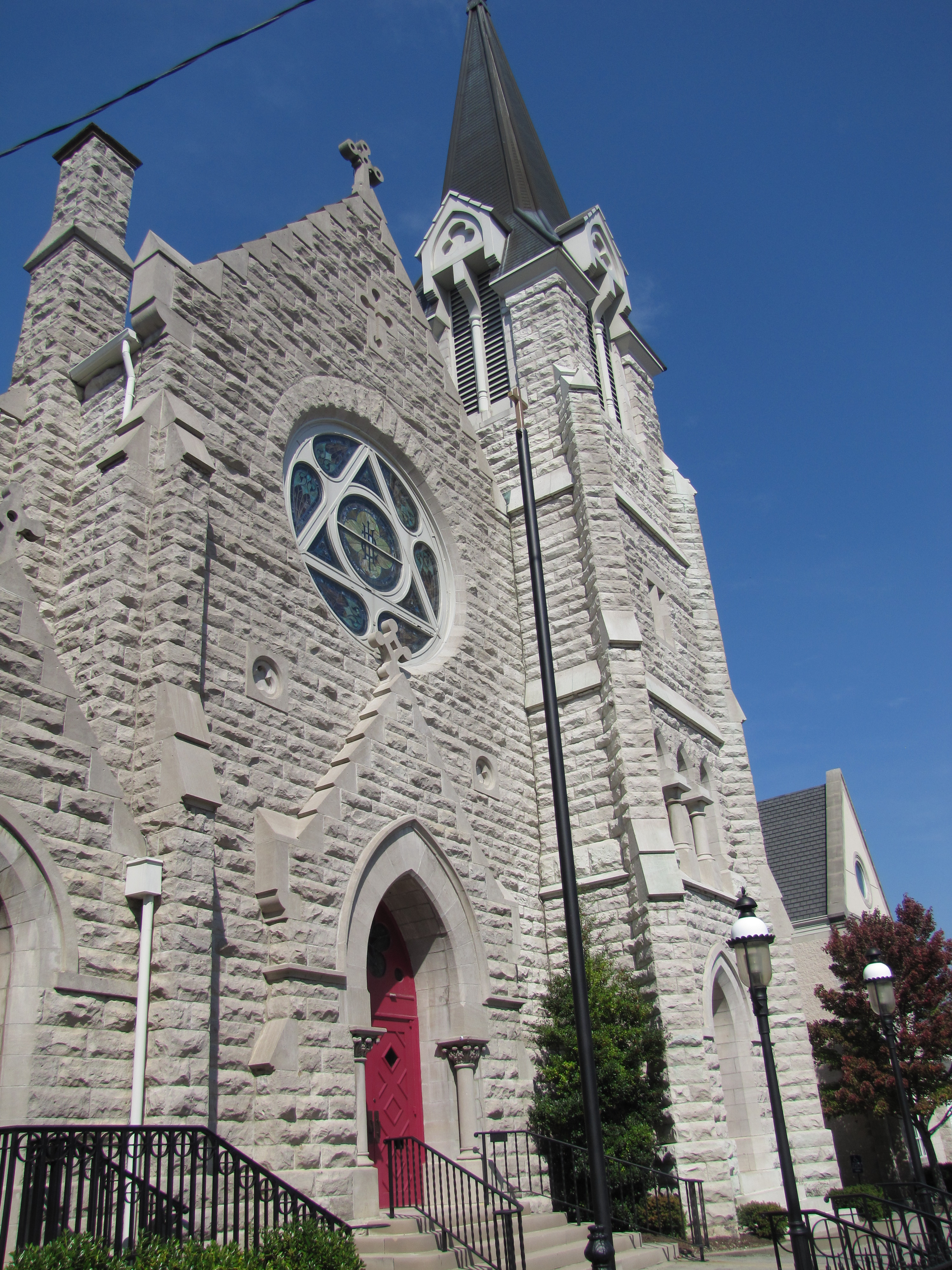
- Front of the church

- Location within Tennessee Location within the United States
- Location: 317 Franklin St., Clarksville, Tennessee
- Coordinates: 36°31′40″N 87°21′27″W
- Area: less than one acre
- Built: 1875
- Architect: Andrewartha, John; Conroy, John
- Architectural style: Gothic
- MPS: Nineteenth Century Churches in Clarksville TR
- NRHP reference No.: 82004035
- Added to NRHP: April 06, 1982

Trinity Episcopal Church is a historic church at 317 Franklin Street in Clarksville, Tennessee. The church and its rectory are listed on the National Register of Historic Places as Trinity Church and Rectory.

The Trinity Episcopal parish is one of the five oldest Episcopal parishes in Tennessee, established in 1832. Its first church building was completed in 1838. It was the second permanent church building in Clarksville, preceded only by a Methodist church built a few years earlier.

The church remained open through the Civil War, including the Union Army occupation of Clarksville. Its rector, the Rev'd Samuel Ringgold, convinced Union leaders to allow it to remain open, telling them that the value of "decent and orderly" worship should transcend both politics and war.

The original building was demolished in 1873 and replaced by the current Romanesque-style building, which was completed in 1877 and is faced with rough-cut gray stone. The rectory was built in 1883 and a parish house was added in 1916. Renovations in the 1920s and 1980s maintained the historic integrity of the original design.

Trinity Church and Rectory were added to the National Register in 1982. A tornado on January 22, 1999, destroyed the parish house, knocked over part of the steeple and severely damaged the church roof. Subsequently, the church building was restored and a new parish house was built.
