= Province 4 of the Episcopal Church =

U.S. ecclesiastical province

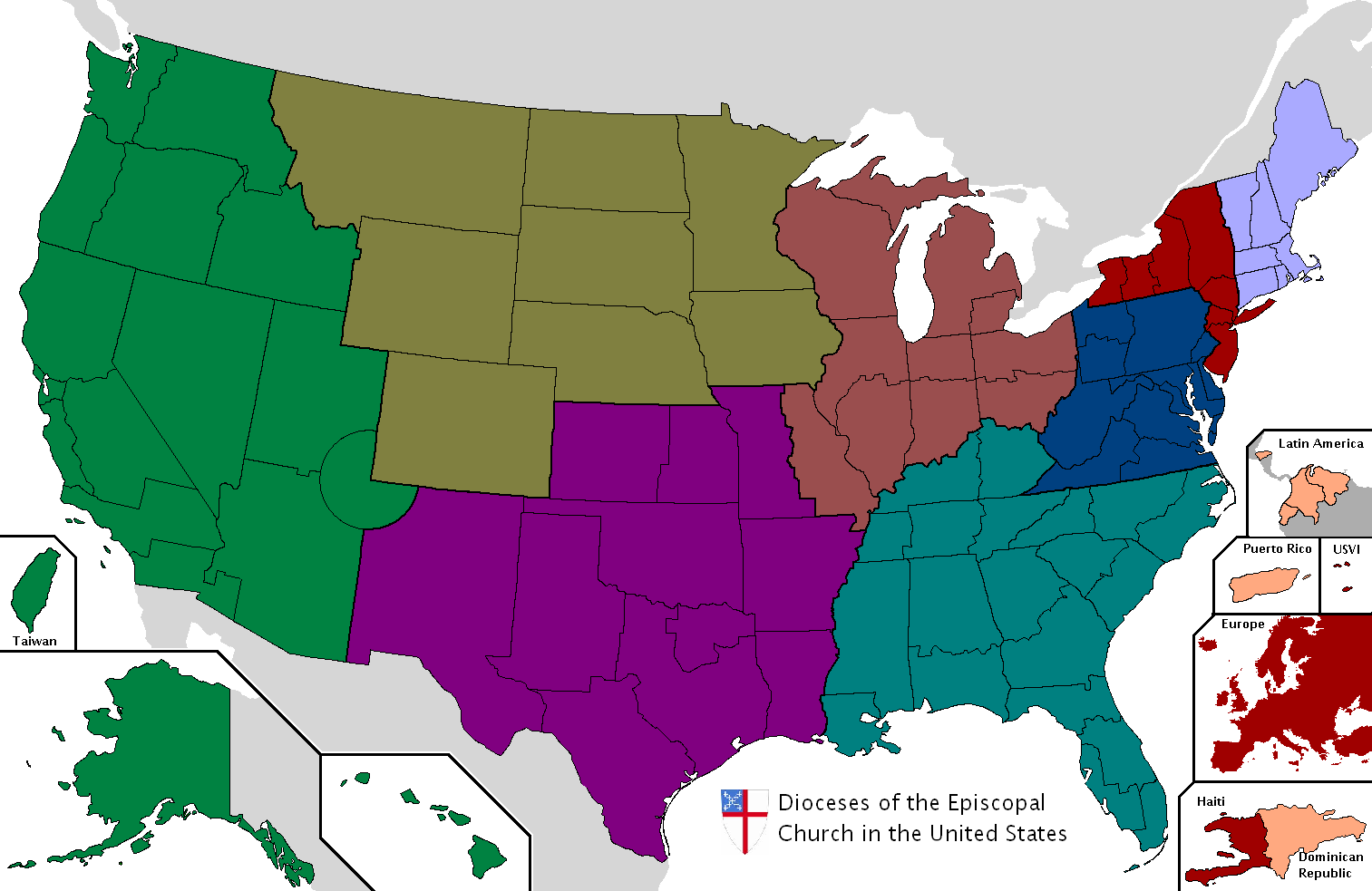
Province IV of the ECUSA

Province 4 (IV), also known as the Province of Sewanee, is one of nine ecclesiastical provinces making up the Episcopal Church in the United States of America. Being the largest of the provinces of the Episcopal Church, Province 4 is composed of twenty dioceses in nine states of the Southeastern United States. Included in Province 4 are dioceses located in Alabama, Florida, Georgia, Kentucky, Mississippi, North Carolina, South Carolina, Tennessee, and part of Louisiana. The Province has the largest number of clergy, baptized members, communicants, church school and day school pupils of any Province in the Episcopal Church. It is named for its seminary, the School of Theology of the University of the South, located in Sewanee, Tennessee. Angela Daniel of the Diocese of Upper South Carolina serves as President, and the Rt. Rev. Don Johnson of the Diocese of West Tennessee serves as Vice President.

Statistically, the province reported 434,351 members in 2015 and 372,412 members in 2023; no membership statistics were reported in 2024 national parochial reports. Plate and pledge income for the 1,240 filing congregations of the province in 2024 was $419,813,608. Average Sunday attendance (ASA) in 2024 was 105,033 persons. This was a decrease from ASA of 147,366 in 2015.

== Dioceses of Province IV ==
- Diocese of Alabama
- Diocese of Atlanta
- Diocese of Central Florida
- Diocese of the Central Gulf Coast
- Diocese of East Carolina
- Diocese of East Tennessee
- Diocese of Florida
- Diocese of Georgia
- Diocese of Kentucky
- Diocese of Lexington
- Diocese of Louisiana
- Diocese of Mississippi
- Diocese of North Carolina
- Episcopal Diocese of South Carolina
- Diocese of Southeast Florida
- Diocese of Southwest Florida
- Diocese of Tennessee
- Diocese of Upper South Carolina
- Diocese of West Tennessee
- Diocese of Western North Carolina

== References and external links ==
- ECUSA Province Directory (2010 archived version)
- Province IV website
