= St. John's Episcopal Church (Ashwood, Tennessee) =

Historic church in Tennessee, United States

- St John's Episcopal Church
- U.S. National Register of Historic Places
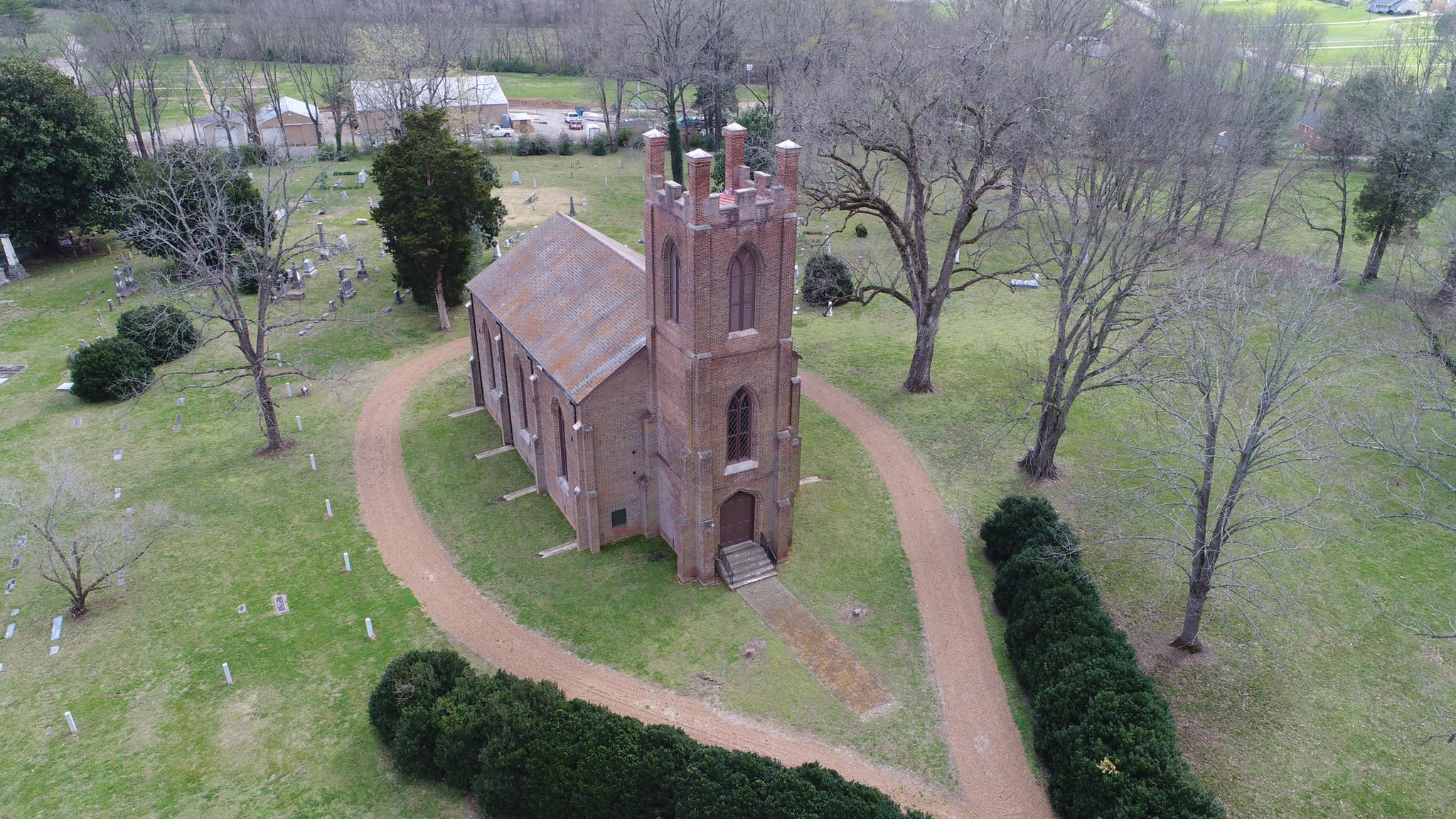
- Front of St. John's Church

- Location within Tennessee Location within the United States
- Nearest city: Columbia, Tennessee
- Coordinates: 35°34′27″N 87°8′20″W
- Built: 1839-1842
- Architect: Leonidas Polk
- Architectural style: Gothic Revival
- NRHP reference No.: 70000615
- Added to NRHP: July 8, 1970

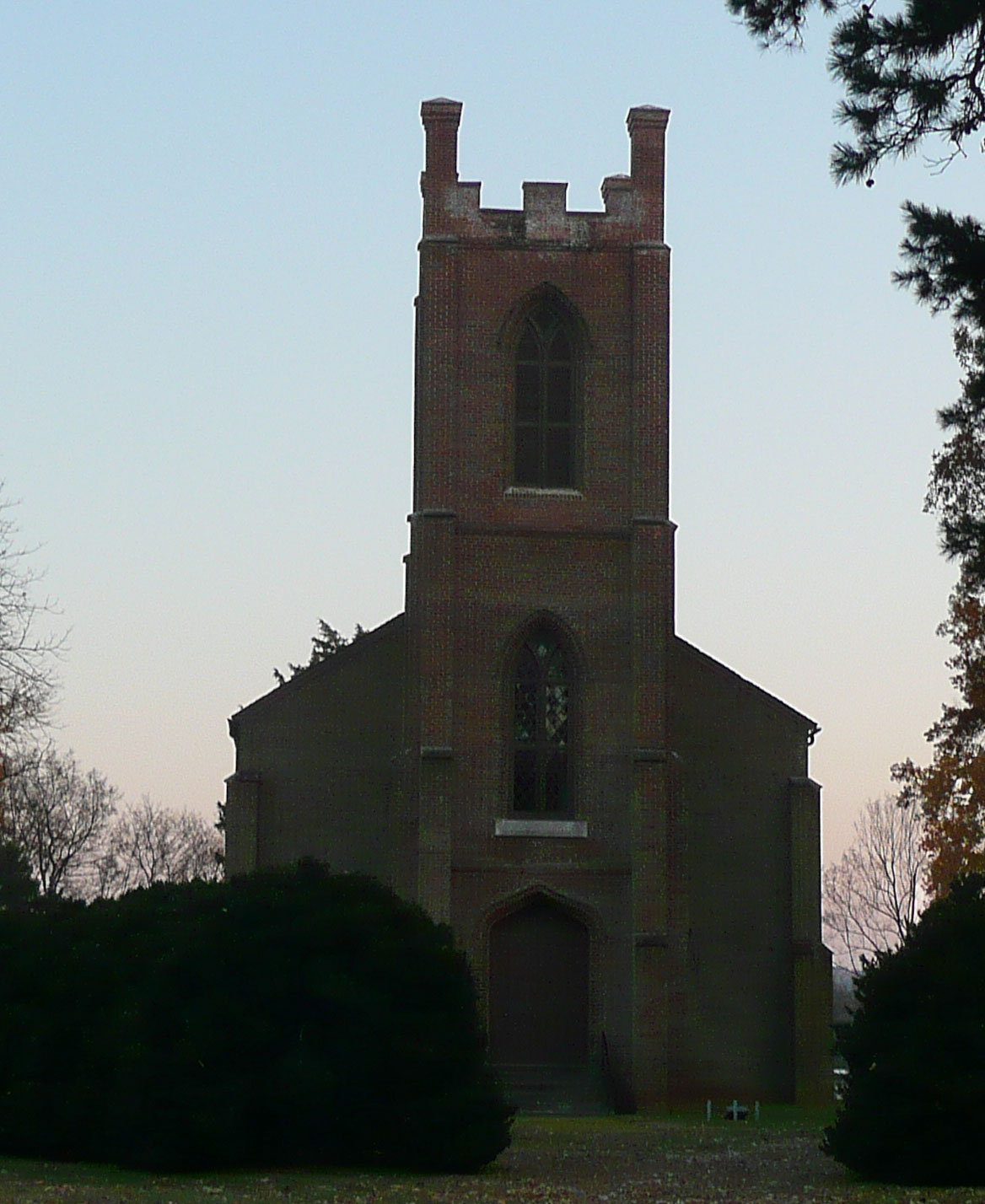
St. John's Episcopal Church (Columbia, TN)

St. John's Episcopal Church is a historic Episcopal church in Ashwood, Maury County, Tennessee, United States. Built from 1839 to 1842 by Bishop Leonidas Polk, it was an active church in the Antebellum South. It was ransacked and later used as a hospital for the Confederate States Army during the American Civil War of 1861–1865. Services resumed after the war, but they were discontinued due to low attendance in 1915. It is now closed, except for an annual pilgrimage.

== Location ==
The church is located six miles southwest of Columbia, Tennessee.

== History ==
The land belonged to Colonel William Polk. One of his sons, Leonidas Polk, served as the rector of St. John's Episcopal Church, which was based in his own house, Ashwood Hall, from January 1, 1834 to August 9, 1838. Due to poor health, he was assisted in his ministry by James Hervey Otey.

In 1839, Leonidas Polk decided to erect the church building. It was built where once stood a tall cherry tree, which was felled and used to make wood structures inside the churches such as the balcony or the reredos. The building was designed in the Gothic Revival architectural style. It was modelled after a church in Devon, England, as well as the Chapel of the Cross in Chapel Hill, North Carolina. Built by African slaves owned by Polk and his brothers, it was completed in the summer of 1842. It was consecrated on September 4, 1842.

The first permanent pastor, Stephen Patterson, was installed in July 1845. The congregation included both whites and blacks. A new rector, E. H. Cressy, was installed in 1848. The church bell was only placed in the tower as late as 1849. By 1858, James Hildebrand became the new rector. Mary Elizabeth Martin, Gideon Johnson Pillow's wife, and their son, attended services.

On March 31, 1862, in the midst of the American Civil War of 1861-1865, Union Brigadier General Don Carlos Buell broke into the church building and ransacked it, breaking the window glasses. By 1864, it was converted into a hospital for the Confederate States Army. Days before the Battle of Franklin of November 30, 1864, General Patrick Cleburne (1828–1864) was passing by St. John's and he remarked to his aides something like, "This is such a beautiful church that it would almost be worth dying so one could be buried here." Meanwhile, Leonidas Polk was buried in a crypt inside the church in 1864.

In 1872, Richard N. Newell, a former Roman Catholic from England, became the new rector. However, services were discontinued in 1915 due to low attendance.

In 1945, upon request from the Episcopal Diocese of Louisiana, Leonidas Polk's remains were taken from the church and he was re-buried at the Christ Church Cathedral in New Orleans, Louisiana.

No longer an operating church, it is only used once annually for services. The attached graveyard is the burial site of four Episcopal bishops of Tennessee.

== Heritage significance ==
It has been listed on the National Register of Historic Places since 1970.
