= Episcopal Diocese of South Carolina =

Episcopal Church diocese in the US

Diocese of South Carolina

Location
- Country: United States
- Ecclesiastical province: Province IV
- Headquarters: Charleston SC
- Coordinates: 32°47′12″N 79°56′24″W

Statistics
- Parishes: 40
- Congregations: 34 (2025)
- Members: 8,318 (2025)

Information
- Denomination: Episcopal Church
- Established: May 12, 1785
- Cathedral: Grace Church Cathedral

Current leadership
- Bishop: Ruth Woodliff-Stanley

Map
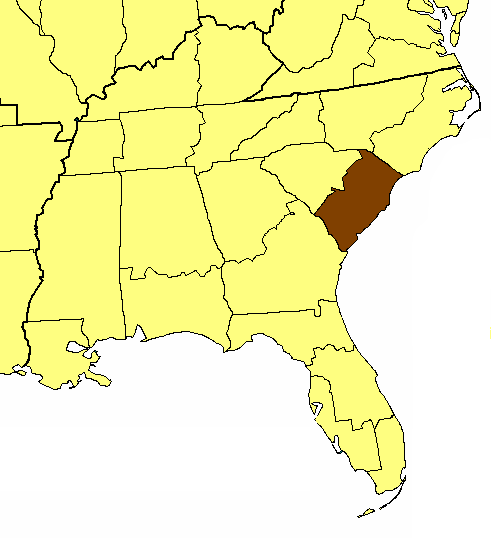
- Location of the Diocese of South Carolina

Website
- episcopalchurchsc.org

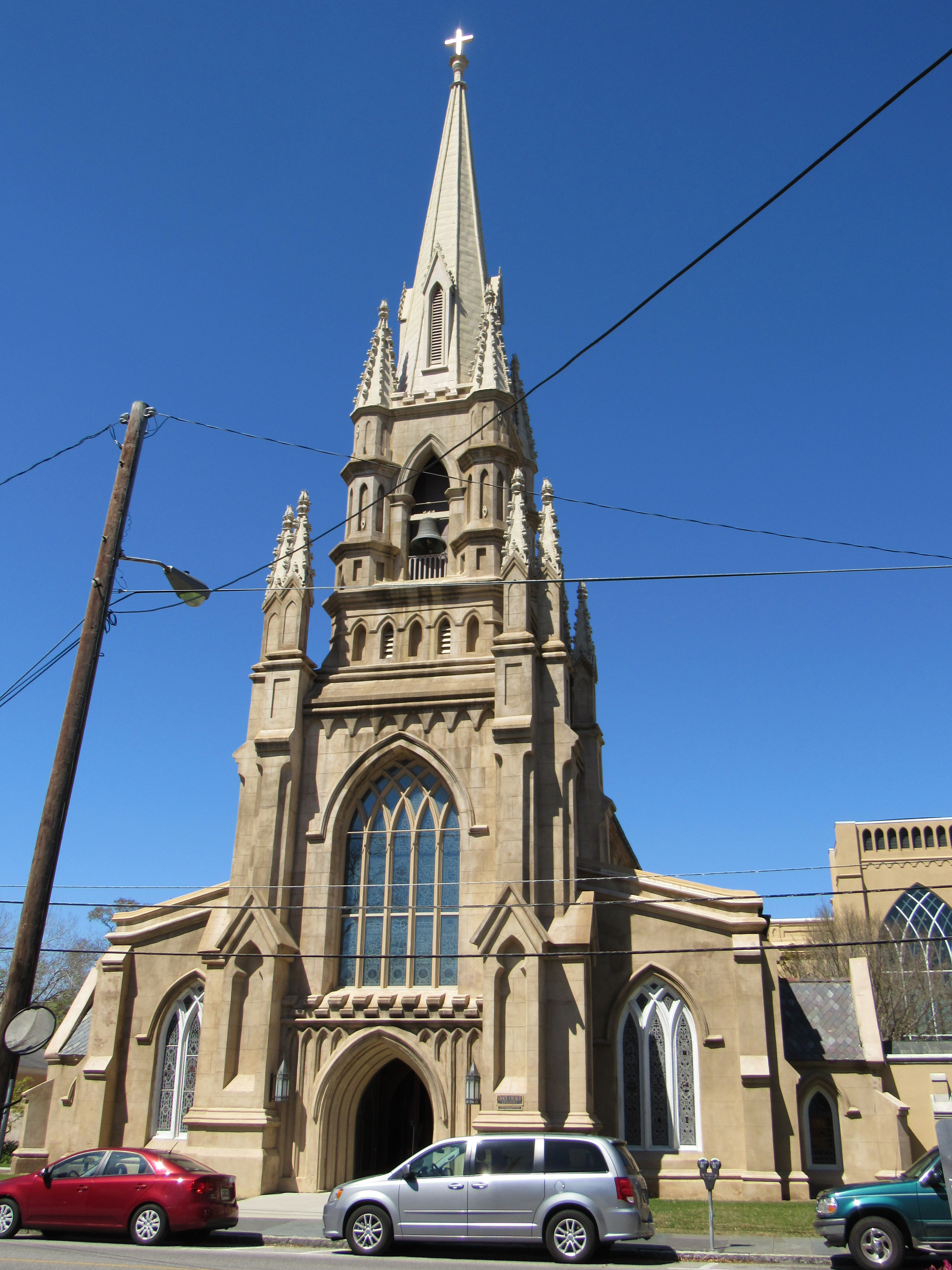
Grace Church Cathedral

The Episcopal Diocese of South Carolina (EDOSC), known as The Episcopal Church in South Carolina from January 2013 until September 2019, is a diocese of the Episcopal Church. The diocese covers an area of 24 counties in the eastern part of the U.S. state of South Carolina. The see city is Charleston, home to Grace Church Cathedral and the diocesan headquarters. The western portion of the state forms the Episcopal Diocese of Upper South Carolina. As a diocese of the Episcopal Church, the Diocese of South Carolina is part of the worldwide Anglican Communion and traces its heritage to the beginnings of Christianity.

In 2025, the diocese reported average Sunday attendance (ASA) of 2,497 persons. This was a relative decline from ASA of 2,910 reported in 2015. The most recent membership statistics (2025) showed 8,318 persons in 34 churches.

In a 2012 schism, Bishop Mark Lawrence and the majority of the leaders and parishes of the historical Diocese of South Carolina departed from the Episcopal Church. Lawrence's group considered their departure to be an official act of the diocese. The Episcopal Church disagreed, noting that its constitution and canons do not allow a diocese to unilaterally withdraw, and recognized the remaining parishes and individuals as its continuing diocese, under the new name "Episcopal Church in South Carolina". Charles G. vonRosenberg was installed as the new bishop provisional of the diocese in January 2013. Lawrence's group joined the Anglican Church in North America, and later became known as the Anglican Diocese of South Carolina (ADOSC).

Both parties claimed ownership of diocesan property, including not only church buildings but also the name "Episcopal Diocese of South Carolina", and related names and marks. These claims were the subject of protracted legal battles. On August 2, 2017, the South Carolina Supreme Court held in a split decision that twenty-nine of the parishes in the lawsuit and the St. Christopher Camp and Conference Center are the property of the Episcopal Church in South Carolina and must be returned, but that the seven remaining parish properties are owned by the Anglican Diocese of South Carolina. The South Carolina Supreme Court's decision did not answer the question of who owned the use of the name "Episcopal Diocese of South Carolina", and other associated marks. On September 19, 2019, a federal court awarded the names and intellectual property to the Episcopal Church and its South Carolina diocese. In 2022, a final ruling of the South Carolina Supreme Court awarded eight parish properties from the ADOSC to the EDOSC, and the two dioceses agreed to settle all remaining litigation over diocesan property, names and seals, with the EDOSC retaining the name, seal and most of the property.

As of 2021, the Episcopal Diocese of South Carolina is led by Ruth Woodliff-Stanley, who was consecrated as the 15th bishop of the diocese on October 2, 2021.

== History ==
=== Schism and lawsuits ===
During the years from 2000 to 2012, there were increasing tensions with the larger Episcopal Church as a whole. These tensions ultimately resulted in a September 18, 2012, finding by the Episcopal Church's House of Bishops Disciplinary Board that Lawrence had "violated his ordination vows to ‘conform to the doctrine, discipline, and worship of The Episcopal Church’ and to ‘guard the faith, unity, and discipline of the Church,’ as well as his duty to ‘well and faithfully perform the duties of [his] office in accordance with the Constitution and Canons of this Church.'" On October 15, 2012, Presiding Bishop Katharine Jefferts Schori notified Lawrence of this decision. She also notified him that he was not allowed to "perform any Episcopal, ministerial or canonical acts" until further action by the House of Bishops.

The Bishops Disciplinary Board cited three specific actions by Lawrence which, it stated, showed his abandonment of his ordination vows. First, his support at the 2010 diocesan convention for efforts to "qualify the diocese’s accession to the Constitution of the Church and to remove any provision acceding to the canons of the Church, as well as proposals to amend the diocesan Canons to remove all references to the canons of the Church." Second, a set of 2011 amendments to the South Carolina nonprofit corporate charter of the diocese, filed by Lawrence, "deleting all references to the [Episcopal] Church and obedience to its Constitution and canons." Third, in November 2011, the issuance of quitclaim deeds for the real estate of every diocesan parish, in violation of the Church's Dennis Canon.

According to Jim Lewis, the canon to the ordinary for the Diocese of South Carolina, the dispute was over Schori's increasing acceptance of relativism in the church.

With tensions growing between the diocese and the larger Episcopal Church, the diocese's standing committee had passed two corporate resolutions on October 2, 2012, designed to conditionally disaffiliate the diocese from the Episcopal Church and call for a special diocesan convention. These resolutions were to take effect if the larger church took disciplinary action against Bishop Lawrence or other diocesan leadership. On October 15, when Bishop Lawrence was notified of the Disciplinary Board's finding, diocesan leadership stated that the two resolutions were triggered. The special convention was held in Charleston at St. Philip's Church on November 17, 2012. The convention affirmed the disassociation of the Episcopal Diocese of South Carolina from the Episcopal Church, and amended the diocesan constitution and canons to remove all references to the Episcopal Church.

The Episcopal Church, however, disputed these actions, stating that under canon law an Episcopal diocese cannot withdraw itself from the larger Episcopal Church. In a "Pastoral Letter" to the diocese, Presiding Bishop Schori wrote that "While some leaders have expressed a desire to leave The Episcopal Church, the Diocese has not left. It cannot, by its own action. The alteration, dissolution, or departure of a diocese of The Episcopal Church requires the consent of General Convention, which has not been consulted." She further wrote that the South Carolina diocese "continues to be a constituent part of The Episcopal Church, even if a number of its leaders have departed. If it becomes fully evident that those former leaders have, indeed, fully severed their ties with The Episcopal Church, new leaders will be elected and installed by action of a Diocesan Convention recognized by the wider Episcopal Church, in accordance with our Constitution and Canons."

Lawsuits were filed over church property, names, and symbols; some of the legal disputes remain unresolved. Following the split, the Episcopal Church organized new leadership for its diocese of the remaining parishes, priests, and church members. That diocese adopted the name "Episcopal Church in South Carolina," since a temporary court order allowed the departing group to continue using the name "Episcopal Diocese of South Carolina." On January 26, 2013, a special convention of the Episcopal Church in South Carolina elected Charles G. vonRosenberg, retired Bishop of East Tennessee, as the new bishop provisional of the diocese.

On February 3, 2015, a South Carolina Circuit Court judge ruled that the breakaway diocese was entitled to the property and the historical name. The Episcopal Church appealed, and the South Carolina Supreme Court issued a complicated decision on August 2, 2017. Each of the five justices wrote separate opinions. Two justices would have returned all property in dispute to the Episcopal Church. Two justices would have upheld the 2015 ruling. The Dennis Canon (a 1979 Episcopal Church bylaw requiring parishes to keep property in trust for the national church) was an important element in the case. The court found that seven breakaway parishes never consented to the Dennis Canon and would be allowed to keep their property. The other 29 breakaway parishes were determined to belong to the Episcopal Church. The court split on the issue of who owned the name Diocese of South Carolina, leaving that portion of the 2015 decision in place.

First Circuit Judge Edgar W. Dickson was assigned to implement the 2017 decision. On June 19, 2020, he ruled that the 29 breakaway parishes could also keep their property, and the breakaway diocese, renamed Anglican Diocese of South Carolina, retained ownership of St. Christopher Camp. In his clarification of the multiple Supreme Court opinions, Dickson explained, "the Dennis Canon by itself does not create a legally cognizable trust, nor does it transfer title to property". The case was appealed, and the state Supreme Court issued its final ruling on April 20, 2022. It examined each of the 29 parishes individually to determine if they expressly agreed to the Dennis Canon. It found that 14 parishes did agree to the Dennis Canon and must return their property to the Episcopal Church. The other 15 parishes never agreed to Dennis Canon and keep their property. The court ruled that diocesan property belonged to the Episcopal Church.

A Federal court ruled on September 19, 2019, that the name and marks belong to the Episcopal Church and its South Carolina diocese. The court also ruled that, legally, "TECSC is the lawful successor of the Historic Diocese." The court noted also that it had been "settled by a majority of the South Carolina Supreme Court that TECSC is the lawful successor to the Historic Diocese." The Anglican diocese has announced plans to appeal this ruling.

=== Conclusion of litigation ===
Woodliff-Stanley and ADOSC Bishop Chip Edgar, who had been consecrated in 2022, began mediation to discuss a resolution to the disputes between the dioceses in spring 2022. On September 26, 2022, Edgar and Woodliff-Stanley jointly announced a settlement between the dioceses. While the settlement did not affect remaining issues regarding the property rights of three parishes still pending before the state Supreme Court or a betterments lawsuit by several parishes pending in state trial court, "it does resolve all remaining issues regarding diocesan properties." As part of the settlement, St. Christopher Camp and Conference Center on Seabrook Island was transferred from the ADOSC to the EDOSC on October 1, 2022. Under the settlement, the ADOSC also transferred the bishop's residence in Charleston, additional diocesan-owned real property in Charleston and Santee. The EDOSC waived claims to the ADOSC's leasehold interest in the diocesan headquarters. Historical papers in ADOSC possession will be made available for copying by both dioceses and then donated to the South Carolina Historical Society or another mutually agreed nonprofit; similarly, historical silver in ADOSC without a claim by a parish will be donated to the Charleston Museum or another mutually agreed nonprofit. Bishops' portraits in the possession of ADOSC will be copied and then transferred to EDOSC.

Both the ADOSC and the EDOSC agreed to provide quitclaim deeds to ADOSC church plants whose properties were not subject to orders in the litigation. They also agreed to dismiss pending litigation in federal court over diocesan names and seals, leaving the EDOSC as the owner of the historical name and seal. “From the very beginning of this process, I have been grateful for the gracious spirit of Bishop Edgar in doing just this work with us," Woodliff-Stanley commented. "While each diocese has had to leave things on the table to get to this moment, and while we experience pain over losses of some of the historic churches our members hold dear, even still, we have seen the Spirit at work in drawing us toward God’s redemptive way of love at every juncture.”

=== New cathedral ===
The Cathedral of St. Luke and St. Paul affiliated with the departing diocese in the schism, leaving the continuing Episcopal Church in South Carolina without a cathedral. In November 2015, the annual diocesan convention designated Grace Church in Charleston as the new diocesan cathedral, Grace Church Cathedral. The newly-chosen cathedral was selected to host the annual diocesan convention in November 2016. Episcopal Church Presiding Bishop Michael Curry visited the diocese in April 2016, and preached during a service at the new cathedral. Robert Willis, Dean of Canterbury Cathedral in England, was also in attendance to present a Canterbury cross and to celebrate "the newest cathedral in the Anglican Communion, which, I’ve already sensed throughout the services of this morning, is full of energy and vitality and all the sorts of things that the old Mother Church needs to encourage her life, too."

== Bishops ==
These are the bishops who have served the Diocese of South Carolina:

1. Robert Smith (1795–1801)
2. Theodore Dehon (1812–1817)
3. Nathaniel Bowen (1818–1839)
4. Christopher E. Gadsden (1840–1852)
5. Thomas F. Davis (1853–1871)
6. William B. W. Howe (1871–1894)
  * Ellison Capers, Coadjutor Bishop (consecrated 1893)
7. Ellison Capers (1894–1908)
  * William A. Guerry, Coadjutor Bishop (consecrated 1907)
8. William A. Guerry (1908–1928)
  * Kirkman George Finlay, Coadjutor Bishop (1921–1922)
9. Albert Sidney Thomas (1928–1944)
10. Thomas N. Carruthers, (1944–1960)
11. Gray Temple (1961–1982)
  * C. FitzSimons Allison, Coadjutor Bishop (consecrated 1980)
12. C. FitzSimons Allison, (1982–1990)
  * G. Edward Haynsworth, (Assistant, 1985–1990)
13. Edward L. Salmon, Jr. (1990–2008)
  * William J. Skilton, Suffragan Bishop (1996–2006)
14. Mark Lawrence (2008–2012)
  * Charles G. vonRosenberg (Provisional, 2013-2016)
  * Gladstone B. "Skip" Adams III (Provisional, 2016–2019)
15. Ruth Woodliff-Stanley (2021–present)

== See also ==
- Ecclesiastical provinces and dioceses of the Episcopal Church
- List of bishops of the Episcopal Church in the United States of America
- Anglican realignment
