= William J. Skilton =

American Anglican bishop (born 1940)

The Right Reverend William Jones Skilton D.D.
- Retired Suffragan Bishop of South Carolina
- Church: Anglican Church in North America
- Diocese: Anglican Diocese of South Carolina
- Elected: October 7, 1995
- In office: 1996–2006 (Episcopal Diocese of South Carolina)

Orders
- Ordination: January 23, 1966 by Gray Temple
- Consecration: March 2, 1996 by Edmond L. Browning

Personal details
- Born: August 16, 1940 (age 85) Havana, Cuba
- Denomination: Anglican
- Parents: William Edward Skilton & Blandina Springs Jones
- Spouse: DeborahTillman Causey (m. 2017 Lynda Dale Padgett m.1963 d. 2015)
- Children: 2

William Jones Skilton (born August 16, 1940) is an American Anglican bishop. He was the first suffragan bishop of the Episcopal Diocese of South Carolina.

== Biography ==
Skilton was born in Havana, Cuba. He arrived in the United States at the age of 16 and studied at The Citadel, from where he graduated in 1962. He also studied at the University of the South and graduated in theology in 1965. He was ordained deacon in 1965 and priest on January 23, 1966 in Old St. Andrew's Parish Church, Charleston, South Carolina. After ordination, he served as vicar of All Saints' Church in La Romana, Dominican Republic until 1972. He then became priest-in-charge of Holy Trinity and Cross Church in Bluffton, South Carolina and from 1973 and 1976, he also subsequently served as canon of the cathedral chapter of the Cathedral of St Luke and St Paul. In 1976, he became rector of Trinity Church in Charleston, South Carolina. In 1985, he returned to the Dominican Republic to serve as vicar of Epiphany Church, among other posts. From 1988 till 1996, he served as rector of St Thomas' Church in North Charleston, South Carolina.

He was elected Suffragan Bishop of South Carolina, the first to hold such a post, on October 7, 1995, on the fourth ballot. He was then consecrated on March 2, 1996 with Presiding Bishop Edmond L. Browning as chief consecrator, in the Cathedral of St Luke and St Paul. He retired on December 31, 2006. Later it was revealed that he was asked to resign by Standing Committee of the diocese, to make way for the election of Mark Lawrence as diocesan bishop. He was awarded an honorary Doctor of Divinity degree from The Citadel in 2006.

He resigned his orders at the Episcopal Church, on effect since 6 December 2020, due to his opposition to what he regards as the liberal theology of the church. He joined the Anglican Church in North America afterwards, being licensed to preach at the Anglican Diocese of South Carolina, starting in January 2021. He is currently a Retired Suffragan Bishop at the diocese.
