= List of original dioceses of the Episcopal Church (United States) =

The Episcopal Church in the United States of America currently has 111 dioceses. When the church was founded in 1785, it only had nine.

These were:

1. Episcopal Diocese of Massachusetts
2. Episcopal Diocese of Connecticut
3. Episcopal Diocese of Pennsylvania
4. Episcopal Diocese of Virginia
5. Episcopal Diocese of New York
6. Episcopal Diocese of Maryland
7. Episcopal Diocese of New Jersey
8. Episcopal Diocese of Delaware
9. Episcopal Diocese of South Carolina

They are represented by the nine white crosses arranged in a St. Andrew's Cross on a blue field (canton) on the Church arms and flag. The rest of the flag is a red St. George’s Cross on a white field reminiscent of the former national flag of the old Kingdom of England before the first Act of Union in 1706/1707 uniting England and Scotland.

In 2012, due to disputes over theology and authority, the standing committee of the Diocese of South Carolina voted to withdraw the entire diocese from The Episcopal Church in the U.S.A. and become an autonomous Anglican diocese, joining the Anglican Church in North America in June 2017. The Episcopal Church maintained that an Episcopal diocese cannot withdraw itself from the national church. There is therefore a dispute over which South Carolina diocese is the successor to the diocese that was one of the original nine. The South Carolina entity which currently operates as a still constituent part of the ECUSA used the name "Episcopal Church in South Carolina" until 2019; the diocese which withdrew is called the "Anglican Diocese of South Carolina".

== See also ==
- List of Episcopal bishops
