= Episcopal Diocese of South Carolina (1785–2012) =

Anglican diocese, 1785–2012

The Episcopal Diocese of South Carolina was established in 1785 as one of the nine original dioceses of the Episcopal Church in the United States. The diocese originally covered the entire state of South Carolina, but the western part of the state became the Episcopal Diocese of Upper South Carolina in 1922. In 2012, a controversy led to the existence of two rival dioceses, the Anglican Diocese of South Carolina and the Episcopal Diocese of South Carolina, each claiming to be the legitimate successor of the original diocese.

== Colonial origins (1660–1775) ==
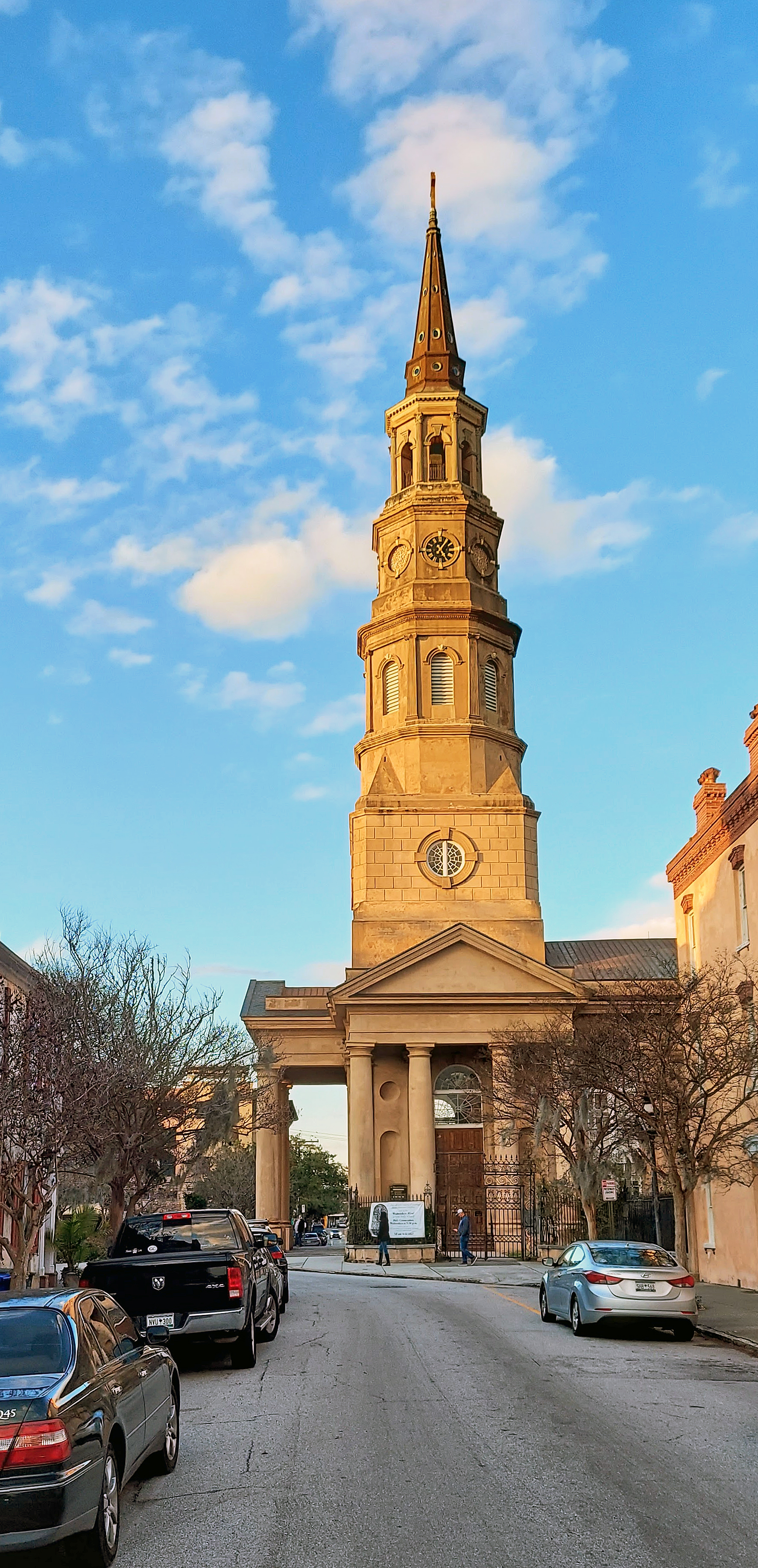
St. Philip's Church in Charleston is the oldest church in the diocese, established in 1680. The current building, completed in 1836, is the third building of the congregation; the previous buildings were completed in 1681 and 1723 respectively.

On April 19, 1660, a group from Virginia attempted to establish an English settlement at or near present-day Beaufort. Morgan Jones of the Church of England was chaplain and presided over the first Anglican services in South Carolina. The colony was unsuccessful and later abandoned.

In 1663, Charles II granted the Lords Proprietors the Province of Carolina and gave them "Power to build and found Churches, Chapels, and Oratories" for use according to the "Ecclesiastical Laws" of England. The first permanent settlement in South Carolina was at Charleston, founded in 1670. The city received its first cleric in 1680 with the arrival of Atkin Williamson, and South Carolina's first church, St. Philip's, was built in 1681. In 1702, the newly incorporated Society for the Propagation of the Gospel in Foreign Parts sent Samuel Thomas as its first missionary to South Carolina.

Religious toleration fostered by the Lords Proprietors made Carolina attractive to nonconformists. While the colony was dominated by immigrant planters from Barbados who tended to be Anglican, there were significant numbers of Presbyterians, Baptists, Quakers, and French Huguenots. At the start of the 18th century, religious harmony in Carolina began to break down as political factions began to coalesce along religious lines. The Barbadian planters disputed with the Proprietors over debts, land policies, and the Indian Trade. The Huguenots sided with the Anglicans, while the newly arrived dissenters gave their support to the Proprietors who had given them toleration. On May 6, 1704, Anglican governor Nathaniel Johnson called an emergency session of the General Assembly where a bill was introduced to require all members of that body to subscribe to the Test Act, effectively excluding non-Anglicans from the legislature. The Exclusion Act passed by one vote. In November, the General Assembly passed the Establishment Act, making the Church of England the state religion of the Province. Minister salaries and church construction were to be financed by an export and import tax, while local vestries were empowered to raise revenue by assessing the real and personal property of Anglicans and dissenters alike. The act gave the laity control over the church. Taxpaying parishioners were to select the rector and the vestry, which would manage the parish. A lay commission would exercise oversight over the church at large, with the power to remove clergy.

The 1704 acts were highly controversial, and dissenters lobbied the English government and public for their repeal. Daniel Defoe wrote a pamphlet, "Case of the Protestant Dissenters", that set out the argument of the nonconformists. They argued that the Exclusion Act was contrary to colonial precedent and the Carolina charter. On the Establishment Act, they argued that it violated the Church of England's episcopal polity by giving lay commissioners powers to discipline clergy. The House of Lords agreed, and Queen Anne declared the acts null and void. On November 30, 1706, the General Assembly repealed both acts. They were replaced by a new Establishment Act that eliminated the commission's ability to discipline clergy. However, parishioners still elected their clergy and the lay commission still administered elections and supervised the Church of England in Carolina. A 1710 amendment to the act abolished parish levies and instead provided that vestries could draw up to £40 annually from public funds to cover parish expenses. In this way, dissenters would not directly fund the Church of England.

In 1708, Gideon Johnston was sent by Henry Compton, Bishop of London, as the colony's first commissary. The commissary was the personal representative of the Bishop of London, who had nominal jurisdiction over the church in the colonies. His role was to supervise the clergy and the affairs of the church, and Johnston was a strong advocate of episcopal and clerical authority and adhering to official Anglican doctrine and form. The commissary's influence was limited, however, by lay power and loopholes in the Church Acts. The 1706 Act had taken from the lay commission the power to remove ministers without providing other means of removal. As a result, once a minister had been elected to a parish, a minister could not be removed for behavior. Theoretically, the commissary could revoke a problematic minister's license but not the minister's benefice or salary. Parishes ultimately resorted to paying troublesome ministers to resign. Johnston also attempted to conform the colonial church in all respects to the church in England. He found opposition not only from dissenters but from Anglicans who disliked episcopacy and embraced many of the religious outlooks of the nonconformists.

Concentrated in the lowcountry, with its center at Charleston, the colonial church's membership included the plantation gentry, the professional class, urban merchants, and skilled craftsmen. Most of the Huguenots who immigrated to the colony also converted to Anglicanism. This influence caused the clergy in South Carolina to be more Calvinist than the surrounding colonies. Outside of the lowcountry, however, the Church of England's presence was very weak, the interior being predominantly Presbyterian and Baptist.

== Creation and division (1775–1922) ==
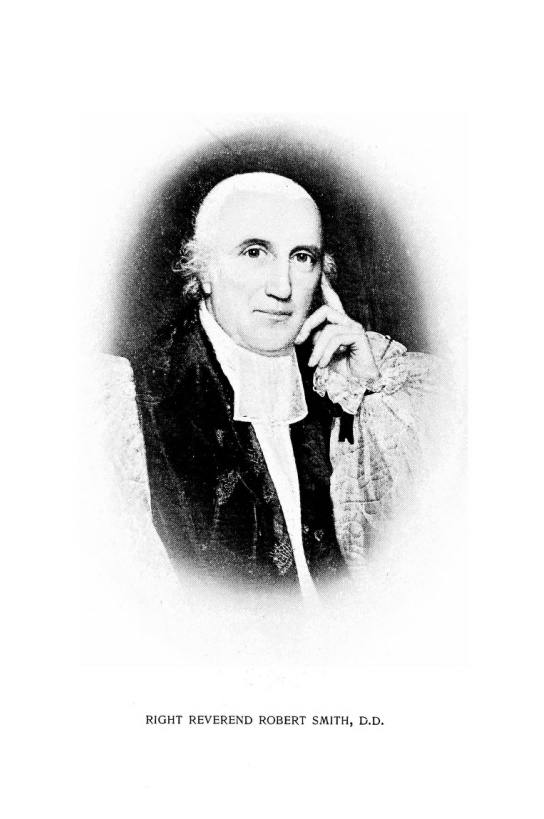
Robert Smith served as the first bishop of the diocese.

During the American Revolution, dissenters successfully advocated for the disestablishment of the Church of England and ensured that all Protestant religions were treated equally with the adoption of a state constitution in 1778 (equality was extended to Catholics and Jews in 1790). The first state convention of the Protestant Episcopal Church in South Carolina was held on May 12, 1785. In October 1790, South Carolina's state convention unanimously accepted the constitution and canons for the national church adopted by the General Convention at Philadelphia earlier in July 1789. Robert Smith was elected South Carolina's first bishop on February 10, 1795, at the 12th convention.

The Episcopal Church in South Carolina remained disorganized and stagnant during the immediate years after the Revolutionary War. The strong congregationalist tendencies held by the churches contributed to a lack of interest beyond local affairs. After 1798, no convention would meet until 1804. Bishop Smith had died in 1801 and there was no standing committee to examine candidates for holy orders. At the 1804 convention, a standing committee was appointed, and Edward Jenkins was elected bishop. Jenkins, however, declined the office. A lingering fear of tyrannical bishops would leave South Carolina without a bishop until 1812 when Theodore Dehon was elected. In 1810, the Protestant Episcopal Society for the Advancement of Christianity in South Carolina was created on the model of the Society for the Propagation of the Gospel.

During the American Civil War, the Diocese of South Carolina was briefly separated from the Episcopal Church in the United States and was part of the Protestant Episcopal Church in the Confederate States of America. In 1922, the Episcopal Diocese of Upper South Carolina was created from territory formerly part of the original diocese.

== Working towards racial equality (1923–1982) ==
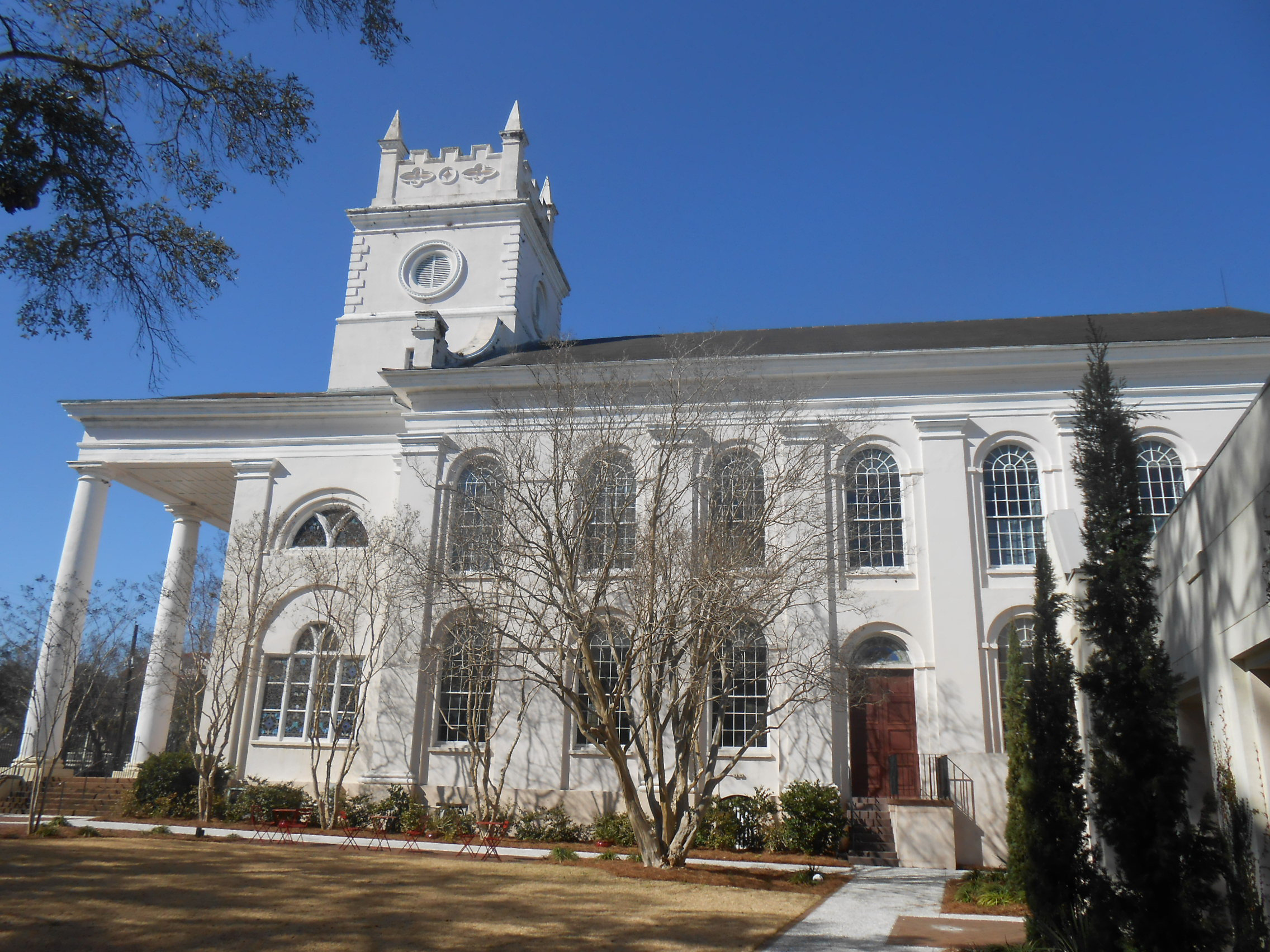
The Church of St. Luke and St. Paul became the episcopal seat in 1963.

William A. Guerry served as bishop from 1908 to 1928, and worked hard at promoting racial equality in South Carolina, even proposing having a black suffragan bishop. This provoked opposition, and he was murdered by one of his own priests, J. H. Woodward.

Racial segregation of churches ceased under Bishop Gray Temple (1961–1982), who also ordained black people as archdeacons.

== Move towards re-alignment (1983–2007) ==
C. FitzSimons Allison became bishop in 1983, and grew increasingly critical of the liberal tendencies inside the Episcopal Church. After a clash in the House of Bishops in 1990, he refused to share communion with other bishops. In 2000, Allison participated in the consecrations of Charles Murphy and John Rodgers, who were both priests in the Episcopal Church, as missionary bishops to the United States from the Anglican Church of Rwanda and the Church of the Province of South East Asia. Thus, the diocese began to be identified with Anglican realignment.

== Tensions with the Episcopal Church (2008–2012) ==
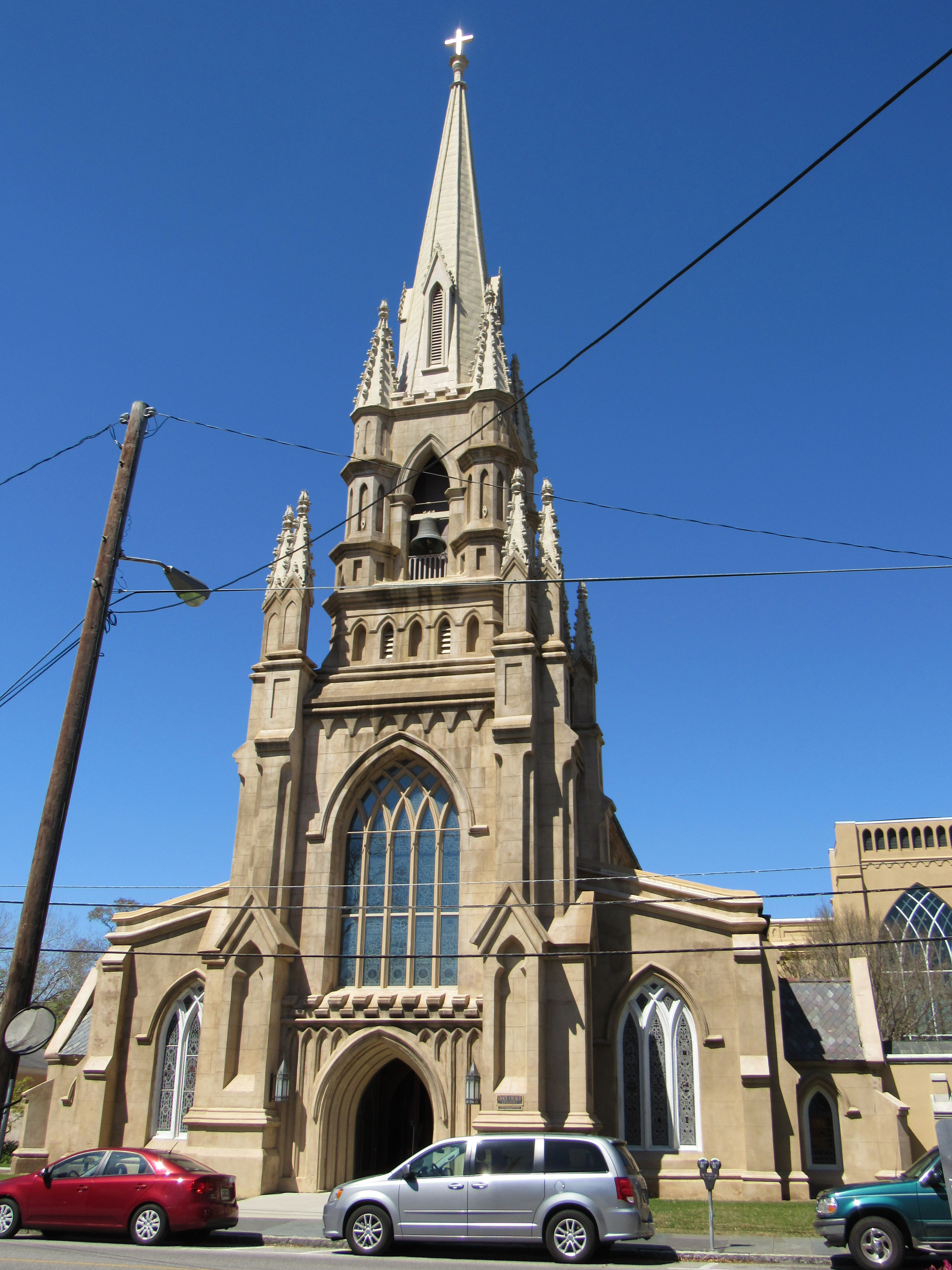
Grace Church in Charleston was selected to be the new diocesan cathedral of the Episcopal Church in South Carolina as its previous cathedral became affiliated with the Anglican Diocese.

From the 2000s until 2012 a large number of clergy and laypeople in the diocese became more and more dissatisfied with decisions made by the General Convention of the Episcopal Church, and increasingly supported realignment. Similar controversies occurred in four other Episcopal Church dioceses: San Joaquin, Fort Worth, Quincy, and Pittsburgh, each of which would also hold votes to leave the Episcopal Church. Since 2008, a number of developments heightened tensions between the diocese and the Episcopal Church.

Mark J. Lawrence was consecrated and installed as bishop on January 26, 2008, after being elected twice. The polity of the Episcopal Church requires that a majority of standing committees and diocesan bishops give consent to the election of any diocesan bishop. Because of "canonical deficiencies" in several dioceses' responses, the first election was declared void, requiring a second election.

The diocese opposed actions of the Episcopal Church that it viewed as contrary to scripture (see Homosexuality and Anglicanism). After the 76th General Convention of the Episcopal Church passed resolutions DO25 (opening "any ordained ministry" to individuals in same-sex relationships) and CO56 (concerning the blessing of same-sex relationships), the diocese responded by holding a special convention on October 24, 2009. The convention passed a resolution authorizing "the Bishop and Standing Committee to begin withdrawing from all bodies of the Episcopal Church that have assented to actions contrary to Holy Scripture, the doctrine, discipline and worship of Christ as this Church has received them ... until such bodies show a willingness to repent of such actions." It also declared "Resolutions DO25 and CO56, to be null and void, having no effect in this Diocese, and in violation of our diocesan canon."

The diocese attempted to distance itself further from the actions of General Convention in October 2010 and February 2011. At these consecutive diocesan conventions, accession clauses to the canons of the Episcopal Church were removed from the diocese's constitution. This was in response to revisions of Title IV, the canons of the Episcopal Church governing the ecclesiastical discipline of priests and bishops. The diocese claimed the revisions gave the Presiding Bishop of the Episcopal Church too much authority in internal diocesan affairs. While Lawrence stated that he did not intend to lead the diocese out of the Episcopal Church, 12 allegations made by an anonymous party charged that the bishop had "abandon[ed] the doctrine, discipline and worship of the Episcopal Church." Following an investigation in the fall of 2011, the Disciplinary Board for Bishops announced on November 28 that Lawrence's actions did not constitute abandonment.

In November 2011, the diocese generated more controversy when it issued quitclaim deeds to all parishes in the diocese, thereby surrendering any claim that it might have over parish property. Under the canons of the Episcopal Church, parish property is held in trust for the diocese and the Episcopal Church as a whole; however, South Carolina's diocesan chancellor defended the quitclaim deeds by citing a recent state Supreme Court ruling that the Episcopal Church's property canon was not binding on All Saints Parish in Pawleys Island. He also cited the fact that before 1979, the Episcopal Church never claimed ownership of parish property.

In the aftermath of the 2012 General Convention, which voted to allow the blessing of same-sex unions, there was speculation that the diocese was heading for secession. Bishop Lawrence was reported to have said that he personally "no longer sees a place for the diocese in the General Convention." In the fall of 2012, members of the historic diocese split into two rival factions. A majority of churches voted to leave the Episcopal Church and form the Anglican Diocese of South Carolina, a diocese of the Anglican Church in North America. The churches that voted to stay within the Episcopal Church as the "Episcopal Church in South Carolina" constitute the present Episcopal Diocese of South Carolina.

== Bishops ==
These are the bishops who served the South Carolina diocese up to 2012:

1. Robert Smith (1795–1801)
2. Theodore Dehon (1812–1817)
3. Nathaniel Bowen (1818–1839)
4. Christopher E. Gadsden (1840–1852)
5. Thomas F. Davis (1853–1871)
6. William B. W. Howe (1871–1894)
  * Ellison Capers, Coadjutor Bishop (consecrated 1893)
7. Ellison Capers (1894–1908)
  * William A. Guerry, Coadjutor Bishop (consecrated 1907)
8. William A. Guerry (1908–1928)
  * Kirkman George Finlay, Coadjutor Bishop (1921–1922)
9. Albert Sidney Thomas (1928–1944)
10. Thomas N. Carruthers, (1944–1960)
11. Gray Temple (1961–1982)
  * C. FitzSimons Allison, Coadjutor Bishop (consecrated 1980)
12. C. FitzSimons Allison, (1982–1990)
  * G. Edward Haynsworth, (Assistant, 1985–1990)
13. Edward L. Salmon, Jr. (1990–2008)
  * William J. Skilton, Suffragan Bishop (1996–2006)
14. Mark Lawrence (2008–2012)

== See also ==
- History of the Episcopal Church (United States)
