= William A. Guerry =

American bishop

The Right Reverend William Alexander Guerry D.D.
- Bishop of South Carolina
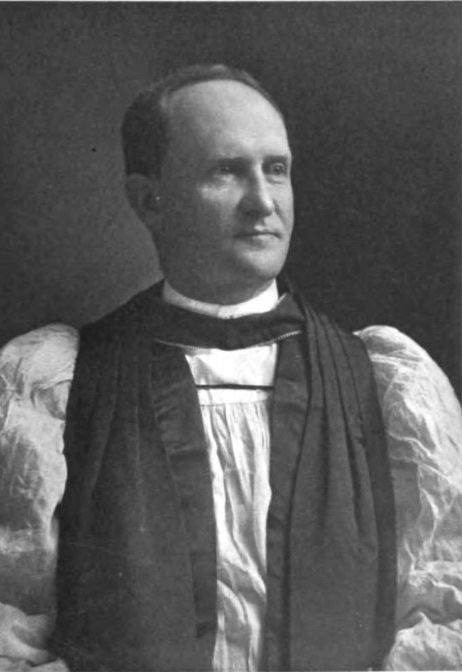
- Church: Episcopal Church
- Diocese: South Carolina
- Elected: 1907
- In office: 1908–1928
- Predecessor: Ellison Capers
- Successor: Albert Sidney Thomas
- Previous post: Coadjutor Bishop of South Carolina (1907-1908)

Orders
- Ordination: December 22, 1889 by Ellison Capers
- Consecration: September 15, 1907 by Daniel S. Tuttle

Personal details
- Born: July 7, 1861 Clarendon County, South Carolina, United States
- Died: June 9, 1928 (aged 66) Charleston, South Carolina, United States
- Buried: St. Philip's Episcopal Church (Charleston, South Carolina)
- Denomination: Anglican
- Parents: LeGrand Felder Guerry & Margaret Serena Brailsford
- Spouse: Anne McBee (1864-1943)
- Children: 5
- Education: Sewanee: The University of the South
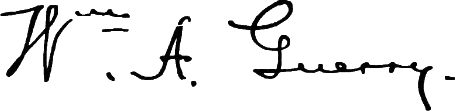
- Signature

William Alexander Guerry (July 7, 1861 – June 9, 1928) was an American prelate who served as the eighth Bishop of South Carolina.

== Early life and education ==
Guerry was born on July 7, 1861, in Clarendon County, South Carolina, the son of the Reverend LeGrand Felder Guerry (1836-1908) and Margaret Serena Brailsford. He studied at Sewanee: The University of the South where he earned his Bachelor of Arts in 1884, his Master of Arts in 1884, and his Bachelor of Divinity in 1891. He was a member of the Sigma Alpha Epsilon Fraternity (Tennessee Omega chapter) and served as the Eminent Grand Archon of the national organization.

== Ordained ministry ==
Guerry was ordained deacon on September 23, 1888, and priest on December 22, 1889, by Bishop Ellison Capers. In 1888, he was appointed rector of St John's Church in Florence, South Carolina, while in 1893 became chaplain of the University of the South, where he was also professor of homiletic and pastoral theology at the School of Theology. He was also involved in the construction of All Saints' Chapel in the university campus.

== Bishop ==
In 1907, Guerry was elected Coadjutor Bishop of South Carolina, and was consecrated on September 15, 1907, by Presiding Bishop Daniel S. Tuttle. He then became the eighth diocesan bishop of the Diocese of South Carolina on April 22, 1908. Guerry was made a Mason at Sight and was a member of Landmark Lodge No 76, A.F.M. During his episcopacy, he worked to gain racial equality in the diocese.

== Murder ==
On June 5, 1928, Guerry was shot in his office in St Philip's Church, Charleston, South Carolina, by J. H. Woodward, a retired priest who had attacked his position on advancing racial equality in South Carolina. Great opposition was also elicited by the bishop's proposal to have a black suffragan bishop. Woodward committed suicide after shooting Guerry, who died four days later in Roper Hospital.

== See also ==
- Historical list of bishops of the Episcopal Church in the United States of America
