= Church of the Redeemer (Orangeburg, South Carolina) =

Anglican church in South Carolina, US

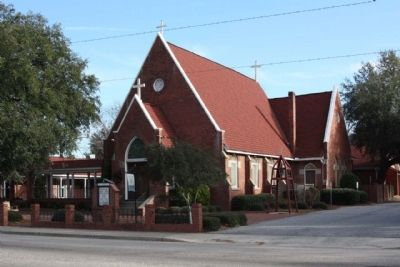
- Church of the Redeemer (Anglican Communion) in 2010

Religion
- Affiliation: Anglican Church in North America
- Rite: Diocese of South Carolina
- Status: active

Location
- Location: 1606 Russell Street, Orangeburg, South Carolina
- State: South Carolina
- Interactive map of Church of the Redeemer
- Coordinates: 33.49238°N 80.85804°W

Architecture
- Type: Church
- Style: Gothic Revival
- Completed: 1855 (current church building)

Specifications
- Spire: 1
- Materials: Brick with stone and stucco trim

The Church of the Redeemer is a parish of the Anglican Diocese of South Carolina, affiliated with the Anglican Church in North America, in the city of Orangeburg, South Carolina.

The first Anglican church in Orangeburg Township was established in 1749 by the Rev. John Giessendanner, and a chapel at Orangeburg was later provided by the Act of 1768, which created St. Matthew's Parish in Ft. Motte, South Carolina. Following a long dormant period, the Church of the Redeemer was organized. The current building was erected between 1854 and 1855 on Boulevard Street, near the corner of Amelia, where the cemetery remains. The structure, which features Louis Comfort Tiffany stained glass windows, was moved to its present site, improved and renovated in 1895.

In November 2012, the congregation, along with other churches in the Episcopal Diocese of South Carolina, left the national Episcopal Church of the United States, and in June 2017, formally joined the Anglican Church in North America.
