= Robert Smith (bishop) =

American clergyman, planter, prelate of the Episcopal Church (1732–1801)

The Right Reverend Robert Smith D.D.
- Bishop of South Carolina
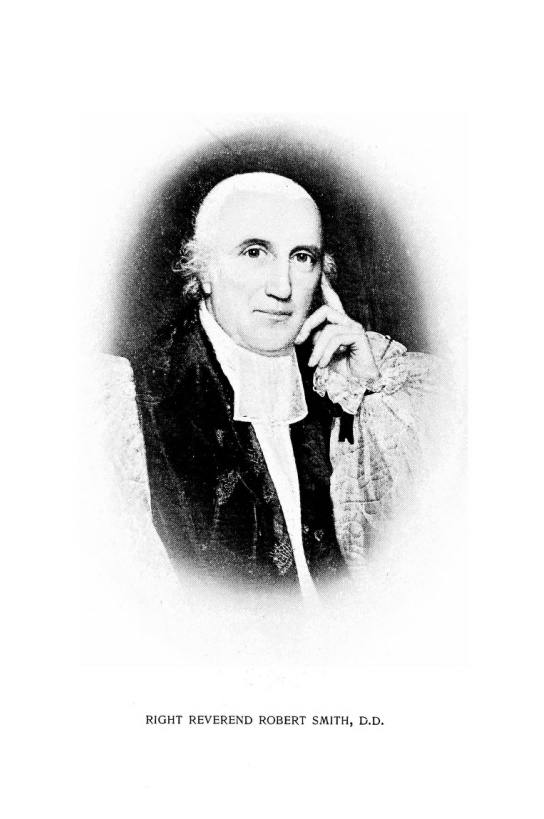
- Church: Episcopal Church
- Diocese: South Carolina
- Elected: February 10, 1795
- In office: 1795–1801
- Successor: Theodore Dehon

Orders
- Ordination: December 21, 1756 by Matthias Mawson
- Consecration: September 13, 1795 by William White

Personal details
- Born: August 25, 1732 Worstead, Norfolk
- Died: October 28, 1801 (aged 69) Charleston, South Carolina
- Buried: St. Philip's Church
- Denomination: Anglican
- Spouse: Elizabeth Paget (m. 1758; died 1771); Sarah Shubrick (m. 1774; died 1779); Anna Maria Tilghman (m. 1782; died 1792)

Robert Smith (August 25, 1732 – October 28, 1801) was an English-born American clergyman, planter and prelate of the Episcopal Church who served as the first Bishop of South Carolina from 1795 to 1801.

== Early life, education, and ordained ministry ==
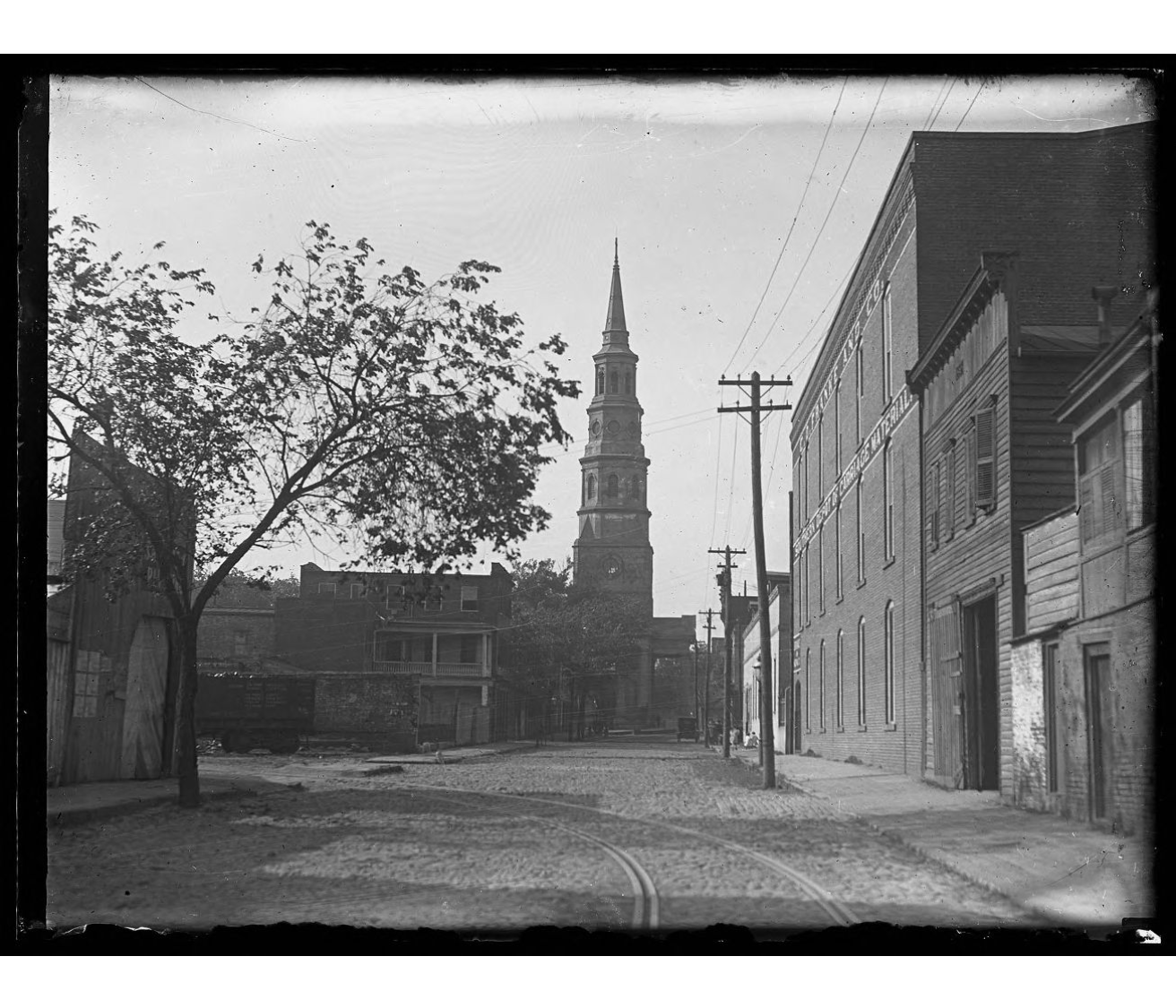
St. Philips Church in Charleston, South Carolina

Smith was born on August 25, 1732, in Worstead, Norfolk, England, to Stephen Smith and Hannah Press. He was educated at the Norwich Grammar School, before enrolling at Gonville and Caius College, Cambridge, from where he earned his Bachelor of Arts in 1753. He was awarded a Doctor of Divinity from the University of Pennsylvania in 1789.Smith was ordained deacon in the Church of England on March 7, 1756, and then priest on December 21, 1756, both by the Bishop of Ely Matthias Mawson. He then emigrated to the Province of South Carolina, where he became assistant minister of St Philip's Church in Charleston, South Carolina, in 1757. In 1759 he became rector of the same church. He was also a supporter of the American Revolution. He fled from Charleston after in 1780 to the Province of Maryland after the former was occupied by the British. While there, he served as priest-in-charge of St Paul's Church in Brandywine, Maryland. In 1783, he returned to serve as rector of St Philip's Church in Charleston. On February 10, 1795, Smith was unanimously elected the first Bishop of South Carolina and was consecrated on September 13, 1795, the sixth bishop in the American Episcopal succession.

== The 1775 Humiliation Sermon and other notable sermons ==
Bishop Robert Smith was known for his sermons relating to topics surrounding the Colonies and the American Revolution. On February 17, 1775, it is noted in the official sermon brief that Smith "Preached Before the Commons House of Assembly, and the Members of the Provincial Congress- at the request of the House, & Members of said Congress on February 17th 1775- Observed as a day of fasting & humiliation, on account of the unhappy differences between Great Britain & her Colonies." The importance of this sermon stems from Smith's vocabulary. Smith did not refer to any "colonies" or any possible threat of a "civil war," but rather referred to the ability of self governing colonies not as a right of man, but as a "right of man's duty to God."

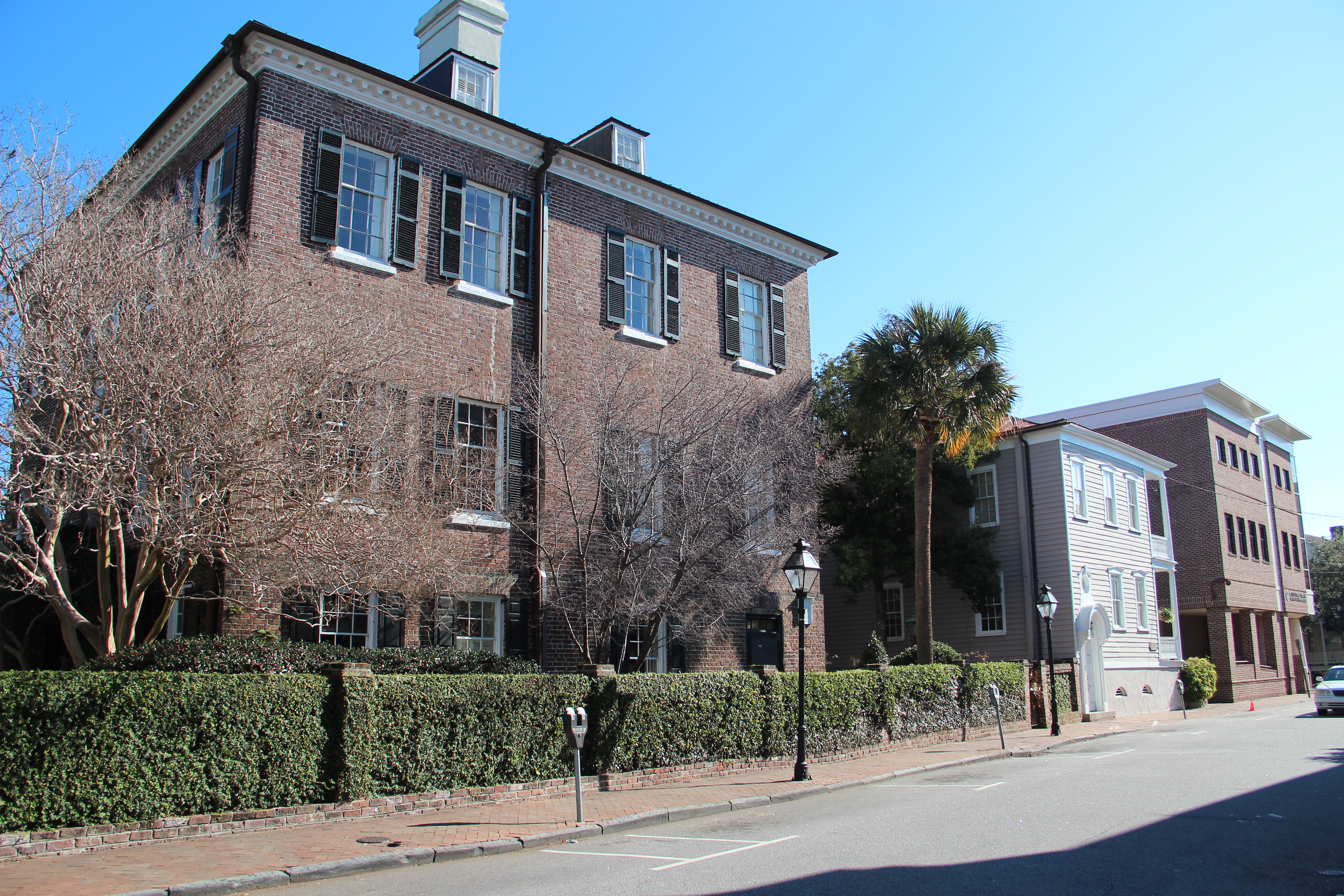
"The President's House" 6 Glebe Street, Charleston, South Carolina

Robert Smith's Humiliation Sermon of 1775 in its simplicity, allowed for an audience to be motivated in a religious sense. Smith insinuated that what the colonists were doing was in their divine right. There is no evidence of Smith's St. Philips congregation disapproving of this sermon. In other sermons, Smith propagated proslavery messages, as he was a wealthy member of the South Carolinian planter class. Because of his status, this allowed Smith to be equivalate to elite South Carolinian families, such as the Draytons', Middletons' or Pickneys'. Bishop Robert Smith's sermon style was to keep his audience eagerly waiting. He would take brief pauses in between paragraphs, building suspense, allowing for the audience to be at the edge of their seats. Smith purposely aimed his sermons at the individual level, that whatever an individual does, God should be at the center of their intentions.

== College of Charleston ==
Bishop Robert Smith, amongst several revolutionary leaders of South Carolina, signed the charter of the College of Charleston in 1785. A few months later on February 6, 1786, Robert Smith was voted as the first president of the College of Charleston. Alongside Smith, Thomas Bee served as vice-president, Daniel Bourdeaux as treasurer, and William Loughton Smith as secretary. The college began classes on July 3, 1785, inside the home of Bishop Robert Smith, located on 6 Glebe Street in the Harelston Village neighborhood. The building today still stands and serves as the residential home for the presidents to the college. Robert Bishop Smith retired from the presidential role in 1797, leaving the college to its second president, Thomas Bee Jr. Bishop Robert Smith's legacy to the College of Charleston was long noted and revered, and the "Bishop Robert Smith Award" was for many years the highest achievement that an undergraduate student could earn.

On October 29, 2020, the College of Charleston made the decision to no longer use Smith's name in its highest graduating student honor, the reason being Smith's ownership of slaves. The current president of the College of Charleston, President Andrew Hsu, said that his decision came when the discovery was made that "at the time of his death, Smith enslaved more than 200 people." This decision by the College of Charleston also effected the "Aiken's Fellows Society," a group reserved for the groups highest performing students within the school's honor college. The group is now known as the Charleston Fellows.

== Consecrators ==
- Samuel Seabury, 1st bishop of the Episcopal Church, serving Connecticut, and 2nd Presiding Bishop.
- Samuel Provoost, 3rd bishop of the Episcopal Church, first bishop of New York
- James Madison, 4th bishop of the Episcopal Church, first bishop of Virginia
- Thomas John Claggett, 5th bishop of the Episcopal Church, first bishop of Maryland

== Notes and references ==
Episcopal Church (USA) titles	Bishop of South Carolina; 1795–1801	Succeeded by Theodore Dehon
