= Cathedral of St. Luke and St. Paul (Charleston, South Carolina) =

Anglican cathedral in the United States

Cathedral Church of St. Luke and St. Paul
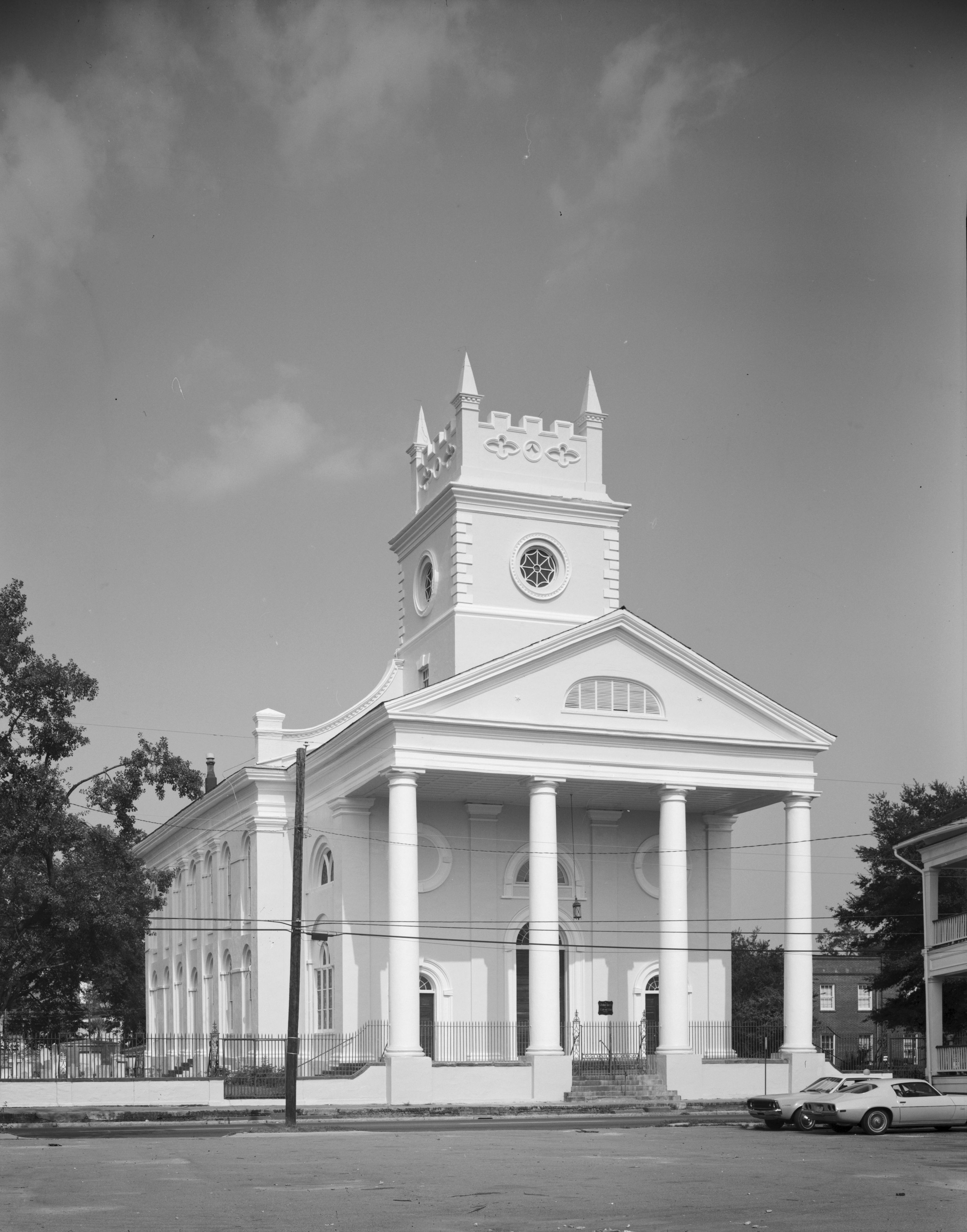

Religion
- Affiliation: Anglican Church in North America
- District: Diocese of South Carolina
- Ecclesiastical or organizational status: Cathedral
- Leadership: Charles F. Edgar, III, Bishop of South Carolina; R. Peet Dickinson, IV, Dean

Location
- Location: Coming Street Charleston, South Carolina, United States of America
- Interactive map of Cathedral Church of St. Luke and St. Paul
- Coordinates: 32.7870°N 79.9405°W

Architecture
- Style: Neo-Gothic
- Direction of façade: West

Website
- www.your-cathedral.org

The St. Luke and St. Paul Anglican Church, located on Coming Street in Charleston, is the cathedral of the Anglican Diocese of South Carolina. It was originally known as St. Paul's Radcliffeboro.

Construction began in 1811. The architectural style is typical of the period, the interior being almost devoid of ornamentation with the exception of the chancel which, according to Dalcho the historian, is “richly painted, and ornamented with Corinthian pilasters having gilt capitals”. This description still applies today, as during the redecorating of the interior after the hurricane of 1989, the colors and applications first used in 1815 were employed as much as current means allowed.

The building was in continuous use during the Civil War, harboring congregations from those churches nearer the strongholds of the Union forces, whose cannons bombarded the city constantly. The church's bell was dismantled and sent to Columbia to be melted down in support of the Confederate cause.

For the most part, the interior appears much as it did in 1815, a major exception being that of the stained-glass windows added later. In addition, the box pews were replaced in 1872 and the pulpit was moved from the middle aisle to its present location.

In 1949, the parish merged with the congregation of St. Luke's on Charlotte Street, itself long closely associated with St. Paul's, and the first combined service was held on July 17, 1949. Later, the present building was designated the cathedral church for the Diocese of South Carolina, with the leadership of the Rev Dr B Madison Currin. Bishop Gray Temple was officially “seated” here in November 1963.

The stained-glass windows in the apse of the sanctuary were installed in the fall of 1991 and, consistent with the post-hurricane restoration, are in the style of Sir Christopher Wren, the 17th century architect of St. Paul's Cathedral, London. They were designed and constructed by Willett Studios of Philadelphia and portray, on the left and right, the patron saints of the cathedral (St. Luke and St. Paul) with the center window depicting the crucified Christ, together with St. Mary and St. John.

The building is known for its acoustical properties and is often sought by performing artists, particularly during the Spoleto Festival.

In 2009, the long-time dean, William McKeachie, announced his retirement and the vestry called the Reverend Peet Dickinson to serve as dean. The same year the new dean, vestry, and executive finance committee took the necessary moves to retire the debt accumulated from structural renovations to the building.

The cathedral remained the diocesan seat of Bishop Mark Lawrence after the 2012 breakup of the historic diocese. Bishop Lawrence's diocese was received into the Anglican Church in North America on 27 June 2017. The other faction of the old diocese is today known as the Episcopal Diocese of South Carolina. Another historic Charleston church, Grace Church, was selected in 2015 as its new cathedral.
