= Chip Edgar =

American Anglican bishop

The Right Reverend Charles F. Edgar III
- Bishop of South Carolina
- Church: Anglican Church in North America
- Diocese: South Carolina
- See: Charleston
- In office: 2022–present
- Predecessor: Mark Lawrence

Orders
- Consecration: March 12, 2022 by Foley Beach

Personal details
- Born: August 25, 1964 (age 62)

Charles Francis "Chip" Edgar III (born August 8, 1964) is an American Anglican bishop. He has been bishop of the Anglican Diocese of South Carolina (ADOSC) since 2022.

== Early life, marriage and family ==
Edgar was born in 1964 to Charles F. Edgar Jr. and Virginia Edgar and raised in Huntsville, Alabama. He attended Westminster Christian Academy, which his parents cofounded and on whose board his father served. The academy was affiliated with present-day Westminster Presbyterian Church, which later joined the Presbyterian Church in America. In 1973, the board of the academy voted to admit black students for the first time.

Edgar attended Wheaton College from 1982 to 1986, majoring in physical education and winning a conference title in the 200 yard Butterfly as a significant member of the Varsity Swim Team. From 1987 to 1992, Edgar served in campus ministry roles with the Coalition for Christian Outreach at Grove City College and as a residence director at Wheaton. On September 2, 1989, he married Beth Anne Marcinko. They have two sons and three daughters, the youngest two of whom were adopted.

== Ordained ministry ==
Joining the Episcopal Church and receiving a call to ordained ministry, Edgar received an M.Div. from Trinity Evangelical Divinity School in 1992 and a master's degree from the School of Theology at Sewanee in 1997. He served as a curate at St. Paul's Episcopal Church, Chattanooga, from 1993 to 1994, and as canon pastor of the Cathedral Church of St. Luke in Orlando from 1994 to 1997.

In 1997, Edgar was called as rector of St. Mark's Episcopal Church in Glen Ellyn, Illinois, where during his tenure average Sunday attendance rose from 175 to nearly 500 and $3.4 million was raised for a parish hall and classroom expansion. From 2001 to 2003, Edgar was elected to the Bishop and Trustees of the Episcopal Diocese of Chicago, the body that oversees the diocese's real property.

After the consecration of Gene Robinson as bishop of New Hampshire, Edgar left the Episcopal Church and joined the Anglican Mission in America, under the authority of the Anglican Church of Rwanda. The Edgars moved to Columbia, South Carolina, where Edgar became the founding rector of Church of the Apostles. Services were held in the South Carolina State Museum Auditorium from 2004 to 2011, until the church completed new facilities in downtown Columbia. During his tenure, the church grew from a core group of 25 to have average Sunday attendance of nearly 400. In 2014, after several AMIA churches had left the organization to become part of PEARUSA, Church of the Apostles was designated as pro-cathedral of the PEARUSA Southeast Network. In 2016, the PEARUSA Southeast Network dissolved and Church of the Apostles joined the Anglican Diocese of the Carolinas, where it was designated as the diocesan cathedral and Edgar as dean.

During Edgar's tenure as rector and dean, Church of the Apostles commissioned church planters or church revitalizers in Bellevue, Washington; Woodstock, Georgia; Houston, Texas; Wilmore, Kentucky; Lynn Haven, Florida; and Lexington, South Carolina.

== Episcopal ministry ==
Edgar was elected bishop of Anglican diocese of South Carolina, succeeding Mark Lawrence, on October 16, 2021. He was consecrated by the Most Rev. Foley Beach on March 2, 2022, at the Cathedral Church of St. Luke and St. Paul. Edgar stated that his goal would be to accelerate church planting in the diocese, especially in the metro Charleston area, which has seen substantial population growth.

On September 13, 2022, Edgar ordained the Rev. Henrietta Rivers to the priesthood at St. John's Chapel in Charleston. Rivers is the first black woman ordained a priest in the ADOSC.

=== Outcome of litigation ===
Edgar's first year as bishop was dominated by the denouement of the long-running legal battle between the ADOSC and the Episcopal Diocese of South Carolina over properties valued at $500 million. In April 2022, the South Carolina Supreme Court issued a decision awarding 14 of the ADOSC's 29 contested parish properties to the EDOSC. (Note: These 14 properties were: Christ Church, Mount Pleasant; Good Shepherd, Charleston; Holy Comforter, Sumter; Holy Cross, Stateburg; Holy Trinity, Charleston; St. Bartholomew's, Hartsville; St. David's, Cheraw; St. Luke's, Hilton Head; St. Matthew's, Fort Motte; St. James, Charleston; St. John's, Johns Island; St. Jude's, Walterboro; Trinity, Myrtle Beach; and Old St. Andrew's, Charleston) Clarifying a lower court ruling that in turn interpreted an earlier Supreme Court decision in the matter, the Supreme Court determined that the 14 parishes did indeed create an “irrevocable trust in favor of the National Church and its diocese” by in some form adopting the Episcopal Church's 1979 Dennis Canon.

Several of the parishes requested a rehearing, arguing that, based on the court's criteria, they had not placed their property in trust (or had revoked the trust pursuant to South Carolina law) for the benefit of the Episcopal Church and its associated diocese. In August 2022, the court granted the petitions of six of the parishes, leaving just eight parish properties set to be returned to EDOSC. (Note: These eight properties were: St. John's on Johns Island, Christ Church in Mount Pleasant, St. David's in Cheraw, Holy Trinity in Charleston, St. Bartholomew's in Hartsville, St. James on James Island, St. Matthew's in Fort Motte, and Good Shepherd in Charleston.) (In October 2022, without a critical mass of Episcopalians to restart a congregation, the EDOSC agreed to sell St. Matthew's, Fort Motte, to the ADOSC congregation.)

Edgar and EDOSC Bishop Ruth Woodliff-Stanley, who had been consecrated in 2021, began mediation to discuss a resolution to the disputes between the dioceses in spring 2022. On September 26, 2022, Edgar and Woodliff-Stanley jointly announced a settlement between the dioceses. While the settlement did not affect remaining issues regarding the property rights of three parishes still pending before the state Supreme Court or a betterments lawsuit by several parishes pending in state trial court, "it does resolve all remaining issues regarding diocesan properties." As part of the settlement, St. Christopher Camp and Conference Center on Seabrook Island was transferred from the ADOSC to the EDOSC on October 1, 2022. Under the settlement, the ADOSC also transferred the bishop's residence in Charleston, additional diocesan-owned real property in Charleston and Santee. The EDOSC waived claims to the ADOSC's leasehold interest in the diocesan headquarters. Historical papers in ADOSC possession will be made available for copying by both dioceses and then donated to the South Carolina Historical Society or another mutually agreed nonprofit; similarly, historical silver in ADOSC without a claim by a parish will be donated to the Charleston Museum or another mutually agreed nonprofit. Bishops' portraits in the possession of ADOSC will be copied and then transferred to EDOSC.

Both the ADOSC and the EDOSC agreed to provide quitclaim deeds to ADOSC church plants whose properties were not subject to orders in the litigation. They also agreed to dismiss pending litigation in federal court over diocesan names and seals, leaving the EDOSC as the owner of the historical name and seal. “This settlement agreement allows us to invest our diocesan energy, time, focus, and resources in gospel ministry rather than litigation," Edgar commented. "While the losses we have experienced, including those of St. Christopher and several of our parish buildings are painful, I am grateful that the work we have done has brought an end to litigation between our dioceses."

=== ACNA provincial matters ===
In mid-2024, Edgar was informed by a priest in his diocese about allegations of sexual harassment against Steve Wood, the newly elected archbishop of the ACNA and the bishop of the Diocese of the Carolinas, which overlaps the Diocese of South Carolina geographically. Edgar declined to support an effort to bring formal charges against Wood until March 2025, when he later said he had received a full picture of the allegations and when he agreed to be one of the three bishops required to bring a presentment against another bishop. Other ACNA bishops approached by the clergy developing the presentment either refused to read the charges or refused to join the presentment.

In October 2025, The Washington Post reported the allegations against Wood, who said through the ACNA provincial office that the complainants had first gone to media instead of pursuing the church's official mechanisms for reported misconduct. Edgar, who had known about the allegations since 2024, responded that this claim was untrue. The presentment, filed by 10 clergy and lay people, was reviewed by a panel that recommended Wood be tried on the charges in a church court.

=== Porter-Gaud controversy and presentment ===
On August 18, 2026, Edgar participated alongside Episcopalian Bishop of South Carolina Ruth Woodliff-Stanley in a joint chapel blessing at the Porter-Gaud School. The event included a Eucharist celebrated by the Director of the National Association of Episcopal Schools, during which Edgar and Woodliff-Stanley administered Holy Communion. According to Woodliff-Stanley, neither bishop participated as a celebrant. Photos of the event circulated widely and generated sharp criticism within the ACNA.

Edgar apologized on August 25, expressing regret for causing "anger and pain". Meanwhile, the acting primate of the ACNA, Julian Dobbs, denounced the chapel dedication as an occasion of "great offense." On September 2, Dobbs announced that "the seriousness of the situation led a complement of Bishops" to file disciplinary charges against Edgar in the form of a presentment. The same day, Edgar's standing committee said that the charges, filed on August 30, accused Edgar of giving "just cause for scandal or offense." Dobbs said that Edgar "agreed with the charges against him," and Edgar submitted himself to sentencing by the ACNA's College of Bishops at its meeting on September 21.

== Notes ==
Religious titles
Preceded by Mark Lawrence	Bishop of South Carolina; 2022 – present	Succeeded by Incumbent
