= C. FitzSimons Allison =

American Anglican bishop and an author (born 1927)

The Right Reverend Christopher FitzSimons Allison
- Retired Bishop of South Carolina
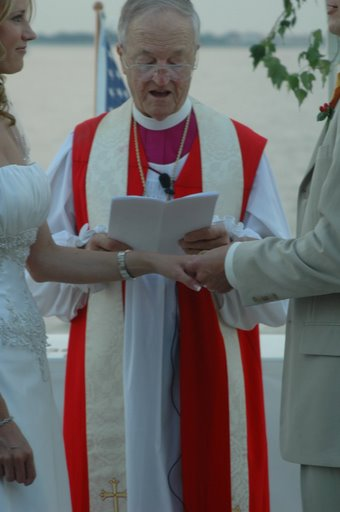
- Allison marrying his granddaughter to her fiancé
- Church: Episcopal Church (until 2022); Anglican Church in North America (since 2022)
- Diocese: South Carolina
- Elected: May 17, 1980
- In office: 1982–1990
- Predecessor: Gray Temple
- Successor: Edward L. Salmon Jr.
- Previous post: Coadjutor Bishop of South Carolina (1980-1982)

Orders
- Ordination: May 23, 1953 by John J. Gravatt
- Consecration: September 25, 1980 by John Allin

Personal details
- Born: March 5, 1927 (age 99) Columbia, South Carolina, United States
- Denomination: Anglican
- Parents: James Richard Allison, Susan Milliken FitzSimons
- Spouse: Martha Allston Parker (m. June 10, 1950)
- Education: University of the South

Christopher FitzSimons Allison (born March 5, 1927) is a retired American Anglican bishop and an author. He is known for his role in the Anglican realignment, and his participation in the controversial consecration in 2000 of two bishops opposed to the blessing of same-sex unions by the Episcopal Church, that took place in Singapore. He resides in Georgetown, South Carolina, where he serves as a retired bishop of the Anglican Diocese of South Carolina in the Anglican Church in North America since 2022.

== Biography ==
=== Education and career ===
Allison was born and raised in Columbia, South Carolina. He attended the University of the South and, after having his studies briefly interrupted by service in the United States Army during World War II after which he was discharged with the rank of Master Sergeant, he received a Bachelor of Arts degree in 1949. He then studied at Virginia Theological Seminary, from which he graduated with a Bachelor of Divinity degree in 1952. He was ordained deacon in June 1952 and priest in May 1953 by Bishop John J. Gravatt. Allison later studied at Oxford University and received the Doctor of Philosophy degree in 1956. He then taught church history at the School of Theology at the University of the South and at Virginia Theological Seminary.

He served as rector of Grace Episcopal Church in New York City before being elected as a bishop of the Episcopal Diocese of South Carolina. He was consecrated a bishop on 25 September 1980 by Bishop John Allin and was appointed coadjutor bishop of the Diocese of South Carolina in 1980, becoming the twelfth diocesan bishop on January 2, 1982. He retired in 1990 but has continued preaching, speaking, and writing.

=== Anglican realignment ===
Starting from the 1980s, Bishop Allison grew increasingly critical of the liberal tendencies inside the Episcopal Church. In 1990, during a meeting of the House of Bishops at the Kanuga Conference Center in Hendersonville, he openly attacked liberals in the Church, accusing them of apostasy. After the clash, a Holy Eucharist was celebrated, during which Allison refused to share the consecrated bread and wine with the rest of the House of Bishops, in a sign of broken communion.

==== Controversial consecrations ====
In 2000, Allison participated in the consecrations of Charles Murphy and John Rodgers, who were both priests in the Episcopal Church, as missionary bishops to the United States from the Anglican Church of Rwanda and the Church of the Province of South East Asia. Bishops Murphy and Rogers provided leadership to the conservative Anglican Mission in America, in which Allison, although remaining a member of the Episcopal Church, has also been active.

These consecrations, which occurred in Singapore, were controversial in the Episcopal Church as they were an act of protest against the church's blessing of same-sex unions but were also considered to be a breach of church unity. Other consecrators were Emmanuel Kolini, Archbishop of the Province of Rwanda, Moses Tay, Archbishop of the Province of South East Asia, John Rucyahana, Bishop of Shyira (Rwanda), Alex D. Dickson, retired Bishop of West Tennessee, and David Pytches, former Bishop of Chile, Bolivia and Peru and now a vicar in England.

==== Joining the ACNA ====
In 2022, Allison notified Presiding Episcopal Bishop Michael Curry that he had been received into the Anglican Church in North America, thus formally leaving the Episcopal Church after 69 years of ordained ministry. He resides in Georgetown, South Carolina, where he serves as a retired bishop of the Anglican Diocese of South Carolina.

== Writings ==
- The Rise of Moralism: The Proclamation of the Gospel from Hooker to Baxter, New York: The Seabury Press, 1966.
- Guilt, Anger, and God: The Patterns of Our Discontents, New York: The Seabury Press, 1972.
- The Cruelty of Heresy: An Affirmation of Christian Orthodoxy, Harrisburg: Morehouse Publishing, 1994. ISBN 9780819215130
- Fear, Love, and Worship, Regent College Publishing, 2003. ISBN 9781573832618
- Trust in an Age of Arrogance, The Lutterworth Press, 2009. ISBN 9781606085554

Anglican Communion titles
Preceded by Gray Temple	XII Bishop of South Carolina; 1982–1990	Succeeded by Edward L. Salmon Jr.
