= Christ Church (Florence, South Carolina) =

Historic church in South Carolina, United States

- U.S. National Register of Historic Places
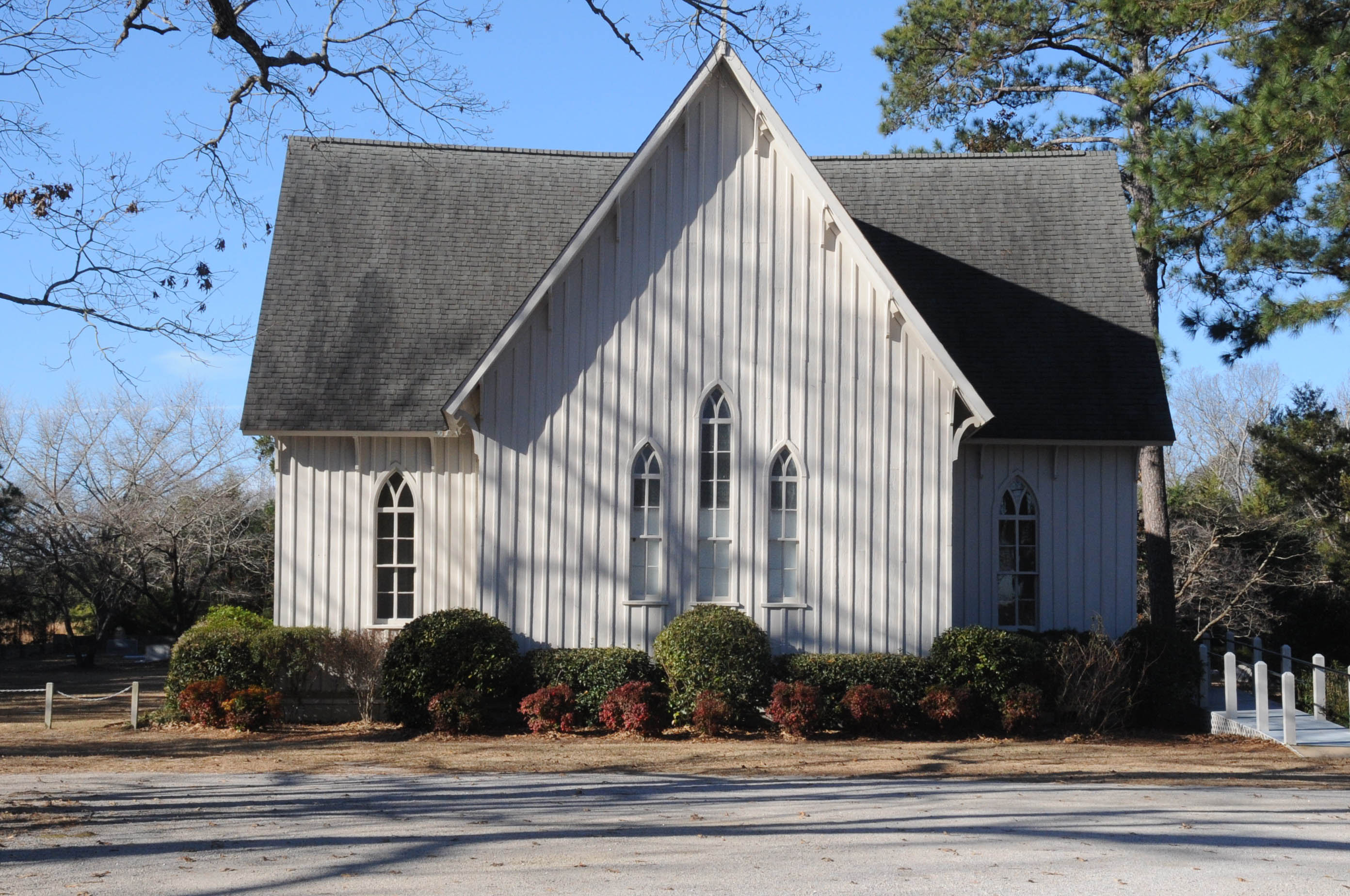

- Location within South Carolina Location within the United States
- Location: Northeast of Florence on South Carolina Highway 327, near Florence, South Carolina
- Coordinates: 34°14′32″N 79°11′35″W
- Area: 2 acres (0.81 ha)
- Built: 1859
- Architectural style: Gothic Revival, Carpenter Gothic
- NRHP reference No.: 78002507
- Added to NRHP: November 14, 1978

Christ Church is a historic church located near Florence, Florence County, South Carolina. It was constructed in 1859, and is a Carpenter Gothic-style church building. It has a cruciform plan, with board and batten construction, a steeply pitched roof with simple wooden brackets, and pointed-arched windows and doors. It is part of the Anglican Diocese of South Carolina in the Anglican Church in North America.

It was listed on the National Register of Historic Places in 1978.
