= George E. Haynsworth =

George Edward Haynsworth (October 25, 1922 – November 24, 2012) served as a bishop in the Episcopal Church in El Salvador, Nicaragua, and the Episcopal Diocese of South Carolina. He was an alumnus of the Citadel (1940) and the University of the South.
