= Theodore Dehon =

American bishop

The Right Reverend Theodore Dehon D.D.
- Bishop of South Carolina
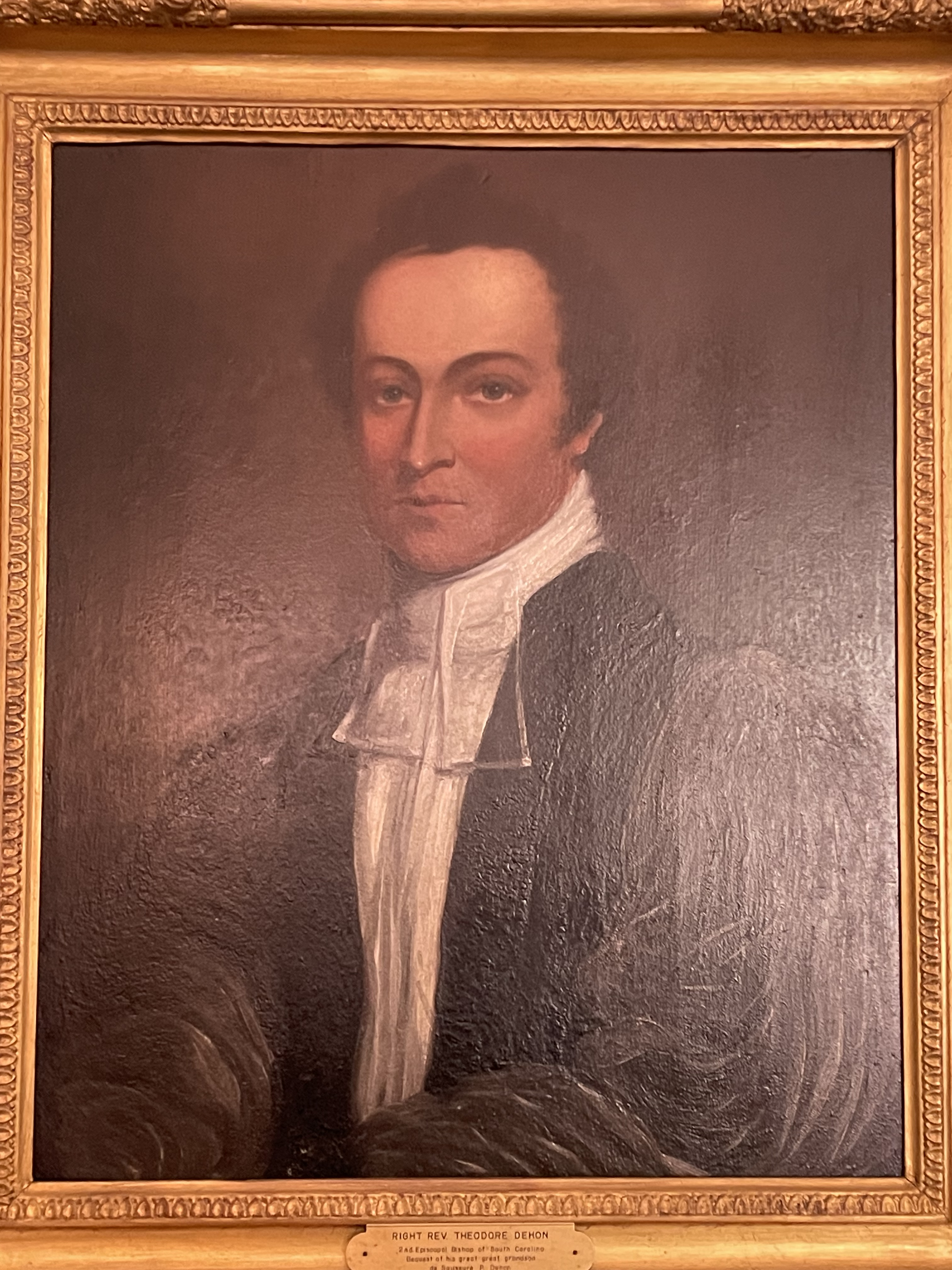
- portrait by John Stevens Cogdell
- Church: Episcopal Church
- Diocese: South Carolina
- Elected: February 20, 1812
- In office: 1812–1817
- Predecessor: Robert Smith
- Successor: Nathaniel Bowen

Orders
- Ordination: October 9, 1800 by Edward Bass
- Consecration: October 15, 1812 by William White

Personal details
- Born: December 8, 1776 Boston, Massachusetts, United States
- Died: August 6, 1817 (aged 40) Charleston, South Carolina, United States
- Buried: St. Michael's Churchyard
- Denomination: Anglican
- Parents: Theodore and Frances Dehon
- Spouse: Sarah Russell (m. 1813)
- Children: 3
- Education: Harvard College

Theodore Dehon (December 8, 1776 – August 6, 1817) was the second bishop of the Episcopal Diocese of South Carolina.

== Biography ==
Theodore Dehon was born in Boston and graduated from Harvard University in 1795. He was ordained deacon by Bishop Edward Bass in Newburyport, Massachusetts, on December 24, 1797, and the next month began his call as rector of Trinity Church, Newport, Rhode Island. He was ordained priest on October 9, 1800.

After paying a visit to South Carolina he was offered positions in Charleston, but demurred until 1810, when he accepted a position as rector of St. Michael's Church, Charleston. He was elected diocesan bishop in February 1812 and was consecrated on October 15, 1812. After the General Convention in New York City in 1817, he returned to Charleston but contracted yellow fever, dying August 6. He was buried at St. Michael's Church. His writings met with some posthumous success.

His obituary in the Essex Register of Saturday 23 August 1817 reads: "To our bill of mortality we have to add the death of the Right Reverend Theodore Dehon, D.D aged 41, Bishop of the Protestant Episcopal Church of the English Communion, in S. Carolina, on the 6th instant. This amiable man and truly Christian Bishop was born in Boston, and graduated at Cambridge in 1795. He succeeded Bishop Robert Smith, who died in 1801, but not immediately, but in 1812. To a suavity of manners, correct elocution, and a soul of devotion, he added the purity and best accomplishments of life, a just taste, and an excellent judgement, with an extensive knowledge of the duties and the studies of his profession."

=== Consecrators ===
- William White, 1st bishop of Pennsylvania and 1st and 4th Presiding Bishop
- Abraham Jarvis, 2nd bishop of Connecticut
- John Henry Hobart, Coadjutor bishop of New York

Theodore Dehon was the 11th bishop consecrated for the Episcopal Church.

== References and external links ==
- Virtual American Biographies, edited from Appleton Encyclopedia
- Material by and about Dehon from Project Canterbury
- The Episcopal Church Annual. Morehouse Publishing: New York, NY (2005).

== See also ==
- Succession of Bishops of the Episcopal Church in the United States

Episcopal Church (USA) titles
Preceded by Robert Smith	2nd Bishop of South Carolina; 1812 – 1817	Succeeded by Nathaniel Bowen
