= Albert Sidney Thomas =

American bishop (1873–1967)

The Right Reverend Albert Sidney Thomas LL.D., D.D., S.T.D.
- Bishop of South Carolina
- Church: Episcopal Church
- Diocese: South Carolina
- Elected: September 18, 1928
- In office: 1928–1944
- Predecessor: William A. Guerry
- Successor: Thomas N. Carruthers

Orders
- Ordination: March 3, 1901 by Ellison Capers
- Consecration: November 30, 1928 by John Gardner Murray

Personal details
- Born: February 6, 1873 Columbia, South Carolina, United States
- Died: October 8, 1967 (aged 94) Columbia, South Carolina, United States
- Buried: St. Michael's Episcopal Church (Charleston, South Carolina)
- Denomination: Anglican
- Parents: LeGrand Felder Guerry & Margaret Serena Brailsford
- Spouse: Emily Jordan Carrison (m. 1908)
- Children: 3

Albert Sidney Thomas (February 6, 1873 – October 8, 1967) was ninth bishop of the Episcopal Diocese of South Carolina, serving from 1928 to 1944. His father was John Peyre Thomas, Sr.

== Early life and education ==
Thomas was born on February 6, 1873, in Columbia, South Carolina, the son of John Peyre Thomas and Mary Caroline Gibbes. He studied at the State Military College in Charleston, South Carolina and graduated with a Bachelor of Science in 1892. He was awarded a Doctor of Laws from the same institution in 1931. He also studied at the General Theological Seminary and graduated with a Bachelor of Divinity in 1900. On December 17, 1908, he married Emily Jordan Carrison (1887-1955). He was awarded a Doctor of Sacred Theology from the General Seminary in 1930. he also did some postgraduate studies at the South Carolina College. He was also awarded an honorary Doctor of Divinity degree from Sewanee: The University of the South in 1929.

== Ordained ministry ==
Thomas was ordained deacon on July 22, 1900, and priest, March 3, 1901, by Bishop Ellison Capers in Trinity Church, Columbia, South Carolina. He then served as rector of St Matthew's Church in Darlington, South Carolina from 1900 until 1908. Between 1908 and 1921, he was rector of St David's Church in Cheraw, South Carolina while in 1918, he briefly served as rector of the Church of the Good Shepherd in Columbia, South Carolina. In 1921, he became rector of St Michael's Church in Charleston, South Carolina, where he remained until 1928. He also served as chairman of the department of missions and president of the standing committee of the Diocese of South Carolina.

== Bishop ==
On September 18, Thomas was elected Bishop of South Carolina on the fifth ballot. He was consecrated on November 30, 1928, in St Michael's Church, where he had been rector since 1921. He was consecrated by Presiding Bishop John Gardner Murray as chief consecrator. He retired in 1944.
