= Thomas F. Davis =

American bishop

The Right Reverend Thomas Frederick Davis D.D.
- Bishop of South Carolina
- Church: Episcopal Church
- Diocese: South Carolina
- Elected: 1853
- In office: 1853–1871
- Predecessor: Christopher Edwards Gadsden
- Successor: William B. W. Howe

Orders
- Ordination: December 16, 1832 by Levi Silliman Ives
- Consecration: October 17, 1853 by Thomas Church Brownell

Personal details
- Born: February 8, 1804 Wilmington, North Carolina, United States
- Died: December 2, 1871 (aged 67) Camden, South Carolina, United States
- Buried: Old Quaker Cemetery
- Denomination: Anglican
- Parents: Thomas Frederick Davis & Sarah Isabella Eagles
- Spouse: Elizabeth Fleming (m. 1826; d. 1828); Ann Ivie Moore
- Children: 7

Thomas Frederick Davis (February 8, 1804 – December 2, 1871) was the fifth Episcopal Bishop of South Carolina.

== Early life ==
Davis was born in Wilmington, North Carolina, the son of Thomas F. Davis and Sarah I. (Eagles) Davis. His great-grandmother was the sister of John and Samuel Ashe. His brother, George Davis was Attorney General of the Confederate States. Davis graduated from the University of North Carolina at Chapel Hill in 1822. He was ordained deacon on November 27, 1831, by Bishop Levi Silliman Ives, and ordained priest the following year on December 16. As deacon, Davis officiated at St. Bartholomew's Episcopal Church in Pittsboro, North Carolina and at Calvary Episcopal Church in Wadesboro, North Carolina. After his ordination to the priesthood, he became rector of St. James Church in Wilmington and later was rector of St. Luke's Episcopal Church (Salisbury, North Carolina) in Salisbury. In 1846, he moved to South Carolina to become rector of Grace Church in Camden.

== Bishop of South Carolina ==
Davis was elected Bishop of South Carolina in 1853. He was the 57th bishop in the PECUSA, and was consecrated by Bishops Thomas Church Brownell, John Henry Hopkins, and Benjamin Bosworth Smith. After secession, he aligned with the Protestant Episcopal Church in the Confederate States of America during the American Civil War. He served as bishop until his death in 1871.
