= Gray Temple =

Bishop of the Episcopal Diocese of South Carolina

The Right Reverend Gray Temple D.D.
- Bishop of South Carolina
- Church: Episcopal Church
- Diocese: South Carolina
- Elected: September 27, 1960
- In office: 1961–1982
- Predecessor: Thomas N. Carruthers
- Successor: C. FitzSimons Allison

Orders
- Ordination: June 1, 1939 by Edwin A. Penick
- Consecration: January 11, 1961 by Arthur C. Lichtenberger

Personal details
- Born: March 13, 1914 Lewiston, Maine, United States
- Died: October 27, 1999 (aged 85) West Columbia, South Carolina, United States
- Buried: Trinity Cathedral
- Denomination: Anglican
- Parents: Charles Hosea Temple & Mary Eleanor Gray
- Spouse: Maria Louisa Drane (m. 1940)
- Children: 3
- Education: Brown University

Charles Gray Temple (March 11, 1914 – October 27, 1999) was eleventh bishop of the Episcopal Diocese of South Carolina, serving from 1961 to 1982.

== Early life and education ==
Temple was born on March 13, 1914, in Lewiston, Maine, the son of the Reverend Charles Hosea Temple (1882-1944), a minister of the First Universalist Church of the Redeemer, and Mary Eleanor Gray (1879-1967). He was educated at the Warren, Rhode Island, high school, and then at Brown University, from where he graduated with a Bachelor of Arts in 1935. He graduated from the Virginia Theological Seminary with a Bachelor of Divinity in 1938.

== Ordained ministry ==
Temple was ordained deacon on May 29, 1938, by Bishop James De Wolf Perry of Rhode Island, and priest on June 1, 1939, by Bishop Edwin A. Penick of North Carolina. From 1938 till 1940, he served as curate at Calvary Church and the Edgecombe County missions in Tarboro, North Carolina. On January 29, 1940, he married Maria Louisa Drane, and together had three sons. From 1940 till 1941 he served as rector of Truro Church in Fairfax, Virginia. In 1941, he became priest-in-charge of St John's Church in Battleboro, North Carolina, and rector of the Church of the Good Shepherd in Rocky Mount, North Carolina. He retained the former post till 1947 and the latter till 1953. In 1953, he transferred to Charlotte, North Carolina, to serve as rector of St Peter's Church. Between 1955 and 1961, he served as rector of Trinity Church in Columbia, South Carolina.

== Bishop ==
On September 27, 1960, Temple was elected on the fifth ballot as Bishop of South Carolina, during a special convention held in the Church of the Holy Comforter in Sumter, South Carolina. He was consecrated on January 11, 1961, in St Luke's and St Paul's Church, Charleston, South Carolina, with Presiding Bishop Arthur C. Lichtenberger as chief consecrator. Bishop Temple's episcopacy is well known for its progressive moves in the Diocese of South Carolina, notably regarding racial equality, and the ceasing of segregated churches and the archdeaconry for black people. In 1963, he chose the Parish Church of St Luke and St Paul in Charleston, South Carolina, as the diocesan cathedral. Temple died on October 27, 1999, at the South Carolina Episcopal Retirement Community at West Columbia, South Carolina.
