= St. Philip's Church (Charleston, South Carolina) =

Historic church in South Carolina, United States

- U.S. National Register of Historic Places
- U.S. National Historic Landmark
- U.S. National Historic Landmark District – Contributing property
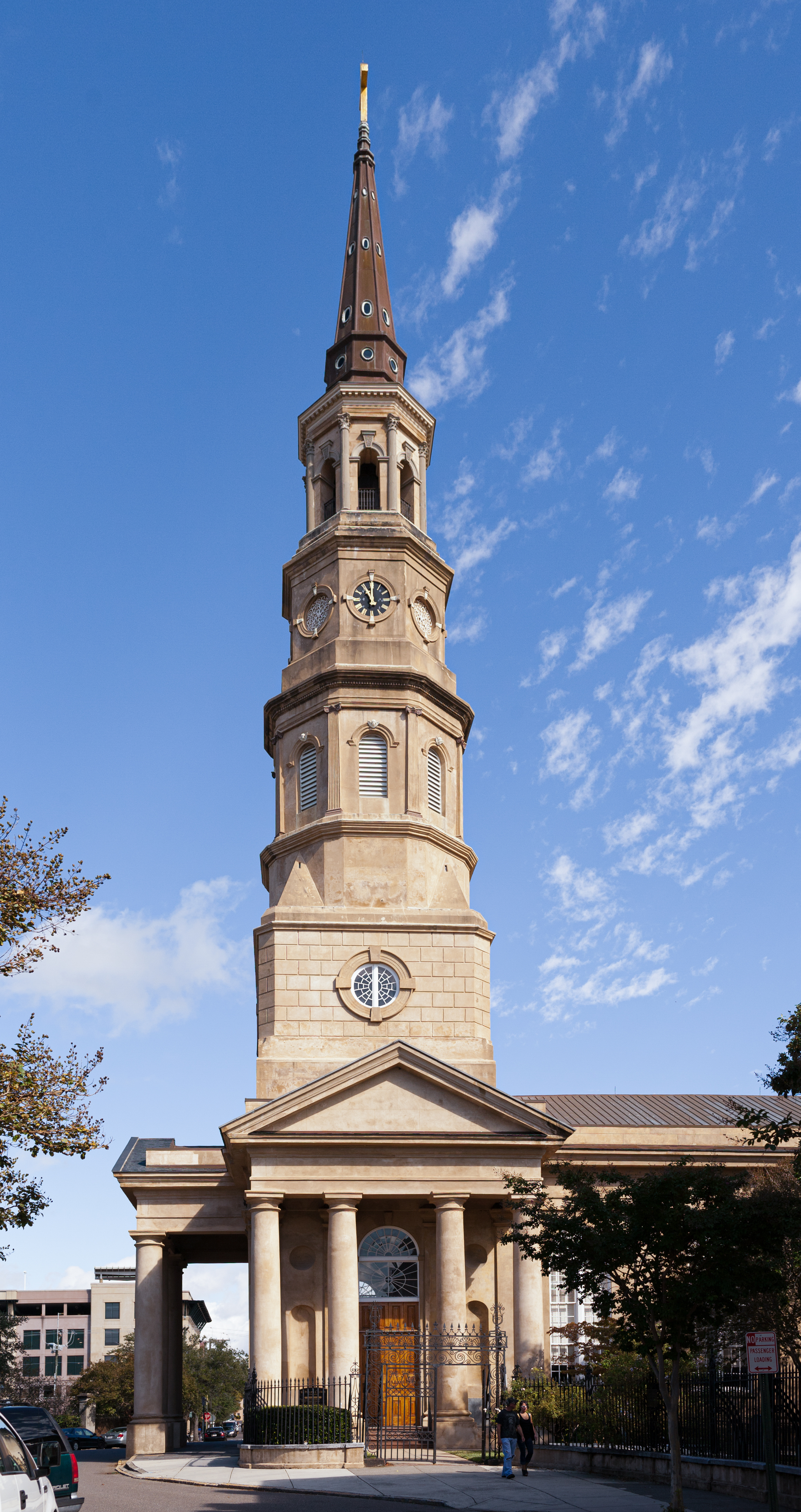
- St. Philip's Church

- Location within South Carolina Location within the United States
- Location: 142 Church Street, Charleston, South Carolina
- Coordinates: 32°46′45″N 79°55′45″W
- Built: 1835-1836, building; steeple, 1848-1850
- Architect: Joseph Hyde, building; Edward Brickell White, steeple
- Part of: Charleston Historic District (ID66000964)
- NRHP reference No.: 73001695

Significant dates
- Added to NRHP: November 7, 1973
- Designated NHL: November 7, 1973
- Designated NHLDCP: October 9, 1960

St. Philip's Church is a historic church at 142 Church Street in Charleston, South Carolina. It was formerly an Episcopal church, but it is currently a parish of the Anglican Diocese of South Carolina, in the Anglican Church in North America. Its National Historic Landmark description states: "Built in 1836 (spire completed in 1850), this stuccoed brick church features an imposing tower designed in the Wren-Gibbs tradition. Three Tuscan pedimented porticoes contribute to this design to make a building of the highest quality and sophistication." On November 7, 1973, it was added to the National Register of Historic Places and designated a National Historic Landmark.

== History ==
Established in 1680, St. Philip's is the oldest European-American religious congregation in South Carolina. The first St. Philip's Church, a wooden building, was built between 1680 and 1681 at the corner of Broad and Meeting streets on the present day site of St. Michael's Episcopal Church. It was damaged in a hurricane in 1710 and a new St. Phillip's Church was begun a few blocks away on Church Street. After being delayed it was finished in 1723. It burned to the ground in 1835. Work on the present church was begun that same year and completed the next. The steeple was added between 1848 and 1850.

A prominent early rector of St. Philip's was Rev. Thomas Frost, a fellow of Caius College, Cambridge, who became rector of St. Philip's in 1785. Leading the church in the post-Revolutionary War period, he had to create a new role after Anglicanism was disestablished in the United States. Rev. Frost died in 1804 at 46 years of age. Rev. Thomas Downes Frost, son of the first rector Frost, was chosen as assistant minister of St. Philip's on March 12, 1815. The second Rev. Frost died an early death at age 26 in 1819.

Henrietta Johnston, the wife of another early rector, Gideon Johnston, became the first recorded female artist in the American colonies. Mary Roberts, the first female American miniaturist, was connected to the church and buried here in 1761, as recorded in the register.

The tower of St. Philip's served for many years as the rear tower of a set of range lighthouses serving to guide mariners into Charleston's harbor; the front tower of the range was located on Fort Sumter. The light was used from 1893 to 1915. The use was restored temporarily in 1921 when the normal light needed repairs.

The church was the site of a convention on November 17, 2012, which sought to legitimize the disassociation of the Anglican Diocese of South Carolina from The Episcopal Church, and to amend the diocesan constitution and canons to remove all references to the Episcopal Church. As a result, the title to the building was disputed between the Anglican Diocese and the Episcopal Diocese.

On 17 August 2022, the South Carolina Supreme Court affirmed the property rights of six parishes, including St. Philip's Church, of the Anglican Diocese of South Carolina, who will be able to keep them because of this decision.

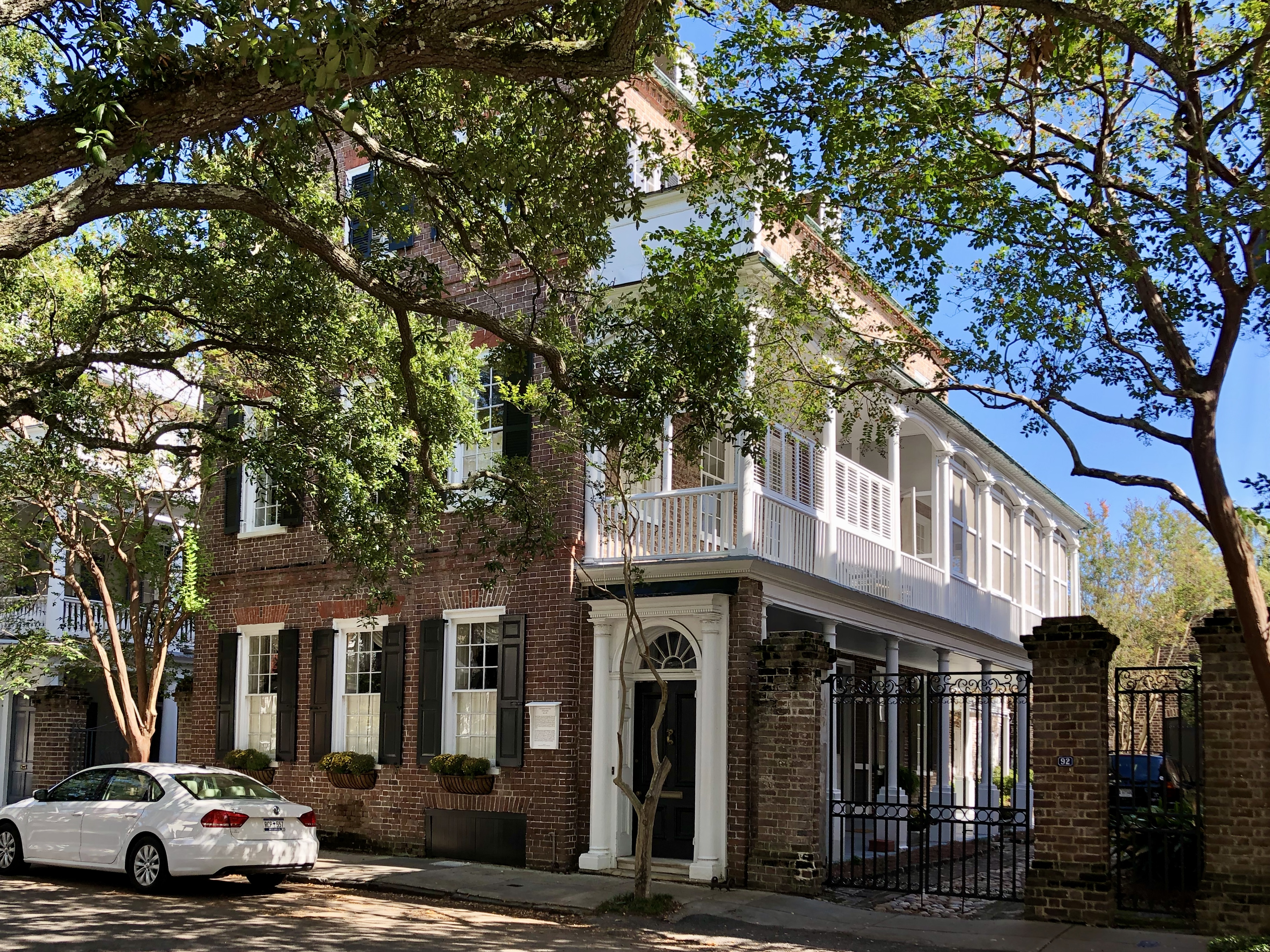
The Alexander Christie House (ca. 1805) has served as the rectory of church since 1908

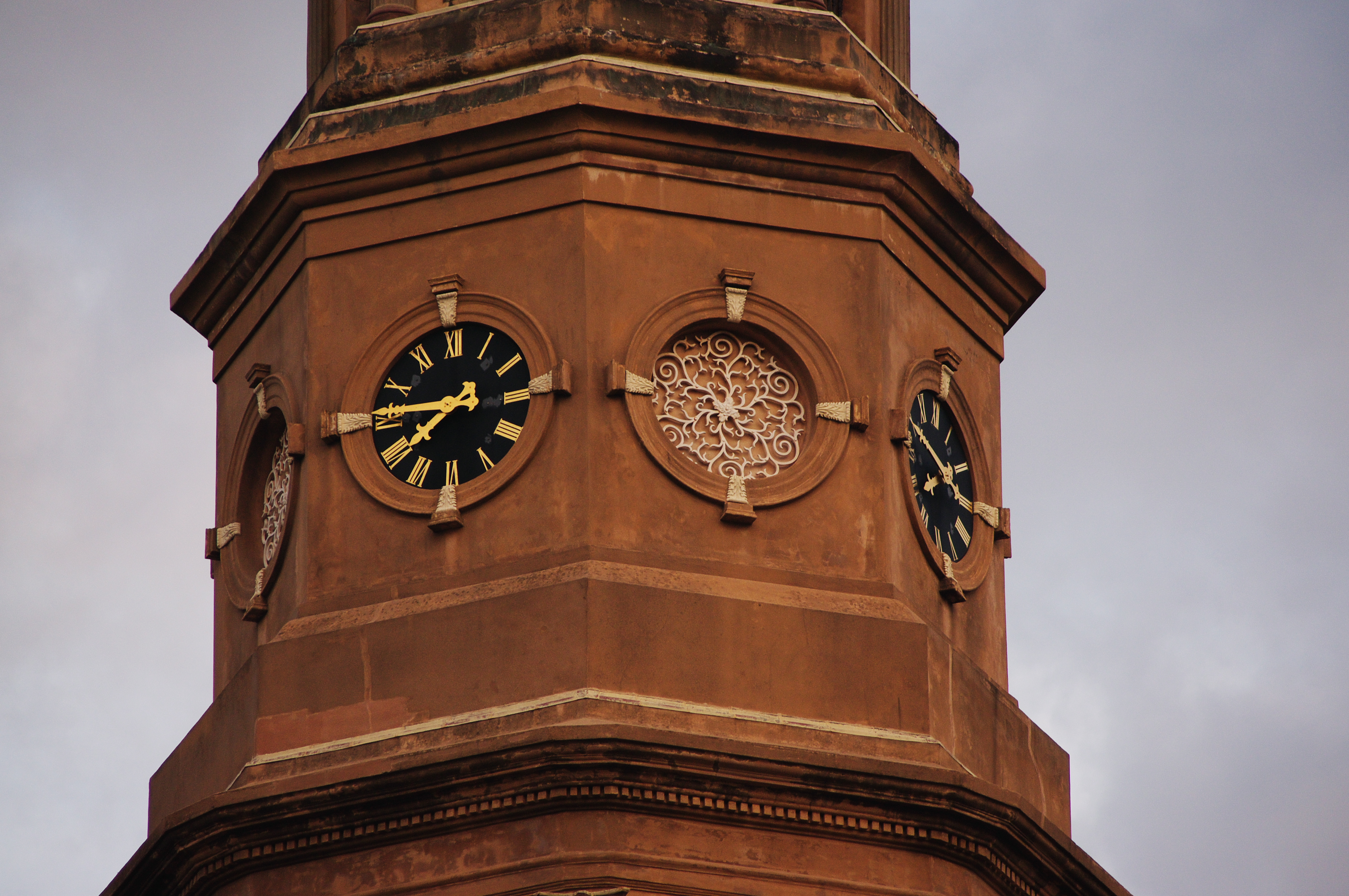
The building's steeple is adorned with clocks

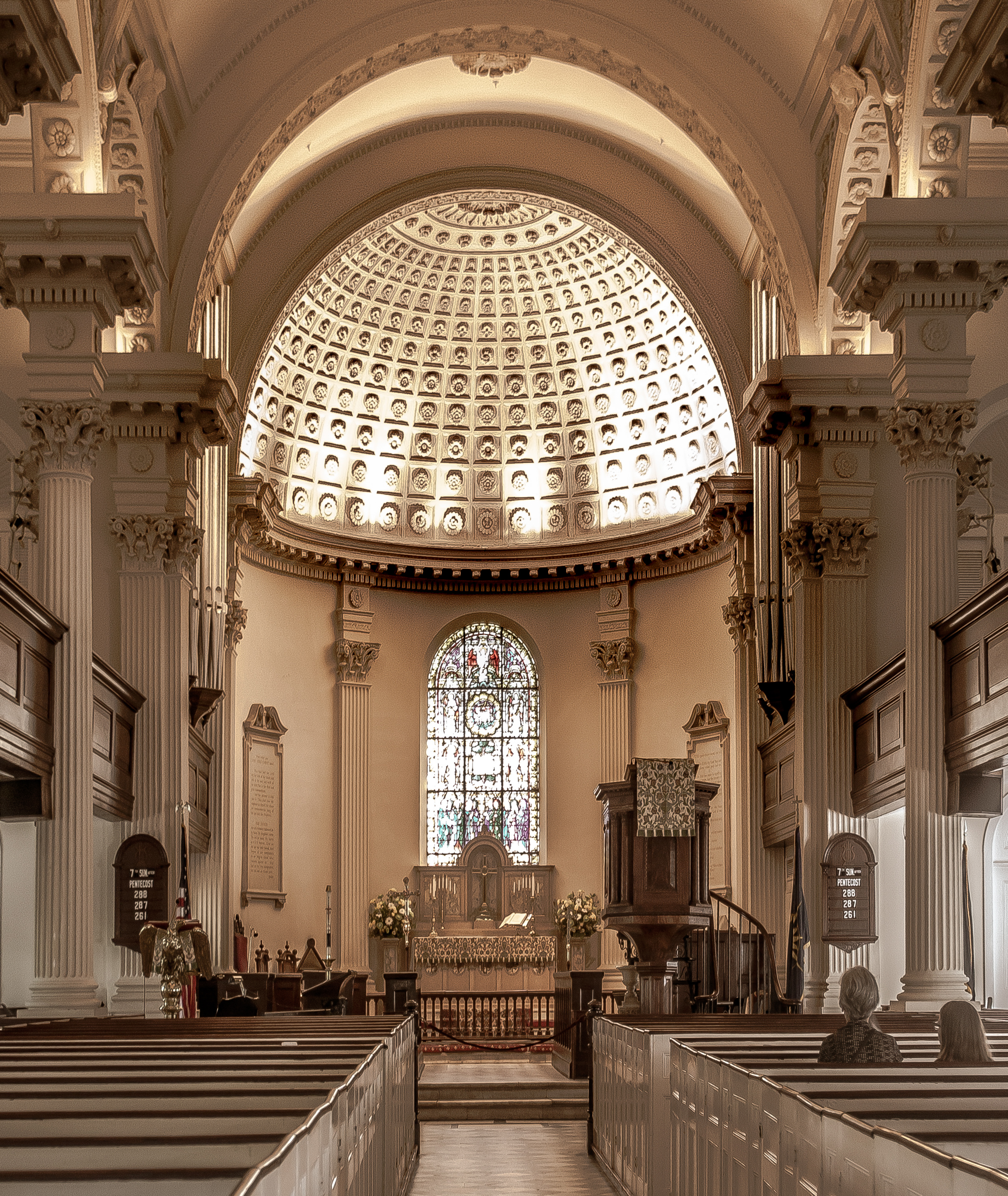
The interior of the church

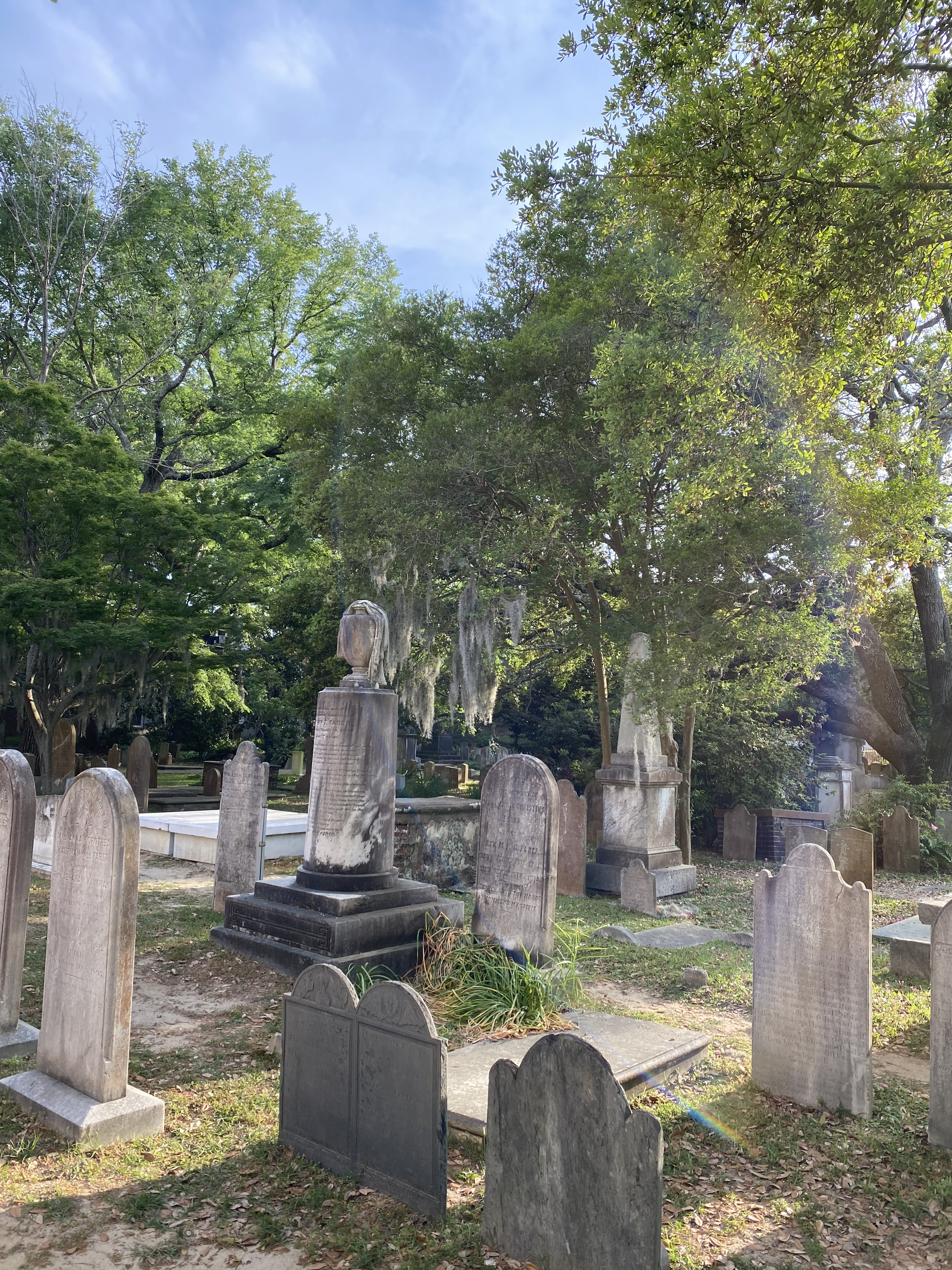
The West Graveyard of St. Philip's Church

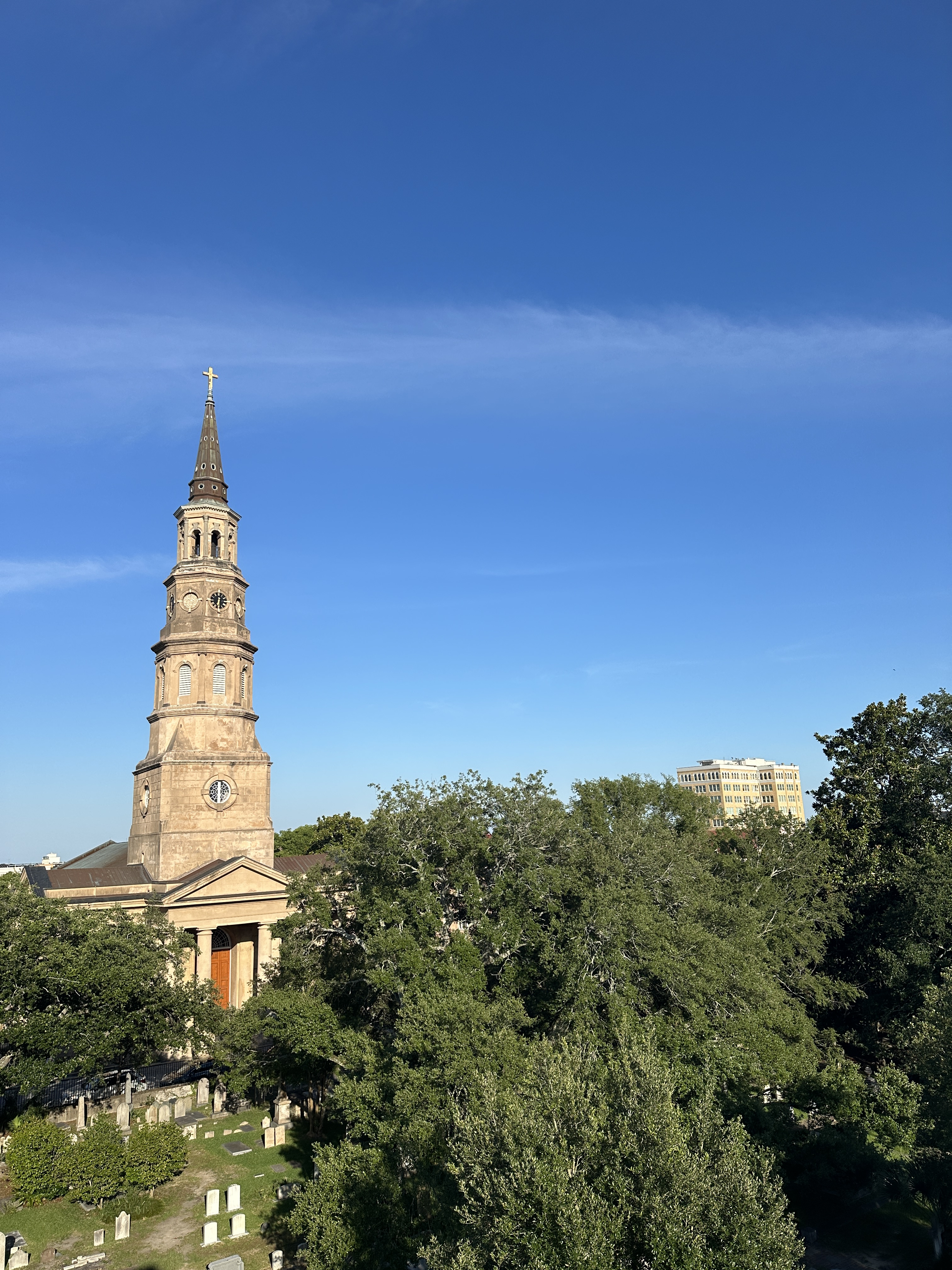
Graveyard in proximity to Church

== Notable burials ==
Notable burials in the church graveyard include:

- John C. Calhoun, seventh vice-President of the United States.
- Captain John Christie, 60th OR Royal American Regiment, and Founder and First Worshipful Master of Lodge No. 1 at Detroit, Michigan.
- Judith DuBose, colonial heiress
- Christopher Gadsden, a signer of the Continental Association.
- Judith Smith Ladson, colonial society figure
- Charles Pinckney, US Senator, Governor of South Carolina, and a Signer of the United States Constitution.
- Edward Rutledge, Continental Congressman and a Signer of the United States Declaration of Independence and Continental Association

== See also ==
- National Register of Historic Places listings in Charleston, South Carolina
- List of National Historic Landmarks in South Carolina
- St. Philip's Church
