= Mark Lawrence (bishop) =

American Anglican bishop (born 1950)

The Right Reverend Mark Lawrence
- Bishop of South Carolina
- Church: Anglican Church in North America
- Diocese: South Carolina
- See: Charleston
- In office: 2008–2012 (within The Episcopal Church; 2012–2014 (as bishop of the autonomous diocese); 2014–2017 (as bishop of the Global South diocese); 2017–2022 (as bishop of the Anglican Church in North America diocese)
- Predecessor: Edward Salmon
- Successor: Chip Edgar

Orders
- Consecration: 26 January 2008 (Episcopal Church) by Clifton Daniel

Personal details
- Born: March 19, 1950 (age 76) Bakersfield, California

Mark Joseph Lawrence (born March 19, 1950, in Bakersfield, California) is an American bishop. He was the bishop of the Episcopal Diocese of South Carolina from 2008 to 2012, and of the diocese now known as the Anglican Diocese of South Carolina from 2012 to 2022. In November 2012, under his leadership, a large portion of the old diocese withdrew from the national Episcopal Church to become an independent Anglican diocese. They continued to operate under the name "Episcopal Diocese of South Carolina", whose use was disputed by the national Episcopal Church. The Episcopal Church did not recognize this diocesan withdrawal, instead considering Lawrence to have abandoned the church and his position as diocesan bishop. Lawrence's diocese affiliated with the Anglican Church in North America in 2017 and in 2019 began referring to itself as the "Anglican Diocese of South Carolina".

According to the official website of the global Anglican Communion, the independent diocese under Lawrence's leadership is not a member of the communion. However, the steering committee of the Anglican Global South recognized Lawrence as bishop over a diocese "within the Anglican Communion" in December 2012 and recognized the diocese as part of the Anglican Global South in August 2014. Such disagreements over Anglican Communion membership have sometimes arisen in churches undergoing Anglican realignment. The status of the Anglican Diocese of South Carolina has been the subject of multiple state and federal lawsuits, some of which are still ongoing.

== Personal life ==
Lawrence has been married to Allison Kathleen Taylor since 1973. They have five children, some of whom are themselves involved in the ministry. Son Chadwick was an Episcopal priest. Daughter Adelia is married to Stephen Matson, who is serving as Family Ministries director in Grove City, PA. Son Joseph is a current humanities teacher in Beaufort, South Carolina. Daughter Chelsea is married to Jason Hamshaw, rector at All Saints’ Anglican Church in Florence, South Carolina. Daughter Emily is a photographer and is married to Jacob Jefferis. Lawrence has 19 grandchildren.

== Studies ==
Lawrence has a Bachelor of Arts degree from the California State University in Bakersfield (1976) and a Master of Divinity degree from Trinity Episcopal School for Ministry in Ambridge, Pennsylvania (1980). He also has honorary degrees from Nashotah House (2008) and Sewanee (2009).

== Ministry ==
Lawrence was born in Bakersfield, California, on March 19, 1950. A fifth generation Californian, he was educated at California State University, Bakersfield (BA, 1976) and Trinity Episcopal School for Ministry (M. Div. 1980). He has also received honorary degrees from Nashotah House (D.D. 2008) and Sewanee (D.D. 2009). He has ministered in a wide variety of parish settings from suburban church plant, rural mission, inner city church, to downtown parish in California and Pennsylvania. These include Holy Family, Fresno, California; Saint Mark’s, Shafter, California (1981-1984); Saint Stephen’s, McKeesport, Pennsylvania (1984-1997) where he also established on Mon Valley Tri-Church Ministry taking two smaller congregations under a multi-staff network; and Saint Paul’s, Bakersfield, California (1997-2007). Known for being a dedicated pastor-teacher, Lawrence also served, among many other capacities, the Commission on Ministry, the Standing Committee, the Board of Examining Chaplains, and rural dean. He also served as a deputy to the General Conventions of 2003 and 2006. He has published articles on devotional and ecclesial concerns in various periodicals.

Lawrence was known as a theological conservative in the Episcopal Church. He was consecrated as the diocesan bishop of the Episcopal Diocese of South Carolina on January 26, 2008, after a second election. He had first been elected in 2006, but did not gain approval to take office. His second election was approved following his reassurances that he would keep the diocese within the Episcopal Church.

As bishop, Lawrence opposed all liberal policies of the Episcopal Church, such as acceptance of gay people, until the final rupture took place on October 18, 2012, when the Episcopal Church found him guilty of abandoning the church and renouncing its order. On November 17, 2012, a special convention of his departing diocese took place. The convention affirmed disaffiliation from the Episcopal Church and amended the diocesan constitution and canons to remove all references to the Episcopal Church. These actions were deemed ultra vires by the Episcopal Church and are currently the subject of ongoing lawsuits.

Lawrence attended the general assembly of the Anglican Church in North America in June 2013, where he was one of the speakers.

Religious titles
| Preceded by Edward L. Salmon Jr. | XIV Bishop of South Carolina (TEC); 2008–2012 | Succeeded by Charles vonRosenberg (provisional) |
| Preceded by Edward L. Salmon Jr. | XIV Bishop of South Carolina (ACNA); 2017–2022 | Succeeded by Chip Edgar |
