= Anglican Diocese of South Carolina =

Anglican diocese in the United States

Coordinates: 32.7868°N 79.9400°W

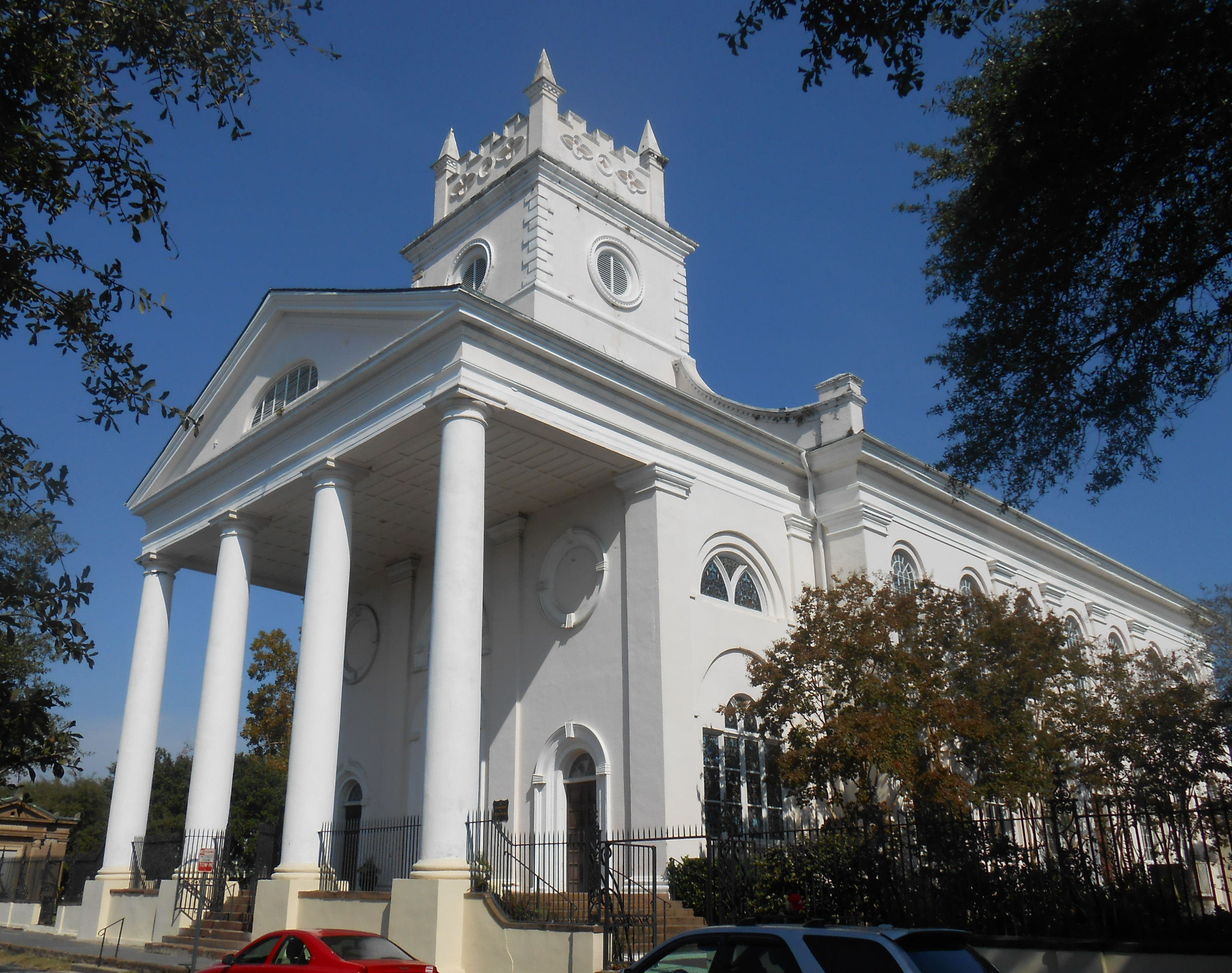
- Cathedral of St. Luke and St. Paul

Location
- Ecclesiastical province: Anglican Church in North America

Statistics
- Congregations: 53 (2025)
- Members: 16,037 (2025)

Information
- Rite: Anglican
- Cathedral: Cathedral of St. Luke and St. Paul, Charleston

Current leadership
- Bishop: Chip Edgar

Website
- adosc.org

The Anglican Diocese of South Carolina (ADOSC) is a diocese of the Anglican Church in North America (ACNA). The diocese covers an area of 24 counties in the eastern part of the state of South Carolina. In 2019, it had 17,195 baptized members and 47 parishes. The see city is Charleston, home to the Cathedral of St. Luke and St. Paul.

The Anglican Diocese formed in 2012 when the historical Episcopal Diocese of South Carolina (EDOSC) split into two groups after a long period of conflict over theology and authority within the Episcopal Church. Bishop Mark Lawrence and a majority of the members of the historical diocese left the Episcopal Church but continued to claim diocesan property, including church buildings, and to be the continuation of the historical diocese. The Anglican Diocese of South Carolina joined the ACNA in 2017.

A minority of the members of the historical diocese remained affiliated to the Episcopal Church and called themselves the Episcopal Church in South Carolina. This group also claimed the right to the name and property of the historical diocese, including the property of 36 parishes who left. On April 20, 2022, the South Carolina Supreme Court ruled that 22 of the 36 parishes would keep their property. However, the court ruled that the other 14 parishes and the St. Christopher Camp and Conference Center were the property of the Episcopal Church in South Carolina and must be returned.

On September 19, 2019, a federal court ruled that the trademarks and names "Episcopal Diocese of South Carolina" and "Diocese of South Carolina" were owned by the Episcopal Church and its affiliates in the state. Following this decision, the Anglican Diocese of South Carolina adopted its current name. In 2022, a final ruling of the South Carolina Supreme Court awarded eight parish properties from the ADOSC to the EDOSC, and the two dioceses agreed to settle all remaining litigation over diocesan property, names and seals, with the EDOSC retaining the name, seal and most of the property.

== History ==
=== Establishment (2012–2013) ===
With tensions growing between the historical diocese and the larger Episcopal Church, that diocese's standing committee passed two corporate resolutions on October 2, 2012. The resolutions were designed to conditionally disaffiliate the diocese from the Episcopal Church and also call for a special diocesan convention. These resolutions were to take effect if the larger church took disciplinary action against Bishop Lawrence or other diocesan leadership. Bishop Lawrence was notified on October 15, 2012, by the Presiding Bishop that on September 18 the Disciplinary Board for Bishops had certified his abandonment of the Episcopal Church, thus ostensibly triggering the two resolutions passed earlier.

The special convention was held in Charleston at St. Philip’s Church on November 17, 2012. The convention voted to affirm the disassociation and amend the diocesan constitution and canons to remove all references to the Episcopal Church. The Diocese of South Carolina was the fifth diocese voting to leave the Episcopal Church in a trend known as Anglican realignment. The diocese's actions were supported by the steering committee of the primates of the Global South of the Anglican Communion and by the Fellowship of Confessing Anglicans. The steering committee also recognized Lawrence as a bishop over a diocese "within the Anglican Communion."

In contrast, the Episcopal Church denied the legitimacy of these actions, stating that its canon law does not allow a diocese to unilaterally withdraw from the Episcopal Church. The church re-organized leadership for its continuing diocese of parishes that wanted to remain within the Episcopal Church. On January 26, 2013, that continuing diocese held a special convention to elect Charles G. vonRosenberg, retired Bishop of East Tennessee, its provisional bishop. The Episcopal diocese was known by the name "Episcopal Church in South Carolina" during a 2013-2019 legal dispute over the rights to use the name "Episcopal Diocese of South Carolina."

=== Joining ACNA (2014–2017) ===
At its annual convention in March 2014, the diocese voted to join the global Fellowship of Confessing Anglicans. It also voted to accept temporary "primatial oversight" from Anglican Communion bishops in the Global South, an action which Bishop Lawrence stated brought it "an extra-provincial diocesan status, gracious oversight from one of the largest ecclesial entities within the Communion." According to the Anglican Communion's official website, the Anglican Diocese of South Carolina is not part of the Anglican Communion and does not have extra-provincial status.

The diocese held a two-day meeting in April 2015 at St. Christopher Camp and Conference Center examining "possible compatibility" with the Anglican Church in North America (ACNA). An "Affiliation Task Force" recommended affiliation with the ACNA at the diocesan convention on March 12, 2016. The affiliation would have to be approved by two future conventions of the diocese.

The Anglican Diocese of South Carolina voted unanimously to affiliate with ACNA at their annual Convention, held in Summerville, on 11 March 2017. ACNA's Provincial Council voted unanimously to formally receive the Anglican Diocese of South Carolina at ACNA's Third Provincial Assembly, meeting in Wheaton, Illinois, on 27 June 2017.

=== Litigation (2013–2022) ===
After leaving the Episcopal Church, the diocese sued to retain ownership of more than $500 million in church properties, the 314-acre St. Christopher Camp, and the Diocese of South Carolina name and registered trademarks. On February 3, 2015, a South Carolina Circuit Court judge ruled that the Anglican diocese was entitled to the property and the historical name.

The Episcopal Church appealed, and the South Carolina Supreme Court issued a complicated decision on August 2, 2017. Each of the five justices wrote separate opinions. Two justices would have returned all property in dispute to the Episcopal Church. Two justices would have upheld the 2015 ruling. The Dennis Canon (a 1979 Episcopal Church bylaw requiring parishes to keep property in trust for the national church) was an important element in the case. The court found that seven parishes never consented to the Dennis Canon and would be allowed to keep their property. The other 29 parishes were determined to belong to the Episcopal Church. The court split on the issue of who owned the name Diocese of South Carolina, leaving that portion of the 2015 decision in place.

First Circuit Judge Edgar W. Dickson was assigned to implement the 2017 decision. On June 19, 2020, he ruled that the 29 parishes could also keep their property, and the Anglican diocese retained ownership of St. Christopher Camp. In his clarification of the multiple Supreme Court opinions, Dickson explained, "the Dennis Canon by itself does not create a legally cognizable trust, nor does it transfer title to property". The case was appealed, and the state Supreme Court issued its final ruling on April 20, 2022. It examined each of the 29 parishes individually to determine if they expressly agreed to the Dennis Canon. It found that 14 parishes did agree to the Dennis Canon and must return their property to the Episcopal Church. The other 15 parishes never agreed to Dennis Canon and keep their property. The court ruled that diocesan property belonged to the Episcopal Church. On August 17, 2022, the Supreme Court ruled on rehearing that an additional 6 Anglican congregations could keep their property. This ruling left eight parish properties set to be returned to EDOSC: St. John's Episcopal Church on Johns Island, Christ Church in Mount Pleasant, St. David's Episcopal Church in Cheraw, Holy Trinity Episcopal Church in Charleston; St. Bartholomew's Episcopal Church in Hartsville; St. James Episcopal Church in James Island, St. Matthew's Episcopal Church in Fort Motte, and Good Shepherd Episcopal Church in Charleston. (In October 2022, without a critical mass of Episcopalians to restart a congregation, Woodliff-Stanley agreed to sell St. Matthew's Episcopal Church to the ADOSC congregation.)

The state Supreme Court declined to rule on the ownership of diocesan trademarks, leaving the matter to be resolved in federal court. As of 2022, the district court had ruled in the Episcopal diocese's favor, but an appeal was pending in the 4th Circuit.

=== Conclusion of litigation (2022) ===
Chip Edgar, who had been consecrated as the ADOSC's new bishop succeeding Lawrence in 2022, began mediation with EDOSC Bishop Ruth Woodliff-Stanley, who had been consecrated in 2021, to discuss a resolution to the disputes between the dioceses in spring 2022. On September 26, 2022, Edgar and Woodliff-Stanley jointly announced a settlement between the dioceses. While the settlement did not affect remaining issues regarding the property rights of three parishes still pending before the state Supreme Court or a betterments lawsuit by several parishes pending in state trial court, "it does resolve all remaining issues regarding diocesan properties." As part of the settlement, St. Christopher Camp and Conference Center on Seabrook Island was transferred from the ADOSC to the EDOSC on October 1, 2022. Under the settlement, the ADOSC also transferred the bishop's residence in Charleston, additional diocesan-owned real property in Charleston and Santee. The EDOSC waived claims to the ADOSC's leasehold interest in the diocesan headquarters. Historical papers in ADOSC possession will be made available for copying by both dioceses and then donated to the South Carolina Historical Society or another mutually agreed nonprofit; similarly, historical silver in ADOSC without a claim by a parish will be donated to the Charleston Museum or another mutually agreed nonprofit. Bishops' portraits in the possession of ADOSC will be copied and then transferred to EDOSC.

Both the ADOSC and the EDOSC agreed to provide quitclaim deeds to ADOSC church plants whose properties were not subject to orders in the litigation. They also agreed to dismiss pending litigation in federal court over diocesan names and seals, leaving the EDOSC as the owner of the historical name and seal. “This settlement agreement allows us to invest our diocesan energy, time, focus, and resources in gospel ministry rather than litigation," Edgar commented. "While the losses we have experienced, including those of St. Christopher and several of our parish buildings are painful, I am grateful that the work we have done has brought an end to litigation between our dioceses."

== Bishops ==
These are the bishops who served the Anglican Diocese of South Carolina since 2012:

1. Mark Lawrence (2012–2022)
2. Chip Edgar (2022–present)

== Parishes ==
The Diocese of South Carolina reported 53 congregations in 2025 with 16,037 members (down 10% from 2022) and 8,133 in average Sunday attendance (down 3% from 2022). Notable parishes in the Anglican Diocese of South Carolina include:

Church	Image	City	Year founded	Year completed	Notes
St. Philip's Episcopal Church (Charleston, South Carolina)		Charleston	1681	1836	Oldest Anglican congregation south of Virginia
Old St. Andrew's Parish Church		Charleston	1706	1706	Oldest church building in South Carolina; oldest church building in the Anglican Church in North America.
St. James Church		Goose Creek	1706	1719	
Parish Church of St. Helena		Beaufort	1712	1724	
Prince George Winyah Parish Church		Georgetown	1721	1747	
Church of the Redeemer		Orangeburg	1749	1855	
St. Michael's Anglican Church		Charleston	1751	1761	Oldest church building in downtown Charleston
Trinity Church		Edisto	1770	1876	
Church of the Holy Cross		Stateburg	1788	1852	
Cathedral of St. Luke and St. Paul		Charleston	1810	1815	Diocesan cathedral
Church of the Holy Trinity		Grahamville	1824	1858	
Church of the Cross		Bluffton	1842	1857	
Christ Church		Florence	1843	1859	
Church of the Holy Apostles		Barnwell	1848	1857	

== See also ==
- Anglican realignment
- List of bishops of the Anglican Church in North America
- St. Michael's Episcopal Church (Charleston, South Carolina)
- SC Anglican Cursillo
