= George D. Young III =

American bishop

The Right Reverend George D. Young III
- Bishop of East Tennessee
- Church: Episcopal Church
- Diocese: East Tennessee
- Elected: February 12, 2011
- In office: 2011–2017
- Predecessor: Charles G. vonRosenberg
- Successor: Brian Lee Cole

Orders
- Ordination: 1990 by Frank S. Cerveny
- Consecration: June 25, 2011 by Katharine Jefferts Schori

Personal details
- Born: September 28, 1955 (age 71) Jacksonville, Florida, United States
- Denomination: Anglican
- Spouse: Kathryn Mary Beich
- Children: 2
- Education: Florida State University

George Dibrell Young III (born September 28, 1955) was the fourth bishop of the Episcopal Diocese of East Tennessee from 2011 until 2017.

== Bibliography ==
Young was born on September 28, 1955, in Jacksonville, Florida. He studied at the Florida State University and graduated with a Bachelor of Science in 1978. In 1981 he married the now-Reverend Kathryn Mary Young (nee Beich) and together had two children. He then enrolled at Seabury-Western Theological Seminary, from which he graduated with a Master of Divinity in 1990.

Young was made deacon and ordained priest in 1990 by the Bishop of Florida, Frank S. Cerveny. He then became assistant at St. Giles' Church in Northbrook, Illinois, and director of religious education. In 1994 he returned to Florida and became rector of St. Elizabeth's Church in Jacksonville, Florida. In 1997, he became rector of St Peter’s Church in Fernandina Beach, Florida, where he remained until 2011.

On February 12, 2011, Young was elected as the fourth Bishop of East Tennessee and was consecrated on June 25, 2011, with Presiding Bishop Katharine Jefferts Schori as chief consecrator at the Church of the Ascension in Knoxville, Tennessee. He was installed at St John’s Cathedral, Knoxville, Tennessee, the next day, on June 26, 2011. He retired in December 2017.

== See also ==
- List of Episcopal bishops of the United States
- Historical list of the Episcopal bishops of the United States

Episcopal Church (USA) titles
Preceded by Charles vonRosenberg	4th Bishop of East Tennessee; 2011–2017	Succeeded by Brian Lee Cole
