= Robert Tharp =

American Episcopalian bishop

The Right Reverend Robert Gould Tharp D.D.
- Bishop of East Tennessee
- Church: Episcopal Church
- Diocese: East Tennessee
- Elected: November 17, 1990
- In office: 1992–1999
- Predecessor: William Evan Sanders
- Successor: Charles G. vonRosenberg
- Other post: Assisting Bishop of Atlanta
- Previous post: Coadjutor Bishop of East Tennessee (1991-1992)

Orders
- Ordination: January 9, 1957 by William F. Moses
- Consecration: May 4, 1991 by Edmond L. Browning

Personal details
- Born: October 25, 1928 Orlando, Florida, United States
- Died: May 30, 2003 (aged 74)
- Buried: St. John's Cathedral (Knoxville, Tennessee)
- Denomination: Anglican
- Spouse: Ann Hampton "Bug" Bradford (1934-2023)
- Children: 2
- Education: Wesleyan University

Robert Gould Tharp (October 25, 1928 – May 30, 2003) was an American bishop. He was the second bishop of East Tennessee in the Episcopal Church from 1992 till 1999. Bishop Tharp Business and Technology Institute in Les Cayes, Haiti, is named for him.

== Early life and education ==
Tharp was born on October 25, 1928, in Orlando, Florida. He studied at Wesleyan University and graduated with a Bachelor of Arts in 1950. He also served in the U.S. Army. Later he studied at the Seabury-Western Theological Seminary and graduated with a Master of Divinity in 1956.

== Ordained ministry ==
Tharp was ordained deacon in 1956 and priest on January 9, 1957. In 1956 he became curate at St. Mary’s Church in Tampa, Florida, while on August 1, 1958, he became curate at St. Philip's Church in Coral Gables, Florida. Later he became rector of the Church of the Good Shepherd in Maitland, Florida, and then rector of St James' Church in Ormond Beach, Florida, a post he retained until 1968. In 1968 he took a sabbatical to study at King's College London in England. Upon his return to the United States in 1969, he become rector of St Peter’s Church in Columbia, Tennessee. In 1978 he left St. Peter's and became canon to the ordinary (assistant to the bishop) of the Diocese of Tennessee, a post he carried with him when Bishop Sanders of Tennessee became Bishop of East Tennessee in 1985.

== Episcopacy ==
On November 17, 1990, Tharp was elected Coadjutor Bishop of East Tennessee during a special meeting of the sixth annual convention of the diocese. He was consecrated on May 4, 1991 with Presiding Bishop Edmond L. Browning as chief consecrator. He succeeded as diocesan bishop on January 1, 1992, and retired in February 1999. After retirement he served as chairman of the board of directors for Episcopal Relief & Development and Assistant Bishop of Atlanta. Tharp died on May 30, 2003.

Episcopal Church (USA) titles
Preceded by William Evan Sanders	2nd Bishop of East Tennessee; 1992–1999	Succeeded by Charles vonRosenberg
