= List of the Episcopal cathedrals of the United States =

The dioceses of the Episcopal Church in the United States are grouped into nine provinces, the first eight of which, for the most part, correspond to regions of the United States. Province IX is composed of dioceses in Latin America. The see city usually has a cathedral, often the oldest parish in that city, but some dioceses do not have a cathedral. The dioceses of Iowa and Minnesota each have two cathedrals. The Diocese of Wisconsin has three cathedrals. This list of the Episcopal Church cathedrals includes those in the United States and its territories.

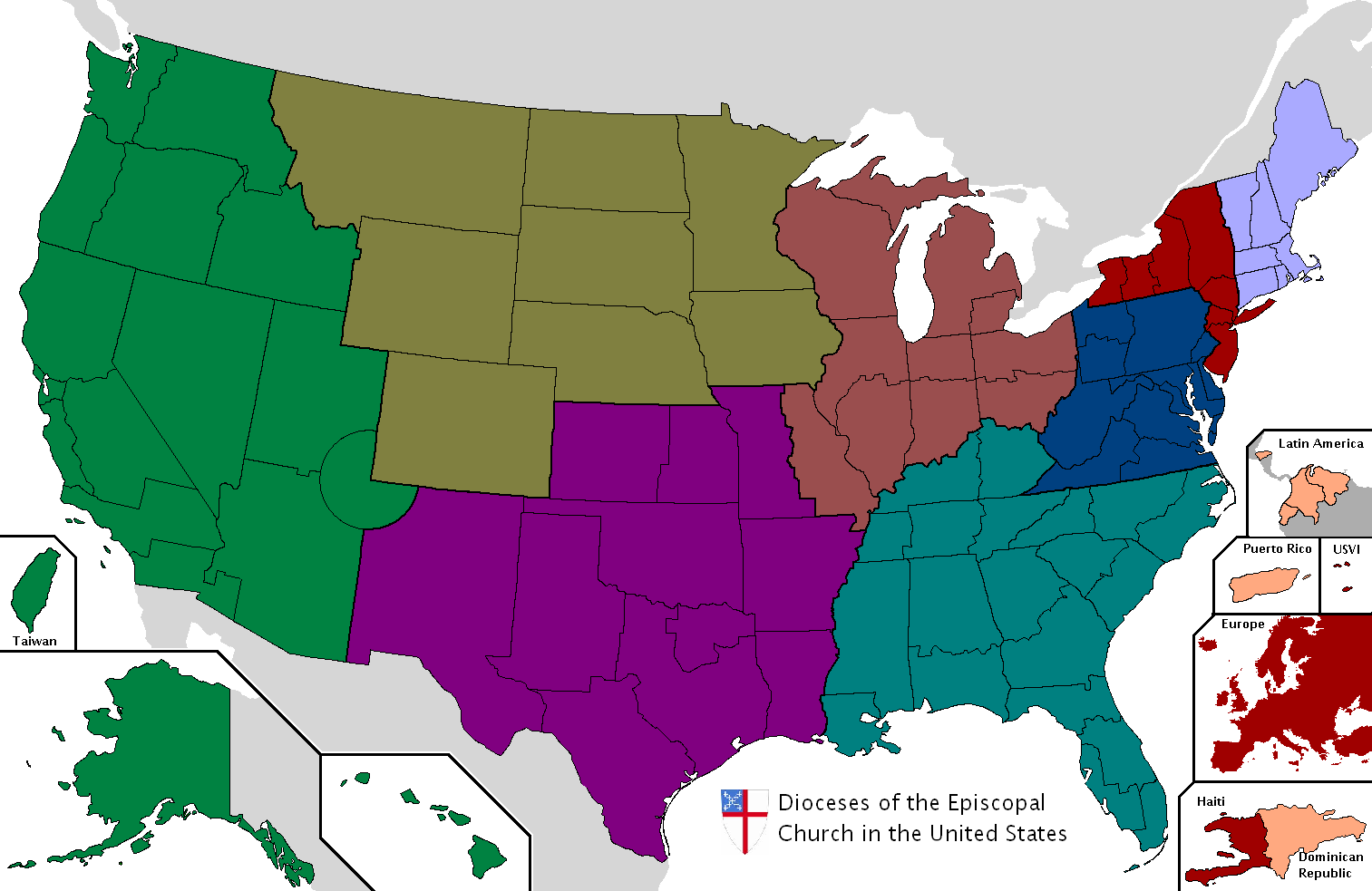
Map of dioceses of the Episcopal Church, colored by province: Province I Province II Province III / Province IV Province V Province VI / Province VII Province VIII Province IX

== Provinces, Dioceses and Cathedral ==
Province	Diocese	Diocese map	Image	Cathedral
Province I	Diocese of Connecticut			Christ Church Cathedral (Hartford)
Province I	Diocese of Maine			Cathedral Church of St. Luke (Portland)
Province I	Diocese of Massachusetts			Cathedral Church of St. Paul (Boston)
Province I	Diocese of New Hampshire			No cathedral
Province I	Diocese of Rhode Island			No cathedral
Province I	Diocese of Vermont			Cathedral Church of St. Paul (Burlington)
Province I	Diocese of Western Massachusetts			Christ Church Cathedral (Springfield)
Province II	Diocese of Albany			Cathedral of All Saints (Albany)
Province II	Diocese of Central New York			Saint Paul's Cathedral (Syracuse)
Province II	Diocese of Long Island			Cathedral of the Incarnation (Garden City)
Province II	Diocese of New Jersey			Trinity Cathedral (Trenton)
Province II	Diocese of New York			Cathedral of St. John the Divine (New York City)
Province II	Diocese of Newark			Trinity & St. Philip's Cathedral (Newark)
Province II	Diocese of Puerto Rico			Catedral San Juan Bautista (San Juan)
Province II	Diocese of Rochester			No cathedral
Province II	Diocese of the Virgin Islands			Cathedral Church of All Saints (Charlotte Amalie)
Province II	Diocese of Western New York			St. Paul's Cathedral (Buffalo)
Province III	Diocese of the Susquehanna			Cathedral Church of the Nativity (Bethlehem)
Province III	Diocese of the Susquehanna			St. Stephen's Cathedral (Harrisburg)
Province III	Diocese of Delaware			No cathedral
Province III	Diocese of Easton			Trinity Cathedral (Easton)
Province III	Diocese of Maryland			Cathedral of the Incarnation (Baltimore)
Province III	Diocese of Northwestern Pennsylvania			Cathedral of St. Paul (Erie)
Province III	Diocese of Pennsylvania			Philadelphia Episcopal Cathedral (Philadelphia)
Province III	Diocese of Pittsburgh			Trinity Cathedral (Pittsburgh)
Province III	Diocese of Southern Virginia			No cathedral
Province III	Diocese of Southwestern Virginia			No cathedral
Province III	Diocese of Virginia			Cathedral Shrine of the Transfiguration (Orkney Springs)
Province III	Diocese of Washington			Washington National Cathedral (Washington, D.C.)
Province III	Diocese of West Virginia			No cathedral
Province IV	Diocese of Alabama			Cathedral Church of the Advent (Birmingham)
Province IV	Diocese of Atlanta			Cathedral of Saint Philip (Atlanta)
Province IV	Diocese of Central Florida			Cathedral Church of St. Luke (Orlando)
Province IV	Diocese of the Central Gulf Coast			Christ Church Cathedral (Mobile)
Province IV	Diocese of East Carolina			No cathedral
Province IV	Diocese of East Tennessee			St. John's Cathedral (Knoxville)
Province IV	Diocese of Florida			St. John's Cathedral (Jacksonville)
Province IV	Diocese of Georgia			No cathedral
Province IV	Diocese of Kentucky			Christ Church Cathedral (Louisville)
Province IV	Diocese of Lexington			Christ Church Cathedral (Lexington)
Province IV	Diocese of Louisiana			Christ Church Cathedral (New Orleans)
Province IV	Diocese of Mississippi			St. Andrew's Cathedral (Jackson)
Province IV	Diocese of North Carolina			No cathedral
Province IV	Diocese of South Carolina			Grace Church Cathedral (Charleston)
Province IV	Diocese of Southeast Florida			Trinity Cathedral (Miami)
Province IV	Diocese of Southwest Florida			Cathedral Church of St. Peter (St. Petersburg)
Province IV	Diocese of Tennessee			Christ Church Cathedral (Nashville)
Province IV	Diocese of Upper South Carolina			Trinity Cathedral (Columbia)
Province IV	Diocese of West Tennessee			St. Mary's Cathedral (Memphis)
Province IV	Diocese of Western North Carolina			Cathedral of All Souls (Asheville)
Province V	Diocese of Chicago			St. James Cathedral (Chicago)
Province V	Diocese of the Great Lakes			No cathedral
Province V	Diocese of Indianapolis			Christ Church Cathedral (Indianapolis)
Province V	Diocese of Michigan			Cathedral Church of St. Paul (Detroit)
Province V	Diocese of Missouri			Christ Church Cathedral (St. Louis)
Province V	Diocese of Northern Indiana			Cathedral of St. James (South Bend)
Province V	Diocese of Northern Michigan			No cathedral
Province V	Diocese of Ohio			Trinity Cathedral (Cleveland)
Province V	Diocese of Southern Ohio			Christ Church Cathedral (Cincinnati)
Province V	Diocese of Springfield			Cathedral Church of Saint Paul the Apostle (Springfield)
Province V	Diocese of Wisconsin			Christ Church Cathedral (Eau Claire)
Province V	Diocese of Wisconsin			St. Paul's Cathedral (Fond du Lac)
Province V	Diocese of Wisconsin			All Saints Cathedral (Milwaukee)
Province VI	Diocese of Colorado			Cathedral of St. John in the Wilderness (Denver)
Province VI	Diocese of Iowa			Cathedral Church of Saint Paul (Des Moines)
Province VI	Diocese of Iowa			Trinity Cathedral (Davenport)
Province VI	Diocese of Minnesota			Cathedral of Our Merciful Saviour (Faribault)
Province VI	Diocese of Minnesota			St. Mark's Episcopal Cathedral (Minneapolis)
Province VI	Diocese of Montana			St. Peter's Cathedral (Helena)
Province VI	Diocese of Nebraska			Trinity Cathedral (Omaha)
Province VI	Diocese of North Dakota			Gethsemane Cathedral (Fargo)
Province VI	Diocese of South Dakota			Calvary Cathedral (Sioux Falls)
Province VI	Diocese of Wyoming			St. Matthew's Cathedral (Laramie)
Province VII	Diocese of Arkansas			Trinity Cathedral (Little Rock)
Province VII	Diocese of Dallas			Cathedral Church of Saint Matthew (Dallas)
Province VII	Diocese of Kansas			Grace Cathedral (Topeka)
Province VII	Diocese of Northwest Texas			No cathedral
Province VII	Diocese of Oklahoma			St. Paul's Cathedral (Oklahoma City)
Province VII	Diocese of the Rio Grande			Cathedral Church of St. John (Albuquerque)
Province VII	Diocese of Texas			Christ Church Cathedral (Houston)
Province VII	Diocese of West Missouri			Grace and Holy Trinity Cathedral (Kansas City)
Province VII	Diocese of West Texas			No cathedral
Province VII	Diocese of Western Kansas			Christ Cathedral (Salina)
Province VII	Diocese of Western Louisiana			St. Mark's Cathedral (Shreveport)
Province VIII	Diocese of Alaska			No cathedral
Province VIII	Diocese of Arizona			Trinity Cathedral (Phoenix)
Province VIII	Diocese of California			Grace Cathedral (San Francisco)
Province VIII	Diocese of Eastern Oregon			No cathedral
Province VIII	Diocese of El Camino Real			Trinity Cathedral (San Jose)
Province VIII	Diocese of Hawaii			Cathedral Church of Saint Andrew (Honolulu)
Province VIII	Diocese of Idaho			St. Michael's Cathedral (Boise)
Province VIII	Diocese of Los Angeles			St. John's Cathedral (Los Angeles)
Province VIII	Diocese of Navajoland			No cathedral
Province VIII	Diocese of Nevada			Trinity Episcopal Cathedral (Reno)
Province VIII	Diocese of Northern California			Trinity Cathedral (Sacramento)
Province VIII	Diocese of Olympia			St. Mark's Cathedral (Seattle)
Province VIII	Diocese of Oregon			Trinity Cathedral (Portland)
Province VIII	Diocese of San Diego			St. Paul's Cathedral (San Diego)
Province VIII	Diocese of San Joaquin			St. James' Cathedral (Fresno)
Province VIII	Diocese of Spokane			Cathedral of St. John the Evangelist (Spokane)
Province VIII	Diocese of Utah			St. Mark's Cathedral (Salt Lake City)

== See also ==
- List of Episcopal bishops of the United States
