= St. Mary's Episcopal Cathedral =

St. Mary's Episcopal Cathedral can refer to

- St. Mary's Cathedral, Glasgow
- St Mary's Cathedral, Edinburgh (Episcopal)
- St. Mary's Episcopal Cathedral (Memphis, Tennessee)
