= William Evan Sanders =

American Anglican bishop (1919–2021)

The Right Reverend William Evan Sanders
- Bishop of East Tennessee
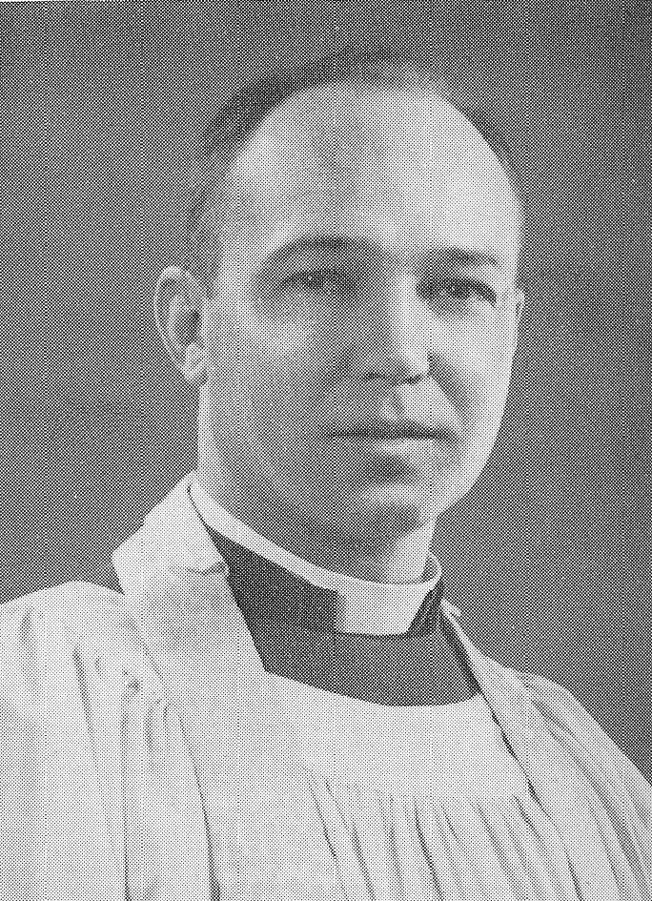
- Sanders circa 1958
- Church: Episcopal Church
- Diocese: East Tennessee
- In office: 1985–1992
- Successor: Robert Tharp
- Previous posts: Coadjutor Bishop of Tennessee (1962–1977); Bishop of Tennessee (1977–1985)

Orders
- Ordination: June 11, 1946 by James M. Maxon
- Consecration: April 4, 1962 by Arthur C. Lichtenberger

Personal details
- Born: December 25, 1919 Natchez, Mississippi, U.S.
- Died: November 18, 2021 (aged 101) Nashville, Tennessee, U.S.
- Denomination: Anglican
- Parents: Walter Richard Sanders, Agnes Mortimer Jones
- Spouse: Kathryn Cowan Schaffer (m. 1951); Marlin Jones Phythyon (m. 2005)
- Children: 4
- Education: Vanderbilt University

William Evan Sanders (December 25, 1919 – November 18, 2021) was an American Episcopalian bishop. He was the eighth bishop of the Episcopal Diocese of Tennessee from 1977 to 1985, and first bishop of the Episcopal Diocese of East Tennessee from 1985 to 1992. He was consecrated to the episcopate on April 4, 1962.

== Early life and education ==
Sanders was born on December 25, 1919, in Natchez, Mississippi, the son of Walter Richard Sanders and Agnes Mortimer Jones. His brother was B. Sidney Sanders, Bishop of East Carolina. He grew up in Nashville, Tennessee and was educated at Nashville High School. He studied at Vanderbilt University and graduated with a Bachelor of Arts degree in 1942. He then studied for a Bachelor of Divinity degree at Sewanee: The University of the South from where he graduated in 1945. He also earned a Master of Sacred Theology degree from Union Theological Seminary. He was also awarded an honorary Doctor of Divinity degree from the University of the South in 1959.

== Ordained ministry ==
Sanders was ordained deacon in February 1945 and priest on June 11, 1946, on both occasions by Bishop James M. Maxon of Tennessee, at the Church of the Advent, Nashville, Tennessee. Initially, he served as deacon at St. Paul's Church in Chattanooga, Tennessee, and later as assistant priest at the Cathedral of St. Mary in Memphis, Tennessee. On December 23, 1946, he was appointed acting dean of the Cathedral of St. Mary, and a year later, was confirmed as dean, a post he retained until 1962.

== Bishop ==
On April 4, 1962, Sanders was consecrated Coadjutor Bishop of Tennessee, at St. Mary's Cathedral, Memphis, with Presiding Bishop Arthur C. Lichtenberger as chief consecrator. During an illness of the diocesan bishop, John Vander Horst, in 1973, Sanders became the de facto acting bishop for about a year.

Upon his accession to the diocesan position after the retirement of Vander Horst in 1977, the diocese had, for about ten years by that point, been functioning with three bishops stationed in the largest cities of the state, with each one serving the churches in the western, middle, and eastern parts of Tennessee respectively. Sanders set up offices in Knoxville, while Vander Horst operated out of a rented space in Nashville. Meanwhile, a suffragan bishop, W. Fred Gates Jr., was consecrated in part to man the (old statewide) office in Memphis. The diocese divided, permission for which was given by the General Convention in 1982. First, the Diocese of West Tennessee came into being in 1983 and consecrated a new bishop, and then, two years later, the Diocese of East Tennessee began. Sanders chose to become bishop of the new East Tennessee diocese, and assumed that office on January 1, 1985. He retired on January 1, 1992.

== Personal life and death ==
Sanders was married twice, firstly to Kathryn Cowan Schaffer in 1951 and then to Marlin Jones Phythyon in 2005. He had four children from his first marriage.

Sanders died at his home in Nashville, Tennessee, on November 18, 2021, at the age of 101.

Episcopal Church (USA) titles
| New title | 1st Bishop of East Tennessee; 1985–1992 | Succeeded by Robert Tharp |
