= St. Mary's Episcopal Cathedral (Memphis, Tennessee) =

Historic church in Tennessee, United States

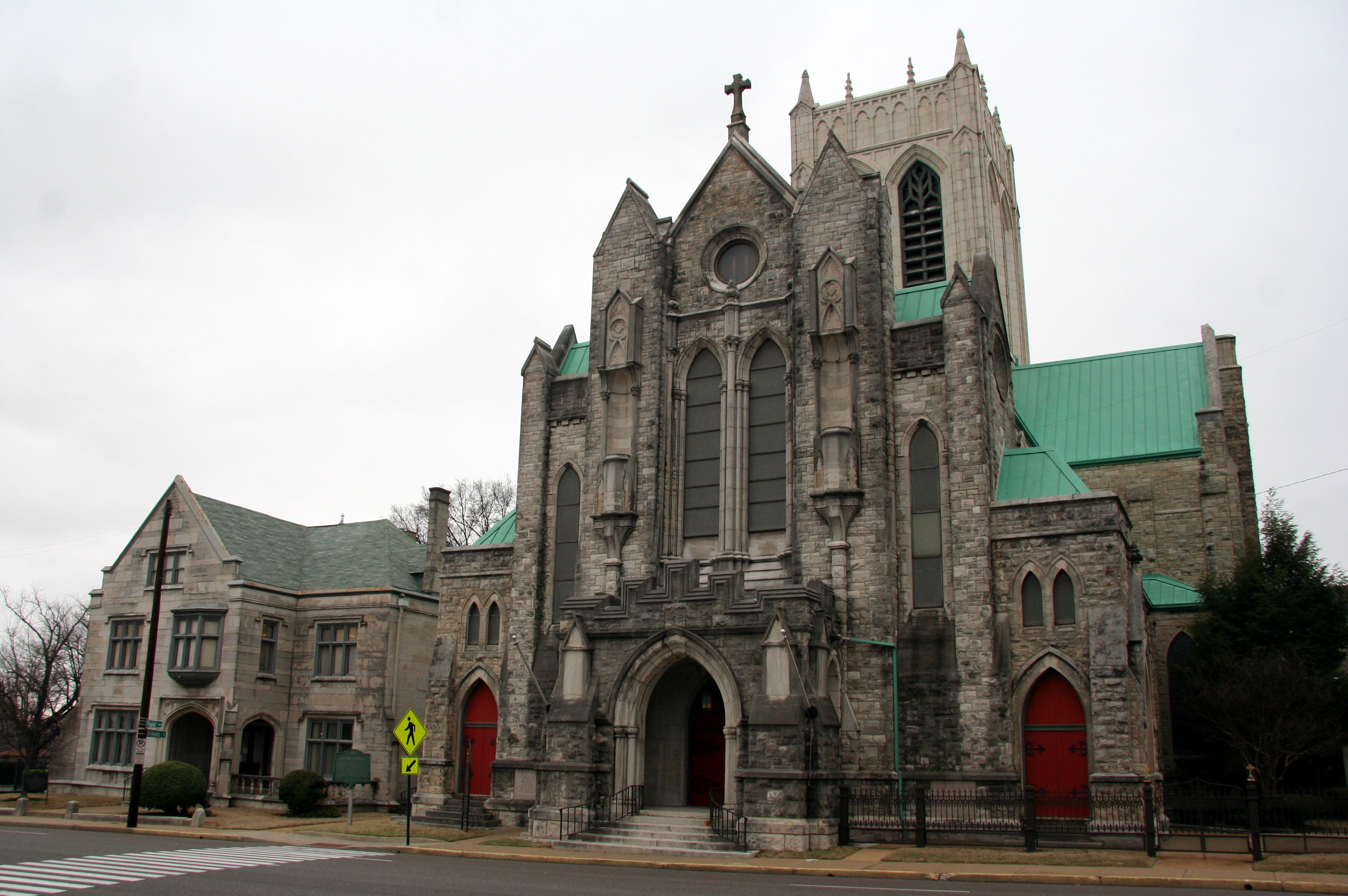
- Diocesan House, Cathedral, Sisters' Chapel

- Location within Tennessee
- 35°8′48.2″N 90°2′12.56″W
- Location: 700 Poplar Avenue; Memphis, Tennessee
- Country: United States
- Denomination: Episcopal
- Website: stmarysmemphis.org

History
- Status: Cathedral
- Founded: 1858 (parish)
- Consecrated: 1871

Architecture
- Functional status: Active
- Architect(s): William Halsey Wood (original plans), L. M. Weathers, and Bayard Snowden Cairns
- Style: Late Gothic Revival (Early English period)
- Completed: 1858 (original); 1888 (chapel); 1898 (crypt); 1907 (west front and nave); 1926 (tower, transepts, chancel)

Administration
- Province: IV (Southeast)
- Diocese: West Tennessee

Clergy
- Bishop: Phoebe A. Roaf
- Vicar: Dr. Noah Campbell

St. Mary's Episcopal Cathedral, designed by Memphis architect Bayard Snowden Cairns, located near downtown Memphis, Tennessee, is the cathedral church of the Episcopal Diocese of West Tennessee and the former cathedral of the old statewide Episcopal Diocese of Tennessee.

In 2020, the cathedral reported 727 members. In 2025, it reported 177 members Average Sunday Attendance (ASA) reported by the cathedral in 2025 was 87 persons. This was a relative decrease from ASA of 264 persons reported in 2018. Plate and pledge financial support reported by the cathedral in 2025 was $396,296.

== History ==
St. Mary's was founded as a "North Memphis" mission chapel by the Ladies' Educational and Missionary Society of Calvary Church (the city's first Episcopal parish) with oversight from Calvary's rector, Charles Quintard; Quintard later became the second bishop of the Diocese of Tennessee. Quintard led the chapel's first service on Thanksgiving Day, November 26, 1857. An item in the Memphis Appeal, dated November 29, describes the occasion:

The Mission Church on Poplar Street. This Church which has been erected by the pious zeal of the ladies belonging to the Episcopal Church of this city was organized Thanksgiving Day by the election of wardens and vestrymen. The Church is called St. Mary's, and the Reverend Richard Hines has been chosen rector. Mr. Hines has arrived in the city and will preach at St. Mary's this morning. The seats are all free, the expenses of the Church are defrayed by the offering of the congregation.

Unlike its mother church, Calvary, this new parish would not have designated family pews or charge rent for them, enabling less affluent Memphians to regularly attend Episcopal services for the first time.

St. Mary's was consecrated as a parish church on Ascension Day, May 13, 1858, by the Rt. Rev. James Hervey Otey, the first Bishop of Tennessee, with assistance from the rectors of Calvary and Grace (Memphis), St. Luke's (Jackson), St. Mary's (Covington), St. James (Bolivar), and by the new parish's own rector, Richard Hines, who would remain there until 1871.

=== First Episcopal cathedral in the South (1871) ===
Thirteen years after its founding, St. Mary's became the first Episcopal cathedral in the American South. While the 1866 Journal of the Proceedings of the Diocese of Tennessee's 34th convention and the national Episcopal Church's 1868 Journal of the General Convention both list St. Mary's as a cathedral church, the official transition from parish to "bishop's church" was January 1, 1871.

At the time, only a handful of Episcopal dioceses had adopted the English-style cathedral system, mostly in the Midwest and the western frontier, where semi-itinerant bishops required more tangible ecclesiastical bases from which to administer sparse, but expansive, new dioceses and missionary territories. While the Episcopal Church was once a part of the Church of England, the American dioceses were slow to designate official cathedrals in keeping with the Protestant or Reformed character of its members. But as the Oxford Movement's "high church" or Roman Catholic-style liturgy began to take root in the United States, Episcopal cathedrals began to appear. With a devoted high churchman as its bishop (Quintard), the Diocese of Tennessee became an early adopter of this trend.

=== Relief center during 1878 yellow fever epidemic ===
Memphis suffered periodic epidemics of yellow fever, a mosquito-borne hemorrhagic viral infection (related to dengue fever and Ebola) throughout the 19th century. The worst of the epidemics occurred in the summer of 1878, when 5,150 Memphians died and the fast-growing city lost its charter due to depopulation. Five years earlier, a group of Episcopal nuns from the recently formed Sisters of St. Mary (now the Community of St. Mary) were invited by Bishop Quintard to come to Memphis and take over operation of the St. Mary's School for Girls, now called St. Mary's Episcopal School, which had been relocated to the cathedral site.

When the 1878 epidemic struck, a number of priests and nuns (both Protestant and Catholic), physicians, and even a bordello owner, Annie Cook, stayed behind to tend to the sick and dying, despite the high risk of contracting the disease, which often resulted in a painful death. St. Mary's had become a relief center, staffed by the Sisters of St. Mary and Episcopal priests from various parishes. The nuns' superior, Sister Constance, along with three other nuns and two priests, died at the cathedral from yellow fever.

A traditional Anglican prayer memorializes the martyrs in this way:

We give thee thanks and praise, O God of compassion, for the Heroic witness of Constance and her companions, who, in a time of plague and pestilence, were steadfast in their care for the sick and the dying, and loved not their own lives, even unto death. Inspire in us a like love and commitment to those in need, following the example of our Savior Jesus Christ...

Constance and Her Companions

- Sister Constance (née Caroline Louise Darling, born Medway, Massachusetts, 1846), sister superior, headmistress of St. Mary's School for Girls.
- Sister Thecla, sacristan of St. Mary's Cathedral and its school chapel, instructor in music and grammar (English and Latin)
- Sister Ruth, nurse at Trinity Infirmary, New York
- Sister Frances, a newly professed nun given charge of the Church Home orphanage
- The Rev. Charles Carroll Parsons, rector of both Grace Church and St. Lazarus Church, Memphis; former U.S. Army artillery commander, West Point alumnus and professor; served with classmate Lt. Col. George Armstrong Custer in Kansas, defense counsel in Custer's 1867 court-martial trial.
- The Rev. Louis S. Schuyler, newly ordained assistant rector at Parsons' prior parish, Holy Innocents Episcopal Church, Hoboken, New Jersey

The Very Rev. George Harris, dean of the cathedral, survived his bout with yellow fever, as did Sister Hughetta (née Snowden). She immediately succeeded Constance as sister superior and remained head of the order's work in Tennessee until 1925.

=== "New" cathedral building, 1926 ===
Construction of its present Gothic Revival structure began in 1898 and was completed in 1926, when the parenthetical phrase "(Gailor Memorial)" was appended to the cathedral's formal name in honor of the Rt. Rev. Thomas Frank Gailor, Bishop of Tennessee and president of the National Council of the Episcopal Church.

=== Response to the assassination of Martin Luther King, Jr. ===
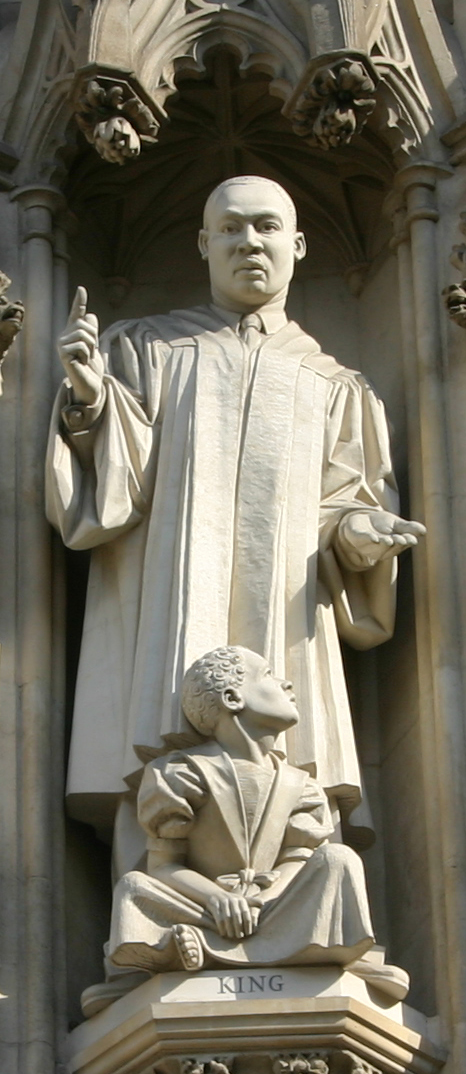
King memorial at Westminster Abbey

The second historic/tragic event that St. Mary's Cathedral attempted to mitigate was the 1968 assassination of Martin Luther King, Jr. two miles from the church. The day after King's death, Memphis clergy from many churches and synagogues met at the cathedral. In an impromptu move, Dean William Dimmick (later Bishop of Northern Michigan and co-author of certain rites in the 1979 Book of Common Prayer) took up the cathedral's processional cross and led the assembled ministers down Poplar Avenue to City Hall. They petitioned Mayor Henry C. Loeb to end the labor standoff that King was in town to help negotiate. (The sanitation workers were protesting unsafe conditions, abusive white supervisors, low wages and the city government's refusal to recognize their union). Nearly half of the cathedral's membership left during the following months, many in protest against Dimmick's gesture of racial unity.

Like Constance and her companions, King was added to the Episcopal Church's Calendar of Saints, where he is commemorated on April 4 (or, as an alternate date, January 15). Elsewhere in the Anglican Communion, King is memorialized with a statue over the western entrance of Westminster Abbey, along with nine other 20th-century martyrs.

Sisters of St. Mary at Memphis
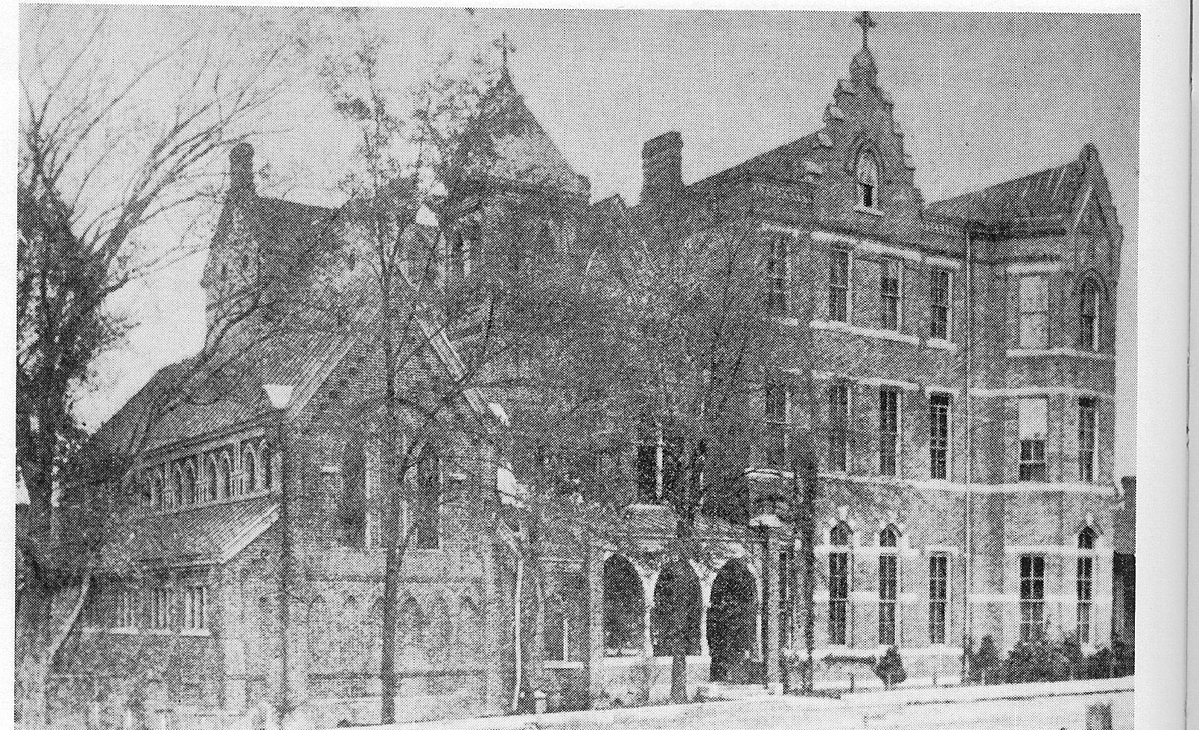
- Sisters' Chapel and St. Mary's School, 1900
- Interactive map of Sisters of St. Mary at Memphis

Monastery information
- Other names: St. Mary's School for Girls, Church Home
- Order: Community of St. Mary (Episcopal) founded in New York, NY, 1865 as the "Sisterhood of St. Mary"
- Established: 1873, at request of Bishop Charles Quintard
- Disestablished: 1910, when the sisters formally moved to St. Mary's on the Mountain Convent, Sewanee, Tennessee
- Mother house: Mount St. Gabriel Convent, Peekskill, New York
- Diocese: Episcopal Diocese of Tennessee

People
- Founders: Sister Constance, superior at Memphis; Sister Harriet, founder and mother superior, Sisterhood of St. Mary
- Important associated figures: Constance and her Companions (yellow fever martyrs listed in the Episcopal Calendar of Saints)

Site
- Location: On the close of St. Mary's Cathedral, Memphis, Tennessee
- Visible remains: Sisters' Chapel (on the cathedral close), original New York 1865 Sisters' altar (in the cathedral nave), group grave marker of yellow fever martyrs at Elmwood Cemetery
- Public access: Today, a number of St. Mary's Cathedral members (men and women, lay and ordained) are also associates of the Community of St. Mary: people who commit themselves to follow a personal "rule of life".

=== Diocese of West Tennessee ===
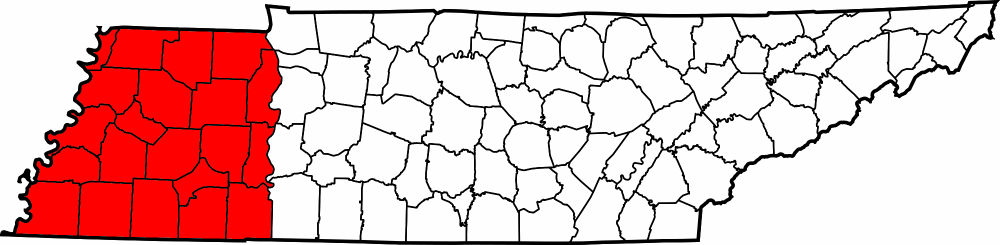
Episcopal Diocese of West Tennessee

The Episcopal Diocese of Tennessee spanned the entire state until 1982. It that year it began a partition, which had been in the planning process for about five years, based on the State of Tennessee's three Grand Divisions. The Episcopal Diocese of West Tennessee was created in 1982, with St. Mary's retained as its cathedral church. The continuing Diocese of Tennessee was again split in 1985 when the Episcopal Diocese of East Tennessee was formed.

Prior to then, in the 1960s and 1970s, the statewide diocese operated three offices with diocesan bishop John Vander Horst, coadjutor bishop William E. Sanders, and suffragan bishop W. Fred Gates, Jr. stationed in each of the three regions of the state, to serve churches throughout the state more efficiently. Gates maintained offices at the cathedral from 1966 until his 1982 retirement, which occurred shortly before the beginning of the then-new West Tennessee diocese.

Each of the three realigned dioceses retained important legacies of the old statewide body. West Tennessee had St. Mary's Cathedral. The diocese in Middle Tennessee retained the name "Diocese of Tennessee" and the status as the Episcopal Church's sixteenth diocese. The East Tennessee diocese welcomed Bishop William Evan Sanders, eighth bishop of Tennessee, as its own first bishop. (Sanders served as the dean of St. Mary's from 1947 until 1961, when he became bishop coadjutor and moved to Knoxville to help manage the statewide diocese's work in East Tennessee.)

While St. Mary's was the South's first Episcopal cathedral, Tennessee's other two cathedrals, Christ Church (Nashville) and St. John's in Knoxville are both older parishes. They were organized in 1829 with the original formation of the Diocese of Tennessee.

== Historic and contemporary images ==
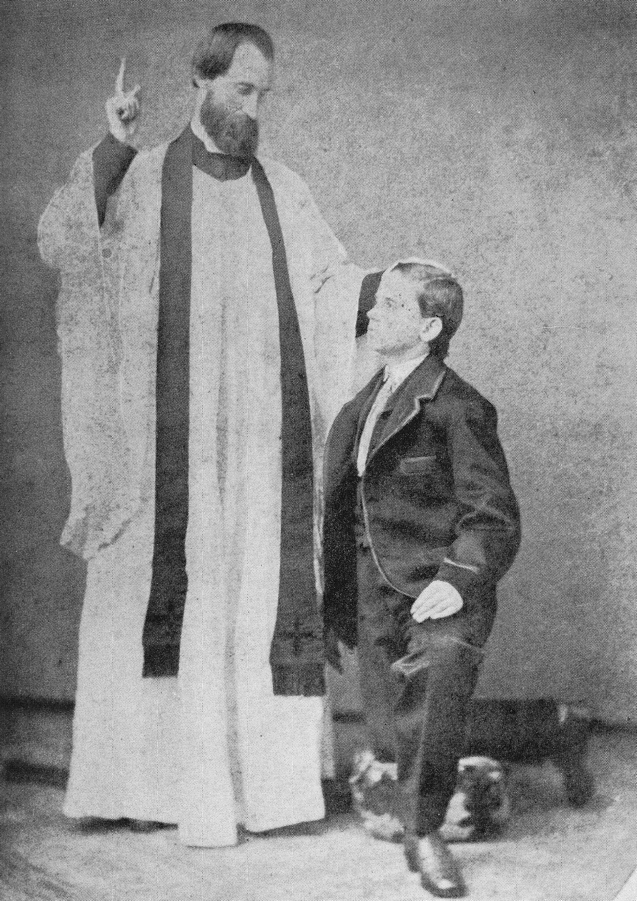
Richard Hines, first rector, 1857-1871

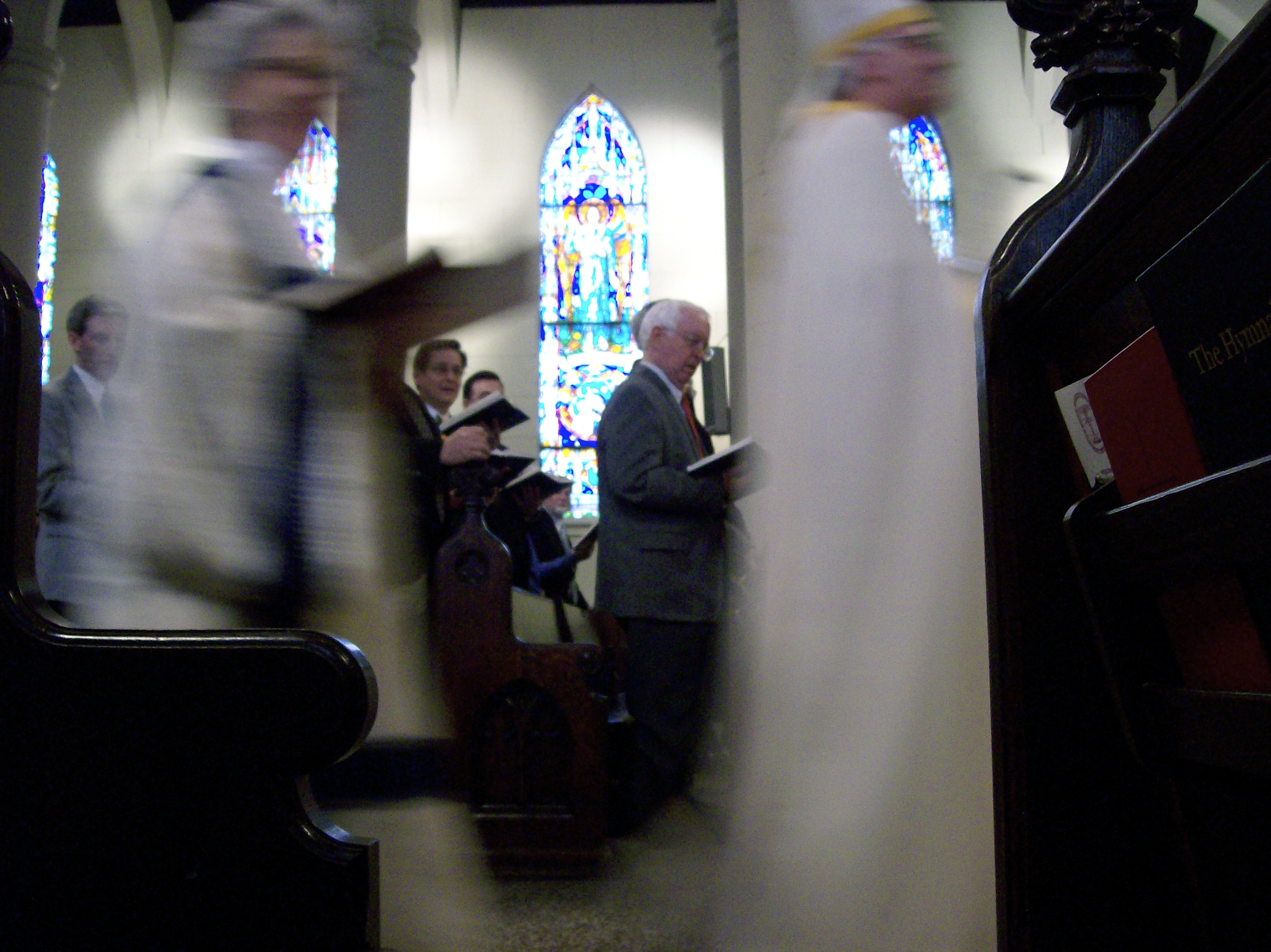
Deacon Carol Gardner and Bishop Don Johnson in Easter procession 2007

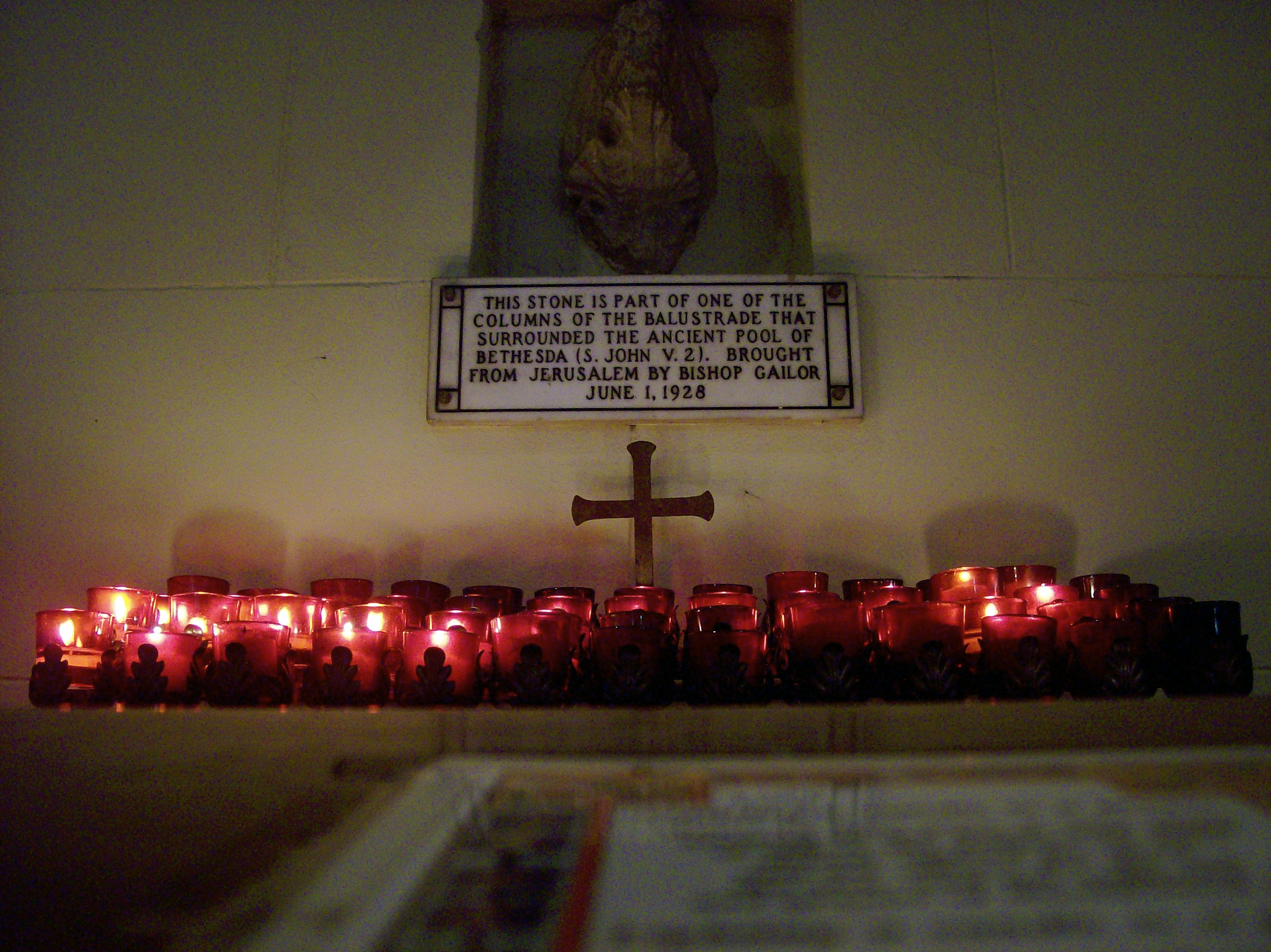
North transept: This stone is part of one of the columns of the balustrade that surrounded the ancient Pool of Bethesda. Brought from Jerusalem by Bishop Thomas F. Gailor, June 1, 1928.

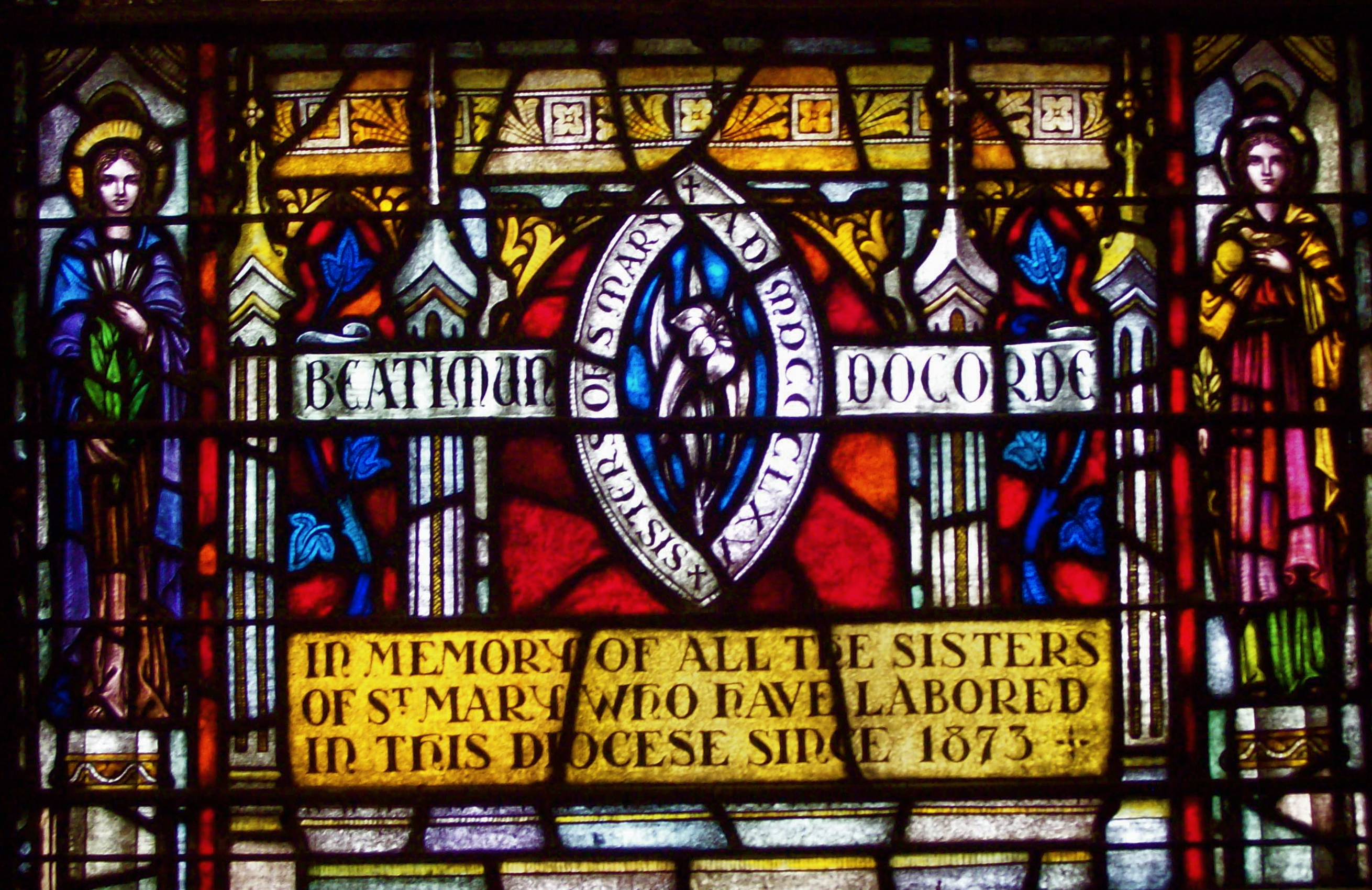
"Sisters of St. Mary Window"

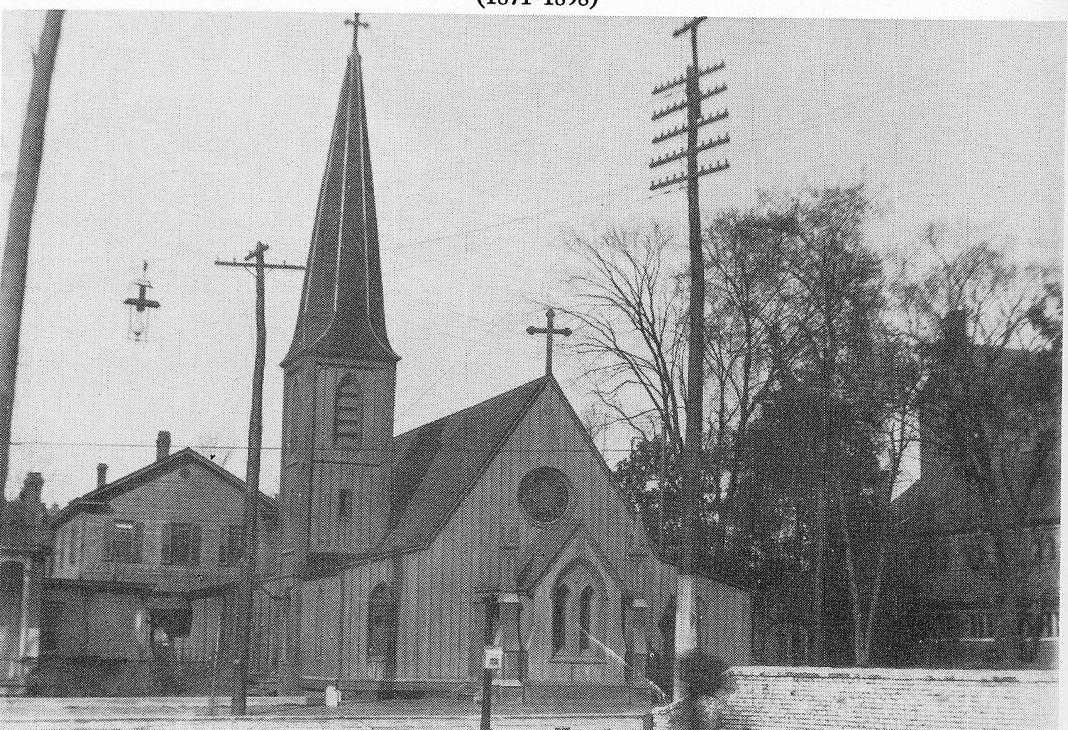
First cathedral building c. 1898

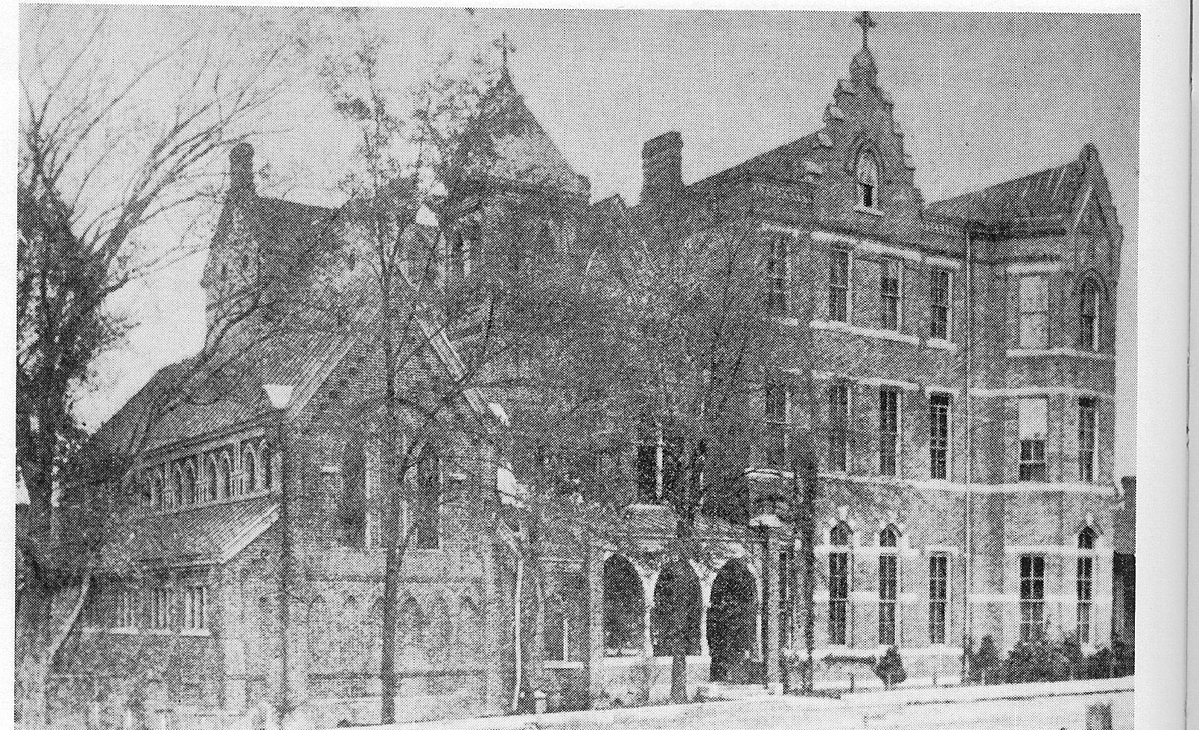
Sister's Chapel and St. Mary's School for Girls, c. 1900

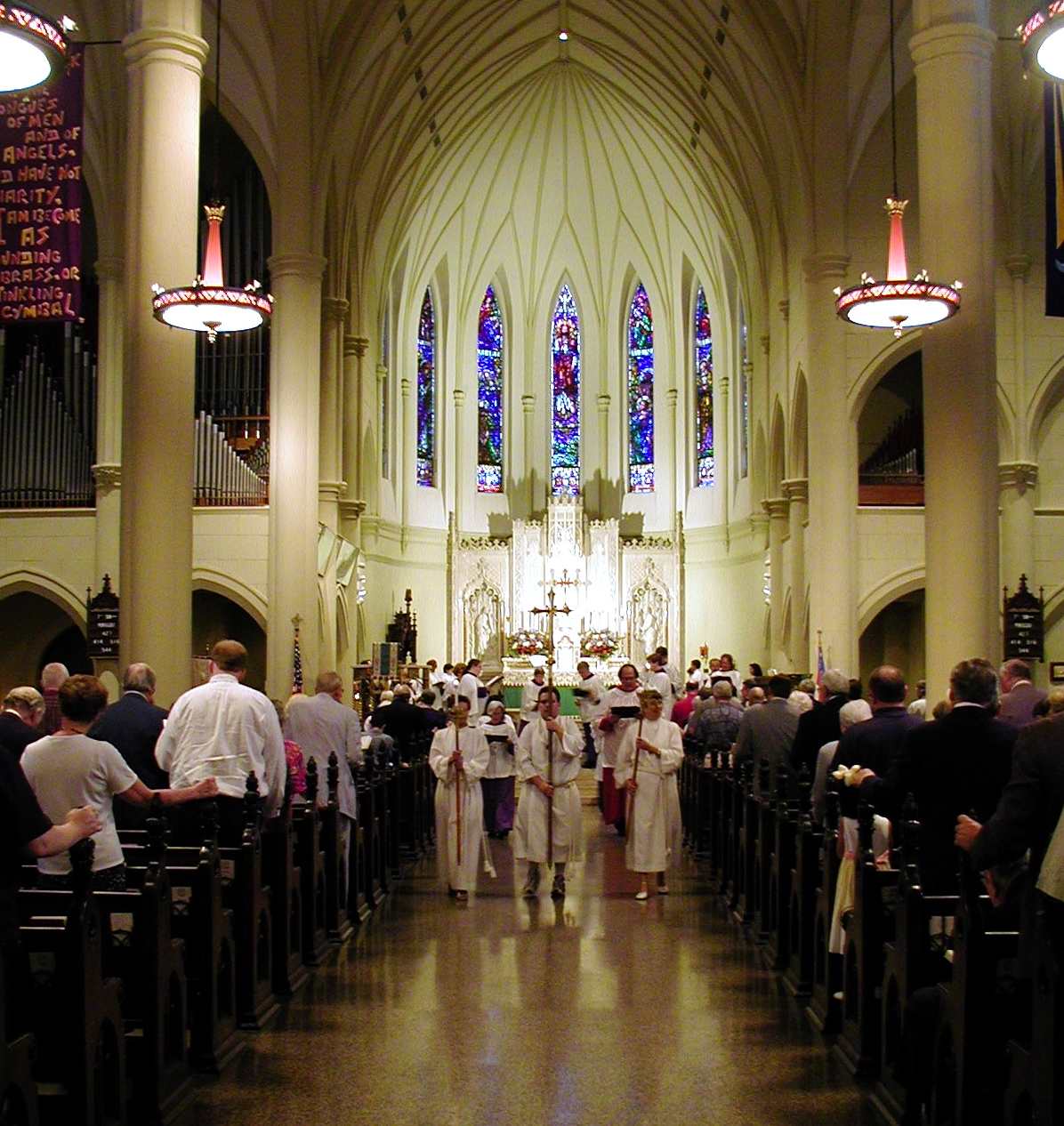
Recession exiting the chancel

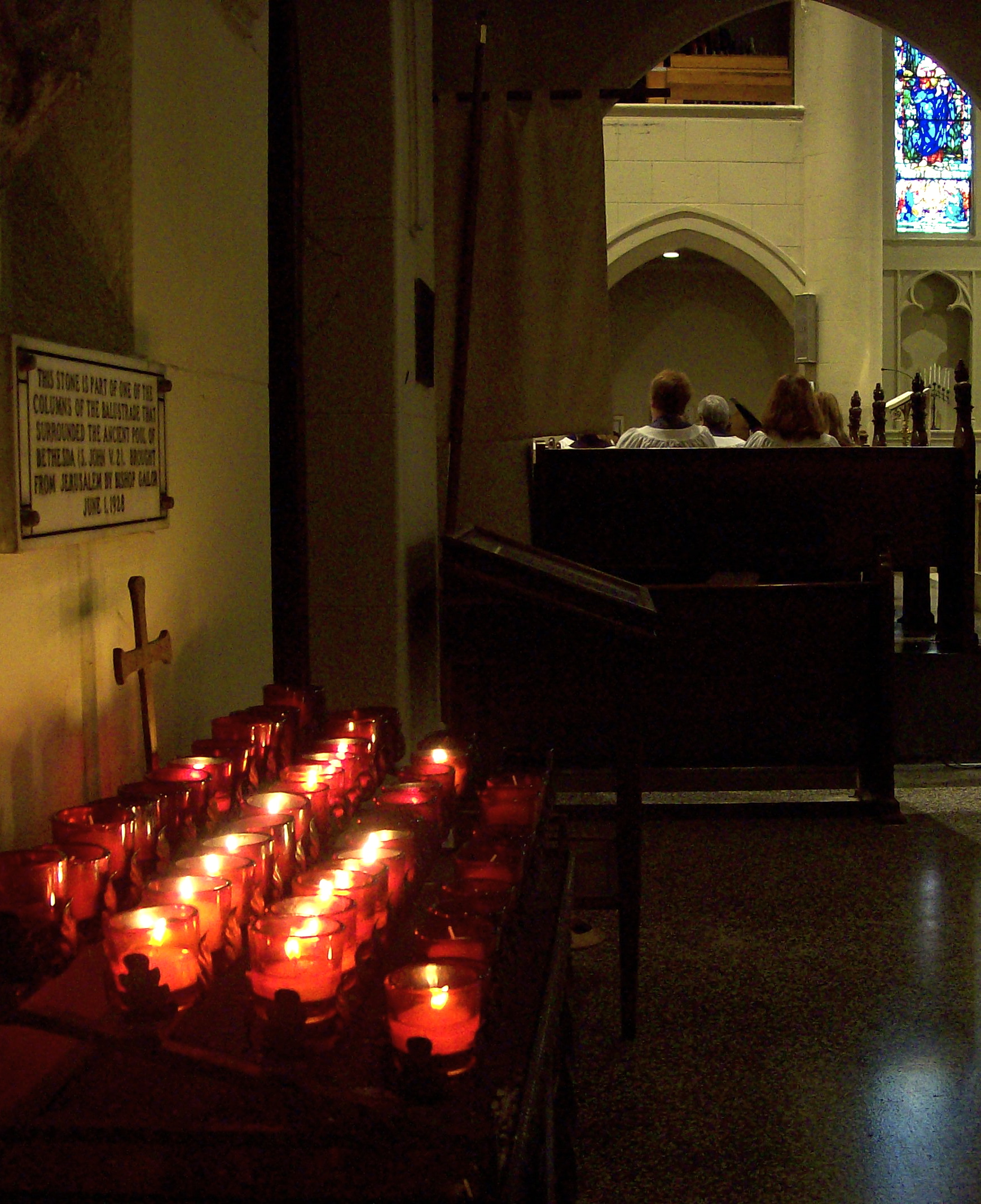
cross-section view

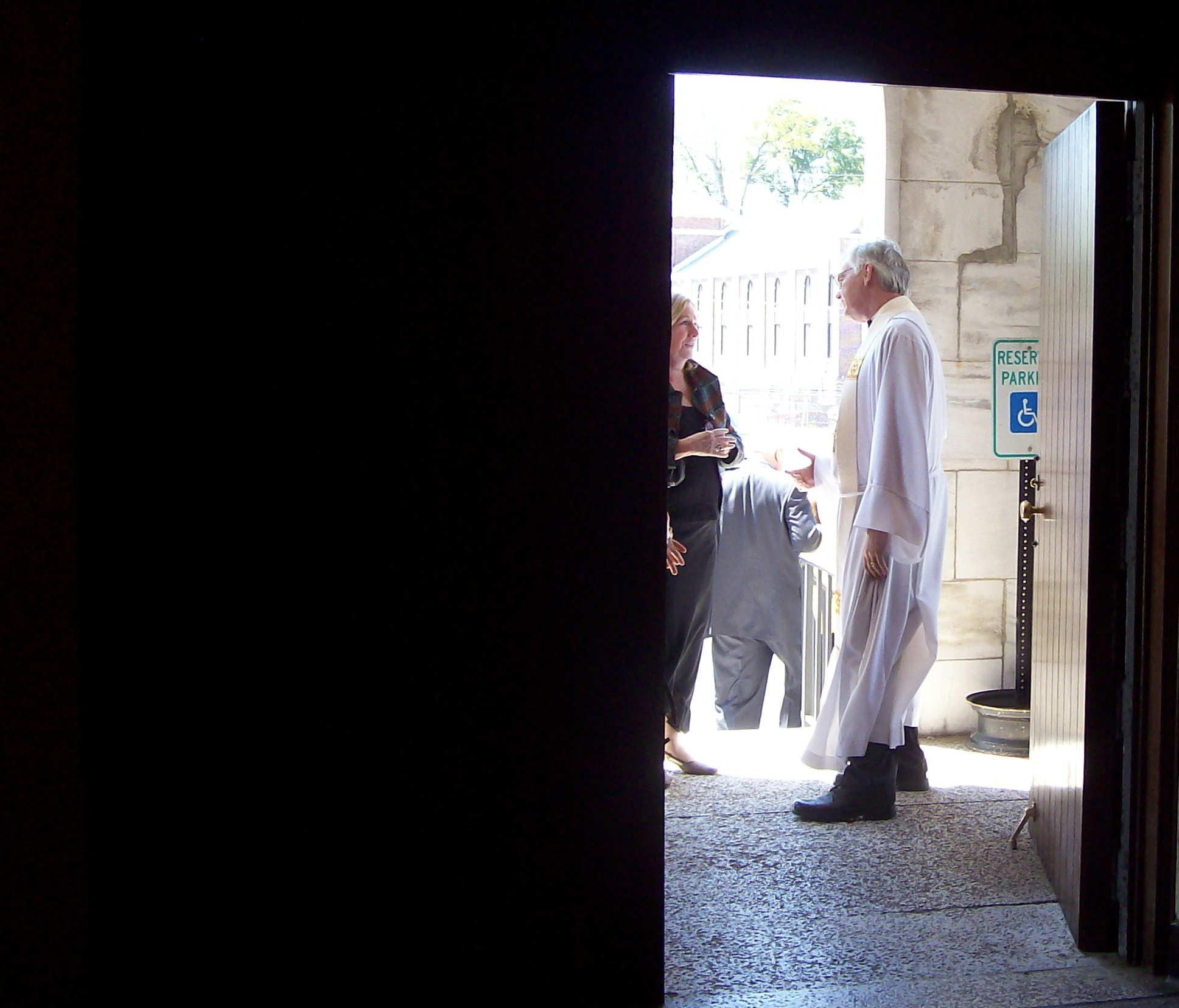
View out the West Front door

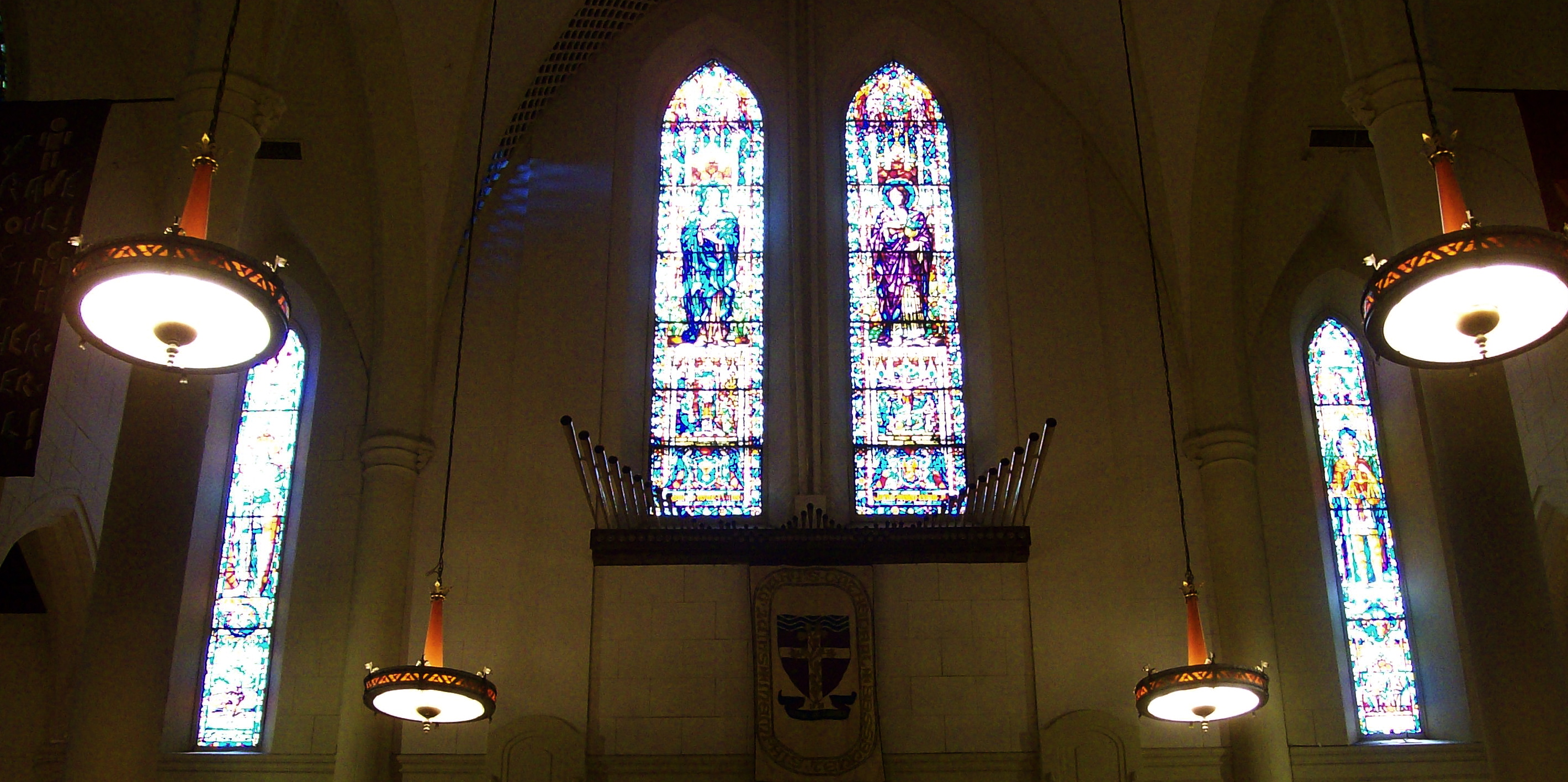
"West" front interior

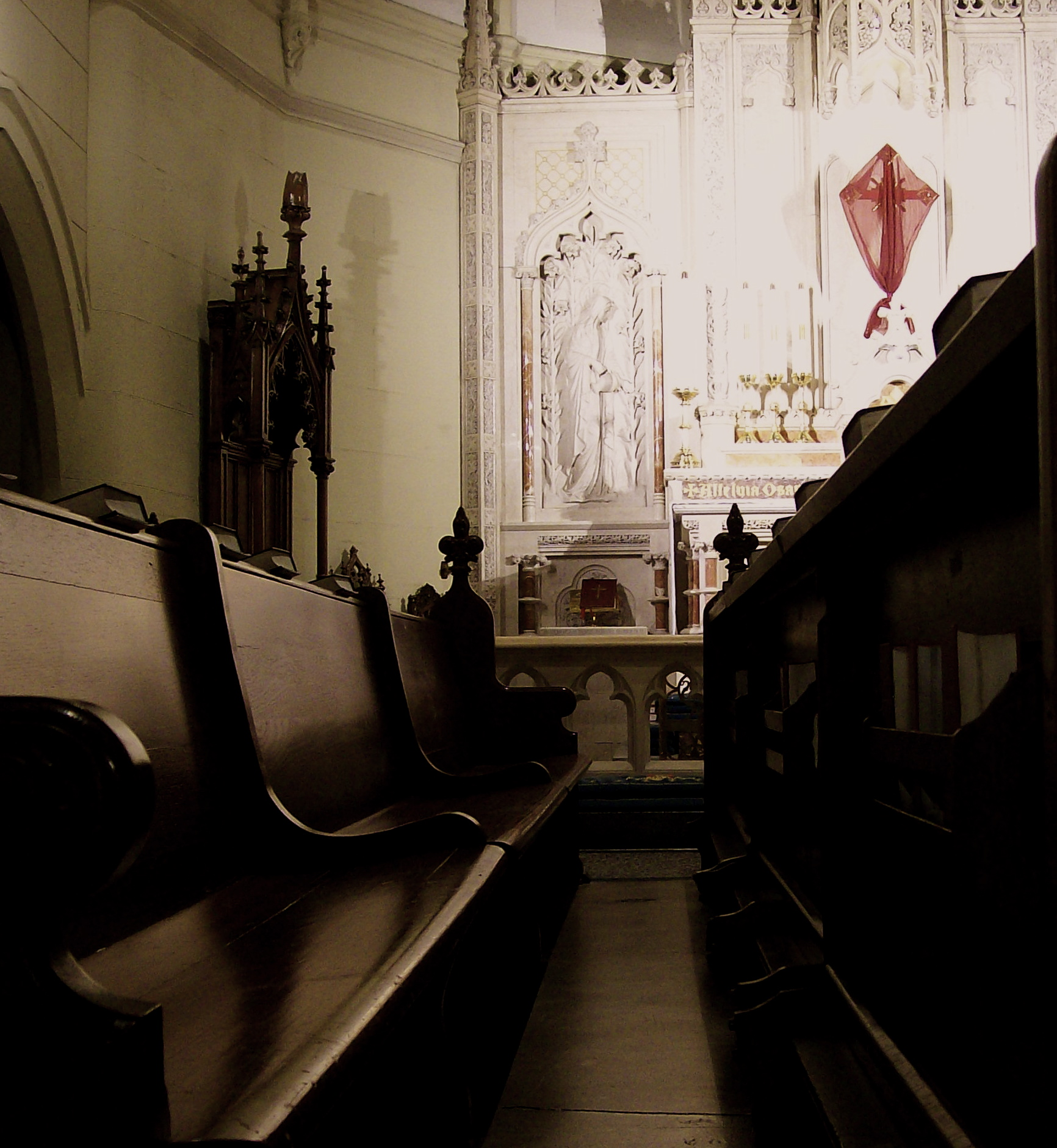
Altar with cross enshrouded for Lent

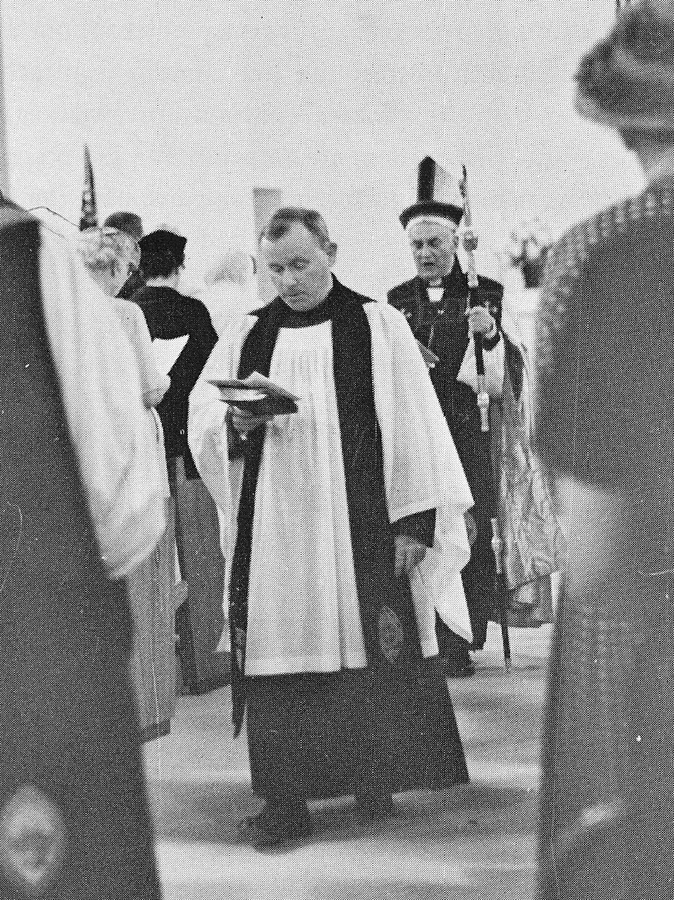
Dean William A. Dimmick, 1960

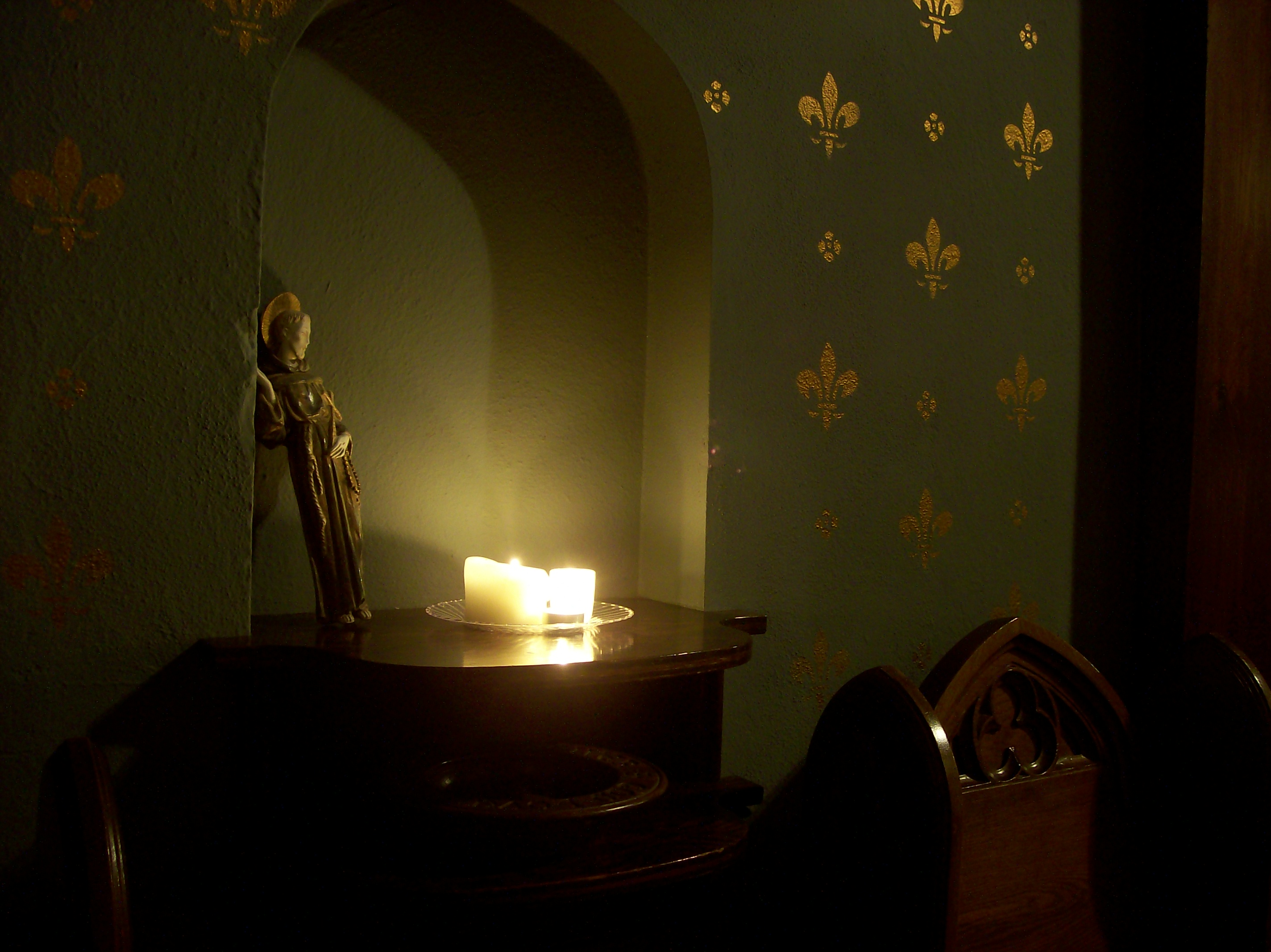
"Saint on break" in Sisters' Chapel

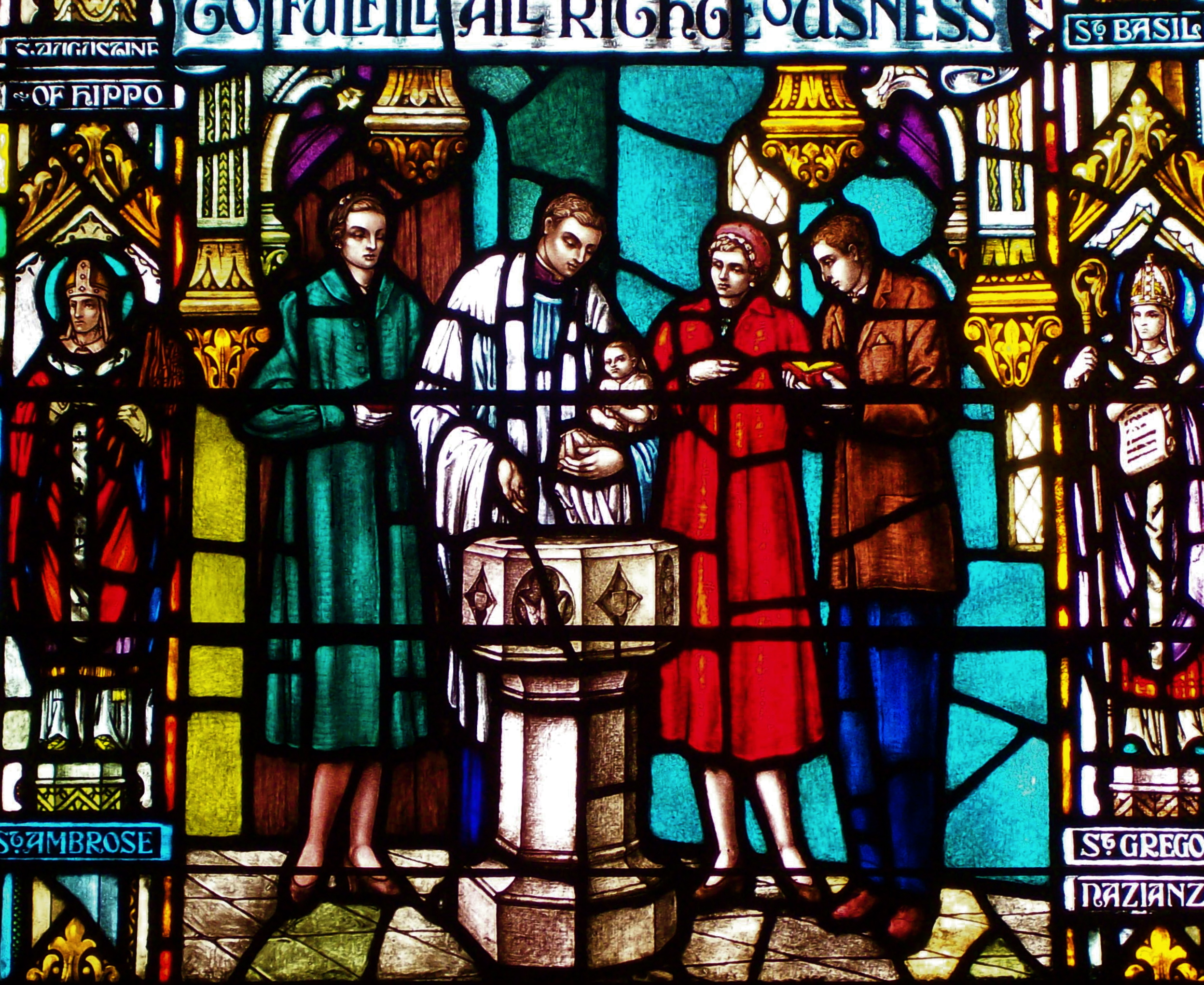
Detail from the "Baptism Window"

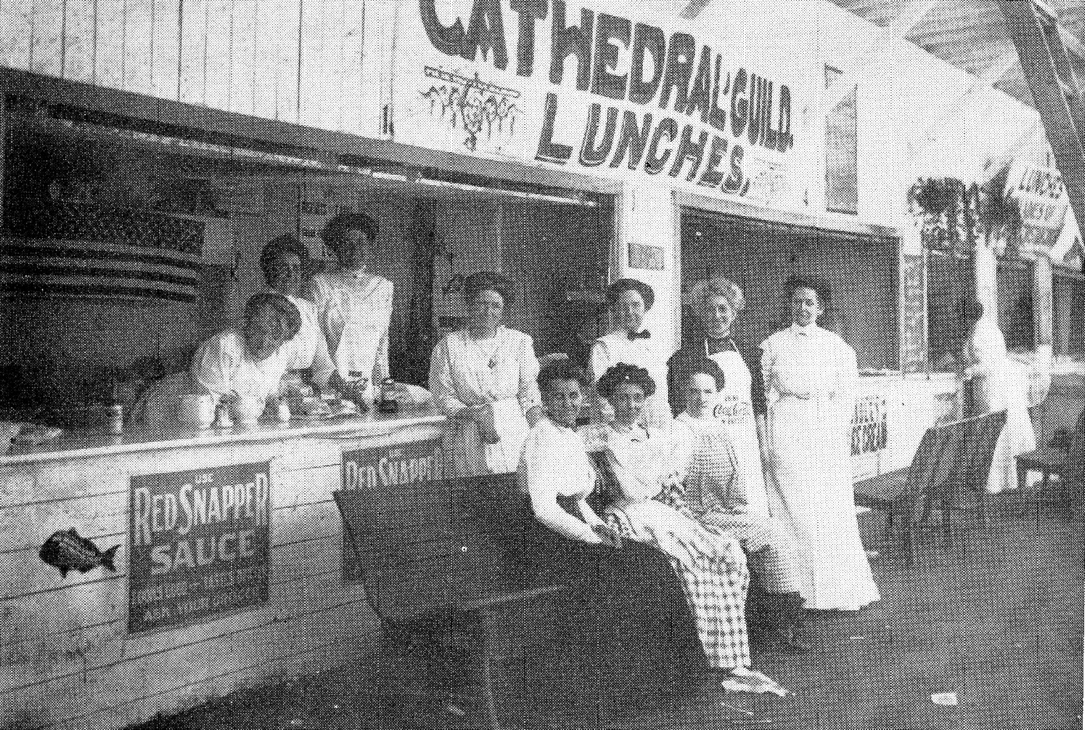
Cathedral Guild Lunches, 1906

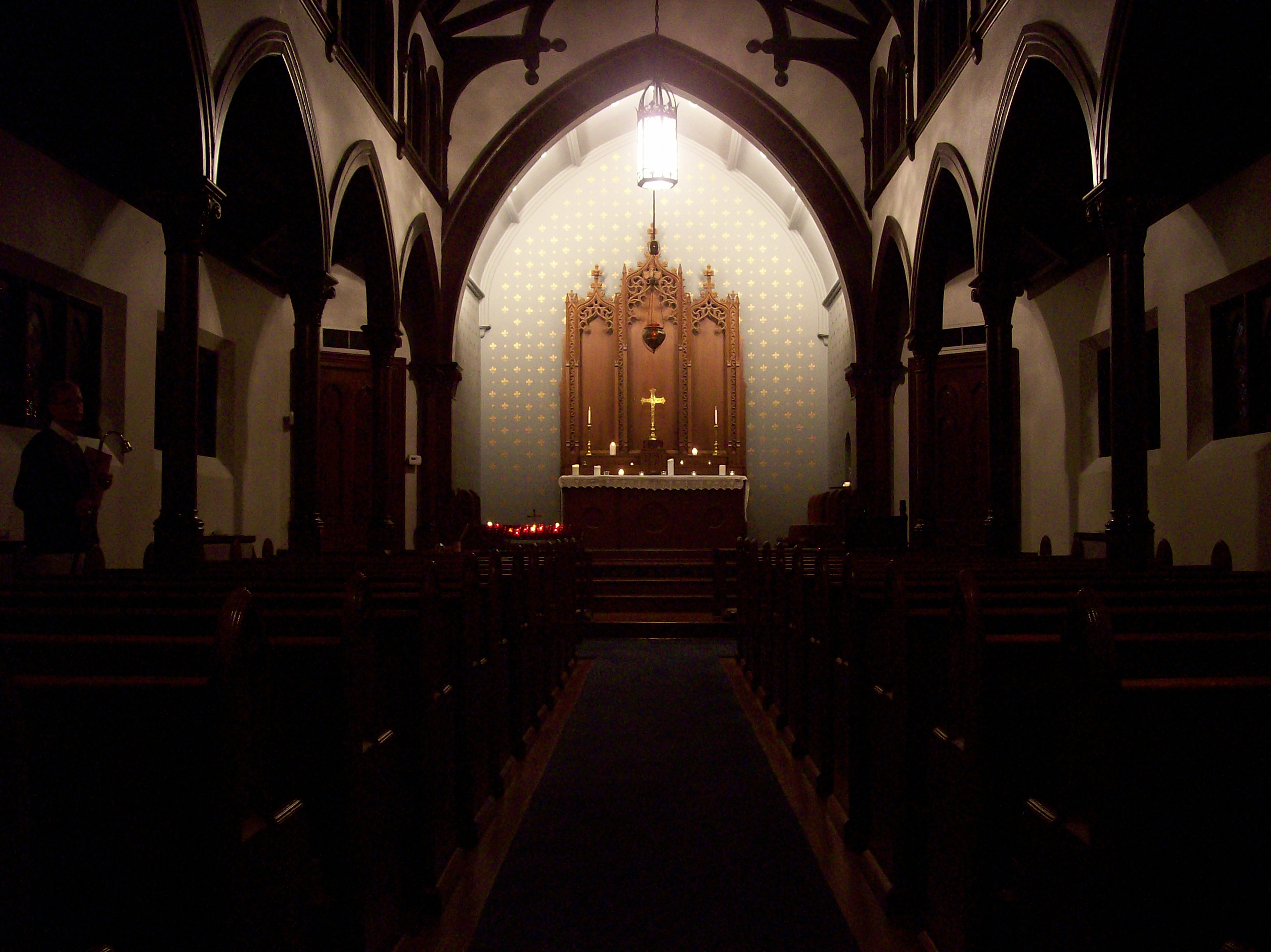
Sisters' Chapel (1888), the oldest structure in the Cathedral complex.

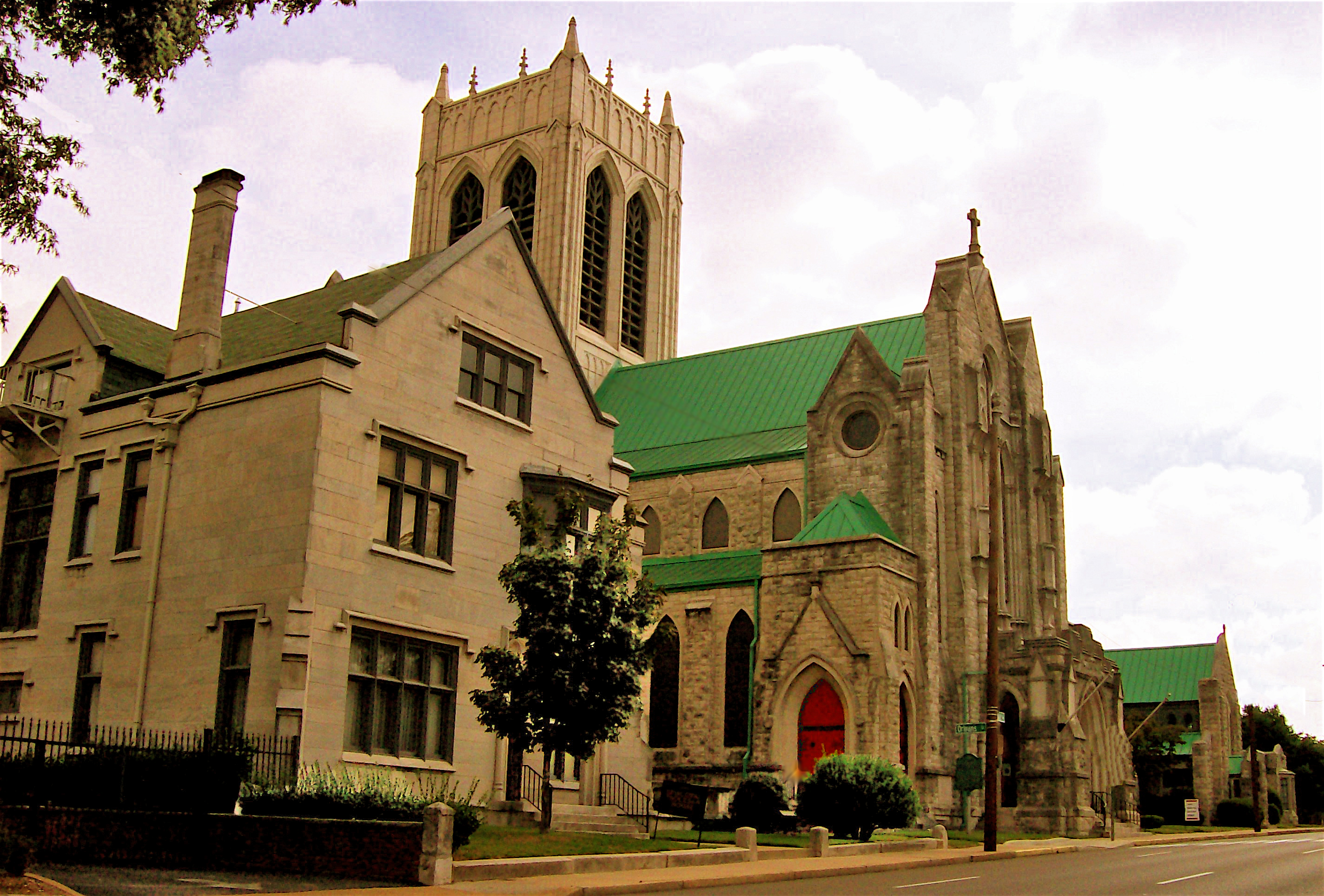
The cathedral flanked Diocesan House (left) and the Sisters' Chapel (right)

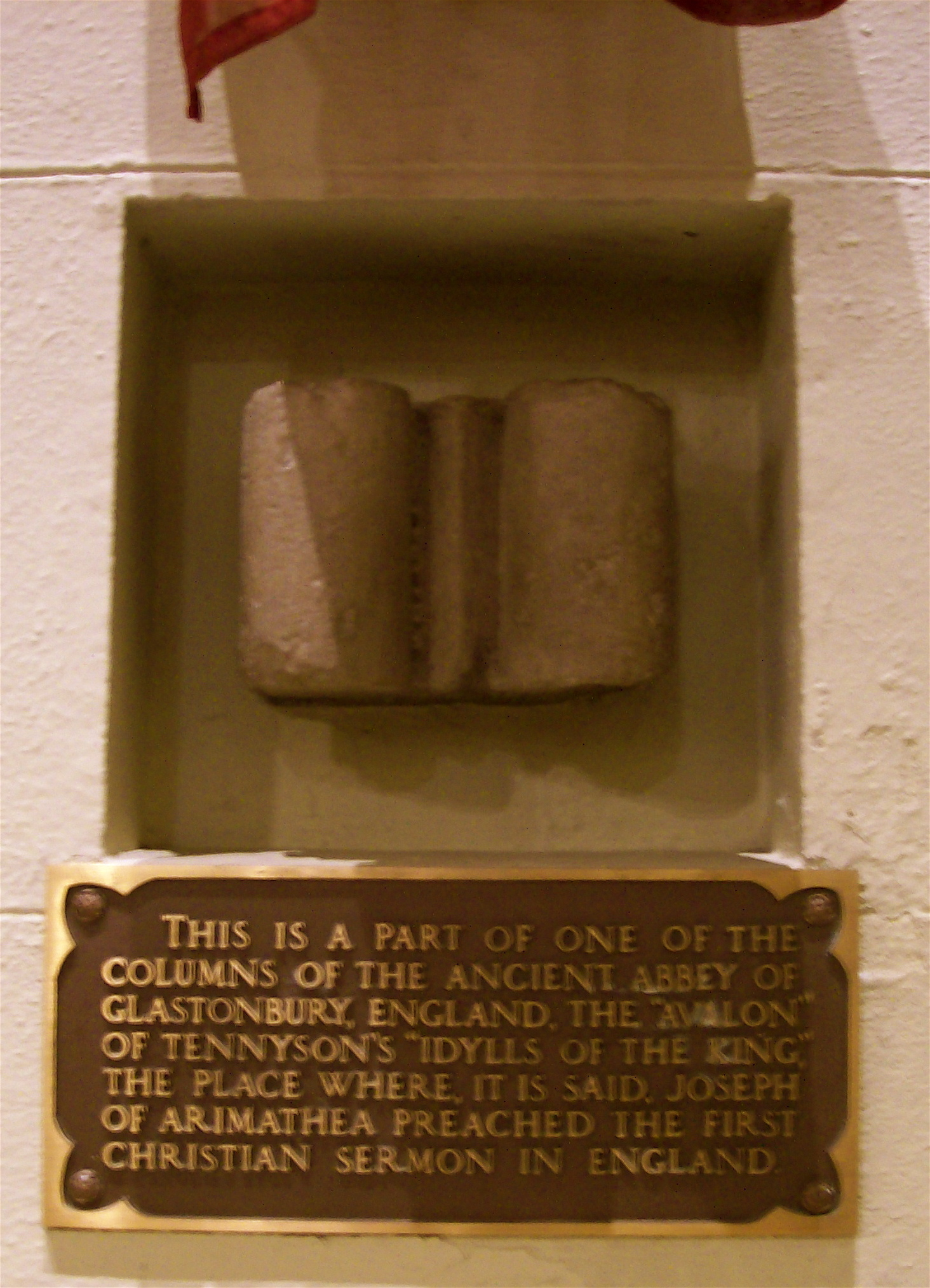
Glastonbury Abbey stone

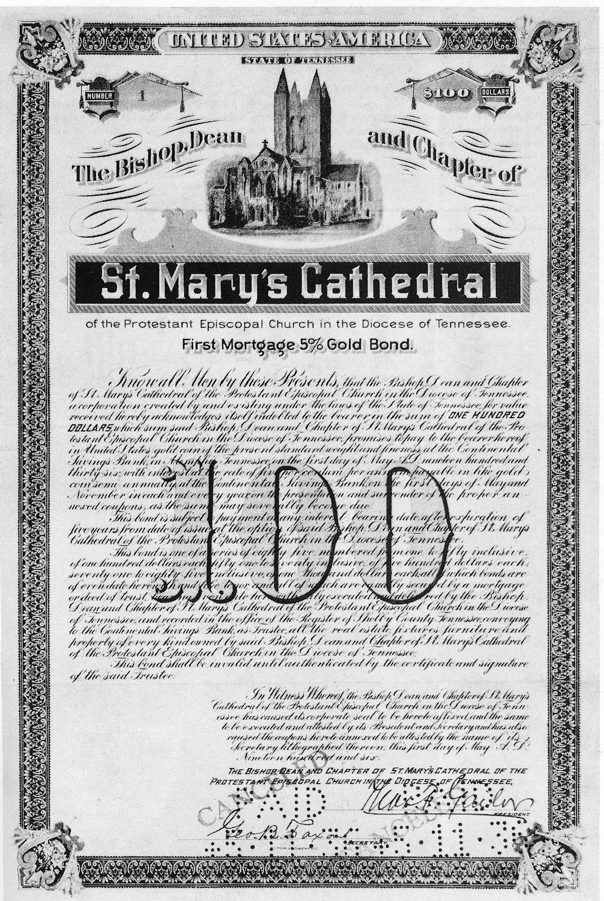
Cathedral construction bond

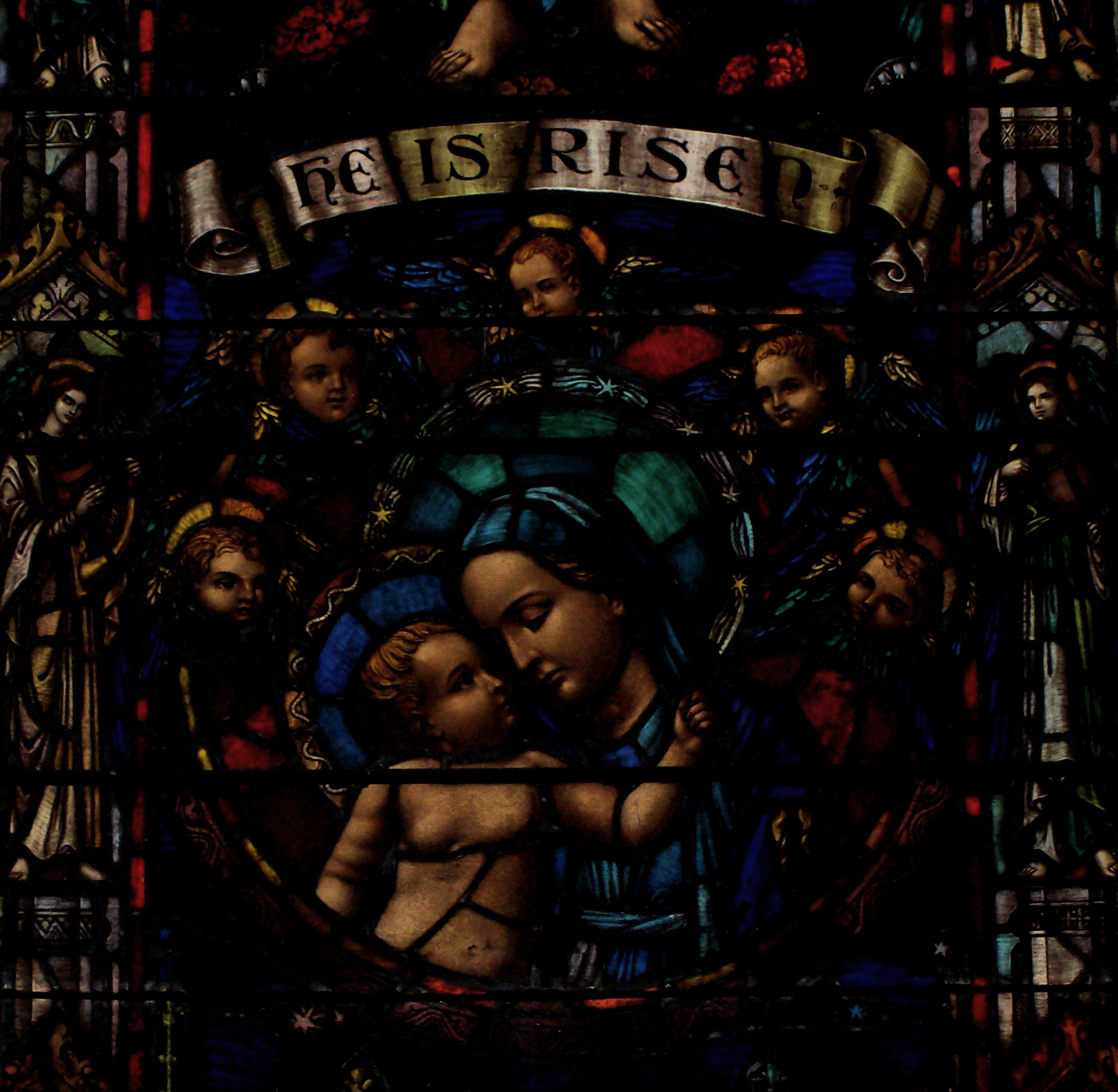
Window detail of Mary and Jesus

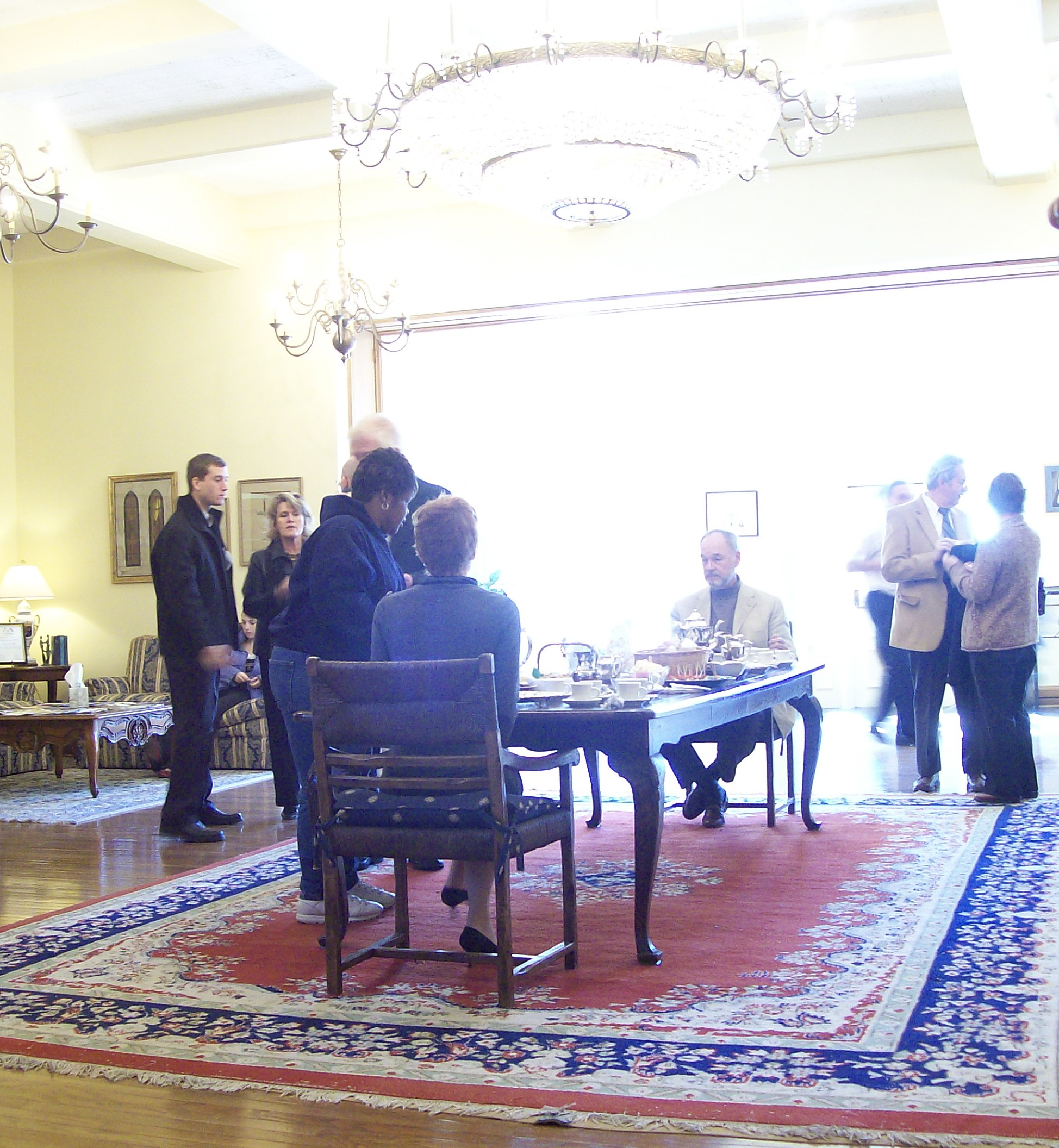
Parish Hall, built on the site of the Cloister Garden

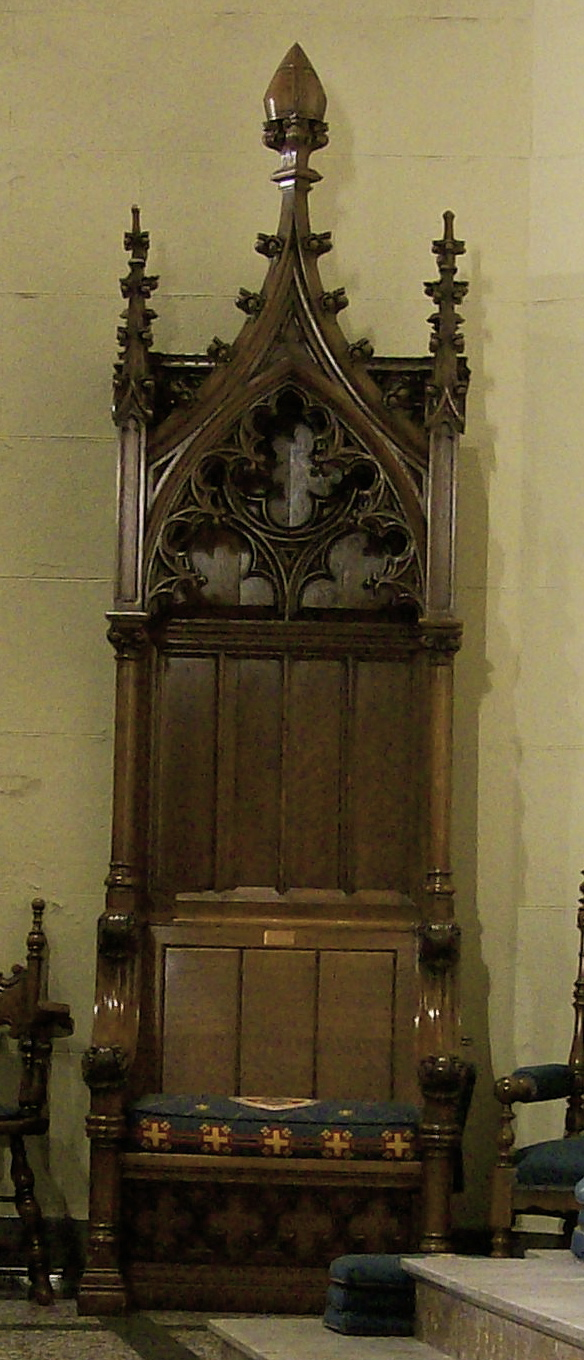
Cathedra (bishop's seat)

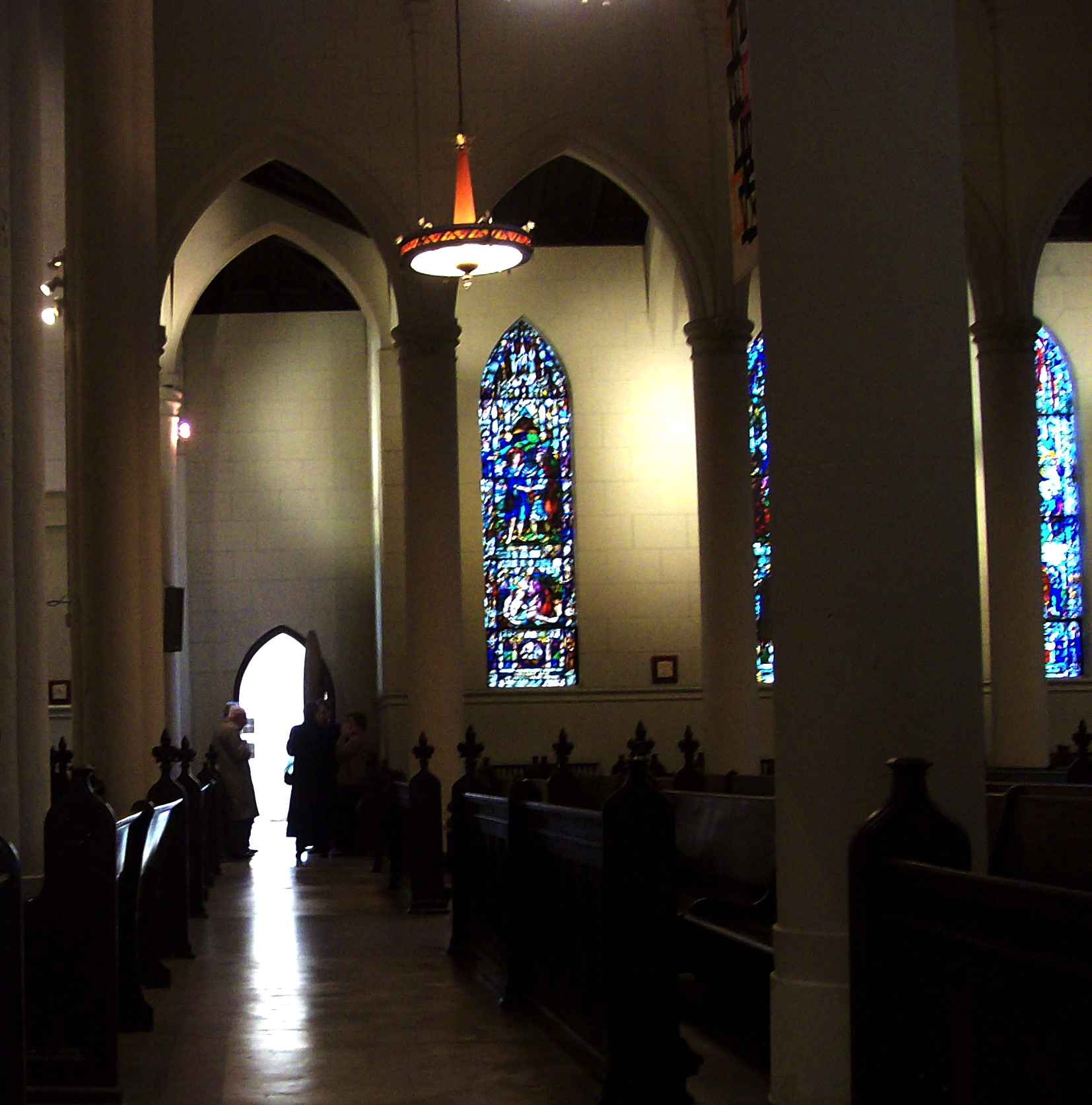
looking east across nave

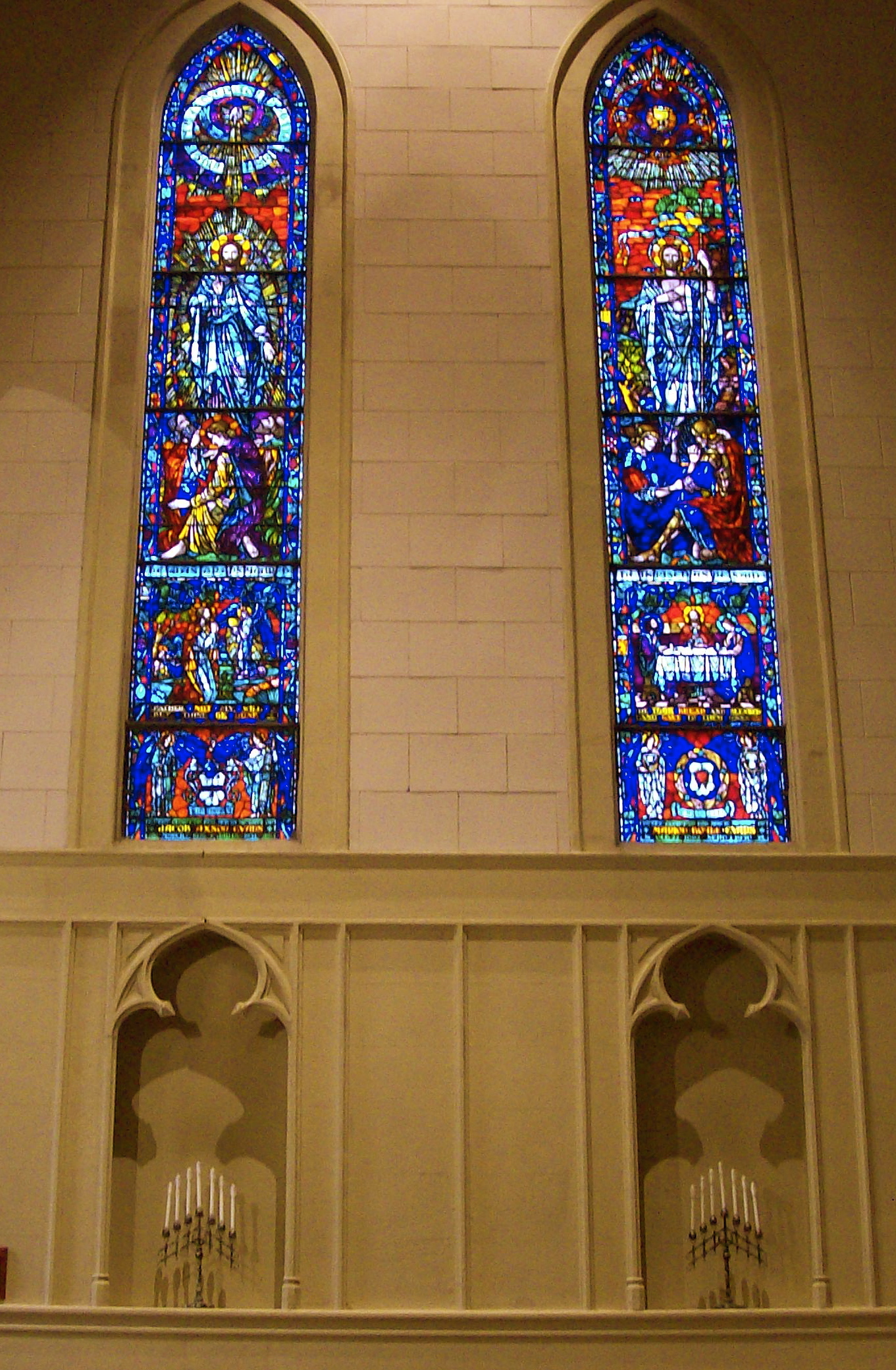
"South" transept windows

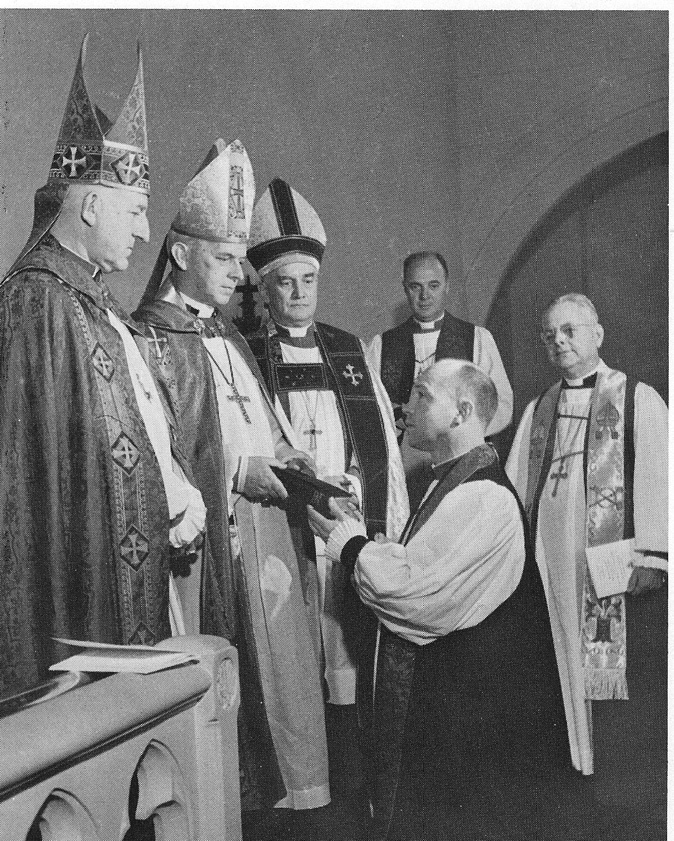
In 1962 Dean Sanders was consecrated as "Bishop Coadjutor Sanders," Diocese of Tennessee

== See also ==
- List of the Episcopal cathedrals of the United States
- List of cathedrals in the United States
- Episcopal Church in the United States of America
- Memphis sanitation strike
- Sisters of St. Mary
- Yellow fever

== Sources ==
- Project Canterbury sources
  - Ten Decades of Praise: The Story of the Community of Saint Mary during Its First Century, chapter 8: "Planting"
  - The Sisters of St. Mary at Memphis: with the Acts and Sufferings of the Priests and Others Who Were There with Them during the Yellow Fever Season of 1878
- Other sources
  - A History of the Yellow Fever: The Yellow Fever Epidemic of 1878, in Memphis, Tenn.
  - Dowd, James. (2007, July 25). "St. Mary's goes budget-lean to keep doors open in changing times". The Commercial Appeal
  - Historic Processional Cross to Lead MLK-Day March, 2001 press release, Churches Uniting in Christ.
  - St. Mary's Cathedral 1858-1958, John H. Davis [1958], published by the Chapter of St. Mary's Cathedral (Gailor Memorial), Memphis, Tennessee.
