= Charles vonRosenberg =

American bishop in the Episcopal Church (born 1947)

The Right Reverend Charles vonRosenberg
- Bishop of East Tennessee
- Church: Episcopal Church
- Diocese: East Tennessee
- Elected: October 17, 1998
- In office: 1999–2011
- Predecessor: Robert Tharp
- Successor: George D. Young III
- Other post: Provisional bishop of South Carolina (2013-2016)

Orders
- Ordination: 1975
- Consecration: February 27, 1999 by Robert Tharp

Personal details
- Born: July 11, 1947 (age 79) Fayetteville, North Carolina, United States
- Denomination: Anglican
- Spouse: Annie
- Children: 2

Charles Glenn vonRosenberg (born July 11, 1947) is an American bishop in the Episcopal Church.

== Biography ==
VonRosenberg was born in Fayetteville, North Carolina, in 1947. He received his Bachelor of Arts degree from the University of North Carolina at Chapel Hill in 1969. He completed a Master of Divinity degree at Virginia Theological Seminary in 1974 and was ordained as a priest in 1975.

VonRosenberg served as canon to the ordinary (assistant to the bishop) of the Episcopal Diocese of Upper South Carolina from 1989 to 1994. Afterwards, he became rector of St. James Episcopal Church in Wilmington, North Carolina.

On February 27, 1999, vonRosenberg was consecrated as the third bishop of the Episcopal Diocese of East Tennessee, a diocese covering 34 counties in Tennessee and three in North Georgia, with 45 congregations and five worshiping communities and nearly 16,000 active members. He retired from that position in June 2011. On January 26, 2013, he was elected as bishop provisional of the Episcopal Church in South Carolina, a diocese where reorganization took place after Bishop Mark Lawrence's departure from the Episcopal Church.

VonRosenberg referred to the departing followers of Lawrence as "sincere Christians". In describing his own task as the new bishop, vonRosenberg said "I want to use the image of rebuilding, for that is what we are called to do – to reorganize and to rebuild the Episcopal Church in South Carolina." He went on to say that the diocese should rebuild the church on the foundation of Jesus Christ, with an attitude of humility and love.

On January 14, 2016 VonRosenberg announced his intention to retire as bishop provisional after June 26 when he completed his schedule of visits to the congregations and missions of the diocese.

Episcopal Church (USA) titles
Preceded by Robert Tharp	3rd Bishop of East Tennessee; 1999–2011	Succeeded by George D. Young III
