= Brian Lee Cole =

American prelate

The Right Reverend Brian Lee Cole
- Bishop of East Tennessee
- Church: Episcopal Church
- Province: IV
- Diocese: East Tennessee
- Elected: June 28, 2017
- In office: 2017–present
- Predecessor: George D. Young III

Orders
- Ordination: 2002 by Robert Hodges Johnson
- Consecration: December 2, 2017 by Michael Curry

Personal details
- Born: December 7, 1967 Hayti, Missouri, United States
- Denomination: Anglican
- Residence: Knoxville, Tennessee, United States
- Spouse: Susan Weatherford
- Children: 1
- Education: Murray State University, Southern Baptist Theological Seminary

Brian Lee Cole AHC (born December 7, 1967) is an American prelate of the Episcopal Church who is the current Bishop of East Tennessee.

== Education ==
Cole was born in Hayti, Missouri, and was educated at Murray State University, from which he graduated with a Bachelor of Science degree in business administration in 1989. He spent time employed with the Appalachian Ministries Educational Resource Center in Berea, Kentucky. In 1992, he earned a Master of Divinity degree from the Southern Baptist Theological Seminary. In 2001, he completed studies at Sewanee: The University of the South, where he focused on Anglican church history. He also undertook further studies in art and prayer at the General Theological Seminary in 2006 and in liturgics in Asheville, North Carolina, between 2002 and 2005. Sewanee awarded him an honorary Doctor of Divinity degree in 2019.

== Ordained ministry ==
Cole was ordained priest by Bishop Robert Hodges Johnson in 2002 and served as vicar at Church of the Advocate in Asheville, North Carolina. In 2005, he became sub-dean of the Cathedral of All Souls in Asheville, while in 2012 he accepted the position of rector of the Church of the Good Shepherd in Lexington, Kentucky.

Cole was elected Bishop of East Tennessee on June 28, 2017, during the 33rd annual diocesan convention. He was then consecrated on December 2, 2017, at the Church of the Ascension in Knoxville, Tennessee with Presiding Bishop Michael Curry as chief consecrator. He was installed at St. John's Cathedral on December 3, 2017.

He is an associate of the Order of the Holy Cross.

Episcopal Church (USA) titles
Preceded by George D. Young III	5th Bishop of East Tennessee; 2017–present	Current holder
