= Episcopal Diocese of East Tennessee =

Episcopal Church diocese in the US

Diocese of East Tennessee

Location
- Country: United States
- Territory: East Tennessee
- Ecclesiastical province: IV (Southeast)
- Headquarters: 814 Episcopal School Way, Knoxville, TN 37932

Statistics
- Area: 14,350 sq mi (37,200 km^{2})
- Parishes: 47
- Congregations: 44 (2024)
- Members: 12,969 (2023)

Information
- Denomination: Episcopal Church
- Established: January 1, 1985
- Cathedral: St John's Cathedral

Current leadership
- Bishop: Brian Lee Cole

Map
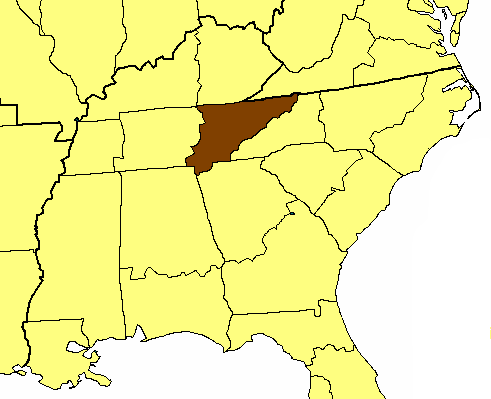
- Location of the Diocese of East Tennessee

Website
- dioet.org

The Episcopal Diocese of East Tennessee is the diocese of the Episcopal Church that geographically coincides with the political region known as the Grand Division of East Tennessee. The geographic range of the Diocese of East Tennessee was originally part of the Episcopal Diocese of Tennessee, which was partitioned into three separate dioceses during 1982–1985. It is headquartered in Knoxville, Tennessee.

The diocese reported 15,069 members in 2015 and 12,969 members in 2023; no membership statistics were reported in 2024 national parochial reports. Plate and pledge income for the 44 filing congregations of the diocese in 2024 was $16,545,785. Average Sunday attendance (ASA) was 3,907 persons. This was a relative decrease from ASA of 4,996 reported in 2015.

== Geography ==
Included in the diocese are 34 counties in East Tennessee and three counties in northern Georgia, with the Cumberland Plateau forming the western border. Forty-five congregations compose the diocese, with the bishop's seat at St. John's Cathedral in Knoxville. The cathedral was an existing parish that the diocese designated as its see after the separation from the statewide diocese. The diocese maintains weekday offices at a site in western Knoxville, adjacent to the Episcopal School of Knoxville. It also operates Grace Point Camp and Retreat Center near Kingston, Tennessee.

== History ==
When a number of planters from Virginia and North Carolina brought their Anglicanism with them to Tennessee, they largely bypassed the rugged, mountainous terrain of the eastern part of the state, in favor of fertile lands in the middle and western parts of the state to grow tobacco and cotton. Therefore, prior to the Civil War, only a few towns in the region had Episcopal congregations. It was not until well into the 20th century that significant growth occurred in East Tennessee, facilitated in large measure by mission-minded bishops and priests.

Prior to the division of the diocese, the seat of the bishop was St. Mary's Cathedral in Memphis, over 250 miles away from most of the eastern part of the state. However, by the 1960s, the statewide diocese had offices in Memphis, Nashville, and Knoxville, staffed by a diocesan and two suffragan bishops, one of each stationed in one of the offices (although one of the bishops, Knoxville-based William E. Sanders, was actually a bishop coadjutor). When Sanders succeeded John Vander Horst as diocesan in 1977, talks began to separate the statewide diocese into three territories; the plans were approved by the General Convention in 1982. First, the western counties of the state were excised to form the Diocese of West Tennessee, in 1983. Then, two years later, the East Tennessee diocese came into existence. Sanders, having the choice to stay with the continuing mid-state diocese (which would necessitate a move to Nashville) or become the new diocese's first bishop, chose to remain in Knoxville, where he had been stationed for years. He became the inaugural diocesan until his retirement, when he was succeeded by Robert G. Tharp. Charles G. vonRosenberg was the third bishop of East Tennessee, until his retirement in 2011. The fourth bishop, George D. Young, was consecrated on June of that year in Knoxville. The fifth bishop, Brian L. Cole, was consecrated in 2017.

Unlike some nearby Southern dioceses (an example being the continuing Tennessee Diocese in the middle part of the state), the East Tennessee diocese has not undergone significant turmoil and division due to controversies stemming from the consecration of a non-celibate gay man, Gene Robinson, to the episcopate of the Diocese of New Hampshire in 2003. This is largely because the main constituencies protesting the action, evangelicals and conservative Anglo-Catholics, have relatively little presence in the diocese, most of whose parishes and missions prefer a tolerant, Broad Church understanding of doctrine and practice.

There are approximately 150 clergy in the diocese, including those serving congregations, non-parochial and retired priests, and deacons. A preponderance of the diocese's communicants reside in the metropolitan areas of Knoxville and Chattanooga; however, the church is well represented in the small towns of the diocese, probably to a greater extent than the territories of the other two dioceses in the state.

=== List of bishops ===
Bishops of East Tennessee
From	Until	Incumbent	Notes
1985	1992	William Evan Sanders	William Evan Sanders (born December 25, 1919, Natchez, MS); translated from Tennessee, January 1, 1985; retired January 1, 1991.
1992	1999	Robert Tharp	Robert Gould "Bob" Tharp (October 25, 1928, Orlando, FL – May 30, 2003); elected coadjutor November 17, 1990; consecrated May 4, 1991; succeeded January 1, 1992; retired February 27, 1999; later interregnum assisting bishop in Atlanta.
1999	2011	Charles G. vonRosenberg	Charles Glenn vonRosenberg (born July 11, 1947, Fayetteville, NC); elected October 17, 1998; consecrated February 27, 1999; retired June 2011.
2011	2017	George D. Young III	George Dibrell Young III (born September 28, 1955, Jacksonville, FL); elected February 11 and consecrated June 25, 2011.
2017	present	Brian Lee Cole	Brian Lee Cole; elected July 28 and consecrated December 2, 2017.

== See also ==
- Province 4 of the Episcopal Church in the United States of America
- Episcopal Diocese of Tennessee
- Episcopal Diocese of West Tennessee
