= St. John's Cathedral (Knoxville, Tennessee) =

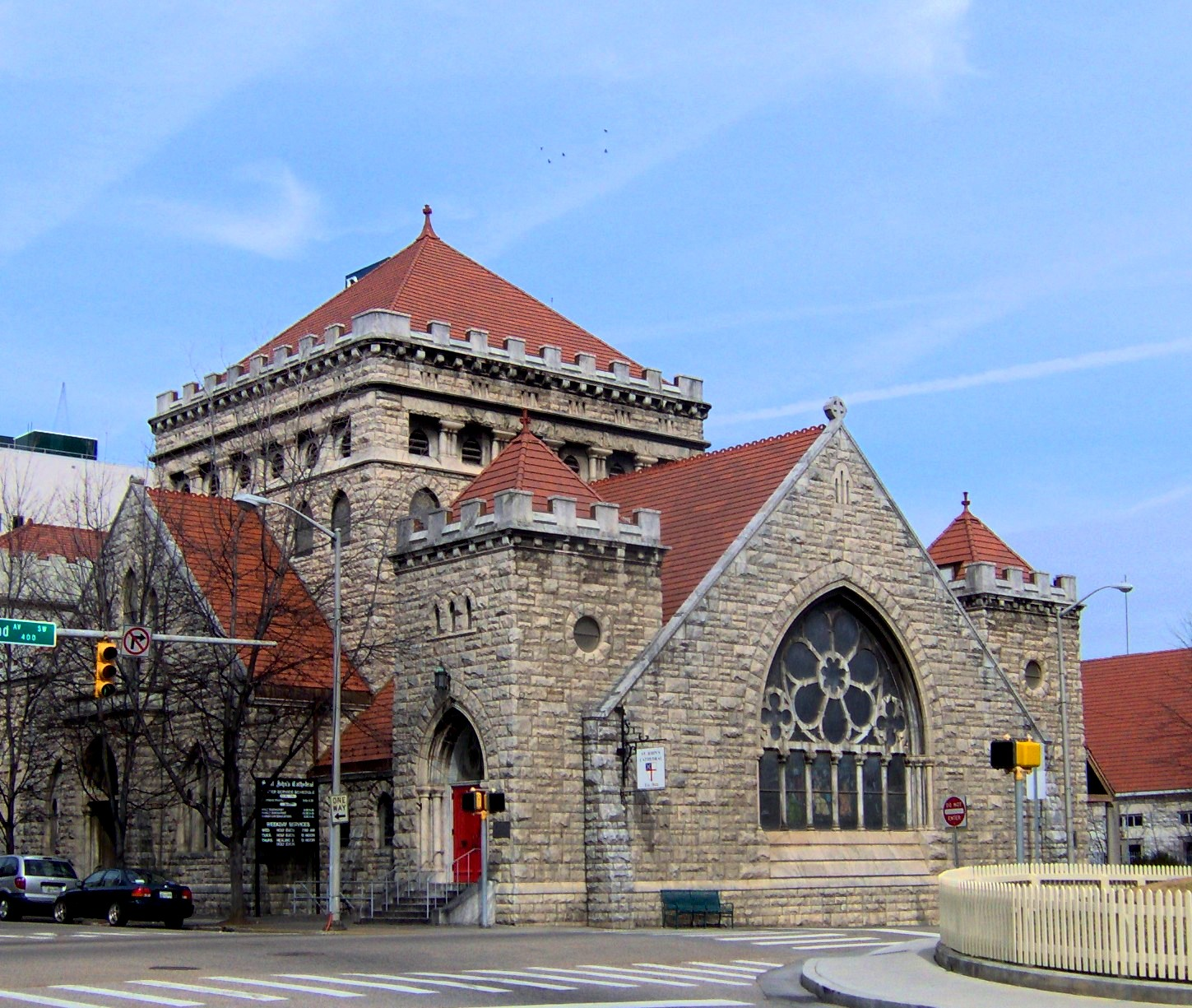
- The cathedral in 2008

- Location within Tennessee
- 35°57′43.53″N 83°55′7.34″W
- Location: 413 W. Cumberland Ave. Knoxville, Tennessee
- Country: United States
- Denomination: Episcopal Church in the United States of America
- Website: www.stjohnscathedral.org

History
- Founded: 1826

Architecture
- Architect: J.W. Yost
- Style: Gothic Revival
- Groundbreaking: 1891
- Completed: 1892

Administration
- Diocese: East Tennessee

Clergy
- Bishop: The Rt. Rev. Brian Lee Cole
- Dean: The Very Rev. Chris Hackett

St. John's Cathedral located at 413 Cumberland Avenue in Knoxville, Tennessee, is the cathedral church of the Episcopal Diocese of East Tennessee.

In 2025, the cathedral reported 1,309 members Average Sunday Attendance (ASA) reported by the cathedral in 2025 was 352 persons. This was a relative decrease from ASA of 436 persons reported in 2020.

== History and building ==
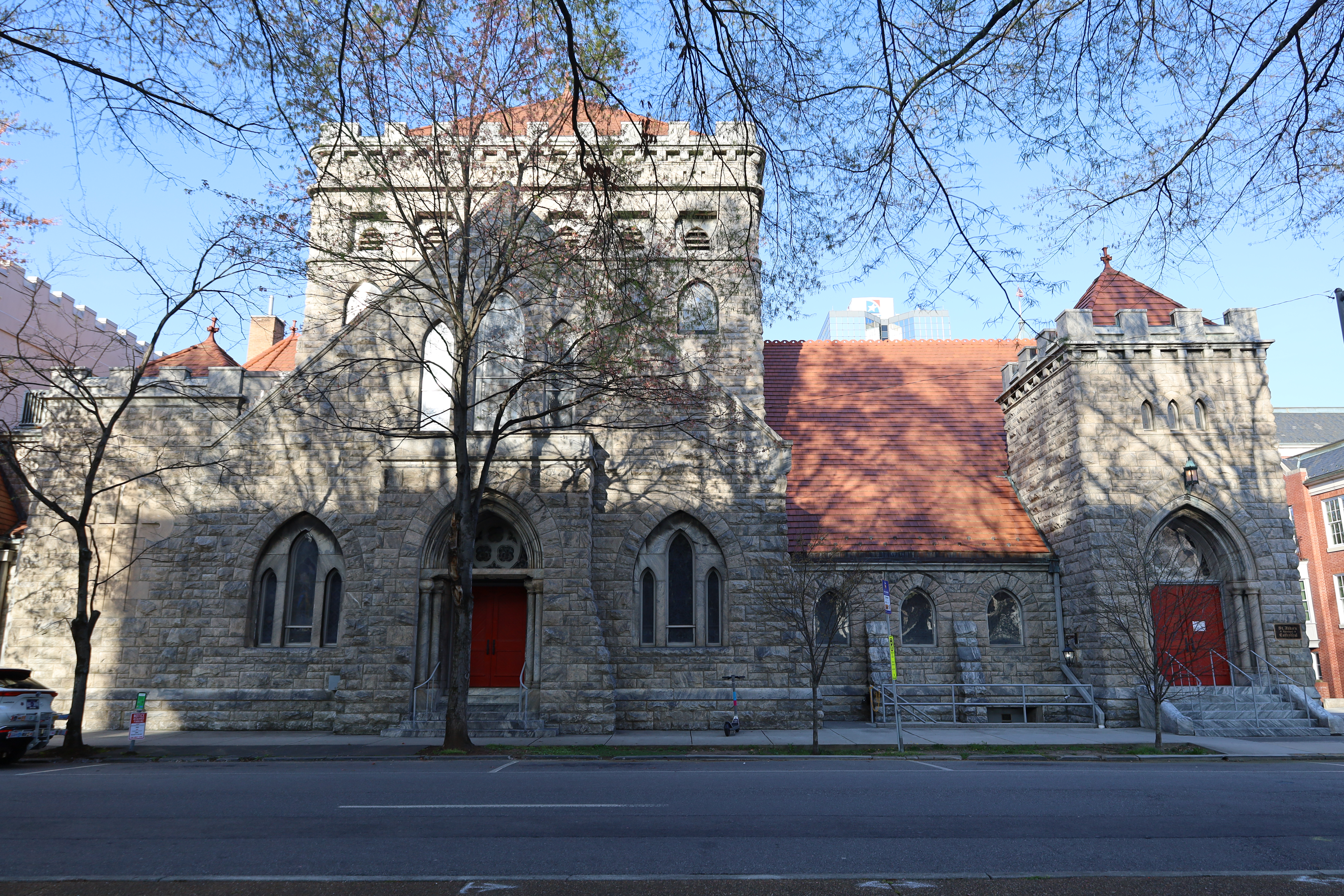
Side view in 2025

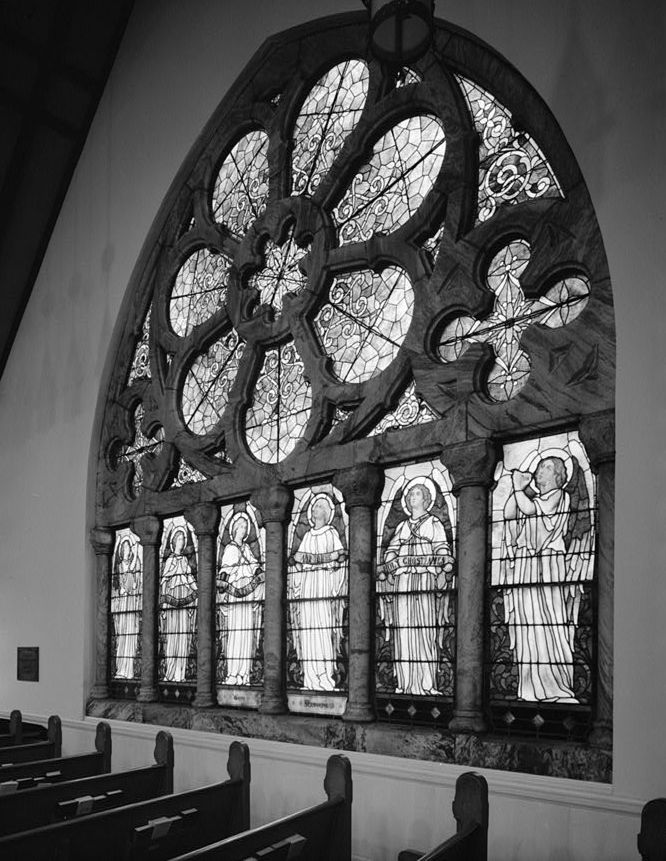
Rose window on the south wall in 1983

Established in 1826 (35 years after the founding of Knoxville), St. John’s Church was one of the congregations represented at the Primary Convention when the Diocese of Tennessee was organized in Nashville in 1829. In May 1844, with 25 communicants, St. John’s became the first mission from Eastern Tennessee to be admitted to the Diocese of Tennessee.

In 1891, the original building was razed to make room for a larger facility, which was completed in 1892. The architect for the current building was J.W. Yost of Columbus, Ohio. The stone church is built in a Latin cross form, but the nave, transepts, and apse are minimal in size compared to the crossing, resulting in a large central space. The architectural style is Richardsonian Romanesque. Features include a slate roof, turrets, buttresses, and rose windows.

A devastating fire in the church building in 1919 destroyed many of the original stained glass windows, but the building was promptly restored. In 1963, extensive renovation created the undercroft beneath the nave floor. In 1986, St. John’s was designated as the seat of the bishop for the newly created Diocese of East Tennessee.

Members of St. John's have started a number of organizations in Knoxville, including the Episcopal Church of the Ascension (1957), Volunteer Mission Center (1978), and the Episcopal School of Knoxville (1999). The cathedral has adopted Green Magnet School as a resource provider (2013).

The Great Hall was added to the facility in 1984, along with other interior renovations. The old church office building was torn down to create an enclosed courtyard. The Cathedral also acquired an adjacent office building, originally constructed for the Diocese of East Tennessee, and now use it as the church's offices and a meeting center. A major exterior and interior restoration project took place between 2018 and 2020 to correct moisture intrusion problems, repair the sanctuary interior, install state of the art lighting and sound systems, update restroom facilities, and create a new library and several other upgrades. Much of the work was done in preparation for the installation of a new Goulding & Wood organ, dedicated to Jim and Natalie Haslam by Steve and Ann Haslam Bailey.

The Very Reverend Chris Hackett is Dean of the Cathedral. The Reverend Canon Thom Rasnick is the Sub-Dean.

== Labyrinth ==
Chartres labyrinth plan

The cathedral courtyard features the Mary Clark Wright Memorial Labyrinth which was commissioned by her children. The maze is a replica of the Chartres Cathedral pattern and includes lunations, trefoils, and petals sculpted in terra cotta and light gray paving stones. The path is about 12.5 inches wide and the labyrinth is 39 feet in diameter, with a total path length of 750 feet. Work on the project was completed by Labyrinths in Stone, of Yorkville, Illinois, and the dedication ceremony was held in September 2001. The labyrinth was refurbished in 2006 and is available for community use through the church offices.

== See also ==
- List of the Episcopal cathedrals of the United States
- List of cathedrals in the United States
- Episcopal Diocese of Tennessee
- Episcopal Diocese of West Tennessee
- Thomas William Humes
