= William A. Beckham =

American bishop (1927–2005)

The Right Reverend William Arthur Beckham D.D., D.H.L.
- Bishop of Upper South Carolina
- Church: Episcopal Church
- Diocese: Upper South Carolina
- Elected: 1979
- In office: 1979–1994
- Successor: George Moyer Alexander
- Opposed to: Dorsey F. Henderson Jr.

Orders
- Ordination: 1955 by Clarence Alfred Cole
- Consecration: October 5, 1979 by John Allin

Personal details
- Born: April 29, 1927 Columbia, South Carolina, United States
- Died: December 24, 2005 (aged 78) Columbia, South Carolina, United States
- Buried: Trinity Cathedral yard
- Denomination: Anglican
- Parents: Francis Morgan Beckham & Maud Elizabeth Guthrie
- Spouse: Harriet Louise Wingate
- Children: 4

William Arthur Beckham (April 29, 1927 – December 24, 2005) was sixth bishop of the Episcopal Diocese of Upper South Carolina, serving from 1979 to 1994.

== Early life and education ==
Beckham was born on April 29, 1927, in Columbia, South Carolina, the son of Francis Morgan Beckham, Jr. (1903-1967) and Maud Elizabeth Guthrie (1906-1996). Beckham enrolled in the US Navy and served aboard the battleship USS Iowa in the Pacific theatre between 1943 and 1945. On December 17, 1948, he married Harriet Louise Wingate, and together had four children. He studied at the University of South Carolina and graduated with a Bachelor of Science in 1951. He also studied at the Virginia Theological Seminary from which he earned his Master of Divinity in 1954, and was awarded an honorary Doctor of Divinity in 1980. He was also awarded an honorary Doctor of Divinity from the University of the South in 1985, and a Doctor of Humane Letters from St Augustine's College in 1989.

== Ordained ministry ==
Beckham was made deacon in 1954 and ordained priest in 1955. Between 1954 and 1957 he served three missions in Upper South Carolina: St Stephen's Church in Johnston, South Carolina, Our Saviour's Church in Trenton, South Carolina, and Trinity Church in Edgefield, South Carolina. In 1957, he became rector of Nativity Church in Union, South Carolina, and vicar of Calvary Church in Glenn Springs, South Carolina, posts he retained till 1958. Between 1958 and 1963, he served as rector of the Church of the Resurrection in Greenwood, South Carolina. He then became Archdeacon of Upper South Carolina on January 1, 1964, where he remained till 1979. From 1963 till 1979, he was also the secretary of the Diocese of Upper South Carolina.

== Bishop ==
During a special diocesan convention held in 1979, Beckham was elected as the sixth Bishop of Upper South Carolina. Beckham was consecrated on October 5, 1979, at Trinity Cathedral in Columbia, South Carolina. Beckham retired in 1994. Between 1991 and 1997, he was a trustee and chair of the New York-based Church Pension Fund. In 1994, his son Stephen murdered his wife Vickie.
