= Daniel Richards (bishop) =

American Episcopalian prelate

The Right Reverend Daniel P. Richards
- IX Bishop of Upper South Carolina
- Church: Episcopal Church
- Diocese: Upper South Carolina
- Elected: September 25, 2021
- Previous posts: Rector, Christ Church of the Ascension, Paradise Valley

Orders
- Ordination: May 25, 2003 (deacon) by Robert Shahan; December 3, 2003 (priest) by Robert Shahan
- Consecration: February 26, 2022 by Michael Curry, Jennifer A. Reddall, Ruth Woodliff-Stanley, W. Andrew Waldo

Personal details
- Born: October 15, 1975 (age 51) Cleveland, Mississippi
- Denomination: Anglican
- Education: Grand Canyon University, (B.A); Church Divinity School of the Pacific, (M.Div)

Ordination history of Daniel Richards
History
Diaconal ordination
- Ordained by: Robert Shahan
Priestly ordination
- Ordained by: Robert Shahan
Episcopal consecration
- Principal consecrator: Michael Curry
- Co-consecrators: Jennifer A. Reddall, Ruth Woodliff-Stanley, W. Andrew Waldo

Daniel Paul Richards is an American Episcopalian prelate. He has served as the ninth bishop of Upper South Carolina since 2022.

== Early life and education ==
Richards was born in Cleveland, Mississippi, and spent his early years in Mississippi and Tennessee before relocating to Phoenix, Arizona, during high school. He graduated summa cum laude from Grand Canyon University in 1994 with a Bachelor of Arts in Creative Arts in Worship: Speech and Performance, a ministry degree. Originally ordained as a Southern Baptist minister in 1996, he later joined the Episcopal Church in 1997 and pursued theological education at the Church Divinity School of the Pacific, earning his degree in 2003.

== Ordained ministry ==
Richards was ordained to the diaconate on May 25, 2003, and to the priesthood on December 3, 2003. His early ministry included serving as curate at Saint Michael and All Angels in Tucson, Arizona, followed by four years at the Church of the Holy Spirit in Phoenix. During this time, he was active in diocesan ministry, including service on the Commission on Ministry and as a spiritual director at Chapel Rock Camp and Conference Center.

In 2009, Richards became rector of Grace Episcopal Church in Traverse City, Michigan, where he also served as the dean of the Grand Traverse Deanery from 2010 to 2015. His work there included participation in local ecumenical initiatives and outreach programs.

He returned to Arizona in 2015 to serve as rector of Christ Church of the Ascension in Paradise Valley. During this period, he also led the East Phoenix Deanery and was president of the board of Chapel Rock Camp and Conference Center. Additionally, he volunteered as a chaplain for the Phoenix Fire Department from 2018 to 2021.

== Episcopacy ==
On September 25, 2021, Richards was elected as the ninth bishop of the Episcopal Diocese of Upper South Carolina. He was consecrated by Presiding Bishop Michael Curry, along with bishops Jennifer A. Reddall, Ruth Woodliff-Stanley, and W. Andrew Waldo.

Episcopal Church (USA) titles
Preceded by W. Andrew Waldo	Bishop of Upper South Carolina; 2022−present	Incumbent
