= Kirkman G. Finlay =

American bishop

The Right Reverend Kirkman George Finlay D.D., LL.D.
- Bishop of Upper South Carolina
- Church: Episcopal Church
- Diocese: Upper South Carolina
- Elected: 1922
- In office: 1922–1938
- Successor: John J. Gravatt
- Previous post: Coadjutor Bishop of South Carolina (1921-1922)

Orders
- Ordination: September 1903 by Ellison Capers
- Consecration: January 20, 1921 by William A. Guerry

Personal details
- Born: October 1, 1877 Greenville, South Carolina, United States
- Died: August 27, 1938 (aged 60) Flat Rock, North Carolina, United States
- Buried: Trinity Episcopal Cathedral (Columbia, South Carolina)
- Denomination: Anglican
- Parents: James Alexander Finlay & Marian Ponsonby Gun
- Spouse: Lucy Reed
- Children: 5

Kirkman George Finlay (October 1, 1877 - August 27, 1938) was the first bishop of the Episcopal Diocese of Upper South Carolina.

== Background and early ministry ==
Kirkman George Finlay was born on October 1, 1877, to James Finlay and Marian Ponsonby Gun. A few years prior to his birth, Finlay's family came to South Carolina from Scotland by way of Canada. Within months of arriving in Greenville, five of the eight Finlay children died of diphtheria. James Finlay was financially well-off and, "as a gentleman farmer", operated a farm in Greenville named The Cedars.

Finlay attended a private school in Greenville, and later attended Furman University, receiving a Bachelor of Literature degree in June, 1899.

Finlay's older brother, John, had studied for the ministry and had been ordained to the diaconate, but died before he could be ordained to the priesthood. Soon after his graduation from Furman, Finlay left for Sewanee. While at Sewanee, during the summer of 1901, Finlay met his future wife, Lucy Reed of St. George; they married on April 22, 1903, in Clemson, South Carolina. Finlay's first cure was Holy Trinity, Clemson; additionally, Finlay was responsible for St. Paul's, Pendleton; Ascension, Seneca; and St. John's, Walhalla. The couple's first son, James Alexander Finlay, was born in 1906, but died in October, 1907.

Finlay was called as rector of Trinity Church in Columbia in 1907; he remained there for thirteen years. During his time at Trinity Church, he helped move the parish away from the renting of pews as a source of income, and instituted "the Every Member Canvass as the chief source of parish support". In June, 1918, Finlay was granted a leave of absence to serve in France with the YMCA; he served for a total of seventeen months. Finlay returned from France in 1919, and was active politically when social justice concerns were debated in the state legislature.

In 1920, Finlay was elected bishop coadjutor of the diocese, and he ended his term as rector of Trinity Church on December 31 of that year. He was consecrated bishop on January 20, 1921, by Bishops Williams Alexander Guerry (South Carolina, and acting for the Presiding Bishop), Frederick F. Reese (Georgia), and Joseph B. Cheshire (North Carolina).

== Episcopacy ==
As bishop coadjutor of the Episcopal Diocese of South Carolina, Finlay was responsible for the Piedmont region of the state. The diocese was divided in October 1922, and he became bishop diocesan of the Episcopal Diocese of Upper South Carolina.

During the 1920s and 1930s, Finlay was responsible for many endeavors to create churches and schools for African Americans. In 1928, he became Chairman of the Board of Trustees of the Voorhees Normal and Industrial School for Negroes at Denmark, South Carolina. By 1934, all but the two South Carolina dioceses afforded African Americans representation with a vote in diocesan affairs, and Finlay was working hard to change this; though the change was not approved in the 1934 diocesan convention, it was approved in the 1947 diocesan convention.

Finlay was one of the church leaders instrumental in the creation of the Kanuga Conference Center in the late 1920s and early 1930s.

Finlay died at Kanuga on August 27, 1938. He is buried in the churchyard of Trinity Episcopal Cathedral, Columbia, SC.
