= George Moyer Alexander =

Bishop of the Episcopal Diocese of Upper South Carolina

The Right Reverend George Moyer Alexander D.D., D.C.L., S.T.D.
- Bishop of Upper South Carolina
- Church: Episcopal Church
- Diocese: Upper South Carolina
- Elected: July 18, 1972
- In office: 1973–1979
- Successor: John A. Pinckney
- Opposed to: William A. Beckham

Orders
- Ordination: January 1940 by Frank Juhan
- Consecration: January 5, 1973 by John E. Hines

Personal details
- Born: May 15, 1914 Jacksonville, Florida, United States
- Died: January 9, 1983 (aged 68) Columbia, South Carolina, United States
- Buried: Trinity Cathedral yard
- Denomination: Anglican
- Parents: George Rowell Alexander & Monimia Starrat
- Spouse: Mary Danto Bedell
- Children: 2
- Education: University of the South

George Moyer Alexander (May 15, 1914 – January 9, 1983) was fifth bishop of the Episcopal Diocese of Upper South Carolina, serving from 1973 to 1979.

== Early life and education ==
Alexander was born on May 15, 1914, in Jacksonville, Florida, the son of George Rowell Alexander and Monimia Starrat. He was educated at the Jacksonville High School, before attending the University of Florida in 1935. He married Mary Danto Bedell on May 25, 1935, and together had two sons. He then studied at the University of the South from where he earned a Bachelor of Arts in 1938, a Bachelor of Divinity in 1939, and a Master of Sacred Theology in 1957, and awarded a Doctor of Civil Law in 1973. He also received an honorary Doctor of Divinity from the Virginia Theological Seminary in 1957, and an honorary Doctor of Sacred Theology degree from Seabury-Western Theological Seminary in 1957.

== Ordained ministry ==
Alexander was ordained deacon in 1939 and priest in January 1940 by Bishop Frank Juhan of Florida. He became priest-in-charge of St Mary's Church in Green Cove Springs, Florida and of Grace Church in Orange Park, Florida, and served from 1939 till 1942. In 1942, he became rector of St Mark's Church in Palatka, Florida and priest-in-charge of St Paul's Church in Federal Point, Florida, while in 1945 he transferred to Holy Trinity Church in Gainesville, Florida to serve as its rector. Between 1949 and 1955, he served as rector of Trinity Church in Columbia, South Carolina, while between 1955 and 1956, he served as a fellow at the General Theological Seminary. Alexander was appointed Dean of the School of Theology at the University of the South, a post he retained till 1973.

== Bishop ==
On July 18, 1972, at a special Convention of the Diocese, Alexander was elected as the fifth Bishop of Upper South Carolina. He was consecrated on January 5, 1973, in Trinity Church, by Presiding Bishop John E. Hines. During his episcopacy, Alexander was instrumental in established Trinity Church as the diocesan cathedral. Alexander retired in 1979.
