= Kanuga Conference Center =

Historic conference center in North Carolina, United States

- Interactive map of the Kanuga Conference Center area

General information
- Type: Conference center, summer camp, hosting facility
- Location: North Carolina, Hendersonville, United States
- Coordinates: 35°15′43″N 82°31′16″W
- Opened: 1928
- Owner: Non-profit corporation of the same name ceded in 1972 from The Episcopal Diocese of East Carolina, The Episcopal Diocese of North Carolina, The Episcopal Diocese of South Carolina, The Episcopal Diocese of Upper South Carolina, and The Episcopal Diocese of Western North Carolina

Website
- http://www.kanuga.org
- Kanuga Lake Historic District
- U.S. National Register of Historic Places
- U.S. Historic district
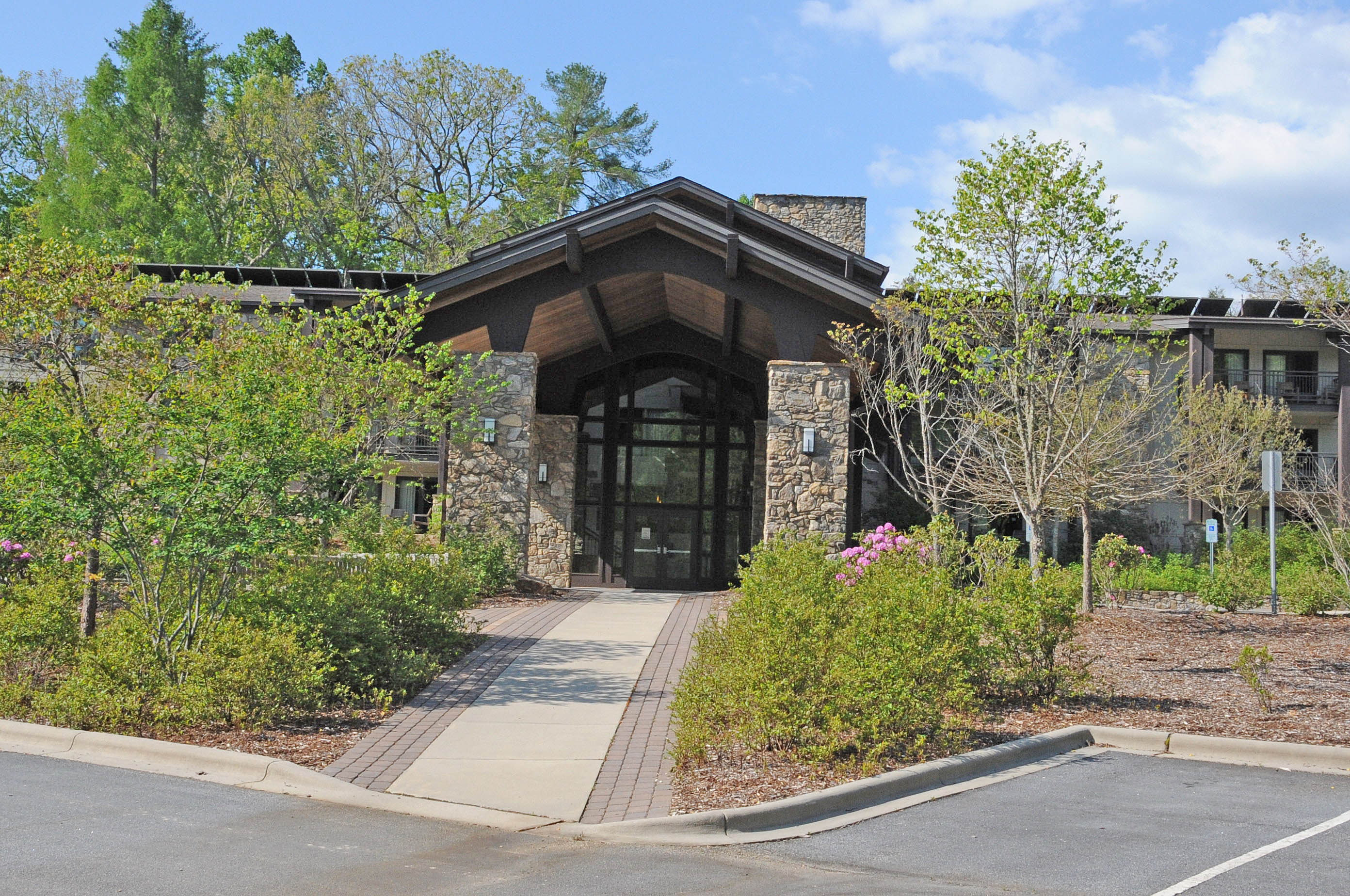

- Location within North Carolina Location within the United States
- Nearest city: Hendersonville, North Carolina
- Area: 100 acres (40 ha)
- Built: 1909
- Architect: John Nolen; Richard Sharp Smith, et al.
- Architectural style: Bungalow/craftsman
- NRHP reference No.: 95001056
- Added to NRHP: August 31, 1995

Kanuga Conference Center (Cherokee: ᎧᏄᎦ) is affiliated with the Episcopal Church in the United States of America and the Anglican Communion. It is located on 1,400 acres (5.7 km^{2}) near Hendersonville, North Carolina, with scenic Kanuga Lake at its center. Yearly, more than 35,000 guests utilize the facilities, which include the conference center, Camp Kanuga (for boys and girls), Camp Bob, and the Mountain Trail Outdoor School.

Kanuga Conferences Incorporated has EIN 56-0599223 as a 501(c)(3) Public Charity. Kanuga Endowment Inc. has EIN 58-1976605 as a separate 501(c)(3) Public Charity; in 2020 it claimed total revenue of $539,404 and total assets of $5,265,031.

The word kanuga is of Cherokee origin, referring to both a former place of a Cherokee settlement in South Carolina and to a Cherokee tool resembling a short comb with seven teeth used in preparation of players in a Cherokee ritual stick ball game. The description "gathering place" also came to be associated with the term, which led to its selection as the name of a new vacation colony in 1909.

== History ==
=== Kanuga Lake Club ===
Kanuga began in 1909 as Kanuga Lake Club, the dream of George Stephens, a Charlotte banker, real estate developer, and newspaper publisher. Kanuga Lake Club was designed to be a place for families from the "low country" of South Carolina and North Carolina to take vacation. Stephens employed John Nolen as his planner, and Richard Sharp Smith as his architect.

After 950 acres (3.8 km^{2}) were purchased, a dam was built over Mud Creek, creating a lake (much larger than the current Lake Kanuga). Thirty-nine cottages, an inn with dining rooms, and a lakeside pavilion were built, usable only during the summer months. Utilizing his successful businesses, American Trust Company (now Bank of America and his newspapers, the Charlotte Observer, and the Asheville Citizen, Stephens attracted people to Kanuga.

In 1916, tragedy struck. After heavy rains, the dam to Lake Kanuga broke, sending water through Hendersonville and Asheville. Modern innovations such as the automobile also made single destination vacation sites increasingly obsolete. Subsequently, Kanuga went broke and was closed. A new dam that shortened the lake to its present size would eventually be built, but over the following 12 years four attempts at reorganizing the facility ended with four bankruptcies.

=== Episcopal center ===
In 1928, Bishop Kirkman George Finlay of the Episcopal Diocese of Upper South Carolina spearheaded the effort to purchase the land and open a camp and conference center for the North Carolina and South Carolina Episcopal dioceses. Money was raised for the operation, and with the support and backing of the neighboring Episcopal dioceses, the property was purchased and in that summer six weeks of youth and clergy conferences were followed by six weeks of guest period.

Church services were held in outdoor chapels or inside the lounge of the inn until 1940, when the Chapel of the Transfiguration was dedicated in the memory of Bishop Finlay who had died two years earlier. Scottish architect S. Grant Alexander was commissioned to design and build the chapel out of yellow pine wood harvested on the property. The soft wood was not as strong a wood as Alexander had hoped, so support beams were added to prevent the walls from collapsing.

By the 1960s, age and decay were catching up with the original buildings and the inn was torn down and replaced in 1968 by a modern inn and dining area which allowed Kanuga to operate year-round. The original 39 cottages were kept and eventually winterized in the 1990s while retaining their original appearance. Nearly all of the original cottages and the outdoor Chapel of St. Francis are on the National Register of Historic Places as part of the Kanuga Lake Historic District. The district encompasses 40 contributing buildings and 1 contributing site.

From its earliest days, Kanuga has also operated separate overnight summer camps for boys and girls. In 1931, a summer camp facility for boys was built near the inn. A new boys' camp facility was built on another part of the property in 1962, allowing the first facility to be used as a girls' camp. In the 1970s the boys' and girls' camps were combined on the second campus, and the first campus was first rented to the National Wildlife Federation and eventually redesigned as the Bob Campbell Youth Campus for underprivileged children in the summer and as an outdoor education facility throughout the rest of the year. Camp Kanuga currently has 9-day and 13-day sessions for boys and girls ages 7–15. The Trailblazers program is offered to ages 15–17 which includes off-campus rafting and an 8-day hiking adventure on the Appalachian Trail.

Kanuga has continued to grow, adding many buildings for meetings and recreation to the campus facility. Conferences held during the year are sponsored by Kanuga and outside groups, and churches from many denominations within a few hours drive will use the campus for parish weekends in the non-summer months. The House of Bishops of the Episcopal Church have used Kanuga as a multi-day meeting site as have the primates of the Anglican Communion. The seven weeks of summer guest period in July and August attract visitors to capacity each year, including multi-generational families attending since Kanuga's beginning. Guest periods in the fall, Thanksgiving weekend and at Christmas have also proved to be popular.
