= Edward Brickell White =

American architect

- Born: January 29, 1806; South Carolina
- Died: May 10, 1882 (aged 76); New York
- Education: United States Military Academy
- Occupation: Architect
- Buildings: Huguenot Church; Robert William Roper House; Market Hall; St. Philip's Episcopal Church (steeple only); St. Matthew's German Evangelical Lutheran Church (original sanctuary)

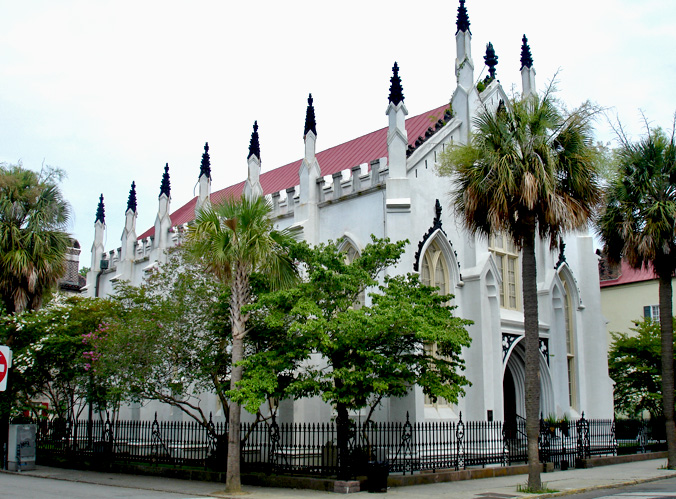
Huguenot Church, Charleston, South Carolina

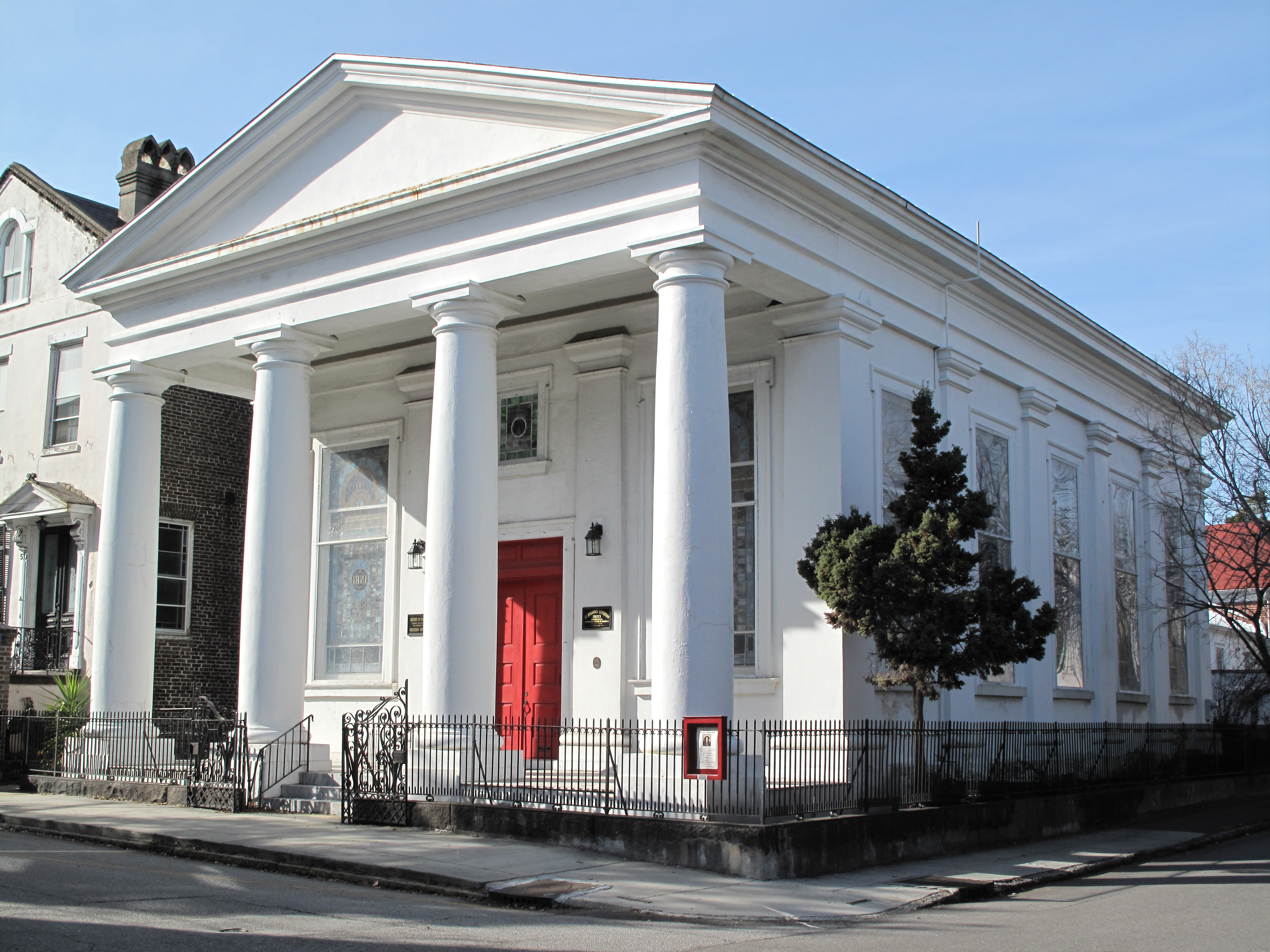
St. Matthew's German Evangelical Lutheran Church original sanctuary 1842, Charleston, SC

Edward Brickell White (January 29, 1806 – May 10, 1882), also known as E. B. White, was an architect in the United States. He was known for his Gothic Revival architecture and his use of Roman and Greek designs.

== Life ==
Edward Brickell White was born on January 29, 1806, on the Chapel Hill Plantation of St. John's Berkeley Parish, South Carolina. His father was the planter and artist, John Blake White, and his mother was Elizabeth Allston White.

In 1826, he graduated from the United States Military Academy, where he studied engineering. He served as a lieutenant in the U.S. Army artillery. On April 8, 1832, he married Delia Adams in New London, Connecticut. Following his resignation in August 1836, he surveyed for several railroads. Later that year he moved to Charleston, South Carolina, to practice architecture, engineering, and surveying.

His first major work was the Greek Revival Market Hall, which is a National Historic Landmark (NHL) in Charleston.

He was the architect of many churches including the Gothic Revival Huguenot Church (NHL) in Charleston; the Gothic Revival Trinity Episcopal Church in Columbia, which is on the National Register of Historic Places (NRHP); the wooden Gothic Revival Church of the Cross (NRHP) in Bluffton; and the steeple of St. Philip's Church (NHL) in Charleston. In 1842, he designed the sanctuary of St. Matthew's German Evangelical Lutheran Church in the Ansonborough section of the city. He was the architect for Grace Church Cathedral (Episcopal) at 98 Wentworth St., Charleston, SC, a Gothic Revival church built in 1847–1848. Likewise, he designed the Centenary Methodist Church at 60 Wentworth St., Charleston, SC in about 1842. In 1841, his design for St. Johannes Lutheran Church, 48 Hasell St., Charleston, SC was built.

The 21 ft (6 m) granite Doric granite column for the Daniel Morgan Monument (NRHP) in Spartanburg, South Carolina, was one of his projects. He designed the Charleston High School, which is currently a private residence, and the Grace Episcopal Church that are contributing properties to the Charleston Historic District (NRHP). He designed a portico with columns and wings for the main building and Gate Lodge of the College of Charleston (NHL). He designed an expansion of a building at South Carolina Military College.

He was the superintending architect for the new Custom House in Charleston, which was designed by Ammi Burnham Young. Construction was halted in 1859 when the US Congress did not appropriate funding to cover cost overruns. A less ambitious design was completed in 1879.

During the Civil War, he joined the Confederate Army, and served at James Island and North Carolina. He rose to the rank of lieutenant colonel, commanding the 3rd South Carolina Artillery.

After the war, E.B. White supervised repairs of St. Michael's Episcopal Church in Charleston. He designed a building for Charleston Gas & Light Co. Among the residences that he designed is the William Gatewood House at 21 Legare Street which was described as "recently built" is a real estate listing in February 1863.

In 1879, White moved to New York and died on May 10, 1882. He was interred in St. Michael's Episcopal Churchyard in Charleston.

== Work ==
- High School of Charleston (1841)
- Old St. Matthew's German Evangelical Lutheran Church (1842)
- Centenary Methodist Church (Charleston, South Carolina) (1842)
- Market Hall and Sheds (1840s)
- Huguenot Church (1844)
- Trinity Episcopal Cathedral (Columbia, South Carolina) (1847)
- Grace Church Cathedral (1848)
- Church of the Cross (1857)
- St. Andrew's Church (Mount Pleasant, South Carolina) (1857)
