= Senator Wagner (disambiguation) =

Robert F. Wagner (1877–1953) was a US Senator from New York from 1927 to 1949.

Senator Wagner may also refer to:

- David Wagner (judge) (1826–1902), Missouri State Senate
- Donald Wagner (Nebraska politician) (1927–2023), Nebraska State Senate
- Frank Wagner (American politician) (born 1955), Virginia State Senate
- George D. Wagner (1829–1869), Indiana State Senate
- Jack Wagner (politician) (born 1948), Pennsylvania State Senate
- Joseph Wagner (New York politician) (1853–1932), New York State Senate
- Joseph Wagner (Wisconsin politician) (1809–1896), Wisconsin State Senate
- Michael J. Wagner (1941–2014), Maryland State Senate
- Rob Wagner (politician) (born 1973), Oregon State Senate
- Scott Wagner (born 1955), Pennsylvania State Senate
- Sue Wagner (1940–2026), Nevada State Senate
- Thomas M. Wagner (c. 1824–1862), South Carolina State Senate
- Webster Wagner (1817–1882), New York State Senate
- William Wagner (philanthropist) (1796–1885), Pennsylvania State Senate

== See also ==
- Richard Van Wagner (1936–2007), New Jersey State Senate
- Senator Wagoner (disambiguation)
