= John Pinckney =

John Pinckney may refer to:

- John M. Pinckney (1845–1905), U.S. Representative from Texas
- John A. Pinckney (1905–1972), American prelate of the Episcopal Church
