= Dorsey F. Henderson Jr. =

The Right Reverend Dorsey Felix Henderson
- Bishop of Upper South Carolina
- Church: Episcopal Church
- Diocese: Upper South Carolina
- Elected: October 1, 1994
- In office: 1995–2009
- Predecessor: William A. Beckham
- Successor: W. Andrew Waldo

Orders
- Ordination: November 1, 1977 by James Duncan
- Consecration: February 3, 1995 by Edmond L. Browning

Personal details
- Born: January 17, 1939 (age 87) Bainbridge, Georgia, United States
- Denomination: Anglican
- Parents: Dorsey Felix Henderson & Murlean New

Dorsey Felix Henderson Jr. (born January 17, 1939) was bishop of the Episcopal Diocese of Upper South Carolina, serving from 1995 to 2009.

== Early life, education and career ==
Henderson was born in 1939 in Bainbridge, Georgia, the son of Dorsey Felix Henderson (1915-1960) and Murlean New (1917-2000). He was raised in Florida. He was educated at Stetson University and the University of Florida. He graduated with a Bachelor of Laws from the University of Florida and became a commissioned officer in the United States Army Intelligence and Security Command. He then studied at the Virginia Theological Seminary, where he earned his Master of Divinity in 1977. He was awarded an honorary Doctor of Divinity from the University of the South in 1996.

== Ordained ministry ==
Henderson was ordained to the diaconate on April 17, 1977, to the priesthood on November 1, 1977. He started as the curate of St Benedict's Church in Plantation, Florida from 1977 till 1980, priest-in-charge of the same church from 1980 till 1981, and then rector of the same church between 1981 and 1990. He was appointed Dean of St Paul's Cathedral in Fond du Lac, Wisconsin, and remained there till 1995.

== Episcopacy ==
On October 1, 1994, Henderson was elected on the sixth ballot as the seventh Bishop of Upper South Carolina, during a diocesan convention. He was consecrated on February 3, 1995, with Presiding Bishop Edmond L. Browning as chief consecrator, in Trinity Cathedral. He addressed his first diocesan convention as bishop of the diocese that same day. In January 2009, Henderson announced his intention of retiring, and officially retired on December 31, 2009. He then became Assistant Bishop of Florida.

== See also ==
- List of Episcopal bishops of the United States
- Historical list of the Episcopal bishops of the United States
