= Clarence Alfred Cole =

Bishop of the Episcopal Diocese of Upper South Carolina

The Right Reverend Clarence Alfred Cole D.D.
- Bishop of Upper South Carolina
- Church: Episcopal Church
- Diocese: Upper South Carolina
- Elected: May 1953
- In office: 1953–1963
- Successor: John J. Gravatt
- Opposed to: John A. Pinckney

Orders
- Ordination: May 1937 by Albert Sidney Thomas
- Consecration: October 20, 1953 by Edwin A. Penick

Personal details
- Born: June 15, 1909 Washington, D.C., United States
- Died: April 11, 1963 (aged 53) Columbia, South Carolina, United States
- Buried: Trinity Cathedral yard
- Denomination: Episcopal
- Parents: Carl Adams Cole & Blanche Margaret Mack
- Spouse: Catherine Tate Powe
- Children: 6

Clarence Alfred Cole (June 15, 1909 – April 11, 1963) was the third bishop of the Episcopal Diocese of Upper South Carolina, serving from 1953 to 1963.

== Early life and education ==
Cole was born in Washington, D.C., on June 15, 1909. He was the son of Carl Adams Cole and Blanche Margaret Mack. He was first educated at public schools of Washington, D.C., before studying at Benjamin Franklin University from where he earned a Bachelor of Science in 1930. In 1933, he attended Duke University and graduated with a Bachelor of Arts. With a Bachelor of Divinity, he graduated in 1936 from the University of the South; he was awarded a Doctor of Divinity from the same university in 1954.

== Ordained ministry ==
Cole was ordained deacon in June 1936 by Bishop James E. Freeman of Washington and priest in May 1937 by Bishop Albert Sidney Thomas of South Carolina. He married Catherine Tate Powe on June 1, 1938, and together had six children. He served as assistant rector of Grace Church in Charleston, South Carolina, from 1936 till 1938, and then as rector of St Stephen's Church in Oxford, North Carolina. In 1941, he became rector of St Martin's Church in Charlotte, North Carolina, before becoming rector of St John's Church in Charleston, West Virginia on March 3, 1952.

== Episcopacy ==
In May 1953, Cole was elected on the fifth ballot as Bishop of Upper South Carolina, during the 31st convention of the diocese. He was consecrated on October 20, 1953, in Trinity Cathedral in Columbia, South Carolina. He died in office in Providence Hospital, Columbia, South Carolina, after suffering from several heart attacks.
