= John J. Gravatt =

American bishop

The Right Reverend John James Gravatt D.D.
- Bishop of Upper South Carolina
- Church: Episcopal Church
- Diocese: Upper South Carolina
- Elected: January 10, 1939
- In office: 1939–1953
- Successor: Kirkman G. Finlay
- Opposed to: Clarence Alfred Cole

Orders
- Ordination: June 18, 1909 by Robert Atkinson Gibson
- Consecration: May 5, 1939 by Henry St. George Tucker

Personal details
- Born: October 3, 1881 Hampton, Virginia, United States
- Died: October 14, 1965 (aged 84) Lexington, Virginia, United States
- Buried: Thornrose Cemetery, Staunton, Virginia
- Denomination: Anglican
- Parents: John James Gravatt & India Wray Jones
- Spouse: Helen Stevens (m. 1922, d. 1947); Anna Louise Bourne Wayland (m. 1960)
- Children: 2

John James Gravatt Jr (October 3, 1881 – October 14, 1965) was the second Bishop of Upper South Carolina in The Episcopal Church.

== Early life and education ==
Gravatt was born on October 3, 1881, in Hampton, Virginia, the son of the Reverend John James Gravatt and India Wray Jones. He was educated at the University of Virginia, from where he earned his Bachelor of Arts in 1903. After that, he enrolled at the Virginia Theological Seminary and graduated with a Bachelor of Divinity in 1908. He was awarded a Doctor of Divinity from the Virginia Seminary in 1933, and another from the University of the South in 1939.

== Ordained ministry ==
Gravatt was ordained deacon in June 1908 by Bishop George William Peterkin of West Virginia, and priest in June 1909 by Bishop Robert Atkinson Gibson of Virginia. He served as secretary to the Christian Missionary Association from 1908 till 1909 and secretary to the Student Board of Missions between 1909 and 1911. In 1911, he became rector of Slaughter Parish in Rapidan, Virginia, while in 1913 he became rector of the Church of the Ascension in Frankfort, Kentucky. During this time, he also served as chaplain in the US Army stationed in France during WWI. Between 1919 and 1939, he served as rector of Trinity Church in Staunton, Virginia.

== Episcopacy ==
On January 10, 1939, during a special convention of the Diocese of Upper South Carolina, held in Trinity Church, Gravatt was elected as the second Bishop of Upper South Carolina on the fourth ballot. He was consecrated on May 5, 1939, by Presiding Bishop Henry St. George Tucker, and co-consecrated by his uncle William Loyall Gravatt of West Virginia. He retired in 1953 and died on October 14, 1965, in Lexington, Virginia due to coronary problems.

== Family ==
Gravatt married Helen Stevens on April 19, 1922, and together had a son who died a day after he was born, and a daughter who lived till 2014. Gravatt remarried after Helen's death in 1947. He married Anna Louise Bourne Wayland, known as Nancy, on February 24, 1960. His uncle was the second Bishop of West Virginia, William Loyall Gravatt.
