= John S. Preston =

American planter, soldier, and attorney (1809–1881)

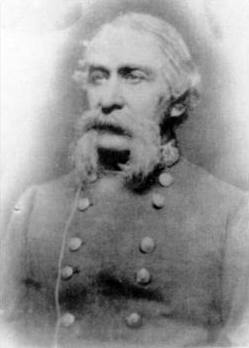
- Brig. Gen. John S. Preston
- Born: April 20, 1809; Abingdon, Virginia, U.S.
- Died: May 1, 1881 (aged 72); Columbia, South Carolina, U.S.
- Burial place: Trinity Cathedral Cemetery, Columbia, South Carolina
- Military career
- Allegiance: Confederate States of America
- Branch: Confederate States Army
- Service years: 1863–1865
- Rank: Brigadier General
- Commands: Bureau of Conscription
- Conflicts: American Civil War
- Other work: Attorney, politician, planter

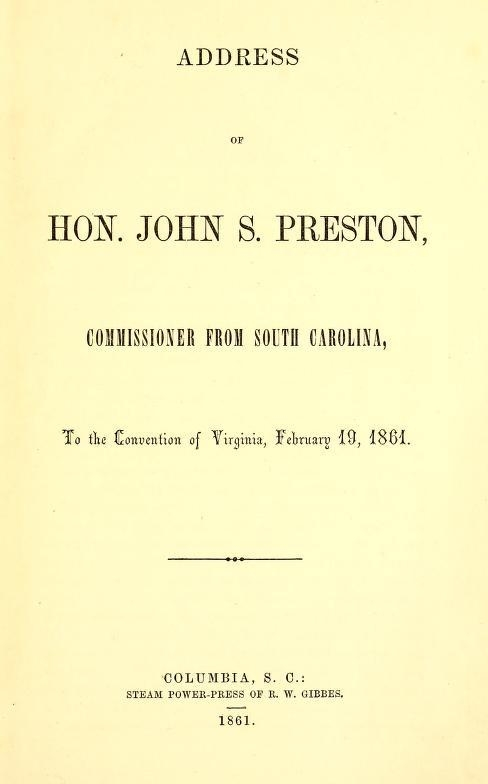
An address delivered by Preston to the Convention of Virginia, February 19, 1861

John Smith Preston (April 20, 1809 – May 1, 1881) was a Confederate general in the American Civil War. He was also a wealthy planter and attorney who became prominent in South Carolina politics in the 19th century. An ardent secessionist, he was the state's delegate dispatched to help convince the Virginia Secession Convention to join South Carolina in seceding from the antebellum Union in the months prior to the start of the American Civil War.

== Biography ==
Preston was born at "Salt Works," a sprawling estate owned by a prominent military family near Abingdon, Virginia. He was a son of General Francis Preston and Sarah Buchanan (Campbell) Preston. He graduated from Hampden-Sydney College in 1824, and then studied law at the University of Virginia and Harvard College. He passed his bar exam and established a practice in Abingdon. On April 28, 1830, he married Caroline Hampton, a daughter of South Carolina's wealthiest planter, Wade Hampton. They eventually had eight children.

Preston took up residence in Columbia, South Carolina, and established a legal practice there. He later invested heavily in a sugar plantation, The Houmas, near Baton Rouge, Louisiana, which prospered and gained him substantial wealth.

Preston joined the Democratic Party and was elected to the South Carolina State Senate for several successive terms, serving from 1848 until 1856. He was a delegate from South Carolina to 1860 Democratic National Convention. He was also the state's delegate dispatched to help convince the Virginia Secession Convention to join South Carolina in seceding from the antebellum Union in the months prior to the start of the Civil War.

During the early part of the war, Preston served as an aide to General P.G.T. Beauregard. He later accepted a commission as an officer in the Confederate Army and headed the bureau of conscription in Richmond. In 1864 he was promoted to brigadier general. His fashionable mansion, the Hampton-Preston House, was seized by the Union Army during the 1865 occupation of Columbia and used as the headquarters of Maj. Gen. John A. Logan.

After the war, Preston traveled to England, not returning to the United States until 1868. He remained a strong defender of the Confederacy until the end of his life.

Preston died in Columbia on May 1, 1881. Interment was at the Trinity Cathedral Cemetery in Columbia.

== See also ==
- List of American Civil War generals (Confederate)
