= Maria Henrietta Pinckney =

American political writer (1782–1836)

- Born: 1782
- Died: May 13, 1836 (aged 53–54)
- Known for: Quintessence of Long Speeches, Arranged as a Political Catechism
- Parents: Charles Cotesworth Pinckney (father); Sarah Middleton Pinckney (mother)

Maria Henrietta Pinckney was an American political writer from Charleston, South Carolina. She is best known for her pamphlet the Quintessence of Long Speeches, Arranged as a Political Catechism, written in response to the 1830 nullification crisis between South Carolina and the federal government due to tariff disputes. Pinckney was born in 1782 and died on May 13, 1836 in her hometown of Charleston.

== Early life ==
Pinckney was the eldest daughter of the wealthy plantation owner Charles Cotesworth Pinckney and Sarah Middleton. Her father served as the United States Minister to France from 1796 to 1797. Maria lost her mother in her early years of childhood and was educated by her grandmother, Eliza Lucas Pinckney.

== Influence and achievements ==
During the 1830 nullification crisis, Pinckney wrote the Quintessence of Long Speeches, Arranged as a Political Catechism which defended states rights and nullification. The pamphlet was published in Charleston 1830, two years after John C. Calhoun's "Exposition and Protest". She posed a series of thirty four questions and answers summarizing the South's case for nullification. She defined the case as, "the Veto of a Sovereign State on an unconstitutional law of Congress". Pinkney called for her fellow South Carolinians to follow the example of "the patriot band who achieved Revolution" in context to the Declaration of Independence, which was crafted during 1776 during the American Revolution fight for independence.

== Later life and death ==
Pinckney was never married. She and her sister Harriet also ran their father's plantations after his death in 1824. Pinckney died after refusing to heed her doctor's advice to go to a cooler climate because, according to a cousin, "her patriotism will not let her travel North of the Potomac." Maria Henrietta Pinckney died on May 13, 1836. After her death, Pinckney was buried in St. Michael's Churchyard in Charleston.
