= Thomas M. Wagner =

American politician

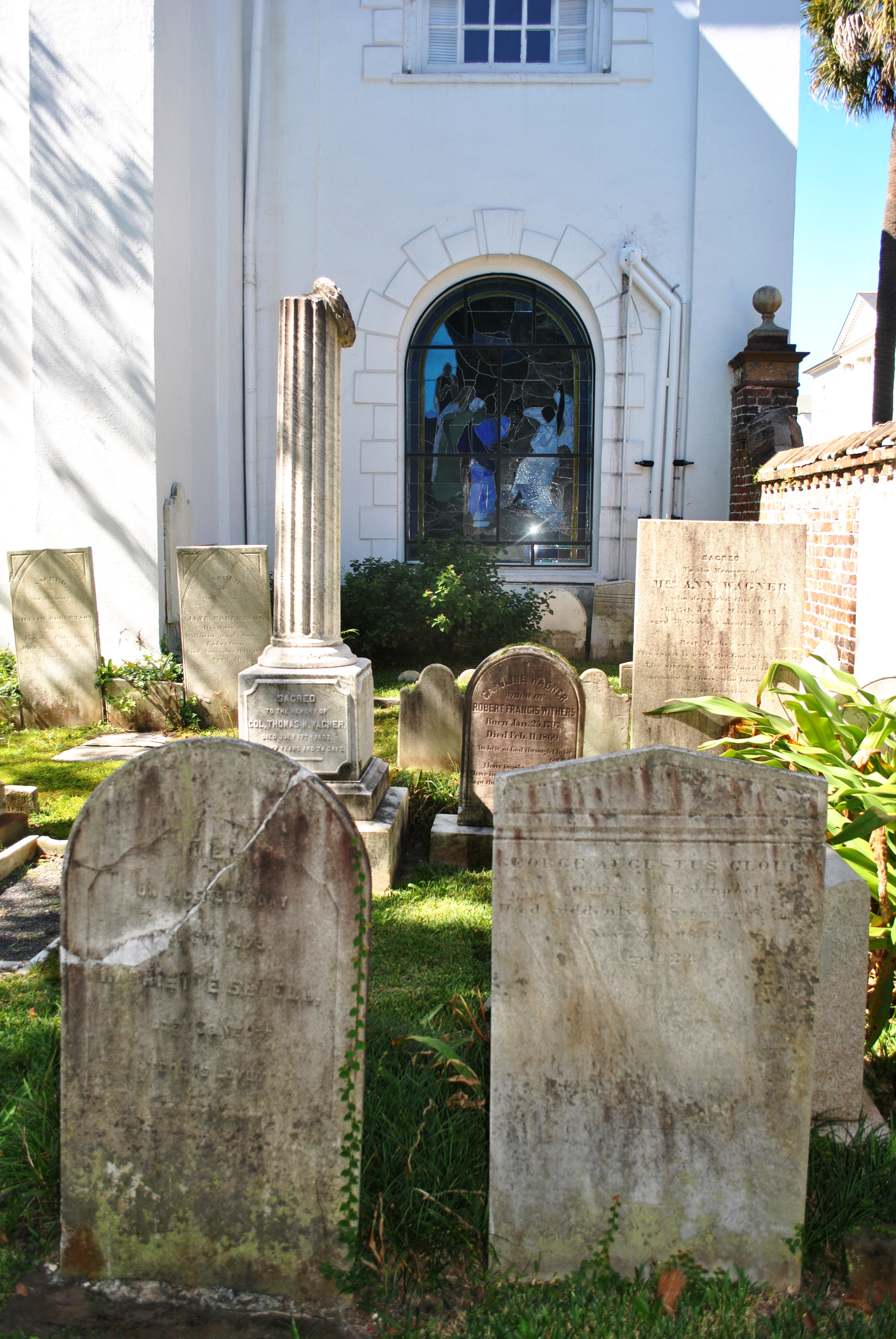
- Thomas M. Wagner's tomb at St Michael's Episcopal Churchyard, Charleston (the white column)
- Born: ca. 1824; Charleston, South Carolina, US
- Died: July 17, 1862; Fort Moultrie, Sullivan's Island, South Carolina, US
- Burial place: St. Michael's Churchyard in Charleston, South Carolina
- Military career
- Allegiance: Confederate States of America
- Branch: Confederate States Army
- Service years: 1861 – 1862
- Rank: Lieutenant Colonel
- Commands: 1st South Carolina Artillery

Thomas M. Wagner (c. 1824 – July 17, 1862) was an American military officer, who held the rank of lieutenant colonel in the Confederate Army during the American Civil War. He was killed when a cannon exploded during an inspection at Fort Moultrie. The main fortification on Morris Island was subsequently named for him and was the site of the First and Second Battle of Fort Wagner.

Before the war, he was a South Carolina state senator and an executive of the Charleston and Savannah Railroad.
