= United States Custom House (Charleston, South Carolina) =

- U.S. Customhouse
- U.S. National Register of Historic Places
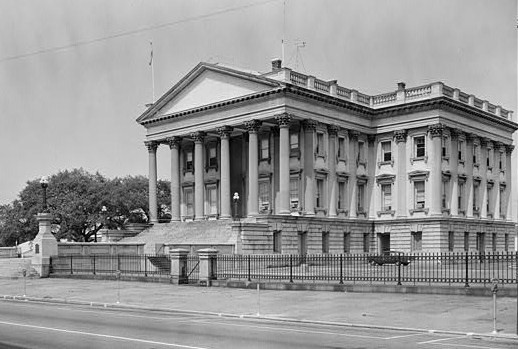
- U.S. Custom House in 1958

- Location within South Carolina Location within the United States
- Location: 200 E. Bay St., Charleston, South Carolina
- Coordinates: 32°46′50″N 79°55′37″W
- Built: 1852
- Architect: Ammi Burnham Young; Multiple
- Architectural style: Early Republic, Roman revival
- NRHP reference No.: 74001834
- Added to NRHP: October 09, 1974

The U.S. Custom House or U.S. Customhouse is the custom house in Charleston, South Carolina. Construction began in 1852, but was interrupted in 1859 due to costs and the possibility of South Carolina's secession from the Union. After the Civil War, construction was restarted in 1870 and completed in 1879. The building was placed on the National Register of Historic Places on October 9, 1974. It is also a contributing property of the Charleston Historic District.

== Design competition ==
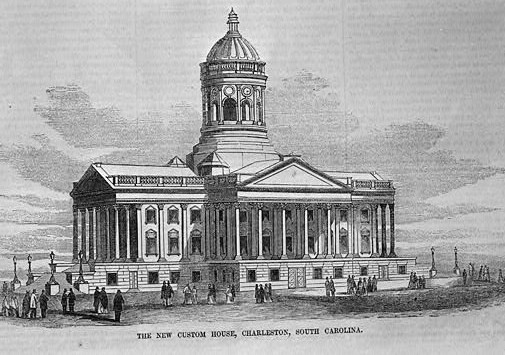
Drawing of the original design

In the tense pre-Civil War period, the federal government felt that building a new custom house in Charleston to replace the Old Custom House would be a positive sign to South Carolina. A design competition with a US$300 prize was announced. About ten architects submitted entries. The four known entrants were three Charlestonian architects: Edward Brickell White, Edward C. Jones, and Peter H. Hammarskold and one Savannah, Georgia architect, John S. Norris. Noted New York architect, James Renwick submitted a late entry, which was returned. The commission judging the entries selected the Jones design and submitted the plans to the Secretary of the Treasury in Washington, DC.

There was lobbying while the decision was being made. Robert Mills submitted plans to the Secretary. Eventually, Ammi Burnham Young was selected to produce a new design incorporating features of the four competitive entries. White was appointed the superintending architect. Jones, Hammarskold, Norris, and White were awarded US$200 for their entries.

The final plans were for a two-story, cross-shaped building with an elevated, rusticated basement. It was to be 259 ft (79 m) from west to east and 152 ft (46 m) from north to south. The west and east arms had Roman porticoes supported by Corinthian limestone columns and steps down to grade. The north and south arms were porticoes. The walls had Corinthian engaged columns between the windows. There was a dome supported by Corinthian columns. The building was to be 160 ft (49 m) above grade. Except for the change from Doric to Corinthian order and for the high dome, the building bore resemblance to the Boston Customhouse that Young had recently designed.

== Pre-Civil War construction ==
Land was purchased at Fitzsimons' Wharf at East Bay and Market. Construction started in 1853 under White's direction. Since the location was marshy, 7,000 piles that were 40 ft (12 m) long were driven into the sand and were cut off at grade. A grillage or network of timber was laid. and a thick bed of concrete was constructed for the foundation. The granite walls of the basement were finished by 1855. After the marble-faced walls were erected, the columns were begun in 1858.

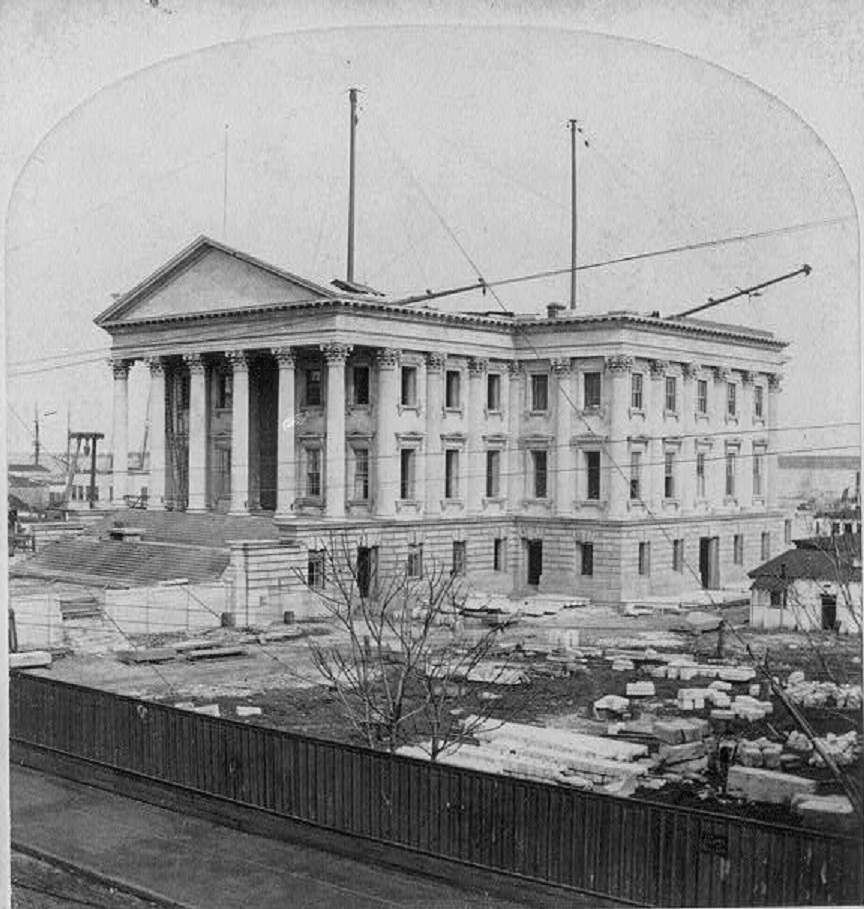
Charleston, S.C.: Custom House (under construction) 1853

In 1859, there was increasing concern in Congress over the possible secession of South Carolina and the costs of construction. Representative John Letcher from Virginia called for a cessation of construction. Representative William Porcher Miles defended the construction with little enthusiasm. No funds were appropriated to continue construction in 1859.

White proposed eliminating the costly dome and replacing it with skylights. With the possibility of war, Congress only appropriated funds for protecting the construction from rain.

== Post-Civil War construction ==
During the war, the building was damaged by shelling. In 1870, construction resumed. The original marble came from Hastings, New York. Because that quarry was abandoned, new marble was obtained from Tuckahoe, New Jersey. Alfred B. Mullett prepared revised drawings. Alterations made at his direction included the loss of the dome, the elimination of the north and south porticoes, and changes to the west entrance. The dome in Ammi B. Young's original design was replaced in 1876 with skylights that covered a two-story, square cortile or inside patio. Fluted Corinthian columns surround the iron second floor gallery. The gallery is ornamented with fluted pilasters. The north and south porticoes were probably converted to office space at this stage.

The windows are rectangular with pediments. The portico entrance doors are also pediment-ed. The buildings were topped with an entablature with architrave and an unadorned frieze with a dentiled cornice. The building has a low roof with an open balustrade.

Construction was completed in 1879. The total cost of construction was about US$2,806,000.

== Later history ==
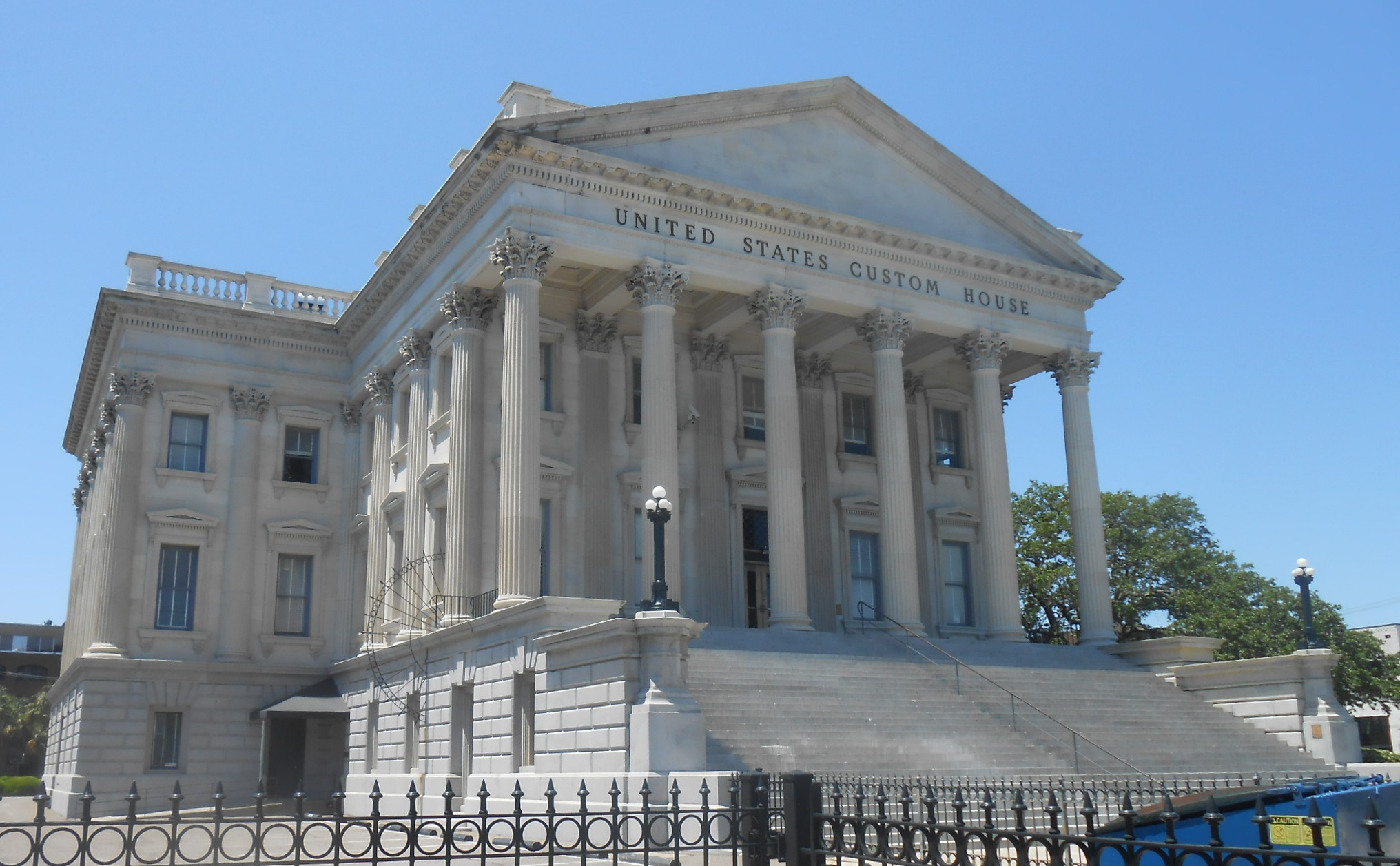
The steps on the east facade, shown here in 2014, are frequently used as seating for special events.

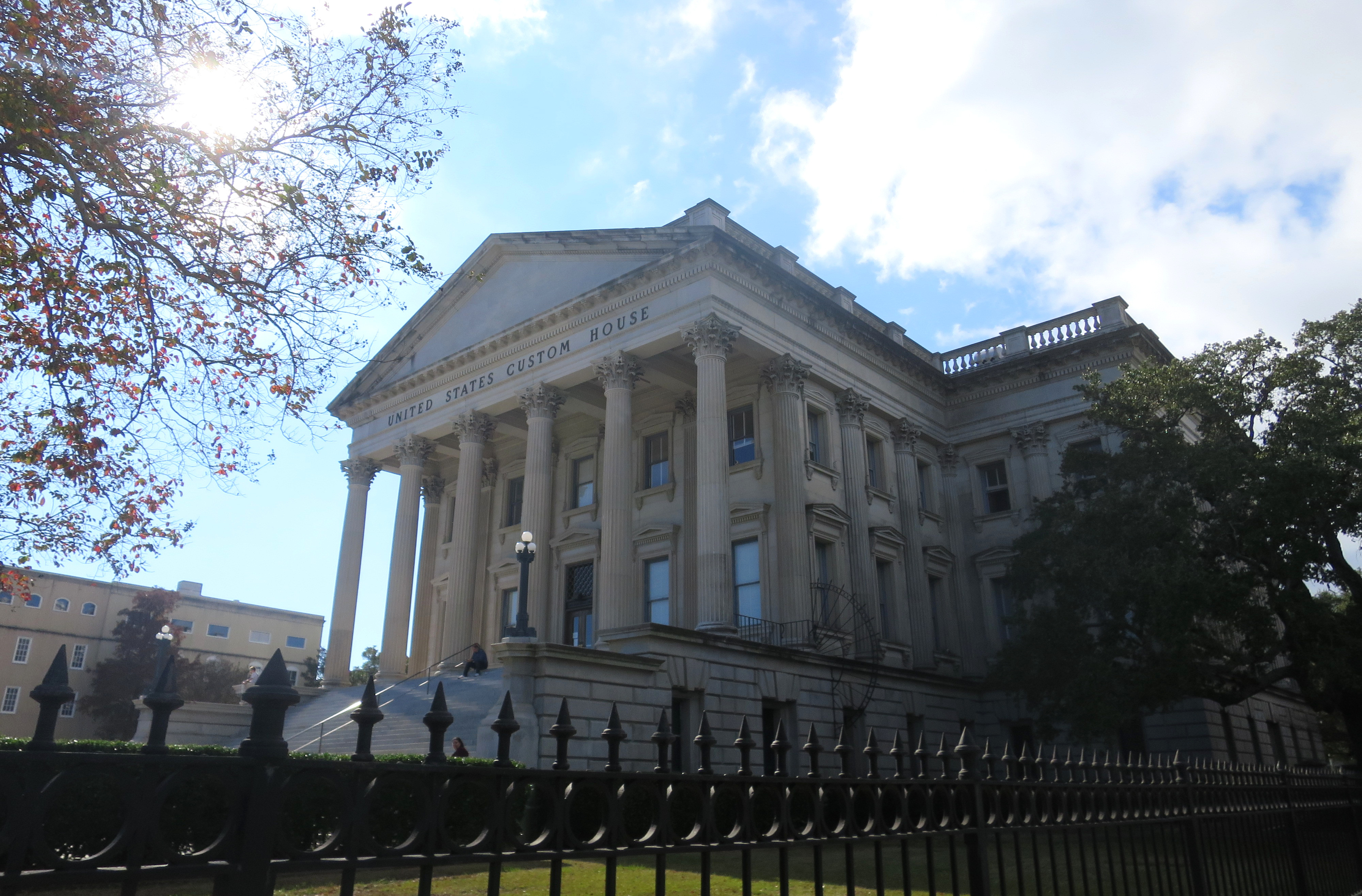
Another view of the east facade in 2025.

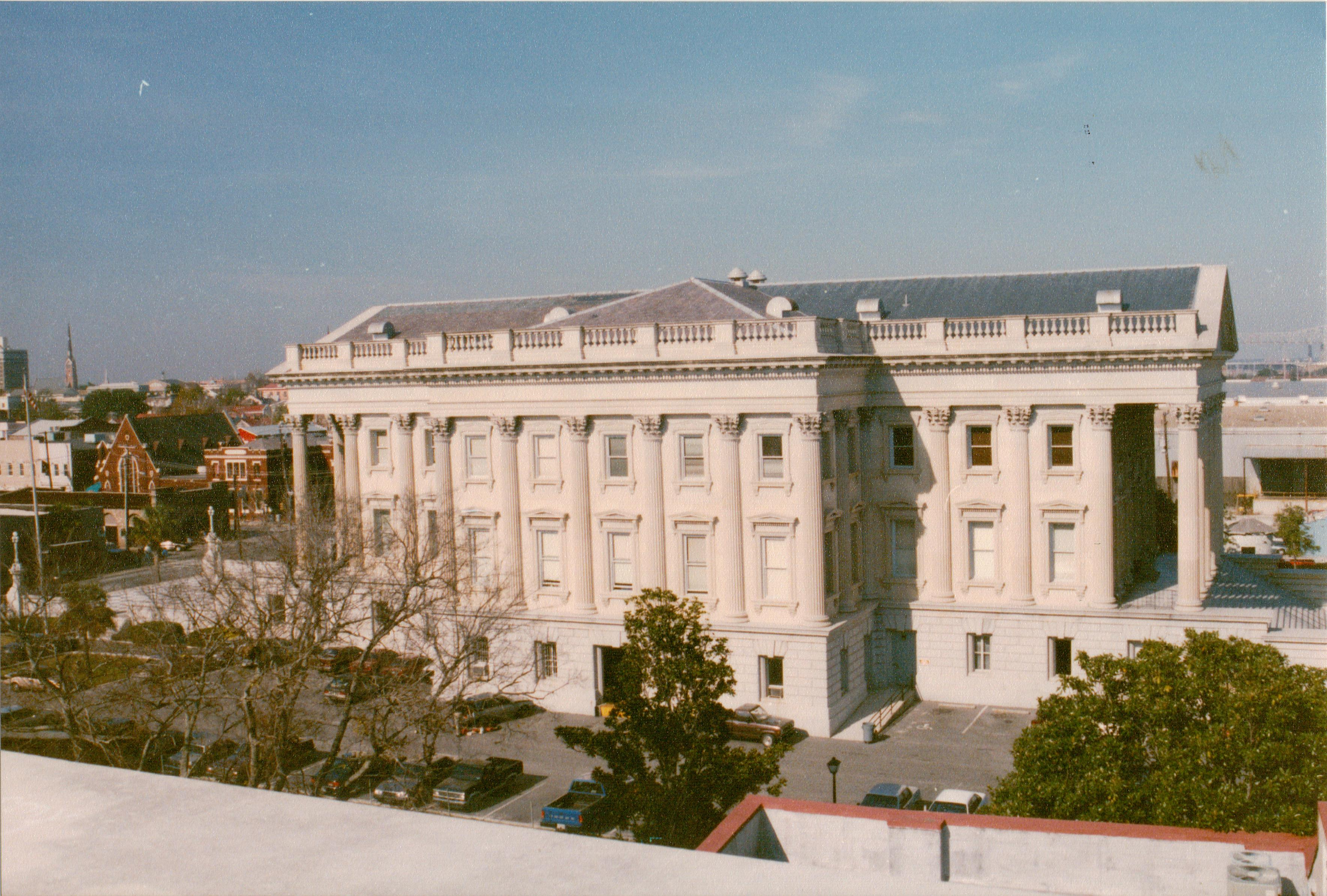
U. S. Custom House, Charleston, S. C. exterior 1991

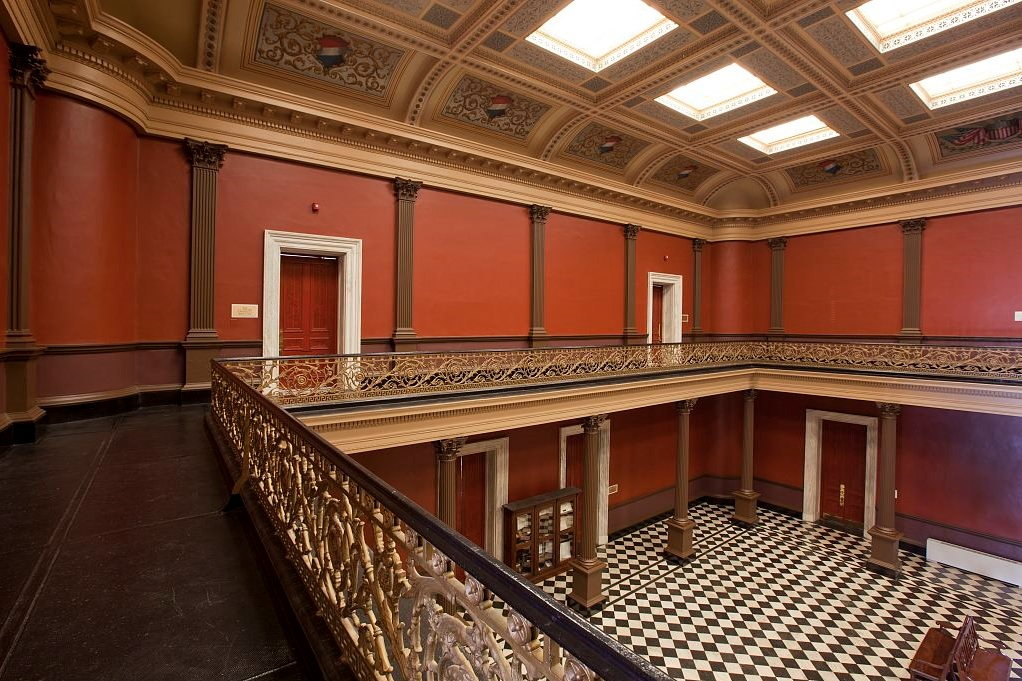
U. S. Custom House, Charleston, S. C. 2nd floor cortile. Gift, Carol M. Highsmith 2009

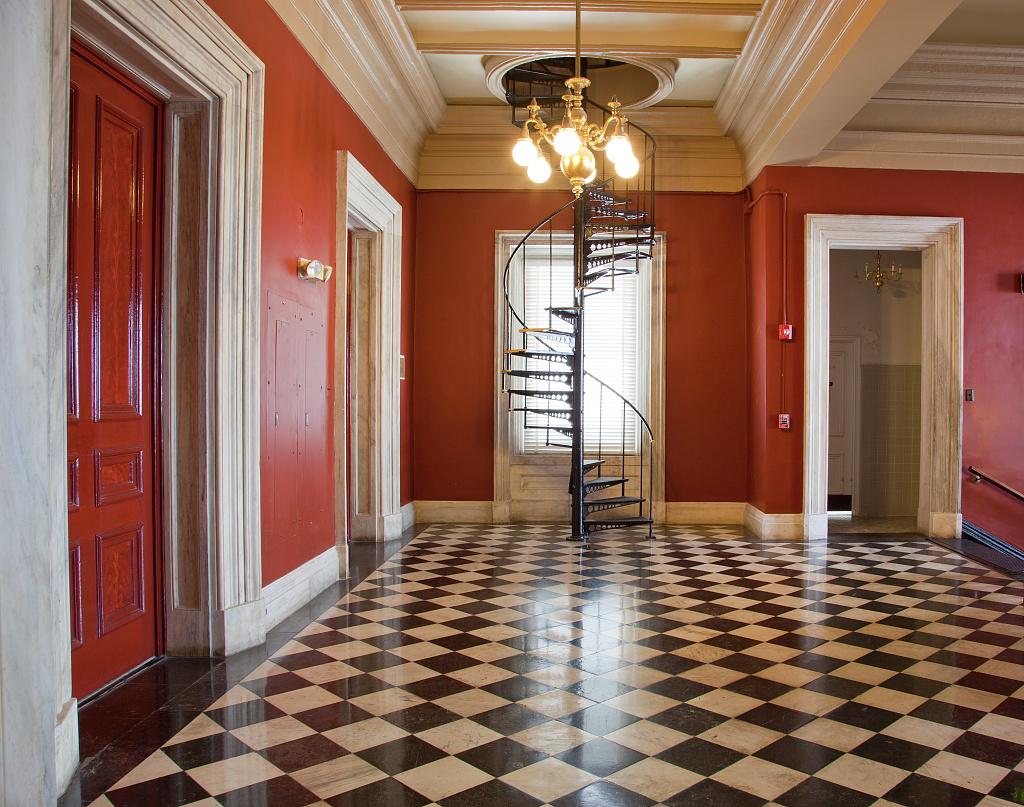
Corridor, U. S. Custom House, Charleston, S. C.

It is possible that the north and south portico were enclosed to increase office space in repairs after the 1886 Charleston earthquake.

In 1906, a heating system replaced the use of stoves and coal grates. In 1910, plumbing and electrical lighting were installed.

By the 1960s, the Custom House was used by a number of federal agencies. Threatened with demolition, local preservationists with the help of Representative Mendel Rivers worked to save the building.

In 1964, "UNITED STATES CUSTOM HOUSE" was engraved in the frieze above the west portico. In 1968, over US$212,000 was spent on restoration.
