= Daniel Morgan Monument =

- U.S. National Register of Historic Places
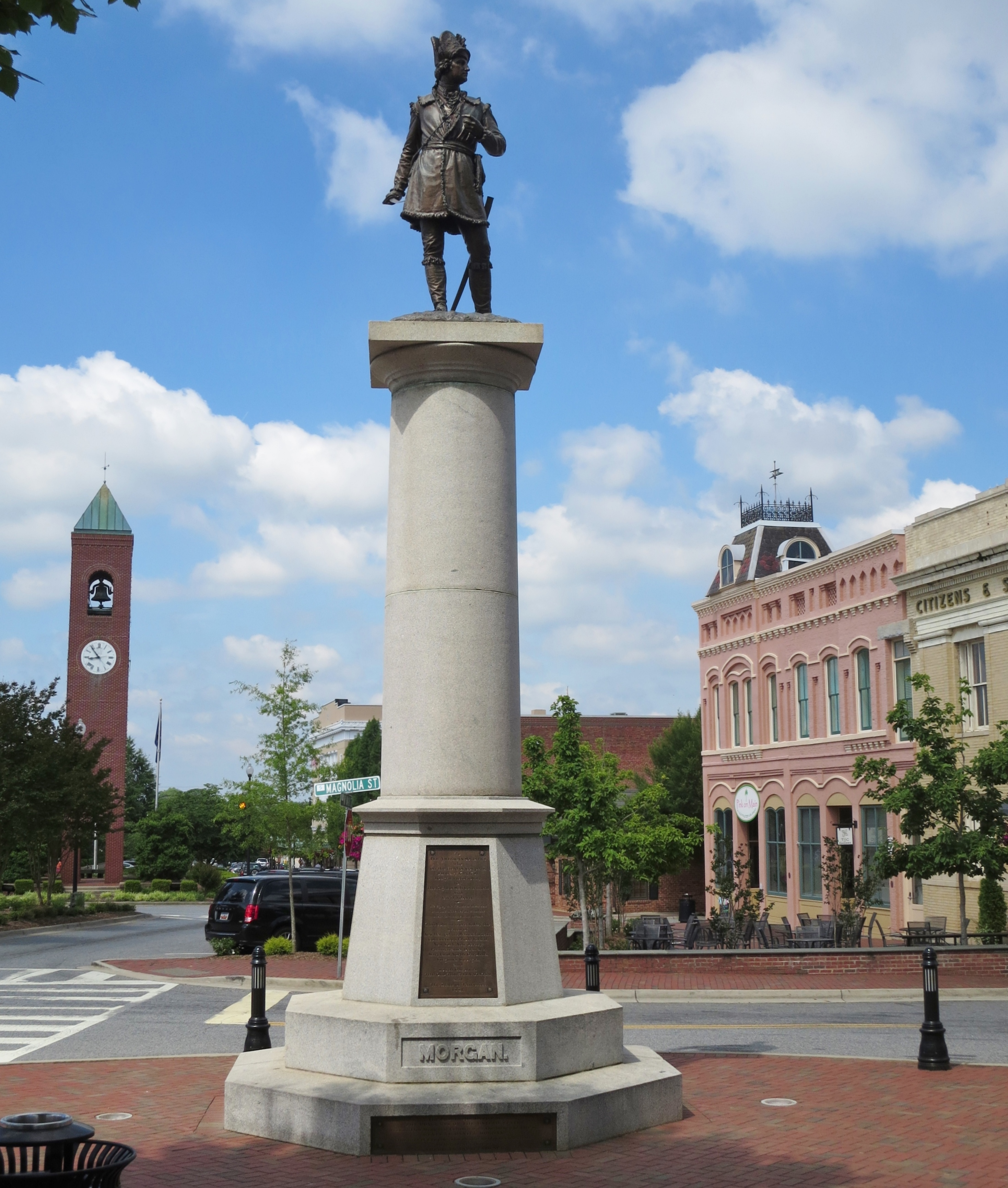
- Daniel Morgan Monument, May 2015

- Location within South Carolina Location within the United States
- Location: Main and Church Sts., Spartanburg, South Carolina
- Coordinates: 34°56′58″N 81°55′55″W
- Area: 0.1 acres (0.040 ha)
- Built: 1881
- Architect: Ward, John Quincy Adams; White, Edward Brickell
- NRHP reference No.: 80003711
- Added to NRHP: September 22, 1980

Daniel Morgan Monument is a historic monument located at Spartanburg, Spartanburg County, South Carolina. The statue was designed by John Quincy Adams Ward and the monument erected in 1881. The monument commemorates the centennial of the victory at the Revolutionary War Battle of Cowpens and its hero, General Daniel Morgan. The statue stands on a columnar granite shaft on an octagonal base designed by noted Charleston architect, Edward Brickell White. In 1960, the monument was moved about 100 yards across Morgan Square to its east end. However, in 2005 as part of a larger project involving the redesign and reconstruction of Morgan Square, the monument was returned to its original position at the corner of West Main and Magnolia Streets and its original orientation, facing Cowpens National Battlefield.

It was listed on the National Register of Historic Places in 1980.
