= Senator Wagoner =

Senator Wagoner may refer to:

- Keith Wagoner (born 1961), Washington State Senate
- Mark Wagoner (born 1971), Ohio State Senate
- Thomas Wagoner (born 1942), Alaska State Senate

== See also ==
- J. T. Waggoner (born 1937), Alabama State Senate
- Senator Wagner (disambiguation)
