= St. Michael's Churchyard, Charleston =

Cemetery in Charleston, South Carolina, US

Coordinates: 32°46′34″N 79°55′50″W

St. Michael's Churchyard, adjacent to historic St. Michael's Episcopal Church on the corner of Meeting and Broad Streets, in Charleston, South Carolina is the final resting place of some famous historical figures, including two signers of the Constitution of the United States. The church was established in 1751 as the second Anglican parish in Charleston, South Carolina.

Interred in St. Michael's Churchyard are:

- Charles Cotesworth Pinckney (1746–1825) Colonel in the Continental Army, member of the U.S. Constitutional Convention and signer of the U.S. Constitution, U.S. Minister to France, Federalist candidate for vice president, and later candidate for President of the United States in 1804 and 1808. Also interred is Pinckney's daughter, Maria Henrietta Pinckney, who wrote Quintessence of Long Speeches, Arranged as a Political Catechism in response to the 1830 nullification crisis.
- John Rutledge (1739–1800) Governor of South Carolina, 1779, member of the U.S. Constitutional Convention and signer of the U.S. Constitution, Chief Justice of U.S. Supreme Court
- Robert Young Hayne (1791–1839) Senator, Governor of South Carolina, and mayor of Charleston
- Arthur Peronneau Hayne (c. 1789–1867) U.S. Senator from South Carolina
- William Dickinson Martin (1789–1833) U.S. Congressman from South Carolina
- Mordecai Gist (1742–1792) American Revolutionary War general
- Thomas M. Wagner, Civil War Lieutenant Colonel and namesake for Battery Wagner.
- Henrietta Johnston and her second husband

Across the street is St. Michael's Church Cemetery. Interred here is Francis Kinloch (1755–1826) a delegate to Second Continental Congress from South Carolina.

J. A. W. Iusti, Frederick Julius Ortmann, and Christopher Werner were three German born forgers of wrought iron in Charleston. Iusti's creation of the St. Michael's Cemetery Gate "Sword Gate" is one of the two most notable iron gates in Charleston, the other being the "Sword Gate" by Werner.

== See also ==
- List of burial places of justices of the Supreme Court of the United States
