= W. Andrew Waldo =

American Episcopal bishop

The Right Reverend William Andrew Waldo M.Div.
- Bishop of Upper South Carolina
- Church: Episcopal Church
- Diocese: Upper South Carolina
- Elected: December 12, 2009
- In office: 2010–2022
- Predecessor: Dorsey F. Henderson Jr.
- Successor: Daniel Richards

Orders
- Ordination: April 1989
- Consecration: May 22, 2010 by Katharine Jefferts Schori

Personal details
- Born: July 17, 1953 (age 72) Douglas, Georgia, United States
- Denomination: Anglican
- Spouse: Mary Halverson
- Children: 3

William Andrew Waldo (born July 17, 1953) is a retired bishop in the Episcopal Church. He served as the eighth bishop of the Episcopal Diocese of Upper South Carolina from 2010 to 2022.

== Biography ==
Waldo was born on July 17, 1953, in Douglas, Georgia, and raised in Montgomery, Alabama. He was educated at Indian Springs School. He has a Bachelor of Arts from Whittier College, a Master of Music from the New England Conservatory of Music, and a Master of Divinity from the University of the South.

Waldo was ordained deacon in June 1988 and priest in April 1989. He served as curate at Grace Church in Manchester, New Hampshire and then rector of St Mark's Church in LaGrange, Georgia. He also served as rector of Trinity Church in Excelsior, Minnesota from 1994 till 2010. He was also a member of the Minnesota Diocesan Council, Constitution and Canons Committee, Standing Committee, Liturgy and Music Commissions of Minnesota, Atlanta, and New Hampshire, and Diocesan Board of Examining Chaplains.

On December 12, 2009, Waldo was elected Bishop of Upper South Carolina on the third ballot, during a diocesan convention held in Trinity Cathedral. He was consecrated on May 22, 2010. On June 6, 2020, he announced plans to retire at the end of 2021. Waldo was succeeded by Daniel P. Richards as bishop on February 26, 2022.

== See also ==
- List of Episcopal bishops of the United States
- Historical list of the Episcopal bishops of the United States
