= John A. Pinckney =

American bishop (1905–1972)

The Right Reverend John Adams Pinckney D.D.
- Bishop of Upper South Carolina
- Church: Episcopal Church
- Diocese: Upper South Carolina
- Elected: May 7, 1963
- In office: 1963–1972
- Successor: Clarence Alfred Cole
- Opposed to: George Moyer Alexander

Orders
- Ordination: May 1933 by Albert Sidney Thomas
- Consecration: September 18, 1963 by M. George Henry

Personal details
- Born: March 8, 1905 Mount Pleasant, South Carolina, United States
- Died: December 7, 1972 (aged 67) Columbia, South Carolina, United States
- Buried: Trinity Cathedral yard
- Denomination: Anglican
- Parents: Francis Douglas Pinckney & Mary Lee Adams
- Spouse: Hilda W. Emerson
- Children: 3
- Education: University of the South

John Adams Pinckney (March 8, 1905 – December 7, 1972) was an American prelate of the Episcopal Church, who served as the forth Bishop of Upper South Carolina.

== Early life and education ==
Pinckney was born in Mount Pleasant, South Carolina on March 8, 1905, the son of Francis Douglas Pinckney and Mary Lee Adams. He studied at College of Charleston between 1925 and 1926, and then at the DuBose Middle School in Summerville, South Carolina between 1926 and 1928. He graduated with a Bachelor of Divinity from the University of the South in 1931, and was awarded a Doctor of Divinity in 1964. He married Hilda W. Emerson on October 8, 1931, and together had three children.

== Ordained ministry ==
Pinckney was ordained deacon in June 1931 and priest in May 1933 by the Bishop of South Carolina Albert Sidney Thomas. Between 1931 and 1937, he served as rector of the Church of the Holy Communion in Allendale, South Carolina and of the Church of the Holy Apostles in Barnwell, South Carolina. He subsequently also was priest-in-charge of the Church of the Heavenly Rest in Garnett, South Carolina, and of St Alban's Mission in Blackville, South Carolina.

In 1937, he became rector of the Church of Holy Cross in Tryon, North Carolina, while in 1939, he became rector of St Paul's Church in Charleston, South Carolina. Between 1941 and 1948, he served as minister at Holy Trinity Church in Clemson, South Carolina and as Episcopal chaplain at Clemson College. In 1948, he became rector of St James' Church in Greenville, South Carolina, while in 1959, he was appointed Archdeacon of Upper South Carolina.

== Episcopacy ==
On May 7, 1963, Pinckney was elected on the second ballot, as the fifth Bishop of Upper South Carolina, during the annual convention of the diocese, held in the Church of the Good Shepherd, Columbia, South Carolina. He was consecrated on September 18, 1963, in Trinity Cathedral, by Bishop M. George Henry of Western North Carolina. Pinckney died in office in 1972 due to coronary complications.
