= Huguenot Church =

Historic church in South Carolina, United States

- U.S. National Register of Historic Places
- U.S. National Historic Landmark
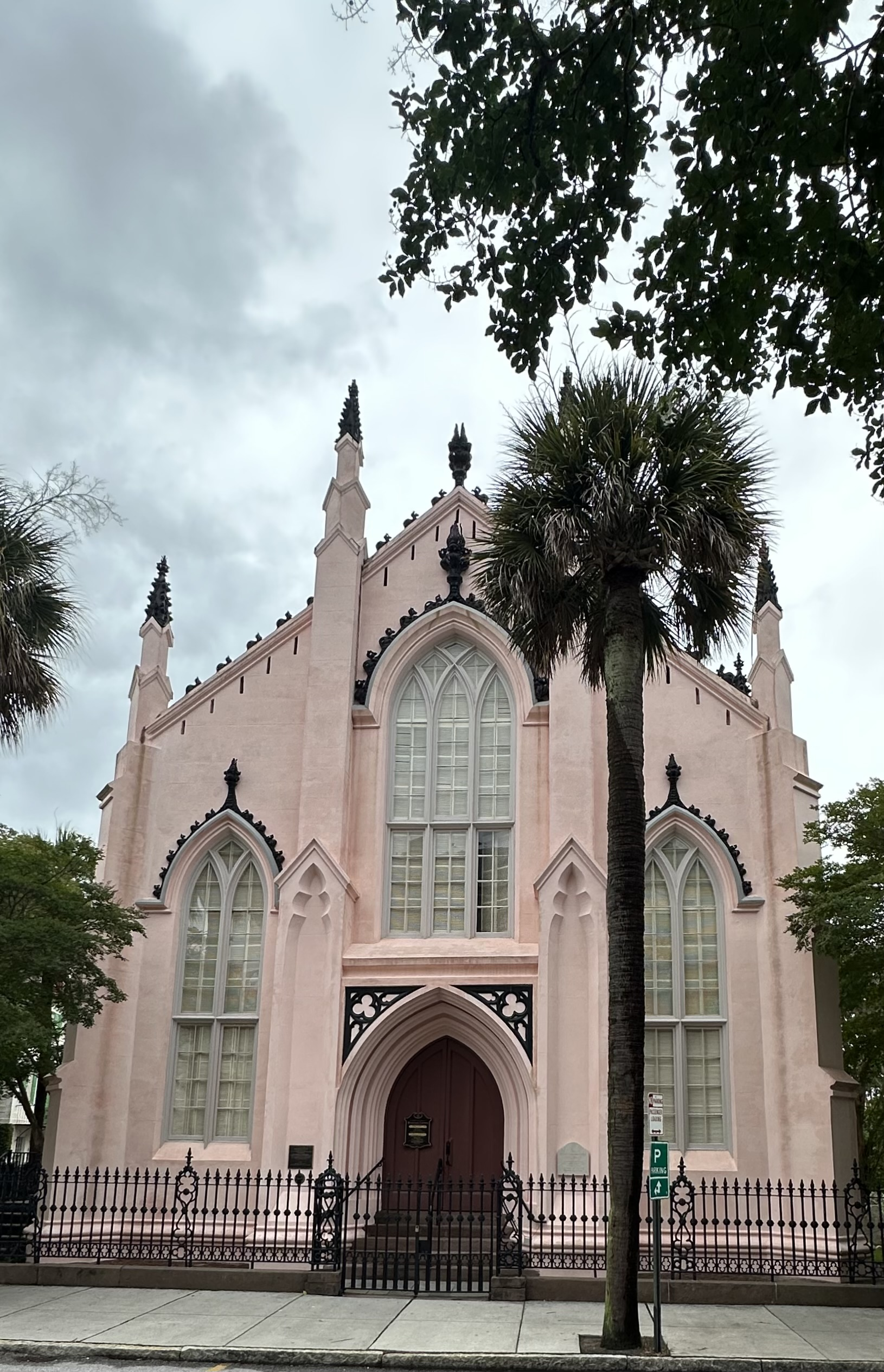
- Huguenot Church in 2026

- Location within South Carolina Location within the United States
- Interactive map showing the location of Huguenot Church
- Location: 136 Church St., Charleston, South Carolina
- Coordinates: 32.7782°N 79.9291°W
- Built: 1844, consecrated 1845
- Architect: E. B. White (architect)
- Architectural style: Gothic Revival church
- NRHP reference No.: 73001687

Significant dates
- Added to NRHP: November 7, 1973
- Designated NHL: November 7, 1973

The Huguenot Church, also called the French Huguenot Church or the French Protestant Church, is a non-denominational Protestant church located at 136 Church Street in Charleston, South Carolina. Built in 1844 and designed by architect Edward Brickell White, it is the oldest Gothic Revival church in South Carolina, and has been designated a National Historic Landmark and listed on the National Register of Historic Places. The congregation it serves traces its origins to the 1680s, and is the only independent Huguenot church in the United States.

As Protestants in predominantly Catholic France, Huguenots faced persecution throughout the 16th and 17th centuries. Following the Revocation of the Edict of Nantes in 1685, many Huguenots fled France for various parts of the world, including Charleston. The early congregation of Charleston's Huguenot Church included many of these refugees, and their descendants continued to play a role in the church's affairs for many decades. The church was originally affiliated with the Calvinist Reformed Church of France, and its doctrine still retains elements of Calvinist doctrine. The church's services still follow 18th century French liturgy, but are conducted in English.

The church is located in the area of Charleston known as the French Quarter, which was given this name in 1973 as part of preservation efforts. It recognizes that the area had a historically high concentration of French merchants. Peter Manigault, once the wealthiest man in the British North American colonies, is buried in the church cemetery.

== History ==
The Huguenots, who were French Calvinists who faced suppression in France, began to settle in other areas in the sixteenth century, founding such failed colonies as Fort Caroline in Florida and Charlesfort in modern South Carolina, as well as settling in established areas, such as South Africa, Britain, and existing colonies such as New Netherlands and Virginia. In 1598, King Henry IV of France issued the Edict of Nantes, granting certain rights and protections to the Huguenots. This edict was revoked by Louis XIV in 1685, prompting an exodus of Huguenots from France.

Huguenot cross

A group of 45 Huguenots arrived in Charleston in April 1680, having been sent to the colony by the English King Charles II to work as artisans, and began holding sporadic services the following year. The Reverend Phillip Trouillard is believed to have conducted the first service. In 1687, Elias Prioleau became the church's first regular pastor. Prioleau had been pastor of a church in the French town of Pons before his church was torn down in 1685. Prioleau remained pastor of the Charleston Huguenot Church until his death in 1699.

Families associated with the church in its early decades included the Gourdin, Ravenel, Porcher, de Saussure, Huger, Mazyck, Lamar and Lanier families, though the church's early years have been difficult to document due to the loss of its early records in a fire in 1740. Families associated with the church in later years included the Bacot, de la Plaine, Maury, Gaillard, Meserole, Macon, Gabeau, Cazenove, L'Hommedieu, L'Espenard, Serre, Marquand, Bavard, Boudouin, Marion, Laurens, Boudinot, Gibert, Robert, and Fontaine families. Huguenots continued to migrate to Carolina throughout the first half of the 18th century, though most of their congregations were gradually absorbed into the Episcopal Church.

The first Huguenot Church, located at the site of the present church, was blown up by city authorities in an effort to stop a spreading fire. It was replaced by a simple brick church in 1800. This building was torn down in 1844 to make way for the present church, which was completed the following year. This third church sustained damage during the Civil War and the Charleston Earthquake of 1886, and was restored with funds from Huguenot descendant Charles Lanier of New York. The church is surrounded by a graveyard where many Huguenots are buried.

Due to a decline in membership in the early 19th century, the church began translating its French liturgy into English in 1828. With the new English liturgy, an elaborate new building, and charismatic 19th century pastors such as Charles Howard and Charles Vedder, church membership and attendance increased.

By 1912, membership had again declined, and for most of the 20th century, the church was not used for regular religious services. The local community of Huguenot descendants did occasionally open it for weddings, organ recitals, and some occasional services organized by the Huguenot Society of South Carolina. Today's congregation dates from 1983.

== Design and construction ==
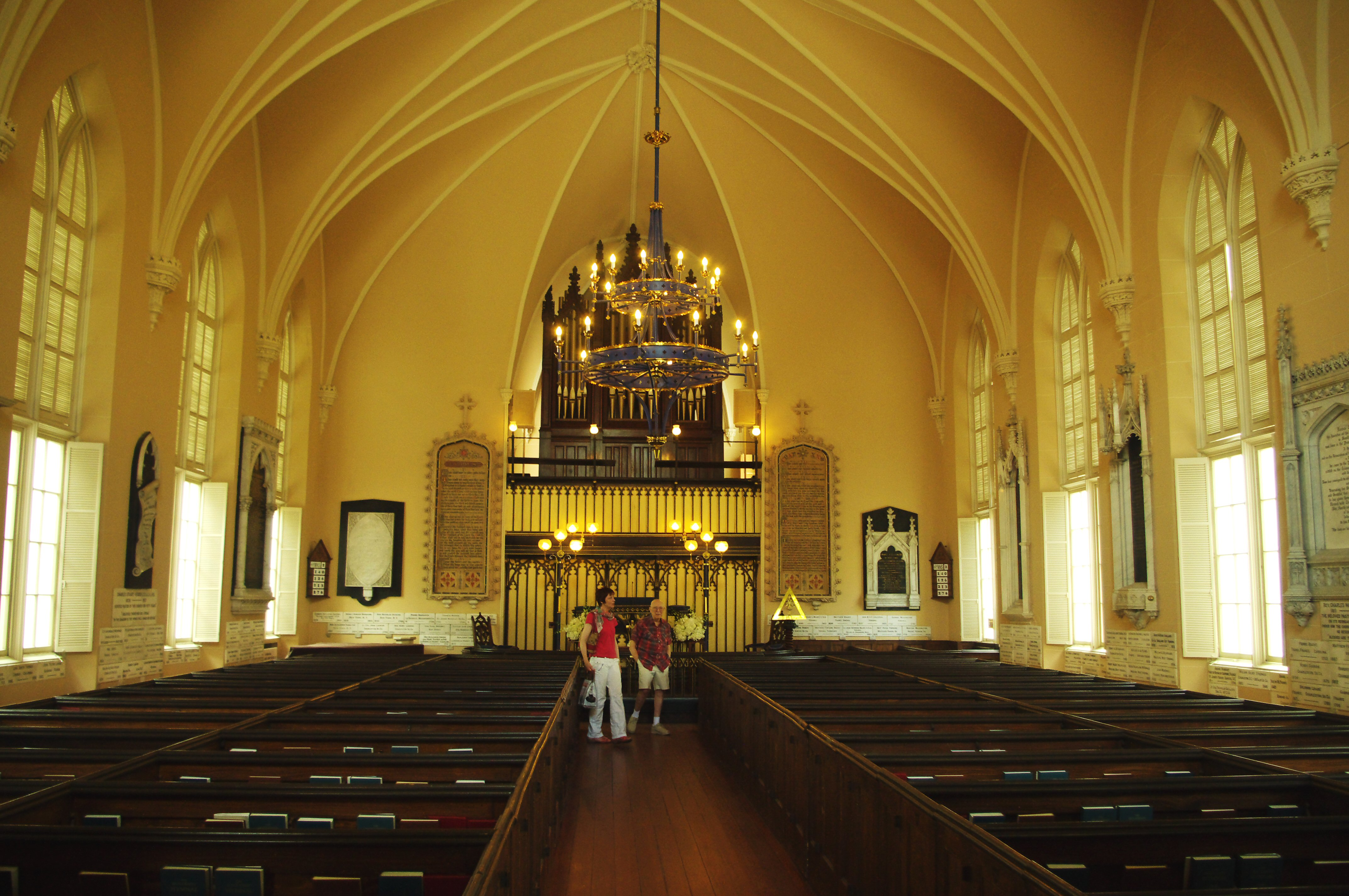
The church's interior

The present church was designed by Edward Brickell White, a local architect who had also designed a number of Greek and Roman buildings in the area, most notably Market Hall, the steeple of St. Philip's Episcopal Church, and the St. Matthew's German Evangelical Lutheran Church. The church was built by local contractor Ephraim Curtis.

The church is a stuccoed brick structure, three bays wide and six bays long, with each bay divided by narrow buttresses topped by elaborate pinnacles. The three front windows are topped with cast-iron crockets, and a battlement parapet surrounds the top of the church. The interior consists of walls with plaster ribbed grained vaulting, with marble tablets etched with names of Huguenot families.

The church's organ, purchased in 1845, is a unique tracker organ designed by New York organ maker Henry Erben (1801–1883). The "tracker" connects the keys and pipe valves, and responds to the organist faster than modern mechanisms. The organ's tone is similar to organs used during the Baroque period.

== Current use ==
The church now holds regular services, which are in English, although since 1950 an annual service each April has been conducted featuring French liturgical reading to commemorate the adoption of the Edict of Nantes, which occurred in April 1598. The congregation still teaches Calvinist doctrine, and its liturgical services are derived from those developed by Neufchâtel and Vallangin, from 1737 and 1772, respectively. The church is governed by a board of directors and body of elders.

== See also ==
- Reformed Church of France
- French Confession of Faith
- List of Huguenots
- Bible translations into French
- List of National Historic Landmarks in South Carolina
- National Register of Historic Places listings in Charleston, South Carolina
