= Diocese of Upper South Carolina =

Episcopal Church diocese in the US

Coordinates: 34.0013°N 81.0303°W

Location
- Country: United States
- Ecclesiastical province: Province IV

Statistics
- Congregations: 62 (2024)
- Members: 20,723 (2025)

Information
- Denomination: Episcopal Church
- Established: October 10, 1922
- Cathedral: Trinity Cathedral

Current leadership
- Bishop: The Rt. Rev. Daniel P. Richards

Map
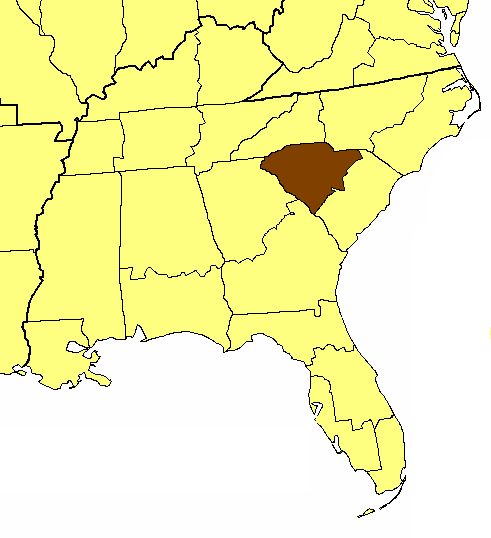
- Location of the Diocese of Upper South Carolina

Website
- edusc.org

The Episcopal Diocese of Upper South Carolina (EDUSC) is a diocese of the Episcopal Church. In 2024, the diocese reported average Sunday attendance (ASA) of 5,221 persons, down from 7,108 in 2015. The diocese's 2025 membership statistics showed 20,723 members, a decrease from 23,858 in 2015. As of 2026, there are 62 congregations in the diocese. The 59 reporting congregations of the diocese had $22,909,910 in plate and pledge income in 2024.

Originally part of the Diocese of South Carolina, it became independent on October 10–11, 1922 following nearly two years of planning. The see city is Columbia. Its cathedral is Trinity Cathedral. The diocese has jurisdiction over congregations in the Upstate (northwestern) and Midlands regions of the U.S. state of South Carolina. The diocese is divided into four deaneries with an appointed dean (clergy) and lay warden: Upstate West, Upstate East, Midlands West, and Midlands East.

The bishop is the Right Rev. Daniel P. Richards. He was elected ninth bishop of the diocese on September 25, 2021 and was consecrated at Trinity Cathedral as bishop on February 26, 2022.

Among the Diocese's many institutions, the Bishop Gravatt Center began service in 1949 as a retreat and summer camp site. Now a non-profit corporation with its own Board of Trustees, the Center remains a vital part of the Diocese through its summer camp Christian formation program and numerous diocesan and parish activities such as Happening, Cursillo, youth retreats, vestry retreats, parish family weekends, etc.

== Bishops of Upper South Carolina ==
	Honorific & Name	Dates
1st	Kirkman George Finlay	1922–1938
2nd	John James Gravatt	1939–1953
3rd	Clarence Alfred Cole	1953–1963
4th	John Adams Pinckney	1963–1972
5th	George Moyer Alexander	1973–1979
6th	William Arthur Beckham	1979–1995
7th	Dorsey F. Henderson, Jr.	1995–2009
8th	W. Andrew Waldo	2010–2022
9th	Daniel P. Richards	2022–

== Parishes, Missions, and Institutions ==
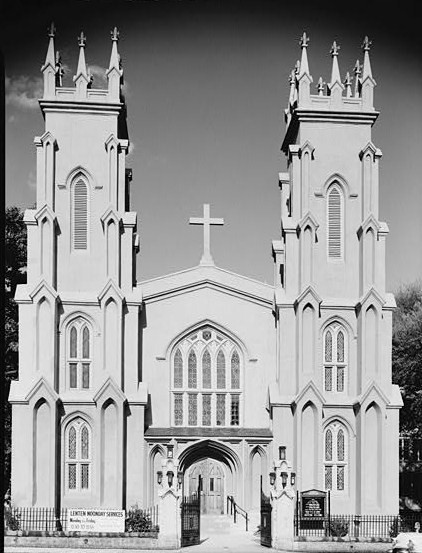
Trinity Cathedral, Columbia

=== Parishes and Missions ===
List of Parishes and Missions
City	Church	Website
Abbeville	Trinity Church	Link
Aiken	Saint Augustine of Canterbury Church	Link
Aiken	Saint Thaddeus Church	Link
Anderson	Grace Church	Link
Anderson	Saint George's Church	Link
Beech Island	All Saints' Church	Link
Batesburg	Saint Paul's Church	Link
Boiling Springs	Saint Margaret's Church	Link
Camden	Grace Church	Link
Cayce	All Saints' Church	Link
Chapin	Saint Francis of Assisi Church	Link
Chester	Saint Mark's Church	Link
Clemson	Holy Trinity Church	Link
Clinton	All Saints' Church	Link
Columbia	Church of the Good Shepherd	Link
Columbia	St. Luke's Church	Link
Columbia	St. David's Church	Link
Columbia	Trinity Cathedral Church	Link
Columbia	Church of the Cross	Link
Columbia	St. Timothy's Church	Link
Columbia	St. John's Church	Link
Columbia	St. Mary's Church	Link
Columbia	St. Martin's in the Fields Church	Link
Columbia	St. Michael & All Angels Church	Link
Easley	St. Michael's Church	Link
Eastover	St. Thomas	Link
Edgefield	Church of the Ridge	Link
Fort Mill	St. Paul's Episcopal Church	Link
Gaffney	Church of the Incarnation	Link
Graniteville	Saint Paul's Church	Link
Great Falls	Saint Peter's Church	Link
Greenville	Saint Francis' Church	Link
Greenville	Christ Church	Link
Greenville	Saint Philip's Church	Link
Greenville	Saint Peter's Church	Link
Greenville	Church of the Redeemer	Link
Greenville	Saint Andrew's Church	Link
Greenville	Saint James Church	Link
Greenwood	Church of the Resurrection	Link
Greer	Church of the Good Shepherd	Link
Hopkins	Saint John's Church	Link
Irmo	Church of Saint Simon and Saint Jude	Link
Jenkinsville	Saint Barnabas' Church	Link
Lancaster	Christ Church	Link
Laurens	Church of the Epiphany	Link
Lexington	Saint Alban's Church	Link
Newberry	Saint Luke's Church	Link
North Augusta	Saint Bartholomew's Church	Link
Ridgeway	Saint Stephen's Church	Link
Rock Hill	Church of Our Saviour	Link
Seneca	Church of the Ascension	Link
Simpsonville	Holy Cross Church	Link
Spartanburg	Saint Christopher's Church	Link
Spartanburg	Saint Matthew's Church	Link
Spartanburg	Church of the Advent	Link
Trenton	Church of the Ridge	Link
Union	Church of the Nativity	Link
Winnsboro	Saint John's Church	Link
York	Church of the Good Shepherd	Link

=== Institutions ===
List of Institutions
City	Institution	Website
Aiken	Bishop Gravatt Center / Camp Gravatt	—
Aiken	Mead Hall Episcopal School	—
Columbia	George M. Alexander Diocesan House	—
Columbia	Finlay House	—
Columbia	Heathwood Hall Episcopal School	—
Columbia	Saint Lawrence Place	—
Denmark	Voorhees College	—
Greenville	Christ Church Episcopal School	—
West Columbia	Chapel of the Holy Spirit (Still Hopes)	Link
West Columbia	South Carolina Episcopal Home at Still Hopes	—
York	York Place	—
