= Ruth Woodliff-Stanley =

American Episcopal bishop

The Right Reverend Ruth Woodliff-Stanley
- Bishop of South Carolina
- Church: Episcopal Church
- Province: IV
- Diocese: South Carolina
- Elected: May 1, 2021
- In office: 2021-present
- Predecessor: Gladstone B. Adams III (Provisional)
- Successor: Incumbent
- Previous posts: Canon, Dioceses of Northwestern Pennsylvania & Western New York; Canon to the Ordinary, Diocese of Colorado; Rector, St. Thomas Episcopal Church, Denver

Orders
- Ordination: June 28, 1991 by Duncan M. Gray Jr.
- Consecration: October 2, 2021 by Michael B. Curry

Personal details
- Born: August 9, 1962 (age 63) Jackson, Mississippi, United States
- Denomination: Episcopal Church
- Spouse: Nathan Woodliff-Stanley
- Children: 2

Ruth Woodliff-Stanley (born August 9, 1962) is a prelate of the Episcopal Church and currently serves as the 15th Bishop of South Carolina. She is the 1,137 Bishop consecrated for the church. Woodliff-Stanley is the first regular diocesan Bishop for the Diocese of South Carolina since 2012, and the first female Bishop in the over 200 plus years of the diocese's existence.

== Career ==
Woodliff-Stanley grew up in Mississippi. She was ordained deacon on June 13, 1990, and priest on June 28, 1991, in the Diocese of Mississippi. During her career with the church she served as a rector, a canon for two Bishops, and on the Episcopal Church Building Fund. Between 2007 and 2021 she was the rector of St Thomas' Church in Denver Colorado. She was elected at a special diocesan convention on May 1, 2021, and was consecrated and installed as Bishop on October 2, 2021, in Grace Church Cathedral. Presiding Bishop Michael B. Curry served as the chief consecrator.

=== Outcome of litigation ===
Woodliff-Stanley's first year as bishop was dominated by the denouement of the long-running legal battle between the Episcopal Diocese of South Carolina (EDOSC) and the Anglican Diocese of South Carolina (ADOSC) over properties valued at $500 million. In April 2022, the South Carolina Supreme Court issued a decision awarding 14 of the ADOSC's 29 contested parish properties to the EDOSC: Christ Church, Mount Pleasant; Good Shepherd, Charleston; Holy Comforter, Sumter; Holy Cross, Stateburg; Holy Trinity, Charleston; St. Bartholomew's, Hartsville; St. David's, Cheraw; St. Luke's, Hilton Head; St. Matthew's, Fort Motte; St. James, Charleston; St. John's, Johns Island; St. Jude's, Walterboro; Trinity, Myrtle Beach; and Old St. Andrew's, Charleston. Clarifying a lower court ruling that in turn interpreted an earlier Supreme Court decision in the matter, the Supreme Court determined that the 14 parishes did indeed create an “irrevocable trust in favor of the National Church and its diocese” by in some form adopting the Episcopal Church's 1979 Dennis Canon.

Several of the parishes requested a rehearing, arguing that, based on the court's criteria, they had not placed their property in trust (or had revoked the trust pursuant to South Carolina law) for the benefit of the Episcopal Church and its associated diocese. In August 2022, the court granted the petitions of six of the parishes, leaving eight parish properties set to be returned to EDOSC: St. John's Episcopal Church on Johns Island, Christ Church in Mount Pleasant, St. David's Episcopal Church in Cheraw, Holy Trinity Episcopal Church in Charleston; St. Bartholomew's Episcopal Church in Hartsville; St. James Episcopal Church in James Island, St. Matthew's Episcopal Church in Fort Motte, and Good Shepherd Episcopal Church in Charleston. (In October 2022, without a critical mass of Episcopalians to restart a congregation, Woodliff-Stanley agreed to sell St. Matthew's Episcopal Church to the ADOSC congregation.)

Woodliff-Stanley and ADOSC Bishop Chip Edgar, who had been consecrated in 2022, began mediation to discuss a resolution to the disputes between the dioceses in spring 2022. On September 26, 2022, Edgar and Woodliff-Stanley jointly announced a settlement between the dioceses. While the settlement did not affect remaining issues regarding the property rights of three parishes still pending before the state Supreme Court or a betterments lawsuit by several parishes pending in state trial court, "it does resolve all remaining issues regarding diocesan properties." As part of the settlement, St. Christopher Camp and Conference Center on Seabrook Island was transferred from the ADOSC to the EDOSC on October 1, 2022. Under the settlement, the ADOSC also transferred the bishop's residence in Charleston, additional diocesan-owned real property in Charleston and Santee. The EDOSC waived claims to the ADOSC's leasehold interest in the diocesan headquarters. Historical papers in ADOSC possession will be made available for copying by both dioceses and then donated to the South Carolina Historical Society or another mutually agreed nonprofit; similarly, historical silver in ADOSC without a claim by a parish will be donated to the Charleston Museum or another mutually agreed nonprofit. Bishops' portraits in the possession of ADOSC will be copied and then transferred to EDOSC.

Both the ADOSC and the EDOSC agreed to provide quitclaim deeds to ADOSC church plants whose properties were not subject to orders in the litigation. They also agreed to dismiss pending litigation in federal court over diocesan names and seals, leaving the EDOSC as the owner of the historical name and seal. “From the very beginning of this process, I have been grateful for the gracious spirit of Bishop Edgar in doing just this work with us," Woodliff-Stanley commented. "While each diocese has had to leave things on the table to get to this moment, and while we experience pain over losses of some of the historic churches our members hold dear, even still, we have seen the Spirit at work in drawing us toward God’s redemptive way of love at every juncture.”

Content adapted from Chip Edgar; see that page's history for attribution

== Education ==
Woodliff-Stanley studied at Swarthmore College and graduated with a Bachelor of Arts in religious studies and psychology, in 1985. She then enrolled for a Master of Social Work at Columbia University, graduating in 1991. She also completed a Master of Divinity at Yale Divinity School in 1991.

== Personal life ==
Woodliff-Stanley was born in 1962 in Jackson, Mississippi, and is a graduate of Swarthmore College and Yale University. She is married to the Rev. Nathan Woodliff-Stanley, an ordained Unitarian Universalist minister, and former executive director of the ACLU of Colorado (2012–2020), who also served on the board of Interfaith Alliance of Colorado, and is a director of the Stanley Center for Peace and Security, a private foundation based in Iowa. They have two sons.

== See also ==
- List of Episcopal bishops of the United States
- Historical list of the Episcopal bishops of the United States
