= St. Michael's Anglican Church (Charleston, South Carolina) =

Historic church in United States

- St. Michael's Anglican Church (formerly St. Michael's Episcopal Church)
- U.S. National Register of Historic Places
- U.S. National Historic Landmark
- U.S. National Historic Landmark District – Contributing property
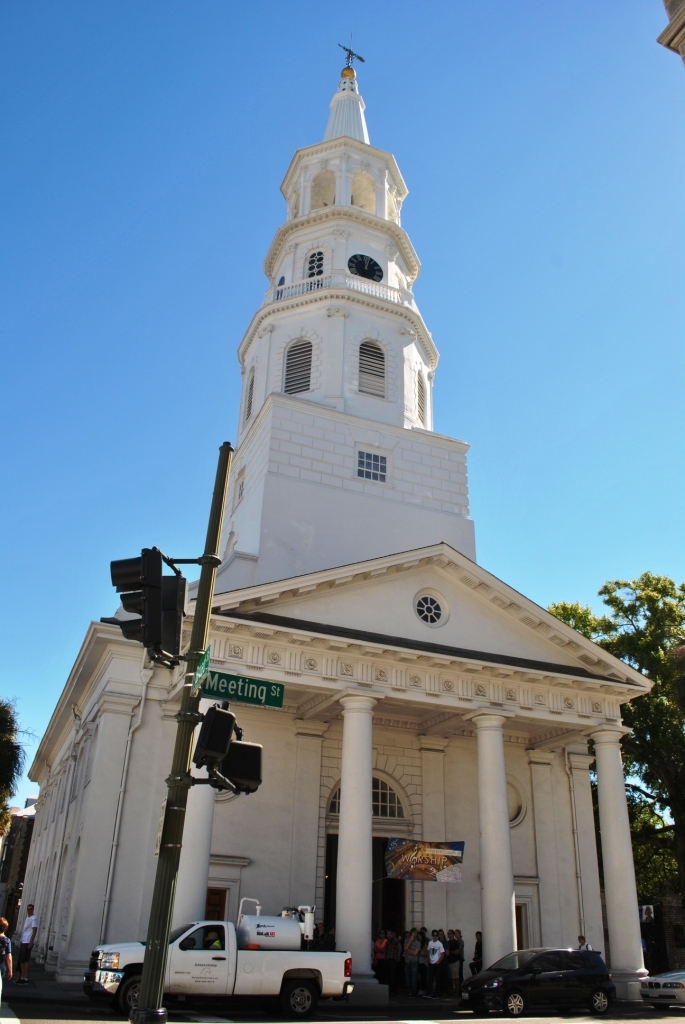
- St. Michael's Anglican Church (formerly St. Michael's Episcopal Church)

- Location within South Carolina Location within the United States
- Location: 71 Broad St., Charleston, South Carolina
- Coordinates: 32°46′34.759″N 79°55′50.738″W
- Built: 1751–1761
- Built by: Samuel Cardy
- Architectural style: Georgian
- Part of: Charleston Historic District (ID66000964)
- NRHP reference No.: 66000704

Significant dates
- Added to NRHP: October 15, 1966
- Designated NHL: October 9, 1960
- Designated NHLDCP: October 9, 1960

St. Michael's Anglican Church (formerly St. Michael's Episcopal Church) is a historic church and the oldest surviving religious structure in Charleston, South Carolina. It is located at Broad and Meeting streets on one of the Four Corners of Law, and represents ecclesiastical law. It was built in the 1750s by order of the South Carolina Assembly. It is listed on the National Register of Historic Places and is a National Historic Landmark.

== History ==
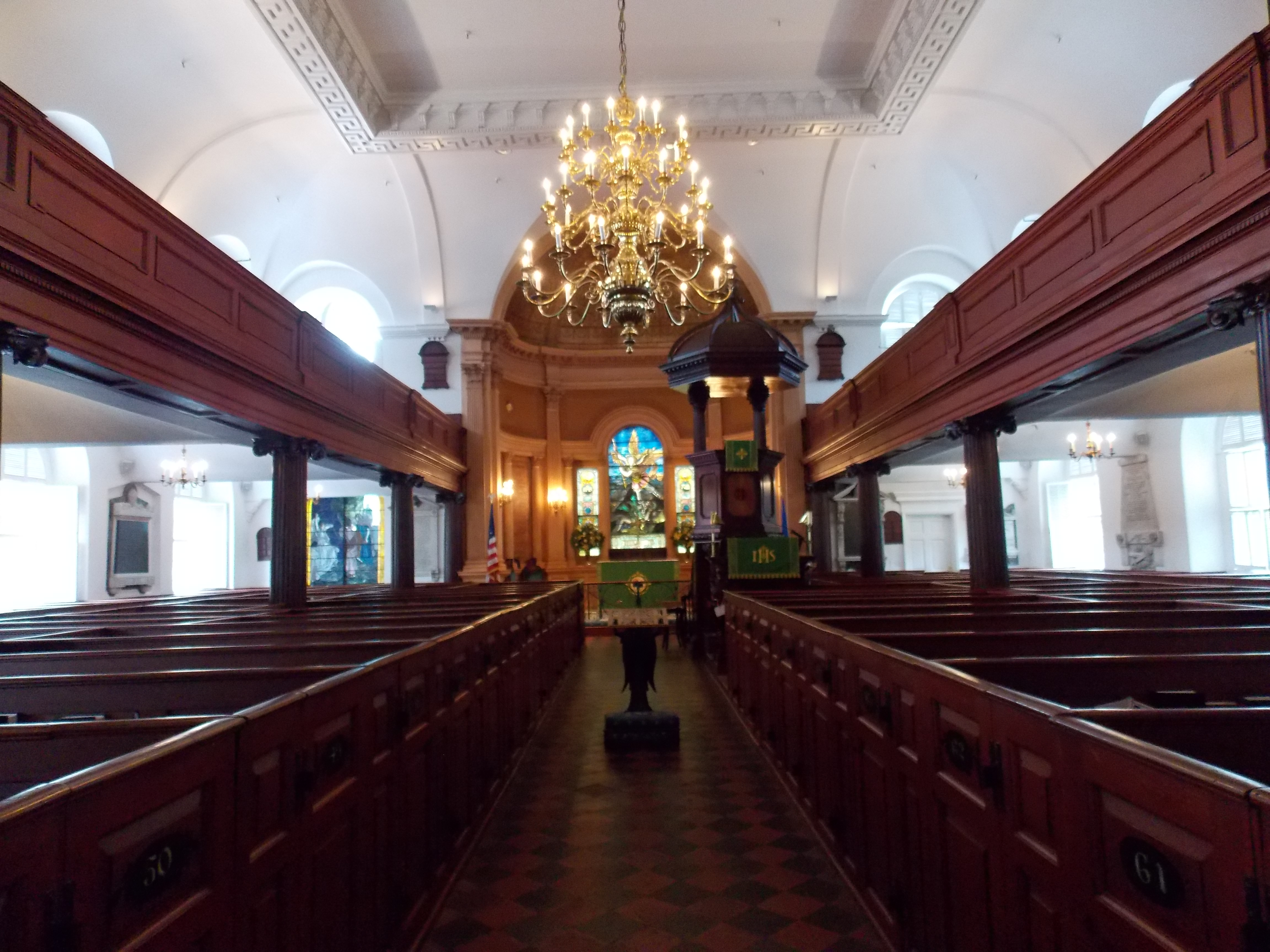
Church interior

St. Michael's Church was built between 1751 and 1761 at the corner of Broad and Meeting streets on the site of the original wooden church built in 1681 by St. Philip's Church, It had been damaged in a hurricane in 1710 and a new St. Philip's Church was built several blocks away on Church Street. In 1727, what was left of the old wooden church was demolished. During his 1791 visit to the city, President George Washington worshipped in pew no. 43 of the church. Robert E. Lee also worshipped here.

It is not known who designed St. Michael's, but it shows the influence of St Martin-in-the-Fields, London, designed in the 1720s by James Gibbs. Samuel Cardy was the builder. The walls are of brick that was stuccoed over and painted white. The two-story portico facing Broad Street was the first of its size in colonial America and features Tuscan columns.

Between 1754 and 1760, £1000 worth of architectural carving was done by Charleston artisan Henry Burnett, including ovolo moldings, seventy-two modillions for a Corinthian entablature for the facade, fifty-four double flowers for the portico, and a large “foliage flower” in the center of the ceiling.

An organ by John Snetzler was fitted in 1768 but only the case remains; new organ 1994 by Kenneth Jones of Bray, Ireland.

In the north wall is a stained glass window that was given to the church in 1898 as a memorial to Mrs. E.A. Simons. The design of the window is a copy of "Easter Morning" using between 1800 and 2000 pieces in the six by ten foot window. It was created by Louis Lederlie for Tiffany Studios. Louis Tiffany spent two months on the decorative panels and dome of the chancel in 1905.

Another stained glass window is located in the chancel and depicts St. Michael conquering Satan; it is based on a work in the Louvre by Raphael. The window was made in New York and installed in 1893. The location had originally been a window, but the opening was enclosed in 1788 to prevent the spread of fires from adjacent buildings. In 1865, the wall was damaged by shelling during the Civil War, and the location of the window became apparent.

It was declared a National Historic Landmark in 1961, and it was included in the first promulgation of the National Register in 1966.

St. Michael's Churchyard, adjacent to the church, is the resting place of some famous historical figures, including two signers of the U.S. Constitution.

== Religious affiliation ==
St. Michael's was originally affiliated with the Church of England. Following the American Revolution the church came under the jurisdiction of what is now the Episcopal Church of the United States. Currently it is a parish church of the Anglican Diocese of South Carolina. In 2012 long simmering disagreements over doctrine and church discipline caused the Episcopal Diocese of SC to disaffiliate from the Episcopal Church, over time becoming known as the Anglican Diocese of South Carolina. In June 2017 the diocese, and by extension St. Michael's, were received into the Anglican Church in North America. The parish continues to worship according to Anglican rites and traditions.

== Clock and bells ==
The church houses a clock and change ringing bells dating from colonial times. The tower clock, which strikes the hours and quarters, was made by Aynsworth Thwaites Thwaites & Reed.

The tower bells are one of four sets (Grace Church Cathedral – Episcopal, The Cathedral Church of Saint Luke and Saint Paul, and Stella Maris Catholic church) in the Charleston area. The bells were cast in 1764 by Lester and Pack of London and recast in 1866 (in London again). One bell was returned to London in 1870 to be recast at the expense of Charleston.

== Gallery ==
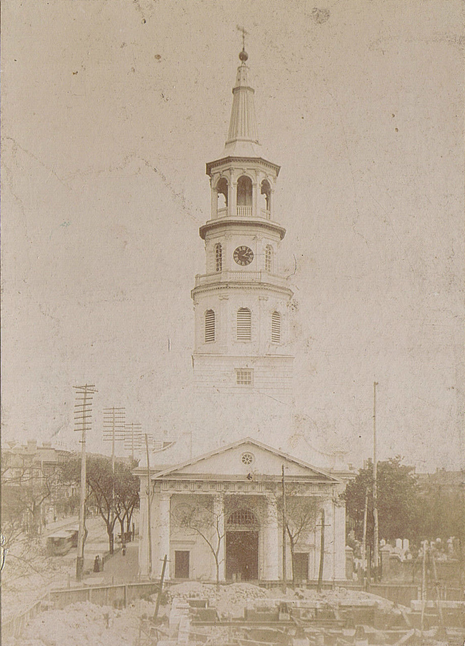
The perspective in this full front view taken between 1886 and 1896 is no longer possible because of the construction of the post office across Meeting Street from the church.

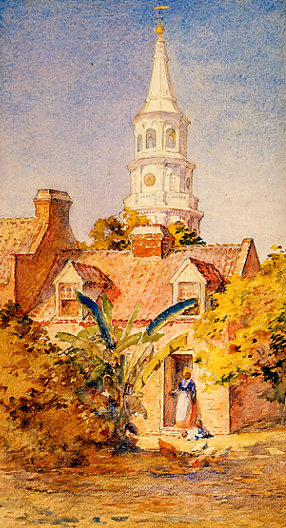
The Rector's Kitchen and View of St. Michael's, Alice Ravenel Huger Smith, c. 1910–1915

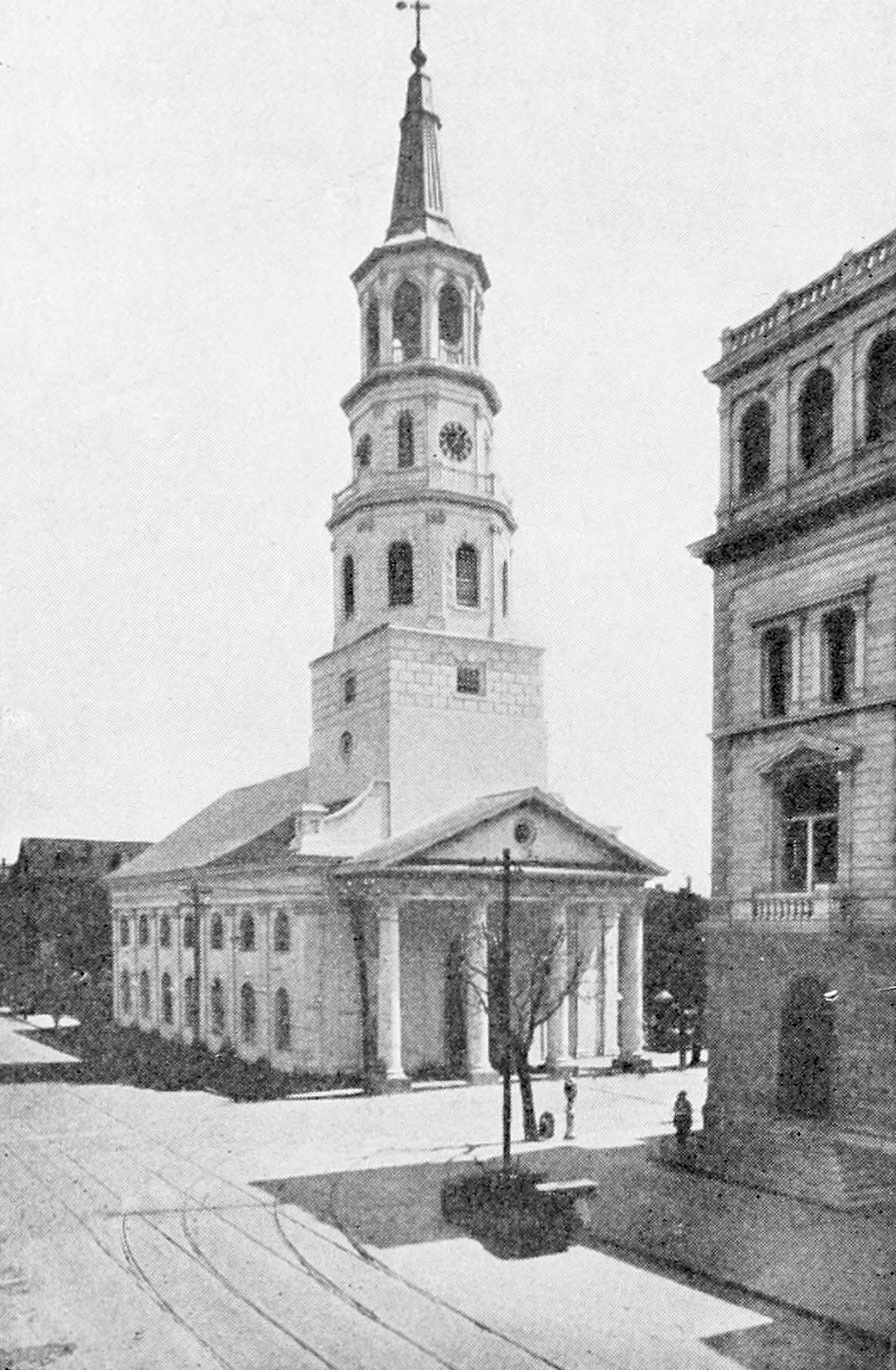
1919

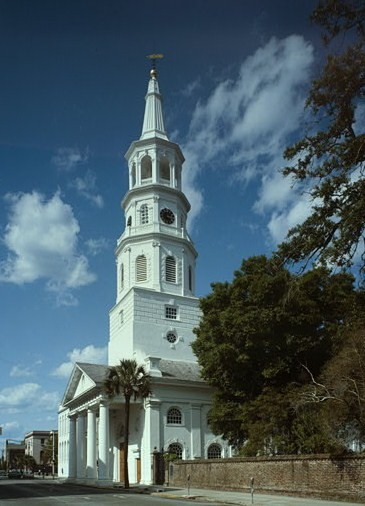
St. Michael's Church

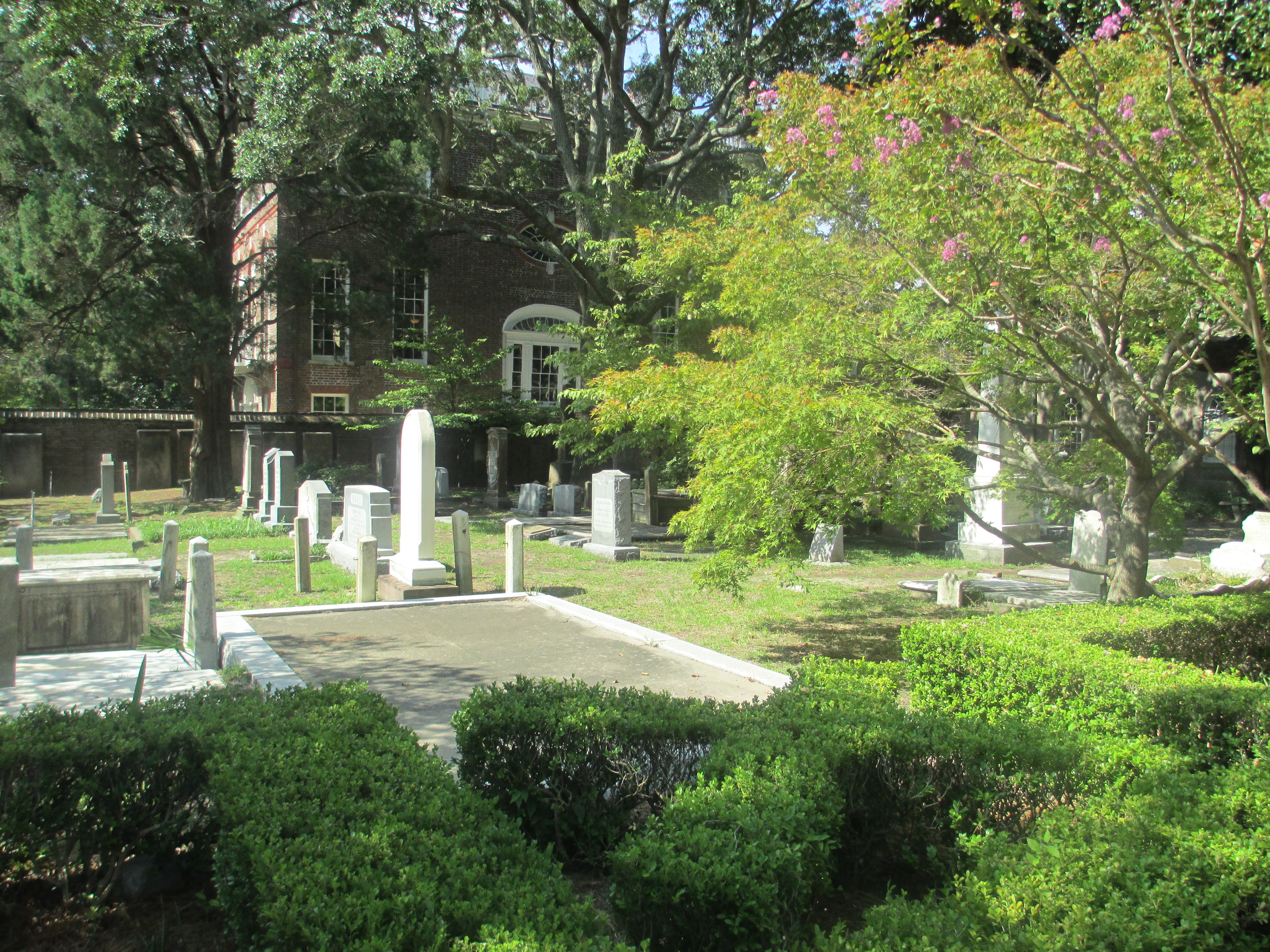
Graveyard; among those interred is jurist John Rutledge.

== See also ==
- National Register of Historic Places listings in Charleston, South Carolina
- List of National Historic Landmarks in South Carolina
- St. Michael's Churchyard, Charleston
