= Grace Church Cathedral =

Historic church in South Carolina, United States

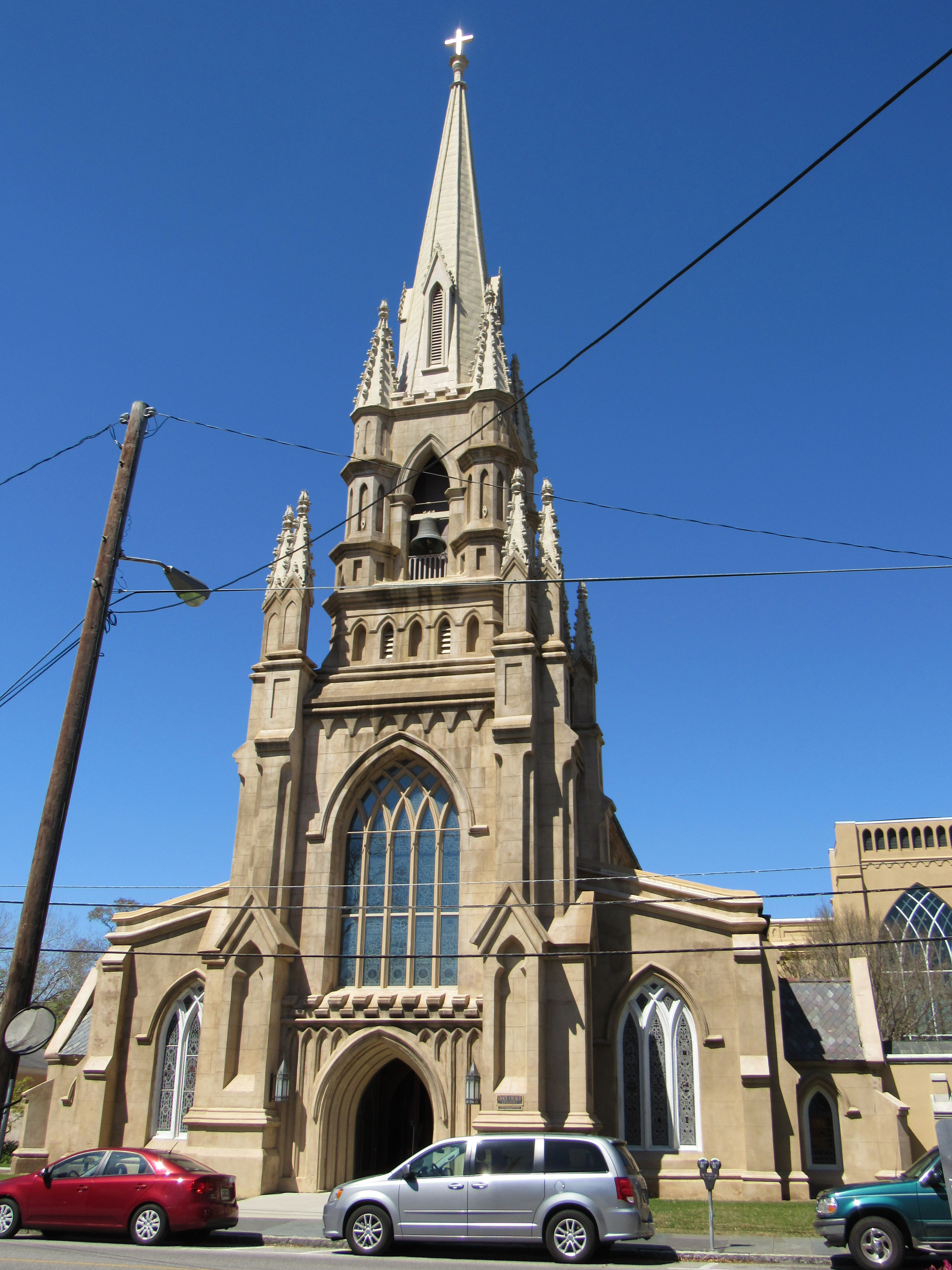
- Grace Church Cathedral

- Location within South Carolina
- 32°46′54″N 79°56′12″W
- Location: 98 Wentworth St. Charleston, South Carolina
- Country: United States
- Denomination: Episcopal Church in the United States of America
- Churchmanship: Broad Church
- Website: www.gracechurchcharleston.org

History
- Founded: 1846

Architecture
- Architect: Edward Brickell White
- Style: Gothic Revival
- Completed: 1848

Specifications
- Materials: Stucco over brick

Administration
- Diocese: South Carolina

Clergy
- Bishop: Rt. Rev. Ruth Woodliff-Stanley
- Dean: Very Rev. J. Michael A. Wright
- Grace Episcopal Church
- U.S. Historic district – Contributing property
- Part of: Charleston Historic District (ID70000923)
- Added to NRHP: January 30, 1970

Grace Church Cathedral, located in Charleston, South Carolina, is the diocesan cathedral of the Episcopal Church in South Carolina. It is also a contributing property in the Charleston Historic District. The parish was founded as the city's fifth Episcopal Church congregation in 1846. The Gothic Revival church was designed by E.B. White and completed in 1848. The church remained open during the American Civil War until it was hit by a shell in January 1864. It reopened the following year. The church was also severely damaged in an earthquake in August 1886, in a hurricane in 1911, and in Hurricane Hugo in 1989.

It was selected to be the cathedral at the annual diocesan convention in November 2015; the previous diocesan cathedral, the Cathedral of St. Luke and St. Paul, became affiliated with the Anglican Diocese of South Carolina in 2012. Robert Willis, Dean of Canterbury, presented the newly designated cathedral with a Canterbury cross at a special service in April 2016. Episcopal Church Presiding Bishop Michael Curry was also present.

== See also ==
- List of the Episcopal cathedrals of the United States
- List of cathedrals in the United States
