= Trinity Episcopal Cathedral (Columbia, South Carolina) =

Cathedral in Columbia, South Carolina

Trinity Episcopal Church
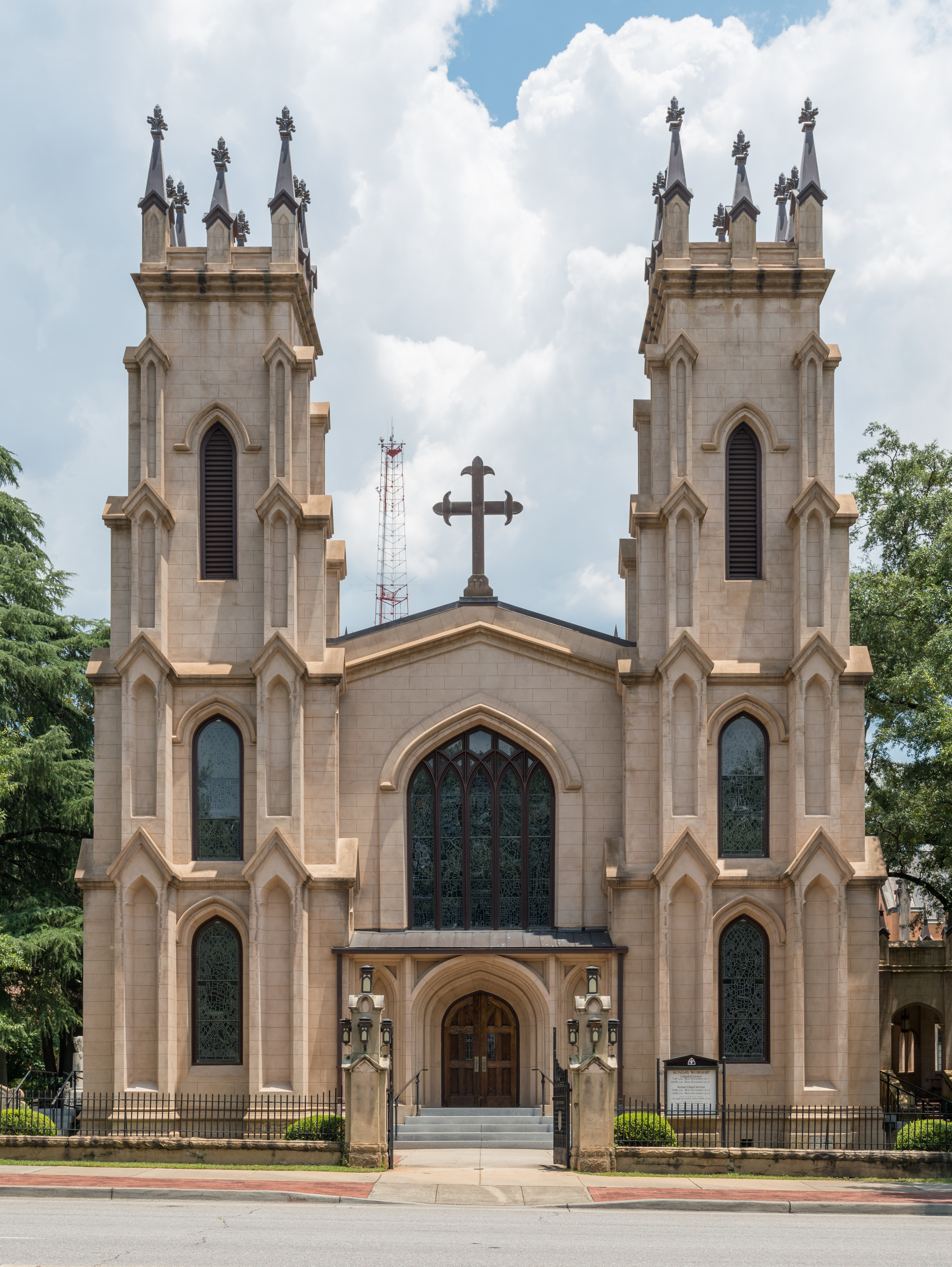
- Trinity Episcopal Church

Religion
- Affiliation: Episcopal Church
- District: Episcopal Diocese of Upper South Carolina
- Leadership: The Very Rev. Cameron Nations (Dean) The Rev. Jimmy Hartley (Sub-Dean and Canon Pastor) The Rev. Mia C. McDowell (Canon Catechist)
- Year consecrated: 1847
- Status: Active

Location
- Location: 1100 Sumter St., Columbia, South Carolina
- State: South Carolina
- Interactive map of Trinity Episcopal Church
- Coordinates: 34°0′3.7″N 81°1′52″W

Architecture
- Architect: Edward Brickell White
- Type: Church
- Style: Gothic Revival
- Groundbreaking: 1845
- Completed: 1894

Specifications
- Direction of façade: West
- Materials: Stucco over brick

U.S. National Register of Historic Places
- Added to NRHP: February 24, 1971
- NRHP Reference no.: 71000805

Website
- http://www.trinitysc.org/

Trinity Episcopal Cathedral, originally known as Trinity Episcopal Church, is the first Episcopal Parish and the oldest surviving sanctuary in Columbia, South Carolina, United States. It is a Gothic Revival church that is modeled after York Minster in York, England. It was named to the National Register of Historic Places on February 24, 1971.

Trinity Cathedral is on the east side of Sumter Street between Gervais and Senate streets. It is directly east of the South Carolina State House.

In 2025, the cathedral reported 4,142 members. Plate and pledge financial support reported by the cathedral in 2025 was $3,077,255. Average Sunday Attendance (ASA) reported by the cathedral in 2025 was 535 persons. This was a relative decrease from ASA of 1,004 persons reported in 2015.

== Early history ==
In 1812, the Society for the Advancement of Christianity in South Carolina, which was formed in 1810 by the Episcopal Diocese of South Carolina, sent Rev. Fowler to Columbia to establish a mission. The parish was organized on August 8, 1812. Bishop Theodore Dehon visited on May 13, 1813 and held services at the State House. It was incorporated by the South Carolina Legislature as the "Episcopal Church in Columbia."

The Legislature gave four lots on Lady Street to the Presbyterian and Episcopal congregations with the condition that they pay half their value to the Baptist and Methodist congregations to assist in construction of their churches. The Episcopalians sold their lots to the Presbyterians for the construction of the existing First Presbyterian Church.

The cornerstone for the first church was laid on March 7, 1814. Bishop Dehon consecrated Trinity Church on December 14, 1814. The wooden church on the southeastern corner of Sumter and Gervais Streets had a cruciform shape. General Hampton donated $2,000 (equivalent to $30,714 in 2025) and the organ to the church.

After a period of four years without a rector, Peter J. Shand was sent by the Diocese as a lay reader. On January 19, 1834, he was ordained a deacon and was invited by the vestry to run the church. He accepted and stayed for the next fifty-two years. The parish grew. In 1838, it began an African American Sunday School in 1838, installed a new organ in 1839, and began a school for indigent students in 1844.

== Architecture ==
The Gothic Revival church was designed by Edward Brickell White and calls to mind the medieval York Minster. The cornerstone was laid on November 26, 1845, by the rector, Peter Shand. Although the church had a cruciform design, only the nave and the twin towers were constructed. Each tower had eight pinnacles topped with a fleur de lis. The brick structure was plastered with buff stucco. The towers and walls have shouldered buttresses. The nave has a clerestory, which is the only one in a Columbia church. The roof is supported on exposed wooden beams. Bishop Gadsden consecrated the church on February 14, 1857.

The baptismal font donated by John S. Preston was sculpted by Hiram Powers. This was later donated to the Church of the Nativity in Union, South Carolina and replaced by another Preston family donation sculpted by Hiram Powers.

The stained-glass windows from Munich were added around 1860. In 1861 and 1862, which were the early years of the Confederacy, the transepts and an apsidal chancel were constructed under the direction of Edward Brickell White. In 1890, a memorial stained-glass window in honor of Dr. Peter Shand was installed in the chancel. Later in the decade, additions included a Jardine chancel organ, choir stalls, a choir room, the eagle lectern, and the pulpit.

== Later history ==
Local tradition holds that laymen took down the church's Episcopal signs and put paper-mâché crosses on the roof when the Union Army entered Columbia on February 17, 1865. They felt that this might protect the church because General Sherman was Catholic. When Sherman's army set fire to Columbia, the rectory burned in the fire, but the church survived. A photograph taken around 1862 shows a large cross at the peak of the gable on the front of the church.

In June 1865, the commander of the Columbia garrison of the Union Army ordered Rev. Shand to say the prayer for the president in the Book of Common Prayer, letting him know that a member of his staff would attend the service. When Shand began the prayer, the parish members rose from their knees and did not say "Amen."

In 1922, the Diocese of South Carolina was divided. Trinity Church became part of the new Episcopal Diocese of Upper South Carolina. Trinity Church was named the cathedral of the diocese on January 19, 1977.

== Churchyard ==
At various times in the history of the parish, three live oak trees were planted in the churchyard. The Sire Oak was planted in 1814 after the first church was built. The second was planted in 1900 after finishing the church. The third tree was planted in 1925 when the Parish House was finished. There is a wrought iron fence around the churchyard.

The churchyard is the burial site for many noted South Carolinians: American Revolutionary War generals Wade Hampton I and Peter Horry and Private Robert Stark; Wade Hampton II, who was a veteran of the War of 1812 and noted plantation owner; John Gabriel Guignard, who was surveyor of Columbia; Dr. Thomas Cooper, who was president of South Carolina College; Confederate generals States Rights Gist, Wade Hampton III, and John S. Preston; the poet Henry Timrod; Senator Preston; six South Carolina governors: Richard Irvine Manning I, John Lawrence Manning, Hugh Smith Thompson, Richard Irvine Manning III, and James F. Byrnes; U.S. Attorney Terrell L. Glenn Sr.; and eight bishops, including Ellison Capers.

== See also ==
- List of the Episcopal cathedrals of the United States
- List of cathedrals in the United States
- List of burial places of justices of the Supreme Court of the United States
