= Wiley Roy Mason =

Suffragan bishop of the Diocese of Virginia

The Right Reverend Roy Mason D.D.
- Suffragan Bishop of Virginia
- Church: Episcopal Church
- Diocese: Virginia
- Elected: May 1942
- In office: 1942–1951
- Other post: Assistant Bishop of Virginia (1951-1967)

Orders
- Ordination: May 24, 1908 by Robert Atkinson Gibson
- Consecration: September 22, 1942 by Henry St. George Tucker

Personal details
- Born: November 9, 1878 King George, Virginia, United States
- Died: December 25, 1967 (aged 89) Charlottesville, Virginia, United States
- Buried: St John's Church, King George, Virginia
- Denomination: Anglican
- Parents: Julian J. Mason and Elizabeth Freeland
- Spouse: Mary Ruffin Jones
- Children: 2
- Education: College of William & Mary; Virginia Theological Seminary

[Wiley] Roy ("Roy" or "W.R.") Mason (November 9, 1878 - December 25, 1967) was a bishop of The Episcopal Church, known for his ministry among isolated mountain communities and serving in the Diocese of Virginia as suffragan from 1942 to 1951.

== Early life and education ==
Mason was born on November 9, 1878, in King George, Virginia, the son of Julian J. Mason and Elizabeth Freeland. He studied at the College of William & Mary from where he graduated in 1904. He then began theological studies in Alexandria, Virginia, graduating from the Virginia Theological Seminary in 1907.

== Ordained ministry ==
Mason was ordained deacon in 1907 and priest on May 24, 1908, by Bishop Robert Atkinson Gibson, the latter in the VTS's Immanuel Chapel. His first position was at Mission Home in Greene County, which permitted Rev. George Mayo to establish the Blue Ridge Industrial School, a boarding school to provide higher education to children and adults in the Blue Ridge Mountains after Rev. Frederick Neve established churches and 13 day schools in isolated communities by 1909. Mason continued in that position for about a decade, including after Neve's missions formally became the Archdeaconry of Blue Ridge. After 1911 Mason began campaigning to limit moonshine stills in those rural areas because of their detrimental effect on mountain families. He achieved some success by 1914 in Greene and nearby Albemarle Counties, by switching tactics after surviving assassination attempts (which he attributed to God's grace) and opening a vinegar factory which paid farmers the same price for apples as did still owners. In addition to illiteracy hurting isolated mountain families, the American chestnut blight was devastating trees which had one provided important income for locals, as well as timber for homes and forage for their hogs.

In 1918 Rev. Mason accepted a position as rector of Christ Church in Charlottesville, Virginia, while also continuing to serve mountain missions in surrounding Albemarle and other counties. In 1926 Mason became Associate Archdeacon of the Blue Ridge (the presumed heir-apparent to the active but 70-year-old Neve). In 1928, funding permitted them to develop an additional building at Mission Home, a preventorium to nurse mountain children back to health (particularly from tuberculosis, a dreaded disease in the community).

By 1930, Virginia and federal officials were planning to construct Skyline Drive and Shenandoah National Park, which would bisect the missions (and take over those at Simmons' Gap and Upper Pocosin), as well as cause hardship for over 600 displaced mountain people, despite promises for relocation and some compensation. By 1936, all the mission schools except for the Blue Ridge Industrial School were closed (although many were now operated by the surrounding counties), but the promised new houses for 50 families went unfulfilled. Nonetheless the educational effort succeeded, as E.I. DuPont de Nemours and Crompton Shenandoah moved into Waynesboro, and other textile and manufacturing plants moved into the Piedmont region. Now-literate mountain people could compete for those jobs in addition to the still-developing tourist industry.

== Bishop ==
Mason was elected Suffragan Bishop of Virginia in May 1942, during the 147th diocesan council meeting which took place between the 26 and 28 of May. After now 88year old Archdeacon for Life Neve spoke in Mason's favor, the other eight candidates withdrew their names from consideration on the 5th lay ballot. Bishop Mason was consecrated on September 22, 1942, by Presiding Bishop Henry St. George Tucker, Bishop Frederick D. Goodwin and others, in Christ Church, Charlottesville, Virginia. He retained the post till his retirement in 1951, however, he remained Assistant Bishop of Virginia till his death. The mountain missions were reorganized in 1952 and placed under the administration of Rev. Albert N. Jones.

== Death and legacy ==
Mason died after a prolonged illness on Christmas Day, 1967.
