= Epiphany Episcopal Church (Oak Hill, Virginia) =

- Church of the Epiphany Episcopal
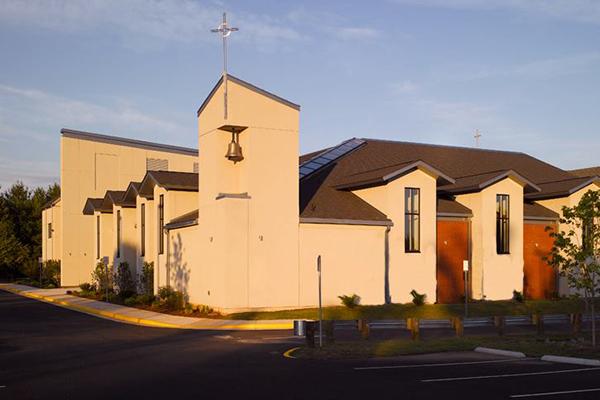
- Epiphany Episcopal Church
- Epiphany Episcopal Church
- 38.906°N 77.408°W
- Location: 3301 Hidden Meadow Drive, Oak Hill, Virginia
- Country: United States
- Denomination: Episcopal
- Website: epiphanyec.org (redirection supported from COEE.org)

History
- Dedicated: February 1989

Architecture
- Groundbreaking: 27 March 1988

Administration
- Diocese: The Episcopal Diocese of Virginia

The Church of the Epiphany Episcopal is an Episcopal church within the Episcopal Diocese of Virginia in Oak Hill, Virginia, United States. The church was established in 1985 as a 'mission church' by members of Truro Episcopal Church (Fairfax, Virginia) and is listed in a book compiled in 1989 by Don Massey for the Episcopal Diocese of Virginia. The church is legally registered as Church of the Epiphany Episcopal while doing business as (DBA) Epiphany Episcopal Church, and is informally known as "The Church on the Corner."

Epiphany Episcopal Church (AKA Epiphany) is one of 180 churches currently included in the Episcopal Diocese of Virginia within the Episcopal Church of the United States, comprising some 69,000 Diocese members as of 2018. Epiphany Episcopal Church reclaimed tenancy of the buildings located on Hidden Meadow Drive in May 2012; the facilities remain part of The Episcopal Church's Diocese of Virginia. The first on-site priest in charge following the 2012 return was the Rev. Jennifer Gaines McKenzie, who served from May 2012 to August 2013. In January 2014, Epiphany Episcopal Church accepted Rev. Hillary West as priest in charge. Rev. West was named as rector following the parish annual meeting held on February 16, 2016 and was officially installed on August 11, 2016. Rev. West retired on May 31, 2020. After a process known as discernment, Epiphany Episcopal Church and the Diocese of Virginia selected Reverend Dina Widlake as the new Rector, starting in February 2022.

== History ==
The Church of the Epiphany Episcopal was established in 1985 when 15 congregation members from Truro Episcopal Church sought to establish a mission church in Western Fairfax County. The site is on Manahoac and Piscataway ancestral lands. Initial church services were held in Franklin Intermediate School. According to Epiphany Episcopal Church's history page, "Reverend B. Clifton Reardon, affectionately known as 'Father Bill,' was appointed vicar. After the first year, the Episcopal mission Church of the Epiphany was granted parish status and ground breaking for the church building took place on March 27, 1988; the first service was held in the building in February 1989." Based on growing needs in the early 2000s, the Church of the Epiphany Episcopal congregation held a successful capital campaign titled 'Building on Christ's Cornerstone.' They mortgaged construction of a new Sanctuary and Nave (worship hall), a small chapel, classrooms and a Gathering Space in 2006, greatly increasing the building footprint to nearly 40,000 square feet.

Starting after the 2003 General Convention of the Episcopal Church, discussions arose concerning appointment of "a gay priest recently elected a bishop and about whether same-gender relationships should be blessed." Members of several Episcopal congregations in Virginia subsequently began to take issue with some of the decisions made at the 2003 General Convention. In 2006, many members of the Church of the Epiphany Episcopal congregation voted to break from the Episcopal Church over above-noted theological and governance issues, and this portion of the congregation stayed at the facilities on Hidden Meadow Drive.

In 2007, the remaining members of the Church of the Epiphany Episcopal met with other "Continuing Churches," including The Falls Church, St. Margaret's Episcopal Church (Woodbridge, VA), and St. Stephen's Episcopal Church (Heathsville, VA) to plan future actions. On July 8, 2007, the founding members held a meeting of 18 congregationalists and reconstituted the Church of the Epiphany Episcopal. From 2007 to 2012, Epiphany Episcopal Church members first met at congregation member homes and then met in rented space in the nearby Oak Hill Elementary School cafeteria.

During this time, legal discussions took place in Virginia's Fairfax Circuit Court regarding disputed Episcopal church facilities in the state, including Epiphany Episcopal Church.

- In 2008 the Fairfax Circuit Court initially ruled in favor of the Anglican congregations claiming church property rights. "19 Dec 2008--The judge presiding in the church property trial between the Episcopal Church and eleven former congregations, now affiliated with the Anglican District of Virginia (ADV), ruled in the congregations' favor today."
- On June 10, 2010, Justice Lawrence L. Koontz, Jr. filed an appeal with Fairfax Circuit Court regarding technical aspects of the Virginia case. "The principal issue we must decide is whether under the specific facts of these cases Code § 57-9(A) authorized the congregations to file petitions in the appropriate circuit courts for entry of orders permitting them to continue to occupy and control real property held in trust for the congregations after voting to disaffiliate from the church and affiliate with another polity."
- The legal challenge filed by The Episcopal Church on behalf of the Virginia Episcopalian congregations was resolved on January 10, 2012 following 22 days of testimony over the period of April to June 2011 with over 60 witnesses and more than a thousand pages of documents.

The return of Epiphany and other Episcopal properties in Virginia was reported in news media including sources such the Associated Press and The Washington Post. The Rt. Rev. Shannon Johnston, Bishop of the Episcopal Diocese of Virginia, acknowledged the challenges of the transition, offering the hope of working together "...to serve the mission and ministry of the Episcopal Church..." In 2014, conversations between Bishop Shannon Johnston and Rev. Tory Baucum of Truro Church led to a friendship on opposite divides of a theological debate and property dispute, giving hope to "... begin repairing long estrangements."
