= John B. Newton =

American bishop coadjutor

The Right Reverend John Brockenbrough Newton
- Coadjutor Bishop of Virginia
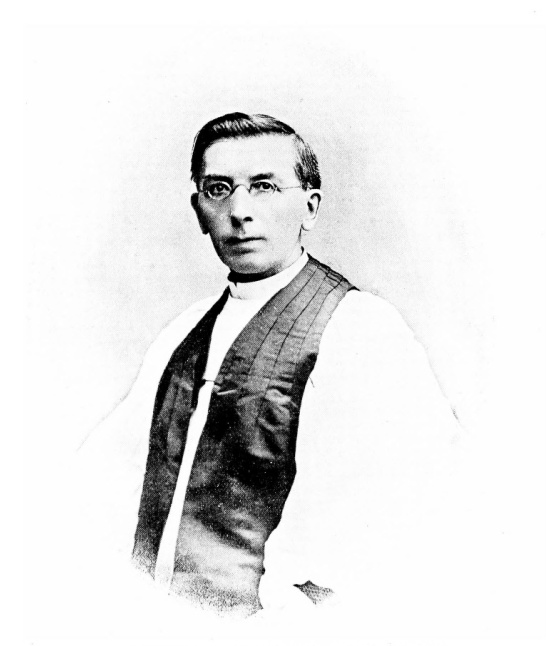
- Church: Episcopal Church
- Diocese: Virginia
- Elected: January 31, 1894
- In office: 1894–1897
- Predecessor: Alfred Magill Randolph
- Successor: Robert Atkinson Gibson

Orders
- Ordination: June 29, 1872 by Francis McNeece Whittle
- Consecration: May 16, 1894 by Francis McNeece Whittle

Personal details
- Born: February 7, 1839 Westmoreland County, Virginia, United States
- Died: May 28, 1897 (aged 58) Richmond, Virginia, United States
- Buried: Hollywood Cemetery (Richmond, Virginia)
- Denomination: Anglican
- Parents: Willoughby Newton & Mary S. Brockenbrough
- Spouse: Roberta Page Williamson
- Children: 8

John Brockenbrough Newton (February 7, 1839 – May 28, 1897) was bishop coadjutor of Virginia, but he died in that post, without succeeding to the diocesan See.

== Biography ==
Newton was born in Westmoreland County, Virginia on February 7, 1839, the son of Willoughby Newton and Mary S. Brockenbrough. He was educated at the Episcopal High School in Alexandria, Virginia, the Edge Hill School, and Schouler's School, near Fredericksburg. He attended a Medical School in Winchester, Virginia and afterwards graduated from the Medical College of Virginia with a Doctor of Medicine in 1860. At the beginning of the American Civil War, he entered the Confederate army as a private in the 40th Virginia Infantry, where he served as assistant surgeon and later as full surgeon.

After the war, he continued to practice medicine until 1870, when he commenced studies for the ordained ministry. He was ordained deacon on June 25, 1871, and priest on June 29, 1872, by Bishop Francis McNeece Whittle. He served as rector of St John's Church and St Paul's Church in Tappahannock, Virginia between 1871 and 1876. Later, in 1876, he became rector of Christ and St. Luke's Church in Norfolk, Virginia, while in 1884 he became rector of Monumental Church in Richmond, Virginia.

He was elected Coadjutor Bishop of Virginia on January 31, 1894, and was consecrated in Monumental Church on May 16, 1894, by Francis McNeece Whittle, Bishop of Virginia; Thomas Underwood Dudley, Bishop of Kentucky; and George William Peterkin, Bishop of West Virginia at the Diocese's 99th Annual Convention in Richmond, Virginia on May 16, 1894.

Newton was the father of historian Mary Newton Stanard, who produced a biography of him in 1924.
