= Epiphany Cathedral =

Epiphany Cathedral may refer to:

== Dominican Republic ==
- Episcopal Cathedral of the Epiphany (Santo Domingo)

== Russia ==
- Yelokhovo Cathedral, Moscow

== United States ==
- Epiphany Cathedral (Venice, Florida)
- Cathedral of the Epiphany (Sioux City, Iowa)

== See also ==
- Church of the Epiphany (disambiguation)
