= Jennifer McKenzie (priest) =

American Anglican priest

The Reverend Jennifer McKenzie
- Archdeacon of Wigan and West Lancashire
- Church: Church of England
- Diocese: Diocese of Liverpool
- In office: November 2015 – July 2021
- Predecessor: New post

Orders
- Ordination: June 2004 (deacon) by Peter James Lee; January 2005 (priest) by Charles Keyser

Personal details
- Born: 1963 (age 62–63)
- Denomination: Anglicanism
- Spouse: Ken
- Children: Three
- Education: Auburn University; Virginia Theological Seminary

Jennifer Gaines McKenzie (born 1963) is an American Anglican priest. She served as the Archdeacon of Wigan and West Lancashire in the Diocese of Liverpool, Church of England, 2015–2021; and had previously been a priest in the Diocese of Washington and the Diocese of Virginia in the Episcopal Church (United States).

== Early life and education ==
McKenzie was born in 1963 in Pensacola, Florida, United States. She studied at Auburn University in Alabama, United States, graduating with a Bachelor of Arts (BA) degree in 1988: she majored in French and minored in visual arts. She studied and trained for Holy Orders at Virginia Theological Seminary, an Episcopal seminary, graduating with a Master of Divinity (M.Div.) degree in 2004.

== Ordained ministry ==
McKenzie was ordained in the Episcopal Church as a deacon in June 2004 by Peter James Lee, Bishop of Virginia, during a service at Washington National Cathedral. On 6 January 2005, she was ordained as a priest by Charles L. Keyser, her cousin, the retired Bishop of the Armed Forces, during a service at St David's Episcopal Church in Washington, D.C. From 2004 to 2007, she served as Assistant Rector at St David's Episcopal Church, Washington, D.C. where she had served as seminarian from 2002-2004. She was then Associate Rector of Christ Church, Alexandria, Virginia from July 2007 to March 2009, and Interim Associate Rector of the Church of the Good Shepherd, Burke, Virginia from June 2011 to December 2012. Then, from May 2012 to August 2013, she was priest-in-charge of Epiphany Episcopal Church (Oak Hill, Virginia) in Fairfax County, Virginia.

In August 2015, it was announced that McKenzie would join the Diocese of Liverpool in the Church of England as Archdeacon of Wigan and West Lancashire. On 14 November 2015, she was collated and installed as archdeacon during a service in Liverpool Cathedral. She resigned her archdeaconry on 31 July 2021 to return to America.

Having returned to the United States, McKenzie has been Dean's advisor for new initiatives at Virginia Theological Seminary since 1 September 2021.

== Personal life ==
McKenzie is married to Ken; together, they have three children.
