= William Cabell Brown =

American bishop and missionary

The Right Reverend William Cabell Brown D.D., LL.D.
- Bishop of Virginia
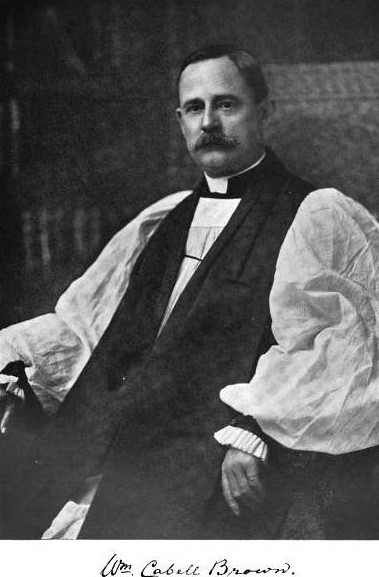
- Church: Episcopal Church
- Diocese: Virginia
- In office: 1919–1927
- Predecessor: Robert Atkinson Gibson
- Successor: Henry St. George Tucker
- Previous post: Assistant Bishop of Virginia (1914–1919)

Orders
- Ordination: August 2, 1891 by Francis McNeece Whittle
- Consecration: October 28, 1914 by Daniel S. Tuttle

Personal details
- Born: November 22, 1861 Lynchburg, Virginia, United States
- Died: July 25, 1927 (aged 65) London, England
- Buried: Emmanuel Church at Brook Hill
- Denomination: Anglican
- Spouse: Ida Mason Dorsey

William Cabell Brown (November 22, 1861 – July 25, 1927) was an Episcopal missionary in Brazil who returned to his native Virginia to become the seventh bishop of Virginia.

== Biography ==
=== Early and family life ===
William Cabell Brown was born in Nelson County, Virginia, his father's fourth son and mother's third child; both parents his parents descended from the First Families of Virginia. His grandfather Alexander Brown emigrated from Scotland to Williamsburg, Virginia at age 15 and studied at the College of William and Mary before moving to Nelson County and marrying Lucy Shands Rives, of a long prominent family. Their only son (together with several daughters), Robert Lawrence Brown (1820-1880) likewise married women from prominent families: first Sarah Cabell Calloway (1820-1849, who bore him two sons and a daughter before her death), and then William's mother Margaret Baldwin Cabell (1826-1877). Robert Brown, a teacher as well as farmer and merchant, supervised young William's education at Norwood high school, as well as the Nelson County schools. William then moved to Alexandria, Virginia where he taught at the Episcopal High School, as well as attended Virginia Theological Seminary, but his father died shortly before his graduation in 1891.

He married Ida Mason Dorsey (born 1866) of Baltimore, granddaughter of U.S. Senator James Murray Mason; they had three surviving sons and two daughters (their first son dying at age three in Brazil).

=== Ministry ===
After graduation, Brown was ordained as a deacon by bishop Francis McNeece Whittle on June 26, 1891, and advanced to the priesthood on August 2, 1891. He then sailed as a missionary to Rio Grande do Sul in Brazil. During his early years in Brazil's southernmost state, Brown translated the Bible and Book of Common Prayer into Portuguese. He also re-established a theological school to train Brazilians for the priesthood, as well as served many missionary congregations and established several parish schools under the leadership of fellow Virginian and VTS graduate, the Right Rev. Lucien Lee Kinsolving. After Brazil's formal establishment as a missionary district in 1907, Brown also expanded the Anglican presence in the country's then capital, Rio de Janeiro, where he had previously occasionally served at chapels permitted under an 1810 English/Portuguese treaty under the guidance of the Anglican Bishop of the Falkland Islands. In 1908 Brown helped found that state's first Brazilian congregation, the Church of the Redeemer, and soon established Trinity Chapel in Méier (then suburb, now a neighborhood). (the Anglican and Episcopalian congregations would only merge near 1965, when the Anglican Episcopal Church of Brazil or Igreja Episcopal Anglicana do Brasil became an independent member of the Anglican Communion).

In 1914 Virginia's Episcopalians recalled Brown to serve as assistant bishop to Bishop Whittle's successor, Bishop Robert Atkinson Gibson, who had had a health scare. Five years previously, Arthur Selden Lloyd had been consecrated as Bishop Coadjutor (with power to succeed) to assist bishop Gibson, but had resigned the position after 14 months to become President of the Episcopal Church's Board of Missions. Upon bishop Lloyd's resignation, the Rev. Berryman Green had twice been selected as bishop Gibson's assistant, but had each time declined. After his second declination (at the Special Council called to select Bishop Gibson's assistant), the clerical and lay delegates selected the absent Brown, although he had earlier declined the position of Bishop of the new diocese of Puerto Rico.

=== Episcopacy ===
Rev. Brown returned to Richmond for consecration in October, 1914. Bishops Gibson of Virginia, Alfred Magill Randolph of the Episcopal Diocese of Southern Virginia and missionary bishop Daniel S. Tuttle of Montana participated in the consecration.

Bishop Brown ultimately succeeded Bishop Gibson, and focused on the diocese's schools during his relatively brief episcopate. In June 1920, the diocese formed the Church Schools Corporation, which purchased three existing boarding schools: St. Anne's in Charlotttesville, and in Richmond the Virginia Randolph Ellett School for Girls and the Chamberlayne School for Boys (renamed St. Catherine's and St. Christopher's schools). It then established St. Margaret's school in Tappahannock and Christchurch school in Urbanna, both in Virginia's Northern Neck. St. Agnes coeducational elementary school was founded in 1924 in Alexandria to complement the all-male Episcopal High School which bishop Brown well knew (but not incorporated into the Church Schools system until World War II, long after bishop Brown's death). Also, the parish school for African Americans in Essex County (the only high school for them in the area, and with five boarders by 1938) was renamed for Archdeacon John Moncure, who had died trying to save a student's life. In 1920, Osgood Memorial and St. Peter's school in Richmond also offered pre-schools and kindergartens as well as day care for African American working parents, and Calvary Mission school had just opened in Hanover County in 1919 (it was divested in 1938 and incorporated into the local public schools).

Bishop Gibson's son in law, Dr. Edmund Lee Woodward, had also returned from missionary work in 1914, in his case as a medical missionary in China. During bishop Brown's episcopate, he became a major fund raiser for the diocese, and also built the vacation retreat called Shrine Mont in Orkney Springs, which was given to the diocese and consecrated by Bishop Brown in 1925. It allowed children from all the diocese's regions to attend summer camp, and exposed urban children to outdoor life, which reformers of the day thought counteracted unhealthy urban living.

In 1926, Bishop Brown requested a coadjutor bishop before his first vacation since his consecration (a voyage to England which was a gift from the diocese). The council elected Henry St. George Tucker, who like bishops Brown and Lloyd had been a missionary as well as related to the First Families of Virginia. The son of the Rt. Rev. Beverley D. Tucker of Southern Virginia (and Ana Maria Washington Tucker, the last Washington born at Mt. Vernon), Tucker had served in Japan since 1899 and had been missionary bishop of Kyoto from 1912 to 1923, although family circumstances required him to resign and move back to Virginia, where he was teaching at the Virginia Theological Seminary.

== Death and legacy ==
Bishop Brown died of a heart attack while traveling in London, but his body was returned for interment in the cemetery of Emmanuel Episcopal Church in Richmond.

Papers relating to the Cabell family are in the special collections division of the University of Virginia library, and the special collections division of the College of William and Mary.

Episcopal Church (USA) titles
Preceded by Robert Atkinson Gibson	Bishop of Virginia; 1919–1927	Succeeded by Henry St. George Tucker
