= John Alfred Baden =

American prelate

The Right Reverend John Alfred Baden D.D.
- Suffragan Bishop of Virginia
- Church: Episcopal Church
- Diocese: Virginia
- Elected: April 28, 1973
- In office: 1973–1979
- Predecessor: Philip Alan Smith
- Successor: David H. Lewis Jr.

Orders
- Ordination: December 1948 by Noble C. Powell
- Consecration: June 30, 1973 by Robert F. Gibson Jr.

Personal details
- Born: May 10, 1913 Washington, D.C., United States
- Died: April 26, 1983 (aged 69) Alexandria, Virginia, United States
- Buried: Virginia Theological Seminary
- Denomination: Anglican
- Parents: John Alfred Baden & Marian Sturgis
- Spouse: Jean Deloris Feaga
- Children: 3

John Alfred Baden (May 10, 1913 - April 26, 1983) was an American prelate who served as the Suffragan Bishop of Virginia from 1973 till 1979.

== Early life and education ==
Baden was born in Washington, D.C. on May 10, 1913, the son of John Alfred Baden and Marian Sturgis. He was educated at the Maryland Park High School and then proceeded to the University of Maryland from where he graduated with a Bachelor of Science in 1939 and a Bachelor of Laws from the National University School of Law in 1939. He married Jean Deloris Feaga on July 11, 1942, and together had three children. Later he trained for the priesthood at the Virginia Theological Seminary and graduated with a Master of Divinity in 1948. The Virginia seminary awarded him a Doctor of Divinity in 1972.

== Ordained ministry ==
Baden was ordained deacon on December 23, 1947, by Bishop Noble C. Powell of Maryland in Trinity Church, Towson, Maryland. He was then ordained priest by the same bishop in December 1948. He served in Trinity Church, Towson, Maryland from 1946 till 1948 and then became rector of St James' Church in Monkton, Maryland and St James' Mission in Parkton, Maryland. In 1958 he became Diocesan Missioner and Executive Secretary of the Department of Missions of the Diocese of Virginia, a post he retained till 1962. Subsequently, between 1959 and 1962, he also served as Archdeacon of Virginia. He served as rector of Frederick Parish responsible of Christ Church and St Paul's-on-the-Hill in Winchester, Virginia between 1962 and 1973.

== Bishop ==
Baden was elected Bishop of Northern Michigan on January 8, 1964, on the seventh ballot, however he declined the election. He was then elected Suffragan Bishop of Virginia in 1973, which he accepted. He was consecrated on June 30, 1973, in Washington National Cathedral by Bishop Robert F. Gibson Jr. of Virginia. During his time as bishop he was involved in assisting Anglican churches in Tanzania and Uganda, when in fact he visited Tanzania in 1975. He retired in 1979.
