= Jennifer McKenzie =

Jennifer McKenzie may refer to:

- Jennifer McKenzie (politician), Canadian politician
- Jennifer McKenzie (priest), American Anglican cleric
