= E. Mark Stevenson =

The Right Reverend E. Mark Stevenson
- XIV Bishop of Virginia
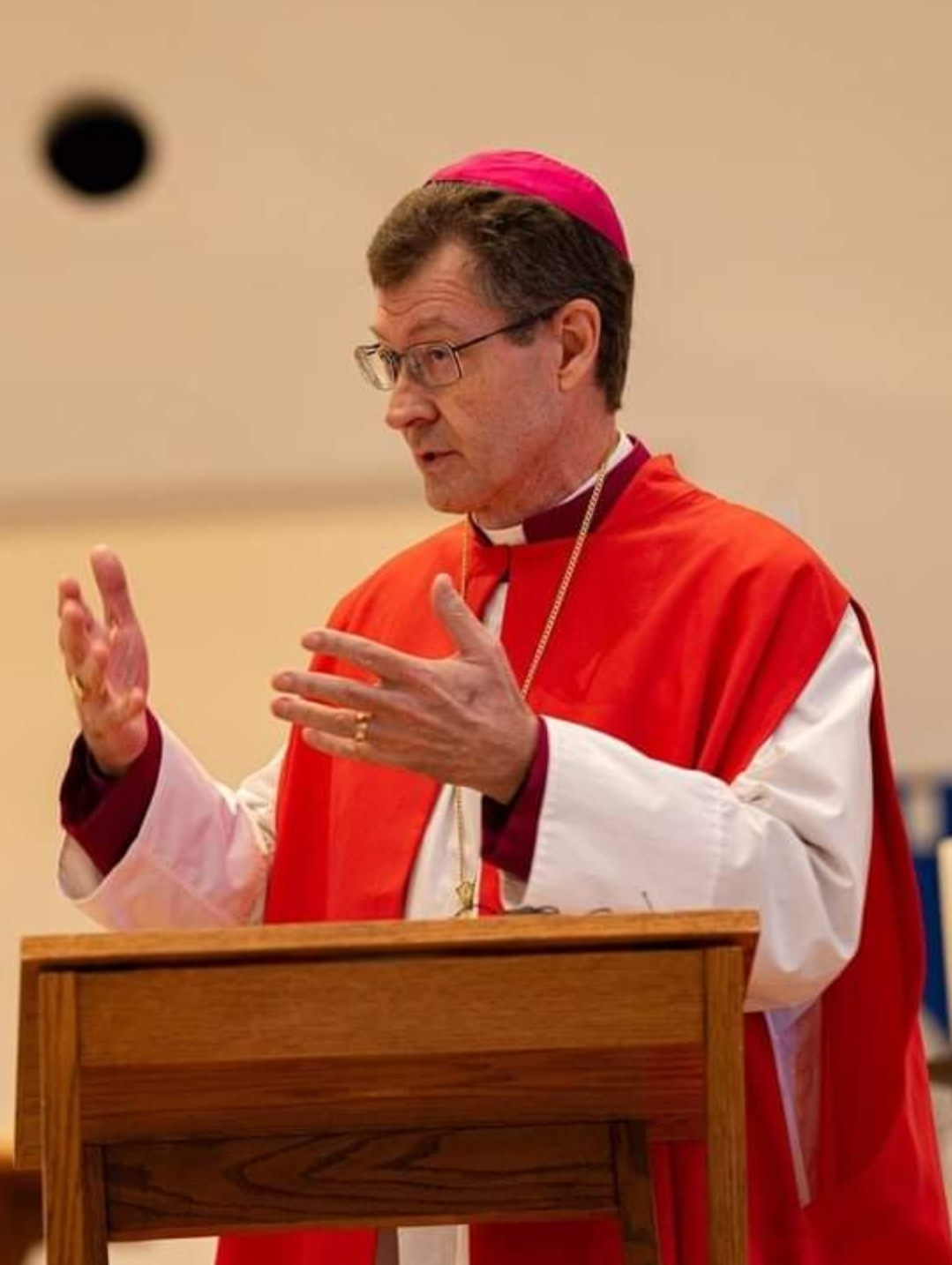
- Church: Episcopal Church
- Diocese: Virginia
- Elected: June 4, 2022
- Predecessor: Shannon Johnston
- Previous post: Canon to the Presiding Bishop for Ministry Within The Episcopal Church

Orders
- Consecration: December 3, 2022 by Michael Bruce Curry

Personal details
- Denomination: Episcopalian
- Spouse: Joyce Owen Stevenson - Jan 14, 1995 - Oct 30, 2024 (her death)
- Education: Bachelor of Science, The University of Illinois (1986); Master of Divinity, cum laude, Nashotah House Theological Seminary (2000)

Edward Mark Stevenson is an American Episcopal bishop serving as the 14th Bishop of Virginia. He was elected on June 4, 2022, and consecrated on December 3, 2022.

== Ordained ministry ==
Stevenson was ordained as a priest in the Episcopal Church on August 5, 2000, and has held multiple leadership roles. He served as rector of the Church of the Annunciation in New Orleans, Louisiana, and the Church of the Good Shepherd in Maitland, Florida.

From August 2005 to September 2013, he was Canon to the Ordinary in the Episcopal Diocese of Louisiana. During this time, he was involved in coordinating relief efforts following Hurricane Katrina.

Stevenson later became Domestic Poverty Missioner for The Episcopal Church. In 2016, he was appointed Director of Episcopal Migration Ministries, overseeing refugee resettlement programs.

In September 2018, he was named Canon to the Presiding Bishop for Ministry Within The Episcopal Church, serving as the principal liaison between Presiding Bishop Michael Curry, the House of Bishops, and other church governing bodies.

== Episcopacy ==
Stevenson was elected Bishop of Virginia on June 4, 2022, at St. Stephen’s and St. Agnes School in Alexandria. His consecration took place on December 3, 2022, at The Saint Paul’s Baptist Church in Richmond, with Presiding Bishop Michael Curry as the chief consecrator.

Episcopal Church (USA) titles
Preceded by Shannon Johnston	Bishop of Virginia; 2022−present	Incumbent
