= Frank Clayton Matthews =

American prelate

The Right Reverend Frank Clayton Matthews D.D.
- Director of Pastoral Development
- Church: Episcopal Church
- Appointed: June 1998
- In office: 1998–2017
- Successor: Todd Ousley
- Previous post: Suffragan Bishop of Virginia (1993-1998)

Orders
- Ordination: April 1974 by Bennett Sims
- Consecration: September 11, 1993 by Edmond L. Browning

Personal details
- Born: December 31, 1947 (age 78) Raleigh, North Carolina, United States
- Denomination: Anglican
- Spouse: Martha Hughes (m. 1969)
- Children: 1

Frank Clayton Matthews (born December 31, 1947) is an American prelate who served as Suffragan Bishop of Virginia between 1993 and 1998 and later as Director of the Office of Pastoral Development.

== Early life and education ==
Matthews was born December 31, 1947, in Raleigh, North Carolina. He was educated at the public schools of Raleigh. He later studied at Hampden–Sydney College from where he graduated with a Bachelor of Arts in 1970. While at Hampden-Sydney he was on the Dean's List and was the recipient of the Algernon Sydney Sullivan Award. He was also a member of Omicron Delta Kappa and Eta Sigma Phi. Matthews married Martha Hughes in June, 1969 and together had one son. He also studied at the Virginia Theological Seminary from where he earned his Master of Divinity in 1973. While at the seminary, he carried out his clinical pastoral education at Austin Hospital, Melbourne in Australia. In May 1994 he was awarded an honorary Doctor of Divinity from the Virginia Seminary.

== Ordained ministry ==
Matthews was ordained deacon in June, 1973 by the Bishop of North Carolina Thomas Fraser, and then as priest in April, 1974, by the Bishop of Atlanta Bennett Sims. From 1973 till 1976 he served as chaplain at Holy Innocents' Episcopal School in Atlanta and subsequently served as assistant priest at Holy Innocents Church. In 1976 he became assistant at Christ Church in New Bern, North Carolina, where he remained till 1979. In 1980, he was appointed rector of Emmanuel Church at Brook Hill, Virginia where the church membership increased to over 900, from 500 at the time of his installation. He also subsequently served as Dean of North Richmond and chaired the diocesan Commission on Ministry. From 1987 and 1994, he served as Canon to the Ordinary of the Diocese of Virginia.

== Bishop ==
On the third ballot, Matthews was elected Suffragan Bishop of Virginia on May 1, 1993, at a special council meeting which took place at the Virginia Theological Seminary. He was then consecrated bishop on September 11, 1993, by Presiding Bishop Edmond L. Browning in the Washington National Cathedral. He resigned the post in 1998 after he was named as Director of the Office of Pastoral Development, a post he retained till his retirement on June 30, 2017.
