= David Colin Jones =

American prelate (born 1943)

The Right Reverend David Colin Jones D.Min.
- Suffragan Bishop of Virginia
- Church: Episcopal Church
- Diocese: Virginia
- Elected: January 27, 1995
- In office: 1995–2012
- Successor: Susan Goff
- Other post: Visiting Bishop in Virginia (2012-present)

Orders
- Ordination: 1968 by Wilburn C. Campbell
- Consecration: June 24, 1995 by Edmond L. Browning

Personal details
- Born: June 20, 1943 (age 82) Youngstown, Ohio, United States
- Denomination: Anglican
- Parents: John Henry Jones & Jean Clark
- Spouse: Mary Kennedy Biddle (m. 1965)
- Children: 2

David Colin Jones (born June 20, 1943) is an American prelate who was a suffragan bishop of the Episcopal Diocese of Virginia, serving from 1995 to 2012.

== Early life and education ==
Jones was born on June 20, 1943, in Youngstown, Ohio, the son of John Henry Jones and Jean Clark. He was raised in Fairmont, West Virginia. He studied at West Virginia University and graduated with a Bachelor of Arts in History in 1965. On June 5, 1965, he married Mary Kennedy Biddle and together has two children. He then enrolled for a Master of Divinity at the Virginia Theological Seminary and graduated in 1968. He also graduated with a Doctor of Ministry from Virginia Theological Seminary in 1991 and was awarded an honorary Doctor of Divinity in 1996.

== Ordained ministry ==
Jones was ordained deacon and priest in 1968, both by the Bishop of West Virginia Wilburn C. Campbell. He then became vicar of St James' Church in Lewisburg, West Virginia, and served till 1972. Between 1972 and 1978 he served as rector of St Stephen's Church in Beckley, West Virginia. In 1978 he became rector of the Church of the Good Shepherd in Burke, Virginia.

== Episcopacy ==
On January 27, 1995, Jones was elected Suffragan Bishop of Virginia and was consecrated on June 24, 1995, in the Washington National Cathedral by Presiding Bishop Edmond L. Browning. He retained the post till his retirement in 2012.
