= David H. Lewis Jr. =

The Right Reverend David Henry Lewis Jr. D.D.
- Suffragan Bishop of Virginia
- Church: Episcopal Church
- Diocese: Virginia
- Elected: October 8, 1979
- In office: 1980–1987
- Predecessor: John Alfred Baden

Orders
- Ordination: April 9, 1943 by Frederick D. Goodwin
- Consecration: February 3, 1980 by John Allin

Personal details
- Born: August 5, 1918 South Boston, Virginia, United States
- Died: May 15, 2002 (aged 83) Virginia, United States
- Buried: St. Paul's Church, Ivy, Virginia
- Denomination: Anglican
- Parents: David Henry Lewis & Louise Thornton Owen
- Spouse: Caroline Lunt Coffman (M. 1942)
- Children: 4

David Henry Lewis Jr. (August 5, 1918 - May 15, 2002) was an American prelate who served as the Suffragan Bishop of Virginia from 1980 till 1987.

== Early life and education ==
Lewis was born in South Boston, Virginia on August 5, 1918, the son of Reverend David Henry Lewis and Louise Thornton Owen. He studied at the University of Virginia from where he graduated in 1939 and proceeded for further studies at the Virginia Theological Seminary from where he graduated in 1942.

== Ordination ==
Lewis was ordained deacon in 1942 and then priest on April 9, 1943, at Abingdon Church in White Marsh, Virginia by Bishop Frederick D. Goodwin. He then served as rector of Abingdon Church, Christchurch, Virginia and St Stephen's Church in Culpeper, Virginia. In 1956 he became rector of St Matthew's Church in Richmond, Virginia.

== Bishop ==
Lewis was elected Suffragan Bishop of Virginia on October 6, 1979, on the fourth ballot of a special convention. He was consecrated on February 3, 1980, in St Paul's Church, Richmond, Virginia by Presiding Bishop John Allin. Lewis retired in 1987.
