= Samuel B. Chilton =

Bishop

The Right Reverend Samuel Blackwell Chilton D.D.
- Suffragan Bishop of Virginia
- Church: Episcopal Church
- Diocese: Virginia
- Elected: January 1960
- In office: 1960–1969

Orders
- Ordination: June 1925 by William Cabell Brown
- Consecration: May 12, 1960 by Arthur C. Lichtenberger

Personal details
- Born: May 27, 1900 Remington, Virginia, United States
- Died: December 26, 1984 (aged 84) Alexandria, Virginia, United States
- Denomination: Anglican
- Parents: Charles Blackwell Chilton & Harriet Glassell Hamilton
- Spouse: Harriet Harrington McMillan
- Children: 3

Samuel Blackwell Chilton (May 27, 1900 - December 26, 1984) was a suffragan bishop of the Episcopal Diocese of Virginia, serving from 1960 to 1969.

== Early life and education ==
Chilton was born on May 27, 1900, in Remington, Virginia, the son of Charles Blackwell Chilton and Harriet Whiting Scott Glassell Hamilton. He studied at the Virginia Polytechnic Institute between 1918 and 1920 and then at the University of Virginia from which he graduated with a Bachelor of Arts in 1921. He also studied at the Virginia Theological Seminary and graduated in 1924 with a Bachelor of Divinity. He married Harriet Harrington McMillan on September 3, 1925, and together they had three children. He was awarded an honorary Doctor of Divinity in 1957.

== Ordained ministry ==
In June 1924, Chilton was ordained deacon and became deacon-in-charge of St Paul's Church in Hanover, Virginia. A year later, in June 1925, he was ordained priest by Bishop William Cabell Brown of Virginia. He was appointed rector of the same church in 1925 and served there till 1941. He also served as rector St Peter's Church in Talleysville, Virginia from 1928 till 1938. From 1941 to 1954, he served as secretary-treasurer of the Diocese of Virginia, and then in 1954 became the Archdeacon of Virginia, a post he retained till 1960.

== Bishop ==
Chilton was elected Suffragan Bishop of Virginia in January 1960 on the third ballot. He was consecrated on May 12, 1960, at Grace and Holy Trinity Church in Richmond, Virginia by Presiding Bishop Arthur C. Lichtenberger. He retained his post till 1969. He died at Alexandria Hospital after a stroke on December 26, 1984.
