= Church of the Epiphany =

Church of the Epiphany may refer to:

== Australia ==
- Church of the Epiphany, Meredith, Victoria, Australia

== United Kingdom ==
- Church of the Epiphany, Austwick, North Yorkshire, England
- Church of the Epiphany, Tockwith, North Yorkshire, England
- Church of the Epiphany, Gipton, West Yorkshire, England

== Russia ==
- Church of the Epiphany (Saint Petersburg)

== United States ==
- Church of the Epiphany (Los Angeles), California
- Church of the Epiphany (San Francisco), California
- Church of the Epiphany (Washington, D.C.)
- Church of the Epiphany (Chicago), Illinois
- Church of the Epiphany (Episcopal, Manhattan), New York
- Church of the Epiphany (Roman Catholic, Manhattan), New York
- Church of the Epiphany (Philadelphia), Pennsylvania
- Church of the Epiphany (Pittsburgh), Pennsylvania
- Church of the Epiphany (Chantilly, Virginia)
- Church of the Epiphany (Oak Hill, Virginia)
- Church of the Epiphany (East Providence, Rhode Island), Rhode Island

== See also ==
- Oxford Mission Epiphany Church, Barisal, Bangladesh
