= St. Margaret's Episcopal Church (Woodbridge, Virginia) =

Coordinates: 38°38′27″N 77°21′53″W

St. Margaret's Episcopal Church Woodbridge
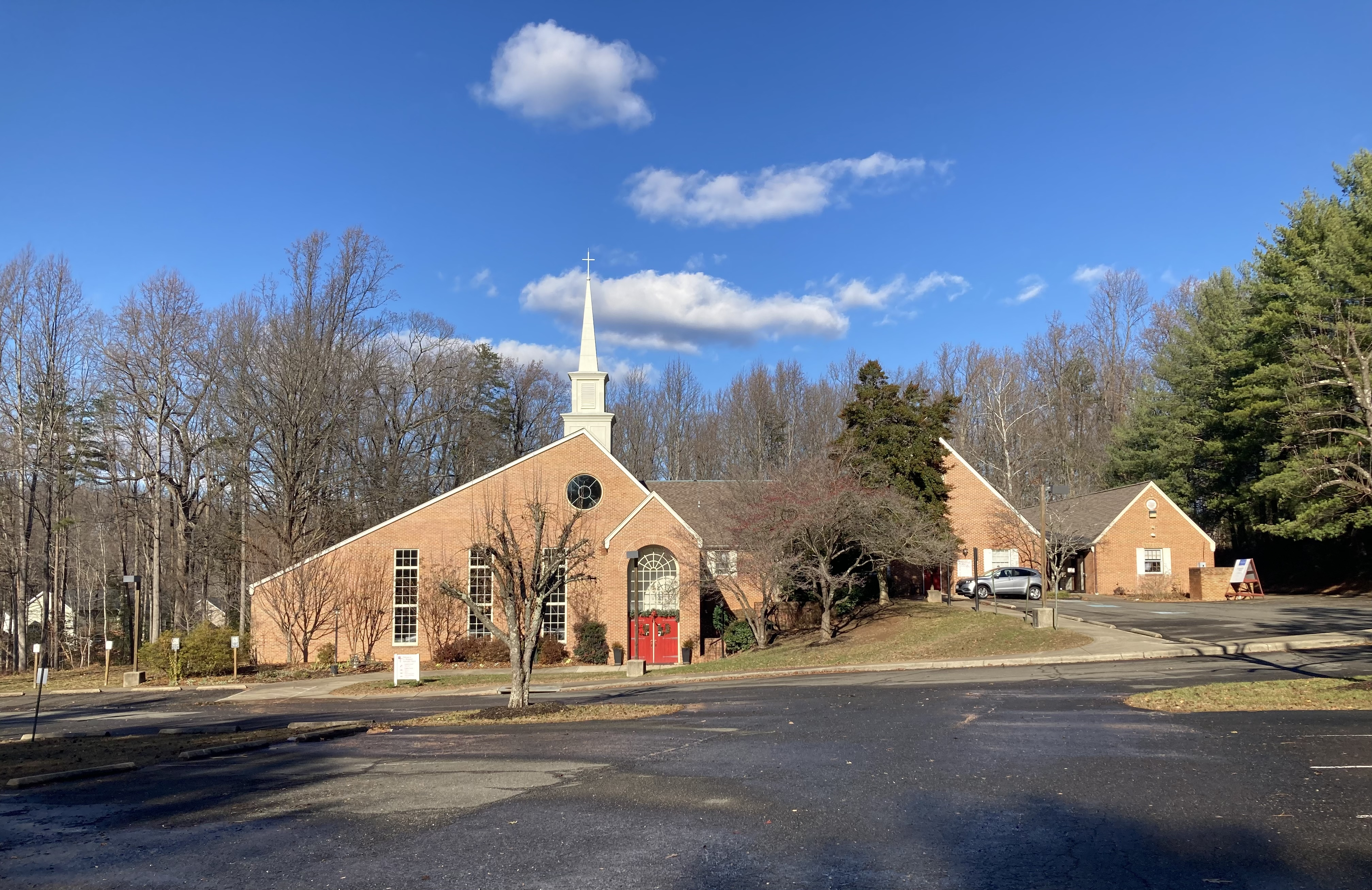
- St. Margaret's Episcopal Church Woodbridge
- Location: 5290 Saratoga Lane; Woodbridge, Virginia 22193
- Country: United States
- Denomination: Episcopal
- Website: http://www.stmargaretsepiscopalva.org

History
- Founded: 1963
- Dedicated: October 1964

Administration
- Diocese: Episcopal Diocese of Virginia
- Parish: St. Margaret's

Clergy
- Bishop: Shannon Johnston
- Rector: Rev. Margaret Peel

St. Margaret's Episcopal Church is an Episcopal church in Woodbridge, Virginia. The only Episcopal Church in eastern Prince William County, it belongs to the Episcopal Diocese of Virginia as part of the worldwide Anglican Communion, that fellowship of churches having a common heritage in the Church of England and in communion with the Archbishop of Canterbury.

== History ==
The faith community was reestablished in 1963, as parishioners from St. Martin's Episcopal Church in Dumfries and Pohick Episcopal Church purchased property below Bel Air, the historic former home of Parson Weems, rector of Dumfries parish after the American Revolutionary War and famous for his anecdotes concerning George Washington. The disestablishment of the Anglican church in Virginia in 1786, coupled with the Glebe Act of 1802 (which authorized the state to seize church property), had crippled the Anglican (now Episcopal) church in the state, and Parson Weems supported himself as a bookseller, as well as managed his wife's properties.

Nonetheless, as (sub)urbanization spread after World War II, Prince William county once again could support a parish, and this parish first met in Fred Lynn Junior High School during construction. St. Margaret's parish reorganized in 2007, after much of the congregation broke away in disputes over the ordination of women and the first openly gay bishop, Eugene Robinson. Litigation concerning that schism took many years, but was resolved in favor of the Episcopal Church in 2012.

In 2013, the departing congregation took the name Immanuel Anglican Church, which also spawned the nearby All Saints Anglican Church.

== Current ==
St. Margaret's Episcopal Church is a church that welcomes everyone. It offers many opportunities for involvement, both as a way of getting to know people and a way of sharing special talents and interests. The congregation invites individuals to participate at the level that is appropriate for them, where you can call it home, use your talents, and encounter Christ in your worship as well as see Christ in your daily life.

Through holy scripture, prayers, songs, Holy Communion, education, service projects, and fellowship we grow in our love and understanding of God, our relationship with Jesus Christ and our life in the Kingdom of God.
