= Emmanuel Church at Brook Hill =

Historic church in Virginia, US

- U.S. National Register of Historic Places
- Virginia Landmarks Register
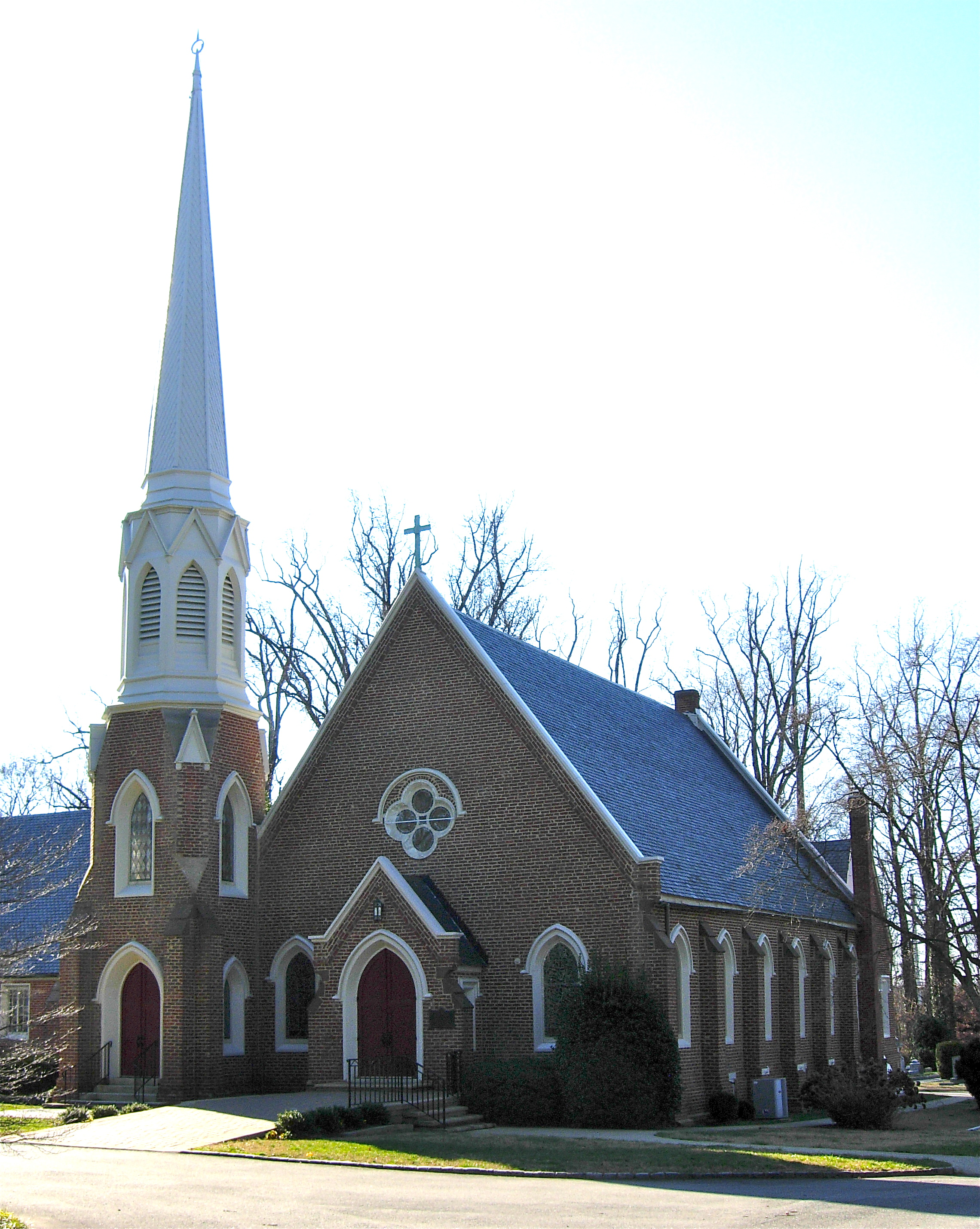

- Location within Virginia Location within the United States
- Location: 1214 Wilmer Ave., Brook Hill, Henrico County, Virginia
- Coordinates: 37°36′21″N 77°27′31″W
- Area: 12.6 acres (5.1 ha)
- Built: 1860
- Architect: Hall, Clifton A.
- Architectural style: Gothic Revival
- NRHP reference No.: 99001720
- VLR No.: 043-0103

Significant dates
- Added to NRHP: February 3, 2000
- Designated VLR: September 15, 1999

The Emmanuel Church at Brook Hill, in the historic community of Brook Hill in Henrico County, Virginia, is a historic Episcopal church.

== History ==
Brothers John and Daniel Kerr Stewart, both born on the Island of Bute in Scotland, emigrated and established a farm at Brook Hill. Although they had been members of Monumental Church and then St. Paul's Church, both in downtown Richmond, Virginia, their property was on the city's outskirts. The early Brook turnpike between Richmond and Dabney Williamson's Tavern had become a major thoroughfare during the American Revolution. Between 1859 and 1860, the Stewart brothers supported creation of a new parish near their farm, which was organized in 1860.

Bishop John Johns consecrated the building on July 6, 1860. The mission church's first rector was Rev. Richard Hooker Wilmer, a friend of John Stewart and future Confederate Bishop (elected to the Episcopal Diocese of Alabama in 1862.

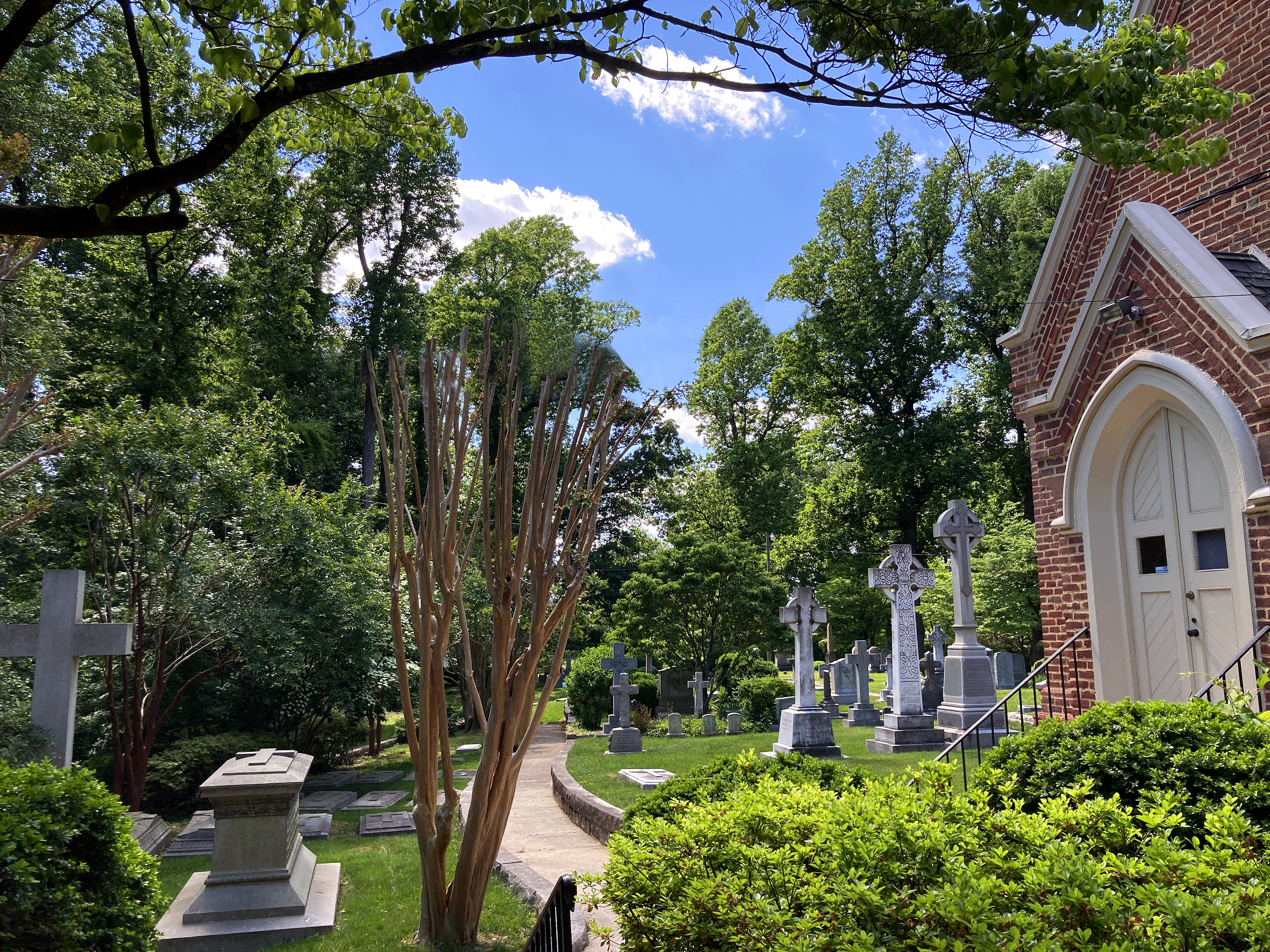
Emmanuel Episcopal Church (1860) cemetery, located in Henrico County, Virginia.

During the American Civil War, troops often traveled on Brook Road, almost in front of this church. Both armies at various times occupied the building, often using it as a hospital. Nearby Virginia historical markers describe Sheridan's maneuvers in 1864, Richmond's outer defenses on the road, and the renaming of the entire road between Petersburg and Alexandria Virginia as Jefferson Davis Highway between 1913 and 1947.

The church built a school in 1910, and a parish hall in the 1957. The parish has also been known for its social activism. John Stewart's daughter Marian, who married George William Peterkin (who became the first Bishop of West Virginia), wrote about its mottos: "God is with us" and "the effectual fervent prayer of a righteous man availeth much". Virginia's seventh bishop, William Cabell Brown, a former missionary in Brazil, is also interred in the graveyard. Immediately in front of the church, in addition to a historic marker concerning the church, is a marker commemorating artist and suffragette Adele Goodman Clark.

== Architecture ==
The church and church school (built in 1910), as well as the cemetery were listed on the National Register of Historic Places in 2000.

Rhode Island architect Clifton A. Hall designed the church.

Richard Hooker Wilmer, the only bishop to be consecrated by the Episcopal Church in the Confederate States of America, is buried in the church cemetery, as are many Confederate soldiers.

Adèle Goodman Clark is also buried here.
