= Robert Atkinson Gibson =

American bishop (1846–1919)

The Right Reverend Robert Atkinson Gibson D.D., LL.D.
- Bishop of Virginia
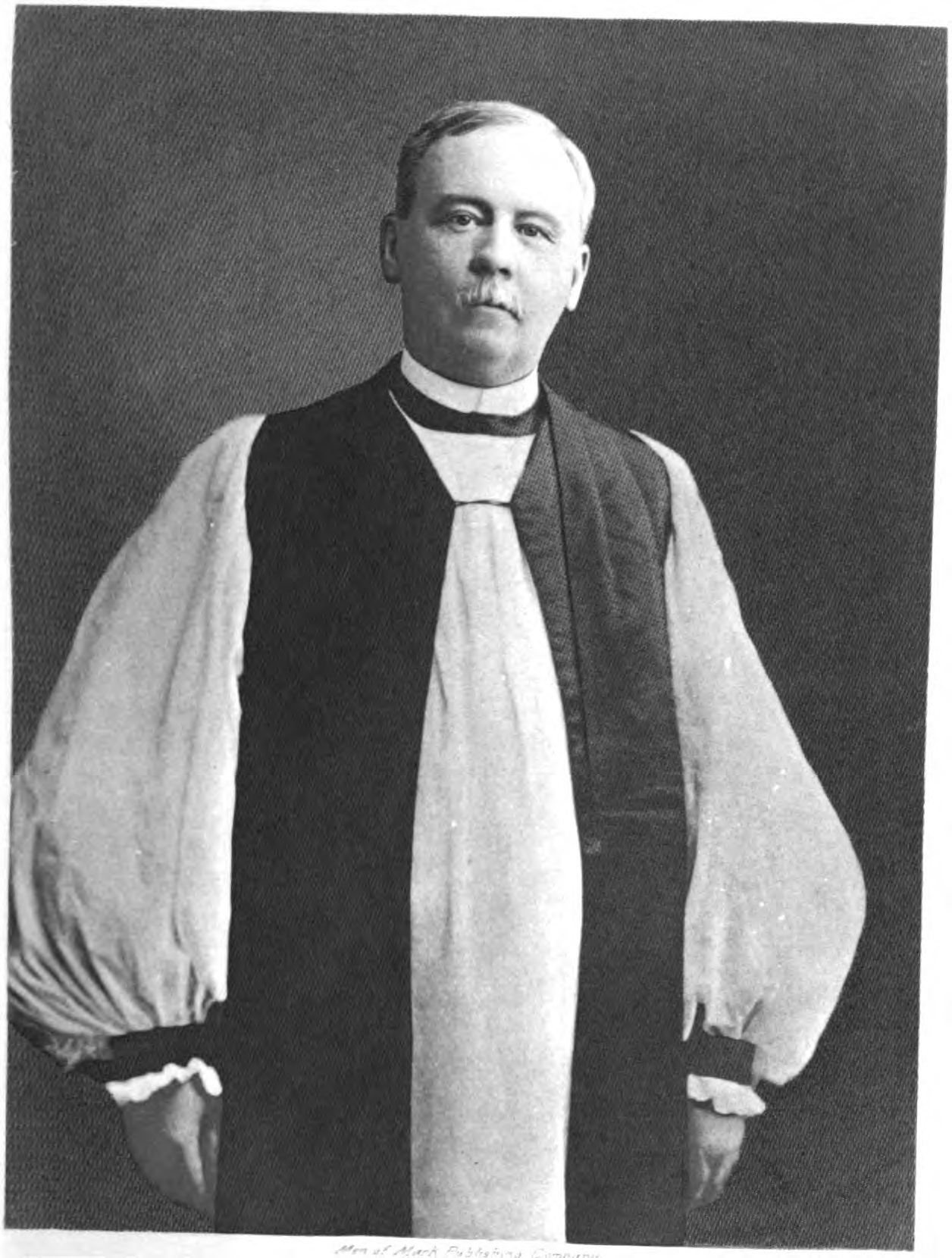
- Church: Episcopal Church
- Diocese: Virginia
- In office: 1902–1919
- Predecessor: Francis McNeece Whittle
- Successor: William Cabell Brown
- Previous post: Assistant Bishop of Virginia (1897–1902)

Orders
- Ordination: July 4, 1871 by John Johns
- Consecration: November 3, 1897 by Francis McNeece Whittle

Personal details
- Born: July 9, 1846 Petersburg, Virginia, United States
- Died: February 17, 1919 (aged 72) Richmond, Virginia, United States
- Buried: Hollywood Cemetery (Richmond, Virginia)
- Denomination: Anglican
- Parents: Churchill J. Gibson & Lucy Fitzhugh Atkinson
- Spouse: Susan Baldwin Stuart

Robert Atkinson Gibson (July 9, 1846 – February 17, 1919) was the sixth Episcopal bishop of Virginia.

== Biography ==
=== Early life ===
Robert Atkinson Gibson was born in Petersburg, Virginia to the founder and long-time rector of Grace Church, Rev. Churchill Gibson (1819–1895) and his wife Lucy Fitzhugh Atkinson Gibson. His formal education began at Episcopal High School at Alexandria, Virginia, from where he transferred to Mount Laurel Academy; he then attended Hampden–Sydney College near Farmville. However, he interrupted his studies in 1864 to volunteer with Virginia's First Rockbridge Artillery, not returning to Hampden–Sydney until after the Confederacy surrendered at Appomattox in 1865. Upon graduating in 1867, Gibson enrolled at the Virginia Theological Seminary, from which he graduated in 1870 and was ordained as a deacon on July 24 by Bishop Whittle. Kenyon College in Ohio awarded him an honorary doctorate of Divinity in 1897, as did University of the South.

=== Ministry ===
As deacon, Gibson worked to revive parishes in five counties along the James River in southeastern Virginia. On July 4, 1871, Bishop John Johns ordained him as a priest in Petersburg. Gibson then served as assistant to the Rev. Joshua Peterkin at St. James Episcopal Church in Richmond from 1872 to 1878. He then moved to Parkersburg, West Virginia where he served as rector of Trinity Church until 1887, when he accepted a position in Cincinnati, Ohio and continued as rector of Christ Church (which became that city's cathedral when another church was destroyed in 1937) until 1897, when his native diocese called him back to assist bishop Whittle.

=== Episcopacy ===
Consecrated on November 3, 1897, bishop Gibson served under bishop Whittle for five years until the latter's death, handling most diocesan visitations as well as administration for several years. While also a popular society figure in Richmond, bishop Gibson became known for his simplicity, sincerity and reverent conduct. Upon returning to Virginia, he bought a summer cottage near Orkney Springs, Virginia, which was expanded after his death into Shrine Mont, a diocesan retreat center.

Rather than immediately appoint a coadjutor as probable successor, Gibson created three archdeacons with specific charges. One archdeacon specialized in administrative matters, another was assigned to "Colored Work", and a third (the Rev. Frederick Neve) expanded the diocese's ministry into isolated rural areas, building schools and churches in the Blue Ridge Mountains with the help of deaconesses. Bishop Gibson also designed the diocesan seal for the 1907 General Convention that met in Richmond (which last hosted in 1859), which remains in use today. Most of Virginia's black parishes were founded during his episcopate.

Bishop Gibson also sought to repossess, restore and reopen many colonial churches (especially in the Tidewater region) which had fallen into ruin. While the Episcopal Diocese of Southern Virginia split off from that of Virginia during Bishop Whittle's episcopate in 1892, with much of the central and southern Tidewater region, the diocese of Virginia split further as anticipated, creating the Episcopal Diocese of Southwestern Virginia in 1919 (for lands south of the James River but not in the Diocese of Southern Virginia)..

In 1907 the General Convention met in Richmond to honor the 300th anniversary of the Jamestown Settlement. When it was over, and especially since Bishop Gibson wanted to travel to London for the Pan Anglican Congress of Mission as well as the once-per-decade Lambeth Conference, he sought help, requesting the special diocesan council elect a coadjutor in 1908. However, the first choice, the Rev. Berryman Green, declined.

In 1909, the Diocesan council met again and elected the Rev. Arthur Selden Lloyd as Bishop Coadjutor, but he resigned the position 14 months later to become President of the Episcopal Church's Board of Missions, which position he left in 1921 to become Suffragan Bishop in the Diocese of New York, where he served until his death in 1936. Upon bishop Lloyd's resignation, William Cabell Brown, who had been a missionary in Brazil, was elected Bishop Coadjutor, and recalled. He ultimately succeeded Bishop Gibson.

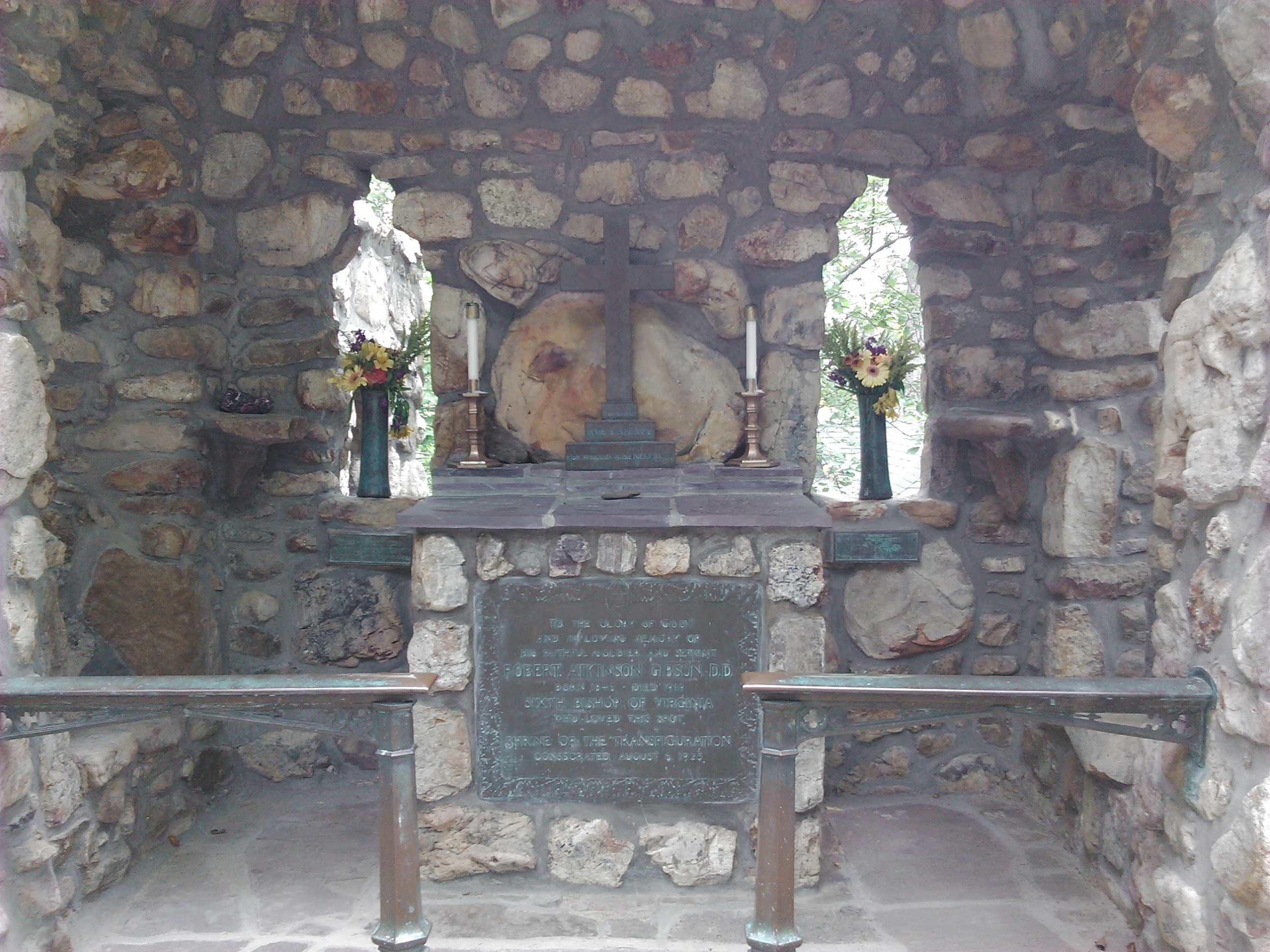
Shrine Mont altar

== Family ==
Gibson married Susan Baldwin Stuart on November 12, 1872. They had two sons (the Rev. Alexander Stuart Gibson and the Rev. Churchill J. Gibson) and three daughters (Lucy and Mary did not marry, but Frances married missionary the Rev. Edmund Lee Woodward).

== Death and legacy ==
Bishop Gibson died in Richmond and is buried at Hollywood Cemetery.

The altar in the diocese's open-air Cathedral Shrine of the Transfiguration at Shrine Mont, built by Woodward after his retirement with the assistance of two local men, is dedicated in his memory, and a cottage named after him. The Gibson Memorial Chapel at the Blue Ridge School (which opened in 1910 as the Blue Ridge Industrial School) was built in 1929, named in his honor, and in 1993 was listed on the National Register of Historic Places. Bishop Gibson's likeness also flanks that of George Washington in the stained glass window of Grace Church in The Plains, Virginia.

Episcopal Church (USA) titles
Preceded by Francis McNeece Whittle	Bishop of Virginia; 1902–1919	Succeeded by William Cabell Brown
