= Mary Newton Stanard =

American historian (1865–1929)

- Born: Mary Newton; 1865; Westmoreland County
- Died: 5 June 1929
- Occupations: Historian, writer
- Spouse: William Glover Stanard

Mary Mann Page Newton Stanard (1865 - June 5, 1929) was an American historian, specializing in the history of Virginia.

Born in Westmoreland County, Mary Newton was the daughter of the Right Reverend John Brockenbrough Newton and Roberta Page Newton (née Williamson. She began her education in local schools before attending, and graduating from, the Leache-Wood School in Norfolk. On April 17, 1900, she married William Glover Stanard, at the time the corresponding secretary of the Virginia Historical Society, and with him took up residence in Richmond. Stanard's career as a historian began when she and her husband published The Colonial Virginia Register in 1902; in 1907 her first solo work, The Story of Bacon's Rebellion, appeared. She wrote and edited a number of books covering various aspects of Virginia history, and produced biographies of her father Bishop Newton, Edgar Allan Poe, and John Marshall. Until her death, Stanard was historian of the Association for the Preservation of Virginia Antiquities; she also served as vice-president of the state chapter of the Colonial Dames of America, and was a member of the executive committees of the Edgar Allan Poe Shrine and the Virginia War History Commission. She died in Richmond. She was buried in Hollywood Cemetery.

== Works ==
- The colonial Virginia register; a list of governors, councillors and other higher officials, and also of members of the House of Burgesses and revolutionary conventions of the colony of Virginia (with William G. Stanard, 1902)
- The story of Bacon's rebellion (1907)
- The dreamer; a romantic rendering of the life-story of Edgar Allan Poe (1909)
- John Marshall (1913)
- Colonial Virginia: its people and customs (1917)
- Richmond: its people and its story (1923)
- John Brockenbrough Newton, a biographical sketch (1924)
- Edgar Allan Poe letters till now unpublished: in the Valentine museum, Richmond, Virginia (edited, 1925)
- The story of Virginia's first century (1928)
