= Gibson Memorial Chapel and Martha Bagby Battle House at Blue Ridge School =

- U.S. National Register of Historic Places
- Virginia Landmarks Register
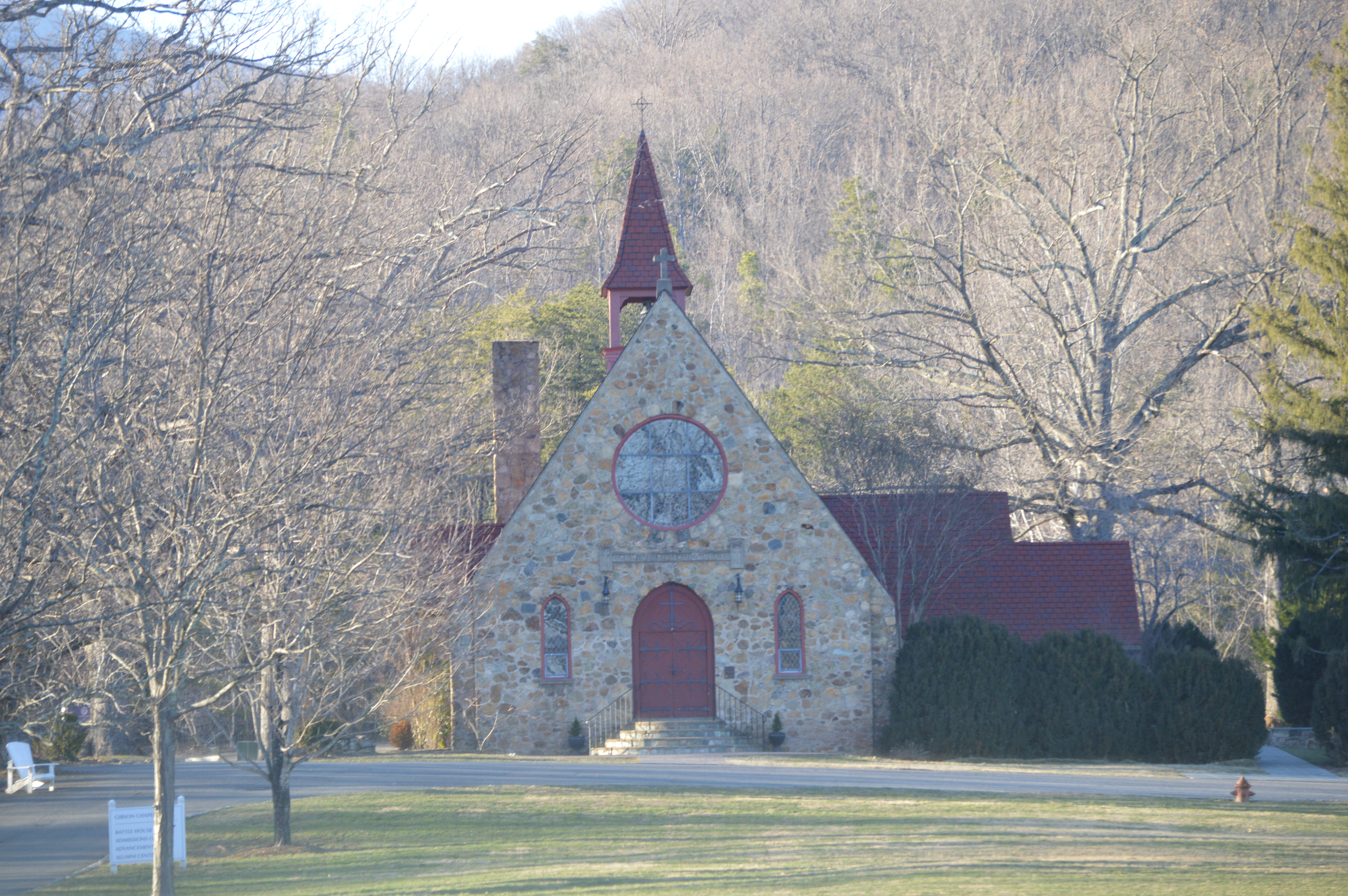
- Front of the chapel

- Location within Virginia Location within the United States
- Location: VA 627 W side, NW of jct. with VA 810, near Dyke, Virginia
- Coordinates: 38°16′00″N 78°33′24″W
- Area: 2.1 acres (0.85 ha)
- Built: 1929
- Architect: Ralph Adams Cram, Stanislaus Makielski
- Architectural style: Late 19th And 20th Century Revivals, Gothic Revival
- NRHP reference No.: 93000349
- VLR No.: 039-0041, 039-0042

Significant dates
- Added to NRHP: April 29, 1993
- Designated VLR: February 17, 1993

Gibson Memorial Chapel and Martha Bagby Battle House at Blue Ridge School is a historic Episcopal chapel and home located on the grounds of Blue Ridge School near Dyke, Greene County, Virginia.

The Gibson Memorial Chapel was designed by noted Boston architect Ralph Adams Cram and built between 1929 and 1932. It is a six-bay, gable-roofed chapel is built on a modified cruciform plan. The chapel is built entirely of uncut and uncoursed native fieldstone and is executed in the Gothic Revival style. It is named after Robert Atkinson Gibson (1846-1919), the sixth Episcopal Bishop of Virginia.

The Martha Bagby Battle House, also known as the Headmaster's House, was completed in 1934. It consists of a two-story, four-bay, hipped-roof center section extended by protruding one- and two-story bays on all sides. The house is constructed of uncut and uncoursed native fieldstone and is in the English Gothic style.

It was listed on the National Register of Historic Places in 1993.
