= Robert Bruce Hall =

American bishop

The Right Reverend Robert Bruce Hall D.D.
- Bishop of Virginia
- Church: Episcopal Church
- Diocese: Virginia
- In office: 1974-1985
- Predecessor: Robert F. Gibson Jr.
- Successor: Peter James Lee
- Previous post: Coadjutor Bishop of Virginia (1966–1974)

Orders
- Ordination: May 1950 by Robert E. L. Strider Sr.
- Consecration: October 21, 1966 by John E. Hines

Personal details
- Born: January 27, 1921 Wheeling, West Virginia, United States
- Died: May 27, 1985 (aged 64) Richmond, Virginia, United States
- Denomination: Anglican
- Parents: Kent Bruce Hall & Mary Ellen Hazlett
- Spouse: Dorothy Varner Glass
- Children: 5

Robert Bruce Hall (January 17, 1921 – May 25, 1985) was bishop of the Episcopal Diocese of Virginia, serving from 1974 to 1985.

== Biography ==
Hall was born on May 27, 1921, in Wheeling, West Virginia. He graduated from Trinity College and the Episcopal Theological Seminary in Cambridge, Massachusetts. He also served in the US Army during World War II. In 1949 he was ordained deacon in June 1949 and priest in May 1950. He served as curate, then associate rector and later as rector of Trinity Church in Huntington, West Virginia; after 1958, he was rector of St Chrysostom's Church in Chicago.

In 1966 he was elected and consecrated Coadjutor Bishop of Virginia, with the right of succession upon the retirement, resignation or death of Bishop Gibson. He succeeded in 1974 after Gibson's retirement. During his time as bishop of Virginia he was involved in sanctioning the irregular ordination of women as priests in his diocese. In 1974 he sanctioned services presided over by the Reverend Alison Cheek of Annandale, Virginia in Charlottesville, Virginia. When the General Convention reversed the decision and opened ordination to women in addition to men in September 1976, Bishop Hall lifted his sanctions. On January 2, 1977, he ordained Patricia Laura Merchant Park, the first female priest in Virginia with the approval of the church.

In 1980 Bishop Hall once again made headlines when he announced that he would seek assistance in overcoming his alcohol addiction. He entered St Mary's Rehabilitation Hospital in Minneapolis and on February 9 for six weeks. He was extensively supported by the Diocesan Standing Committee and its executive board. He died in office on May 27, 1985.
