= Susan Goff =

American prelate of the Episcopal Church

The Right Reverend Susan E. Goff
- Suffragan Bishop and Ecclesiastical Authority of Virginia
- Church: Episcopal Church
- Diocese: Virginia
- Elected: April 21, 2012
- In office: 2012–2022

Orders
- Ordination: 1980
- Consecration: July 28, 2012 by Katharine Schori

Personal details
- Denomination: Anglicanism
- Spouse: Tom Holliday
- Education: Douglass College; Union Theological Seminary (New York City)

Susan Ellyn Goff is an American prelate of the Episcopal Church. She was elected and consecrated as Suffragan Bishop of Virginia in 2012. She became Ecclesiastical Authority of the diocese in 2018 upon the retirement of Shannon Johnston, thirteenth bishop of the diocese. She retired at the end of 2022.

== Early life and education ==
Goff was educated at Douglass College, then a woman's liberal arts college in New Brunswick, New Jersey. She trained for ordination at the Union Theological Seminary in New York City, and achieved a distinction in her Master of Divinity (M.Div.) degree.

== Ordained ministry ==
Goff was ordained in 1980. She has spent all of her ordained ministry in the Episcopal Diocese of Virginia.

On July 28, 2012, Goff was consecrated a bishop during a service at St. Paul's Episcopal Church in Richmond, Virginia. The chief consecrator was Katharine Jefferts Schori (the Presiding Bishop of the Episcopal Church), and the co-consecrators included Shannon S. Johnston (then Bishop of Virginia).

== See also ==
- List of Episcopal bishops of the United States
- Historical list of the Episcopal bishops of the United States
