= Peter Lee (bishop of Virginia) =

20th and 21st-century American Episcopal bishop (1938–2022)

The Right Reverend Peter James Lee D.D., D.Litt.
- Bishop of Virginia
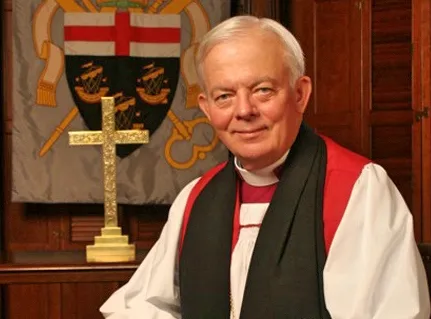
- Lee in 2022
- Church: Episcopal Church
- Diocese: Virginia
- In office: 1985–2009
- Predecessor: Robert Bruce Hall
- Successor: Shannon Sherwood Johnston
- Previous post: Coadjutor Bishop of Virginia (1984-1985)

Orders
- Ordination: 1968
- Consecration: 19 May 1984 by John Allin

Personal details
- Born: May 11, 1938 Greenville, Mississippi, United States
- Died: July 2, 2022 (aged 84) Chapel Hill, North Carolina, U.S.
- Denomination: Anglican
- Parents: Erling Norman Lee and Marion O'Brien
- Spouse: Kristina Knapp (m. 28 August 1965)
- Children: 2

Peter James Lee (11 May 1938 - 2 July 2022) was an American bishop of the Episcopal Church.

== Ministry ==
Lee, a former newspaper reporter, was ordained deacon in 1967 and priest in 1968. He served as deacon at St John's Cathedral in Jacksonville, Florida, from 1967 till 1968, and then as assistant minister at St John's Church in Washington, D.C., till 1971. He served as Rector at the Chapel of the Cross (Chapel Hill, North Carolina) from 1971 to 1984.

Elected Coadjutor Bishop in the Diocese of Virginia, the largest Episcopal diocese in the country, Lee was consecrated and served from 1984 to 1985, until the sudden death of Bishop Robert Bruce Hall. Lee then served as bishop from 1985 until his own retirement in 2009, having Shannon Sherwood Johnston as Coadjutor Bishop in his final years.

Beginning early in Lee's episcopate, several conservative congregations stopped paying diocesan dues, citing objections to the ordination of women priests, as authorized by the General Convention. The controversy metamorphosed, with the stated primary objections changing to matters of sexuality with the consecration of bishop Gene Robinson of the Episcopal Diocese of New Hampshire in 2003, and the election of Katharine Jefferts Schori as Presiding Bishop in 2006. Two large Virginia parishes attracted national attention by attempting to leave the Diocese and associate with an African diocese while keeping their Virginia churches and other property. Lee sued to have the facilities declared the property of the Diocese, and was ultimately successful, although that resolution only happened under his successor.

From 2009 to 2010, Lee officiated as Interim Dean at the Grace Cathedral (San Francisco). He served the General Theological Seminary of New-York in the same position from 2010 to 2011. Then he moved to France and became Interim Dean and Rector at the Cathedral Church of the Holy Trinity in Paris in 2011 and 2012. From 2013 to 2014, he was Provisional Bishop in the Diocese of East Carolina. In November 2015, he was announced as the Assisting Bishop in the Episcopal Diocese of North Carolina.

== Honors and awards ==
Lee was made a Commander (Brother) of the Order of Saint John in 2015.

== Personal life ==
Lee was married to Kristina Knapp (Kristy) Lee. They have two children, daughter Stewart and son James, and five grandchildren. Peter Lee died on July 2, 2022, in Chapel Hill, North Carolina.

Episcopal Church (USA) titles
Preceded by Robert Bruce Hall	Bishop of Virginia; 1985–2009	Succeeded by Shannon Johnston
