= Church of the Epiphany (San Francisco) =

Catholic church in California, US

Coordinates: 37°42′57″N 122°26′4″W

- Church of the Epiphany
- Location: 827 Vienna Street; San Francisco, California
- Country: United States
- Denomination: Catholic Church
- Sui iuris church: Latin Church
- Website: http://www.epiphanysf.com

History
- Founded: 1911

Clergy
- Pastor: Rev. Eugene D. Tungol

The Church of the Epiphany is a Catholic church under the Archdiocese of San Francisco. It is located in the Excelsior District near Crocker Amazon Park.

== History ==
The parish began as a mission church of Saint John the Evangelist. The church was built in 1911 and dedicated by Archbishop Riordan. The building, located on the southwest corner of Russia Avenue and Paris Street, was a wood-frame building with a shingle roof. It seated about three hundred people. This church was built for people who had settled in the Crocker Amazon and Excelsior districts at a cost of $18,613.40. The first rectory was at 33 Persia Street and served as a multi-purpose center. Religious education and parish events shared space with the priests.

In 1922 Corpus Christi, up to that time an Italian National Parish, became a territorial parish. The boundaries of Saint Michael, Saint John the Evangelist and the Church of the Epiphany changed. Epiphany had outgrown the original building. The church was split in half and each section was placed on barrels and logs and pushed up the hill to Naples and Amazon Streets. The sections were set twenty-three feet apart and new construction joined the two halves. The church could now seat 480 people. In June, 1922 construction of a new rectory for the priests began on the corner of Amazon and Vienna Streets. The rectory was dedicated on January 5, 1923.

On August 16, 1938, the School of the Epiphany was opened with 239 students under the care of the Sisters of the Presentation. In 1949 construction began to expand the school to accommodate a second class for each grade and to add the convent.

The parish continued to grow. Even the expanded church could not hold the people. Architect William Schirmer, under the watchful eye of Monsignor O'Keefe, designed the plans for the present Church which was built by Cahill Construction of San Francisco. It took over a year to complete. Construction of the present Church, completed in July, 1950 has a seating capacity of 840 people. Recognizing the growing needs of youth, the old church was converted to a gymnasium.

The parish continues to evolve. Since the early 1970s there has been a rather dramatic demographic shift in the neighborhood. The parish was built on the faith, determination and generosity of Irish, Italian and German families, many of whom have subsequently moved to suburbs. In this demographic shift the parish has been blessed by the rich faith life of the Hispanic and Filipino families. A weekly Spanish Mass began to be celebrated in O'Keefe Hall in 1966. Because of the increase in attendance the Mass was moved to the Church at 6:30 p.m. In 1990 the Spanish Mass was moved to Sunday morning.

In 1999 the averaged 3912 people at Sunday Masses. There are 3579 registered families in the parish; 623 students enrolled in the parish school; and 490 students enrolled in the School of Religion and Confirmation Programs. In 1999 they celebrated 253 Baptisms, 177 First Communions, 75 Confirmations, 44 Weddings and 149 Funerals. Over two hundred people serve the parish as liturgical ministers, catechists and coaches.
