= Robert F. Gibson Jr. =

American bishop

The Right Reverend Robert F. Gibson Jr. D.D.
- Bishop of Virginia
- Church: Episcopal Church
- Diocese: Virginia
- In office: 1961–1974
- Predecessor: Frederick D. Goodwin
- Successor: Robert Bruce Hall
- Previous posts: Suffragan Bishop of Virginia (1949–1954); Coadjutor Bishop of Virginia (1954–1960)

Orders
- Ordination: December 1940 by Frederick D. Goodwin
- Consecration: September 8, 1949 by Henry St. George Tucker

Personal details
- Born: November 22, 1906 Williamsport, Pennsylvania, United States
- Died: September 21, 1990 (aged 83) Richmond, Virginia, United States
- Denomination: Anglican
- Parents: Robert F. Gibson & Harriet McKenney
- Spouse: Alison Gibson
- Children: 4

Robert Fisher Gibson Jr. (November 22, 1906 - September 21, 1990) was the tenth bishop of Virginia in The Episcopal Church.

== Early life and education ==
Gibson graduated from the Virginia Theological Seminary and University of the South in Sewanee, Tennessee, at both of which he later taught.

== Ministry ==
Gibson was ordained a deacon in June 1940 by Presiding Bishop Henry St. George Tucker and as a priest 6 months later by Bishop Frederick D. Goodwin. He served in two parishes and traveled to Mexico for missionary work. After that he embarked on the commencement of his academic career of teaching church history at Virginia Theological Seminary and later as dean of at Sewanee, The University of the South.

Gibson was consecrated as Suffragan bishop of the Diocese of Virginia in 1949 and in 1954 the diocesan convention elected him as Coadjutor bishop of Virginia. In 1961 he became the diocesan bishop. In addition to his diocesan duties, including support for the ordination of women as priests, Bishop Gibson was an outspoken supporter of ecumenism, and served as chairman of the Consultation on Church Union (COCU) in the 1960s, although their plan to merge eight major Protestant denominations into a 24-million-member church was never consummated. He also served as vice president of the House of Bishops.

He retired as diocesan bishop in 1974, having called for a bishop coadjutor in 1966. That coadjutor, Robert Bruce Hall, succeeded him as the diocese's 11th bishop. One of his suffragan bishops, Philip Alan Smith was elected coadjutor of the Episcopal Diocese of New Hampshire, and would become that diocese's seventh bishop. He remained active in church matters until his death, of a heart attack, in Richmond.
