= Frederick D. Goodwin =

Bishop of the Episcopal Diocese of Virginia

The Right Reverend Frederick D. Goodwin D.D., LL.D.
- Bishop of Virginia
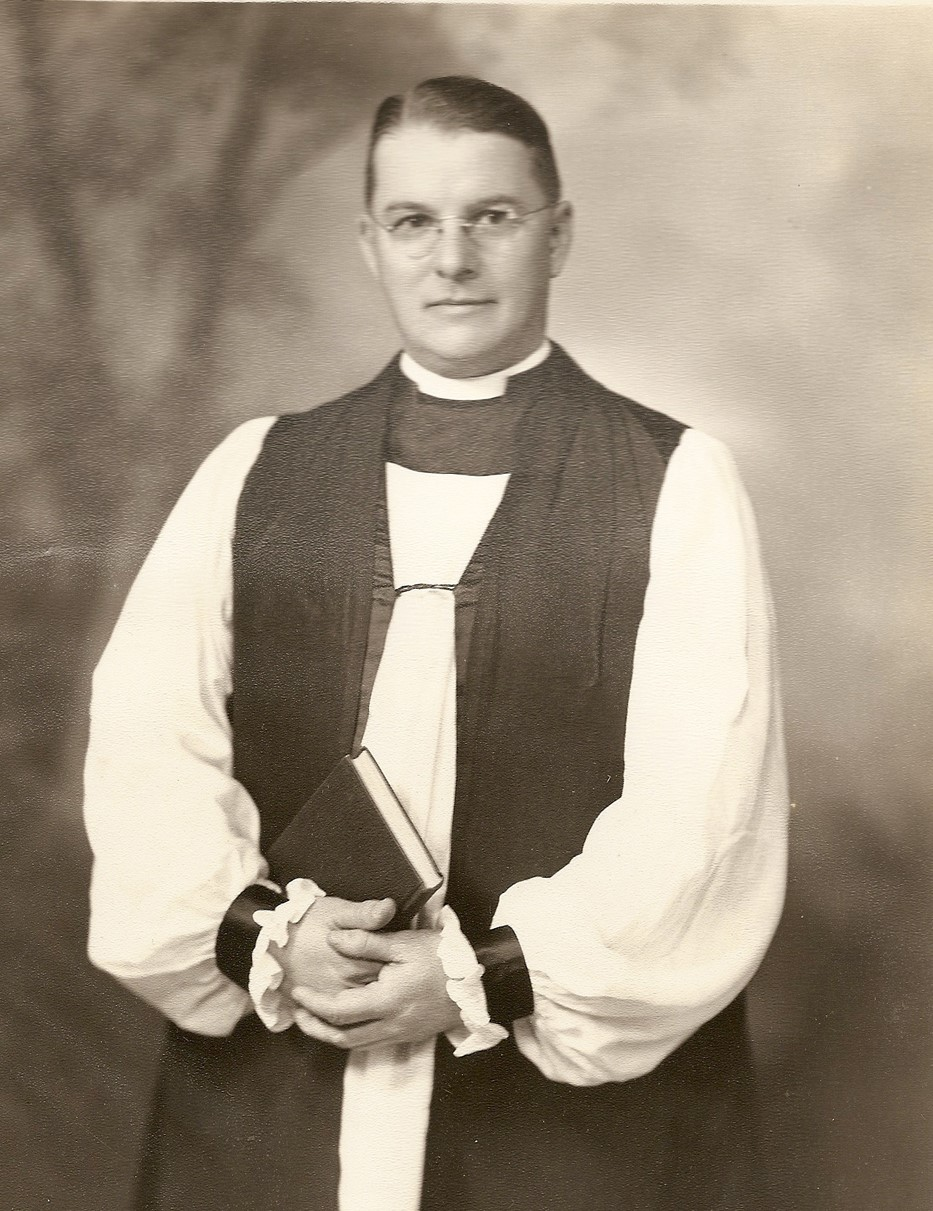
- Church: Episcopal Church
- Diocese: Virginia
- In office: 1944–1960
- Predecessor: Henry St. George Tucker
- Successor: Robert F. Gibson Jr.
- Previous post: Coadjutor Bishop of Virginia (1930–1944)

Orders
- Ordination: June 1918 by Robert Atkinson Gibson
- Consecration: October 16, 1930 by Henry St. George Tucker

Personal details
- Born: November 5, 1888 Cismont, Virginia, United States
- Died: January 13, 1968 (aged 79) Wheeling, West Virginia, United States
- Buried: Yeocomico Church
- Denomination: Anglican
- Parents: Edward Lewis Goodwin & Maria Love Smith
- Spouse: Blanche Elbert Moncure (m. October 6, 1917)
- Children: 3

Frederick Deane Goodwin (November 5, 1888 – January 13, 1968) was bishop of the Episcopal Diocese of Virginia, United States, serving from 1944 to 1960. He served as coadjutor from 1930 to 1944.

== Biography ==
Goodwin was born on November 5, 1888, in Cismont, Virginia. He attended the Episcopal High School in Alexandria, Virginia, The College of William and Mary, and the Virginia Theological Seminary, from where he graduated in 1917. During the same year he was ordained deacon. Prior to his election as coadjutor bishop of Virginia, he served as rector of Cople, Lunenburg and North Farnham in Virginia.

On May 22, 1930, he was elected coadjutor Bishop of Virginia. He was elected on the first ballot at the 135th annual council of the diocese. He was consecrated bishop on October 16, 1930, by Henry St. George Tucker, Bishop of Virginia and future Presiding Bishop. He succeeded as diocesan bishop on January 1, 1944, upon the resignation of Bishop Tucker. He served in that post until 1960 when he reached the mandatory age of retirement. He died on January 13, 1968, in Wheeling, West Virginia after a long illness.

Goodwin was married to Blanche, who died in 1955; they had three children.
