= Arthur Selden Lloyd =

American coadjutor bishop

The Right Reverend Arthur Selden Lloyd
- Suffragan Bishop of New York
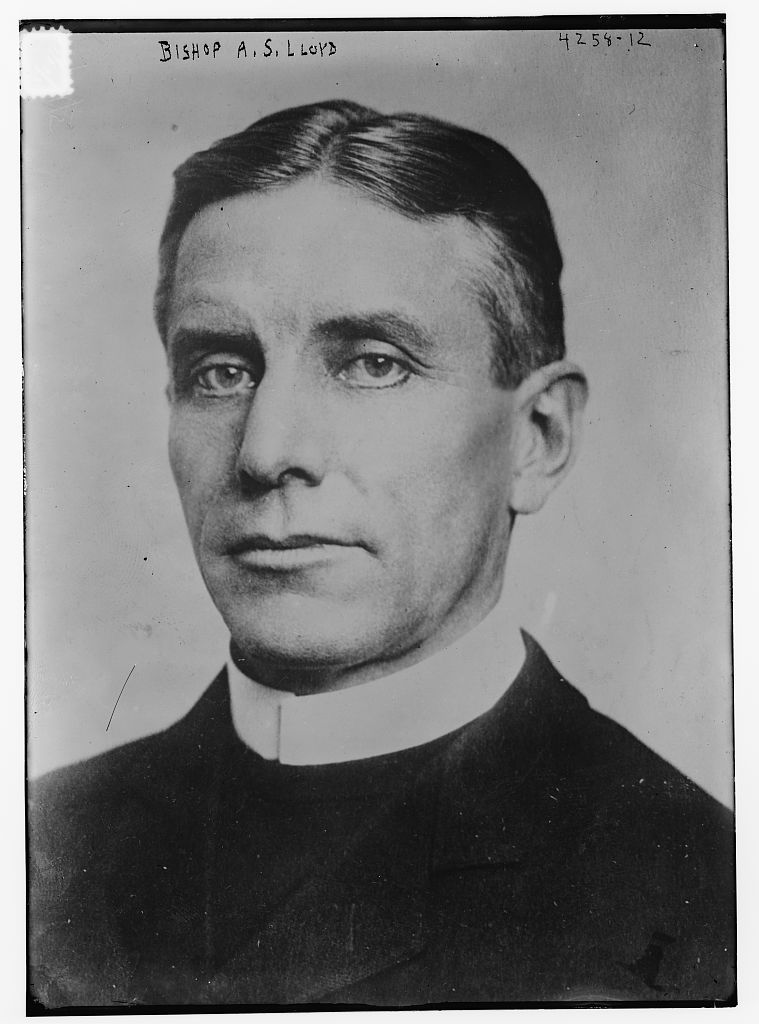
- Church: Episcopal Church
- Diocese: New York
- Elected: May 12, 1921
- In office: 1921–1936
- Previous post: Coadjutor Bishop of Virginia (1909-1910)

Orders
- Ordination: June 24, 1881 by Francis McNeece Whittle
- Consecration: October 20, 1909 by Daniel S. Tuttle

Personal details
- Born: May 3, 1857 Mount Ida, Virginia, United States
- Died: July 22, 1936 (aged 79) Darien, Connecticut, United States
- Buried: Ivy Hill Cemetery (Alexandria, Virginia)
- Denomination: Anglican
- Parents: John Janney Lloyd; Eliza Armistead Selden
- Spouse: Elizabeth Robertson Blackford (m. 1880)
- Education: Virginia Polytechnic Institute; University of Virginia; Virginia Theological Seminary

Arthur Selden Lloyd (May 3, 1857 – July 22, 1936) was president of the Board of Missions of the Episcopal Church. He was the coadjutor bishop for the Episcopal Diocese of Virginia from 1909 to 1911 and then Suffragan Bishop of New York from 1921 until 1936.

== Biography ==
He was born in Mount Ida, Virginia on May 3, 1857, to John Janney Lloyd and Eliza Armistead Selden.

He was educated at the Virginia Polytechnic Institute, the University of Virginia, the Virginia Theological Seminary with a D.D., and later he attended Roanoke College. He entered the ministry of the Episcopal Church and was ordained deacon on June 25, 1880, and priest on June 24, 1881. He then served as a missionary in Prince Edward County, Virginia till 1885. Between 1885 and 1899, he was rector of St Luke's Church in Norfolk, Virginia. From 1900 until 1909 he was general secretary of the Domestic and Foreign Missionary Society. He married Elizabeth Robertson Blackford on June 30, 1880.

Lloyd was elected to numerous bishoprics which he declined, notably Bishop of Mississippi in 1903, Bishop of Kentucky in 1904, Bishop Coadjutor of Southern Virginia in 1905 and Coadjutor Bishop of Maryland in 1908. However, in the summer of 1909 he was elected Coadjutor Bishop of Virginia, which he accepted. He was consecrated on October 20, 1909, in Christ Church (Alexandria, Virginia) by Presiding Bishop Daniel S. Tuttle. He resigned his bishopric in 1910 and went back to the Church Missions House where he had served prior to his election. He was selected as its president and re-elected in 1916. When the missionary society was revamped in 1919, the presidency held by Bishop Lloyd was abolished and he became rector of St Bartholomew's Church in White Plains, New York. On May 12, 1921, he was elected Suffragan Bishop of New York, a post he retained till his death.

His wife died in 1932. He died on July 22, 1936, in Darien, Connecticut.
