= Shannon Johnston =

American bishop

The Right Reverend Shannon Sherwood Johnston D.D.
- Bishop of Virginia
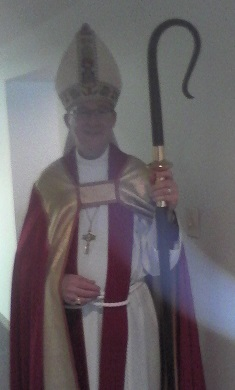
- Church: Episcopal Church
- Diocese: Virginia
- In office: 2009–2018
- Predecessor: Peter James Lee
- Previous post: Coadjutor Bishop of Virginia (2007–2009)

Orders
- Ordination: December 14, 1988
- Consecration: May 26, 2007 by Katharine Jefferts Schori

Personal details
- Born: October 20, 1958 (age 67) Florence, Alabama, United States
- Denomination: Anglican
- Spouse: Ellen Johnston (m. May 20, 1995)

Shannon Sherwood Johnston (born October 20, 1958) is a bishop of The Episcopal Church who was the 13th bishop of the Episcopal Diocese of Virginia.

== Early life ==
Born in Florence, Alabama, Shannon Johnston attended local public schools and then the University of the South in Sewanee, Tennessee, from which he graduated in 1981 with a bachelor's degree in philosophy and music. He then led programs for young people at the University of North Alabama and with the Boys' Club of Brunswick, Georgia. Johnston then matriculated at the Seabury-Western Theological Seminary in Evanston, Illinois, where his studies included two terms at Westcott House Theological College at Cambridge University in England, and ultimately led to him receiving his Masters of Divinity degree in 1988.

== Ministry ==
Ordained a deacon on June 11, 1988, Johnston moved to Selma, Alabama, to serve as curate of St. Paul's Church, and was ordained priest on December 14 of that year. In 1990, he accepted a call as rector of Church of the Advent in Sumner, Mississippi, where he also began a prison ministry with the nearby Parchman State Penitentiary. In 1994, he became rector of All Saints’ Church in Tupelo, Mississippi, where he served for 13 years. His outreach work received national recognition, and he also held various leadership posts in the Episcopal Diocese of Mississippi, including nine years as dean and two terms as president of the Standing Committee.

In 2007, the Diocese of Virginia elected Johnston to be coadjutor bishop to Bishop Peter James Lee, who was nearing retirement. He was consecrated at Washington National Cathedral on May 26, 2007, by Presiding Bishop Katharine Jefferts Schori, Bishop Lee and his suffragan David Colin Jones, as well as Bishops Duncan M. Gray III of Mississippi, J. Neil Alexander of Atlanta and Wendell L. Gibbs of Michigan. Johnston then succeeded Bishop Lee upon his retirement in 2009.

After judicial resolution of the long litigation concerning the attempts of certain conservative churches in Virginia to withdraw from the Diocese and associate with an African diocese with similar opposition to same-sex marriages, Bishop Johnston drew nationwide attention for his peacemaking with the pastor of one of the dissident congregations. Four months later, he issued a letter to clergy in his diocese concerning the divisive issue, last addressed by the General Convention in 2012 and more recently by Virginia's courts and attorney general. He resigned as diocesan bishop of Virginia in November 2018.

Johnston has received honorary degrees from the Seabury-Western Theological Seminary, as well as from the Virginia Theological Seminary.

== Personal information ==
Bishop Johnston married his wife Ellen Johnston, a professional church musician and clinician whom he met at a diocesan conference in Mississippi, on May 20, 1995.

== See also ==
- List of Episcopal bishops of the United States
- Historical list of the Episcopal bishops of the United States

Episcopal Church (USA) titles
Preceded by Peter James Lee	Bishop of Virginia	Succeeded by The Rt. Rev. Susan Goff, Bishop Suffragan and Ecclesiastical Authority
