= John Johns =

American Episcopal bishop (1796–1876)

The Right Reverend John Johns
- Bishop of Virginia
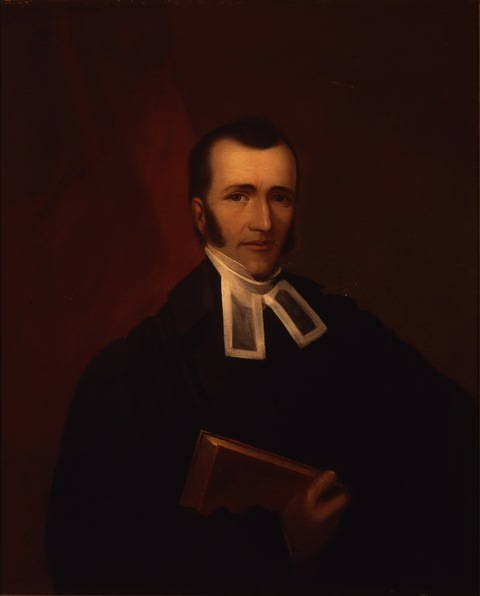
- Church: Episcopal Church
- See: Virginia
- In office: 1862–1876
- Predecessor: William Meade
- Successor: Francis McNeece Whittle
- Previous post: Assistant Bishop of Virginia (1842–1862)

Orders
- Ordination: July 26, 1820 by James Kemp
- Consecration: October 13, 1842 by Alexander Viets Griswold

Personal details
- Born: July 10, 1796 New Castle, Delaware, United States
- Died: April 5, 1876 (aged 79) Alexandria, Virginia, United States
- Buried: Virginia Theological Seminary
- Denomination: Anglican

John Johns

15th President of the College of William & Mary
- In office 1849–1854
- Preceded by: Robert Saunders, Jr.
- Succeeded by: Benjamin Stoddert Ewell

John Johns (July 10, 1796 – April 5, 1876) was the fourth Episcopal bishop of Virginia. He led his diocese into secession during the American Civil War and later tried to heal it through the Reconstruction Era. Johns also served as President of the College of William and Mary in Williamsburg before that war, and led and taught at the Virginia Theological Seminary in Alexandria after the war.

== Biography ==
=== Early life and education ===
Born into a prominent political family in New Castle, Delaware, in 1796, John Johns was the son of Chief Justice Kensey Johns. His mother, Ann Van Dyke, was the daughter of Governor Nicholas Van Dyke of Delaware. However, young John Johns was raised at the family's estate in Maryland, the Cliffs in Calvert County, established by his emigrant Quaker ancestor in 1660.

In 1815, Johns graduated from Princeton College in New Jersey and from Princeton Theological Seminary in 1819. On November 20, 1820, he married the first of his three wives, Julianna Jackson, also of Calvert County, and who moved west with her new husband to Frederick County.

=== Ministry ===
Bishop William White ordained Johns to the deaconate of the Episcopal Church in 1819 in Philadelphia. In 1820, Maryland's Bishop James Kemp ordained Johns, then age 23, to the priesthood. He served at All Saints Church in Frederick, Maryland for the next eight years.

In Frederick, the scholarly Johns honed his preaching and pastoral skills. Then, despite being offered a significant pay raise to remain in Frederick, he accepted a call to Christ Church in Baltimore on July 21, 1828. His successor in Frederick was his brother Henry Van Dyke Johns, who was ordained deacon by bishop White in 1826, and who about three years later became the first rector of (now-demolished) Trinity Episcopal Church in Washington, D.C. and later Emmanuel Church in Baltimore.

Rev. Johns became known as a scholar, as well as for his active evangelism, which was strongly Calvinistic (their father's family was a mix of Presbyterians and Episcopalians). He preached "a direct personal approach to Him, whose language is 'Come unto me'" and criticized Tractarians for exalting "the priest at the expense of the Saviour." He attended many meetings of the Board of Missions of the Protestant Episcopal Church, and also in 1840 delivered a lecture to the American Whig and Cliosophic Societies of his alma mater.

Fellow Maryland Episcopalians twice nominated Rev. John Johns to become their Bishop of Maryland, but never achieved the requisite 2/3 majority—the conventions deadlocked over issues including high church/low church and slavery. He was first passed over at the age of 32, when the electors deadlocked upon the successor to Bishop Kemp, who died unexpectedly young in 1827, and which prompted Johns to accept the rectorship at (later demolished) Christ Church, Baltimore, nearer the high church candidate Dr. William E. Wyatt of Baltimore's St. Paul's Church. However the next year Rev. Johns lost to compromise candidate Rev. William Murray Stone, from an established family on Maryland's Eastern Shore. When bishop Stone died in 1838, Johns was again the candidate of the low church party and Wyatt the high church candidate. Rather than again split the diocese, both Johns and Wyatt united to nominate (future Pennsylvania bishop) Dr. Alonzo Potter, but the ballots again favored Johns, but still not by the necessary supermajority. The next compromise candidate, Dr. Manton Eastburn of Massachusetts declined the election, as did missionary bishop Jackson Kemper. Two years later, in 1840, William Rollinson Whittingham was elected Maryland's bishop.

Meanwhile, in 1823, Rev. Johns invited Rev. William Meade, who lived not far across the Potomac River in Virginia, as a guest preacher at All Saints. That year, Rev. Meade (a dedicated evangelist and low churchman like Johns) had helped found new Virginia Theological Seminary (VTS), along with Francis Scott Key and others. In 1825 Rev. Johns was first elected a manager (trustee) of VTS, along with Meade, Key and others. He was elected Fourth Vice President of the institution in 1826, 1827 and 1831, then First Vice President in 1842. Meade had become assistant bishop to Bishop Richard Channing Moore of Virginia in 1829, and in 1842 asked Johns to become his assistant bishop when he succeeded Rt. Rev. Moore upon the latter's death.

=== Consecration and Ministry under Bishop Meade ===
In 1842, John Johns was consecrated bishop and named Assistant Bishop of Virginia by its newly elected Bishop, William Meade, who had requested an assistant to avoid the long interregnums after the deaths of his two predecessors, as well as handle episcopal duties in the vast diocese (which then included the entire state). Rt.Rev. Johns thus became the first bishop consecrated in the Commonwealth of Virginia. His consecrators included Bishops Alexander Viets Griswold (V Presiding Bishop as well as bishop of the Eastern Diocese), William Meade (third bishop of Virginia), and Levi Ives (second bishop of North Carolina), who delivered the consecratory sermon.

Like Bishop Meade, John Johns famously rode "circuit" throughout his diocese of nearly 70,000 square miles (180,000 km^{2}). Their efforts led to revitalization of the formerly established church in the Commonwealth, which had for several years previously failed to send even a delegate to the Episcopal Church's General Conventions. For example, Cameron Parish had split off Shelbourne Parish (St. James Church, Leesburg, Virginia) around the time of the American Revolutionary War, and in 1840 split off Meade Parish in Upperville, Virginia, leading Bishop Johns to consecrate Emmanuel Church on July 21, 1842, and the new church managed to reutilize some bricks and other elements from the ruins of two churches in southern Virginia—Old Lower Southwark Church in Surry County (Lawne's Creek Parish) and Newport Parish Church in Isle of Wight County. In 1850, the area around Aldie continued to grow, so a new parish was attached to Meade in 1850, which split off into Emmanuel Episcopal Church, Middleburg, Virginia (Johns Parish) in 1852. In 1853, Bishop Johns confirmed Robert E. Lee in the Episcopal Church. Shortly before the Civil War, the church reached almost 8,000 communicants.

=== Presidency at the College of William and Mary ===
From 1849 until 1854, in addition to his episcopal duties, Johns served as the fifteenth president of the College of William and Mary in Williamsburg, Virginia. In 1849, the finances of the college had been improved somewhat, but remained in a state of upheaval over national and college politics. "[A]fter the death of President Dew (1846), the College experienced such a terrible conflict caused by a student delivering . . . a challenge to a duel over a row growing out of some bitterness over a faculty election, that at first the student was dismissed, and then, the whole faculty was 'fired' and 'the students left because there were no classes.'" For almost a year and a half prior to Bishop Johns' selection, the college had been closed with the exception of one professor giving instructing students at his home.

According to Bishop Meade, the college in 1845 "by arrangement with the Episcopal Church of Virginia, . . . secured the services of Bishop Johns of Virginia. During the five years of his continuance. . . he so diligently and wisely conducted the management of the College as to produce a regular increase of the number of students until they had nearly reached the maximum of former years, established a better discipline than perhaps ever before had prevailed." During this time, Johns refused all remuneration for his collegiate position.

=== Bishop of Virginia ===
Shortly before the American Civil War, 1861–1865, Bishop Meade announced his retirement and after Bishop Meade's death in March, 1862, a diocesan convention formally elected Rt.Rev. Johns as Virginia's fourth bishop. The diocese then included the entire (seceded) state, although proposals to split off portions had been made for during the previous two decades, and ultimately led to creation of the dioceses of West Virginia (1877), Southern Virginia (1892), and Southwestern Virginia (1919).

After Virginia seceded, Bishop Johns became active in the Episcopal Church in the Confederate States of America. He participated in the only consecration by bishops in that church, of Richard Hooker Wilmer to the Diocese of Alabama, held on March 6, 1862, in Richmond. The Confederate Bishops' first pastoral letter declared that slaves were "a sacred trust."

Bishop Johns spent many long weeks riding through the battlefields and visiting the soldiers in camp—baptizing, confirming, and preaching. At the age of 70, Bishop Johns rode like a raider—with the great personal risk of his life—to reach the battlefields' wounded and dying. Bishop Johns regularly preached at Richmond's Libby Prison during the War . . . "with special reference to those inmates who had been commended to [his] attention by their friends in the North." Historians speculate as to whether or not Bishop Johns baptized and confirmed Confederate President Jefferson Davis.

Meanwhile, many close to Bishop Johns or Bishop Meade led resistance to Union forces. His nephew, Rev. Kensey Johns Stewart, refused to mention the President of the United States when delivering Morning Prayer at St. Paul's Church in Alexandria, for which he was seized in the chancel and led off to prison in his vestments. In Norfolk, Rev. J.H.D. Wingfield (later Bishop of Northern California) was arrested, his property confiscated and he was sentenced without trial to three months hard labor as a street sweeper in Norfolk for refusing to take the oath of allegiance, which he only made after Union General Benjamin Butler supposedly threatened to expel his wife and children from Union-occupied territory without money, food or additional clothing.

Churches desecrated (used as stables because of their box pews) included Abington in Gloucester County, Aquia Church in Prince William County, Lamb's Creek in King George County and St. Peter's Episcopal Church in New Kent County.

=== Postwar years ===
After General Lee surrendered at Appomattox Court House, Bishop Johns issued a pastoral letter advising "prompt and honest obedience to the existing government" and the use of the old prayer for the President of the United States. He also declined an offer from the national church's Domestic and Foreign Missionary Society to pay salaries to him and his impoverished clergy, saying they all preferred to suffer the same privations as their people. In September, 1865, he recommended that the diocescan Council agree to rejoin the Episcopal Church, but they declined. He tried again in 1866, and after two days of debate, the Council agreed, provided it could retain its annual Confederate practice of holding "Councils" rather than "Conventions." Other Southern dioceses followed suit. Reportedly, when his fellow bishops congratulated him upon the return of the Southern dioceses, Johns said he felt like Lazarus, elaborating "licked by dogs, ... licked by dogs."

By 1866, Virginia Theological Seminary in Alexandria was left "wasted and impoverished by war". All the funds of the seminary in Virginia bank stocks were completely destroyed in the war. After the war, Bishop Johns became president and also professor of pastoral theology at the Seminary and with some funds bequeathed by his cousin, he began rebuilding the seminary.

In 1867, the diocesan Council could not agree upon further division of the diocese, West Virginia having split off as a state as well as diocese during the Civil War. However, it deed agree to appoint Rev. Francis McNeece Whittle, of the first graduating class at Alexandria's Episcopal High School, as bishop Johns' assistant as he had been Bishop Meade's. Also, a Standing Committee on Colored Populations was created, and recently freed slaves, and other African Americans were permitted to elect their own vestries, wardens and ministers if they wished to form separate congregations. Rt.Rev. Whittle led the committee, and fostered the vocation of Rev. James Solomon Russell.

Bishop Johns was twice named the "savior" of the church in Virginia. According to Rev. Dr. G. MacLaren Brydon, D.D., Historiographer of the Diocese of Virginia, in 1957 wrote that Bishop Johns "was enabled upon two different occasions to save the Episcopal Church and the Diocese of Virginia from great calamity." First, he brought the diocese of war-wrecked Virginia "back into the fellowship of the Protestant Episcopal Church in the United States," and second, "was in the years 1873-75 at the time when the . . . radical element [formed] a Reformed Episcopal Church, [B]ecause of his influence the majority of the clergy and people would go with him . . . . John Johns stood firm as a rock . . . [and in Virginia] the movement stopped right there. . . [T]he stand taken by Bishop Johns had saved the Church."

In 1872, as the diocese began to recover economically, Rt. Rev. Johns became concerned about the growing High Church movement, and particularly about using altars in remodeled churches rather than the "honest table .. on which, not a sacrifice is to be offered, but the Lord's Supper administered." He also listed "Romish errors" to be avoided, including use of incense, crucifix, candles, processional crosses, bowing and genuflections, permitting laymen to assist in Holy Communion, mixing water and wine, elevation of bread and wine, use of wafer bread, and the wearing of any vestments other than a black cassock, gown, bands and white surplice with black or white stole."

Nonetheless, when an ultra-evangelical party tried to create the Reformed Episcopal Church in 1875, Bishops Johns and Whittle kept the Virginia Church in the General Convention, and only three clergymen from the diocese left with Kentucky's assistant Bishop George D. Cummins (and fellow former Delawarean).

== Death and legacy ==
After serving as a bishop for 34 years, Bishop Johns died in 1876 at his home, Malvern, next to VTS. He reportedly whispered as his dying words, "guide me—wash me—clothe me—help me under the shadow of Thy wings." Bishop Johns was interred in the newly established cemetery of the Virginia Theological Seminary in Alexandria.

He had married three times and willed most of his property to his two sons. One son, by his second wife, Dr. Arthur Schaaf Johns, also became an Episcopal priest and rector in Rockville, Maryland. The other son, Dr. Kensey Johns (1825-1909) of Norfolk, Virginia, inherited the ancestral estate, Sudley, on the Delmarva Peninsula. His daughter by his first wife (and named after her), Julianna Johns (1822-1883), never married but remained active in Episcopal Church affairs until her death six years later. She founded the Alexandria Infirmary in 1882, which became Alexandria Hospital (now part of the Inova Health System, which erected a plaque in her memory near her and her father's graves).

Johns Memorial Episcopal Church, located in Farmville, Virginia and now in the Diocese of Southern Virginia, stands today as a living memorial to Bishop John Johns's ministry, although it also featured later in the Massive Resistance movement of the 1950s. Furthermore, as mentioned earlier, Johns Parish in Middleburg and Aldie, Virginia is named after this bishop. Farmville, like the Middleburg/Aldie area and Frederick, Maryland (as well as Gettysburg, Pennsylvania) are all near the same historic north–south route in the mid-Atlantic's Piedmont region that became U.S. Route 15. His ancestral home near Chesapeake Bay, Sudley, was listed on the National Register of Historic Places in 1973.

Episcopal Church (USA) titles
Preceded by William Meade	Bishop of Virginia; 1862–1876	Succeeded by Francis McNeece Whittle
