= Blue Ridge School =

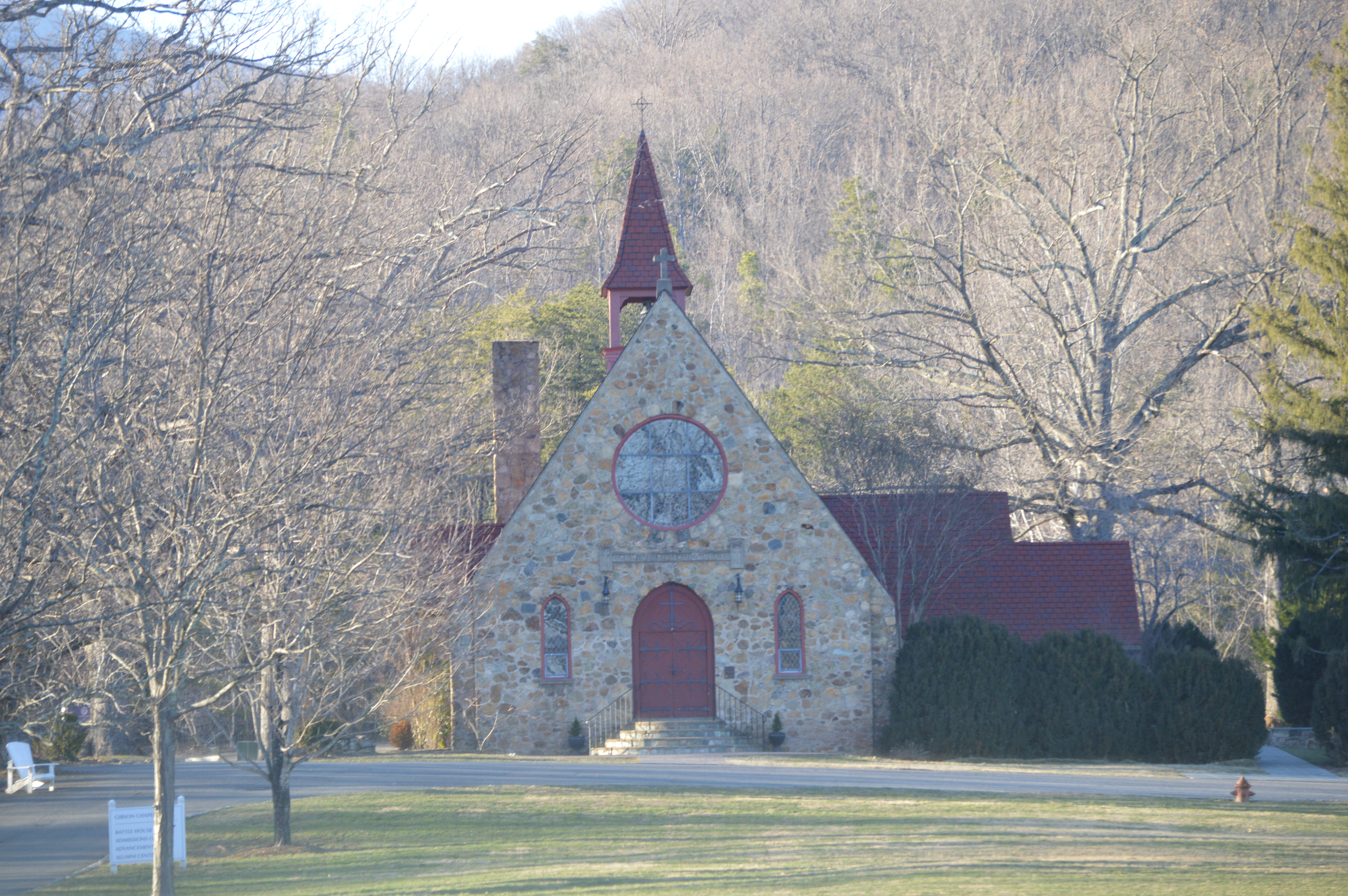
- Gibson Memorial Chapel

Location
- 273 Mayo Dr; Saint George, Greene County, Virginia 22935-1370; United States
- 38°15′54.5″N 78°33′18.8″W

Information
- Former name: The Blue Ridge Industrial School
- Type: Independent college-preparatory boarding high school
- Motto: Teaching Boys To Reach
- Religious affiliation: Nonsectarian
- Established: 1909; 117 years ago
- Founder: George P. Mayo
- Status: Currently operational
- CEEB code: 472020
- NCES School ID: 01434842
- Head of school: William A. "Trip" Darrin
- Faculty: 33.3 (on an FTE basis)
- Grades: 9–12
- Gender: All-boys
- Enrollment: 158 (2021-2022)
  - Grade 9: 16
  - Grade 10: 29
  - Grade 11: 64
  - Grade 12: 49
- Student to teacher ratio: 4.7:1
- Hours in school day: 6.5
- Campus size: 751 acres (304 ha)
- Campus type: Distant rural
- Colors: Blue & White
- Nickname: Barons
- Endowment: $19.9 million (2019)
- Annual tuition: $62,500
- Revenue: $13.5 million (2019)
- Affiliations: NAIS, TABS
- Website: blueridgeschool.com

Blue Ridge School (formerly The Blue Ridge Industrial School) is an independent, all-male boarding school for students grades 9-12 located in the foothills of the Blue Ridge Mountains in Saint George, Virginia, United States. Approximately 185 students attend Blue Ridge from 27 states and 15 foreign countries, with many from Virginia and other Southeastern and Mid-Atlantic states. The school's campus is 751 acres (3 km^{2}) in Greene County, Virginia, adjoining Brokenback Mountain at the edge of Shenandoah National Park in the Appalachian Mountains. The headmaster is William "Trip" Darrin, since 2012.

== History ==
The school was originally founded in 1909 by The Rev. George P. Mayo, an Episcopal clergyman, as the Blue Ridge Industrial School, a school for the rural mountain students in the region. The school opened in January 1910 as a coeducational vocational school with about 35 students; two students graduated at the first commencement in 1918. Enrollment rose to 112 in 1922 and 165 in 1928. The first building was Neve Hall; the school lost buildings to fires in 1911, 1918, and 1962, when the first infirmary was destroyed and was hit by a tornado on September 30, 1959. Mayo served as Superintendent until 1944. It closed in 1960.

Blue Ridge became a college preparatory school for boys in 1962, with a short-term reduction of the student body to 66.

== Curriculum ==
Blue Ridge School uses project-based learning principles developed by PBLWorks to create a learning environment well-suited for boys. In 2018, the school introduced an entrepreneurship program that put students through the process of conceiving a product, developing a business plan, and pitching the product to a panel of judges. The following year, this program became a series of entrepreneurism classes.

The Fishburne Learning Center provides individualized learning skills development for approximately 25% of the students. Learning Center classes occur during the school day, and each class has two to three students.

== Extracurricular activities ==
=== Athletics ===
Blue Ridge School offers many sports and participates in the fall, winter, and spring seasons. As of April 2020, the school has 26 athletic teams. It participates in the Blue Ridge Athletic Conference (BRAC) and the Virginia Independent Schools Athletic Association (VISAA). Its football team won state championships in 1994, 2012, and 2016. Its basketball program won state championships in 2015, 2017, 2019, 2020, 2021, and 2022 and has produced many Division-1 NCAA players. In the 2016-17 sports year, their football and basketball teams won a VA state championship. It has a 22,000 square foot (2,000 m^{2}) indoor field house; its facilities include Massey Gymnasium, indoor tennis and basketball courts, an exercise and weight-lifting facility, wrestling-room, and batting cages. Blue Ridge's athletics teams include:

==== Fall ====
- V Cross-Country
- JV Cross-Country
- JV Football
- JV Soccer
- Mountain Biking
- V Football
- V Soccer
- Outdoor Adventure Sports

==== Winter ====
- Indoor Soccer
- JV Basketball
- Outdoor Sports
- Varsity B Basketball
- Varsity Basketball
- Wrestling

==== Spring ====
- Outdoor Adventure Sports
- Baseball
- Golf
- V Lacrosse
- JV Lacrosse
- V Tennis
- JV Tennis
- Track & Field

Beginning in the mid-1990s, Blue Ridge developed a well-regarded basketball program, with players including LaRon Campbell-Hall, Jermaine Harper, Brandon Freeman, Luke Minor, Tom Timmermans from the Netherlands, and Andrey Savtchenko from Russia, and won a state title. Recent NCAA standouts from Blue Ridge School include Aamir Simms and Mamadi Diakite.

=== Outdoor program ===
Blue Ridge School has an outdoor program involving mountain biking, archery, fishing, and hiking, among other activities. Students are also taught wilderness survival skills. It has 18 miles of mountain biking and hiking trails on campus.

== Campus ==
The original 148 acre (0.6 km^{2}) campus, located 20 miles (32 km) from Charlottesville, Virginia, sits at the foothills of the Blue Ridge Mountains. The campus has grown to nearly 750 acres (3.2 km^{2}) and includes a lake and several ponds. The Robert A. Gibson Memorial Chapel, the Martha Bagby Battle House (former Headmaster's Residence), and the old St. George Post Office still stand on the school's grounds. The Gibson Memorial Chapel, designed by architect Ralph Adams Cram and built in 1929–1932, and the Martha Bagby Battle House were listed on the National Register of Historic Places in 1993.

== Notable alumni ==
- Laurynas Mikalauskas (2004), basketball player who plays overseas
- Paris Maragkos (2012), basketball player who plays overseas
- Mamadi Diakite (2015), NBA player
- Aamir Simms (2017), basketball player who plays overseas
- Darius McGhee (2018), basketball player who plays overseas
- Maliq Brown (2022), basketball player for the Duke Blue Devils

== Notable faculty ==
Amber Wilkins was named Dean of Faculty in 2021. Former Blue Ridge School Dean of the Faculty Pete Bonds was a recipient of the 2019 International Boys' Schools Coalition Action Research Award for his work with 12th-grade history students. Approximately 80% of faculty live on campus.
