= Francis McNeece Whittle =

Episcopal bishop of Virginia, United States (1823-1902)

The Right Reverend Francis McNeece Whittle D.D., LL.D.
- Bishop of Virginia
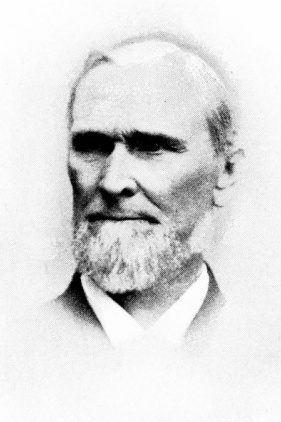
- Church: Episcopal Church
- See: Virginia
- In office: 1876–1902
- Predecessor: John Johns
- Successor: Robert Atkinson Gibson
- Previous post: Assistant Bishop of Virginia (1868-1876)

Orders
- Ordination: October 8, 1848 by William Meade
- Consecration: April 30, 1868 by John Johns

Personal details
- Born: July 7, 1823 Mecklenburg County, Virginia, United States
- Died: June 20, 1902 (aged 78) Richmond, Virginia, [United States
- Buried: Hollywood Cemetery (Richmond, Virginia)
- Denomination: Anglican
- Parents: Fortescue Whittle & Mary Ann Davies
- Spouse: Emily Cary Fairfax

Francis McNeece Whittle (July 7, 1823 – June 20, 1902) was the fifth Episcopal bishop of Virginia.

== Early and family life ==
Born at Millbank Plantation on the Meherrin River in Mecklenburg County, Virginia, Francis was the next-to-youngest of the nine sons of Irish immigrant Fortescue Whittle (1778-1858) and Mary Ann Davies (1788-1869) of Norfolk, Virginia, Francis Whittle attended the Episcopal High School in Alexandria, Virginia and after teaching for a while, entered and graduated from the Virginia Theological Seminary (VTS)in 1847.

The following year, on May 15, 1848, he married Emily Cary Fairfax, daughter of Wilson Cary Fairfax and Lucy A. Griffith. They had eight children, including three daughters and one son who predeceased their parents: Mary Anne at Petersburg, Virginia in 1862, Julia at her uncle's historic house Eldon in Pittsylvania County, Virginia (later known as the estate of Claude A. Swanson), Jane Eliza at Hopkinsville, Kentucky circa 1872 and Llewellyn Fairfax Whittle circa 1880. Surviving children included Lucy Tucker Whittle (b. 6 June 1849 in Charleston and who married John Nottingham Upshure of Norfolk, whose sole child Francis Whittle Upshure became a professor of medicine and pharmacology at the Medical College of Virginia), Francis McNeece Whittle Jr. (1856- ?), Emily Clary Whittle and Fortescue Whittle, II (1852-1918).

== Ministry ==
Bishop William Meade ordained Whittle as a deacon in St. Paul's Church in Alexandria, Virginia not long after his graduation from the seminary, and on October 8, 1848, ordained him as a Priest in St. John's Episcopal Church, Charleston, West Virginia. Whittle served in that parish another year, before being called to St. James Church, Wortham Parish in Goochland County, Virginia where he served from 1849 to 1852. Whittle then served in the Shenandoah Valley at Grace Church in Berryville, Virginia from 1857 to 1858. He then moved to Louisville, Kentucky, where he served at St. Paul's Church through the American Civil War, although his family returned to Virginia.

In 1867, Whittle received a theological degree from the Theological College of Ohio, and in 1873 a L.L.D. from the College of William and Mary.

== Episcopacy ==
Not long after the General Convention readmitted the Confederate bishops after the American Civil War, the clergy and laity of Virginia and West Virginia met in May 1867, and selected Whittle as Bishop John Johns' assistant. He was consecrated on April 30, 1868.

Recovery from the devastation of the war preoccupied Bishop Whittle's episcopate, both as Bishop Johns' assistant and as his successor beginning April 4, 1876. With the help of his wife Emily, Whittle established various charitable institutions in Richmond. In 1875, he established the Protestant Church Home, and remained on its board of directors until his death in 1902 (Emily Whittle was the Home's first President, serving for at least 10 years from 1877). Emily Whittle also established the first Richmond chapter of the Young Women's Christian Association.

The Diocese of Virginia split twice during Whittle's episcopate. The Diocese of West Virginia was created in 1877 to correspond to the new state created during the Civil War. The Diocese of Southern Virginia was created in 1892, with the understanding that a further division would soon occur (and the Diocese of Southwest Virginia was created after bishop Whittle's death). In 1897, Robert Atkinson Gibson was elected as bishop Whittle's Coadjutor with right of succession (the previous assistants having moved to the Diocese of Southern Virginia or died) and soon consecrated.

Although Bishop Whittle was known for his personal rectitude and lack of ostentation, by the end of his episcopate, Jim Crow laws had restricted the participation of African-American Episcopalians within the diocese, and African-American Virginians within the Commonwealth. While Bishop Whittle in 1878 had established the Bishop Payne Divinity School in Petersburg, Virginia to prepare African-Americans for ordination (which ultimately merged with VTS) and ordained George Freeman Bragg as deacon in 1887 and as priest the following year, in 1899 the diocesan council approved restricting Bragg's voice (and that of other non-white clergy) to the Convocation of the Missionary Jurisdiction.

Bishop Whittle also was active in sending missionaries to Brazil, and one of his last acts was signing a petition of clergymen opposing the Philippine–American War. However, he died disappointed that he had failed to stem the Oxford Movement within the Anglican Communion and within his diocese.

== Death and legacy ==
Bishop Whittle was buried at Hollywood Cemetery, as was his wife Emily.

His Greek Revival house in Richmond, 21 West Clay Street, lies in the Historic Jackson Ward neighborhood.

The University of North Carolina's Southern Historical Collection holds the Whittle family papers.

The "Little Georgetown" Church in The Plains, Virginia, built in 1887, was organized as Whittle Parish after a dispute with nearby Grace Church.

Episcopal Church (USA) titles
Preceded by John Johns	Bishop of Virginia; 1876–1902	Succeeded by Robert Atkinson Gibson
