= Episcopal Diocese of Virginia =

Episcopal Church diocese in the US

Coordinates: 38.503338°N 77.896835°W

Diocese of Virginia Diœcesis Virginiensis
- Coat of arms

Location
- Country: United States
- Ecclesiastical province: III
- Subdivisions: 16 Regions

Statistics
- Parishes: 173 (2024)
- Members: 68,000 (2024)

Information
- Denomination: Episcopal Church
- Established: May 18, 1785
- Cathedral: Cathedral Shrine of the Transfiguration (Shrine Mont)
- Language: English, Spanish

Current leadership
- Bishop: Bishop E. Mark Stevenson; Gayle E. Harris, Assistant Bishop; Mark Bourlakas, Assistant Bishop

Map
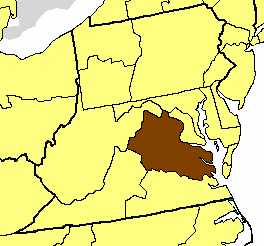
- Location of the Diocese of Virginia

Website
- episcopalvirginia.org

The Diocese of Virginia is the second largest diocese of the Episcopal Church in the United States of America, encompassing 38 counties in the northern and central parts of the U.S. state Virginia. The diocese was organized in 1785 and is one of the Episcopal Church's nine original dioceses, with origins in colonial Virginia. As of 2024, the diocese has 16 regions with more than 68,000 members and 173 congregations.

The see city is Richmond where the Diocesan Office is located. The diocese does not have a conventional cathedral church but rather an open-air cathedral, the Cathedral Shrine of the Transfiguration at Shrine Mont, which was consecrated in 1925. Shrine Mont in Orkney Springs, Virginia is also the site of a diocesan retreat and camp center. The diocese also operates the Virginia Diocesan Center at Roslyn in western Richmond, a conference center overlooking the James River. Virginia Theological Seminary, the largest accredited Episcopal seminary in the United States, is located within the diocese in Alexandria, Virginia.

== History ==
=== Church of England in Virginia ===
Anglicanism came to Virginia in 1607 with the settlers who founded Jamestown. The charter of the London Company instructed them to adhere to the practices of the Church of England, and between 1607 and its dissolution in 1624, the company sent 22 ministers to the colony. These ministers were not only concerned for the spiritual lives of the colonists but also attempted (largely unsuccessfully) to convert the Native Americans. When Virginia's General Assembly first met in 1619, it passed a series of laws concerning the church, including formally designating the Church of England as the established church of the colony. To keep pace with the colony's growth, the Burgesses ordered each settlement to set aside a house or room as a place to hold regular worship services.

After Virginia was made a royal colony in 1624, it would face an acute and serious clergy shortage until the end of the 17th century. The shortage was fueled by an expanding population and insufficient clergy recruitment despite efforts to attract ministers by offering incentives, such as tax breaks. This forced parishes to rely on lay readers to lead prayers and read published sermons. The absence of North American bishops necessitated that colonists desiring ordination make the dangerous trip to and from England. It also meant children could not be confirmed, which meant (prior to 1662) that they could not receive communion, although many clergymen overlooked this requirement.

In this vacuum, the legislature assumed some episcopal functions, such as outlining the responsibilities of clergymen and providing for their financial maintenance. It created a vestry system in 1642-1643 that was lay dominated, a radical departure from the English system where rectors were nominated by parish patrons and usually held office for life. In Virginia, vestries, usually consisting of 12 wealthy men, could appoint and remove ministers. Colonial parishes were units of local government and social welfare agencies. In addition to paying the minister's salary and building churches, the parish levy provided the vestry with funding for poor relief. Vestries were in charge of road maintenance, presented moral offenders to the county courts, and determined the legal bounds of an individual's land.

It was not until Henry Compton was appointed Bishop of London that the hierarchy of the English Church would address the problems in America. Compton not only worked to improve the quality of the colony's ministers but appointed commissaries to act on his behalf. Commissaries could "summon the clergy, conduct visitations, administer oaths customary in ecclesiastical courts, and administer discipline or judicial proceedings to wayward clergy either by admonition, suspension, or excommunication" but could not ordain to the priesthood. The first commissary, Henry Clayton, arrived in 1684 but left two years later. His successor, James Blair, held the office for 54 years, from 1689 to his death in 1743. Blair was successful in establishing parishes in every county. He was also committed to educating colonial men for the ministry, establishing the College of William and Mary in 1693. Compton's attention brought stability to Virginia's church and by 1703 nearly 80 percent of Virginia's 50 parishes had ministers.

Until the Great Awakening of the 1740s, the Church of England faced few challenges apart from small groups of Quakers. During the Awakening, however, Presbyterians and Baptists emerged as a threat to the religious establishment. Baptists especially resented the privileged status of the Anglican Church and laws requiring that the government license dissenting ministers. The Great Awakening also inspired an evangelical movement within the established church, much of which would eventually be absorbed by Methodism. By the 1750s and 1760s, however, the Church of England in Virginia was stable and prosperous.

=== Piety ===
In the 1740s the Anglican church had about 70 parish priests around the colony. There was no bishop, and indeed, there was fierce political opposition to having a bishop in the colony. The Anglican priests were supervised directly by the distant Bishop of London, who paid little attention. Each county court gave tax money to the local vestry, composed of prominent layman. The vestry provided the priest a glebe of 200 or 300 acres (1.2 km^{2}), a house, and perhaps some livestock. The vestry paid him an annual salary of 16,000 lb (7,300 kg). of tobacco, plus 20 shillings for every wedding and funeral. While not poor, the priests lived modestly and their opportunities for improvement were slim.

Ministers reported that the colonists were typically inattentive, uninterested, and bored during church services. According to the ministers' complaints, the people were sleeping, whispering, ogling the fashionably-dressed women, walking about and coming and going, or at best looking out the windows or staring blankly into space. By 1740, the acute shortage of clergy was easing, and by 1776, there were more Anglican clergy living in Virginia than there were parishes. Devout parishioners used the Book of Common Prayer for private prayer and devotion. This allowed devout Anglicans to lead an active and sincere religious life in addition to the formal church services. However the stress on private devotion weakened the need for a bishop or a large institutional church of the sort Blair wanted. The stress on personal piety opened the way for the First Great Awakening, which pulled people away from the established church.

=== Revolution ===
The American Revolution was a difficult time for the Anglican Church in America. Clergymen were divided between allegiance to their king and their state. As public officials, ministers were required to swear loyalty to the state, breaking the Oath of Supremacy in the process. Some were able to do this, but those who could not either resigned or withdrew from parish duties while continuing to provide pastoral care. There were calls for dis-establishment, but powerful church members resisted drastic change. In 1777, the legislature passed bills recognizing the church's right to its property and the right of the clergy to occupy the glebes. Clerical salaries were suspended and ended entirely in 1780. Thus for much of the war the Anglican Church faced an identity crisis. It was a state church controlled by a government refusing to fund it. The war also led to the breakdown of the vestry system as refugees strained parish resources and desperate vestrymen resigned or petitioned the state to dissolve their vestries.

=== Postwar Episcopalians ===
After the American Revolution, when freedom of religion and the separation of church and state became dominant ideas, the Church of England was dis-established in Virginia. A few ministers were Loyalists and had returned to England. When it began organizing as a diocese after the Revolution about 50 Episcopal clergy were still active in the state. The lack of a steady means of pay and natural aging continued to reduce the number of clergy. Reforms at the College of William and Mary resulted in no place for Episcopal clergy to study for ordination. The clergy shortage deepened over time. When possible, worship continued in the usual fashion, but the local vestry was no longer the unit of local government and no longer handled tax money. The Right Reverend James Madison (1749–1812) (a cousin of politician James Madison), was elected in 1790 as the first Episcopal Bishop of Virginia and slowly rebuilt the denomination.

After the war ended, Episcopalians (as Anglicans were now calling themselves) recognized the need to be in control of their own church. In April 1784, a meeting of Virginia ministers asked the legislature to relinquish control over the church and to issue an act of incorporation. In October, it passed an incorporation bill which placed the government of the Protestant Episcopal Church in the hands of an annual convention with both lay and clerical representatives. However, the state continued to create new parishes and set parish boundaries, oversee vestry elections, and require county courts to review parish finances for several more years. For its part, the Episcopal Church continued to hold a monopoly on performing marriages.

The first convention was held May 1785. It elected a standing committee, elected deputies to the first General Convention of the Episcopal Church in September, and created canons. The canons ensured that laity would participate in the trial of clergymen accused of misconduct and that bishops would have no authority except to oversee clerical conduct, perform confirmations and ordinations, and preside at the convention. At the second Virginia convention, in 1786, the Rev. David Griffith, who was both a surgeon and a priest, was elected to become the first Bishop of Virginia. He lacked the funds, however, to travel to England for his consecration, and in 1789, resigned his election, fell ill and died. The following year, James Madison, the president of the College of William and Mary, rector of James City parish, and cousin of the future president of the same name, was elected to become the first Bishop of Virginia, traveled to England and was consecrated.

In 1786, the Virginia Assembly passed the Virginia Statute for Religious Freedom, written by Thomas Jefferson and supported by James Madison. It also repealed the act of incorporation for the Virginia church and took from the vestries the oversight of poor relief. Baptists and Presbyterians were proposing that all property of the colonial parishes—glebes, church buildings, church yards, communion silver, and Bibles—be sold for the benefit of all Virginians. Even with a 1788 law confirming the Episcopal Church's rights to the colonial church's property and the repeal of all laws creating an established church in 1799, efforts to dis-endow the Episcopal Church continued. In 1801, the General Assembly passed a law authorizing county overseers of the poor to sell property of the former established church, using the money for education and the poor. As late as 1814, the General Assembly was still authorizing the sale of specific parishes' silver and bells, and in 1841, the Virginia Supreme Court of Appeals ruled in a case involving the seizure of a parish glebe.

After the Episcopal Church lost a challenge to the 1801 law, Bishop Madison focused on keeping the College of William and Mary going. Congestive heart failure made it difficult for Madison to travel, and the diocese suffered decline that lasted past Madison's death as once again the elected candidate declined the position.

The next Bishop, Richard Channing Moore led the rebuilding of the diocese. The opening of the Virginia Theological Seminary in Alexandria in 1823, under the guidance of William Holland Wilmer (who ultimately but briefly succeeded Madison as president of the College of William and Mary) and William Meade (who later succeeded Moore) provided the diocese with the source of clergy it needed to rebuild.

=== Civil War and aftermath ===
During the Civil War, West Virginia separated from Virginia and in 1877 that part of the Diocese of Virginia lying within the bounds of West Virginia became the Diocese of West Virginia. In 1892, The southern part of the diocese became the Diocese of Southern Virginia, and from that diocese, another emerged (the Diocese of Southwestern Virginia) in 1919. The boundaries of the Diocese of Virginia have remained unchanged since 1892.

=== Recent history ===
In recent decades, the diocese has experienced the effects of Anglican realignment as some conservative congregations withdrew from the diocese and the national Episcopal Church. Many of these congregations formed the Anglican Diocese of the Mid-Atlantic. In 2012, the diocese reclaimed legal access to Episcopal church properties that had been claimed by seven of the departing congregations, which included an unsuccessful appeal to the Supreme Court by Anglican members at The Falls Church.

== Bishops ==
These are the bishops who have served the Diocese of Virginia:

1. James Madison (1790–1812)
2. Richard Channing Moore (1814–1841)
  *William Meade, Assistant (1829–1841)
3. William Meade (1841–1862)
  *John Johns, Assistant (1842–1862)
4. John Johns (1862–1876)
  *Francis McNeece Whittle, Assistant (1867–1876)
5. Francis McNeece Whittle (1876–1902)
  *Alfred Magill Randolph, Assistant (1883–1892); named bishop of Southern Virginia
  *John Brockenbrough Newton, Assistant/Coadjutor (1894–1897)
  *Robert Atkinson Gibson, Coadjutor (1897–1902)
6. Robert Atkinson Gibson (1902–1919)
  *Arthur Selden Lloyd, Coadjutor, (1909 - 1911?)
  *William Cabell Brown, Coadjutor (1914–1919)
7. William Cabell Brown (1919–1927)
  *Henry St. George Tucker, Coadjutor (1926–1927)
8. Henry St. George Tucker (1927–1943), elected presiding bishop in 1938
  *Frederick D. Goodwin, Coadjutor (1930–1944)
9. Frederick D. Goodwin (1944–1960)
  *Wiley Roy Mason, suffragan (1942–1951), assistant (1951–1968)
  *Robert Fisher Gibson, Jr., suffragan (1949–1954), Coadjutor (1954–1960)
  *Samuel Blackwell Chilton, suffragan (1960–1969)
10. Robert Fisher Gibson, Jr. (1961–1974)
  *Robert Bruce Hall, Coadjutor (1966–1974)
  *Philip Alan Smith, suffragan (1970–1972), elected bishop coadjutor of New Hampshire
  *John Alfred Baden, suffragan (1973–1979)
11. Robert Bruce Hall (1974–1985)
  *David Henry Lewis, Jr., suffragan (1980–1987)
  *Peter James Lee, Coadjutor (1984–1985)
12. Peter James Lee (1985–2009)
  *Robert Poland Atkinson, Assistant (1989–1993)
  *F. Clayton Matthews, suffragan (1994–1998), named director of the Office of Pastoral Development
  *David Colin Jones, suffragan (1995-2012)
  *Francis Campbell Gray, Assistant (1999–2007)
  *Shannon Sherwood Johnston, Coadjutor (2007–2009)
13. Shannon Sherwood Johnston (2009-2018)
  *David Colin Jones, suffragan (1995-2012), subsequently visiting bishop (-2021-)
  *Edwin F. Gulick Jr., Assistant (2011-2017), subsequently visiting bishop (-2021-)
  *Susan E. Goff, suffragan (2012-2018), Ecclesiastical Authority (2018-2022)
  *Jennifer Brooke-Davidson, Assistant (2019-2022)
14. E. Mark Stevenson (2022-present) *Gayle E. Harris, Assistant (2023-present) *James Joseph Shand, Assisting (2024-present) *Shannon Sherwood Johnston, (Retired Bishop in Residence)
  *David Colin Jones, (Retired Bishop in Residence) *Susan E. Goff, (Retired Bishop in Residence)
  *Edwin F. Gulick Jr., (Retired Bishop in Residence)

== See also ==
- https://episcopalvirginia.org/who-we-are/history/
