= James Kemp (bishop) =

Scottish bishop

The Right Reverend James Kemp D.D., S.T.D.
- Bishop of Maryland
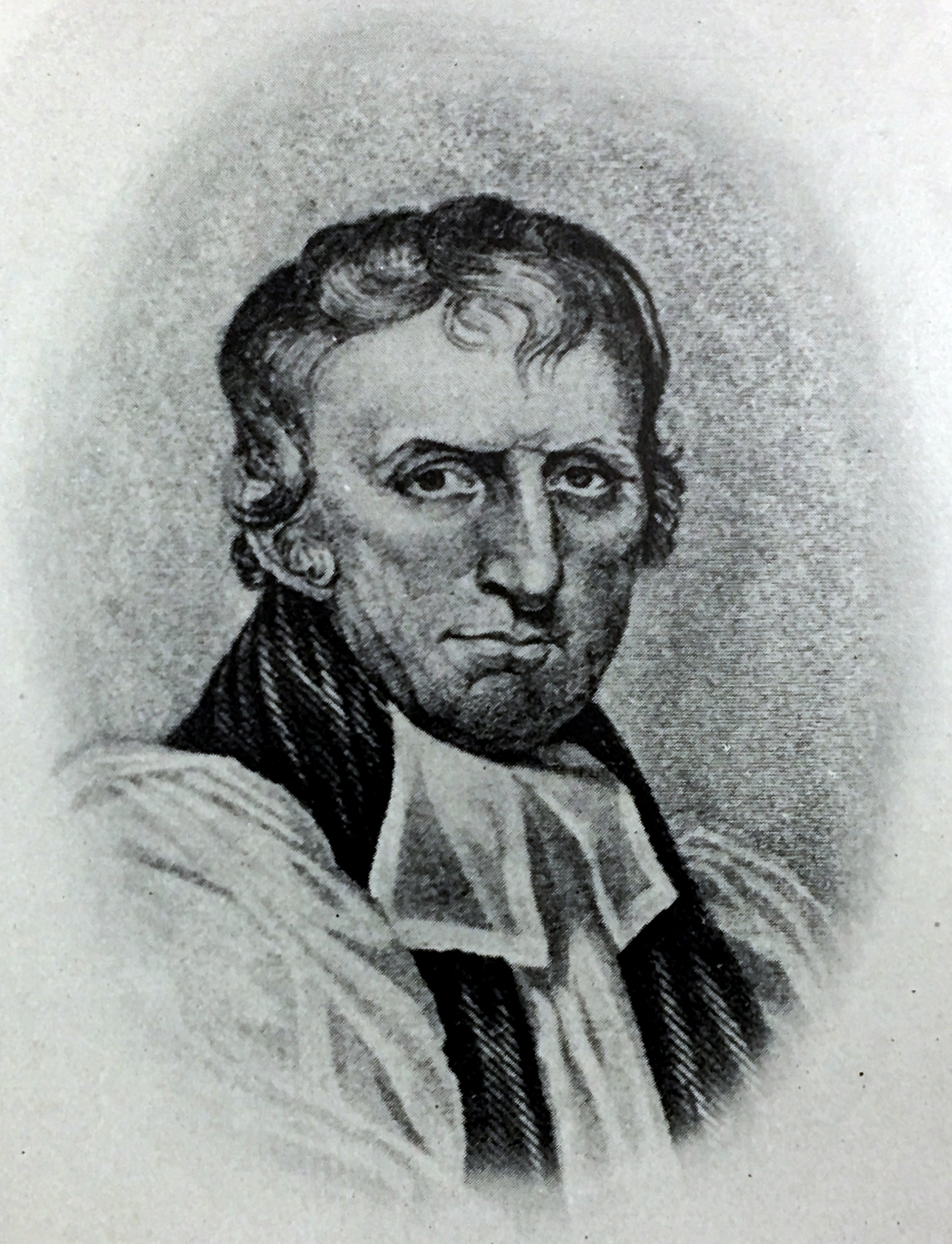
- Church: Episcopal Church
- Diocese: Maryland
- Elected: August 2, 1816
- In office: 1816–1827
- Predecessor: Thomas John Claggett
- Successor: William Murray Stone
- Previous post: Suffragan Bishop of Maryland (1814-1816)

Orders
- Ordination: December 27, 1789 by William White
- Consecration: September 1, 1814 by William White

Personal details
- Born: May 20, 1764 Keith Hall Aberdeenshire, Scotland
- Died: October 28, 1827 (aged 63) New Castle, Delaware, United States
- Buried: St. Paul's Episcopal Church (Baltimore, Maryland)
- Denomination: Anglican prev. Presbyterian
- Parents: Donald & Isabel Kemp
- Spouse: Elizabeth Kemp
- Children: 2

James Kemp (May 20, 1764 – October 28, 1827) was the second bishop of the Diocese of Maryland, US, from 1816 to 1827.

== Early life ==
James Kemp was born on May 20, 1764, in Keith Hall parish, Aberdeenshire, Scotland. He graduated from Marischal College in 1786. He emigrated to Maryland in 1787, and lived with a family in Dorchester County.

== Ministry ==
Brought up a Presbyterian, Kemp joined the Episcopal Church and studied theology under the direction of the Rev. Dr. John Bowie, rector of Great Choptank parish, Maryland. He received deacon's orders in Christ Church, Philadelphia on December 26, 1789, and He was ordained priest the very next day on December 27, 1789. Kemp was ordained to both orders by the Rt. Rev. William White. In August 1790, Kemp succeeded his theological instructor, Dr. Bowie and became rector of Great Choptank Parish, in Cambridge, Maryland, the county seat of Dorchester County. Kemp also served at Green Hill Church likewise on the Eastern Shore until 1813, when he was elected associate rector of St. Paul's Episcopal Church, Baltimore. Columbia College conferred on him an honorary Doctor of Divinity Degree in 1802.

Kemp was elected suffragan bishop and consecrated on September 1, 1814, serving under elderly Bishop Thomas J. Claggett and overseeing the parishes on the Eastern Shore. His consecrators included:

- The Most Reverend William White, fourth presiding bishop of the Episcopal Church
- The Right Reverend John Henry Hobart, third bishop of New York
- The Right Reverend Richard Channing Moore, second bishop of Virginia

James Kemp thus became the fifteenth bishop consecrated in the Episcopal Church. He succeeded bishop Claggett on the latter's death in 1816. As bishop, Kemp invited Deacon William Levington to his diocese in 1824, and helped him establish St. James First African Episcopal Church, the third African American Episcopal church in the new country.

== Death and legacy ==
Kemp died of injuries received in a stage coach accident near New Castle, Delaware, while returning from the consecration of Assistant Bishop Henry Onderdonk in Philadelphia. He was buried in the cemetery of Old St. Paul's Church in Baltimore.

== See also ==
- Succession of Bishops of the Episcopal Church in the United States

Episcopal Church (USA) titles
Preceded by Thomas John Claggett	Bishop of Maryland; 1816 – 1827	Succeeded by William Murray Stone
