= William Douglass (abolitionist) =

American Episcopal priest

The Reverend William Douglass
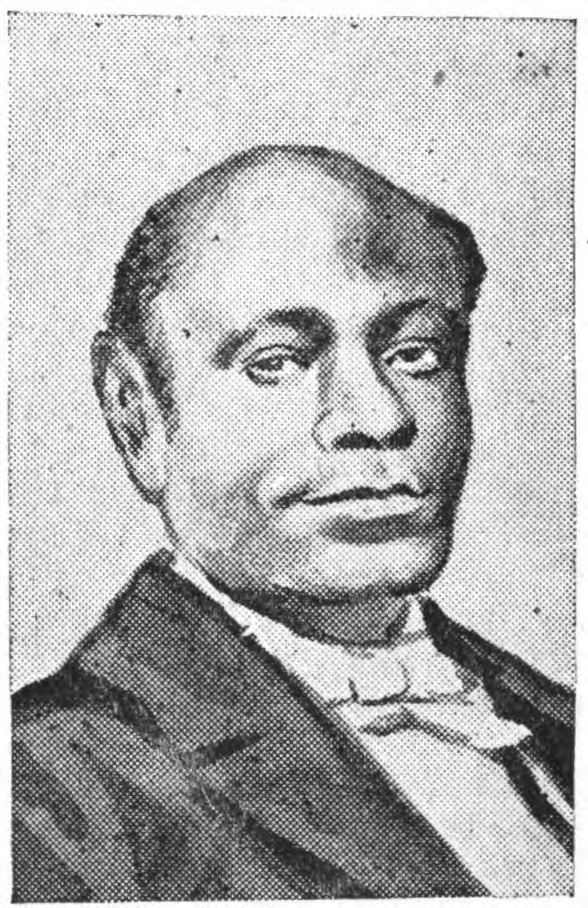
- Born: 1804; Baltimore, Maryland, US
- Died: May 22, 1862 (aged 57–58); Philadelphia, Pennsylvania, US
- Occupation: Reverend
- Movement: Colored Conventions Movement
- Spouse(s): Elizabeth; Sarah Mapps Douglass
- Children: 9

William Douglass (1804–1862) was an abolitionist and Episcopal priest. He preached for peace, racial equality, and education in the religious community.

== Early life ==
Douglass was born in Baltimore, Maryland, to African-American parents who were not enslaved, although such was legal in Maryland at the time. He received his education from Rev. William Levington, who founded the St. James Church and School for African Americans in Baltimore, Maryland in 1824. While attending the St. James Church School, Douglass learned Hebrew, Greek, and Latin.

== Career ==
Douglass became a Methodist preacher on Maryland's Eastern shore. On June 22, 1834, Maryland's bishop Stone ordained him an Episcopal deacon at St. Stephen's Church in Cecil County. Douglass then moved to Philadelphia to serve at the African Episcopal Church of St. Thomas where Pennsylvania Bishop Henry Onderdonk ordained him as a priest in 1836. Douglass published his first book, a history of his church called The Annals of the First African Church in the United States of America.

== Activism ==
Rev. Douglass advocated education in trades and academia. He also believed deeply in the spread of peace above all else, despite the religious and racial unrest which beset Philadelphia in the 1830s and continued with the Know Nothing Movement in the 1840s and 1850s. He was active in the Anti-Slavery Society. He also advocated equal representation in the Episcopalian church, as in a pamphlet published in the year he died.

== Family life ==
Douglass married twice. His first wife was named Elizabeth. This marriage produced nine children. After being widowed, Douglass remarried in 1855 to Philadelphia activist and artist Sarah Mapps Douglass (no relation), dying six years later. His passion for education influenced his eldest daughters Sarah, Elizabeth, Mary, Caroline to acquire trades.

== Death ==
Douglass died in Philadelphia, Pennsylvania on May 22, 1862.
