= William Murray Stone =

American Episcopal clergyman

The Right Reverend William Murray Stone D.D.
- Bishop of Maryland
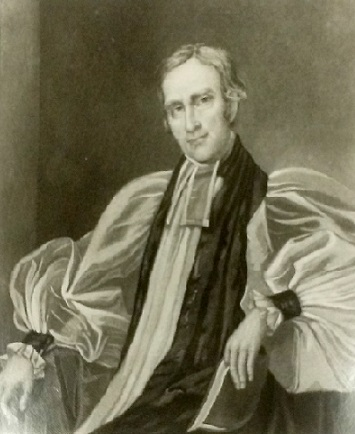
- Church: Episcopal Church
- Diocese: Maryland
- Elected: June 1, 1830
- In office: 1830–1838
- Predecessor: James Kemp
- Successor: William Rollinson Whittingham

Orders
- Ordination: December 27, 1803 by Thomas John Claggett
- Consecration: October 21, 1830 by William White

Personal details
- Born: June 1, 1779 Somerset County, Maryland, United States
- Died: February 26, 1838 (aged 58) Salisbury, Maryland, United States
- Buried: Parsons Cemetery in Salisbury, Maryland
- Denomination: Anglican
- Parents: William Stone & Elizabeth Murray
- Spouse: Anne Savage
- Children: 7

William Murray Stone, D.D. (June 1, 1779–February 26, 1838) was an American Episcopal clergyman from Maryland. He was bishop of the Episcopal Diocese of Maryland at Baltimore from 1830 until his death.

== Early life ==
William was born in Somerset County to John and Betsy (Murray) Stone. His family had been important in the development of Maryland for over a hundred years. His great-great-grandfather William Stone had served as governor of the colony, and a cousin (Thomas Stone) signed the Declaration of Independence. William attended Washington College in Chestertown, Maryland and graduated in 1799. After college, Stone studied theology.

== Ministry ==
Bishop Thomas Claggett ordained him a deacon in Prince George's County on December 3, 1803. After his ordination as priest, Kemp became rector of Stepney Parish then in Somerset County, Maryland. He served there for over twenty years until he was transferred to be rector of St. Paul's in Chestertown, Maryland in 1829.

After the unexpected death of bishop James Kemp in 1827, Maryland's clergy and lay delegates deadlocked as to his successor, and both future Massachusetts bishop Manton Eastburn and missionary bishop Jackson Kemper refused the position. In 1830 the diocesan convention again deadlocked as the same two prominent candidates (John Johns of the low-church party and William Edward Wyatt of the high church party) tied for election as bishop. Stone, although sickly, was nominated as a compromise candidate. His election was nearly unanimous. He was consecrated as bishop on October 21, 1830 in Baltimore by Bishops William White, Richard Channing Moore and Henry U. Onderdonk. Bishop Stone published a number of Pastoral Letters and some sermons.

== Death and legacy ==
He died in 1838 at Salisbury, Maryland and is buried next to his wife Anne Savage Stone (d. 1821) at the Parsons Cemetery in Wicomico County.

Episcopal Church (USA) titles
Preceded by James Kemp	Bishop of Maryland; 1830 – 1838	Succeeded by William Rollinson Whittingham
