= St. Stephen's Episcopal Church (Earleville, Maryland) =

Historic church in Maryland, United States

- U.S. National Register of Historic Places
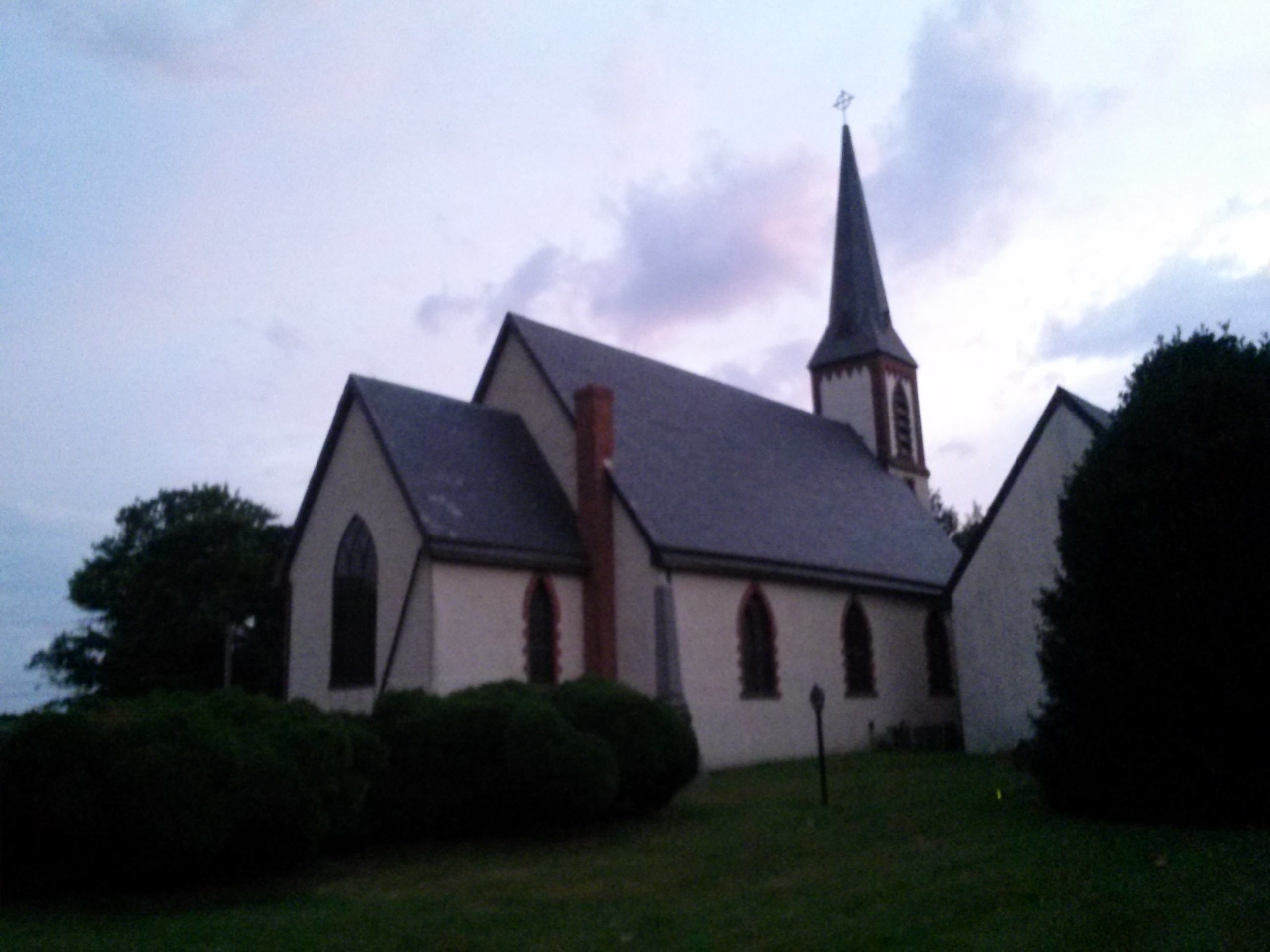

- Location within Maryland Location within the United States
- Location: Crystal Beach Road & Glebe Road, Earleville, Maryland
- Coordinates: 39°25′31″N 75°55′6″W
- Area: 3.4 acres (1.4 ha)
- Built: 1860
- Architect: Dixon, Thomas
- Architectural style: Gothic Revival
- NRHP reference No.: 82002810
- Added to NRHP: April 29, 1982

St. Stephen's Episcopal Church is a historic Episcopal church located in Earleville, Cecil County, Maryland.

North Sassafras Parish, as it was originally known, was one of the original 30 Anglican parishes in the Province of Maryland, named for its location north of the Sassafras River which separated Cecil County from Kent County, Maryland. On June 22, 1834, this parish hosted the ordination as an Episcopal deacon by bishop William Murray Stone of William Douglass, a Methodist preacher who then became the second rector of the historic African Episcopal Church of St. Thomas in Philadelphia (after Absalom Jones), where the African American abolitionist was ordained as a priest and served until his death in 1862.

The current church has a single-story rectangular stuccoed brick main block, three bays by three, resting on a partially excavated fieldstone foundation and covered by a steeply pitched slate roof. It features a 4-story bell tower with broach spire and patterned slate roof. This Gothic Revival structure was built in 1870–1874 but incorporated the walls of the earlier churches of 1824 and 1735. A graveyard surrounds the structure. The structure was designed by Thomas Dixon, a Baltimore architect.

It was listed on the National Register of Historic Places in 1982.
