= Benjamin T. Onderdonk =

American bishop

The Right Reverend Benjamin Tredwell Onderdonk
- 4th Bishop of New York
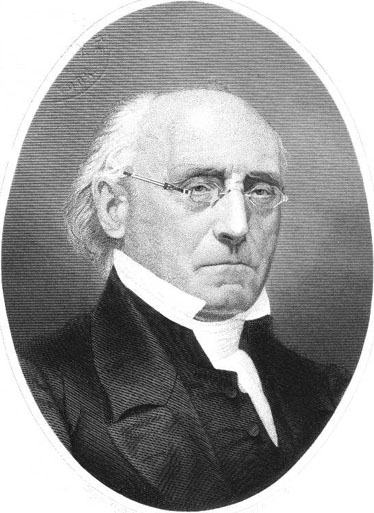
- Church: Episcopal Church
- Diocese: New York
- Elected: October 8, 1830
- In office: 1830–1861 Suspended 1845 and never restored
- Predecessor: John Henry Hobart
- Successor: Jonathan Mayhew Wainwright

Orders
- Ordination: July 26, 1815 by John Henry Hobart
- Consecration: November 26, 1830 by William White

Personal details
- Born: July 15, 1791 New York City, New York, United States
- Died: April 30, 1861 (aged 69) New York City, New York, United States
- Buried: Trinity Church (Manhattan)
- Denomination: Anglican
- Parents: John Onderdonk & Deborah Ustick
- Spouse: Elizabeth Handy Moscrop (m. 1813)
- Education: Columbia College

Benjamin Treadwell Onderdonk (July 15, 1791, in New York City – April 30, 1861, in New York) was the Bishop of the Episcopal Diocese of New York from 1830 to 1861.

== Early years ==
A member of a prominent Hempstead family, Onderdonk graduated from Columbia College, now Columbia University, where he was president of the Philolexian Society. He studied theology under Bishop John Henry Hobart and was a member of the Episcopal Theological Society between 1810 and 1811. He married Elizabeth Handy Moscrop, daughter of Rev. Henry Moscrop and Elizabeth Handy.

He presided over the Diocese during a period of expansion and was instrumental in the creation of numerous parishes, but is best remembered as one of the most controversial figures in the history of the Episcopal Church of the United States. He served as the officiant at the wedding of President John Tyler and Julia Gardiner at the Church of the Ascension in 1844.

== Consecrators ==
- William White, Bishop of Pennsylvania, Presiding Bishop of the ECUSA
- Thomas Church Brownell, Bishop of Connecticut
- Henry U. Onderdonk, Bishop of Pennsylvania, older brother of Benjamin Tredwell Onderdonk

== Ouster of DeGrasse ==
In the late 1830s, Onderdonk pressured Isaiah DeGrasse, an African American college graduate and aspiring deacon, to withdraw from the General Theological Seminary. Onderdonk argued that DeGrasse's presence would alienate Southern students and jeopardize the institution's viability. DeGrasse withdrew.

== The Carey Affair ==
A strong supporter of the Oxford Movement, Onderdonk became embroiled in a controversy surrounding the ordination of Arthur Carey. Carey, a candidate for the ministry acknowledged even by his detractors as being of superb intellect and dedication, and also of an excellent Christian character, was like Onderdonk greatly influenced by the Oxford Movement.

As his ordination approached, Carey was examined by the Rev. Dr. Hugh Smith, Rector of St. Peter's, New York (where he had been assigned). During this interview, Carey professed views that were sympathetic to Roman Catholicism, and thereafter Smith and some other clergy and laymen opposed Carey's ordination. At Smith's insistence, Onderdonk conducted an inquiry, which ultimately found Carey to be suitable for ordination, which was celebrated in 1843. The dispute did not end there, and a number of letters were published accusing Carey and ultimately Onderdonk of being overly sympathetic to Roman Catholicism. This controversy spread beyond the Diocese, and at least one other Diocese, that of Ohio, adopted a resolution condemning Onderdonk.

== Allegations of misconduct ==
As the Carey controversy was ongoing, William Meade, Bishop of Virginia (later the Presiding Bishop of the Episcopal Church in the Confederate States of America) received a number of affidavits of women who alleged that Onderdonk had made improper advances towards them and had engaged in improper touching. This eventually resulted in a trial before the House of Bishops. Throughout, Onderdonk maintained his innocence. By all accounts the trial was a bitter affair, with Onderdonk making accusations of a secret conspiracy to remove him due to his theological views by falsifying charges and Meade accusing the Onderdonk faction of witness intimidation. The trial resulted in the suspension of Onderdonk.

Whether the trial was an appropriate act to punish a Bishop for improper behavior or a conspiracy to silence a proponent of the Oxford Movement may be ultimately unknowable. The debate continued in published letters throughout Onderdonk's life and indeed continues today. What is clear though, as William Manross notes in A History of the American Episcopal Church (1935), was that the verdict against Onderdonk reflects "the bitter party feeling which prevailed at the time, especially as the voting throughout the trial was pretty much along party lines, all of the evangelicals voting to condemn Bishop Onderdonk and most, though not all, of the High Churchmen voting to acquit him."

Following his suspension, Onderdonk remained Bishop of the Episcopal Diocese of New York but was suspended from performing his duties. Provisional Bishops were consecrated to fill his duties. They were Jonathan Mayhew Wainwright I, consecrated to serve as Provisional Bishop in place of Bishop Onderdonk, 1852–1854 and Horatio Potter consecrated in 1854 to serve as Provisional Bishop in place of Onderdonk; became diocesan in 1861. His brother, Henry Ustick Onderdonk, Bishop of Pennsylvania, was also suspended upon allegations of intemperance during the same time period.

== Death ==
Benjamin Treadwell Onderdonk died at age 69 in 1861. His sarcophagus, now at Trinity Church in New York City, depicts him lying in repose yet crushing a serpent labeled "Scandal" beneath his heel.

== Bibliography ==
- Online documents connected with B.T. Onderdonk
- Charles Wells Hayes, The Diocese of Western New York: History and Recollections, 2nd ed., vol. I, p. 174.
- Cohen, Patricia Cline. "Ministerial Misdeeds: The Onderdonk Trial and Sexual Harassment in the 1840s." (1996)
- Juster, Susan & MacFarlane, Lisa. (Eds.). A Mighty Baptism: Race, Gender, and the Creation of American Protestantism. Ithaca, NY: Cornell University Press, (1995)
- William Manross, A History of the American Episcopal Church (1935)

Episcopal Church (USA) titles
| Preceded by John Henry Hobart | 4th Bishop of New York; 1830–1861 | Succeeded by Horatio Potter |
