= William Levington =

American clergyman, teacher (1793–1836)

- Born: 1793; New York City, New York, United States
- Died: May 1836 (aged 42–43); Baltimore, Maryland, United States
- Occupation: Clergyman

William Levington (1793 – May 15, 1836) was an African-American clergyman and teacher. The third African American ordained as a priest in the Episcopal Church of the United States, he established the first African-American congregation south of the Mason–Dixon line, and worked to educate African American youth.

== Early life ==
Born in New York City, by the time he was seven, Levington was living in Philadelphia and working in the bookstore of Sheldon Potter, along with Alonzo Potter, Sheldon's brother who later became Bishop of Pennsylvania (in 1845). In 1818, Alonzo Potter graduated from Union College in Schenectady, New York and began a teaching career there the following year. Levington wanted to study for the ministry and studied under Potter's tutelage until 1822, when Levington returned to Philadelphia to prepare for ordination under the guidance of Rev. Jackson Kemper, assistant to bishop William White. During at least his last years with Alonzo Potter, Levington lived and taught at a school for African American children in Albany. However, New York's Bishop John Henry Hobart refused to ordain him, despite having ordained Rev. Peter Williams Jr., likewise an African American, in 1819. Williams had become an abolitionist in addition to leading St. Philip's Episcopal Church, which had been founded by African American members of historic Trinity Church, Hobart's New York parish before becoming bishop. Levington likewise delivered addresses against slavery, including through the Ladies Philanthropic Benezet society, though that did not prevent Albany's mayor and others from providing glowing references upon his departure.

== Ministry ==
Bishop William White ordained Levington as a deacon at the Church of St. Thomas on March 14, 1824, three decades after ordaining Rev. Absalom Jones at the same church, and six years after Jones' death. However, Levington was not to remain with that congregation. Instead, Kemper wrote a letter of recommendation praising his conduct and piety, which led to an interview with Bishop James Kemp in Baltimore. On June 23, 1824, the new missionary established the St. James First African Protestant Episcopal Church and school in an upstairs room of a building at Marion and Park Avenues in Baltimore. At the time, Maryland law prohibited African American children from attending public schools, though they paid taxes.

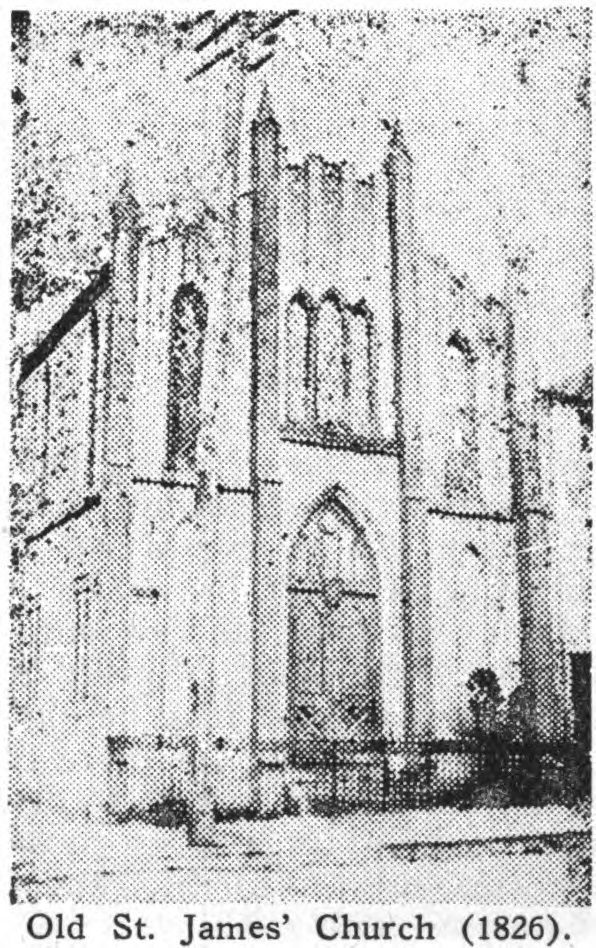
St. James First African Protestant Episcopal Church in 1926

The next year, lawyer James Bosley donated land to build a church for the new congregation, and George Whipple donated five thousand bricks, which with other financial donations enabled the congregation to build a new church at North (later renamed Guilford Avenue) and Saratoga Streets. Bishop Kemp consecrated the new building on March 23, 1827, and Levington's friend (and future bishop) Rev. John Prentiss Kewley Henshaw of St. Peter's Church delivered the first sermon.

Since Bishop Kemp died unexpectedly in October after a coach accident, Levington returned to Philadelphia's St. Thomas Church, and Bishop White ordained him as a priest on March 23, 1828. After some controversy during which Levington insisted that enslaved and free members of the congregation would receive the same rights, the new church was formally incorporated by Maryland's legislature in 1829. However, for several years Levington needed to travel through several northern states to raise sufficient money to keep the new church operating, pay the construction debt and fund his own salary, since the Episcopal church as a whole did not fund missionaries at the time.

Levington also spoke out against both slavery and the American Colonization Society, despite his donor Whipple's being the society's agent in Baltimore. In 1835, Levington signed a letter (along with Rev. John Fortie of the Sharp Street Methodist Episcopal Church and Rev. Nathaniel Peck of the Bethel Methodist Episcopal Church), which African American teacher and activist William Watkins thought was too conciliatory.

== Death and legacy ==
Levington died of bilious pleurisy on May 15, 1836, and was buried in Old Bethel African Cemetery, with his friend Henshaw paying the burial expenses. His successor was Rev. Joshua Peterkin, a recent white graduate of Virginia Theological Seminary, who soon left the mission congregation, as did several other pastors until George Freeman Bragg, who wrote and published a biography of his predecessor. St. James Church relocated twice under Bragg, including to its current location across from Baltimore's Lafayette Square, which continues to display a memorial marker honoring its founder.

William Douglass, who graduated from the St. James school and had become a Methodist minister, was ordained an Episcopal deacon at St. Stephen's Church in Cecil County, Maryland on June 22, 1834, and moved to Philadelphia to take charge of St. Thomas Church, where he was ordained a priest by Bishop Henry Onderdonk on February 14, 1836. He became that historic black parish's second rector (after Absalom Jones) and served until his death in 1862. Levington also taught the mother of A.M.E. Bishop Levi Coppin, husband of missionary and teacher Fanny Jackson Coppin, for whom Maryland's Coppin State University was later named.

An embroidered sampler which Levington gave to his donor James Bosley on July 4, 1832, was purchased by the DeWitt Wallace Decorative Arts Museum, and is displayed in Williamsburg, Virginia.
