= History of the Anglican Communion =

The history of the Anglican Communion may be attributed mainly to the worldwide spread of British culture associated with the British Empire. Among other things the Church of England spread around the world and, gradually developing autonomy in each region of the world, became the communion as it exists today.

== Origins ==
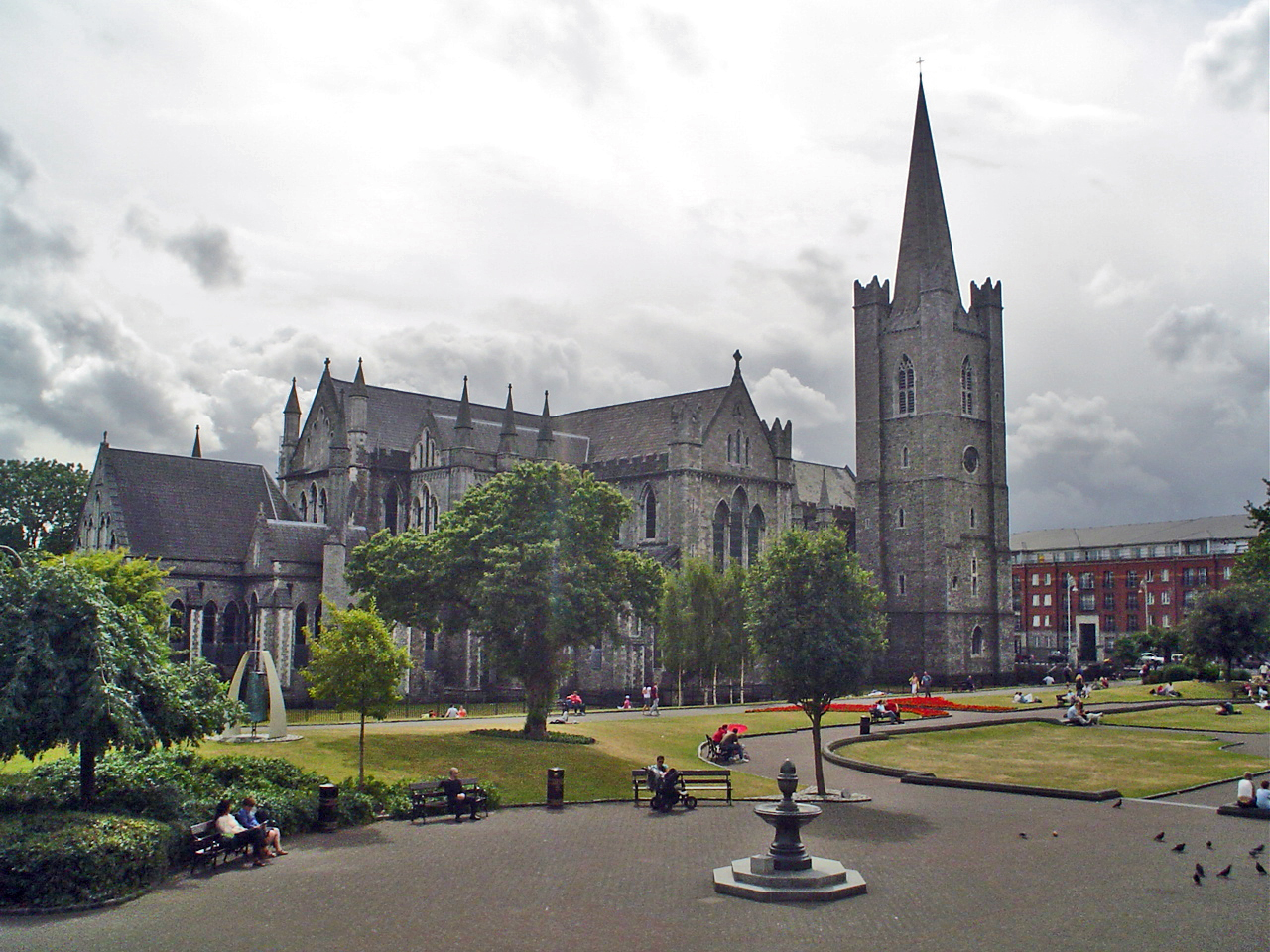
St Patrick's Cathedral, Dublin in Dublin.

The only provinces of the Anglican Communion with a direct and unbroken history stretching back to the pre-Reformation church are to be found in Great Britain and Ireland: the Church of England, the Church in Wales, the Church of Ireland and the Scottish Episcopal Church. As its name suggests, the Scottish situation is unique; the national Church of Scotland is Presbyterian and for some years in the late 17th and early 18th centuries the Scottish Episcopal Church, despite its similarities to the Church of England, was regarded with some suspicion because of its occasional associations with Jacobite opposition to the House of Hanover.

Although Henry VIII broke with the Church of Rome in the 1530s, he strongly resisted thereafter associating the English Church with the Continental Protestant Reformation. Henry's position was however, reversed in the brief reign of his young son Edward VI 1547–1553, when the leaders of the Church of England, especially Thomas Cranmer, actively sought to establish England in the centre of evolving Reformed churches. Cranmer's ambitions, however, were not widely shared amongst the bulk of laity and clergy; and accordingly, the return to the religious forms of traditional Roman Catholicism under Queen Mary was widely welcomed.

The Elizabethan Settlement in England was broken in 1570 with the excommunication of Elizabeth. Although few, if any, concessions were made to the Papacy or to Roman Catholic doctrine, a small number of changes were then made to the Articles of Religion and to the Prayer Book, especially in relation the Real Presence and to the continuation of worship in more traditional forms. Only one of Mary's English and Welsh bishops conformed to the Elizabethan settlement, though all save 300 of the parish clergy subscribed. In Ireland the position was reversed; all bishops save two accepted the Elizabethan Settlement, but the bulk of parish clergy and laity remained loyal to the pope. In the period since 1553, Continental Reformed Protestantism had itself continued to develop, especially in Geneva and Heidelberg, but English divines who wished the Elizabethan church to take part in these developments were to be bitterly disappointed; Elizabeth refused any further change to the forms or structures of religion established in 1559. In particular, Protestant controversialists began to attack the episcopal polity, and the defined liturgy of the Elizabethan Church as incompatible with the true Reformed tradition; and, in response, defenders of the established church began, from the early 17th Century onwards, to claim these specific features as positively desirable, or indeed essential.

The attempt to impose in Scotland a Prayer Book on the English model, drove the three kingdoms into civil war. However, the Puritan sympathies of the victorious Parliamentary armies in the English Civil War, and the consequential abolition during the Commonwealth of English bishoprics and cathedral chapters with the suppression of the Book of Common Prayer, resulted in English churchmen beginning to recognise Anglican identity as being distinct from and incompatible with the traditions of Presbyterian Protestantism. This distinction was formalised at the Restoration of Charles II, when the proposals of Puritan divines for further reform of the Prayer Book were thoroughly rejected; and 1,760 clergymen were deprived of their livings for failing to subscribe to the 1662 Book. From this date onwards dissenting Protestant congregations were to be found throughout England, and the established church no longer claimed or sought to comprehend all traditions of Protestant belief. In Ireland and in many of England's American Colonies, the numbers who subscribed to Presbyterian congregations formed the majority of the Protestant population; while in Scotland from 1689, following the accession of William and Mary, Presbyterian church polity was revived, and constituted in that kingdom, the established church; so that those ministers and congregations who continued to subscribe to the Anglican Episcopalian traditions eventually became a dissenting minority.

In the 18th and 19th centuries, divines of the Church of England increasingly differentiated their faith from that of the Protestant churches. Controversy broke out into the open after 1829, with the removal of religious restrictions on political rights in the United Kingdom, following which elected members of the UK Parliament (the legal authority in England for definitions of religious faith), might include both Roman Catholics and Dissenters. The Tractarians undertook a re-examination of Anglican traditions of the 19th century; developing these into the general principle that Anglicanism represented a via media between Protestantism and Catholicism; or otherwise, that the Church of England together with the Roman Catholic and Greek Orthodox churches, represented three 'branches' of the Universal Church, whose faith derived from Scripture and Tradition independent of legislative formulae. The issue was more pressing insofar as Anglican societies were engaging actively in missionary work, often in conjunction with Christians of other traditions; resulting in the foundation of new churches, especially in Africa. Anglican traditions implied an expectation that these churches should develop self-government and a locally based episcopacy; but it was unclear who had legal power to create such bishoprics, who had the authority to appoint to them, and what discretion such bishops would have to define local statements of faith and forms of worship. Matters came to a head with the case of John William Colenso appointed to the Bishopric of Natal in 1853. When Bishop Colenso published commentaries on the Epistle to the Romans and on the Pentateuch that questioned traditional teachings, he was deprived of his see by the bishops of the South African church in 1863; but then re-instated on appeal to the Judicial Committee of the Privy Council in 1866. Whatever the merits of the Colenso case, the implied action of a British court in constraining matters of faith and discipline in a church outside the United Kingdom was instrumental in the decision to summon the first Lambeth Conference in 1867.

As Britain's worldwide colonial empire grew, the Church of England began to spread with it. But at first no bishops were sent overseas; all colonial churches reported back to the Bishop of London. At the time of the American Revolution, there had already been considerable American demand for a local bishop; and after that event the Church of England in the new United States certainly needed to organize itself on a local basis.

== Anglicanism in the colonies ==
The first Anglican service in North America was conducted in California in 1579 by the chaplain accompanying Sir Francis Drake on his voyage around the globe. The first baptisms were held in Roanoke, North Carolina, by the ill-fated Roanoke colony. The continuous presence of Anglicanism in North America, however, begins in 1607 with the founding of Jamestown, Virginia. By 1700 there were more than 100 Anglican parishes in British colonies on the mainland of North America, the largest number in Virginia and Maryland. The American War for Independence resulted in the formation of the first independent national church in the Anglican tradition.

The 1609 wreck of the flagship of the Virginia Company, the Sea Venture, resulted in the settlement of Bermuda by the company. This was made official in 1612 when the town of St. George's, now the oldest surviving English settlement in the New World, was established. It is the location of St. Peter's Church, the oldest-surviving Anglican church outside of the British Isles (Britain and Ireland) and the oldest surviving non-Roman Catholic church in the New World, also established in 1612. It remained part of the Church of England until 1978 when the Anglican Church of Bermuda was formed. The Church of England was the state church in Bermuda and a system of parishes was set up for the religious and political subdivision of the colony (they survive, today, as both civil and religious parishes).

The parish of St. John the Baptist in the city of St. John's, Newfoundland (part of the Diocese of Eastern Newfoundland and Labrador) is the oldest in Canada, founded in 1699 in response to a petition drafted by the Anglican townsfolk of St. John's and sent to the Bishop of London, Henry Compton. In this petition the people also requested help in the rebuilding of their church, which had been destroyed, along with the rest of the city, in 1696 by the French under the command of General Pierre Le Moyne d'Iberville.

On August 12, 1787, Charles Inglis was consecrated Bishop of Nova Scotia with jurisdiction over all the British possessions in North America. In 1793 the see of Quebec was founded; Jamaica and Barbados followed in 1824 and Toronto and Newfoundland in 1839. Meanwhile, the needs of India were met, on the urgent representations in Parliament of William Wilberforce and others, by the consecration of T. F. Middleton as Bishop of Calcutta, with three archdeacons to assist him. In 1829, on the nomination of the Duke of Wellington, William Broughton was sent out to work as the Archdeacon of Australia. The first Anglican church in Latin America, St. John's Cathedral (Belize City), was built in the colony of British Honduras (Belize) in 1812.

Soon afterwards, in 1835 and 1837, the sees of Madras and Bombay were founded, while in 1836 Broughton himself was consecrated as the first Bishop of Australia. Thus down to 1840 there were but ten colonial bishops; and of these several were so hampered by civil regulations that they were little more than government chaplains in episcopal orders. In April of that year, however, Bishop Blomfield of London published his famous letter to the Archbishop of Canterbury, declaring that "an episcopal church without a bishop is a contradiction in terms" and strenuously advocating a great effort for the extension of the episcopate.

The plan was taken up with enthusiasm and, in 1841, the bishops of the United Kingdom met and issued a declaration which inaugurated the Colonial Bishoprics Council. Subsequent declarations in 1872 and 1891 served both to record progress and to stimulate to new effort. The Diocese of New Zealand was founded in 1841, being endowed by the Church Missionary Society through the council, and George Augustus Selwyn was chosen as the first bishop. Moreover, in many cases bishops were sent to inaugurate new missions, as in the cases of the Universities' Mission to Central Africa, Lebombo, Corea and New Guinea; and the missionary jurisdictions so founded developed in time into dioceses.

It was only very gradually that these dioceses acquired legislative independence and a determinate organization. At first, sees were created and bishops were nominated by the crown by means of letters patent; and in some cases an income was assigned out of public funds. Moreover, for many years all bishops were consecrated in England, took the customary "oath of due obedience" to the Archbishop of Canterbury, and were regarded as his extraterritorial suffragans. But by degrees changes were made on all these points.

== America ==
In 1783 the parishes of Connecticut elected Samuel Seabury as their bishop and sent him to England for ordination. However John Moore, Archbishop of Canterbury at the time, found that he had the authority neither to create new bishops without legislation nor to dispense with the Oath of Allegiance to the Crown which formed part of the ordination ceremony. Seabury then went to Scotland where, free from such legal difficulties, he was ordained in 1784. Eventually, with new legislation in place, the Archbishop of Canterbury was able to consecrate William White and Samuel Provoost as bishops for the new Protestant Episcopal Church in the United States of America in 1787 and James Madison, Bishop of Virginia in 1790.

The Protestant Episcopal Church held its first General Convention in 1785, and organized using a system of state conventions in place of dioceses. They adopted a constitution and canons and approved an American version of the Book of Common Prayer in 1789 in Philadelphia. William White, who had served as presiding officer of General Convention in 1785 and 1786, was also elected presiding officer of the 1789 convention. He was the first bishop to preside over the convention. When in a second session of the 1789 convention, Bishop Seabury was seated and the New England churches acceded to the constitution. The bishops then withdrew and Bishop Seabury became the first bishop to preside over a separate House of Bishops. The American church officially adopted the term "diocese" in 1839 with the formation of a second diocese in the state of New York.

== Provincial organization ==
Local conditions soon made a provincial organization necessary, and it was gradually introduced. The bishop of Calcutta received letters patent as metropolitan of India when the sees of Madras and Bombay were founded; and fresh patents were issued to Bishop Broughton in 1847 and Bishop Gray in 1853, as metropolitans of Australia and South Africa respectively. Similar action was taken in 1858, when Bishop Selwyn became metropolitan of New Zealand; and again in 1860, when, on the petition of the Canadian bishops to the Crown and the colonial legislature for permission to elect a metropolitan, letters patent were issued appointing Bishop Fulford of Montreal to that office. Subsequently, metropolitans were chosen and provinces formed by regular synodical action, a process greatly encouraged by the resolutions of the Lambeth Conferences on the subject. The constitution of these provinces was not uniform. In some cases, as South Africa, New South Wales, and Queensland, the metropolitan see was fixed. Elsewhere, as in New Zealand, where no single city can claim pre-eminence, the metropolitan was either elected or else was the senior bishop by consecration. Two further developments must be mentioned:

- The creation of diocesan and provincial synods, the first diocesan synod to meet being that of New Zealand in 1844, while the formation of a provincial synod was foreshadowed by a conference of Australasian bishops at Sydney in 1850;
- Towards the close of the 19th century the title of archbishop began to be assumed by the metropolitans of several provinces. It was first assumed by the metropolitans of Canada and Rupert's Land, at the desire of the Canadian general synod in 1893; and subsequently, in accordance with a resolution of the Lambeth Conference of 1897, it was given by their synods to the bishop of Sydney as metropolitan of New South Wales and to the bishop of Cape Town as metropolitan of South Africa. Civil obstacles delayed its adoption by the metropolitan of India.

== Freedom from state control ==
By degrees, also, the colonial churches were freed from their rather burdensome relations with the state. The Church of the West Indies was disestablished in 1868. Other colonial churches followed suit over the next few decades.

In 1857 it was decided, in Regina v. Eton College, that the Crown could not claim the presentation to a living when it had appointed the former incumbent to a colonial bishopric, as it does in the case of an English bishopric. In 1861, after some protest from Crown lawyers, two missionary bishops were consecrated without letters patent for regions outside British territory: C. F. Mackenzie for the Zambezi region and J. C. Patteson for Melanesia, by the metropolitans of Cape Town and New Zealand respectively.

In 1863 the privy council declared, in Long v. The Bishop of Cape Town, that "the Church of England, in places where there is no church established by law, is in the same situation with any other religious body." In 1865 it adjudged Bishop Gray's letters patent, as metropolitan of Cape Town, to be powerless to enable him "to exercise any coercive jurisdiction, or hold any court or tribunal for that purpose," since the Cape colony already possessed legislative institutions when they were issued; and his deposition of Bishop Colenso was declared to be "null and void in law" (re The Bishop of Natal). With the exception of Colenso the South African bishops forthwith surrendered their patents, and formally accepted Bishop Gray as their metropolitan, an example followed in 1865 in the province of New Zealand.

In 1862, when the Diocese of Ontario was formed, the bishop was elected in Canada, and consecrated under a royal mandate, letters patent being by this time entirely discredited. And when, in 1867, a coadjutor was chosen for the bishop of Toronto, an application for a royal mandate produced the reply from the colonial secretary that "it was not the part of the Crown to interfere in the creation of a new bishop or bishopric, and not consistent with the dignity of the Crown that he should advise Her Majesty to issue a mandate which would not be worth the paper on which it was written, and which, having been sent out to Canada, might be disregarded in the most complete manner."

And by the turn of the century the colonial churches were entirely free in this matter. This, however, was not the case with the Church in India. Here the bishops of sees founded down to 1879 received a stipend from the revenue (with the exception of the bishop of Ceylon). They were not only nominated by the Crown and consecrated under letters patent, but the appointment was expressly subjected "to such power of revocation and recall as is by law vested" in the Crown; and where additional oversight was necessary for the Church in Tinnevelly, it could only be secured by the consecration of two assistant bishops, who worked under a commission for the Archbishop of Canterbury which was to expire on the death of the bishop of Madras. Since then, however, new sees were founded which are under no such restrictions.

== Autonomy ==
By degrees, also, the relations of colonial churches to the Archbishop of Canterbury changed. Until 1855 no colonial bishop was consecrated outside the British Isles, the first instance being Bishop MacDougall of Labuan, consecrated in India under a commission from the Archbishop of Canterbury; and until 1874 it was held to be unlawful for a bishop to be consecrated in England without taking the suffragan's Oath of Due Obedience. This necessity was removed by the Colonial Clergy Act 1874, which permitted the Archbishop of Canterbury at his discretion to dispense with the oath.

But the most complete autonomy did not involve isolation. The churches were in full communion with one another and acted together in many ways; missionary jurisdictions and dioceses were mapped out by common arrangement and even transferred if it seems advisable; e.g., the Diocese of Honolulu (Hawaii), previously under the jurisdiction of the Archbishop of Canterbury, was transferred in 1900 to the Episcopal Church in the United States of America on account of political changes. Missionary activity of the Episcopal Church in the United States of America resulted in creation of other provinces of the communion, including Brazil, Mexico, Central America, the Philippines and Japan. In Brazil and Japan the Church of England also had a presence, but the Episcopal Church work was more extensive and the Episcopal Church consecrated the first bishops.

Though the See of Canterbury claims no primacy over the Anglican Communion analogous to that exercised over the Roman Catholic Church by the Pope, it is regarded with a strong affection and deference, which shows itself by frequent consultation and interchange of greetings. By this the Archbishop of Canterbury is held as the titular and spiritual head of the Anglican Communion, but his role is strictly an honorary one.

== Lambeth Conferences ==
The conference of Anglican bishops from all parts of the world, instituted by Archbishop Longley in 1867 and known as the Lambeth Conferences, though even for the Anglican Communion they have not the authority of an ecumenical synod and their decisions are rather of the nature of counsels than commands, have done much to promote the harmony and co-operation of the various churches within Anglicanism.

An even more imposing manifestation of this common life was given by the great Pan-Anglican Congress held in London between June 12 and June 24, 1908, which preceded the Lambeth Conference opened on July 5. The idea of this originated with Bishop Montgomery, secretary to the Society for the Propagation of the Gospel, and was endorsed by a resolution of the United Boards of Mission in 1903.

As the result of negotiations and preparations extending over five years, 250 bishops, together with delegates, clerical and lay, from every diocese in the Anglican Communion, met at Lambeth Palace, the opening service of intercession being held in Westminster Abbey. In its general character the meeting was but a church congress on an enlarged scale and the subjects discussed, e.g. the attitude of churchmen towards the question of the marriage laws or that of socialism, followed much the same lines. The conference had no power to decide or to legislate for the church, its main value being in drawing its scattered members closer together, in bringing the newer and more isolated parts into consciousness of their contact with the parent stem, and in opening the eyes of the Church of England to the point of view and the peculiar problems of the daughter-churches.

== Bonn Agreement ==
In 1931 the Anglican Communion and the Old Catholics of the Union of Utrecht enter into full communion in the Bonn Agreement. Both the Old Catholics and the Anglicans agree on several key points:

1. Each communion recognises the catholicity and independence of the other and maintains its own.
2. Each communion agrees to permit members of the other communion to participate in the sacraments.
3. Inter-communion does not require from either communion the acceptance of all doctrinal opinion, sacramental devotion or liturgical practice characteristic of the other, but implies that each believes the other to hold all the essentials of the Christian faith.

With this new inter-communion cross-episcopal ordinations began, further endorsing the apostolic succession within Anglicanism.

== Modern history ==
Meetings began in 1937 about inter-communion between the Episcopal Church and the Presbyterians. After two years these talks arrived at no concrete conclusion because the Episcopalians insisted on the historic episcopate. The Presbyterians backed out of the talks in 1940.

== See also ==
- Global Fellowship of Confessing Anglicans
- Personal Ordinariate of Our Lady of Walsingham
