= Arthur Carey =

American priest

Arthur Carey (June 26, 1822 – April 4, 1844) was an Episcopal churchman known for his support of the Oxford Movement. His controversial ordination sparked heated debate not only within the Episcopal Church but in the United States in general.

Born near London, Carey immigrated with his family to New York City at the age of eight. At the age of 12, he informed his family of his desire to dedicate himself to the ministry. He was admitted to Columbia College (now Columbia University) at the age of 13 and graduated three years later at the top of his class. He attended General Theological Seminary while it was under the presidency of Bishop Benjamin Treadwell Onderdonk. Carey's outspoken support of the Oxford Movement led to objections that he supported Roman Catholic doctrine. Onderdonk held a trial (convened June 30, 1843) which exonerated him. Onderdonk later ordained him as a deacon. The ordination was held at St. Stephen's Church, New York City on July 8, 1843. At the ordination, two clergyman (Rev. Hugh Smith and Rev. Dr. Anthon) raised objections. The bishop dismissed their objections on the basis that they had already been investigated and were not substantiated. Carey was ordained, but Bishop Onderdonk became a visible target to those opposed to the Oxford Movement. This incident is often cited as the reason for Bishop Onderdonk's own trial and suspension. Carey held his first service at Annunciation Church on the second Sunday of October 1843. However he fell sick in December. His doctors recommended a trip to Cuba and in March 1844 he left on a voyage to Havana. He died April 4 on the voyage to Cuba, and was buried at sea the following day which was Good Friday. He had died at the age of 21.
