= Abraham Jarvis =

American bishop

The Right Reverend Abraham Jarvis
- Bishop of Connecticut
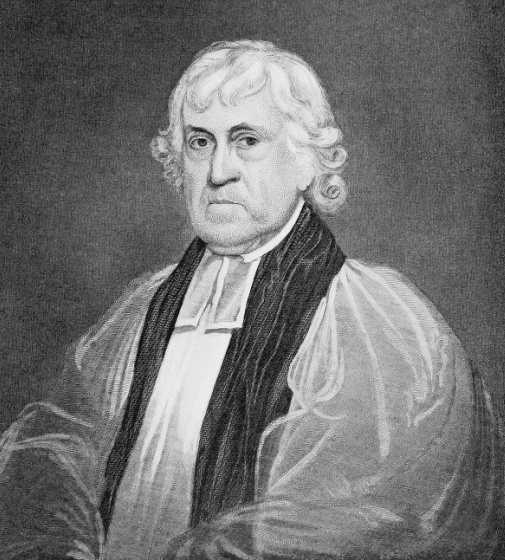
- Church: Episcopal Church
- Diocese: Connecticut
- In office: 1797–1813
- Predecessor: Samuel Seabury
- Successor: Thomas Church Brownell

Orders
- Ordination: February 19, 1764 by Charles Lyttelton
- Consecration: October 18, 1797 by William White

Personal details
- Born: May 5, 1739 Norwalk, Connecticut Colony
- Died: May 3, 1813 (aged 73) New Haven, Connecticut, United States
- Buried: Trinity Church on the Green
- Denomination: Anglican
- Parents: Samuel Jarvis & Naomi Brush
- Spouse: Ann Farmer (1766–1801); Lucy Lewis (1806–1813)

Abraham Jarvis (May 5, 1739 – May 3, 1813) was the second American Episcopal bishop of the Episcopal Diocese of Connecticut and eighth in succession of bishops in the Episcopal Church. He was a high churchman and a loyalist to the crown.

== Biography ==
Jarvis was born in Norwalk, Connecticut and graduated from Yale College in 1761. He studied under the Rev. Thomas Bradbury Chandler, rector of St. John's Episcopal Church, Elizabeth, N.J. He was ordained deacon on February 5, 1764, and priest on February 19, 1764, by the Church of England. He served as rector of Christ Church, Middletown, Connecticut, from 1764 to 1799.

Jarvis served as a chaplain to imprisoned Loyalist sympathizers during the American Revolution. He presided at a convention in New Haven, Connecticut, of clergy of Connecticut on July 23, 1776, which decided to suspend worship in the colony for fear of the British. He was one of ten Episcopal priests who met in Woodbury, Connecticut, on March 25, 1783, and elected Samuel Seabury as the first bishop of the Episcopal Church, serving as secretary of the meeting. Jarvis was consecrated second bishop of Connecticut on October 18, 1797. Completing his service in Middletown in 1799, he then served in Cheshire until 1803 and finally in New Haven, where he died. His remains are interred under the high altar at Trinity Church on the Green.

Jarvis Hall, the oldest dormitory at Trinity College in Hartford, Connecticut, is named after Abraham Jarvis.

== Consecrators ==
- The Right Reverend William White (second in succession), first presiding bishop of the Episcopal Church and first bishop of Pennsylvania
- The Right Reverend Samuel Provoost, (third in succession), third presiding bishop of the Episcopal Church and first bishop of New York
- The Right Reverend Edward Bass (seventh in succession), first bishop of Massachusetts

== Publications ==
- "Sermon on the Death of Bishop Seabury", 1796

== See also ==
- Succession of Bishops of the Episcopal Church in the United States

== Notes and references ==
- Historical material by and about Jarvis from Project Canterbury

Episcopal Church (USA) titles
Preceded by Samuel Seabury	2nd Bishop of Connecticut; October 18, 1797 – May 3, 1813	Succeeded by Thomas Church Brownell
