= Pan-Anglican Congress =

The first Pan-Anglican Congress was held in London (United Kingdom) from June 15 to June 24, 1908, immediately prior to the Fifth Lambeth Conference held in July of the same year. Designed as a consultation on mission, the Congress was a meeting of some 17,000 people attended both by clergy and laity.

The Congress was initiated by Bishop Henry H. Montgomery, Secretary of the SPG. Principal meetings were held at the Royal Albert Hall in South Kensington.

The Congress marked a period of organizational transition for Anglican church mission work and a growing recognition of the cultural diversity, organizational autonomy, but interlinked character of member churches of the Anglican Communion.

== See also ==
- History of the Anglican Communion
- Julia Chester Emery
- William West Jones
