= Henry Onderdonk =

American bishop (1789–1858)

The Right Reverend Henry Ustick Onderdonk D.D.
- Bishop of Pennsylvania
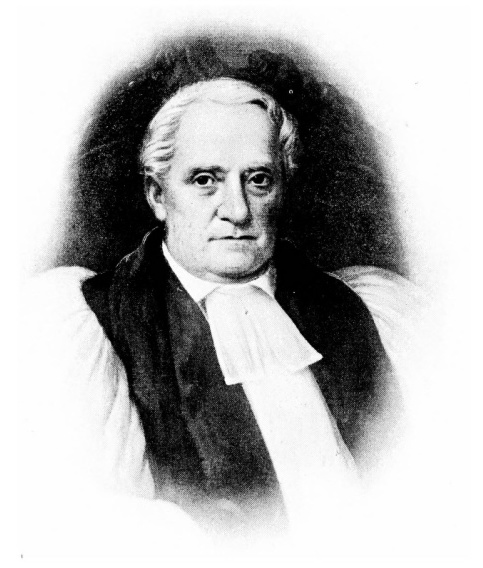
- Onderdonk in 1897
- Church: Episcopal Church
- Diocese: Pennsylvania
- Elected: July 17, 1836
- In office: 1836–1844
- Predecessor: William White
- Successor: Alonzo Potter
- Previous post: Assistant Bishop of Pennsylvania (1827-1836)

Orders
- Ordination: April 11, 1816 by John Henry Hobart
- Consecration: October 25, 1827 by William White

Personal details
- Born: March 16, 1789 New York City, U.S.
- Died: December 6, 1858 (aged 69) Philadelphia, Pennsylvania, U.S.
- Buried: Church of St. James the Less
- Spouse: Elizabeth Carter
- Children: 8
- Education: Columbia University; University of Edinburgh

Henry Ustick Onderdonk (March 16, 1789 – December 6, 1858) was the second Episcopal bishop of Pennsylvania.

== Early life ==
Onderdonk was born in New York City. He studied at Columbia University, where he was a member of the Philolexian Society, receiving his degree in 1805, and then traveled to Britain for further education, receiving his medical degree from the University of Edinburgh. On returning to the United States, Onderdonk practiced medicine in New York before being ordained to the diaconate and priesthood by Bishop John Henry Hobart. In 1816, he went to western New York as a missionary and then returned east to become rector of St. Ann's Church in Brooklyn, remaining there for seven years.

== Bishop of Pennsylvania ==
Onderdonk was elected assistant bishop of Pennsylvania in 1827, serving initially as assistant to Bishop William White. He was the 21st bishop of the ECUSA, and was consecrated by bishops William White, Alexander Viets Griswold, and James Kemp. However, bishop Kemp died of injuries received in a stage coach accident while returning from the consecration, so Onderdonk substituted in the Episcopal Diocese of Maryland until a successor was elected. In 1830, Onderdonk published Episcopacy Tested In Scripture, first published in the Protestant Episcopalian and then as tract by the Protestant Episcopal Tract Society, a defense of episcopacy based "on an appeal to the bible alone."

On Bishop White's death in 1836, Onderdonk succeeded him as bishop. Onderdonk was a strong advocate of the pre-Tractarian High Church position, in company with his brother Benjamin Treadwell Onderdonk, who was also a bishop. When the Rev. Alexander Crummell petitioned to be allowed to move to Pennsylvania to establish another church (besides the peripatetic St. Thomas congregation) to serve Philadelphia's African-American community, Bishop Onderdonk reportedly replied, "I will receive you into this diocese on one condition: No negro priest can sit in my church convention and no negro church must ask for representation there." Crummell reportedly paused for a moment before declining.

In 1844, Onderdonk was suspended from the exercise of his Episcopal office after rumors of alcoholism. The suspension was lifted in 1856, two years before his death.

He is buried in the churchyard of Church of St. James the Less in Philadelphia.

== Notes ==
Episcopal Church (USA) titles
Preceded by William White	2nd Bishop of Pennsylvania coadjutor 1827-1836; 1836-1844	Succeeded by Alonzo Potter
