= Julia Chester Emery =

American saint (1852–1922)

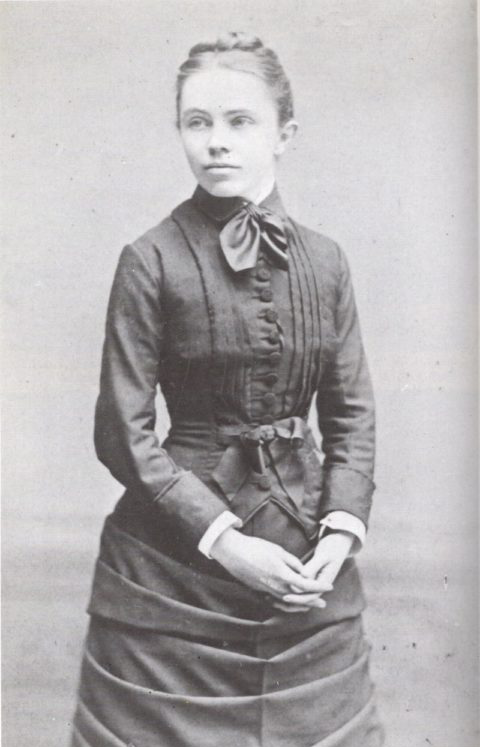
- Founder of the United Thank Offering

Lay Leader and Missionary
- Born: September 24, 1852; Dorchester, Massachusetts, US
- Died: January 9, 1922 (aged 69); New York City, US
- Honored in: Episcopal Church
- Feast: January 9

Julia Chester Emery (September 24, 1852 – January 9, 1922) was the National Secretary of the Women's Auxiliary of the Board of Missions for forty years, from 1876 to 1916. The Episcopal Church calendar honors her with a feast on January 9.

== Early life ==
Julia was the daughter of Captain Charles Emery, a sea captain and devout Episcopalian. He and his wife Susan had eleven children, the majority of whom distinguished themselves in religious service. Two sons became priests. His daughter Mary preceded Julia as National Secretary of the Auxiliary and served from 1872 to 1876. Three other daughters (Susan, Margaret and Helen) also supported Episcopal missions at home and abroad, including making their home on 24th Street available to foreign missionaries visiting the United States.

== Career ==
During her four decades as National Secretary, a position she first held at age 24, Julia visited every diocese in the United States, coordinating and encouraging work in support of missions. Invited by the Bishop of New York, Emery traveled to London as a delegate to the Pan-Anglican Congress and the Lambeth Conference in 1908. She traveled to Japan, China, Hong Kong and the Philippines to advance missionary work there, and to be able to report on it to the Episcopal women in the United States. Through her self-effacing work, women received canonical status as deaconesses and the Women's Auxiliary received an important role in the General Convention.

Emery founded the United Thank Offering (UTO). This worked by giving each woman a small box with a slit in the top and encouraging her to drop a small contribution into it whenever she felt thankful for something. Once a year, the women of the parish presented these at a Sunday service. The money was sent to national headquarters to be used for missions.

== Death and legacy ==
"Miss Julia" died in New York City, and was buried at the cemetery of St. James the Less, Scarsdale, New York.

The United Thank Offering continues to this day, and collects and gives away over $1 million annually.

In 1988, the General Convention of The Episcopal Church authorized the commemoration of Julia Chester Emery on January 9 on a trial basis. Her commemoration was met with final approval and entered into the Book of Common Prayer calendar in 1997.

== Sources ==
- Brightest and Best: A Companion to the Lesser Feasts and Fasts by Sam Portaro (Cowley, 2001).
- The Proper for the Lesser Feast and Fasts: 2006. New York, NY: Church Publishing. 2006.
- Don S. Armentrout; Robert Boak Slocum (1984). Documents of Witness: A History of the Episcopal Church 1782–1985. New York, NY: Church Publishing. pp. 429–433. ISBN 0-89869-237-7.
