= Thomas Church Brownell =

19th-century American Episcopal bishop

The Most Reverend Thomas Church Brownell
- 7th Presiding Bishop of the Episcopal Church
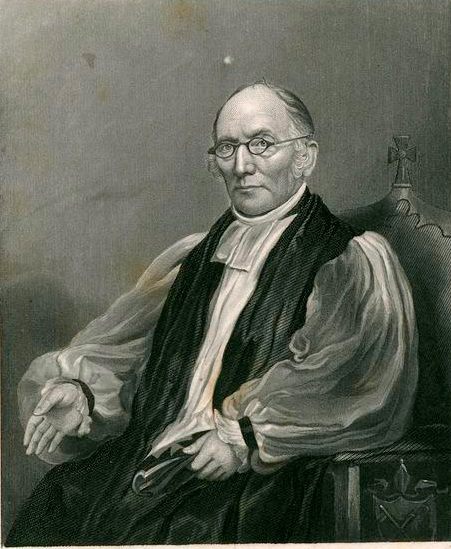
- Church: Episcopal Church
- Appointed: 1852
- In office: 1852–1865
- Predecessor: Philander Chase
- Successor: John Henry Hopkins
- Other post: Bishop of Connecticut (1819–1865)

Orders
- Ordination: August 4, 1816 by John Henry Hobart
- Consecration: October 27, 1819 by William White

Personal details
- Born: October 19, 1779 Westport, Massachusetts, U.S.
- Died: January 13, 1865 (aged 85) Hartford, Connecticut, U.S.
- Buried: Cedar Hill Cemetery (Hartford, Connecticut)
- Denomination: Anglican
- Parents: Sylvester Brownell and Mercy Church
- Spouse: Charlotte Dickinson
- Children: 3

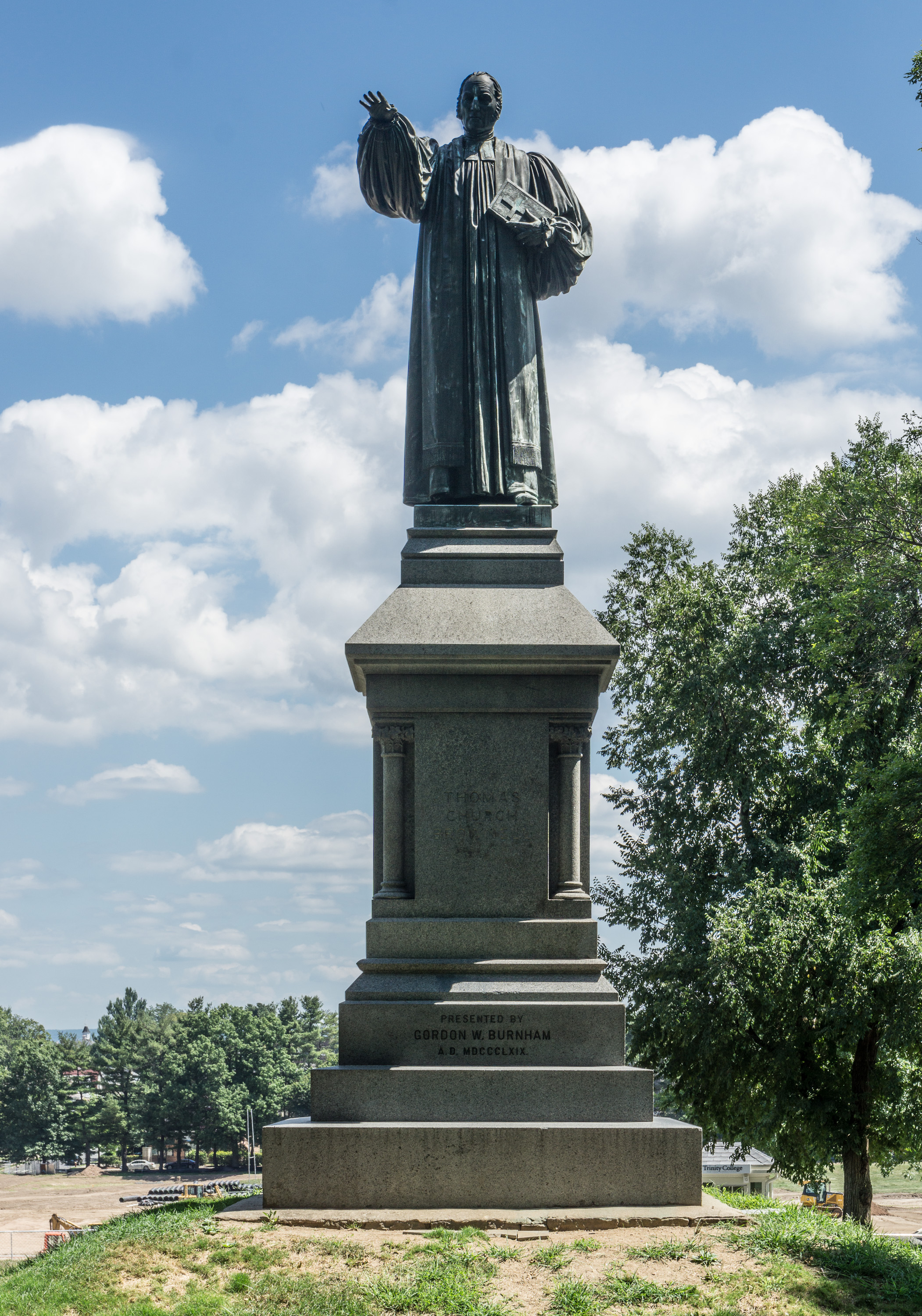
Statue of Thomas Church Brownell at Trinity College.

Thomas Church Brownell (October 19, 1779 – January 13, 1865) was founder of Trinity College in Hartford, Connecticut, and Presiding Bishop of the Episcopal Church from 1852 to 1865.

== Biography ==
Brownell was born in Westport, Massachusetts, on October 19, 1779. He was a descendant on his mother's side from Colonel Benjamin Church, an early settler in Little Compton, Rhode Island, and the father of American ranging. He studied at Union College, Schenectady, New York, receiving his degree in 1804.

Brownell was ordained to the diaconate and priesthood by Bishop John Henry Hobart. He was consecrated Bishop of Connecticut in New Haven on October 27, 1819. Brownell's extensive writings include diocesan charges, liturgical material, scriptural commentaries and other works. He founded Washington College (now known as Trinity College), Hartford as part of the Episcopal Church's goal of educating its young men the college would serve as the churches seminary. Brownell served as its first president for nearly a decade.

In the 1830s, Brownell worked tirelessly to expand the Episcopal Church in Louisiana, Alabama, and Mississippi, places beginning to flourish due to the expansion of American slavery.

Brownell served as Presiding Bishop of the Episcopal Church from 1852 until his death, succeeding Philander Chase.

Brownell was buried at Cedar Hill Cemetery, next to Samuel and Elizabeth Colt. Brownell had presided over their wedding in 1856.

== American Colonization Society ==
The American Colonization Society would add a chapter in Connecticut when the Connecticut Colonization Society was founded in May of 1827. Rev. Brownell is voted as a manager of the chapter, which is a board of director position. In their Address to the Public by the Managers of the Colonization Society of Connecticut, Brownell and his fellow managers stated that the " African in this country belongs by birth to the very lowest station in society; and from that station he can never rise, be his talents, his enterprise, his virtues, what they may. In consequence of this it is that they are what they are.” The rigid racial order upheld by the Connecticut managers thus justified the sole purpose of their national organization. “The simple object of the American Colonization Society,” they announced, “is to plant Colonies of free blacks from the United States upon the coast of Africa.”

The CCS would thus work to raise monies for the removal of Black Americans to a colony in Liberia. Moving Black persons from the United States to Africa, the members of the CCS believed, would solve the issue of American slavery. And by educating African-Americans to go to Africa as missionaries and bring the knowledge of Christ to native Africans, CCS leaders believed they were righting a moral wrong that started with the African slave trade. However, many Black Americans in Connecticut opposed the goals of the CCS. By the start of the American Civil War, the Colonization Societies would diminish in power and influence. Between 1821 and 1867, only 10,000 Black Americans would migrate to Liberia. In 1847, the colony would declare its independence from the American Colonization Society. This led to the society declining in popularity and in 1964 it would officially dissolve.

== Statue ==
Brownell's son-in-law Gordon Burnham commissioned artist Chauncey Ives to design a larger-than-life bronze statue of Brownell to be placed at Brownell's grave in Cedar Hill Cemetery. It was cast in 1869 by the foundry of Ferdinand von Miller of Munich. Burnham decided to donate the statue to Trinity College instead. The statue was first erected November 11, 1869, overlooking Bushnell Park, at the original site of the college. It was moved in 1878 to the main quadrangle of the new Trinity Campus.

Episcopal Church (USA) titles
Preceded by Philander Chase	7th Presiding Bishop; 1852–1865	Succeeded by John Henry Hopkins
Preceded by Abraham Jarvis	3rd Bishop of Connecticut; 1819-1865	Succeeded by John Williams
