= Richard Channing Moore =

American bishop (1762–1841)

The Right Reverend Richard Channing Moore
- Bishop of Virginia
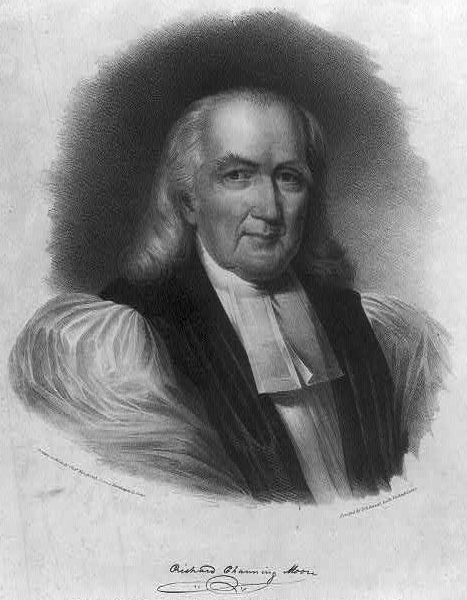
- Church: Episcopal Church
- Diocese: Virginia
- Elected: May 5, 1814
- In office: 1814–1841
- Predecessor: James Madison
- Successor: William Meade

Orders
- Ordination: October 22, 1787 by Samuel Provoost
- Consecration: May 18, 1814 by William White

Personal details
- Born: April 21, 1762 Manhattan
- Died: November 11, 1841 (aged 79) Lynchburg, Virginia
- Buried: Hollywood Cemetery, Richmond, Virginia
- Parents: Thomas Moore, II (1722 - (19-Jun-1784) m. 1744 Elizabeth Channing (1728 - 7-Dec-1805); Thomas was a Vestryman of Trinity Church 1750-62, 1779-84.
- Spouse: Christian Jones (1784 - April 20, 1796, her death); Sarah Mersereau (March 23, 1797 - August 1824, her death)
- Children: 5 with Christian; 6 with Sarah
- Occupation: Physician, clergyman

Richard Channing Moore (August 21, 1762 – November 11, 1841) was the second bishop of the Diocese of Virginia (1814–1841).

== Life and career ==
Coat of Arms of Richard Channing Moore

Moore was born in Manhattan. His classical education at King's College began at age eight, but was interrupted when his family moved to West Point, New York during the American Revolutionary War. After an experiment with life at sea, he began at age 16 to study medicine under Richard Bayley in New York; he practiced medicine until 1787.

Moore married Christian Jones (1769 - April 20, 1796) of New York in 1784, who bore him five children. After her death he married Sarah Mersereau of Staten Island on March 23, 1797, who bore him six more before dying in August 1824. Bishop Samuel Provoost ordained him to the diaconate in July, 1787, at St. George's Church. In September 1787 he was admitted to the priesthood. He was rector of Grace Church in Rye, New York, until 1788. He then served as rector of St. Andrew's, Staten Island (1789–1809), St. Stephen's, New York (1809–1814), and Monumental Church, Richmond, Virginia, from October 1814 until November 1841. St. Stephens had about thirty families when he arrived, and more than four hundred communicants when he resigned.

Moore was a delegate to the May, 1808, General Convention where he served on a committee that added to the hymnal He was president of the Virginia branch of the American Bible Society. He led the diocese during the formation of the Virginia Theological Seminary.

Moore was elected bishop of the Diocese of Virginia, succeeding James Madison, and consecrated May 18, 1814, in St. James's Church, Philadelphia. Richard Channing Moore was the 14th bishop consecrated in the Episcopal Church. The Diocese of Virginia was extremely weak when Moore became bishop. During his tenure it strengthened greatly, with a major increase in clergy and membership.

Moore died in Lynchburg, Virginia while visiting parishes in the diocese, and is buried at Hollywood Cemetery, Richmond, Virginia.

=== Consecrators ===
- The Most Reverend William White, fourth presiding bishop of the Episcopal Church
- The Right Reverend John Henry Hobart, third bishop of New York
- The Right Reverend Alexander Viets Griswold, bishop of the Eastern Diocese

Episcopal Church (USA) titles
Preceded by James Madison	2nd Bishop of Virginia; 1814 – 1841	Succeeded by William Meade
