= African Episcopal Church of St. Thomas =

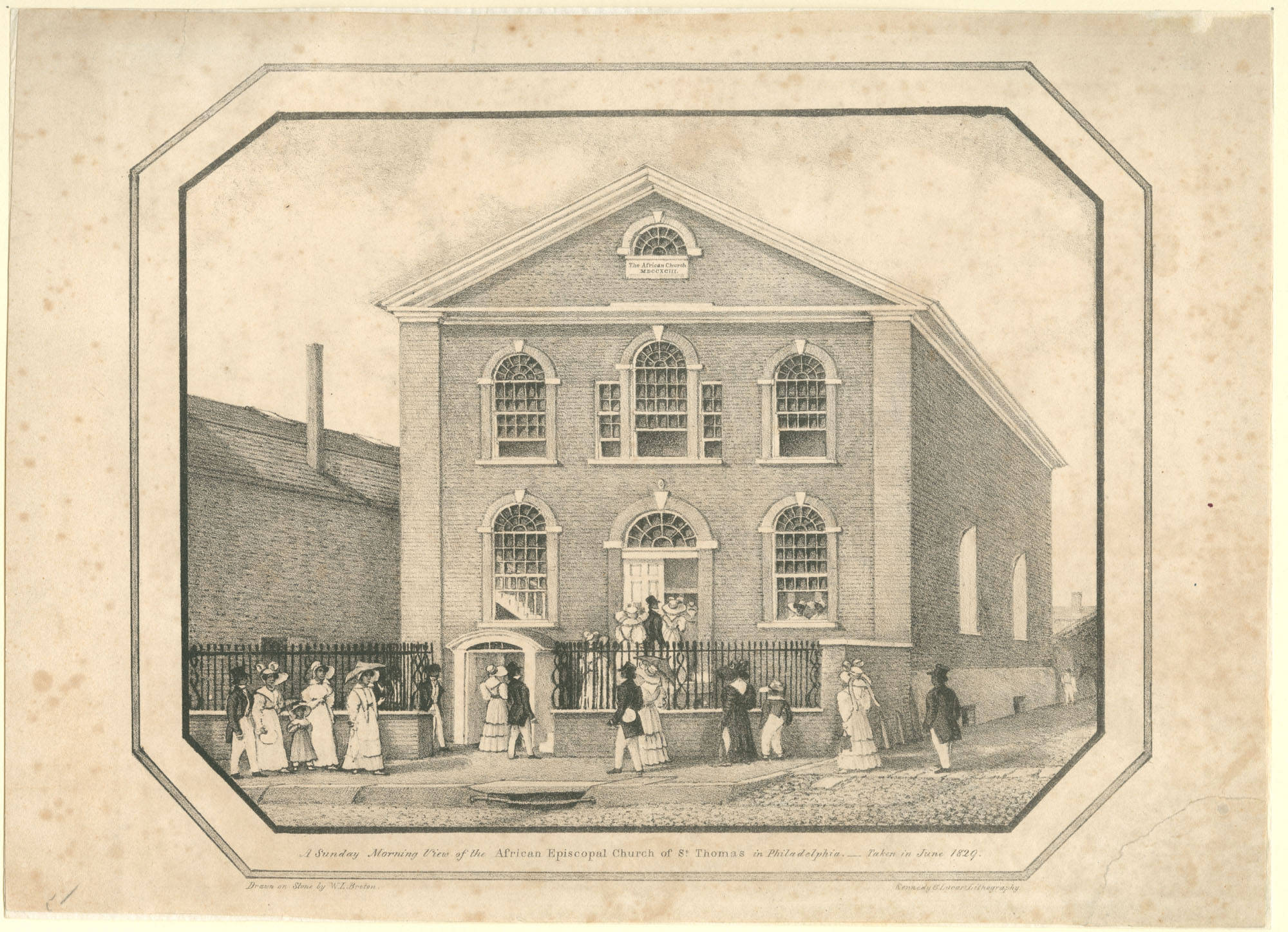
- African Episcopal Church of St. Thomas (1829), lithograph by William L. Breton.
- African Episcopal Church of St. Thomas
- Location: Philadelphia, Pennsylvania
- Country: United States
- Denomination: Episcopal
- Website: About St. Thomas

History
- Founded: 1792
- Founder: Absalom Jones

Administration
- Diocese: Episcopal Diocese of Pennsylvania

The African Episcopal Church of St. Thomas (AECST) was founded in 1792 in Philadelphia, Pennsylvania, as the first black Episcopal Church in the United States. Its congregation developed from the Free African Society, a non-denominational group formed by black people who had left St. George's Methodist Church because of discrimination and segregation by class. They were led by Absalom Jones, a free black and lay Methodist preacher. As his congregation became established, he was ordained in 1802 by Presiding Bishop William White as the first black priest in the Episcopal Church. Bishop White also ordained William Levington as a deacon at this church, although he soon became a missionary in the South, establishing St. James Church in Baltimore in 1824.

The congregation remains within the Episcopal Diocese of Pennsylvania. The church moved several times over the years in response to the needs of the congregation, including where the majority of the worshiping community resided. In spite of that, it has remained in constant operations since its founding.

St. Thomas became a leading institution in Philadelphia's black cultural life.

Its second rector was William Douglass, an African American, former student of Rev. Levington, and an abolitionist. Clergy and parishioners were active in the Underground Railroad in the 19th century. Henry L. Phillips served as the church's interim rector for six months during the mid-1870s and as ninth rector from 1912 to 1914. Clergy and parishioners also participated in the modern Civil Rights Movement in the mid-20th century.

St. Thomas was the first black church in the country to purchase a pipe organ, and the first to hire a black woman organist, Ann Appo. Other notable organists were John C. Bowers and his brother, Thomas J. Bowers.

== Location ==
While the congregation has worshipped in several different buildings, it has remained continuously active since its founding. The site of the original building, dedicated on July 17, 1794, at Fifth and Adelphi streets, is now covered by the passageway/plaza known as St. James Place. It also worshipped for a time on Twelfth Street south of Walnut Street, before following changing demographics and moving out of the downtown area to West Philadelphia, where the congregation worshipped at 57th and Pearl streets, and 52nd and Parrish streets. It then moved to Philadelphia's Overbrook Farms neighborhood, where it currently worships at a church at the intersection of Overbrook and Lancaster avenues

== See also ==
- History of African Americans in Philadelphia
