= Thomas John Claggett =

American bishop (1743–1816)

The Right Reverend Thomas John Claggett
- Bishop of Maryland
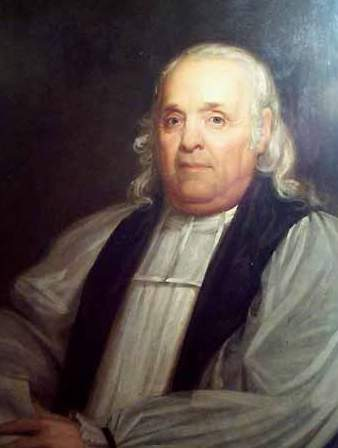
- Church: Episcopal Church
- Diocese: Maryland
- Elected: May 31, 1792
- In office: 1792–1816
- Successor: James Kemp

Orders
- Ordination: October 11, 1767 by Richard Terrick
- Consecration: September 17, 1792 by Samuel Provoost

Personal details
- Born: October 2, 1743 Nottingham, Province of Maryland
- Died: August 2, 1816 (aged 72) Croom, Maryland, United States
- Buried: Washington National Cathedral
- Denomination: Anglican
- Parents: Samuel Clagett & Elizabeth Gantt
- Spouse: Mary Gantt
- Children: 5

Thomas John Claggett (October 2, 1743 – August 2, 1816) was the first bishop of the newly formed American Episcopal Church to be consecrated on American soil and the first bishop of the recently established (1780) Diocese of Maryland.

== Early family life ==
Thomas Claggett, born October 2, 1743, was the son of the Reverend Samuel Clagett, an Anglican priest of the Church of England from Charles County, Maryland, and Elizabeth Gantt. He was the great-grandson of Captain Thomas Clagett who emigrated from England and settled on St. Leonard's Creek in Calvert County, Maryland in 1671. His paternal grandmother was Deborah, daughter of Hon. John Dorsey, widow of Charles Ridgely I, and mother to Charles Ridgely II.

Captain Clagett at one time owned more than 3,700 acres (15 km^{2}) in central and northeastern Maryland in Calvert, Prince George's, Baltimore and Kent Counties. He was a Justice and Coroner of Calvert County and an opponent of Maryland Governor John Coode, (1648-1709), who was a leader of Coode's Rebellion (also known as the "Protestant Rebellion" in 1689 against the Lord Proprietor of the Province of Maryland, the third Lord Baltimore, Charles Calvert, [1637-1715]). Thomas John Claggett was the first to use the double "g" in spelling his family's name.

== Education ==
After Claggett's father died in 1756 when he was 14, he was placed in the care of his maternal uncle, the Rev. Dr. John Eversfield. Eversfield was the "historically conspicuous" rector of St. Paul's Parish Church in Prince George's County, Maryland. Three years later Thomas Clagett began attending public school and enrolled at the Lower Marlboro Academy in Lower Marlboro, Maryland, founded by Eversfield on his plantation around 1745. Many of the youth in southern Maryland were educated at Eversfield's school. Claggett later served the parish from 1778 to 1780 and succeeded his uncle until 1786.

In 1762, at age 17, he entered the College of New Jersey (now known as Princeton University). He graduated on 25 September 1764 and received theological training from Dr. Eversfield for the next three years. In 1787 Princeton conferred on him the Master of Arts degree, and in 1792, after he was consecrated as the first American Episcopal bishop, he was awarded the honorary Doctor of Divinity from Washington College in Chestertown, Maryland on the state's Eastern Shore, where the Diocese had been formed twelve years before in 1780.

== Ministry ==
On 20 September 1767, while visiting in Great Britain, Claggett was made an ordained deacon in the chapel of Fulham Palace, by the then Bishop of London, Dr. Richard Terrick. Less than a month later, on 11 October 1767at the same place and by the same prelate, Thomas Claggett was made a priest. Rev. Claggett remained in England for about three more months, studying and visiting family. In the spring of 1768, he returned home, and was appointed as the Rector of All Saints' Church of Sunderland, Calvert County, Maryland.

=== Maryland priest ===
The American Revolutionary War created tremendous conflicts within the Church of England in the Thirteen Colonies. The clergy, who had been ordained in England, had taken an oath of allegiance to the king. Soon after the Declaration of Independence, the clergy were required to sign an "Oath of Fidelity", which none felt they could sign without violating their ordination vows. Nine of the clergy gave up their congregations and returned to England, six moved to Virginia, one to Pennsylvania, one to Delaware, five retired to their estates, and two or three others took up teaching. Starting July 4, 1776, Congress and several newly independent states passed laws making prayers for the king and British Parliament acts of treason. By 1779 the numbers of Anglican clergy in the area dwindled from 53 to just 15. Divisions and conflict arose among largely "loyalist" clergy and overwhelmingly "patriot" parishioners.

Claggett avoided the conflict, retiring as rector and living on his estate of Croom in Prince George's County for two years. In 1778, he began officiating in his local home parish at St. Paul's, in Baden, of Prince George's County where he became rector on August 7, 1780, succeeding to the office after the death of his uncle, Rev. Dr. John Eversfield. Rev. Claggett remained there until 1786. Due to the severe shortage of priests after disestablishment, Rev. Claggett was also the second rector of Christ Episcopal Church, Guilford, Maryland from 1781 to 1782. In 1786, Rev. Claggett accepted the rectorship at St. James' Church (formerly Herring Creeke Church) at Tracy's Landing (now near Lothian) in Anne Arundel County.

=== Organization of American Church ===
Following the Revolutionary War, the Rev. William Smith was elected bishop of the Maryland diocese, but the Bishop of London refused to consecrate Smith. Unable to obtain consecration of their clergy from the Church of England, representatives from nine dioceses already organized met in Philadelphia in 1789 to form an independent Anglican church in America and to ratify a constitution for its governance.

In 1789 the Anglican congregations in nine states adopted the name of the "Protestant Episcopal Church in the United States of America" as their name and formally separated themselves from the Church of England. Using the term "Episcopal" emphasized their belief and usage of the historical succession by the "laying-on-of-hands" of the "Episcopacy" and the "episcopate" rather than the descriptive term "Anglican" which emphasized their English origins and the mother church of the Church of England, much like the Scottish Episcopal Church from which the American church's first bishop, Samuel Seabury was consecrated.

The American Episcopal Church was incorporated as "the first Anglican Province outside the British Isles." At the time, in 1783, there were 47 parishes and about 38 clergy in the new first Diocese.

== Episcopacy ==
Coat of Arms of Thomas John Claggett

"Being a man of excellent fitness for the office, as well as possessed of large private means," Claggett was elected the first Bishop of Maryland, and consecrated during the triennial General Convention (synod) of the Episcopal Church at Trinity Church on Wall Street in New York City on 17 September 1792. Thomas J. Claggett thus became the first bishop of The Episcopal Church ordained and consecrated in North America and the fifth Bishop consecrated for the Episcopal (formerly Anglican) Church in the United States.

Claggett was consecrated by four men who had been consecrated by the Bishop of London, and later presiding bishops of the Episcopal Church. They were:

- Samuel Seabury, second Presiding Bishop and first Bishop of Connecticut. Seabury had received his episcopal orders from the non-juring Scottish bishops of the Anglican Church in Scotland who consecrated him in Aberdeen on November 14, 1784.
- William White, first and fourth Presiding Bishop (term used in lieu of "archbishop") and first Bishop of Pennsylvania.
- Samuel Provoost, third Presiding Bishop of the Episcopal Church and first Bishop of New York.
- Bishop James Madison of Virginia also assisted with the consecration. Traditionally only three bishops are required, but Provoost objected to Seabury's consecration by Scottish non-jurors, so no further consecrations took place in the United States until Madison went to England and was consecrated again by the prelates of the Church of England as a bishop.

=== New capital city ===
The first priest (presbyter) that Bishop Claggett ordained was the Rev. Walter Dulaney Addison, who first served in Queen Anne Parish in Upper Marlboro, Maryland from 1793 to 1795 (succeeding his Tory uncle, Rev. Jonathan Boucher who had returned to England as well as financed his nephew's education), then became rector of King George's Parish succeeding Rev. Henry T. Addison. This parish included not only the Addison family's traditional estates near Oxon Hill, Maryland and much of Prince George's County, Maryland but also a few Episcopalian families the new District of Columbia. Thus, Rev. Walter D. Addison periodically held services in what soon became Rock Creek Church as well as in the local Presbyterian Church on "M" Street through the hospitality of the minister, the Rev. Stephen B. Balch. From this, Georgetown Parish formed in 1809 and St. John's Episcopal Church, Lafayette Square in 1815. Bishop Claggett and Rev. Walter Addison also became mentors of several important Episcopal priests in the new capital area, including Rev. William Holland Wilmer and future bishop William Meade in Alexandria, Virginia.

Bishop Claggett was among the first to envision the need for a national Episcopal Church in the nation's new capital and "Federal City", now often being referred to as "Washington City", after the first new president in 1793, as the town was being laid out. While presiding over his Diocesan convention that year, Claggett appointed a committee to study the idea. He had an ally in Joseph Nourse, the country's First Registrar of the Treasury. However, Nourse did not want the cathedral in downtown Washington, but even then foresaw the beautiful dominating hill-top of Mount Alban to the northwest overlooking the new rough city and the Potomac River valley. After years of controversy and discussion with debates about its location, construction of the Cathedral Church of St. Peter and St. Paul, the Washington National Cathedral on Mount Saint Alban was eventually begun in 1897, and mostly completed by the 1980s, testifying to its founders' and visionaries' original conceptions. Memorial slabs recognizing Bishop Claggett and his wife are mounted in the basement outside the chapel dedicated to St. Joseph of Arimathea.

=== United States Senate chaplain ===
On November 27, 1800, the United States Senate at its first session in the new north (Senate) wing, of a barely serviceable Capitol building selected the Right Reverend Claggett as its third chaplain. He gave the opening prayer, the first offered in the new Capitol in Washington D.C. He served through the end of the session.

His first group of confirmations, a class of forty-four, took place in 1793 at St. John's Church at Broad Creek, near today's Fort Washington overlooking the Potomac River, in Prince George's County a few months after his consecration, and were presented by the then third rector, the Rev. Joseph Messenger.

=== Trinity Episcopal Church ===
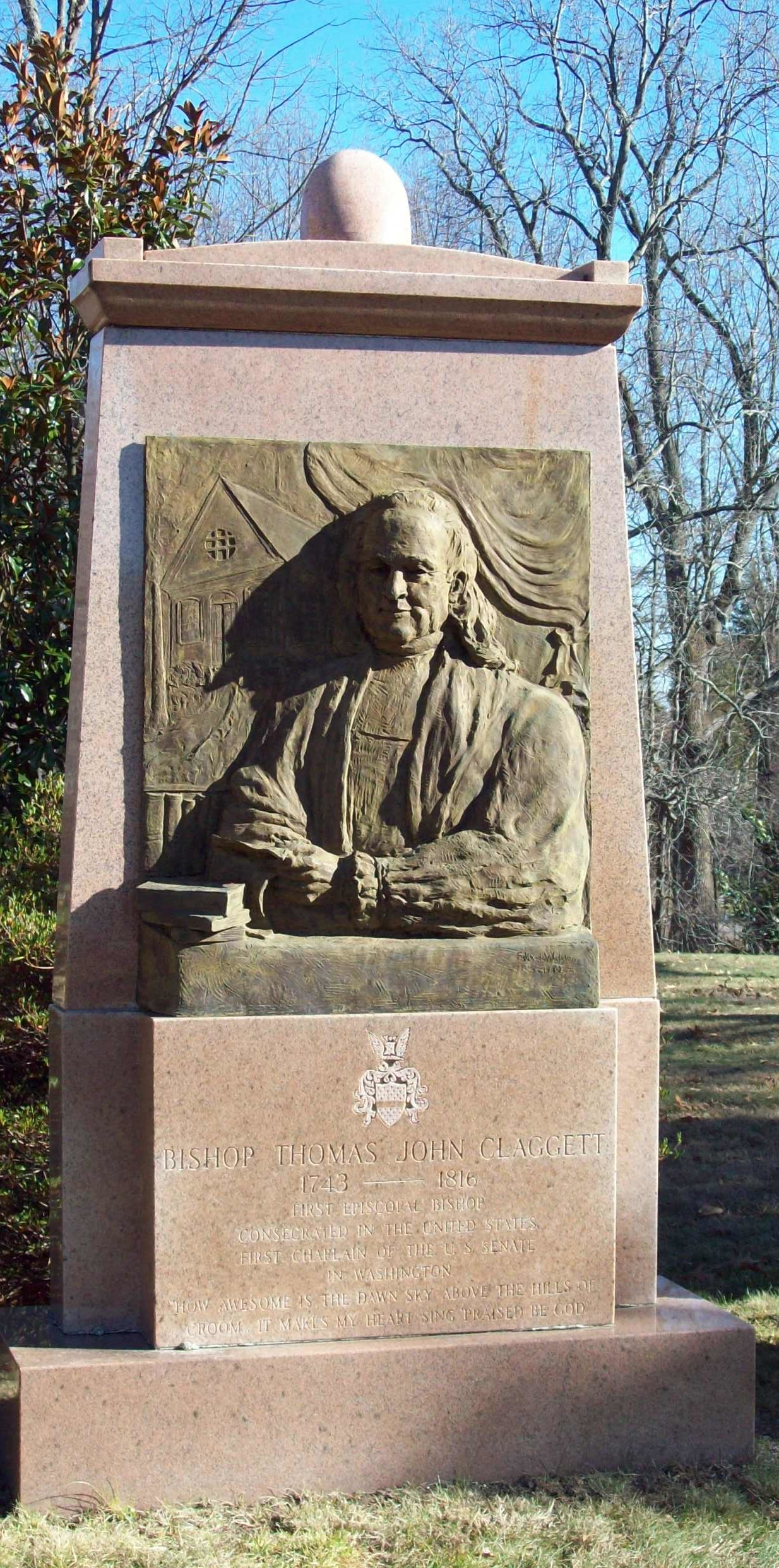
Memorial in St. Thomas Church to Thomas John Claggett.

In 1810, members of the church in Upper Marlboro, Maryland founded Trinity Episcopal Church so they could worship near their homes. The nearest existing Anglican churches were St. Thomas Church in Upper Marlboro and St. Barnabas' Church in Leeland, both long carriage rides over rough and often impassible roads.

On August 13, 1810, the newly formed Trinity Church Vestry elected the Right Rev. Thomas John Claggett as the first rector. He organized the congregation in an abandoned wooden Presbyterian building built 106 years earlier in 1704. During the War of 1812, notes from the vestry minutes of May 1814 describe British troops camping in the church and preventing the Vestry from meeting. Rev. Clagget served as the congregation's rector until his death on August 3, 1816.

=== Other congregations ===
On October 16, 1811, Claggett consecrated the replacement structure at Christ Church, also known as the "Old Brick Church", in Queen Caroline Parish, western Anne Arundel County (now town/city of Columbia in Howard County). On January 9, 1814, due to Bishop Madison's death without a successor, Bishop Claggett consecrated a rebuilt Christ Church in Alexandria, Virginia (home parish of General and President George Washington, (1732-1799)).

An assistant bishop, James Kemp was appointed to assist Bishop Claggett in 1814, and succeeded him two years later. Bishop Claggett published a few sermons, pastoral letters, and addresses to his convention.

== Death and burial ==
Epitaph
Latin	English
Maryland Episcopus Primus; Natus Sexto Nonis Octobris; Anno Salutis; 1743; Ordinatus Diaconus et Presbyter; Londini; 1767; Et Episcopus Consecratus; 1792; Decessit in place Christi; Quarto Nonis Agusti; 1816; Fidelitate et Mansuetudine; Ecclesiam Rexit; Moribusque; Ornavit; Uxori, Liberis, Sociisque memoriam Clarissimam; Et Patraiae et Ecclesiae nomen Honoratum Dedit	Thomas John Claggett, D.D., First Bishop of Maryland, Born October 2, 1744; Ordained Deacon and Presbyter; In London, 1767. Consecrated Bishop, 1792; Departed in the Peace of Christ, August 3, 1816, He ruled the church with firmness and faithfulness and adorned in by his character. He left a beloved memory to his wife, his children and his friends and honored name to his country and the church.

Claggett died August 4, 1816, at Croome, in Croom, Maryland, his family home, which burned on December 25 of 1856 or 1858. Originally interred in the family plot on the property, his remains were moved in 1898 to the Washington National Cathedral, then beginning construction the year before where a wood carving of his consecration was added to the bishop's stall. There is a marker and memorial bell tower at St. Thomas Episcopal Church, in Croom, of Prince George's County, Maryland. Many of his papers are housed at the Diocese of Maryland's archives.

Claggett's epitaph, which includes the dates of his ordinations, was penned by his friend and fellow churchman, lawyer-poet Francis Scott Key, (1779-1843), author of the "Star Spangled Banner".

== In popular culture ==
The Diocese of Maryland in Frederick County built a summer camp and later retreat center known as the "Claggett Center". It serves the recreational, physical education, and spiritual needs of young Episcopalians. It is also a retreat and conference center for members and guests of the Church and Diocese.

St. James School outside Hagerstown in Washington County, built a large boys dormitory they named "Claggett Hall". It also contains offices for the headmaster, admissions, and business divisions, and a common dining room.

== See also ==
- Succession of Bishops of the Episcopal Church in the United States
- Utley, George Burwell. (1876–1946). The Life and Times of Thomas John Claggett, First Bishop of Maryland and the First Bishop Consecrated in America (Chicago: R. R. Donnelley & Sons Co., 1913)

Episcopal Church (USA) titles
Preceded by (none)	1st Bishop of Maryland; 1792 – 1816	Succeeded by James Kemp
Preceded by William White	3rd US Senate Chaplain; November 27, 1800 – December 8, 1801	Succeeded by Edward Gantt
