= William White (bishop of Pennsylvania) =

American Episcopal bishop (1748–1836)

The Most Reverend William White
- 1st and 4th Presiding Bishop of the Episcopal Church
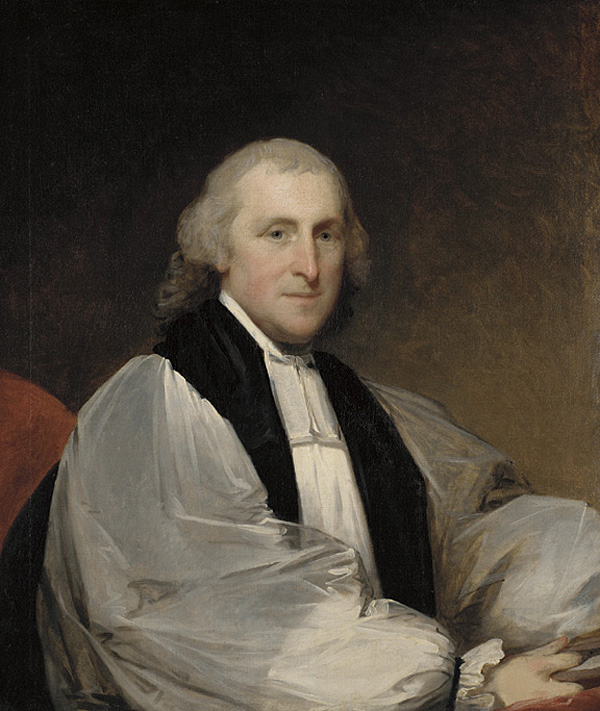
- Church: Episcopal Church
- In office: July 28, 1789 – October 3, 1789; September 8, 1795 – July 17, 1836
- Predecessor: None (1st); Samuel Provoost (2nd)
- Successor: Samuel Seabury (1st); Alexander Viets Griswold (2nd)
- Other post: Bishop of Pennsylvania (1787–1836)
- Previous post: Bishop of Delaware (1787-1828)

Orders
- Ordination: December 23, 1770, Chapel Royal (deacon); April 17, 1772, Chapel Royal (priest) by Philip Yonge (deacon); Richard Terrick (priest)
- Consecration: February 4, 1787, Lambeth Palace Chapel by John Moore (Canterbury) et al.; see #Consecrators

Personal details
- Born: April 4, 1748 Philadelphia, Province of Pennsylvania
- Died: July 17, 1836 (aged 88) Philadelphia, Pennsylvania, United States
- Buried: Christ Church, Philadelphia
- Denomination: Anglican
- Parents: Thomas White & Esther Hewlings Newman
- Spouse: Mary Harrison
- Education: College of Philadelphia predecessor to University of Pennsylvania

Sainthood
- Feast day: 17 July
- Venerated in: Episcopal Church, Anglican Church in North America
- Title as Saint: Bishop of Pennsylvania and First Presiding Bishop of the Church in the USA
- Shrines: Christ Church, Philadelphia

Ordination history of William White
History
Diaconal ordination
- Ordained by: Philip Yonge, (Norwich)
- Date: 23 December 1770
- Place: Chapel Royal, St James's Palace, London
Priestly ordination
- Ordained by: Richard Terrick, (London)
- Date: 17 April 1772
- Place: Chapel Royal, St James's Palace, London
Episcopal consecration
- Principal consecrator: John Moore, (Canterbury)
- Co-consecrators: William Markham (York); Charles Moss (Bath and Wells); John Hinchliffe (Peterborough)
- Date: 4 February 1787
- Place: Lambeth Palace Chapel, London
Episcopal succession
Bishops consecrated by William White as principal consecrator
- Robert Smith: 13 September 1795
- Edward Bass: 7 May 1797
- Abraham Jarvis: 18 October 1797
- Benjamin Moore: 11 September 1801
- Samuel Parker: 14 September 1804
- John Henry Hobart: 29 May 1811
- Alexander Viets Griswold: 29 May 1811
- Theodore Dehon: 15 October 1812
- Richard Channing Moore: 18 May 1814
- James Kemp: 1 September 1814
- John Croes: 19 November 1815
- Nathaniel Bowen: 8 October 1818
- Philander Chase: 11 February 1819
- Thomas Church Brownell: 27 October 1819
- John Stark Ravenscroft: 22 May 1823
- Henry Ustick Onderdonk: 25 October 1827
- William Meade: 19 August 1829
- William Murray Stone: 21 October 1830
- Benjamin Treadwell Onderdonk: 26 November 1830
- Levi Silliman Ives: 22 September 1831
- John Henry Hopkins: 31 October 1832
- Benjamin Bosworth Smith: 31 October 1832
- Charles Pettit McIlvaine: 31 October 1832
- George Washington Doane: 31 October 1832
- James Hervey Otey: 14 January 1834
- Jackson Kemper: 25 September 1835

William White (April 4, 1748 N.S. – July 17, 1836) was the first and fourth Presiding Bishop of the Episcopal Church of the United States (1789; 1795–1836), the first bishop of the Diocese of Pennsylvania (1787–1836), and the second United States Senate Chaplain (appointed December 9, 1790). He also served as the first and fourth President of the House of Deputies for the General Convention of the Episcopal Church (1785, 1789).

== Education and ordination ==
Born in Philadelphia, White began his education at College of Philadelphia (which was later known as the University of Pennsylvania), taking his B.A. in 1765 and his A.M. about three years later. In 1770, he sailed for England on the ship Britannia, for his ordination as deacon by Philip Yonge, Bishop of Norwich (but with the authorisation of Richard Terrick, Bishop of London), which took place in the Chapel Royal at St James's Palace on December 23, 1770. He returned to England twice: once in 1772, to be ordained priest (again at the Chapel Royal, by Terrick on April 17), and again in 1787, when he was consecrated bishop on February 4 at Lambeth Palace Chapel by John Moore, Archbishop of Canterbury; William Markham, Archbishop of York; Charles Moss, Bishop of Bath and Wells; and John Hinchliffe, Bishop of Peterborough. In 1781, after further theological studies, he received a Doctor of Divinity degree from the University of Pennsylvania.

=== Consecrators ===
- John Moore, Archbishop of Canterbury
- William Markham, Archbishop of York
- Charles Moss, Bishop of Bath and Wells
- John Hinchliffe, Bishop of Peterborough

William White was the second bishop consecrated for the Episcopal Church of the United States. Samuel Seabury of Connecticut had been first, consecrated in 1784 in Aberdeen, Scotland.

== Ministry ==
Rector of St. Peter's and of Christ Church for 57 years, White also served as Chaplain of the Continental Congress from 1777 to 1789, and subsequently as Chaplain of the Senate.

Though an Anglican (Episcopalian) cleric who was sworn to the king in his ordination ceremony, White, like all but one of his fellow Anglican clerics in Philadelphia, sided with the American revolutionary cause. After the war, White wrote The Case of the Episcopal Churches in the United States Considered, a pamphlet that laid out the foundational thinking for the emerging Episcopal Church. Among the innovations he proposed (and which were eventually adopted) was including lay people in the church's decision making bodies. Thus, at the founding General Convention of the Episcopal Church in 1785, the House of Deputies was composed of both lay and clergy members. After his consecration in England, White helped create an American episcopate, participating in the consecration of Thomas John Clagett as Bishop of Maryland at the General Convention in 1792, as well as serving as the Episcopal Church's first and fourth Presiding Bishop (the latter time as the most senior of bishops, as became the custom for the next century). White participated in the consecration of most American Episcopal bishops during the country's first two decades. He also ordained two African-Americans as deacons and then priests, Absalom Jones of Philadelphia (in 1795 and 1804, respectively), and William Levington of New York (who became missionary to free and enslaved African Americans in the South and established St.James Episcopal Church in Baltimore circa 1824). Although White did not travel extensively through his diocese, he did support missionary priests, including: Simon Wilmer, who traveled through Pennsylvania and New Jersey and ultimately settled down in what became the Maryland suburbs of Washington D.C.); William Meade, who traveled extensively throughout Virginia and ultimately became its bishop, White participating in his consecration; and Jackson Kemper, first in Philadelphia for 2 decades, founded the Society for the Advancement of Christianity and became the Episcopal Church's first missionary bishop. The elderly White made only one trip to the western parts of his diocese. In 1825 he traveled with Kemper to western Pennsylvania confirming 212 and consecrating buildings in Pittsburgh, Brownsville and Greensburg. On that trip, with permission of Richard Channing Moore, Bishop of Virginia, he also visited Wheeling, West Virginia in what much later became West Virginia to confirm parishioners and consecrate St. Matthew's Church. White also took an active role in creating several charitable and educational institutions, usually by organizing Presbyterians, Methodists and other Protestants in those philanthropic enterprises. In 1785, White founded the Episcopal Academy, to educate the sons of Philadelphia's Episcopalians and others. In 1795, White raised funds to create a school (built on Race Street between 4th and 5th) for black and Native American children. He also helped to create a Magdalen Society in Philadelphia in 1800 for "unhappy females who have been seduced from the paths of virtue and are desirous of returning to a life of rectitude." This was the first institution of this kind in the United States.

In 1820, White joined prominent Philadelphia philanthropists who, in 1820, convinced the Pennsylvania legislature to fund the Pennsylvania Institution for the Deaf and Dumb, founded by rabbi David G. Seixas, now known as the Pennsylvania School for the Deaf. White served as the school's president for the next 16 years. He also ministered to Philadelphia's prisoners, becoming the first president of the Philadelphia Society for the Alleviation of Miseries of Public Prisons, which attracted the participation of numerous Quakers. Not known for his oratory (but for quiet sardonic wit), White earned Philadelphians' esteem for his erudition and ongoing charitable works, especially during the multiple outbreaks of yellow fever in that city throughout the 1790s. White and his friend and neighbor Benjamin Rush were among the few prominent citizens who remained to tend the ill when many other wealthy inhabitants fled to the countryside.

As White aged, arranging for his successor became divisive in the diocese. Benjamin Allen arrived from Virginia to lead the diocese's most evangelical congregation, St. Paul's; he also founded another congregation, St. Andrew's, without White's permission. White questioned certain aspects of lay leadership at the revival meetings. Allen and the evangelical party selected George Boyd to replace White's assistant James Abercrombie, and Allen in place of Kemper at the diocesan council. When they tried to elect Meade as White's coadjutor (assistant bishop with right of succession) over White's preferred candidate (Bird Wilson, a professor at General Theological Seminary but canonically resident in Pennsylvania), the diocesan convention ended in a deadlock. At the next Convention, Wilson took himself out of contention, as did Meade, and the divided delegates eventually selected Henry Onderdonk (of Brooklyn, New York; who preferred High Church practices but had also revitalized that congregation).

White was a member of the American Philosophical Society, along with many other prominent Philadelphians, including Benjamin Franklin, as well as a trustee of the University of Pennsylvania from 1774 until his death. During his tenure as trustee, he also served as Treasurer (1775–1778) and President (1790–1791) of the board of trustees.

== Family connections and private life ==
Coat of Arms of William White

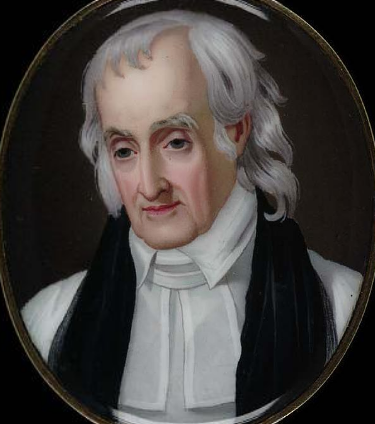
White in about 1830

White was married to Mary Harrison (1750–1797). Mary's father, Henry Harrison, had also been the Mayor of Philadelphia from 1762 to 1763. The Whites had eight children, only three of whom survived to adulthood. As a widower, White supported seven of his grandchildren. In 1813, the bishop's widowed daughter Elizabeth brought her two daughters to live in the house. Elizabeth, called "Betsy" by the family, managed the household for nearly twenty years until her death in 1831. After the death of the Whites' son-in-law and daughter Mary, White and Betsy brought his five grandchildren (through Mary) into his home where they lived for the ten years leading up to his death.

White's younger sister Mary was married to Robert Morris, who was known as the "Financier of the Revolution" for securing funding for the colonial cause.

White's household included a free African American coachman, named John, but no slaves.

A lengthy obituary devoted to White in the National Gazette and Literary Register described him thus:

... [T]he duties of the several important relations in which he stood to society were performed with undeviating correctness and suavity; he possessed the rare merit of winning the respect and love of an entire community to which he was an ornament and a blessing. His piety was deep and unfeigned; his walking humble yet dignified; his acquirements profound; in his mind the welfare of the Christian church was always the prominent consideration ... He was one of those examples of steady virtue sent upon earth by Divine providence, as if to prove how near the great pattern of perfection it is permitted to approach.

White died at his home after a lingering illness, retaining his full mental faculties until the end. He was buried in the family vault at Christ Church Burial Ground on July 20, 1836, next to his brother-in-law, Robert Morris. On December 23, 1870, his remains were re-interred in the chancel of Christ Church.

== Bishop White House ==
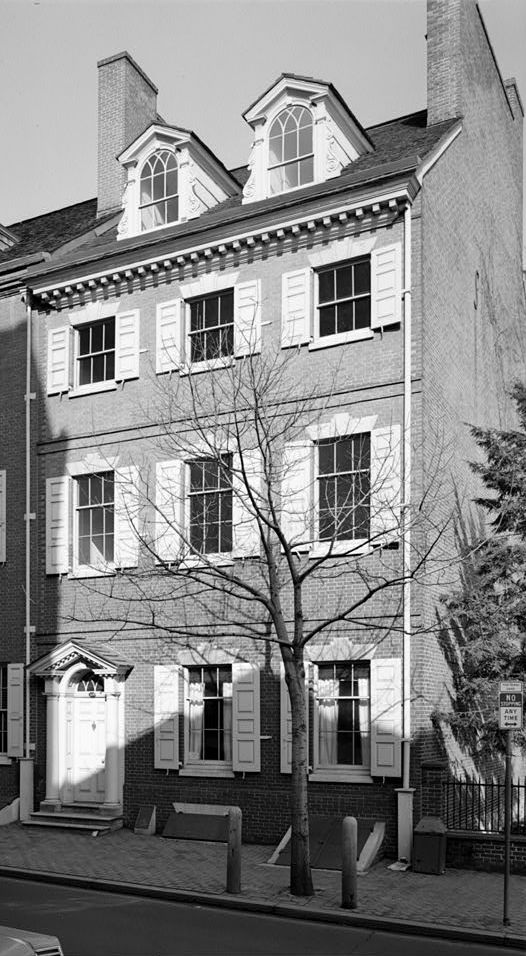
Bishop William White House

His home at 309 Walnut Street in Philadelphia is today part of Independence National Historical Park. It is notable, in part, as one of the first houses to have an indoor "necessary," at a time when most privies were built outside of houses. The prominent physician Benjamin Rush lived next door.

A second Bishop White House is located on Old Mill Lane, in the Historic District in Rose Valley, Pennsylvania. White sent his family to this house in 1793, during the Philadelphia yellow fever epidemic. Though his family lived there and he visited the house, White generally remained in Philadelphia.

== Veneration ==
White is honored with a feast day on the liturgical calendar of the Episcopal Church (USA) and the Anglican Church in North American on July 17.

The Bishop White Prayer Book Society was named for White in 1834. The Bishop White Parish Library Association was named for White in 1865.

== Quotes ==
In White's response of August 15, 1835 to Colonel Mercer of Fredericksburg, Virginia, he writes:

In regard to the subject of your inquiry, truth requires me to say that General Washington never received the communion in the churches of which I am the parochial minister. Mrs. Washington was an habitual communicant ... I have been written to by many on that point, and have been obliged to answer them as I now do you.

This letter is one piece of evidence among many which are frequently cited in support of Washington's deist or even atheist beliefs. Although Washington never received communion there, he attended services at Christ Church regularly for about 25 years.

== See also ==
- List of presiding bishops of the Episcopal Church in the United States of America
- List of Episcopal bishops of the United States
- Historical list of the Episcopal bishops of the United States

Episcopal Church (USA) titles
| New title | Bishop of Pennsylvania; 1787–1836 | Succeeded by Henry Onderdonk |
| New title | Presiding Bishop of the Episcopal Church; 1st PB: July 28 – October 3, 1789; 4th PB: September 8, 1795 – July 17, 1836 | Succeeded by Samuel Seabury |
| Preceded by Samuel Provoost | Presiding Bishop of the Episcopal Church; 1st PB: July 28 – October 3, 1789; 4th PB: September 8, 1795 – July 17, 1836 | Succeeded by Alexander Viets Griswold |
| Preceded by Samuel Provoost | Chaplain of the United States Senate; December 9, 1790 – November 27, 1800 | Succeeded by Thomas John Claggett |
