= St. James Episcopal Church (Baltimore) =

St. James Episcopal Church, Lafayette Square
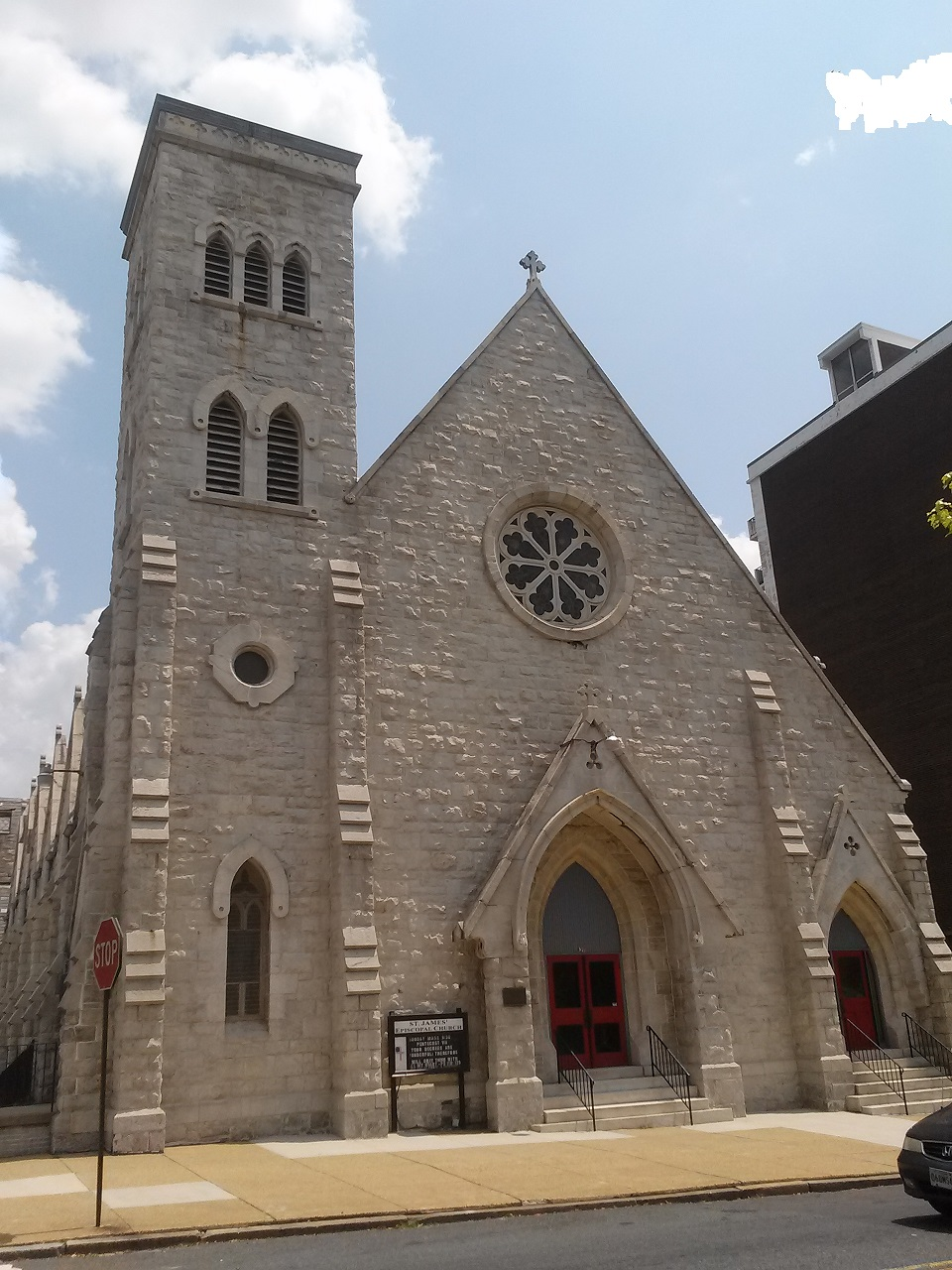
- St. James Episcopal Church, Lafayette Square
- 39.2990°N 76.6355°W
- Location: Corner of Lafayette and Arlington Avenues, Baltimore, Maryland, United States
- Denomination: Episcopal
- Churchmanship: Broad church

History
- Status: Parish church
- Founded: 1824
- Founder: The Rev. William Levington
- Dedication: St. James

Architecture
- Functional status: Active
- Heritage designation: Maryland landmark
- Designated: 1992
- Architectural type: Church
- Style: Gothic Revival
- Groundbreaking: 1866

Specifications
- Capacity: 300
- Materials: granite and sandstone

Administration
- Province: Third
- Diocese: Maryland
- Parish: St. James Parish

Clergy
- Rector: The Rev. Richard Dean Meadows, Jr.

St. James Episcopal Church Lafayette Square, or St. James African Episcopal Church, founded in 1824, is a historic Episcopal church now located at 1024 W. Lafayette Avenue in the Lafayette Square Historic District of Baltimore, Maryland.

In 2020, it reported 432 members, 95 average attendance, and plate and pledge income of $317,553. The church reported 217 members in 2023; no membership statistics were reported in 2024 parochial reports. Plate and pledge income reported for the congregation in 2024 was $380,756 with average Sunday attendance (ASA) of 101 persons.

== History ==
The historically African-American parish, the first Colored Episcopal Mission south of the Mason–Dixon line, was first organized and the Rev. William Levington held its first service in an "Upper Room" at Park Avenue and Marion Street on June 23, 1824. Only St. Philip's Episcopal Church in New York and St. Thomas Church in Philadelphia (where Levington was ordained) are older. The congregation moved several times under Levington, building a new church at North (now Guilford) and Saratoga Streets, which was dedicated on March 31, 1827. After his death, the congregation had a series of white ministers and lost its status as an independent parish.

The Rev. George Freeman Bragg, a historian of early African Episcopal congregations, became the congregation's rector in 1891 (by which time it had moved to Lexington and High Streets). He served 49 years until his death in 1940. In 1901 the congregation had grown such that they built and consecrated a new building at Park Avenue and Preston Street. By 1924 this parish was among the largest Black Episcopalian congregations in the country, with more than 500 parishioners. On Easter, 1932, the congregation held their first services in the current building, which it had bought from the white congregation, Church of the Ascension, which had moved to Middle River, Maryland.

The Rev. Donald Wilson served as rector from 1963 until his retirement in 1986, and oversaw significant changes in the neighborhood surrounding the parish. Under his leadership, the parish invested in the surrounding neighborhood, building the St. James Terrace Apartments in 1968.

In 1993, lightning struck the church and destroyed the rose window, among other significant damage, but Bishop Charles L. Longest reconsecrated the building on June 11, 1995. The congregation's next rector, Michael Bruce Curry (1988-2000), resigned to become Bishop of Episcopal Diocese of North Carolina. On May 1, 2015, the joint nominating committee for the election of the presiding bishop of the Episcopal Church nominated Curry and three other bishops as candidates for 27th presiding bishop and primate of the Episcopal Church. The election occurred on June 27, 2015, at the 78th General Convention meeting in Salt Lake City. Curry was elected by the House of Bishops, meeting in St. Mark's Cathedral, on the first ballot with 121 of 174 votes cast. Laity and clergy in the House of Deputies ratified Curry's election later the same day. Curry was installed as presiding bishop and primate on November 1, 2015, All Saints' Day, during a Eucharist at Washington National Cathedral. The service included readings in Spanish and Native American languages.

The next rector, Allen F. Robinson, served from 2002 to 2017. In 2008, the parish hosted the diocesan convention which elected Eugene Sutton as the first African American to become Bishop of the Diocese of Maryland.

The current Rector is the Rev. Richard D. Meadows, Jr. He has served as Priest-in-Charge since July 2018 and was elected Rector January 23, 2022.

The African American Rectors of St. James

- 1824 The Rev. William Levington
- 1957 The Rev. Harrison H. Webb
- 1891 The Rev. George F. Bragg
- 1940 The Rev. Cedric Mills
- 1963 The Rev. Donald O. Wilson
- 1988 The Rev. Michael B. Curry
- 2002 The Rev. Allen F. Robinson
- 2022 The Rev. Richard Dean Meadows, Jr., appointed Priest-in-Charge May 2019

== Architecture ==
According to the Maryland historic buildings survey, noteworthy features of this stone building include the stepped buttresses, pointed-arch entrances in the center and right, together with their stone hoods, the tower which suggests an Italian Romanesque campanile, the small ascending pointed windows including the bulls-eye window at the second level and the rose window above the entrance.
