= John Henry Hobart =

American bishop

The Right Reverend John Henry Hobart D.D.
- 3rd Bishop of New York
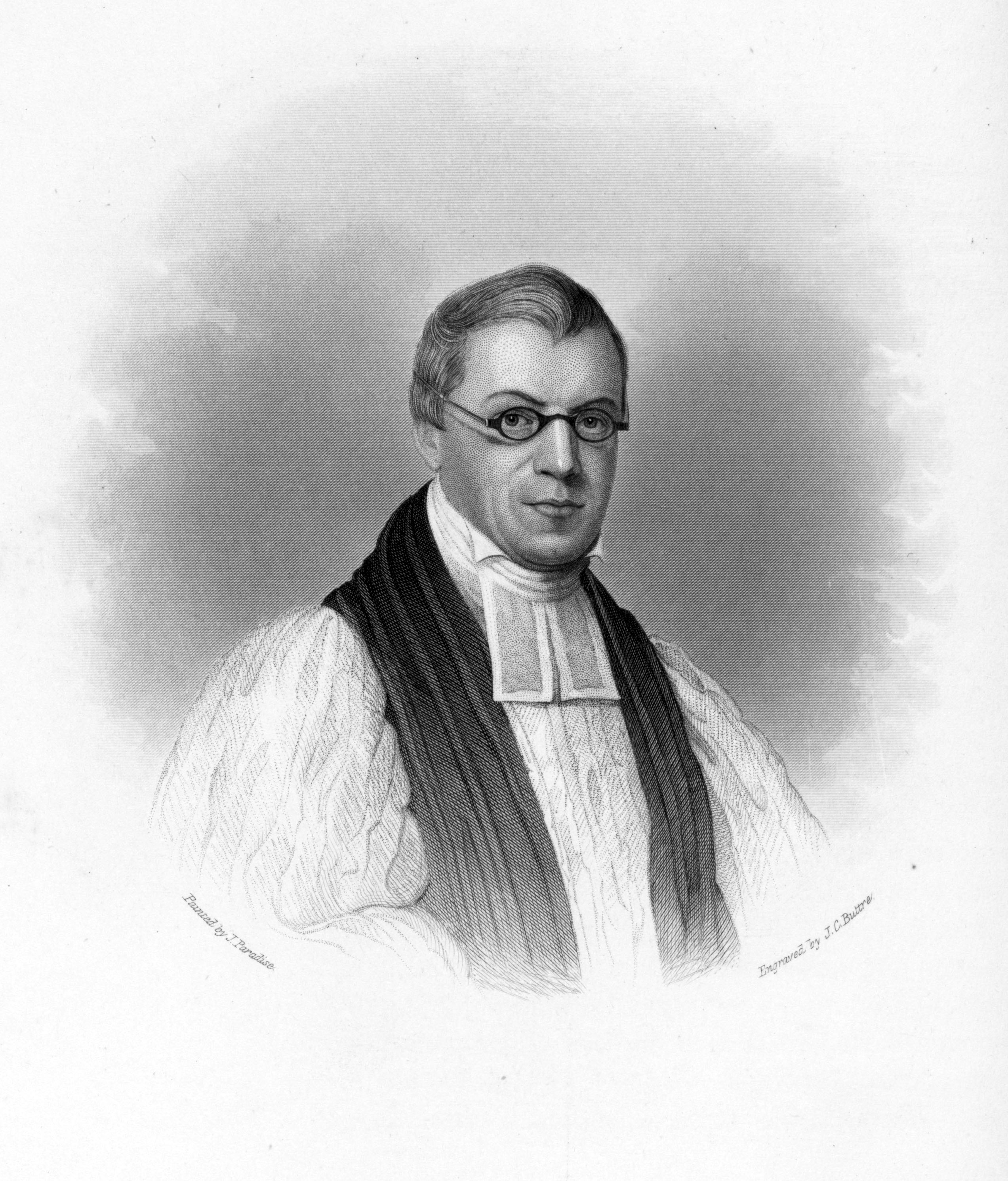
- Church: Episcopal Church
- Diocese: New York
- Elected: February 27, 1816
- In office: 1816–1830
- Predecessor: Benjamin Moore
- Successor: Benjamin T. Onderdonk
- Previous post: Assistant Bishop of New York (1811-1816)

Orders
- Ordination: April 5, 1801 (priest) by Samuel Provoost
- Consecration: May 29, 1811 by William White

Personal details
- Born: September 14, 1775 Philadelphia, Colony of Pennsylvania
- Died: September 12, 1830 (aged 54) Auburn, New York, United States
- Buried: Trinity Church Cemetery
- Denomination: Anglican
- Parents: Enoch Hobart & Hannah Pratt
- Spouse: Mary Goodwin Chandler
- Education: University of Pennsylvania (1790 - 1791) and College of New Jersey (1792 - 1796)

Sainthood
- Feast day: September 12
- Venerated in: Episcopal Church

John Henry Hobart (September 14, 1775 – September 12, 1830) was the third Episcopal bishop of New York (1816–1830). He vigorously promoted the extension of the Episcopal Church in upstate New York, as well as founded both the General Theological Seminary in New York City and Geneva College in Geneva in the Finger Lakes area (in 1852 renamed Hobart Free College after him and now operating as Hobart and William Smith Colleges). He was the beloved pastor of Elizabeth Seton before her conversion to Catholicism.

== Biography ==
=== Early life and family ===
John Henry Hobart was born in Philadelphia, Pennsylvania, Sept. 14, 1775; the son of Capt. Enoch and Hannah (Pratt) Hobart. His grandfather John Hobart had moved from Hingham, Massachusetts to Philadelphia, where he married a Swedish woman and became a member of the Anglican Church. His great-grandfather Peter Hobart was a graduate of the University of Cambridge, England, 1629, and teacher and pastor in Suffolk; he emigrated to America in 1635.

=== Education ===
Captain Hobart died when the future bishop was an infant, and was buried in the family tomb at Christ Church Burial Ground. At age nine, John was a pupil in the Episcopal Academy. He studied classics under professor John Andrews, 1785–90, and followed when his mentor became vice-provost of the University of Pennsylvania, which Hobart attended, 1790–91. He transferred to the junior class of the College of New Jersey (Princeton) and graduated, A.B., 1793, A.M., 1796. Hobart worked as a tutor at Princeton, 1797–98, while pursuing his studies in theology under the direction of Bishop William White.

=== Ministry ===
Hobart was ordained deacon by Bishop White in Philadelphia on June 3, 1798, and as a priest by Bishop Provoost on April 5, 1801, in Trinity Church. He then served as pastor of Trinity Church in Oxford and All Saints in Perkiomen Township, Pennsylvania before moving to New Jersey to serve at Christ Church, New Brunswick, New Jersey.

Trinity Church in New York hired Hobart as its assistant minister in 1803. Hobart showed his zeal for the historic episcopacy, An Apology for Apostolic Order and its Advocates in 1807, a series of letters to John M. Mason, who, in The Christian's Magazine, of which he was editor, had attacked the Episcopacy in general and in particular Hobart's collection of Essays on the Subject of Episcopacy (1806).

In 1811, Hobart was elected assistant bishop of New York, with the right of succession. The ill-health of Bishop Benjamin Moore led Hobart to effectively run the diocese for several years before formally succeeding on the latter's death in February 1816. As bishop, Hobart worked to build up his diocese, attempting to visit every parish annually. He was able, impetuous, frank, perfectly fearless in controversy, a speaker and preacher of much eloquence. A supporter of missions to the Oneida Indians, Hobart helped relocate many of the Oneida from New York State to Wisconsin.

Hobart was elected a member of the American Antiquarian Society in 1814. The AAS holds numerous books and pamphlets authored by or related to Hobart, including many sermons and other theologically related texts.

One of the founders of the General Theological Seminary, Hobart became its professor of Pastoral Theology in 1821, served as its first dean and governed the seminary as bishop. He opposed the plan of Philander Chase, Bishop of Ohio, for an Episcopal seminary in that diocese; but when the Ohio seminary was made directly responsible to the House of Bishops, Hobart withdrew his opposition.

Bishop Hobart supported the High Church Movement within the Episcopal Church. A predecessor of the Anglo-Catholic Movement deriving from the Oxford Movement in the 1830s and 40s, the High Church movement, like the Anglo-Catholic, stressed continuity with the pre-Protestant Reformation church, while at the same time strongly opposed certain Roman Catholic doctrines. The movement emphasized the Apostolic Succession and Anglican Covenantal Theology. In contrast to the later Anglo-Catholic movement, Hobart's High Churchmanship did not have a significant liturgical character. Hobart emphasized the significance of baptism and apostolic succession, and how the apostolic succession affected Episcopal ecumenical relationships and ministry with "non-apostolic" churches. The seminary became a center for the High Church Movement and later for the Oxford Movement in America. Through General Seminary, Hobart in particular influenced two future bishops: Benjamin Onderdonk and Jackson Kemper.

Hobart also opposed the American Bible Society, but was a founder in 1809 of the Bible and Common Prayer Book Society. In 1816 he published a pamphlet to dissuade Episcopalians from joining the new movement, which he thought the Protestant Episcopal Church had not the numerical or the financial strength to control.

Instead, in 1818, to counterbalance the Bible Society's influence and especially of Scott's Commentaries, Hobart began to edit the Family Bible of the Society for Promoting Christian Knowledge. He also delivered episcopal charges to the clergy of Connecticut and New York entitled The Churchman (1819) and The High Churchman Vindicated (1826), in which Hobart accepted the label high churchman, explaining his principles to distinguish them from the corruptions of the Church of Rome and from the Errors of Certain Protestant Sects.

By 1818, Hobart had also become convinced that an institution of higher education was needed in the western reaches of the state of New York. Though he had visited many areas as a bishop, he selected the small village of Geneva on Seneca Lake for his new outpost of learning. The site for the new Geneva College was selected in 1820, and the first building erected in 1822. Geneva College became Hobart Free College, later renamed Hobart College in 1852 in honor of its founder, and which became Hobart and William Smith Colleges.

In failing health, Hobart visited Europe from 1823 to 1825. Upon his return, he preached a sermon entitled The United States of America compared with some European Countries, particularly England (published 1826). Hobart so criticized the establishment, state patronage, cabinet appointment of bishops, low discipline, and the low requirements of theological education, as to rouse much hostility in England, where he had been highly praised for two volumes of Sermons on the Principal Events and Truths of Redemption (1824).

== Death and legacy ==
Bishop Hobart died at Auburn, New York, on September 12, 1830, and is buried at Trinity Churchyard near his beloved General Theological Seminary in Manhattan. The Episcopal Church remembers Bishop Hobart annually on the anniversary of his death, September 12.

Robert Pritchard notes that "Hobart's powerful personality, his skill as a writer and polemicist, the pervasive influence of his former assistants, and his influence on the General Theological Seminary combined to make his theological stance the standard for the high-church party in the first half of the nineteenth century." High church theology before the American Civil War is now known as the "Hobartian Synthesis" or "Hobartian High-Churchmanship".

The village of Hobart, New York was named after him in 1828. The Church of the Holy Apostles in Oneida, Wisconsin was dedicated in his memory, and nearby Hobart, in Brown County, Wisconsin, was named for him in 1908.

In 2026, Trinity Church commissioned an opera about Hobart's life. Entitled Great Awakenings: John Henry Hobart and America, it was composed by David Hurd with a libretto by Christopher Dylan Herbert.

=== Consecrators ===
- William White, first and fourth Presiding Bishop, first Bishop of Pennsylvania
- Samuel Provoost, third Presiding Bishop, first Bishop of New York
- Abraham Jarvis, second Bishop of Connecticut

=== Publications ===
- A Clergyman's Companion (1805)
- A Companion for the Altar (1804)
- A Companion to the Book of Common Prayer (1805)
- Festivals and Fasts (1804)

== See also ==
- List of bishops of the Episcopal Church in the United States of America

== Sources ==
- The Catholic Movement in the American Episcopal Church (2nd Ed.) by George E. DeMille (Philadelphia: Church Historical Society, 1950)
- A History of the Episcopal Church by Robert Prichard (Harrisburg, PA: Morehouse Pub., 1999)
- The Episcopal Church Annual. Morehouse Publishing: New York, NY (2005).
- Memorial of Bishop Hobart, containing a Memoir (New York, 1831)
- John McVicar, The Early Life and Professional Years of Bishop Hobart (New York, 1834)
- John McVicar, The Closing Years of Bishop Hobart (New York, 1836).

Episcopal Church (USA) titles
Preceded by Benjamin Moore	3rd Bishop of New York; 1816–1830	Succeeded by Benjamin T. Onderdonk
