= Samuel Provoost =

American academic and clergyman (1742–1815)

The Most Reverend Samuel Provoost
- 3rd Presiding Bishop of the Episcopal Church
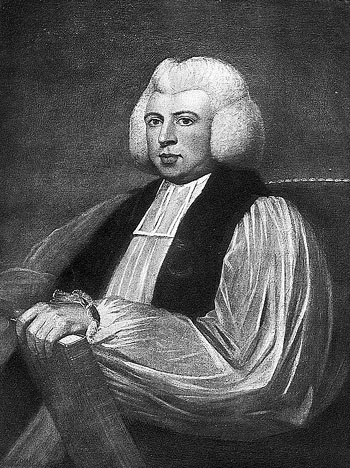
- Samuel Provoost
- Church: Episcopal Church
- In office: 1792–1795
- Predecessor: Samuel Seabury
- Successor: William White
- Other post: Bishop of New York (1787–1815)

Orders
- Ordination: March 25, 1766 by Edmund Keene
- Consecration: February 4, 1787 by John Moore

Personal details
- Born: March 11, 1742 New York City, Province of New York, British America
- Died: September 6, 1815 (aged 73) New York City, New York, U.S.
- Buried: Trinity Church Cemetery
- Denomination: Anglican
- Parents: John Provoost and Eva Rutgers
- Spouse: Maria Bousfield (m. 1766)
- Education: King's College, New York; Peterhouse, Cambridge; University of Leiden
- Signature: Samuel Provoost's signature

Ordination history of Samuel Provoost
History
Diaconal ordination
- Ordained by: Richard Terrick, (London)
- Date: 3 February 1766
- Place: Chapel Royal, St James's Palace, London
Priestly ordination
- Ordained by: Edmund Keene, (Chester)
- Date: 25 March 1766
- Place: Chapel Royal, Banqueting House, London
Episcopal consecration
- Principal consecrator: John Moore, (Canterbury)
- Co-consecrators: William Markham (York); Charles Moss (Bath and Wells); John Hinchliffe (Peterborough)
- Date: 4 February 1787
- Place: Lambeth Palace Chapel, London
Episcopal succession
Bishops consecrated by Samuel Provoost as principal consecrator
- Thomas John Claggett: 17 September 1792

Samuel Provoost (March 11, 1742 – September 6, 1815) was an American academic and Anglican minister. He was one of the two first Chaplains of the United States Senate, along with William Linn, (Note: Provost and Linn alternated on a weekly basis.) and the first bishop of the Episcopal Diocese of New York, as well as the third presiding bishop consecrated for the Episcopal Church of the United States. He was consecrated as bishop of New York in 1787 along with William White, bishop of Pennsylvania. He was the first Episcopal bishop of Dutch and Huguenot ancestry.

== Early life ==
Coat of arms of Samuel Provoost

Samuel Provoost was born in New York City, Province of New York on 26 February 1742, to a family of Dutch and Huguenot ancestry. His parents were John Provoost and Eva Rutgers. He was baptized on 28 February 1742. Provoost was a direct descendant of David Provoost from New Amsterdam, New Netherland. His paternal grandmother was Mary (née Spratt) Alexander (1693–1760).

Provoost was educated at King's College (now known as Columbia University), graduating in 1758, and promoted to Master of Arts in 1761. That same year, he sailed to Europe. He eventually continued his studies at Peterhouse, Cambridge, in Great Britain, from which he graduated with a Bachelor of Arts in 1766. Samuel was fluent in Hebrew, Greek, and Latin, and while he was at Cambridge he learned French and Italian, gaining distinction as a linguist. During this time, he also matriculated at the University of Leiden, Dutch Republic, on 28 July 1764.

== Career ==
In February 1766, Provoost was ordained a deacon at the Chapel Royal of St James's Palace in Westminster and a priest in March 1766. In September 1766, he sailed to New York with his wife and in December he became an assistant rector of Trinity Church. Provoost's dry preaching style, along with his support for American independence, offended some church members and in 1769 a motion was made in the vestry to dispense with his services. The vestry subsequently resolved "That Mr. Provoost be continued, and paid by what can be raised by subscription only", but funds weren't forthcoming and in 1771 Provoost resigned and settled in Dutchess County near his friends Walter Livingston and Robert R. Livingston.

During his 13 years there he preached occasionally in neighboring churches, and joined his neighbors in their pursuit of the British after the burning of the town of Esopus, but he declined offers to serve as a delegate to the Provincial Congress and as chaplain of the New York Constitutional Convention of 1777, as well as the rectorship of churches in Charleston, South Carolina, and Boston.

In 1783, after the end of the American Revolutionary War, the outspoken Tory rector of Trinity Church, Charles Inglis (the future first Anglican bishop of Canada), left for England and was replaced by assistant rector Benjamin Moore, who had stayed at Trinity through the British occupation. Returning Patriots objected and in 1784 installed Provoost as rector of Trinity, with Moore agreeing to stay on as assistant rector. In 1785, he was named chaplain of the Continental Congress.

The Episcopal Church of the United States broke away from the Church of England and held its first General Convention in 1785. In 1786 Provoost was elected first Bishop of New York at the Diocesan Convention. A short while later, he was honored with the degree of Doctor of Divinity from the University of Pennsylvania. In 1787, Provoost was consecrated with Dr. William White at Lambeth Place by Dr. John Moore. Provoost was elected Chaplain to the Senate in 1789. Due to health issues, he resigned the rectorship of Trinity in 1800. The following year, Provoost sought to relinquish his episcopal office, but the House of Bishops declined his resignation, instead appointing Moore as Adjutant Bishop. Provoost effectively retired, but remained Bishop until his death in 1815.

== Personal life ==
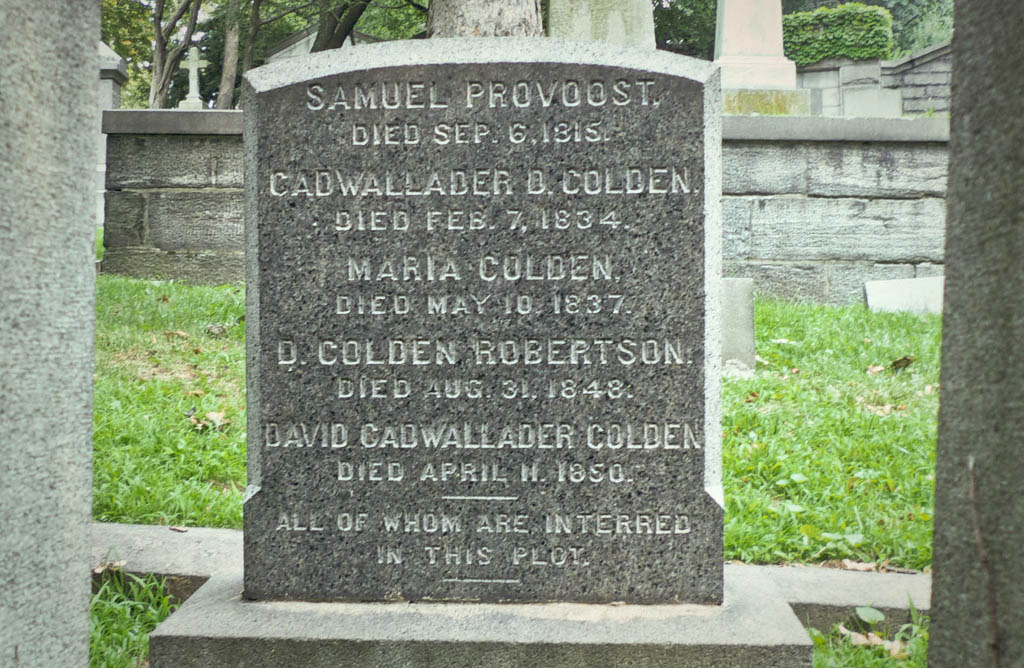
Provoost's headstone at Trinity Church Cemetery and Mausoleum in Hamilton Heights, Manhattan

On June 8, 1766, he married Maria Bousfield (d. 1799), who was the daughter of Thomas Bousfield, an affluent Irish banker and the sister of Benjamin Bousfield, a Sheriff of Cork City. Their children were:

- Maria Provoost (1770–1837), who married Cadwallader D. Colden (1769–1834) in 1793.
- Benjamin Bousfield Provoost (1776–1841), who married Nellie French (d. 1863) in 1803, and had 8 children.
- John Provoost (d. 1800), who died young.
- Susanna Elizabeth Provoost, who married George Rapalje (1771–1885) in 1798. and later Dr. Julian Xavier Charbet (1792–1859).

His wife died in August 1799. Provoost died in 1815 due to a stroke.

== Consecrators ==
- John Moore, 88th Archbishop of Canterbury
- William Markham, 77th Archbishop of York
- Charles Moss, Bishop of Bath and Wells

== See also ==
- Dutch Americans
- Historical list of the Episcopal bishops of the United States
- History of the Anglican Communion
- List of Episcopal bishops of the United States
- List of presiding bishops of the Episcopal Church in the United States of America

== Citations ==
Sources

- Freeman, Douglas Southall (1948). George Washington, a biography. Vol. VI. New York: Charles Scribner's Sons.
- W. S. Perry, The History of the American Episcopal Church, 1587-1883 (Boston, 1885)
- The Centennial History of the Protestant Episcopal Church in the Diocese of New York, 1785-1885, edited by J. G. Wilson, (New York, 1886)

Episcopal Church (USA) titles
Preceded by (none)	1st Bishop of New York; 1787–1815	Succeeded by Benjamin Moore
Preceded by Samuel Seabury	3rd Presiding Bishop; September 13, 1792 – September 8, 1795	Succeeded by William White
Preceded by (none)	1st US Senate Chaplain; April 25, 1789 – December 9, 1790	Succeeded by William White
