= Virginia State Route 263 =

State highway in Shenandoah County, Virginia, US

State Route 263
- Orkney Grade

Route information
- Maintained by VDOT
- Length: 12.83 mi (20.65 km)
- Existed: 1933–present
- Tourist routes: Virginia Byway

Major junctions
- West end: SR 659 at Orkney Springs
- SR 42 near Mount Clifton
- East end: US 11 in Mount Jackson

Location
- Country: United States
- State: Virginia
- Counties: Shenandoah

Highway system
- Virginia Routes; Interstate; US; Primary; Secondary; Byways; History; HOT lanes
← SR 262	→ I-264

State Route 263 (SR 263) is a primary state highway in the U.S. state of Virginia. Known as Orkney Grade, the state highway runs 12.63 miles (20.33 km) from SR 659 in Orkney Springs east to U.S. Route 11 (US 11) in Mount Jackson. SR 263 connects Mount Jackson with a resort area in the mountains of southwestern Shenandoah County.

SR 263 is a Virginia Byway.

== Route description ==
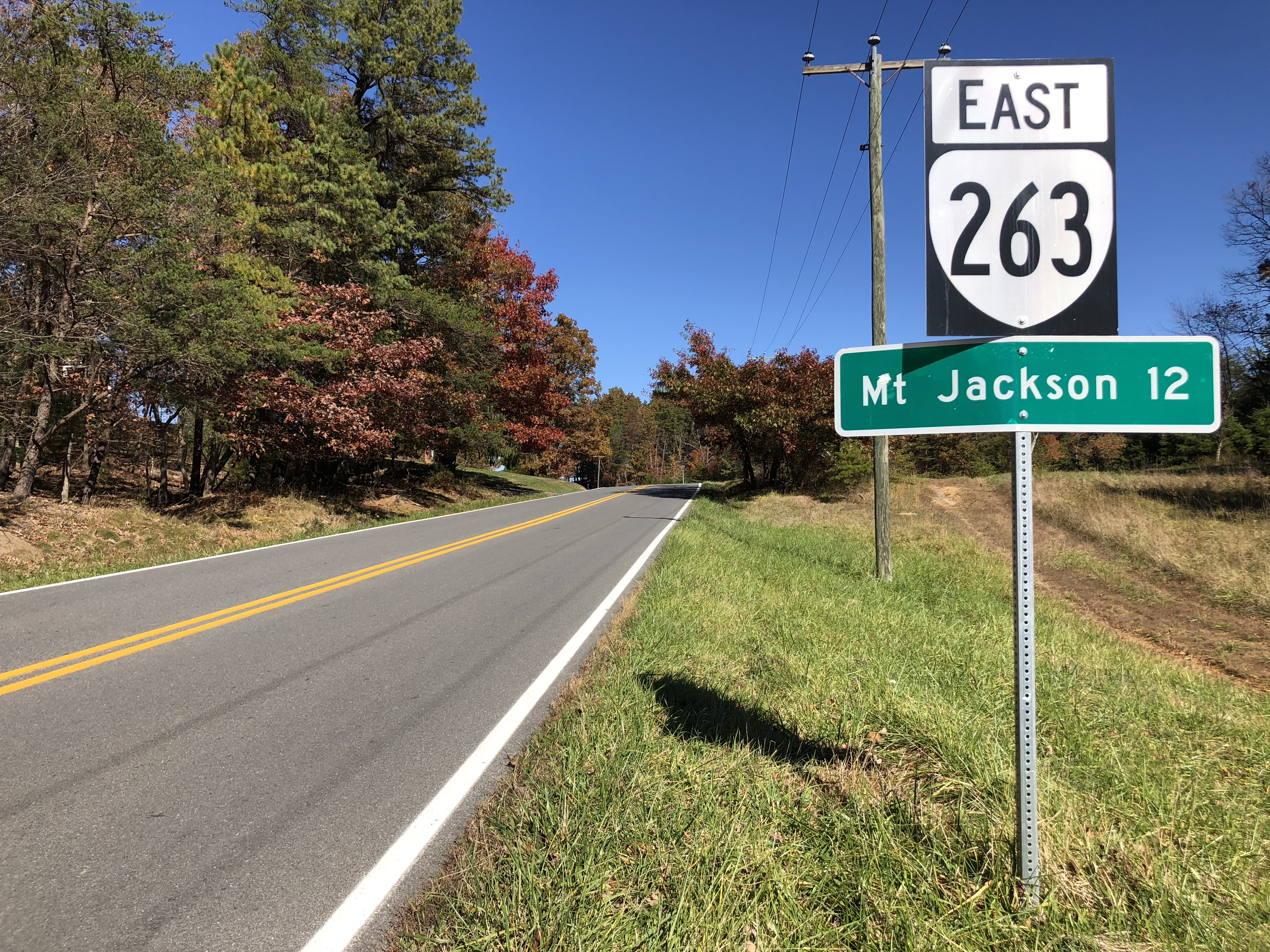
View east along SR 263 in Orkney Springs

SR 263 begins at the eastern end of Shrine Mont Circle, a loop that is designated SR 659 and serves Shrine Mont, an Episcopal Diocese of Virginia retreat that hosts the annual Shenandoah Valley Music Festival. The state highway heads northeast as a two-lane undivided road from Orkney Springs through a narrow valley between Great North Mountain to the west and Supin Lick Mountain to the east. After passing the Bryce Resort, SR 263 veers southeast and crosses the latter mountain and follows Straight Run through a gap in Timber Ridge to enter the Shenandoah Valley, on the west edge of which the state highway intersects SR 42 (Senedo Road). The state highway passes through Mount Clifton and follows Mill Creek to the town of Mount Jackson, which the highway enters at its underpass of Interstate 81. SR 263 passes under the Chesapeake Western Railway before reaching its eastern terminus at US 11 (Main Street).

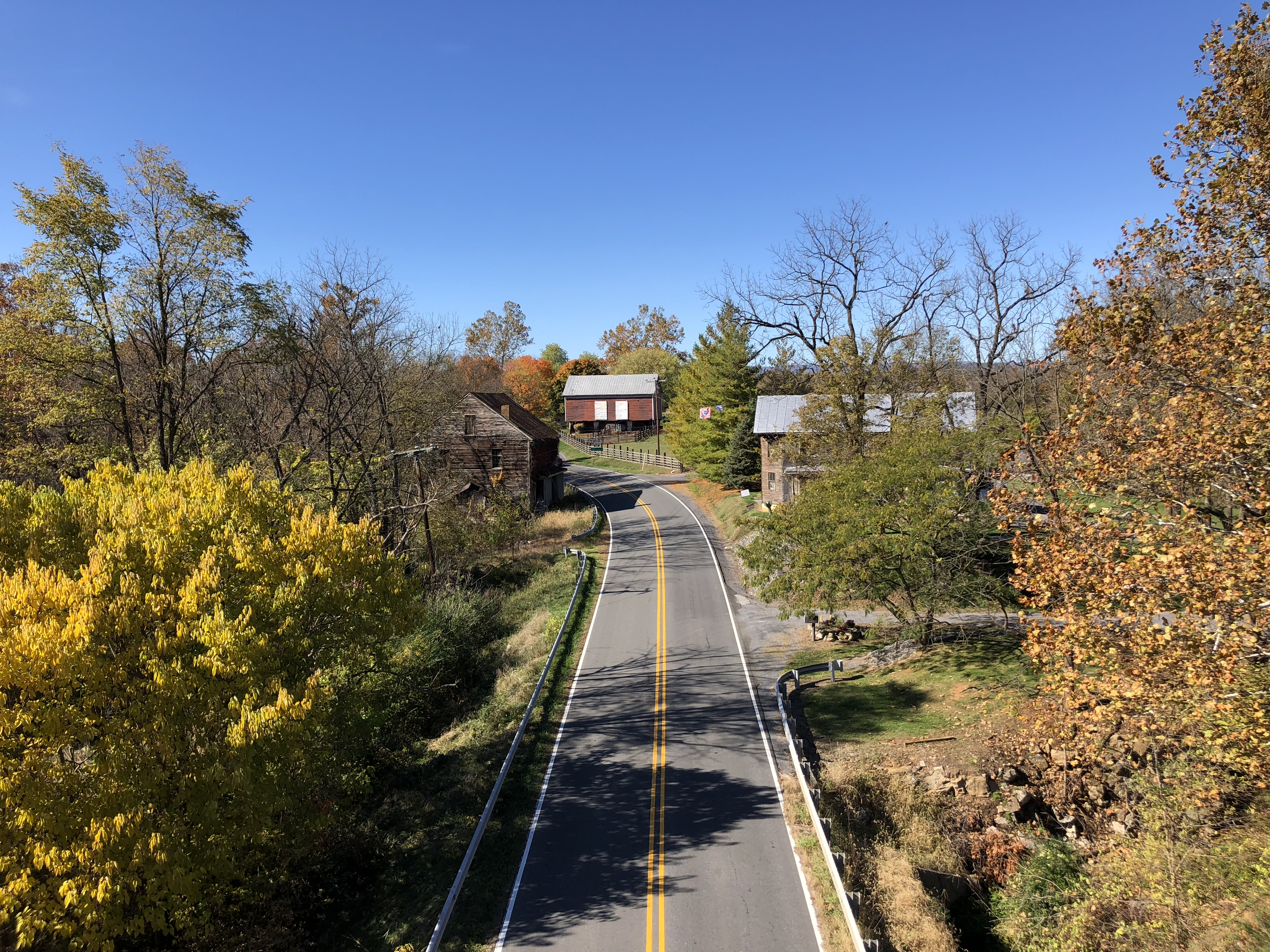
SR 263 westbound viewed from I-81

== Major intersections ==
The entire route is in Shenandoah County.

Location	mi	km	Destinations	Notes
Orkney Springs	0.00	0.00	SR 659 (Shrine Mont Circle)	Western terminus
Basye			SR 717 (Alum Springs Road)	former SR 265 north
	6.49	10.44	SR 42 (Senedo Road) – Woodstock, Harrisonburg	
Mount Jackson	12.83	20.65	US 11 (Main Street) – Winchester, Staunton	Eastern terminus
1.000 mi = 1.609 km; 1.000 km = 0.621 mi

< SR 335	Spurs of SR 33; 1923–1928	SR 337 >
< SR 819	District 8 State Routes; 1928–1933	SR 821 >
