= Donald DePoy =

American bluegrass musician (born 1949)

- Born: Donald Allen DePoy; August 10, 1949 (age 77)
- Origin: Harrisonburg, Virginia, Rockingham County, Virginia, United States
- Genres: Bluegrass; Country
- Occupations: singer-songwriter, musician
- Instruments: vocals, guitar, mandolin, 5-string banjo, dobro, mountain dulcimer, autoharp
- Years active: 1959–present
- Member of: Me & Martha
- Website: meandmartha.info

Donald DePoy (born August 10, 1949, in Harrisonburg, Virginia) is an American bluegrass musician, music educator, and music event organizer. He is a fifth-generation bluegrass musician from the Shenandoah Valley and a multi-instrumentalist. He and his wife Martha Hills have performed as the duo Me & Martha since 2005. He is founder of the Shenandoah Music Trail and the first "bluegrass church". He won first place in dulcimer at the 2017 Old Fiddlers' Convention in Galax, Virginia.

He is currently an adjunct professor at Eastern Mennonite University where he teaches all the bluegrass instruments. He and his wife Martha live in the Village of West View in Swoope, Virginia.

== Early ==
Donald Allen "Don" DePoy was born in Harrisonburg, Virginia to Euva Taylor and Carl William DePoy. He is the descendant of four previous generations of bluegrass musicians in the Shenandoah Valley. His grandfather Carl C. DePoy, Emory Stroop, (Note: hailed as "Virginia's Champion Fiddler" when appearing with WSVA's Rural Rhythm Gang in 1938.) and Herb Smoke (Note: considered a "child prodigy" when he started his musical career at 6 in 1907.) were recorded in 1940 by Alan Lomax to be included later in the Folklife Collection at the Library of Congress. DePoy, "a hometown farm boy", started performing as a musician at the age of eight when he first joined his father’s band onstage.

In 1957, the eight-year-old DePoy played with the Mountain Music Makers (Note: Lew Dewitt, the guitar player in the band, would later join The Statler Brothers.) on the snare drum — later playing banjo and guitar with the group. When DePoy's mother joined her husband and son on stage the band name changed to Carl & Don: The Skyline Pals, who from 1962 to 1979 played community dances, lawn parties, and beer taverns in the Shenandoah Valley and eastern West Virginia.

"I grew up in a musical family that goes back a long way," DePoy says. "It was always there. It's like a language, once it's there you always have it. It's just who I am." DePoy has been a professional musician since 1959, mastering bluegrass banjo and the thumb-picking style on guitar. In addition to guitar, DePoy himself plays mountain dulcimer, autoharp, Dobro, mandolin, and the "bass fiddle". He is a winning instrumentalist at the Old Fiddlers' Convention in Galax, Virginia — a popular and prestigious old-time and bluegrass music festival. He has performed throughout the U.S., and Europe and has recordings in the Library of Congress like his grandfather.

== Broadcasting ==
The Skyline Pals started performing a weekly live one-hour radio program on WABH-AM in 1963, later expanding to a two-hour show. The group made their first recording at Ace Recording Studio in Boston, Massachusetts in 1964, called Songs for Mom and Dad. It was released in Europe in 1965, and released in the United States in 1973 (under the Skyline Records label.)

As his father served as engineer for a local television and radio station, DePoy grew up in the field. As he recalls, I was always playing around with transmitters, and that led to a job as a disc jockey at a very early age. As my father was playing records, I was playing around with equipment in the station.

DePoy began disc jockeying at 16 while still in high school. Growing up playing bluegrass, combined with his performing and technical experience, made him "kind of bound to this kind of work," he believed. After taking a bachelor's degree in "radio-television-film" at Hampton Institute, DePoy found employment "designing education television programs for the Virginia community college system."

=== "Mountain Music" television show ===
The television show produced by DePoy and Hill, “Mountain Music” presents a half hour of musical performances and "glimpses of Virginia scenery". Originally airing Sunday mornings on WHSV-TV in the Shenandoah Valley and on Charlottesville station WVAW ABC 16, the musical duo hosts "a growing company" of fellow musicians from the Shenandoah Valley music scene. Bob Driver and Trudy Cole of Staunton perform '20s and ‘30s blues and jazz. Malia Furtado, who teaches violin in Charlottesville, and Edd Michael of Port Republic add the fiddle dimension. Guest bands have included Bob Prilla and Big Hillbilly Bluegrass, Mark Patterson and Midnight Special, Hats in the Creek, and Andrew Carter and Gypsy Hill Ramblers, to name a few. As of March 8, 2023, A total of 64 TV shows were produced and recorded over 150 musicians for a collection for the Folklife archives at The Library of Congress. To assist in the production and distribution rants were awarded by Virginia Tourism, Virginia Commission for the Arts and Virginia Humanities. The music collection is the first of its kind since 1940. Check out Shenandoah Music Trail’s YouTube channel. The Mountain Music Series Program reached 1,420,245 broadcast households every week (81-weeks) for 115,039,845 Total Households. The shows aired all over Virginia and in NC, PA, OH, WV, MD, KY, IW, IL and Maine.

== Groups ==
In 1971, DePoy founded the North Mountain Ramblers, a musical group featuring Herb Smoke (who was recorded by Alan Lomax in 1940). As part of his employment, DePoy moved to the Philadelphia area in 1979. He founded the band Northeast Extension in Perkasie, Pennsylvania in 1986. He moved to Newburgh, Maine in 1989 and then to Belfast, Maine a decade later, where he met his future wife, Martha Hills. In 2000, he began operation of a sailboat charter business during summers named Gafia (for "get away from it all"). DePoy and Hills started playing music together in Belfast in 2003. They moved back to Virginia in 2007.

=== Me & Martha ===
DePoy and his wife Martha Hills have been performing together since 2005 as Me & Martha, performing some 250 shows a year. Hills fronts the duo, sings, and plays the upright bass — which DePoy taught her to play. In 2000, she first heard DePoy perform in a band in Belfast, Maine and "felt her life change in a matter of measures." “I’d never heard bluegrass music, except for the ‘Beverly Hillbillies’ theme,” Hills said. After hearing DePoy she thought, "I have to have bluegrass in my life." She started learning double-bass in 2001, and she and DePoy started performing music together in 2003, soon adding stories and history to their performances. Hills says, “He’s my soulmate, and we enjoy making people happy.” With her husband playing “everything but fiddle,” she points out, “We’re a party waiting to happen.”

The duo continues the centuries-old music-making tradition of fusing musical genres to create the music, which includes American fiddle/banjo traditions, old-time string band, sea shanties, work songs, hillbilly, traditional and classic country, bluegrass, rural swing, and contemporary folk ballads. They were awarded Top Live Wedding Band by Virginia Living for 2022 and 2023.

Me & Martha are members of America’s Old-Time Country Music Hall of Fame and are on the artist rosters of the Virginia Commission for the Arts and Young Audiences of Virginia as traditional musicians. In 2012, they played 212 concerts, hosted 34 weekly Tuesday night bluegrass jams at James Madison University, participated in a number of community service events, and worked tirelessly on the Shenandoah Music Trail, an organization they founded.

== Education ==
DePoy graduated from Buffalo Gap High School in Buffalo Gap, Virginia in 1968, where he appeared in the senior play. DePoy graduated from Blue Ridge Community College in Weyers Cave, Virginia with an A.S. degree in Education in June 1970. In December 1992 he was awarded a B.U.S. degree in Liberal Studies from the University of Maine at Orono, where he later received an M.Ed. in Social Studies Education (May 1994) and a Ph.D. in the cultural context of bluegrass music (December 1996).

== Teaching ==
DePoy worked for the Virginia Community College System as a media specialist and lecturer throughout the 1970s, teaching courses in Beginning and Advanced Bluegrass Banjo and Beginning and Advanced Guitar. From 1995 to 2005, DePoy was assistant professor at the New England School of Communication in Bangor, Maine, teaching courses in music appreciation, electronic and web page production, desktop publishing, multi-media production, multiculturalism, advertising, and public relations. During the same period, he served at Husson College as graduate and undergraduate adjunct faculty, teaching courses in social science, marketing/public relations, and communication technology. He has taught sociology at the college level in Virginia at James Madison University and Bridgewater College. He serves as adjunct professor at Eastern Mennonite University where he teaches all the bluegrass instruments. Noted by some as "Dr. Bluegrass", DePoy has dedicated his life to teaching and preserving the music he plays, which he terms "Southern mountain music style of Appalachia". In 2013, he became a certified Pete Wernick Jam Instructor.

== Shenandoah Music Trail ==
DePoy and his wife organized the nonprofit Shenandoah Music Trail, which maps out different major venues, trail stops, historic locations, festivals and jam sessions from Winchester down to Roanoke focusing on bluegrass, old-time string band, blues, rural swing, and classic country music. According to their mission, the Shenandoah Music Trail "is a 501(c)(3) non-profit, all volunteer, Virginia-based corporation whose mission is to preserve, promote and celebrate the music traditions of the Shenandoah Valley by bringing together musicians, venues and audiences." DePoy and Hills work with local towns and communities to create economic opportunities from the region’s cultural capital to better advance the community’s economic development efforts through social entrepreneurship and niche marketing opportunities. The Shenandoah Music Trail is sponsored in part by the Virginia Commission for the Arts, the National Council for the Arts, and Virginia Tourism Corporation — to promote the Shenandoah Valley’s musicians, historical events, festivals, and live music venues.

Shenandoah Music Trail received a $5,000 grant from the Commonwealth of Virginia in May 2022 to fund a music trail event. More than $2.7 million in "matching grant and reimbursable sponsorship funds" were granted to over 250 tourism programs around Virginia with the aim of increasing "visitation and traveler spending while bolstering economic recovery" in the wake of the COVID-19 shutdowns.

== WestView Community Place ==
When DePoy and Hills moved back to the area where he'd grown up in September 2017, they moved into his parents' former house just down the street from the West View United Methodist Church, where they'd hoped to worship. They discovered the church had closed. With the building sitting vacant for some months, DePoy called the Methodist dioceses and ask what could be done. As to how they got a "bluegrass church" going, Hills explains:

We said . . we could have a jam once a week to bring the community in. It's not really like a church, but we do something in our daily walk ... we find that our calling, what fills us up, is providing music to people who might not normally hear it.

They've been holding monthly bluegrass jams, known as Bluegrass Spirit Jams, at the once-vacant church since February 2018. The aim of these sessions is "to celebrate God’s presence, communicate God’s love and to honor the rich music heritage of the Shenandoah Valley." As Hill states, "It is here diversity of talents and gifts are not only invited but encouraged through fellowship and bluegrass music." She adds, "It's a non-traditional church, it's unconventional."

The Bluegrass Spirit Jams are an extension of the work they were doing as live performers. Touring around the country as Me & Martha, doing 250 or so shows a year, people often encouraged DePoy and Hills after shows to keep doing their "ministry." As DePoy describes it, "People would comment, 'We love your spirit and hope you continue your ministry.' Ministry? We were just being ourselves and playing music. We were not doing ministry. That’s what preachers do." But he did see that their music was bringing people together on common ground and, "Anytime you gather people together in fellowship, wherever, not necessarily in a building, that (sic) you're in church." DePoy adds, "A church brings people together."

== Other ==
DePoy is executive director at Shenandoah Valley Mountain Music Makers Association, a tax-exempt 501(c)(3) organization he founded, along with the Shenandoah Music Trail. In 2011 he organized the Oak Leaf Bluegrass & Mountain Music Festival at Luray Caverns and Luray Valley Museum. The show celebrated the 50th anniversary of the first single-day "bluegrass" festival held July 4, 1961 — which sparked the thousands of bluegrass festivals that take place around the world today — and featured such first-generation bluegrass acts as The Stanley Brothers and Bill Clifton & The Dixie Mountain Boys,.

DePoy served as executive director (1993–1997) for F.O.L.K., Inc. (Focus On Local Knowledge) a 501-C-3 not-for-profit corporation chartered to support preservation, dissemination, and education of folk practices, specifically relating to performance and visual arts. F.O.L.K. is publisher of MuseNews, a monthly arts/literature guide.

== Recordings ==
DePoy is a featured performer on eleven recordings and four anthologies of traditional American music. Me & Martha CDs comprise:

- On the Road Home (2005)
- Porch Picking CD (2007)
- Soul Searching CD (2008)
- Whispering Pines (2013)
- Country Girls Blue Moon (2024)

== Performance ==
In addition to performance in thousands of live shows, club, house concerts, festival performances, and workshops throughout the United States (1959 – present), DePoy appearances include:

- WABH-AM one-hour weekly "live" Mountain Music Show (1963–1967).
- Mountain Heritage Craft and Music Festival (1974–1977).
- Philadelphia Folk Festival (1987 and 1988).
- Gettysburg Bluegrass Festival (1988 and 1989).
- American Cowgirls, a bluegrass music play (1992).
- Bulgarian National Television segment (1992).
- Bulgarian National Radio segment (1992).
- Roots & Branches, a bluegrass play (1999).
- Schooner Days, Camden, Maine (2000 and 2001).
- Joe Val Bluegrass Festival, Framingham, Massachusetts (2005, 2006, 2007).
- Shenandoah Valley Music Festival (2012, 2013).
- Featured performer Red Barn Radio Show, Lexington, Kentucky (2015).

== Publication ==
- “Cultural Context of Bluegrass Music: Preference, Familiarity & Stereotypes.” PhD. dissertation, Orono, ME: University of Maine (1996).
- Music Maker’s Guide, Lulu Press: Morrisville, NC (2007)
- Songs to Lift the Spirit, Lulu Press: Morrisville, NC (2008)
- "Along the Shenandoah Music Trail", Americana Rhythm monthly publication (2011–15)
- Music Maker’s Guide, 2nd Edition, Lulu Press: Morrisville, NC (2012)
- Music Maker’s Guide, 3rd Edition, Lulu Press: Morrisville, NC (2018)

== Presentation ==
- Enhancing one’s life through music making (presentation) 23rd Annual Pacific Rim Conference on Disabilities, Waikiki, HI (2007)
- Music Making Workshop (presentation), Blue Ridge Community College Folk Life Festival, Weyers Cave, VA (2007)
- Featured Speaker, Bridgewater College Speakers Bureau, Bridgewater, Virginia Appalachian Square & Round Dances, Bluegrass for Parents & Children, Roots Music History, Sharing Maine’s Coast, Bridgewater College, Bridgewater, VA (2008)
- Washington, DC’s role in preserving the folk music of the Shenandoah Valley: 1940 to present, Historical Society, Washington, DC (2008)
- Music Making in the Shenandoah Valley: Status of oral transmission practices. Annual Virginia Sociology Conference, Lexington, VA (2008)
- Benefits of Music Making Across the Lifespan (paper), Annual SRAD conference at the Society for Research in Child Development, Denver, CO (2009)
- Music of the Shenandoah Valley (lecture), Taubman Museum of Art, Roanoke, VA (2010)

== Honors, awards, distinctions ==
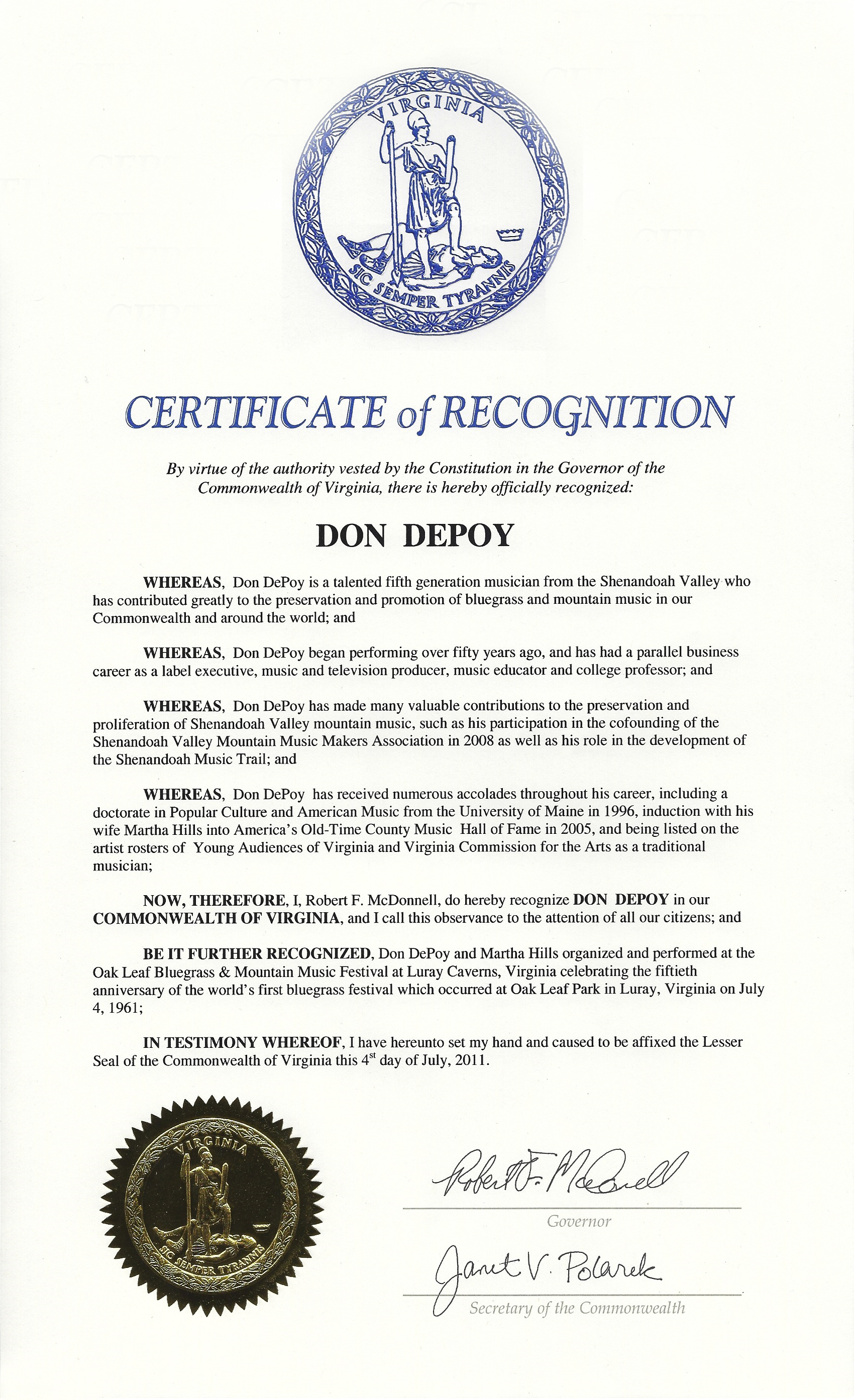
- Governor of Commonwealth of Virginia (July 4, 2011)
  Founding member of the Folk Music Society of the Blue Ridge (1971).
- Music Director for Annual Arts, Craft and Music Festival, Middletown, Virginia (1974–1976) and Weyers Cave, Virginia (1973–1975).
- Music Director for the Apple Harvest Festival, Winchester, Virginia (1976 and 1977).
- Included in the Library of Congress recording "Selections from the 1988 Galax Old Fiddlers' Convention".
- Invited presenter at the Folk Alliance International Conference (1995).
- Chairperson, The Arts and Cultural Tourism committee (1996).
- Member of the Executive Committee for the Greater Bangor Area Arts Council (1996–1999).
- Board of Directors for the University of Maine Orchestra (1997–2004).
- Board of Directors for the Bluegrass Association of Maine (2001–03).
- Honorary Faculty Member Alpha Beta Kappa Honor Society (2002)
- Board of Directors for the Shenandoah Valley Bluegrass and Old-Time Music Association (2007–present).
- Commonwealth of Virginia Governor's Certificate of Recognition in July 2011.
- United States Senator Mark Warner Letter of Recognition in July 2011.
- Became a certified Pete Wernick Jam Instructor in 2013.
- Won first place in dulcimer at the 2017 at the Old Fiddlers' Convention in Galax, Virginia. He also placed third in Guitar (1983) and fifth in Banjo (1985).
- Started the "First Bluegrass Church" at WestView Old Country Church in Swoope, Virginia (2018).
- Holds a Master 200-Ton, near coastal, unlimited passengers United States Coast Guard license with sail and tow endorsements.
- Me & Martha were chosen top Wedding Band in the Virginia Living Magazine "2022 and 2023 Best of Virginia" survey.

== Business ==
In 1979, DePoy worked in New York City as a design engineer with international design and consulting firm Hubert Wilke, Inc., commuting by train two and a half hours each way to Yardley, Pennsylvania. Tiring of the long commute after a year, he became a television producer and executive in Philadelphia in the early 1980s, starting his own television studio, Teleimage, Inc., in 1981 — which became Philadelphia's second-largest independent television/audio production company. As Project Coordinator/Executive Producer for Goodway Marketing, Inc. in Jenkintown, Pennsylvania between 1984 and 1986, DePoy was responsible for block media buys and syndication for a national marketing holding company with twenty-three separate businesses. DePoy was owner of two Laserset Publishing Centers in the late 1980s in Doylestown and Norristown, Pennsylvania. He was President of D&D Marketing, Inc. in Orono, Maine from 1989 to 1995. He also published Auntie M's Guide for Bargain Hunters, a bi-monthly publication with a circulation of 10,000 copies distributed throughout the greater Bangor, Maine region.

DePoy founded Gafia Sailing Charters (Note: the company name is an acronym of "get away from it all".) in 1999, sailing from Belfast City Harbor in Belfast, Maine aboard the ViVa, a registered National Historic Treasure "classic racing yacht" launched in 1939. ViVa, a was retired from charter operation in 2007.

== Personal ==
DePoy is married to Martha Hills, who is from Belfast, Maine. Hills is an early childhood educator (BA) with over 15 years in private and public education who taught in the preparatory music program at Eastern Mennonite University in Harrisonburg, Virginia. His first wife, Elizabeth, was from Manhattan.

== See also ==
- Bluegrass music
- Shenandoah Valley
