= Bryce Resort =

Ski area in Virginia, United States

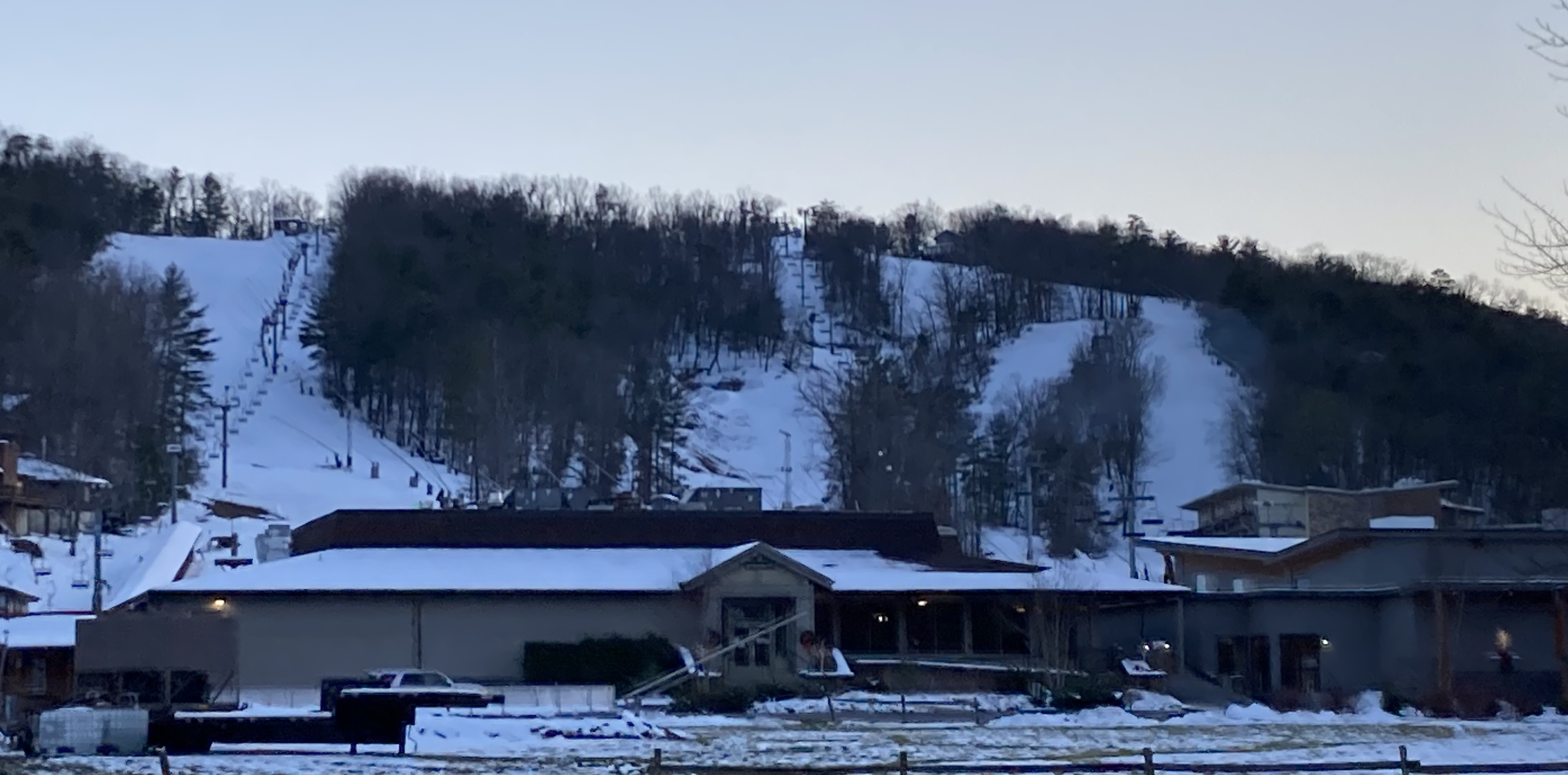

- Location in Virginia
- Location: Basye, Virginia, United States
- Nearest city: Mount Jackson, Virginia; 11 mi (18 km); Washington, D.C. 115 mi (185 km)
- Coordinates: 38°49′03″N 78°45′57″W
- Vertical: 500 ft (150 m)
- Top elevation: 1,750 ft (530 m)
- Base elevation: 1,250 ft (380 m)
- Skiable area: 25 acres (0.0 sq mi; 0.1 km^{2})
- Trails: 12; 33% easiest 50% more difficult 17% most difficult
- Longest run: Redeye
- Lift system: 3 chairlifts: 3 quad 2 surface lifts
- Terrain parks: 1
- Snowmaking: Yes
- Night skiing: All trails except for White Lighting and Hangover
- Website: bryceresort.com

Bryce Resort is a 400-acre, member-owned resort in the northern part of Virginia's Shenandoah Valley that is open to the public. The facility opened in 1965 and is located near the West Virginia border, 11 miles west of Mount Jackson, Virginia. The resort is very popular with residents of the valley as well as families and tourists from the Washington, D.C. area, some 115 miles (185 km) away. Principal activities include skiing, golfing, mountain activities, mountain biking, tennis, fishing, and water sports at Lake Laura and the resort pool.

The ski area was opened as a year-round resort by Pete and Julie Brice in 1965, seeking to attract visitors drawn to the nearby Orkney Springs, and it has been in operation ever since. In December 2020, Bryce was rated one of the Top 25 family-friendly ski resorts in North America by Yelp. Due to the relatively temperate climate of northwestern Virginia, the resort relies considerably on artificial snowmaking and was one of the first and only resorts in North America to introduce grass skiing during summer months, though that activity is no longer supported. Weather permitting, golf is played year-round. The 18-hole PGA Championship course offers challenges of trees and a creek that meanders throughout.

The resort was managed by brothers Horst and Manfred Locher until 1997 and is now managed by Ryan Locher.

== Facilities and activities ==
Facilities at Bryce include the main lodge (with the Copper Kettle Restaurant), a cafeteria (only open during ski season) inside the Shenandoah Center, an outside snack bar called Carter's Hutte, the Express Grill next to the pool, a full-service ski/bike rental and instruction operation, a ski shop, and a golf shop. Bryce Resort boasts one of the largest ski racing teams, with over 60 racers, in the Southern Alpine Racing Association (SARA) league. While alpine skiing and snowboarding are the most popular winter activities, the resort also offers an 800-foot-long (244 m) snow tubing run and an ice skating rink. Summer activities include downhill mountain biking, which replaced ziplining down the slopes, golf, a driving range, a resort pool, disc golf, and an artificial lake named Lake Laura. The resort also features an airstrip with a 2,240-foot (683 m) runway, with the FAA identifier VG18. Directly next to the airstrip is a dog park open year-round from dawn to dusk.

== Mountain lifts ==
Bryce Resort has two quad-chair lifts, one installed in 2012 and the 2nd installed in 2022, which replaced a double-chair lift. The entire mountain is accessible from either lift. Additionally, there are two carpet lifts on the lower slopes to cater to beginners. In 2021, Bryce opened its 2-acre terrain park named Thunder Jug, which is accessible off Red Eye near Lift 2. There is currently no lift service from the bottom of Thunder Jug.

For the 2025-26 season, the resort opened an additional quad lift and four new trails on the backside of the mountain, which expanded the skiable terrain by approximately 35%.
