= Basye, Virginia =

- CDP
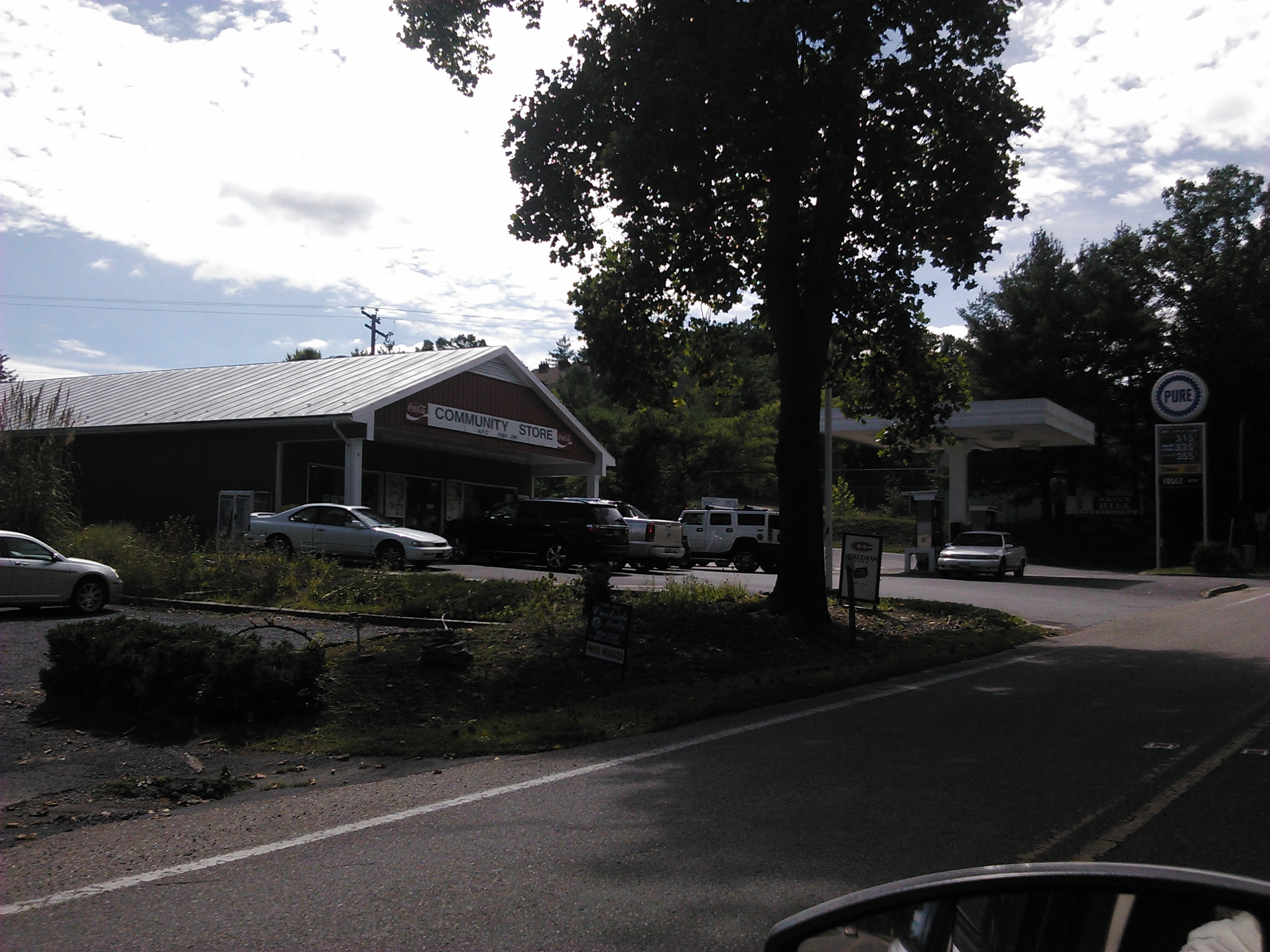
- The general store at the intersection of Orkney Springs Road and road to Bryce Resort serves the wider valley, which Basye and Orkney Springs reside as the only significant store and gas station in the area

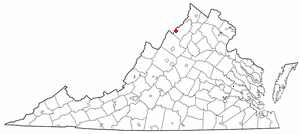
- Location of Basye, Virginia
- Coordinates: 38°49′7″N 78°45′47″W
- Country: United States
- State: Virginia
- County: Shenandoah

Area
  - Total: 8.8 sq mi (22.8 km^{2})
  - Land: 8.7 sq mi (22.5 km^{2})
  - Water: 0.077 sq mi (0.2 km^{2})

Population (2020)
  - Total: 1,374
  - Density: 158/sq mi (61.1/km^{2})
- Time zone: UTC−5 (Eastern (EST))
  - Summer (DST): UTC−4 (EDT)
- FIPS code: 51-04928

Basye is a census-designated place (CDP) in Shenandoah County, Virginia, United States. The population was 1,374 at the 2020 census. As of the 2000 census, the CDP was known as Basye-Bryce Mountain.

== History ==
Basye was named after a local family that lived in the area and whose cemetery still remains off one of the holes of the golf course. Originally considered part of the Orkney Springs community, Basye was named by Martha Basye, married to William Brice, who opened the original resort.

== Geography ==
Basye is located at 38°49′7″N 78°45′47″W (38.818702, −78.763146).

According to the United States Census Bureau, the CDP has a total area of 8.8 square miles (22.8 km^{2}), of which 8.7 square miles (22.5 km^{2}) is land and 0.2 square miles (0.3 km^{2}) (1.05%) is water.

== Demographics ==
Historical population
Census	Pop.	Note	%±
2000	986		—
2010	1,253		27.1%
2020	1,374		9.7%
U.S. Decennial Census; 2000 2010 2020; As Basye-Bryce Mountain in 2000

The community was first listed as a census designated place under the name Basye-Bryce Mountain in the 2000 U.S. census; and renamed Basye for the 2010 U.S. census.

=== 2020 census ===
Basye CDP, Virginia – Racial and ethnic composition Note: the US Census treats Hispanic/Latino as an ethnic category. This table excludes Latinos from the racial categories and assigns them to a separate category. Hispanics/Latinos may be of any race.
Race / Ethnicity (NH = Non-Hispanic)	Pop 2000	Pop 2010	Pop 2020	% 2000	% 2010	% 2020
White alone (NH)	944	1,168	1,242	95.74%	93.22%	90.39%
Black or African American alone (NH)	16	17	10	1.62%	1.36%	0.73%
Native American or Alaska Native alone (NH)	3	4	0	0.30%	0.32%	0.00%
Asian alone (NH)	8	2	4	0.81%	0.16%	0.29%
Native Hawaiian or Pacific Islander alone (NH)	0	0	0	0.00%	0.00%	0.00%
Other race alone (NH)	1	0	1	0.10%	0.00%	0.07%
Mixed race or Multiracial (NH)	6	26	47	0.61%	2.08%	3.42%
Hispanic or Latino (any race)	8	36	70	0.81%	2.87%	5.09%
Total	986	1,253	1,374	100.00%	100.00%	100.00%

At the 2020 census, there were 1,374 people and 491 households residing in the CDP. There were 1,498 housing units. The racial makeup of the CDP was 92.4% White, 0.8% African American, 0.6% Native American, 0.3% Asian, 0.9% from other races, and 5.0% from two or more races. Hispanic or Latino of any race were 5.1% of the population.

Of the 491 households, 58.5% were married couples living together, 22.2% had a female householder with no spouse present, and 12.4% had a male householder with no spouse present. 28.1% of the population were never-married individuals.

8.0% of the population were under the age of 5, 12.9% were under 18 years, 87.1% were 18 years and over, and 22.9% were 65 years of age or older. The median age was 47.1 years.

The median household income was $90,125 and the median family income was $106,250. Married-couple families had a median income of $110,417 versus $52,888 for nonfamily households. About 7.5% of the population were below the poverty line, including 45.8% of those under age 18, 2.5% of those 18 to 64, and none of those 65 years and over.

== Bryce Resort ==
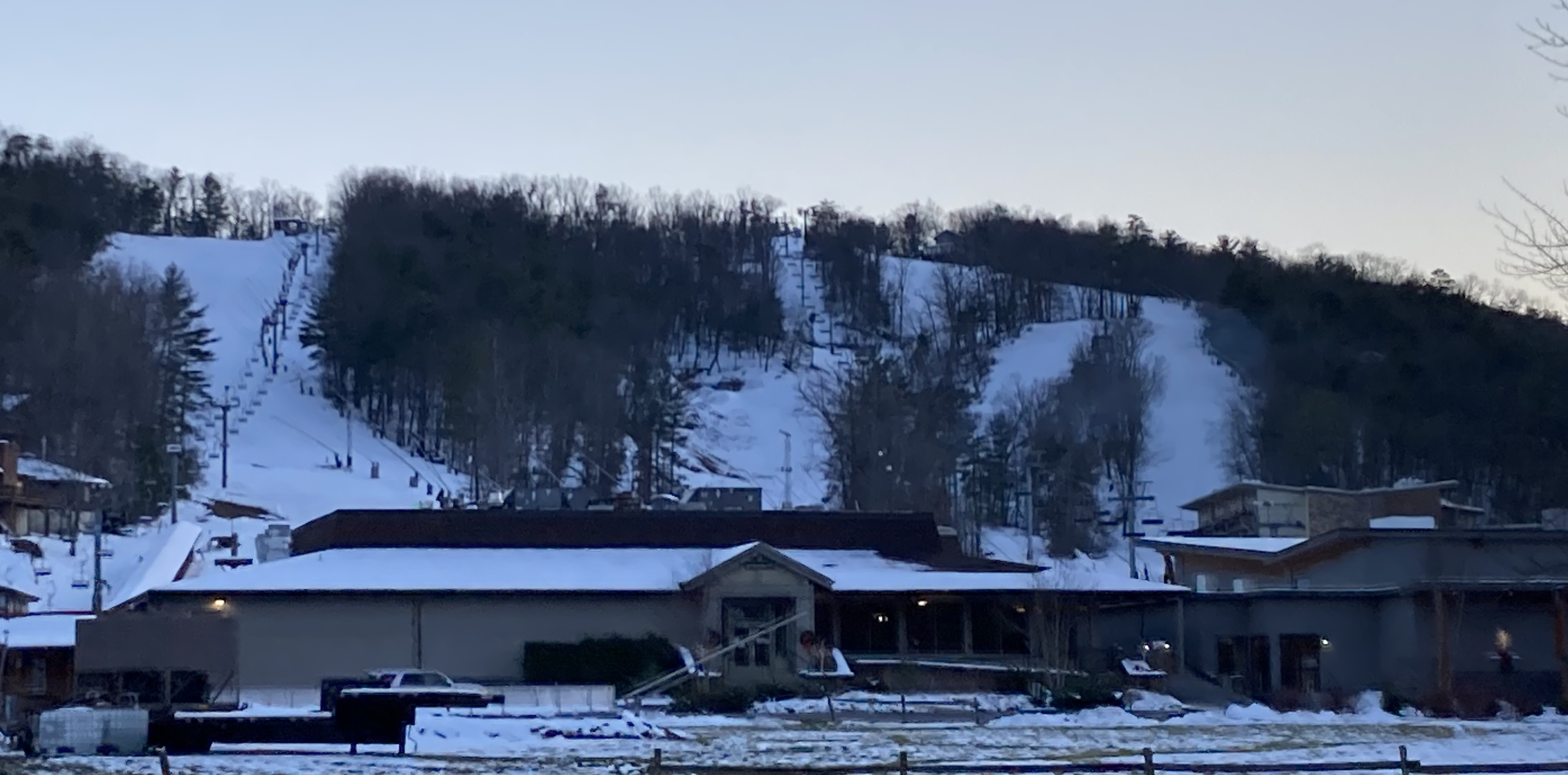
The ski mountain at Bryce Resort

Bryce Resort is a resort occupying 400 acres and was first opened in 1909, owned by William Brice who opened Bryce's Hillside Cottages and Mineral Baths as a way to catch the overflow of guests from nearby historic Orkney Springs Hotel. The name of the resort included a "y" instead of "i" in Bryce since William Brice reportedly wanted the business to have a different spelling than his last name. The early resort was rustic, with hillside cottages and a dining hall, as most of the food was grown on the premises. People would come to escape the city heat and take in the black sulphur spring in Basye.

=== Lake Laura ===
Lake Laura is a 44-acre (18 ha) pond owned by Bryce Resort. Lake Laura is formed by a dam impoundment of the headwaters of Big Stony Creek, creating a rectangular-shaped pool with a maximum depth of thirty feet. It is open to public use and has a boat ramp for that purpose. The Virginia Department of Game and Inland Fisheries began managing the fishery and stocking fish in the pond in 1991. The pond has one of the highest density largemouth bass populations found anywhere in Virginia. Lake Laura had a history of nuisance algal blooms and over-abundant aquatic vegetation caused by nutrient-rich sediment.
