= Great North Mountain =

Mountain in the U.S. states of Virginia and West Virginia

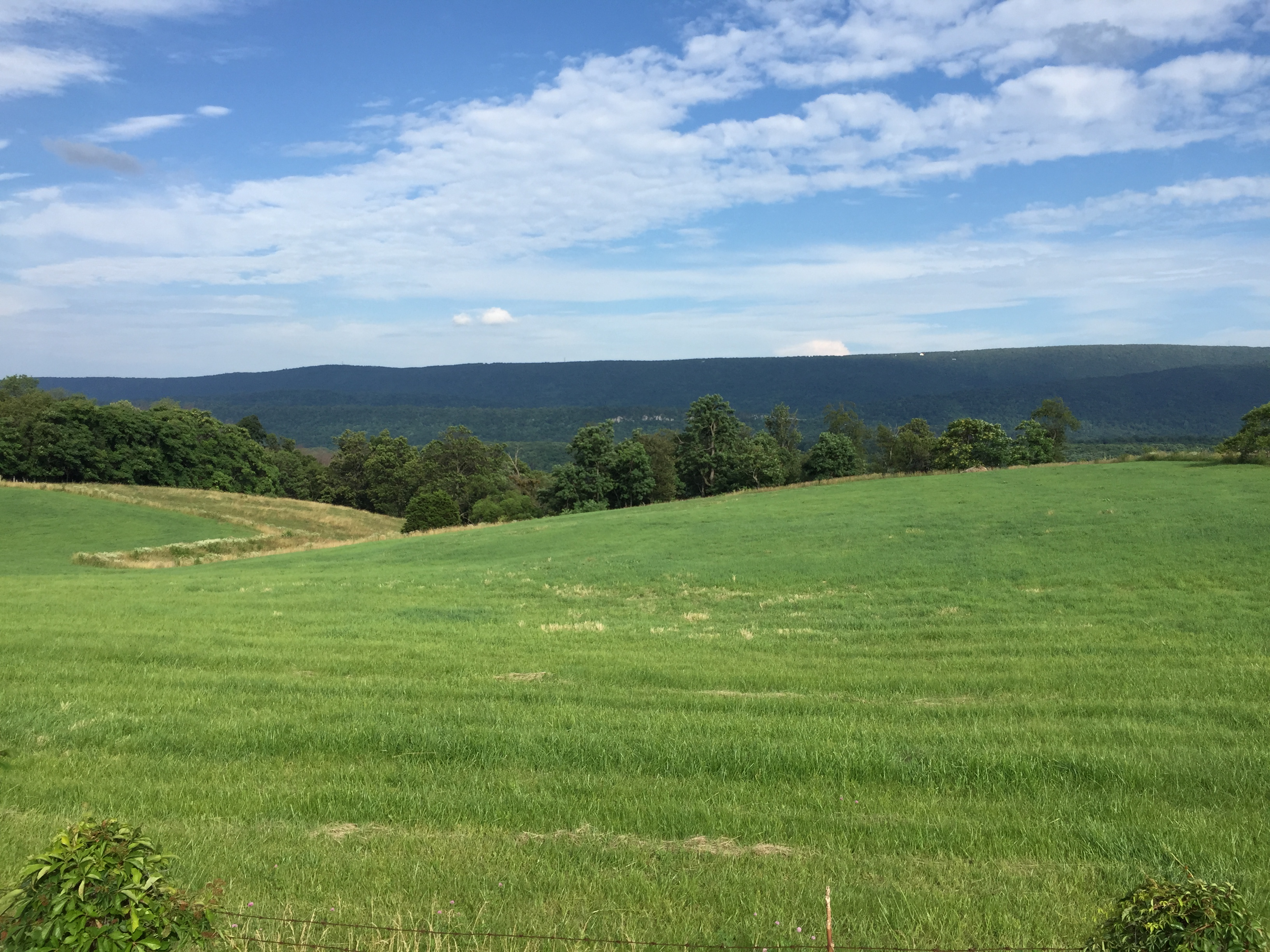
- View of Great North Mountain from High View, West Virginia

Highest point
- Elevation: 3,299 ft (1,006 m)
- Coordinates: 39°02′08″N 78°34′03″W

Geography
- Location: Virginia and West Virginia, U.S.
- Parent range: Ridge-and-Valley Appalachians
- Topo map: USGS Wardensville

Climbing
- Easiest route: Drive, hike

Great North Mountain is a 50-mile (80 km) long mountain ridge within the Ridge-and-Valley Appalachians in the U.S. states of Virginia and West Virginia. The ridge is located west of the Shenandoah Valley and Massanutten Mountain in Virginia, and it is east of the Allegheny Mountains and Cacapon River in West Virginia.

== Geography ==
Great North Mountain is oriented along a northeast-southwest axis from its southern terminus along the North Fork Shenandoah River in Rockingham County, Virginia to its northern terminus at U.S. Route 522 in Frederick County, Virginia. In the south, the initial 7 miles (11 km) of the ridge is known as Church Mountain. For much of its length, the mountain forms the border between Virginia and West Virginia, in two separate stretches; starting 7 miles (11 km) north of its southern terminus at the border of Hardy County, West Virginia, Rockingham County, Virginia and Shenandoah County, Virginia, for 26 miles (42 km) with a 4.5-mile (7.2 km) break where the border shifts east to Paddy Mountain around Wilson Cove, followed by an additional 14-mile (23 km) stretch to the north.

The ridge reaches its greatest elevation, 3,299 feet (1,006 m), at the peak of Mill Mountain, on the border between Hardy County, West Virginia, and Shenandoah County, Virginia, in the George Washington National Forest. The mountain is crossed by U.S. Route 48 and West Virginia and Virginia routes 55 between Wardensville, West Virginia and Strasburg, Virginia.

== Variant names ==
According to the Geographic Names Information System, Great North Mountain has been known by the following names:

- Big North Mountain
- Greater North Mountain
- Greater North Mountains
- North Mountain
- North Mountains

The Board on Geographic Names handed down two official decisions concerning the mountain's name in the years 1941 and 1967. In 1941, the board decided upon the name Big North Mountain and in 1967, it chose Great North Mountain. Both of these name changes were made in order to differentiate the mountain from North Mountain to the north. In the colonial era, Great North Mountain was referred to by some on the frontier as "The Devil's Backbone," an alias noted in the Fry-Jefferson map published in London in 1755.

== Local Sites of Interest ==
Part of Great North Mountain is within the George Washington National Forest, which offers many hiking and hunting trails, such as the Seven Springs trail, and those leading to an overlook on Big Schloss, a peak in the area.

Beside the small town of Orkney Springs, Virginia, at the foot of the mountain, is Shrine Mont, a retreat and conference center owned by the Episcopal Diocese of Virginia. The retreat includes the Cathedral Shrine of the Transfiguration and The Virginia House (formerly known as the Orkney Springs Hotel). Nearby Basye boasts the four season Bryce Resort, which has golf, skiing, mountain biking, and Lake Laura.
