= Weyers Cave School =

Historic school building in Virginia, US

- U.S. National Register of Historic Places
- Virginia Landmarks Register
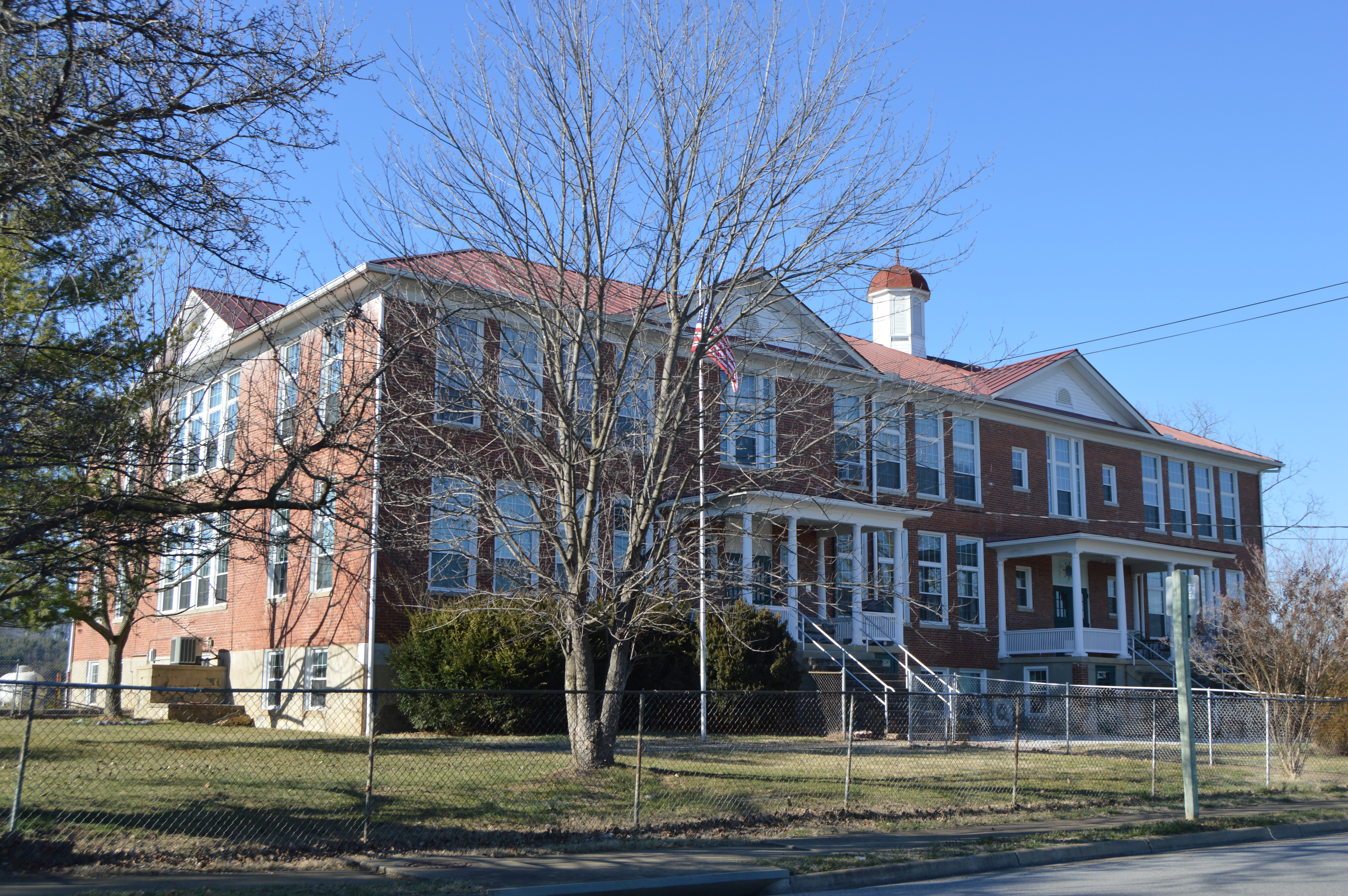
- Front of the school

- Location within Virginia Location within the United States
- Location: VA 276, Weyers Cave, Virginia
- Coordinates: 38°17′17″N 78°54′33″W
- Area: 2 acres (0.81 ha)
- Built: 1916-1917, 1923-1924
- Architectural style: Colonial Revival
- MPS: Public Schools in Augusta County Virginia 1870-1940 TR
- NRHP reference No.: 85000398
- VLR No.: 007-1156

Significant dates
- Added to NRHP: February 27, 1985
- Designated VLR: December 11, 1984

Weyers Cave School, also known as Weyer's Cave Elementary School, is a historic public school building located at Weyers Cave, Augusta County, Virginia. It was built in 1916–1917, and enlarged in 1923–1924. The original section consists of the northern entrance and hall with four-bay classroom blocks to each side. It exhibits a central-passage, double-pile plan. The addition is a four-room and passage block to the south. The Colonial Revival style is reflected in a one-story, one-bay wooden portico with Doric order columns and square balustrade.

It was listed on the National Register of Historic Places in 1985.

Weyers Cave School was closed as a school in 1993. Presently it is the site of Equipping the Saints, a non-profit organization shipping books, clothing, and technology to third world countries.
