= Blue Ridge Community College (Virginia) =

Public college in Weyers Cave, Virginia, US

Coordinates: 38°16′46″N 78°56′16.7″W

- Type: Public community college
- Established: 1967; 59 years ago
- Affiliations: Commission on Colleges of the Southern Association of Colleges and Schools
- Endowment: $14.35 million (2025)
- President: John A. Downey
- Students: 4,983
- Location: Augusta County, Virginia, America
- Campus: Rural
- Colors: blue and white
- Nickname: BRCC
- Website: brcc.edu

Blue Ridge Community College (BRCC) is a community college located in Weyers Cave, Virginia in Augusta County.

The school was founded in 1967 and is a part of the Virginia Community College System and serves students from the cities of Harrisonburg, Staunton, and Waynesboro, Virginia, and the counties of Augusta, Highland and Rockingham. Blue Ridge also has a satellite location at Augusta Health in Fishersville, Virginia. It is located between Interstate 81 and U.S. Route 11 just outside Weyers Cave.

== Alumni ==
- Donald DePoy, born August 10, 1949, fifth-generation bluegrass musician, music educator, and music event organizer.
