= Shenandoah Valley Music Festival =

Coordinates: 38.795526°N 78.818050°W

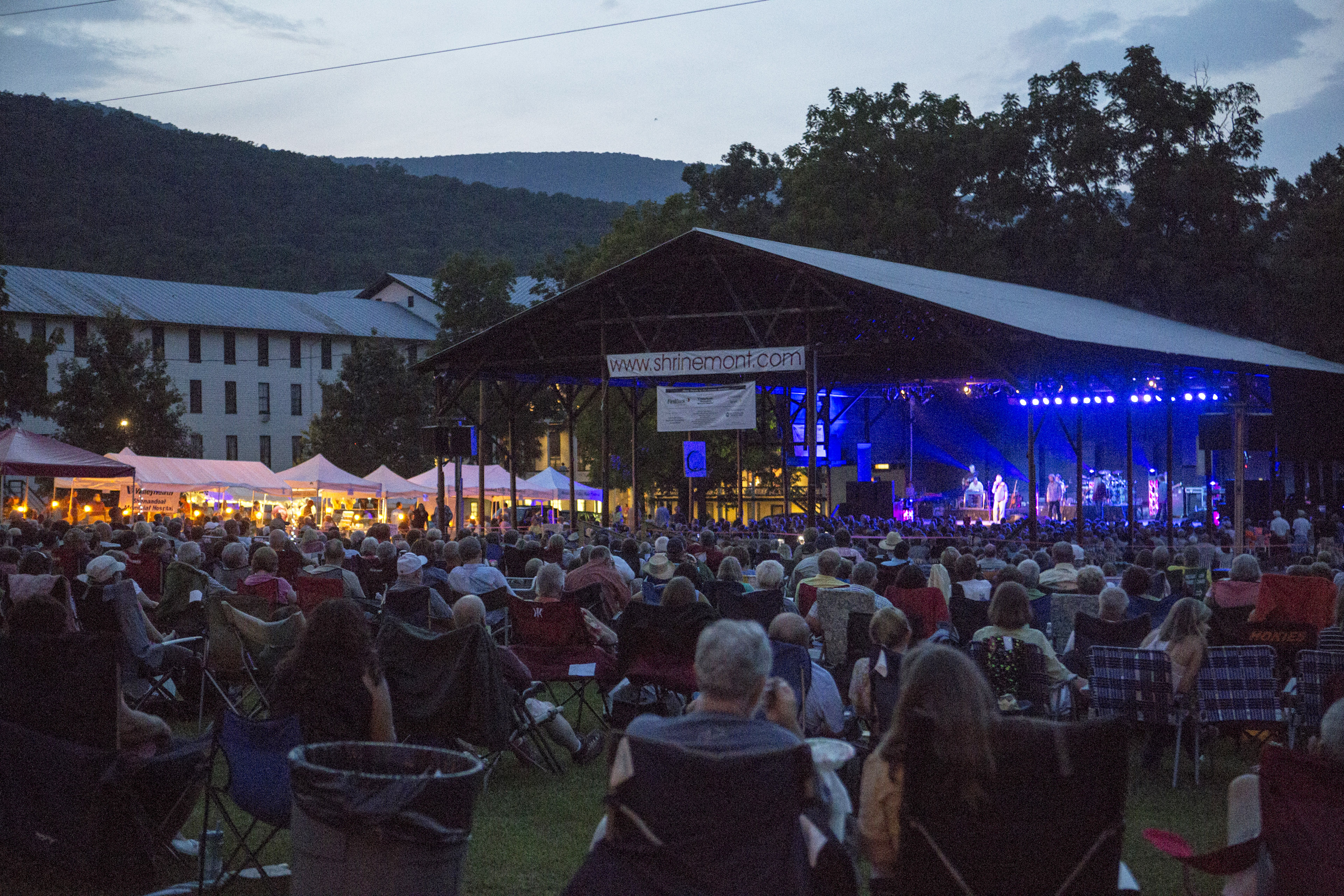
- Shrine Mont, Shenandoah Valley Music Festival's venue
- Genre: Rock, Country, Bluegrass, Americana, Symphonic
- Location: Orkney Springs, Virginia
- Years active: Since 1963
- Website: musicfest.org

Shenandoah Valley Music Festival is the longest running music festival in Virginia. It presents a concert series each summer that takes place mid-July through Labor Day weekend at Shrine Mont in Orkney Springs, Virginia. The Festival started in 1963 as a way of bringing symphonic music to the rural Shenandoah Valley. Symphonic music is still included in the series; other genres including bluegrass, country, folk, pop-rock, roots, and Americana are also presented. Past artists have included Bruce Hornsby, The Nitty Gritty Dirt Band, Home Free, The Temptations, Mary Chapin Carpenter, Kenny G, LeAnn Rimes, Ricky Skaggs, Kris Kristofferson, Pure Prairie League, Poco, and The Beach Boys.

The Shenandoah Valley Music Festival is a nonprofit organization.

Concerts take place in the pavilion of Shrine Mont, formerly the Orkney Springs Hotel, which is listed on the National Register of Historic Places and is now owned by the Episcopal Diocese of Virginia.

The Shenandoah Valley Music Festival has held its concert series each summer since 1963. Despite the Coronavirus epidemic in 2020, the Shenandoah Valley Music Festival still took place with strict public safety measures.

== History ==
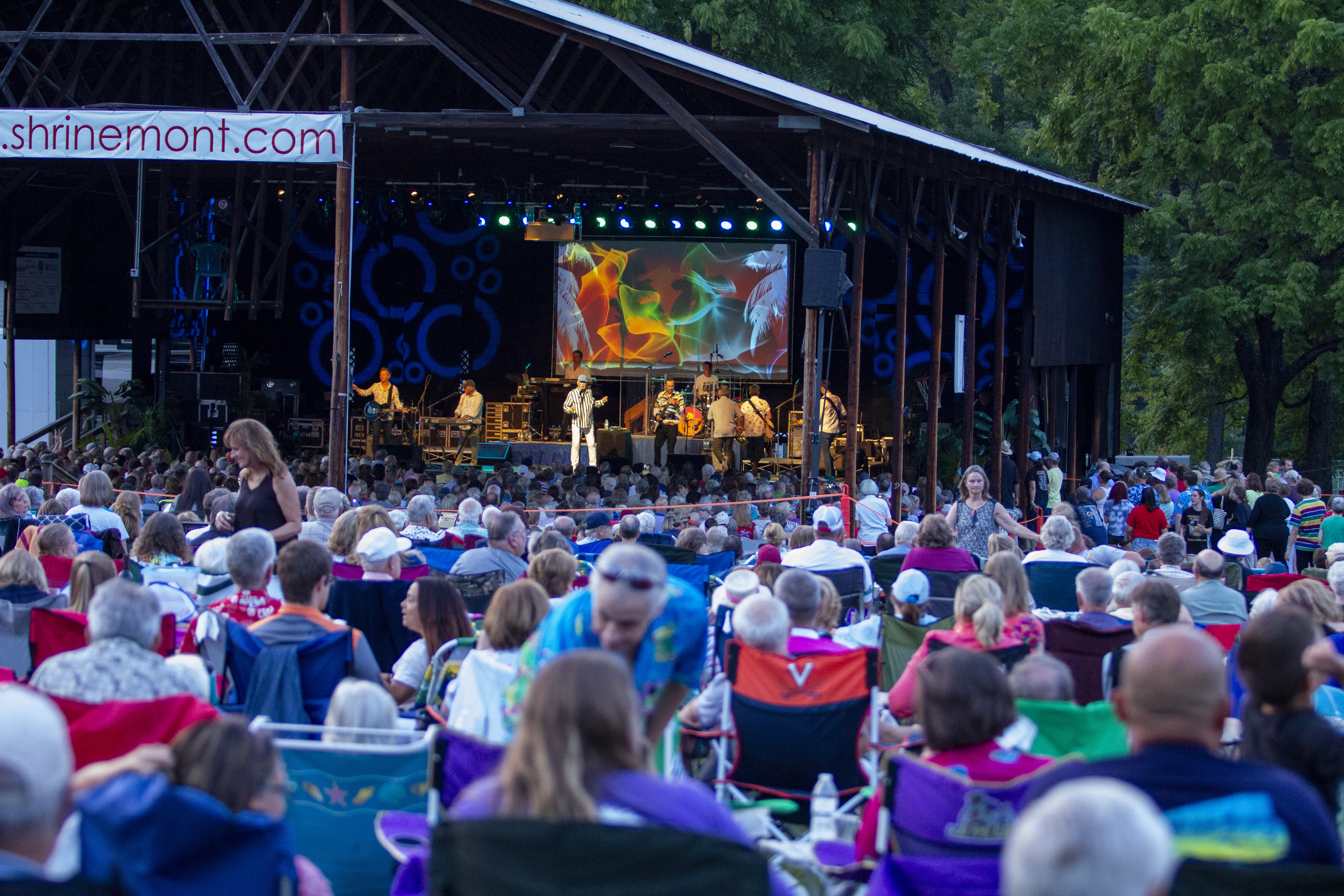
The Beach Boys performing at SVMF in 2019

In the early 1960s Helen M. Thompson, executive secretary of the American Symphony Orchestra League, and Col. Robert Benchoff, Headmaster of the Massanutten Military Academy, sought to bring symphonic music to Virginia's Shenandoah Valley. Under the artistic direction of conductor Dr. Richard Lert, they hosted the Shenandoah Valley Music Festival's first concert, held in the gymnasium of the Massanutten Military Academy in 1963. The Festival then moved to the outdoor pavilion of Shrine Mont by 1976. The Festival remained purely symphonic until the early 1980s but has since branched into hosting a multitude of genres including rock, country, bluegrass, folk, Americana, and pop. From 1979-2015 the Fairfax Symphony Orchestra performed multiple concerts each festival season. In 2016, the Festival partnered with the Piedmont Symphony Orchestra, based in Warrenton.

=== Timeline ===
1963: The Shenandoah Valley Music Festival Committee was formed.

August 11, 1963: A chamber music concert was presented on the front lawn of the Orkney Springs Hotel (attendance 200).

August 16, 1963: The premier public performance in the Shenandoah Valley by the Symphony League Philharmonic Orchestra was presented at Massanutten Military Academy in Woodstock, Va. by the Shenandoah Valley Music Festival Committee and the ASOL.

1966: The Shenandoah Valley Music Festival Committee and the ASOL helped to establish the first string program in the Shenandoah County Public Schools from a federal youth education grant. Fifteen students participated in the first workshop.

1970: A Festival chorus, which was later permanently established as the Shenandoah Valley Choral Society, was formed to perform Beethoven’s Ninth Symphony with the Festival Orchestra.

1975: Musicianship awards — later to be known as the Katharine Benchoff Awards — were established to recognize outstanding band, chorus and orchestra students in Shenandoah Valley high schools.

1976: All Shenandoah Valley Music Festival summer concerts were moved to the Outdoor Pavilion on the grounds of the Orkney Springs Hotel.

1978: Dr. Richard Lert retired and the ASOL Orchestral Workshops at Orkney Springs were dissolved. More than 2,100 people attend one of the final concerts.

1979: The Fairfax Symphony Orchestra played at the Festival for the first time.

1981: The Festival Arts & Crafts Shows were added.

1984: The Festival format was expanded to include big band music, and later jazz, folk and other types of music in addition to symphonic.

1985: The Katharine Benchoff Performance Awards were established to recognize outstanding skill and accomplishments by Shenandoah Valley high school students.

1987: The Festival’s MusicMakers Family Programs were established to reinstate children’s programming and educational activities. The first annual Benefit Ball was held as part of the Festival’s 25th Anniversary season.

1988: The Festival began an annual Community Messiah Sing.

1991 and 1992: The Festival was named one of the Top 20 July events by the Southeastern Tourism Society.

1992: The Shenandoah Valley Music Festival Guild was formed to raise money for the Festival.

1994: Attendance for the Festival’s Symphony Weekends topped 5,000. A College Concerto Competition was established. The Festival receives the Shenandoah Bowl, the SVTA’s highest award for contributions to the Valley’s tourism industry.

1995: The first Christmas Brunch was held.

1997: www.musicfest.org is created. James Carville and Mary Matalin narrated Aaron Copeland’s “Lincoln Portrait” with the Fairfax Symphony Orchestra.

1998: Third record year for total attendance. Tom Paxton headlined the Folk Festival.

1999: The first Festival of Latino Music is presented. Janis Ian is the first Grammy Award winner to perform at the Festival.

2001: The Festival begins selling tickets online. Emmy award winner Tom Chapin performs.

2002: A new program, SVMF’s ArtReach, is launched. This program was designed to give children and their parents the opportunity to interact with performing arts professionals.

2004 and 2005: Tony award winner, Don Pippin guest conducts the Fairfax Symphony Orchestra.

2007: First bluegrass concert at the Festival. Festival presents 10 evening concerts.

2008: Second largest Festival crowd ever. More than 1,800 people see Ricky Skaggs & Kentucky Thunder.

2009: Béla Fleck, Travis Tritt among the Festival’s summer performers. Orkney Springs pavilion transformed into movie house for “Charlie Chaplin at the Symphony.”

2010: Grammy award winners Ronnie Milsap, Mary Chapin Carpenter and the Temptations perform.

2011: Béla Fleck and the original Flecktones make SVMF part of their first full tour in more than 20 years.

2012: The Seldom Scene perform.

2013: The 50th Anniversary of the Shenandoah Valley Music Festival. American Icon Kris Kristofferson performed this season, which also included Dave Mason, the first Rock and Roll Hall Of Fame member to perform at the Festival.

2014: The Oak Ridge Boys played. Other big names of the season were Rhonda Vincent and Rosanne Cash.

2016: SVMF enters into a new partnership with the Piedmont Symphony Orchestra. The PSO performs two concerts during the season and co-sponsors a summer strings camp in Shenandoah County Public Schools with the SVMF. The Festival also drew more than 1,300 patrons to see Bruce Hornsby and The Nitty Gritty Dirt Band and more than 1,000 people came out to see LeAnn Rimes.

2017: This concert season featured the Wayback Weekend Celebration July 21 and 22, featuring Arlo Guthrie and a 50th anniversary celebration of the Summer of Love with the Piedmont Symphony Orchestra and its rock band, performing all the songs made famous by the Beatles and others associated the historic 1967 gathering of hippies in San Francisco. Also performing to a crowd of more than 1,500 on Sept. 2 was 13-time Grammy Award winner Emmylou Harris.

2018: SVMF started using a video screen on stage. The Festival also implemented ticket scanning from patrons’ cell phones. Artists who drew the largest audiences were The Temptations, Kenny G, and Mary Chapin Carpenter.

2019: SVMF extended its “day of concert” online ticket sales from noon up until the start of the concert. Other highlights of the 2019 summer season include The Beach Boys concert on July 26 which drew nearly 1,900 people. This season also featured an Evening with Judy Collins, plus the return of the Oak Ridge Boys for a third season and the Fairfax Symphony Orchestra, after a three year hiatus from SVMF. The FSO performed “The Planets” for a special 50th celebration of the first crewed Moon landing. The event featured video of space imagery produced by NASA, specifically for “The Planets,” and stargazing with telescopes provided by the Shenandoah Astronomical Society. After the close of the concert season, SVMF moved out of the offices it had called home for 45 years, at 102 N. Main St. in Woodstock, and relocated just a block away to 238 N. Main St.

2020: SVMF was reduced to five concerts over two weekends in September because of the COVID-19 pandemic. Each concert complied with state regulated social distancing measures. Another instrument workshop was also held this year.

2021: SVMF returned to a regular concert schedule after COVID-19 restrictions were lifted. Highlights of the season were KANSAS, the return of the Nitty Gritty Dirt Band for a second time, Black Violin, and Steep Canyon Rangers.

2023: SVMF celebrated its 60th anniversary. Highlights included Three Dog Night, Don McLean, The Steel Wheels headlining the Hot Strings and Cool Breezes Minifest, and the return of Pure Prairie League and Steep Canyon Rangers.

== Past Summer schedules ==
=== 2024 ===
- 7/19/24 – Marty Stuart and His Fabulous Superlatives
- 7/20/24 – The Lynchburg Symphony Orchestra: Back to the 80s
- 7/26/24 – An Evening with Dionne Warwick and special guest Rissi Palmer
- 7/27/24 – Shadows of the 60s: A Tribute to Motown
- 8/16/24 – Atlanta Rhythm Section and Orleans
- 8/17/24 – The Oak Ridge Boys: American Made Farewell Tour
- 8/30/24 – An Evening with Mavis Staples and special guest Meisha Herron
- 8/31/24 – The High Kings and Eileen Ivers & The Brigideens
- 9/1/24 – Hot Strings and Cool Breezes, Americana Minifest, featuring Steve Earle on his Alone Again Tour, Dom Flemons and Zandi Holup

=== 2023 ===
- 7/21/23 – Three Dog Night with special guest Jay Psaros
- 7/22/23 – Don McLean with special guest Meisha Herron
- 7/28/23 – The Doo-Wop Project
- 7/29/23 – 1964 The Tribute (Beatles Tribute)
- 8/18/23 – Forever Motown
- 8/19/23 – Steep Canyon Rangers
- 9/2/23 – Legends of Country Rock, featuring Pure Prairie League and Firefall
- 9/3/23 – Hot Strings & Cool Breezes Americana Minifest, featuring The Steel Wheels, Rob Ickes and Trey Hensley, Wicked Sycamore

=== 2022 ===
- 7/22/22 - Marty Stuart and His Fabulous Superlatives
- 7/23/22 - The Fab Four: The Ultimate Tribute
- 7/29/22 - ABBA the Concert: A Tribute to ABBA
- 7/30/22 - Richmond Symphony, with the Shenandoah Valley Choral Society, performing Beethoven's Ninth!
- 8/12/22 - America
- 8/13/22 - Village People
- 9/3/22 - The Spinners
- 9/4/22 - Hot Strings and Cool Breezes, featuring Bela Fleck - My Bluegrass Heart, with Billy Contreras, Jacob Joliff, Justin Moses, Bryan Sutton and Mark Schatz

=== 2021 ===
- 7/23/21 - The Four Tops
- 7/24/21 - Classic Albums Live performs Fleetwood Mac's Rumours
- 7/30/21 - Aoife O'Donovan with special guest Carsie Blanton
- 7/31/21 - KANSAS
- 8/13/21 - Phil Vassar
- 8/14/21 - Black Violin
- 9/3/21 - Madeleine Peyroux - Careless Love Forever Tour
- 9/4/21 - Nitty Gritty Dirt Band with special guest Daniel Donato
- 9/5/21 - Hot Strings and Cool Breezes, featuring Steep Canyon Rangers, The Gibson Brothers and Chatham Rabbits

=== 2020 ===
- 9/4/20 - The SteelDrivers
- 9/5/20 - Eileen Ivers and Universal Roots
- 9/6/20 - Hot Strings and Cool Breezes Minifest, featuring The Seldom Scene and the Gina Furtado Project
- 9/18/20 - The Travelin' McCourys
- 9/19/20 - Sam Bush

=== 2019 ===
- 7/19/19 – The Drifters, The Platters and Cornell Gunter’s Coasters
- 7/20/19 – One Giant Leap — “The Planets” and Beyond, 50th anniversary celebration of the first crewed Moon landing
- 7/26/19 – The Beach Boys
- 7/27/19 – PSO Rocks! “Still Stardust, Still Golden, Woodstock at 50”
- 8/9/19 – The Oak Ridge Boys
- 8/10/19 – Home Free
- 8/31/19 – Judy Collins
- 9/1/19 – Hot Strings and Cool Breezes Minifest, featuring The Travelin’ McCourys, Sierra Hull & Justin Moses, and The Becky Buller Band

=== 2018 ===
- 7/20/18 – Home Free – Timeless World Tour
- 7/21/18 – Piedmont Symphony Orchestra – The Music of Pink Floyd
- 7/27/18 – The Temptations
- 7/28/18 – Piedmont Symphony Orchestra – “Oh, Shenandoah! Music for Your Eyes”
- 8/10/18 – Mary Chapin Carpenter with special guest Emily Barker
- 8/11/18 – Southside Johnny and the Asbury Jukes with special guest James Maddock
- 9/1/18 – Kenny G
- 9/2/18 – Bluegrass Minifest, featuring Michael Cleveland & Flamekeeper, Frank Solivan & Dirty Kitchen and Circus No. 9

=== 2017 ===
- 7/21/17 – An Evening with Arlo Guthrie
- 7/22/17 – Piedmont Symphony Orchestra – “Sgt. Pepper and the Summer of Love”
- 7/28/17 – Pure Prairie League and Poco
- 7/29/17 – Piedmont Symphony Orchestra – “PSO in Tinseltown”
- 8/11/17 – The HillBenders and Seldom Scene
- 8/12/17 – The Midtown Men
- 9/02/17 – Emmylou Harris with special guests Erice Brace, Peter Cooper and Thomm Jutz
- 9/03/17 – Bluegrass Minifest, featuring Balsam Range, Band of Ruhks and After Jack

=== 2016 ===
- 7/15/16 – The Nitty Gritty Dirt Band
- 7/22/16 – The Hunts and The Band Concord
- 7/23/16 – The Piedmont Symphony Orchestra – Pops: “The Beatles and Friends”
- 7/29/16 – Eileen Ivers
- 7/30/16 – The Piedmont Symphony Orchestra – Classical: “Tcheck Out Tchaikovsky”
- 8/12/16 – The SteelDrivers
- 8/13/16 – LeAnn Rimes
- 9/3/16 – Bruce Hornsby
- 9/4/16 – Bluegrass Minifest, featuring The Grascals with Flatt Lonesome and the Barefoot Movement

=== 2015 ===
- 7/17/15- Smash Mouth and Toad the Wet Sprocket
- 7/18/15- Hot Strings and Cool Breezes Roots MiniFest featuring Béla Fleck and Abigail Washburn
- 7/24/15- “She Did It Her Way” with the Fairfax Symphony Orchestra featuring soloists Mary Michael Patterson and Hilary Morrow
- 7/25/15- Jackie Evancho
- 8/7/15- The Lettermen
- 8/8/15- Gimme Abbey
- 9/5/15- The Oak Ridge Boys
- 9/6/15- Bluegrass MiniFest featuring Seldom Scene

=== 2014 ===
- 7/18/14- Straight No Chaser
- 7/19/14- Rosanne Cash with John Leventhal
- 7/25/14- Fairfax Symphony Orchestra—”I’ll Be Seeing You”
- 7/26/14- Silly Bus
- 7/26/14- Fairfax Symphony Orchestra—”A Civil War Portrait”
- 7/27/14- US Airforce Strings
- 8/1/14- Arrival from Sweeden
- 8/2/14- Hot Strings and Cool Breezes Bluegrass Mini-fest, featuring Rhonda Vincent
- 8/30/14- Gustafer Yellowgold
- 8/30/14- The Oak Ridge Boys
- 8/31/14- Eddie From Ohio

=== 2013 ===
- 7/19/13- An Intimate Evening with Dave Mason with special guest, Chatham Street
- 7/20/13- Hot Strings and Cool Breezes Bluegrass Mini-fest, featuring Nothin’ Fancy, Circa Blue, and Me and Martha
- 7/26/13- Fairfax Symphony Orchestra—Classical Masterworks
- 7/27/13- Fairfax Symphony Orchestra—”An Enchanted Evening”
- 8/3/13- Kris Kristofferson
- 8/9/13- Marty Stuart and the Fabulous Superlatives
- 8/31/13- Eileen Ivers and Immigrant Soul
- 9/1/13- “1964” …The Tribute

=== 2012 ===
- 7/20/12- The Blind Boys of Alabama
- 7/21/12- Shawn Colvin with special guest Kat Edmonson
- 7/27/12- Fairfax Symphony Orchestra—”Satchmo, Fats and the Duke!” with special guest Byron Stripling
- 7/28/12- Fairfax Symphony Orchestra—”Classical Masterworks” with special guest Anton Miller
- 8/10/12- Railroad Earth with special guest The Hackensaw Boys
- 8/11/12- SVMF’s Trop Rock Festival featuring Jim Morris and the Big Bamboo Band
- Special guests: Coral Reefer Doyle Grisham and John Frinzi; Latitude
- 9/1/12- Richmond Indigenous Gourd Orchestra
- 9/1/12- SVMF’s Bluegrass Mini-Fest featuring The Seldom Scene, Nothin’ Fancy, Drymill Road and the Gold Top County Ramblers
- 9/2/12- Asleep at the Wheel

=== 2011 ===
- 7/9/11- The Fabulous Hubcaps
- 7/22/11- Ricky Skaggs & Kentucky Thunder
- 7/23/11- 1964… The Tribute
- 7/29/11- Fairfax Symphony Orchestra—Broadway Pops International presents “Oh What a Night!”
- 7/30/11- Fairfax Symphony Orchestra with violin soloist Karina Canellakis
- 8/12/11- Dailey & Vincent
- 8/13/11- Terrance Simian and the Zydeco Experience
- 9/3/11- SVMF’s Folk Mini-Fest
- 9/4/11- Béla Fleck & The Flecktones

=== 2010 ===
- 7/23/10- Ronnie Milsap
- 7/24/10- Celtic Crossroads
- 7/30/10- Fairfax Symphony Orchestra with Alon Goldstein, pianist
- 7/31/10- The Temptations with the Fairfax Symphony Orchestra
- 8/13/10- Mary Chapin Carpenter
- 8/14/10- The Saw Doctors
- 9/4/10- Cherryholmes with special guest Drymill Road
- 9/5/10- The Tom Cunningham Orchestra

=== 2009 ===
- 7/17/09- Eileen Ivers and Immigrant Soul
- 7/18/09- The Dixie Hummingbirds
- 7/24/09- Fairfax Symphony Orchestra—”Charlie Chaplin at the Symphony” featuring special guest Dan Kamin
- 7/25/09- Fairfax Symphony Orchestra—”Romantic Passions” featuring Valentina Lisitsa
- 8/7/09- Béla Fleck and Toumani Diabaté
- 8/8/09- Preservation Hall Jazz Band
- 9/5/09- Roger Day
- 9/5/09- An Acoustic Evening with Travis Tritt with very special guest Jerry Douglas
- 9/6/09- Cherryholmes

=== 2008 ===
- 7/18/08- Kathy Mattea
- 7/19/08- Smithsonian Jazz Masterworks Ensemble
- 7/25/08- Fairfax Symphony Orchestra—”Gypsy Nights”
- 7/26/08- Fairfax Symphony Orchestra—”Dance Mix”
- 8/8/08- Edwin McCain
- 8/9/08- Ricky Skaggs and Kentucky Thunder with special guests The Dixie Bee-Liners
- 8/30/08- Eddie From Ohio
- 8/31/08- Cherish the Ladies

=== 2007 ===
- 7/20/07- Suzy Bogguss
- 7/21/07- Folk Mini-fest featuring Susan Werner with special guests The Arrogant Worms and Trout Fishing in America
- 7/27/07- Fairfax Symphony Orchestra—”A Cole Porter Celebration”
- 7/28/07- Fairfax Symphony Orchestra—”A Tribute to George Gershwin”
- 8/3/07- Jeff Little
- 8/4/07- The World Famous Count Basie Orchestra
- 8/10/07- Arlo Guthrie “The Solo Reunion Tour—Together At Last”
- 8/11/07- The Blind Boys of Alabama
- 9/1/07- Sam Bush with special guest Nothin’ Fancy
- 9/2/07- Terrance Simien and the Zydeco Experience
