= West View Schoolhouse =

- U.S. National Register of Historic Places
- Virginia Landmarks Register
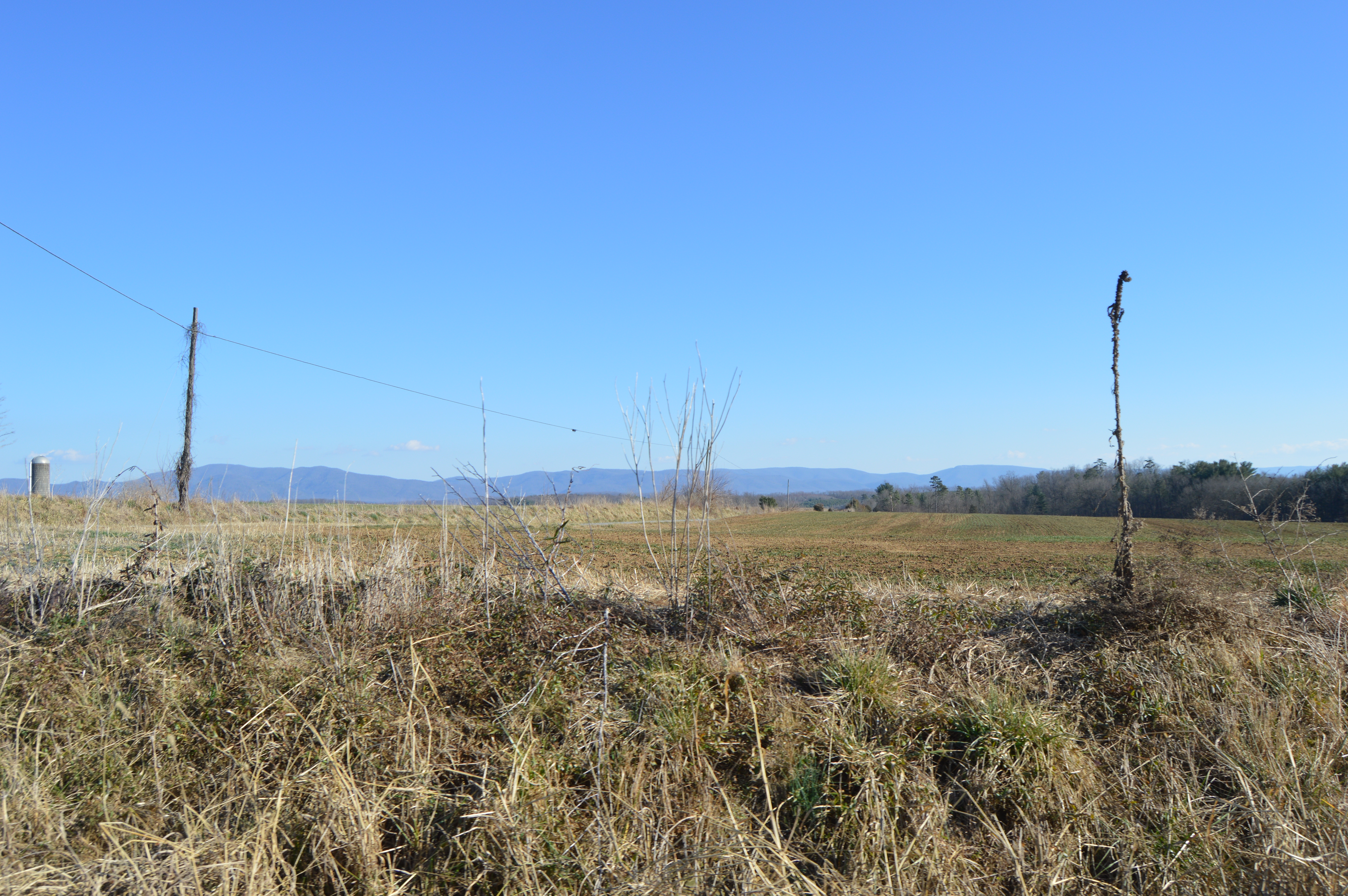
- Site of the schoolhouse

- Location within Virginia Location within the United States
- Location: VA 774 and 773, Weyers Cave, Virginia
- Coordinates: 38°16′2″N 78°54′42″W
- Area: 1.5 acres (0.61 ha)
- Built: c. 1875, c. 1890
- MPS: Public Schools in Augusta County Virginia 1870-1940 TR
- NRHP reference No.: 85000397
- VLR No.: 007-0426

Significant dates
- Added to NRHP: February 27, 1985
- Designated VLR: December 11, 1984

West View Schoolhouse was a historic public school building located at Weyers Cave, Augusta County, Virginia. It has since been demolished. It was a two-room schoolhouse with the first room built about 1875, and the second added by 1890. It was of frame construction with a limestone and brick foundation. The interior was considered the least altered and best preserved of all the surviving one- and two-room schools in Augusta County.

It was listed on the National Register of Historic Places in 1985.
