= Mount Clifton, Virginia =

- CDP
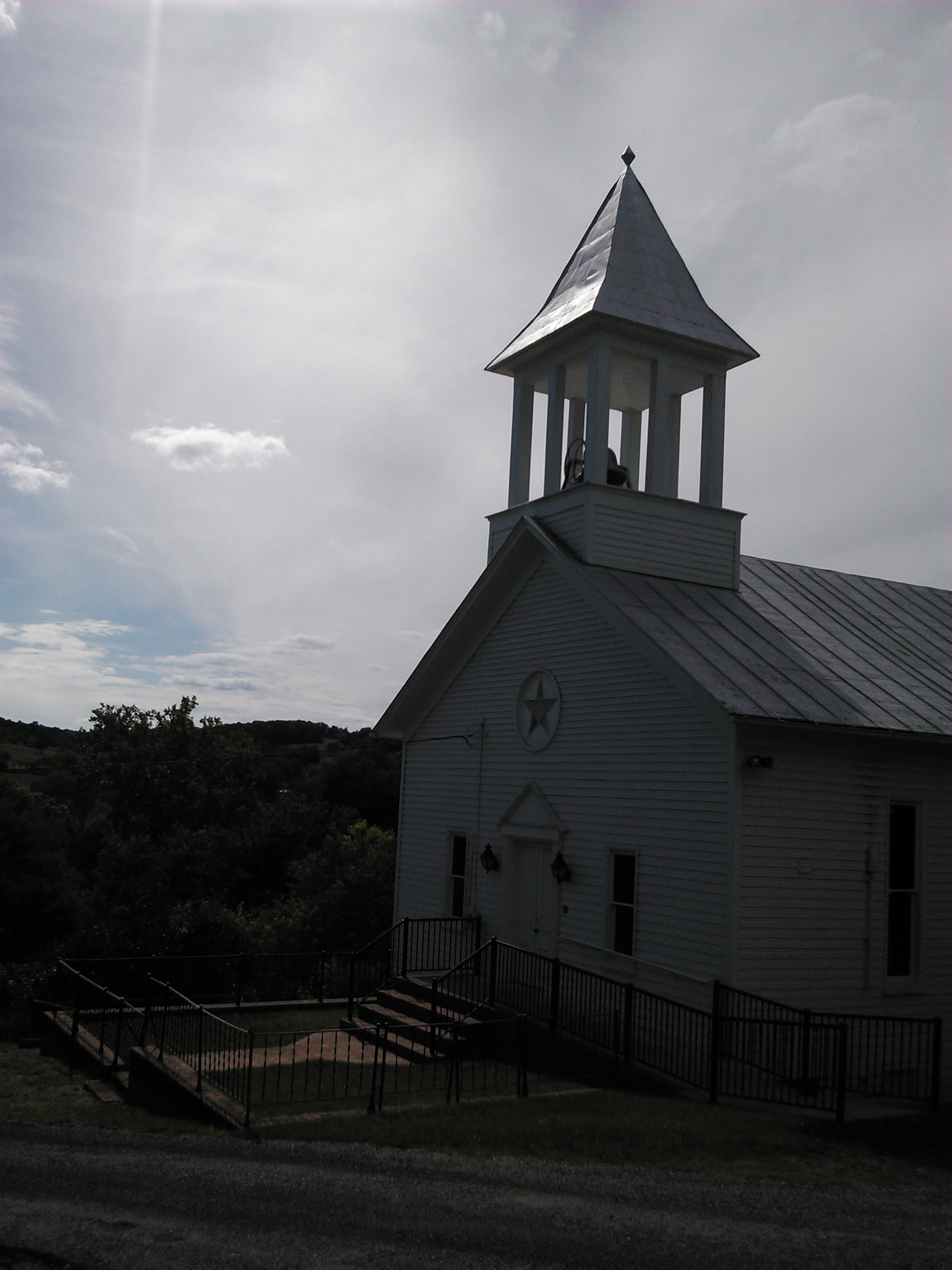
- The former Methodist church sits in the center of the rural village.
- Interactive map of Mount Clifton, Virginia
- Coordinates: 38°49′7″N 78°45′47″W
- Country: United States
- State: Virginia
- County: Shenandoah

Area
  - Total: 0.400 sq mi (1.036 km^{2})
  - Land: 0.3800018 sq mi (0.9842002 km^{2})
  - Water: 0.0200000 sq mi (0.0517998 km^{2})

Population (2020)
  - Total: 110
  - Density: 290/sq mi (110/km^{2})
- Time zone: UTC−5 (Eastern (EST))
  - Summer (DST): UTC−4 (EDT)
- FIPS code: 51-04928

Mount Clifton is a census-designated place in Shenandoah County, in the U.S. state of Virginia. As of the 2020 decennial census the village was noted as having 110 residents with 6 being Native American or Alaska Native, 1 being Asian, 0 Black or African American individuals, 7 of Hispanic or Latino descent, 0 Native Hawaiian and Pacific Islanders, 4 of Some Other Race, 8 of Two or More Races, and 91 White. It was also noted as having 54 housing units, 3 of which are noted as being vacant.

Mt. Clifton most likely got its name from its imposing position overlooking Mill Creek. It was founded sometime in the middle of the 19th century by George Hammon and his sons. They built and operated a store, flour mill, saw mill, and blacksmith shop in the area.

Soon after the Hammon’s arrival the Howard’s Lick Turnpike, the major road from Mt. Jackson to Orkney Springs and West Virginia, opened. A toll house was constructed in Mt. Clifton and the community became a rest stop for the many visitors traveling to resorts in Orkney Springs or West Virginia.

Like in other small communities in the area, commercial, social, educational, and spiritual institutions emerged. These include:

- The Mt. Clifton Methodist Church, constructed in 1884.
- The Mt. Clifton Store, constructed around 1900.
- The Mt. Clifton School, the first of which opened in 1852.
- The Mt. Clifton Odd-Fellows, organized in the early 19th century.
- The Mt. Clifton Mill, which first began operating in 1813.
- The Mt. Clifton Post Office, which opened in 1850 and was located in the local store.

Today, the commercial activities of the community have ceased long ago. The Mt. Clifton Post Office ceased operations in 1900. Both the mill and school shut down in the mid-1940s, followed by the closure of the last remaining store a few decades later.

The church closed in 2020 and most of the structures that once surrounded it are abandoned or demolished.

== Demographics ==
Mount Clifton first appeared as a census designated place in the 2020 U.S. census.
