= Shrine Mont =

Episcopal Diocese of Virginia conference center

Coordinates: 38.7954°N 78.8147°W

Shrine Mout

Shrine Mont is a retreat and conference center owned by the Episcopal Diocese of Virginia in the town of Orkney Springs, Virginia, United States which is located at the foot of Great North Mountain in the Shenandoah Valley and at the edge of the George Washington National Forest. It includes about 1,100 acres of forest.

The church at Shrine Mont is the Cathedral Shrine of the Transfiguration, an open-air sanctuary consecrated in 1925. Each of its stones was pulled by horse or rolled by local people from the mountain that embraces it. The baptismal font was originally a dugout stone used by Native Americans to grind corn.

It also includes The Virginia House (formerly known as the Orkney Springs Hotel) which is listed in the National Register of Historic Places and was purchased by Shrine Mont in 1979. With its white clapboard structure and tall, green-shuttered windows, The Virginia House is four stories high. The 96,000 square-foot structure was built in 1873 and restored in 1987.

== History ==
Entrance sign at Shrine Mont

A short distance from Shrine Mont are seven springs where discovered relics indicate a Native American settlement was once located. The spring waters were said to have healing powers and visitors started to come to the area in the mid-1800s. Several hotels were built including the Orkney Springs Hotel which was started in the 1850s. In the late 1800s, Episcopal church services were held in the hotel, often by the Sixth Bishop of Virginia, Robert Atkinson Gibson. In 1902, the Bishop purchased a cottage called Tanglewood for his summer residence and soon decided to establish year-round worship at Orkney Springs. Bishop Gibson died in 1919 and shortly after his death, the Shrine of the Transfiguration was built on part of what had been his land and next to it, the Shelter Chapel. Eventually Tanglewood, with all its buildings, became the heart of Shrine Mont.

The Shrine was built by his son-in-law, the Rev. Edmund Lee Woodward. He and his wife purchased land at Orkney Springs and spent their vacations there each year. He cut down 100 trees to clear the area and built a log cabin (named Gibson Cottage), which was finished in 1928 when they took up permanent residence.

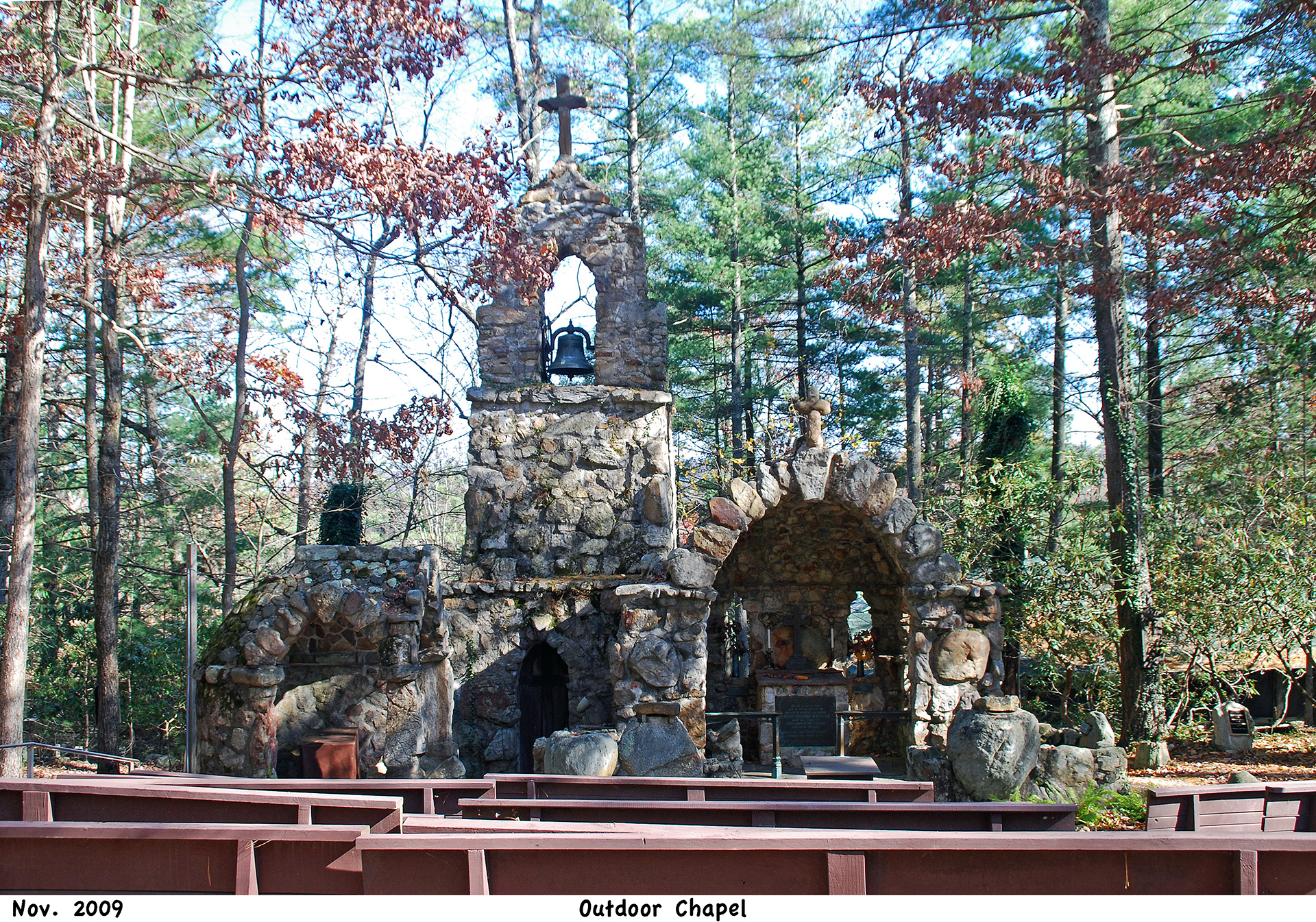
Cathedral Shrine of the Transfiguration

The Shrine was built from 1924 to 1925 in the space of a natural amphitheater. It includes a bell tower, a sacristy, a shrine crossing, choir and clergy stalls, a pulpit, a font and a lectern. At the consecration in 1925, a Deed of Donation was presented by the Woodwards which conveyed the land on which the cabin and shrine were built to the Diocese of Virginia. Henry St. George Tucker (bishop) then appointed Woodward rector of the shrine for life or until he resigned.

In 1928, after Woodward took up permanent residence, he planned a retreat which could accommodate 120 guests. Bishop Tucker approved the plan provided that it was not included in the diocesan budget. Woodward would construct various buildings and a swimming pool. He also purchased houses and buildings built by others to create cottages, plus a refectory and kitchen.

In 1929, more land was acquired from the Orkney Springs Hotel.

After Dr Woodward's death in 1948, the Diocese appointed Wilmer E. Moomaw as director manager and Rev. Francis Tyndall as temporary chaplain and director. Later, Rev. Tucker became dean of the Cathedral Shrine of the Transfiguration and chaplain of Shrine Mont.

In 1950, Moomaw was appointed Director of Shrine Mont with full responsibility for the operation and development of the property, and for the physical care and protection of the Shrine. Moomaw served as Director until 1988. During his tenure, he improved and renovated the entire property, adding new facilities and increasing the number of people attending, and thus broadening the scope of its operation.

== Notable people ==
- Author Armistead Maupin spent time with his family at Shrine Mont as a teenager.
