= Weyers Cave, Virginia =

- CDP
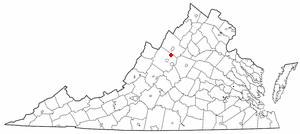
- Location of Weyers Cave, Virginia
- Coordinates: 38°17′13″N 78°54′50″W
- Country: United States
- State: Virginia
- County: Augusta

Area
  - Total: 6.6 sq mi (17.1 km^{2})
  - Land: 6.6 sq mi (17.1 km^{2})
  - Water: 0 sq mi (0.0 km^{2})
- Elevation: 1,161 ft (354 m)

Population (2020)
  - Total: 2,700
  - Density: 375/sq mi (144.6/km^{2})
- Time zone: UTC−5 (Eastern (EST))
  - Summer (DST): UTC−4 (EDT)
- ZIP code: 24486
- Area code: 540
- FIPS code: 51-85184
- GNIS feature ID: 1496397

Weyers Cave (/ˈwɪərz/ WEERZ) is a census-designated place (CDP) in Augusta County, Virginia, United States. The population was 2,700 at the 2020 census. It is part of the Staunton–Waynesboro Micropolitan Statistical Area. The town gained its name as the closest railway stop to Weyer's Cave, now Grand Caverns, in Grottoes.

Weyers Cave is the site of the first chapter (1927) of the Future Farmers of Virginia, later to become the National FFA Organization. It is also the site of Shenandoah Valley Regional Airport and the main campus of Blue Ridge Community College.

== History ==
The West View Schoolhouse and Weyers Cave School are listed on the National Register of Historic Places.

== Geography ==
Weyers Cave is located at 38°17′13″N 78°54′50″W (38.286833, −78.913977).

According to the United States Census Bureau, the CDP has a total area of 6.6 square miles (17.1 km^{2}), all land.

== Demographics ==
Historical population
Census	Pop.	Note	%±
2000	1,225		—
2020	2,700		—
U.S. Decennial Census; 2000 2010 2020

Weyers Cave was first listed as a census designated place in the 2000 U.S. census.

=== 2000 census ===
As of the census of 2000, there were 1,225 people, 462 households, and 354 families residing in the CDP. The population density was 185.1 people per square mile (71.4/km^{2}). There were 490 housing units at an average density of 74.1/sq mi (28.6/km^{2}). The racial makeup of the CDP was 96.73% White, 0.90% African American, 0.08% Asian, 0.98% from other races, and 1.31% from two or more races. Hispanic or Latino of any race were 0.73% of the population.

There were 462 households, out of which 35.5% had children under the age of 18 living with them, 66.9% were married couples living together, 6.1% had a female householder with no husband present, and 23.2% were non-families. 19.7% of all households were made up of individuals, and 6.1% had someone living alone who was 65 years of age or older. The average household size was 2.65 and the average family size was 3.06.

In the CDP the population was spread out, with 27.0% under the age of 18, 6.4% from 18 to 24, 30.4% from 25 to 44, 24.8% from 45 to 64, and 11.3% who were 65 years of age or older. The median age was 37 years. For every 100 females there were 104.5 males. For every 100 females age 18 and over, there were 96.5 males.

The median income for a household in the CDP was $39,833, and the median income for a family was $42,457. Males had a median income of $31,299 versus $22,132 for females. The per capita income for the CDP was $16,837. About 12.0% of families and 9.5% of the population were below the poverty line, including 9.1% of those under age 18 and 4.7% of those age 65 or over.

=== 2010 ===
As of the census of 2010, there were 2,473 people, and 910 households residing in the CDP. The racial makeup of the CDP was 85.3% White, 1.8% African American, 0.06% Asian, 0.1% from other races, and 1.7% from two or more races. Hispanic or Latino of any race were 10.5% of the population.

== Notable people ==
- Quin Houff- NASCAR driver
- Ananias Davisson- Religious music composer
