= Virginia Living =

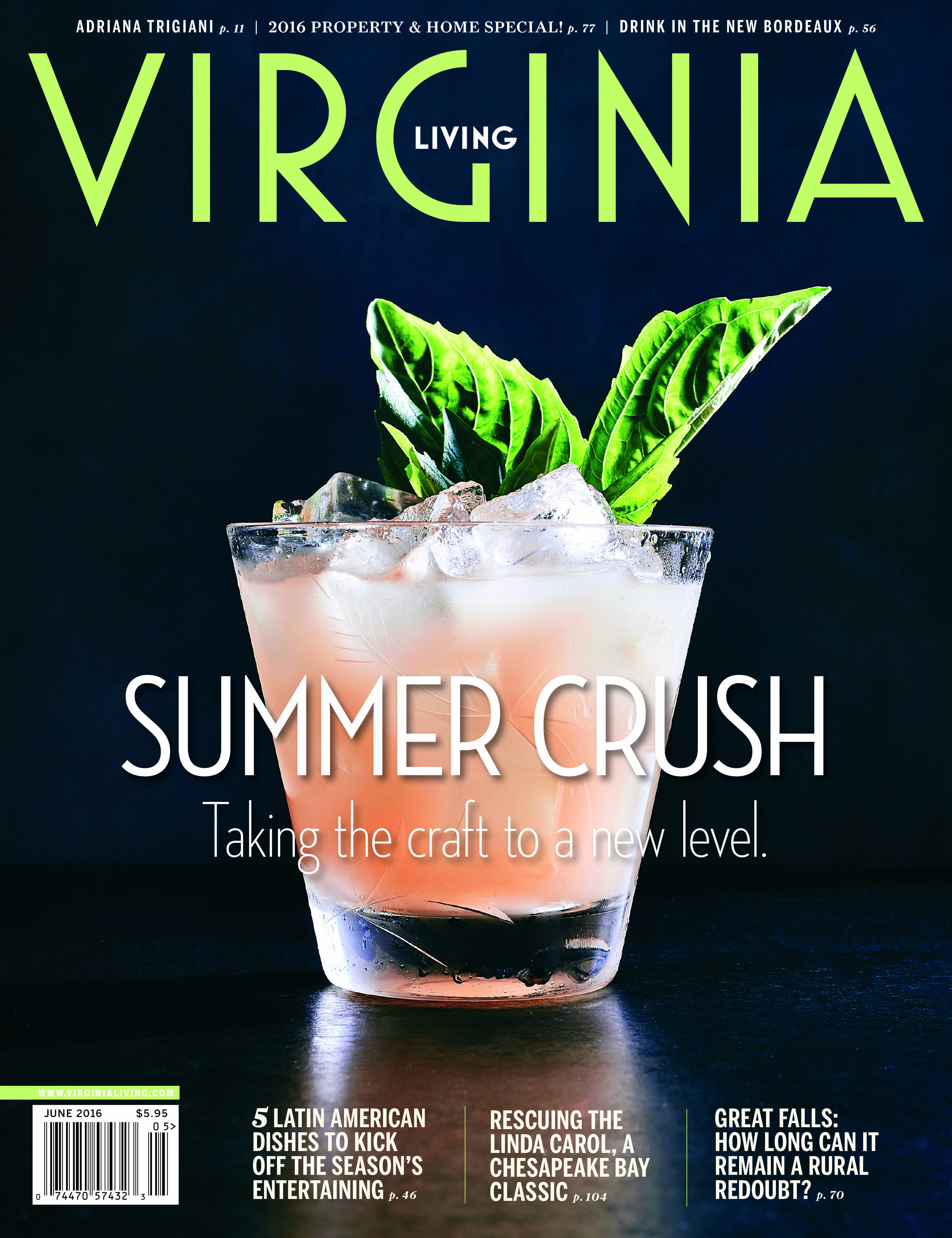
- June 2016 Virginia Living cover
- Editor: Erin Parkhurst
- Categories: Culture & Lifestyle
- Frequency: Bimonthly
- Founder: John-Lawrence Smith, Publisher
- First issue: December 2002
- Company: Cape Fear Publishing
- Country: USA
- Based in: Richmond, Virginia
- Language: English
- Website: www.virginialiving.com

Virginia Living is a glossy bimonthly regional lifestyle magazine with a focus on all things Virginia. Founded in 2002, it is the only statewide lifestyle magazine in Virginia.

The magazine features articles on topics such as food and drink, home and garden, arts and culture, travel, weddings, events, and Virginia-related history. The results of its annual readers' survey are published in "Best of Virginia," which appears alongside the May/June issue and includes first, second and third-place winners in 100 distinct categories covering all five regions of the state: Central Virginia, Eastern Virginia, Northern Virginia, Southwest Virginia, and Shenandoah Valley.

The magazine is headquartered in Richmond, Virginia.
