= Orkney Springs Hotel =

- U.S. National Register of Historic Places
- Virginia Landmarks Register
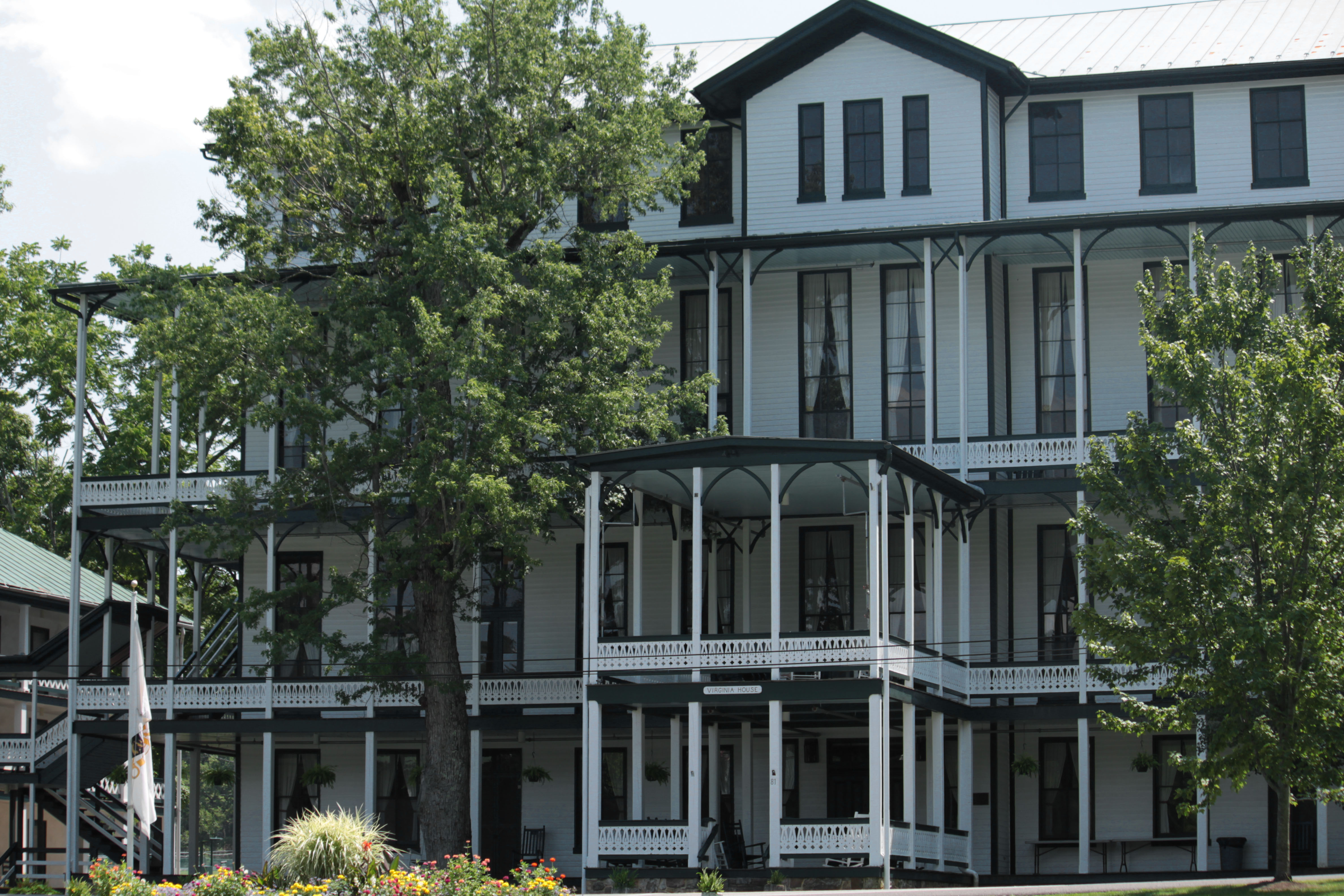
- Orkney Springs Hotel, October 2010

- Location within Virginia Location within the United States
- Location: VA 263, W of jct. with VA 610, Orkney Springs, Virginia
- Coordinates: 38°47′41″N 78°48′56″W
- Area: 20 acres (8.1 ha)
- Built: 1853
- NRHP reference No.: 76002119
- VLR No.: 085-0039

Significant dates
- Added to NRHP: April 22, 1976
- Designated VLR: March 18, 1975

Orkney Springs Hotel is a historic resort spa complex located at Orkney Springs, Shenandoah County, Virginia. The oldest building, known as Maryland House, was built in 1853, and is a two-story, rectangular stuccoed frame building. It is faced on all sides by double galleries. The main hotel building, known as Virginia House, was built between 1873 and 1876. It is a four-story, stuccoed frame, H-shaped building measuring 100 feet by 165 feet and features a three-story verandah. The hotel contains 175 bedrooms. The remaining contributing resources are the three-story Pennsylvania House (1867), seven identical two-story, six-room, hipped roof cottages, and a small columned pavilion located next to the mineral springs.

It was listed on the National Register of Historic Places in 1976. It is currently owned by the Episcopal Diocese of Virginia, which operates it and several surrounding buildings as Shrine Mont, a retreat center which also contains the diocese's Cathedral Shrine of the Transfiguration.
