= Orkney Springs, Virginia =

- Unincorporated community Census designated place
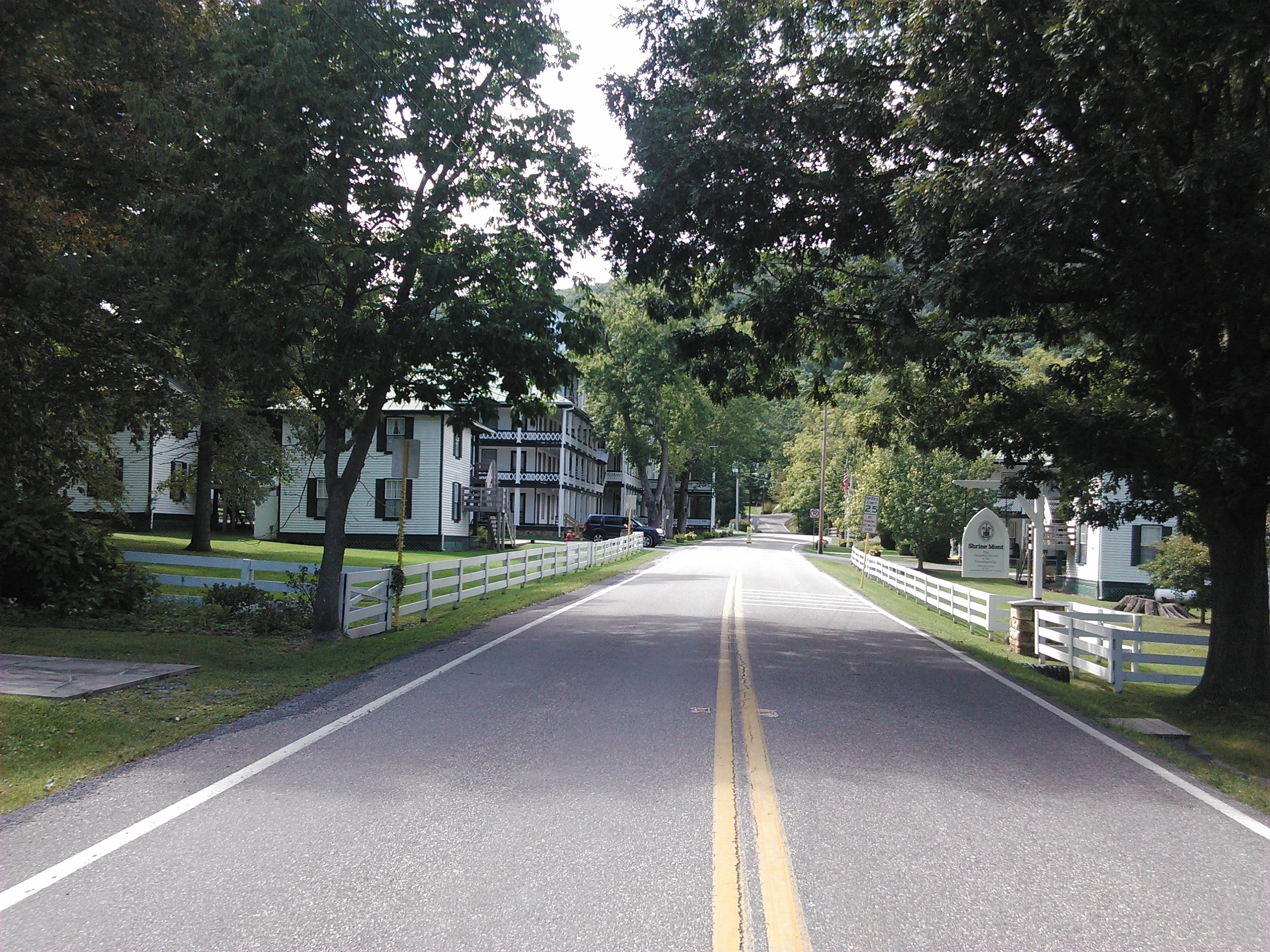
- Main hotel building on left

- Location within the Commonwealth of Virginia Orkney Springs (the United States)
- Coordinates: 38°47′43″N 78°48′53″W
- Country: United States
- State: Virginia
- County: Shenandoah
- Time zone: UTC−5 (Eastern (EST))
  - Summer (DST): UTC−4 (EDT)
- ZIP code: 22845
- Area code: 540

Orkney Springs is an unincorporated community and census designated place (CDP) in western Shenandoah County, Virginia, United States. The reason for the name "Orkney" is unknown, but believed to be tied to either the Orkney Islands off the coast of Scotland or to the Earl of Orkney, since one of the earliest European landowners was Dr. John McDonald, a Scottish physician. The "Springs" part of the name comes from the numerous underground mineral springs in the area.

== History ==
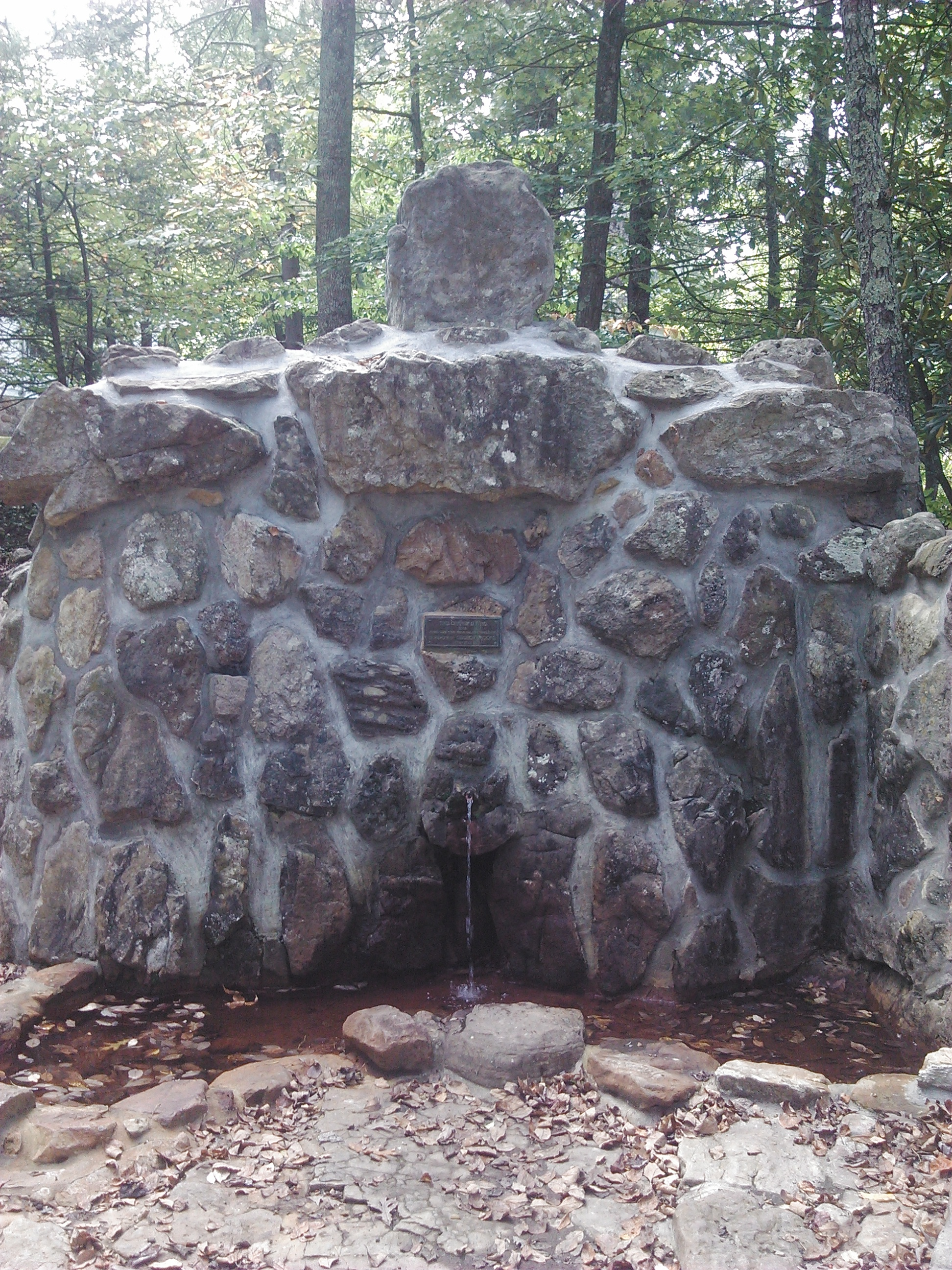
Orkney spring

Major Peter Higgins laid out the town in 1808, with a common area surrounded by lots; later archeological research found relics of prior Native American use of the site.

In January 1864 Maj. Gen. Fitzhugh Lee's Confederate cavalry and McNeill's Partisan Rangers camped in Orkney Springs.

The first public hotel was built in the early 19th century, as tourists arrived to sample the healing waters. Those private hotels on the former common green consolidated into the Orkney Springs Hotel. Most of the original buildings still stand, have been restored, and are in use today. The Orkney Springs Hotel was listed on the National Register of Historic Places in 1976, and its most current restoration finished in 1987. The Virginia House is believed to be the largest wooden structure in Virginia. It dates to the 1870s and is on the National Historical Register. The Maryland House dates to the mid-1850s, but collapsed and was rebuilt after the Civil War. The Orkney Springs Hotel was owned privately until 1979 when it was purchased by the Episcopal Diocese of Virginia and became part of their retreat center Shrine Mont.

The Episcopal Church had offered services in the town since the 19th century, and it had been a favorite retreat of Bishop Robert Atkinson Gibson from 1876 until his death in 1919. Bishop Gibson purchased a cottage in town which he called Tanglewood, and refitted an abandoned schoolhouse as a chapel. They became the heart of Shrine Mont, after his son-in-law, Rev. Edmund Lee Woodward, M.D. (a former medical missionary to China), built another cottage and what became the diocese's Cathedral Shrine of the Transfiguration and donated them to the diocese. This open-air outdoor worship space, built of native stone, was consecrated on August 6, 1925, by Bishop William Cabell Brown. The retreat center continued to purchase buildings in the town, including the hotel in 1979. Shrine Mont now hosts conferences and retreats, especially from March–November, as well as many family reunions, summer camps for children and teenagers. Multiple worship services are held in the cathedral on Sundays. Shrine Mont also hosts the annual Shenandoah Valley Music Festival, from July until Labor Day.

== Demographics ==
Historical population
Census	Pop.	Note	%±
U.S. Decennial Census

The United States Census Bureau first defined Orkney Springs as a census designated place in 2023.
