= St. James's Episcopal Church (Richmond, Virginia) =

Coordinates: 37.551362°N 77.456511°W

St James' Church
- The Parish Church of Saint James
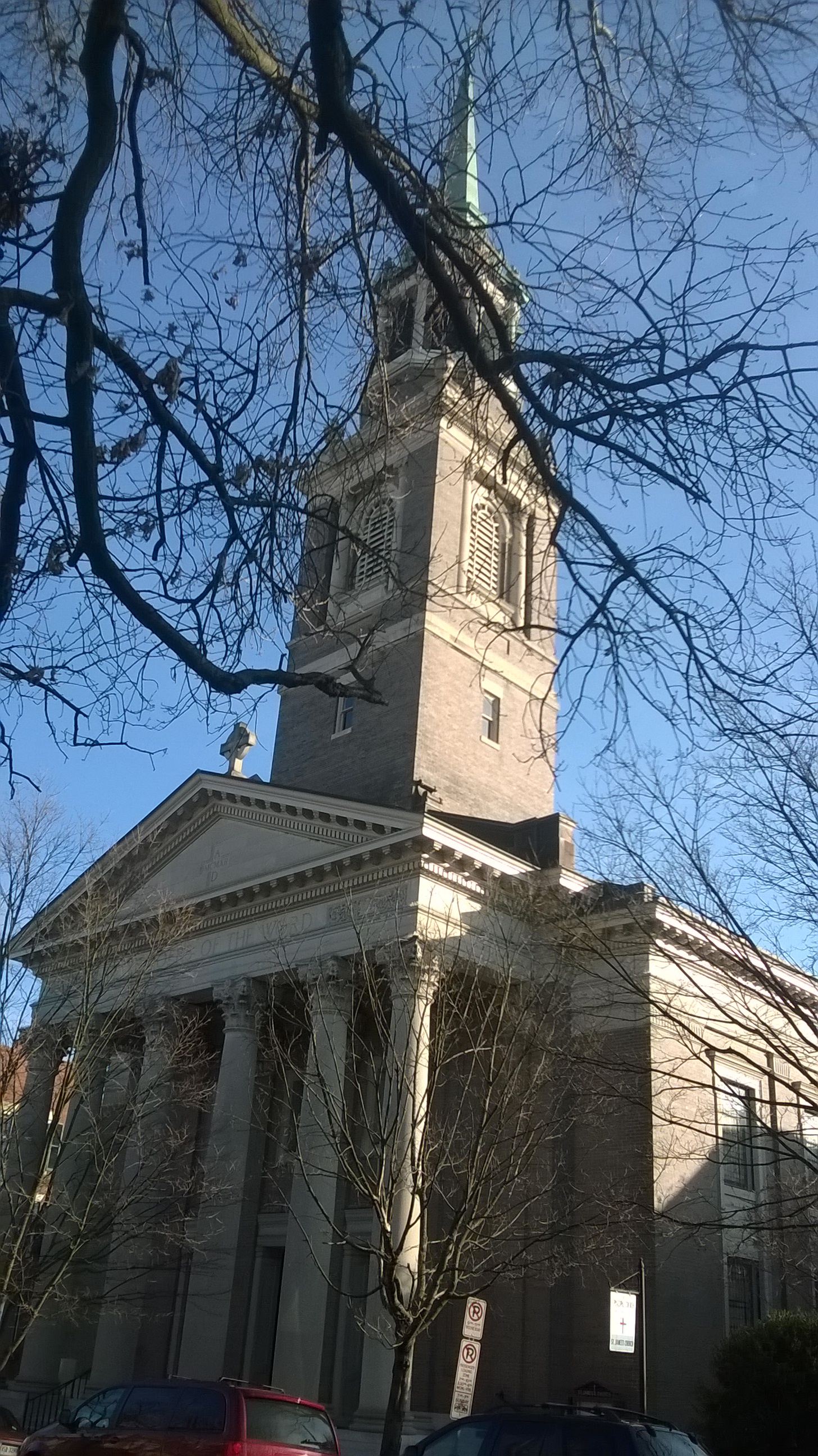
- St James' Church
- Location: 1205 W. Franklin St., Richmond, Virginia 23220
- Country: United States
- Denomination: Episcopal Church
- Churchmanship: Broad church
- Website: https://www.stjamessrva.org/

History
- Founded: 1835
- Founder: The Rev. Adam Empie
- Dedication: St. James
- Dedicated: 1918

Architecture
- Architect(s): Noland and Baskerville
- Style: English Renaissance
- Years built: 1839, 1912, 1997

Administration
- Diocese: Virginia
- Parish: St. James Richmond

Clergy
- Rector: The Rev. Beth Franklin; The Rev. Kyle Babin (interim associate rector)

St. James's Episcopal Church is the third oldest Episcopal congregation in Richmond, Virginia. Only the older St. John's Episcopal Church on Church Hill also remains an active congregation. The church reported 3046 members in 2016 and 2,888 members in 2023; no membership statistics were reported nationally in 2024 parochial reports. Plate and pledge income reported for the congregation in 2024 was $2,214,334. Average Sunday attendance (ASA) in 2024 was 304 persons.

The parish takes as its motto, emblazoned above the altar: "Be ye doers of the Word and not hearers only," ascribed to early Christian bishop James the Just, James 1:22. However, its seal includes three scallop shells, traditional symbols of the pilgrim St. James the Greater. Other symbols on the parish's seal include: a star symbolizing Epiphany and the collect for the First Sunday after Epiphany ("Grant (O Lord) that we may both perceive and know what things (we) ought to do, and may also have grace and power faithfully to fulfill the same"), a pelican pecking its breast (to symbolize Christ's sacrifice as well as the Eucharist), and a fish and loaf (both symbolizing Christ and the gospel story of the loaves and fishes of which at least St. James the Greater was witness).

== History ==
In 1831, several Episcopalians petitioned bishop Richard Channing Moore to create a church on Shockoe Hill, since both of Richmond's existing Episcopal Churches were on the other side of the growing state capital. In 1835, the first year of the publication of the Southern Churchman, they bought at lot at 5th and Marshall Streets and soon erected a Sunday School building (one of the founders, John Williams, a devout Irish immigrant and merchant had been Monumental Church's Sunday School superintendent). In 1837, they called the Rev. Adam Empie, formerly rector of Williamburg's Bruton Church and president of the College of William and Mary to become their rector, and he held the congregation's first services that November. On April 2, 1838 they laid the cornerstone for their new church, which Bishop Moore (also Monumental Church's rector) consecrated on June 23, 1839.

After Empie retired for health and financial reasons to North Carolina, the next rector was George Cummins, a powerful preacher and writer, who also supported the American Colonization Society. Rev. Cummins left to accept a position at Trinity Episcopal Church in Washington, D.C., then in 1866 was consecrated assistant bishop of Kentucky, but he broke away in protest against what he perceived as the church's increasing ritualization, to form the Reformed Episcopal Church in 1874.

The Richmond congregation's next rector, Joshua Peterkin (1814–1892), son of an officer from Baltimore who served in both the Army and Navy, led the parish from 1855 until his death 37 years later, assisted by several young priests, including his son, George William Peterkin, who became the first bishop of the Diocese of West Virginia. Rev. Joshua Peterkin had been known for his solicitude toward African Americans, having first served at St. James African Church in Baltimore shortly after graduating from Virginia Theological Seminary. However, like his two predecessors, Peterkin owned slaves. This church was originally located about a block from Richmond's slave market and built a gallery for African-American congregants. Nonetheless, like his Bishop William Meade, Rev. Peterkin believed in educating all races, and soon reestablished the school to teach African Americans which Dr. Empie had established in 1845.

Rev. Peterkin's secessionist sermon in January 1861 prompted protest from Unionist lawyer and representative John Minor Botts. However, another parishioner Henry A. Wise (Virginia's 33rd Governor, serving from 1856 to 1860), as one of his last official acts, refused to save the life of John Brown, captured after his raid on Harpers Ferry (then in Virginia). The St. James congregation, which had been Richmond's largest at the start of the American Civil War, lost many parishioners, including General J.E.B. Stuart, killed at the Battle of Yellow Tavern in 1864. Gov. Wise's son (and brother of the assistant Rev. Wise), Capt. O. Jennings Wise died in 1862 under his father's command at the Battle of Roanoke Island. Parishioner Sally Tompkins established a private hospital to nurse Confederate casualties, and when those were outlawed, accepted a commission so her work could continue (thus becoming the Confederate Army's only female officer, as well as being so skilled that only 73 of 1,333 soldiers admitted to her care succumbed to wounds or disease by 1865). Rev. Peterkin's wife Elisa, and daughter Rebekah Dulaney Peterkin, also helped nurse the wounded during the war, and remained active in charitable work in Richmond during the following decades.

The church survived Richmond's Evacuation Fire in April 1865, but the devastation to the city took away the livelihoods of many parishioners. The Peterkins founded the first Virginia circle (chapter) of the International Order of the King's Daughters and Sons as well as the city's Sheltering Arms Hospital, to serve those unable to afford medical care for lack of both insurance and military pensions, consistent with the Social Gospel movement. Also, in 1875, parishioner Frederick W. Hanewinckel donated a home for the benefit of indigent Episcopal women, on whose board Mrs. Peterkin served for many years. In 1894, parishioner Mary Tinsley Greenhow founded the Virginia Home for Incurables, as well as continued the recently deceased Rebekah Peterkin's work at Sheltering Arms Hospital for decades.

Rev. Peterkin, like his mentor (then assistant) Bishop John Johns, actively supported foreign and domestic missions. He and his assistants helped establish three other Richmond parishes: St. Mark's, Moore Memorial (commemorating Virginia's second bishop, but later combined and renamed Grace and Holy Trinity), and St. Philip's (Richmond's first black Episcopal parish, formed from members of the Sunday school and on North Fourth Street only blocks away from St. James). The parish also founded a church mission to Brazil in 1889, sending James Morris and Lucien Lee Kinsolving (who became the first bishop of the Anglican Episcopal Church of Brazil). Former assistant Robert A. Gibson would later become Bishop of Virginia, and former assistant James R. Winchester later became Bishop of Arkansas.

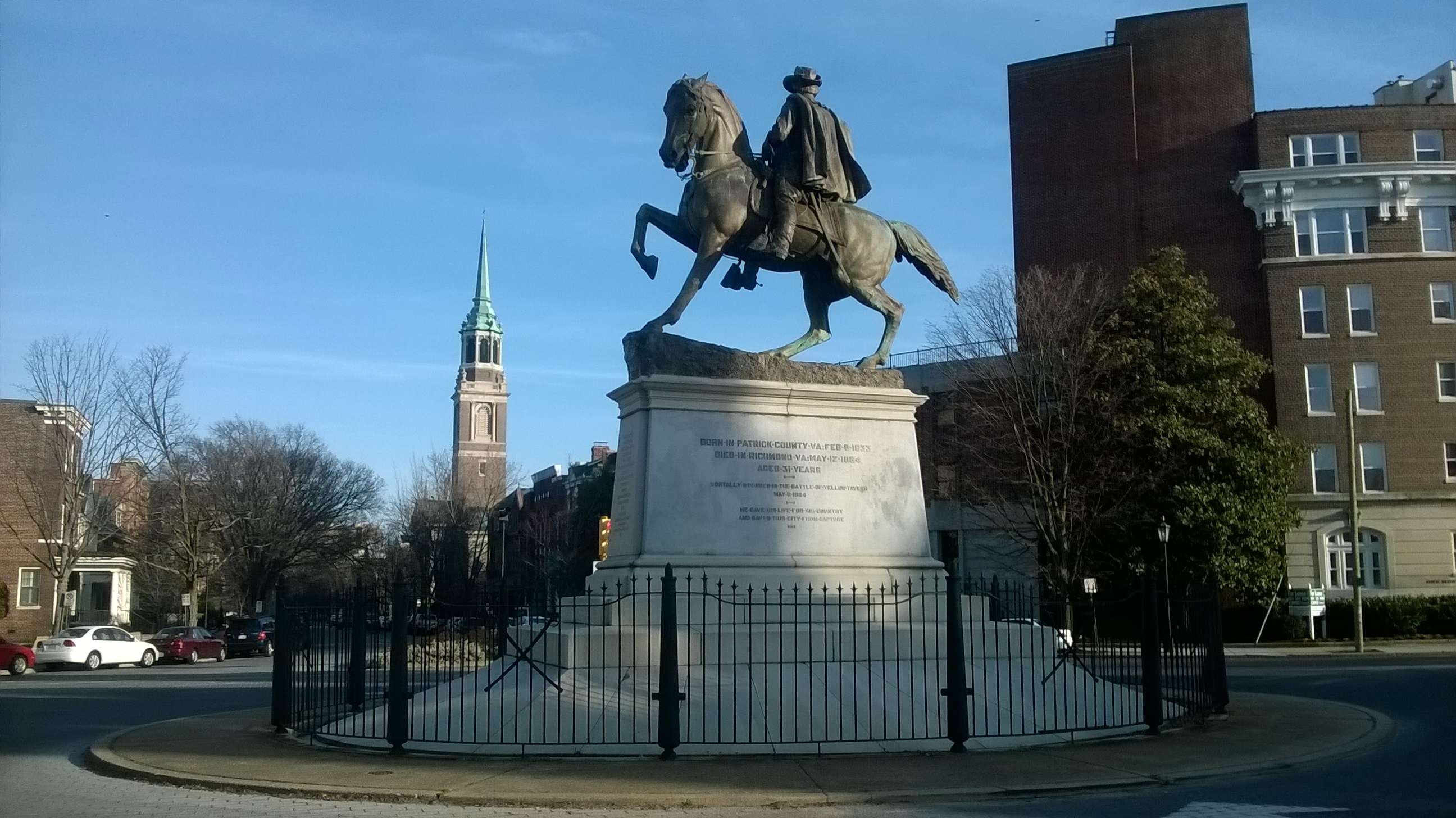
view of St. James Episcopal Church as relocated to Stuart Circle

After Rev. Peterkin's death, his successor, Rev. John K. Mason, advocated moving the church to the city's west end, the Fan District then being developed and the existing structure needing considerable repairs, even after donations made in connection with the General Convention held in Richmond in 1907. Rev. Mason accepted a position in Louisville, Kentucky, but after two prominent churchmen declined to become his successor due to the increasingly isolated location of the church (and the new nearby street railroad disrupting services), his dream was realized under his successor, Rev. William Meade Clark (who also served as editor of the Southern Churchman). The cornerstone for the current building, near Stuart Circle and Monument Avenue, was laid on May 17, 1912, and the future structure consecrated by Bishop Robert A. Gibson. Rt.Rev. George Peterkin also spoke.

Under the next rector, Rev. Freeland G. Peter, a Men's Club (the Brotherhood of St. Andrew) and Business Women's Club were formed. The new building was consecrated in 1918, the ceremony having been delayed until the debt incurred in its construction was liquidated. Bishop Gibson officiated and bishop William Cabell Brown preached concerning the congregation's motto, with the President of the Episcopal Board of Missions, Rt.Rev. Arthur Selden Lloyd also preaching at an evening service. The Women's Auxiliary sponsored Margaret Monteiro, a Richmonder who became a missionary in China, from 1920 until she evacuated in 1948. In 1926, longtime vestry member Henry Lee Valentine donated chimes, named after the brotherhood of which he was a member, and whose daily peals became a local tradition. Rev. Freeland Peter left the parish to become canon at the National Cathedral in Washington, D.C., and his Maryland home became part of the National Institutes of Health.

Rev. Churchill J. Gibson was the next long-term rector, serving from October 1929 until his retirement in April 1957 (shortly after the congregation expanded the Sunday School building and renamed it in his honor). Rev. Richard Royall Baker III, in addition to his duties in this parish and dealing with racial tension in the city, during his 21-year rectorship helped establish St. Martin's Church in Richmond, as well as cooperated with nearby Catholic, United Church of Christ, Lutheran and Presbyterian churches, sometimes calling the result Stuart Circle Parish. In 1986, under rector Frank Fagan, the St. James Children's Center opened, the only preschool in the city to welcome children with special needs.

On July 13, 1994, lightning struck the church, destroying the altar and nave, leaving only its four walls standing. During an emergency meeting held that night at neighboring Grace and Holy Trinity Church, the vestry committed to rebuilding the church, remaining a vital ministry to downtown Richmond and the surrounding Fan area. During the parish's 150th anniversary celebrations, the congregation decided to alter a portion of the parish's seal—replacing a blank section with tongues of flame, which also allude to the parish's traditional devotion to the Holy Spirit.

Under the leadership of then-rector Reverend Robert Trache, the sanctuary of the church was rebuilt and rededicated in 1997, and now includes C. B. Fisk's Opus 112, one of the finest pipe organs in North America. Following Mr. Trache, in 2000 the Reverend Randolph Hollerith was called as the 13th rector of St. James's. Under Mr. Hollerith, the church expanded its educational campus across Birch Street to 1133 West Franklin, incorporating and expanding two single family dwellings into The Michaux House, which serves as a meeting, classroom and community service space. In 2016, Mr. Hollerith was called as Dean of the National Cathedral in Washington. D.C. In June 2017, the vestry of St. James's called the Reverend Dr. John F. McCard of Atlanta's St-Martin-in-the-Fields Episcopal Church as 14th Rector of St. James's.

In September of 2026, the vestry called The Rev. Beth Franklin as the 15th Rector of St. James's, and the first female rector in the parish's history.

== Architecture ==
The current building in Richmond's Fan District was designed by the Richmond architectural firm of Nolan and Baskerville in 1912, following the exterior design of its predecessor at 5th and Marshall as well as St. Martin-in-the-Fields in London. The same firm also designed Temple Beth Ahabah (where the congregation worshiped temporarily after the 1994 fire) and the Jefferson Davis monument on Monument Avenue. The women of the church in 1895 donated the brass pulpit as a memorial to Rev. Joshua Peterkin, although vestryman and Richmond sculptor Edward Valentine detested its "vulgarity". Several other pieces moved from the original to the new church did not survive the 1994 fire. Four original pews survived; the remainder are reproductions crafted in New Holland, Pennsylvania. Richmond's firefighters managed to save the nave's ten stained glass windows, four from the Louis C. Tiffany studios, and it also received three sets of 19th century panels (from the M.T.Lamb studios in Brooklyn, New York) from the Monumental Church, which was at the time being restored to its original state as a memorial to those who died in the Great Theater Fire of 1811. Also, in 1951 the United Daughters of the Confederacy donated stained glass windows memorializing General J. E. B. Stuart, and, a century after her death, another commemorating Capt. Sally Tompkins.
