= Peterkin (surname) =

Peterkin is a surname, alternatively spelled Peterken. It is a medieval diminutive of the given name Peter. Notable people with the surname include:

- Alexander Peterkin (1781–1846), Scottish writer
- Daisy Ann Peterkin (1884–1952), a dancer professionally known as Mademoiselle Dazie
- Elizabeth Helen Peterken, the birth name of Betsy McCaughey, an American politician
- Freddie Lee Peterkin, an American singer-songwriter
- George William Peterkin (1841–1916), the first Episcopal bishop of West Virginia
- Jamie Peterkin, b. 1982, a Saint Lucian Olympic swimmer
- Julia Peterkin (1880–1961), a South Carolina fiction writer
- Dr. Michael Peterkin, the founder of the Pierro winery in Australia
- Major-General Peter Grant Peterkin, b. 1947, a retired British army officer
- Rebekah Dulaney Peterkin (1847–1891), an American philanthropist
- Wilbur J. Peterkin (1904–1996), an American military officer.
- Thomas Peterkin, the Mayor of Lower Hutt (1907 - 1909)

== Fictional characters ==
- Peterkin Gay, a character in the novel The Coral Island, 1858
- The Peterkins, an impractical family in The Peterkin Papers, 1880
- Peterkin, a cartoon satyr in Scrambled Eggs, a 1939 film
