= Sheltering Arms Hospital (West Virginia) =

Former hospital

See article Sheltering Arms Hospital for other hospitals with the name located in Richmond, Virginia and Minneapolis, Minnesota.

Sheltering Arms Hospital, Hansford, West Virginia

Sheltering Arms Hospital was located at Hansford in Kanawha County, West Virginia, east of Charleston on the Chesapeake and Ohio Railway along Paint Creek. It was open from 1888 until 1923. The nursing school was added in 1902.

The Episcopal Diocese of West Virginia opened the hospital in 1888, under the leadership of its first bishop, the Rt. Rev. George W. Peterkin. At the time, there was only one other hospital in the state; his sister Rebekah Dulaney Peterkin founded a similar hospital in Richmond. Among the West Virginia organizers were William Nelson Page, a civil and mining engineer and coal mine manager of Ansted and Major Thomas L. Broun of Kanawha County.

Sheltering Arms Hospital was supported by small payroll deductions, initially 10 cents a month, from coal miners and railroad workers. When a new building was opened in 1908, it contained 100 beds, and Sheltering Arms could care for 800 patients. The hospital had its own nursing school. Under hospital policy, "Persons with contagious diseases, or those caused by immoral habits, not received."

The Sheltering Arms Hospital in West Virginia closed in 1923 after its services were replaced by county hospitals.

Dr. Otis K. Rice donated papers from the hospital to the West Virginia state archives. He coauthored a book with Wayne Williams, A History of the Sheltering Arms Hospital.
