= William C. Campbell =

William C. Campbell may refer to:

- William C. Campbell (golfer) (1923–2013), American golfer
- William C. Campbell (scientist) (born 1930), Irish biochemist and Nobel laureate

== See also ==
- Wilburn C. Campbell (1910–1997), Episcopal bishop of West Virginia
