= Robert P. Atkinson =

American Episcopalian bishop (1927–2012)

The Right Reverend Robert P. Atkinson D.D.
- Bishop of West Virginia
- Province: Episcopal Church
- Diocese: West Virginia
- Elected: February 17, 1973
- In office: 1976–1988
- Predecessor: Wilburn C. Campbell
- Successor: John H. Smith
- Other post: Assistant Bishop of Virginia (1989-1993)
- Previous post: Coadjutor Bishop of West Virginia (1973-1976)

Orders
- Ordination: February 24, 1954 by Robert E. L. Strider Sr.
- Consecration: May 6, 1973 by John E. Hines

Personal details
- Born: November 16, 1927 Washington, D.C., U.S.
- Died: July 4, 2012 (aged 84) Jacksonville, Florida, U.S.
- Buried: Emmanuel Church (Greenwood, Virginia)
- Denomination: Anglican
- Parents: William Henry Atkinson & Anna Poland
- Spouse: Rosemary Clemence (m. August 8, 1953)
- Children: 3

Robert Poland Atkinson (November 16, 1927 – July 4, 2012) was a bishop in The Episcopal Church, serving in the Episcopal Diocese of West Virginia, until his retirement. Later, he assisted in the Diocese of Virginia.

== Early and family life ==
Atkinson was born in Washington, D.C. but raised in Martinsburg, West Virginia, where his family moved when he was three. He graduated the Martinsburg High School, and then from the University of Virginia in 1950, where he was a member of the Phi Kappa Psi fraternity. Interested in the ministry since his days at the Peterkin conference center, Atkinson then attended the Virginia Theological Seminary and graduated in 1953.

== Ministry ==
Bishop Robert E.L. Strider ordained Atkinson as a deacon on June 6, 1953, and as a priest on February 24, 1954, as he served at St. Matthew's Episcopal Church in Wheeling, West Virginia (1953-1955). Rev. Atkinson served as rector of Christ Church in Fairmont, West Virginia from 1955 to 1958, when he was called to Trinity Episcopal Church in Huntington, West Virginia (1958-1964). He then moved to Tennessee to become rector of Calvary Episcopal Church in Memphis (1964-1973).

In 1973, the diocesan convention elected him coadjutor to bishop Wilburn C. Campbell, who announced his impending retirement at the end of 1975. Presiding Bishop John E. Hines, bishop Campbell and bishop William Evan Sanders of Tennessee consecrated Atkinson as the 687th bishop in the Episcopal Church. His episcopate began with a controversy, as he had two children in the public schools and was placed on a Kanawha County school textbook committee amidst a violent textbook-banning controversy. That led to 16 sticks of dynamite being blasted on Halloween, 1974 at the Board of Education building a block from the Diocesan center, as well as to his vilification by some partisans both on the street and in print.

Nonetheless, Atkinson (whom many called Bishop Bob) persisted, and after succeeding Rt.Rev. Campbell as West Virginia's fifth bishop in January 1976, also became a leading advocate within the Episcopal Church for the ordination of women. When the General Convention authorized such later in the year, he was among the first to ordain a woman, Rev. Margaret Phillimore. In 1980 Rt.Rev. Atkinson also joined other Anglican bishops protesting the South African government's revocation of bishop Desmond Tutu's passport.

After his retirement from West Virginia in 1989 (and bishop John H. Smith becoming his successor), bishop Atkinson and his wife moved back to Charlottesville, Virginia where one of their daughters lived with he husband and family. Bishop Atkinson then assisted bishop Peter James Lee in the Episcopal Diocese of Virginia, especially in the Shenandoah Valley and adjacent counties of the Blue Ridge Mountains for five years. He and Rosemary then moved to Jacksonville, Florida, where their son's family lived.

== Death and legacy ==
Bishop Atkinson died July 4, 2012, in Jacksonville. He was survived by his wife of 59 years, Rosemary, two daughters and a son and many grandchildren. He is buried at Emmanuel Church in Greenwood, Virginia, whose churchyard looks toward Rockfish Gap, Shenandoah National Park and ultimately West Virginia. He inspired Joe Massey to write books about the Virginia's colonial and historic churches.

Episcopal Church (USA) titles
Preceded by Wilburn C. Campbell	5th Bishop of West Virginia; 1976 – 1989	Succeeded by John H. Smith
