= Williams, Virginia =

Unincorporated community in Virginia, US

- unincorporated community
- Interactive map of Williams, Virginia
- Coordinates: 37°24′04″N 76°19′40″W
- Country: United States
- State: Virginia
- County: Mathews

Williams is an unincorporated community in Mathews County, in the U.S. state of Virginia.

Poplar Grove Mill and House was listed on the National Register of Historic Places in 1969.
