= William Holland Wilmer =

American Episcopal priest and educator (1782-1827)

The Reverend William Holland Wilmer
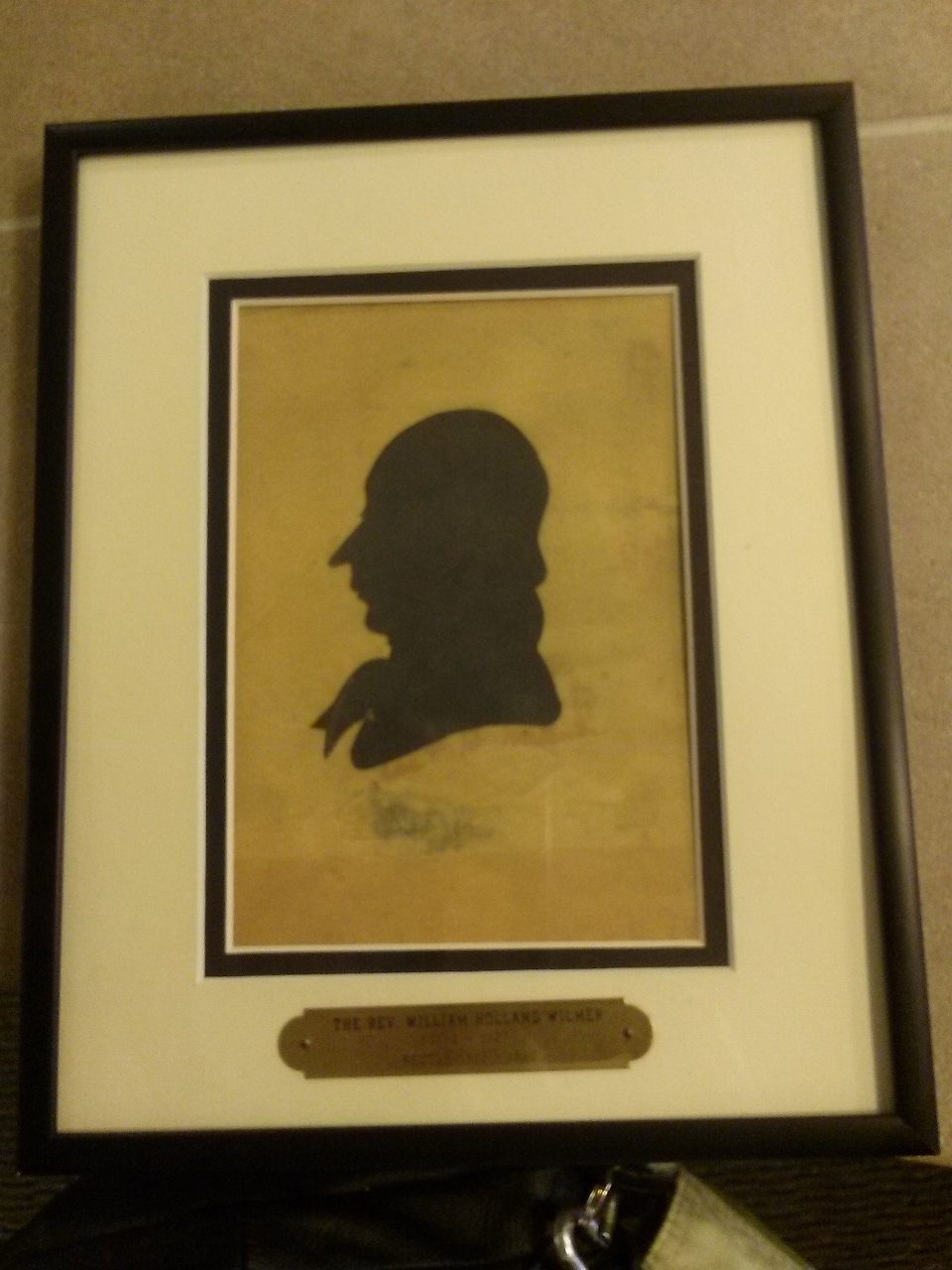
- Rev. William Holland Wilmer, rector at St. Paul's Church, Alexandria

11th President of the College of William & Mary
- In office October 1826 – July 24, 1827
- Preceded by: John Augustine Smith
- Succeeded by: Adam Empie

Personal details
- Born: October 9, 1782 Stepney Manor, Chestertown, Maryland, U.S.
- Died: July 24, 1827 (aged 44) Williamsburg, Virginia, U.S.
- Spouse(s): Harriet Ringgold (d. 1812); Marion Hannah Cox (d. 1821); Ann Brice Fitzhugh (surviving)
- Children: William Porteus Wilmer, Richard Hooker Wilmer, George Thornton Wilmer, Marion Rebecca Brown, Jane Eliza Buel
- Education: Washington College
- Profession: Educator, priest

William Holland Wilmer (October 9, 1782 – July 24, 1827) was an Episcopal priest, teacher and writer in Maryland and Virginia who served briefly as the eleventh president of the College of William and Mary.

== Early life and education ==
The fifth son of Simon, an Anglican priest, and Ann (Ringgold) Wilmer, Wilmer was born on October 29, 1782, at the family's ancestral "Stepney Manor" in Chestertown, Maryland. He graduated from Washington College in 1802. Rev. William Smith founded the college but left twice, eventually becoming the first provost of the University of Pennsylvania in Philadelphia. Wilmer's schoolmates likely included future Maryland governor Thomas Ward Veazey, future Maryland Episcopal bishop William Murray Stone, and future Methodist bishop John Henry. After graduation, Wilmer went into business with his sister's husband, Isaac Cannell, Jr. for six years.

== Career ==
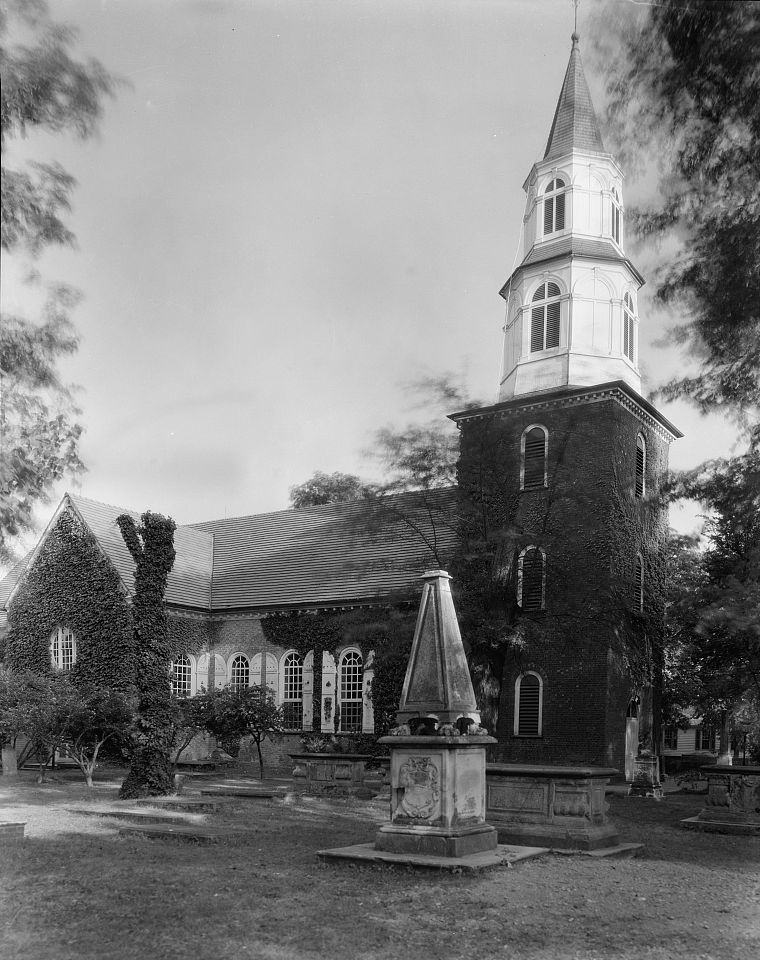
Bruton Parish Church and churchyard in Williamsburg, Virginia, by Frances Benjamin Johnston

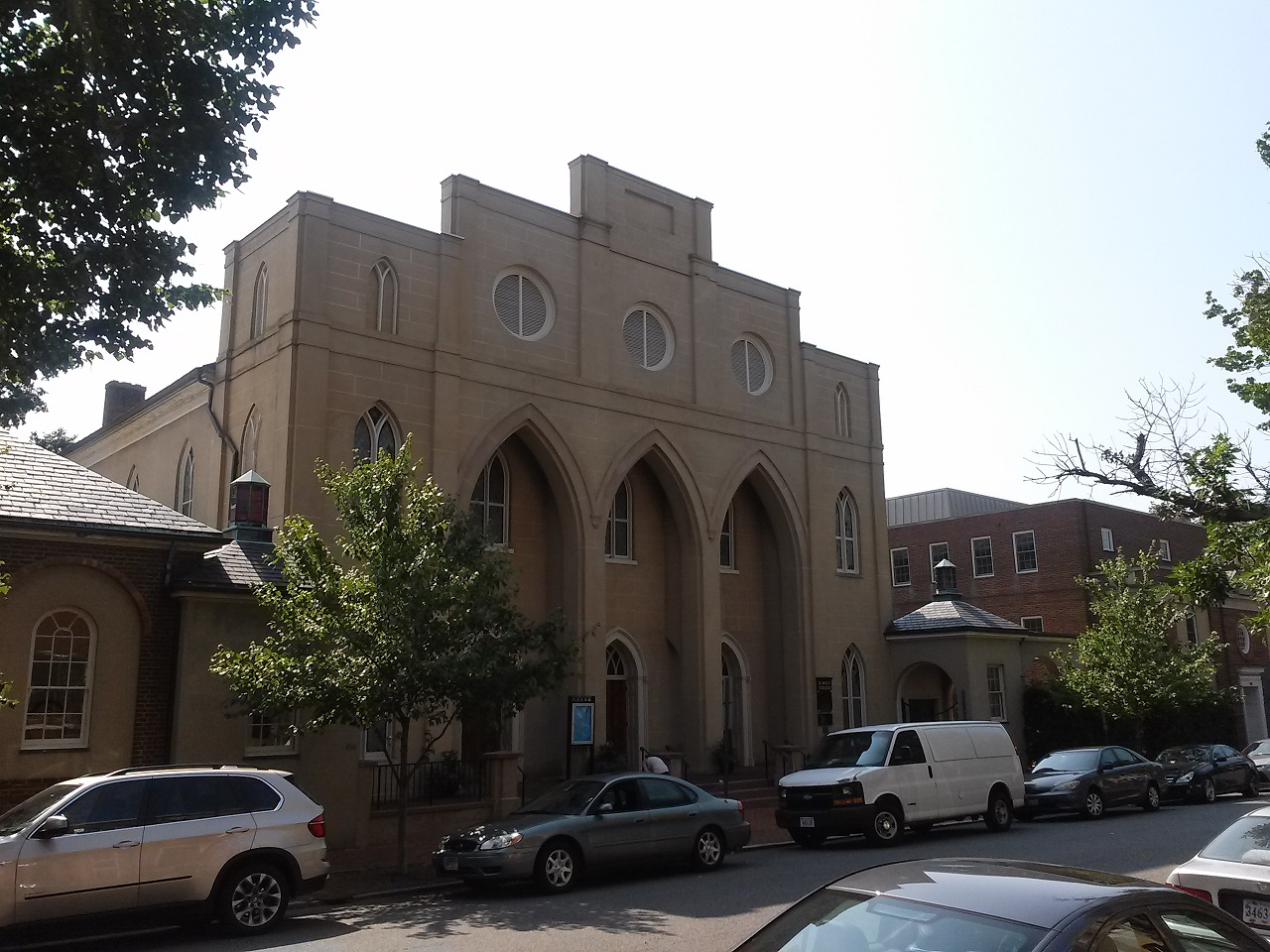
St. Paul's Church in Alexandria Virginia

Although he had attended Methodist prayer meetings as a youth, Wilmer decided that his life's work was to preach the gospel through the established Episcopal Church. He accordingly studied privately, and in 1808 was ordained a deacon by Bishop Thomas Claggett. Wilmer's first assignment was his home parish in Chestertown, and during his four years there, he established what had been the Chapel of Ease in the town's center as the parish's main church, as the previous parish building five miles out of town went to ruin.

In 1812, shortly after the death of his first wife as he himself reached the age of 30 and after his ordination as a priest, Wilmer accepted the joint invitation of Bishop Claggett and William Meade, a newly ordained deacon and who later became the third Episcopal Bishop of Virginia, moved to Alexandria, Virginia, and took charge of the recently organized St. Paul's Church. For a year, Wilmer also served as the first rector of St. John's Church, on Lafayette Square across from what was then called the President's House in the newly created and laid out national capital of District of Columbia, but resigned that position to concentrate on his ministry in Alexandria.

After the First Great Awakening, the disestablishment of the Episcopal Church in Virginia after the Revolutionary War, and the death of Bishop James Madison as the War of 1812 with Britain began in 1812, the Episcopal Church was at such a low ebb in Virginia that its priests had not convened since 1805 and Madison's preferred successor, John Bracken, rector of Bruton Parish Church in Williamsburg, declined the offer. Meade had crossed the Potomac River to study for ordination under Rev. Walter Addison (who succeeded this priest's uncle Rev. James Jones Wilmer and Rev. Obadiah Bruen Brown as Senate Chaplain), but weak eyes had forced him to pause his studies for a time. By that date only about half of Virginia's Episcopal parishes had priests (most serving several churches), and the diocese of Maryland was little better off.

Wilmer and the Second Great Awakening revitalized the Episcopal Church in the Chesapeake Bay and Potomac River region. Wilmer helped Virginia's second bishop Richard Channing Moore, who he, Meade, Edmund Lee, and Bushrod Washington convinced to accept the position headquartered at Monumental Church in Richmond) reinvigorate it more broadly. The Evangelical Anglicanism movement of William Wilberforce as well as the moderation of Calvinist doctrine advanced by Charles Simeon influenced all these clergymen. In 1814, Virginia's Episcopal priests and laity convened and formally elected Bishop Moore. During the diocesan convention, Wilmer delivered the first sermon at the newly rebuilt Monumental Church, followed the next Sunday by then Rev. Meade. In June 1817, Wilmer's Alexandria congregation having outgrown its building, the cornerstone was laid for a new building, designed by Benjamin H. Latrobe of Baltimore and with an interior patterned after a Christopher Wren building (St. James Church, Piccadilly, London) and which would seat 600. Through that summer and winter, Wilmer and Richard Baxter (a leading Jesuit of Georgetown University published a total of 53 learned letters under pseudonyms in the 'Alexandria Gazette' debating Evangelical Lutheran doctrine, which were collected and published together in 1818.

Despite his own congregation's growth, Wilmer remained concerned about the continued shortage of educated Episcopalian priests. In June 1818, a year after the national general convention approved the creation of the General Theological Seminary in New York City, Wilmer became the first President of the Society for the Education of Pious Young Men for the Ministry of the Protestant Episcopal Church in Maryland and Virginia, a position he held until leaving Alexandria for Williamsburg, Virginia, in 1826. The previous year, Wilmer had been one of three men delegated to raise funds for the General Theological Seminary in New York, with particular responsibility for fundraising in the southern dioceses, and he served on the GTS board of trustees from 1820 until his death. Another Education Society founder was Reuel Keith (1792-1842), rector of the newly founded Christ Church (in the District of Columbia but part of the Diocese of Maryland), who had studied at Middlebury College and the recently founded Andover Theological Seminary (mostly Congregational) in Massachusetts before being ordained by Bishop Moore in 1817.

In 1819, Wilmer began publishing and editing the 'Washington Theological Repertory'. and the following year received a doctor of divinity degree from Brown University. The journal was designed to "disseminate the principles of religion and piety," and Wilmer also became involved in several tract and prayer book societies. In 1822 Wilmer published in Baltimore (with the imprimatur of the clerk of the Diocese of Maryland), The Episcopal Manual: A Summary Explanation of the Doctrine, Discipline, and Worship of the Protestant Episcopal Church of the United States of America. The manual may have first been published as early as 1815, and was republished at least four times, including in 1829, shortly after the author's early death.

Meanwhile, in 1821, the Virginia convention of the Episcopal church pledged its support for a regional seminary. Acquiescing to lobbying by the College of William and Mary since at least 1815, the Virginia convention recommended the seminary be located in Williamsburg, to involve the Diocese of North Carolina, as well as those men from the District of Columbia and Diocese of Maryland who had been working together through the Education Society. However, the convention of the Diocese of Maryland failed to concur. Meanwhile, Keith had moved from Georgetown to Williamsburg in 1820 to teach history and classics at the College of William and Mary, as well as to lead Bruton Parish Church—but his classes seemed unpopular and he never had more than one theological student at a time. In 1823 he left for his native Vermont. Moreover, enrollment had so declined at the College that its president, John Augustine Smith recommended it be moved to Richmond, which led to considerable controversy, Smith's resignation and move to New York.

The committee appointed by the Virginia convention changed its mind about the proposed seminary's location—and accepted Alexandria after Hugh Nelson arranged significant funding and Wilmer offered space and persuaded Rev. Keith to return and become its first professor and dean. Thus, Wilmer and Meade (and Bishop Moore) helped found Virginia Theological Seminary(VTS), where Wilmer taught theology and church history from 1823 to 1826. The first class included thirteen candidates for holy orders, and three years later 23 men were studying at VTS.

In 1826, after lobbying by Moore (but refusing his offered position in Richmond), Wilmer moved to Williamsburg to become professor of moral philosophy and rector of Bruton Parish Church. He served as the historic College's interim president from June 1826 to October 1826, when he was elected its eleventh president. He served until his death the following July of "bilious fever"—a two-week illness after a long journey in driving rain. His successor was Adam Empie.

Wilmer also served five times as President of the House of Deputies at the General Convention (1817–26), somewhat to the dismay of those with High Church predilections.

== Slavery ==
During the first census in 1790, Simon Wilmer, representing either Wilmer's father or grandfather, owned 19 slaves and had five free male whites under age 16 in his Kent County, Maryland household. Although Wilmer's salaries were considered large for the time, according to his son's biographer, he spent considerable amounts buying and freeing slaves, so when he died unexpectedly at age 44, the family was forced to rely upon the parish's generosity, and his widow moved back to Alexandria and taught school for several years to support the young family.

As in the case of Robert Carter III, Virginians of this era often chose not to memorialize opposition to slavery. The Maryland Diocesan Archives, deposited with the Maryland Historical Society, only hold about 50 of Wilmer's letters and papers, although the first archivist, Ethan Allen said his brief mission tour of Virginia's Northern Neck with Wilmer confirmed him in his faith and career. Five of Wilmer's sermons were published before 1820; no copies remain of the 1818 or 1820 sermon entitled "The Almost Christian".

== Personal life and family ==
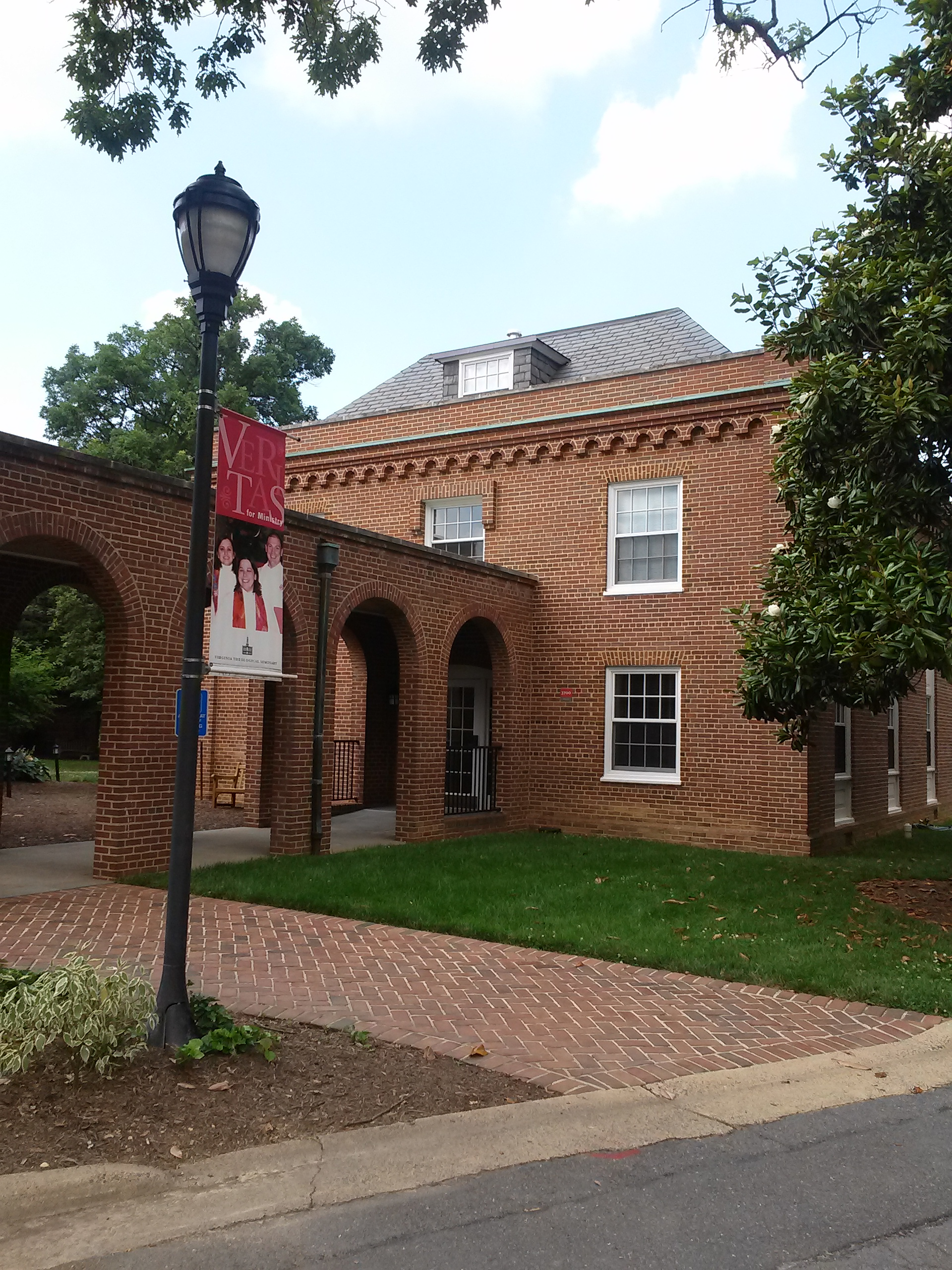
Wilmer Hall at Virginia Theological Seminary

Wilmer's first wife, Harriet Ringgold from Kent County, died soon after their marriage. Soon after moving to Alexandria, Virginia, Wilmer married Marion Hannah Cox of Mount Holly, New Jersey, who died shortly after the birth of their sixth child in 1821. Wilmer caused a scandal when he married Ann Brice Fitzhugh (1801-1854), two decades his junior, on February 5, 1823, but they had two children before his death and she raised her stepchildren. Fitzhugh supported family by opening the Howard School, a boys school in 1831. The school near the campus of VTS, closed in 1834.

Wilmer's eldest son, William Porteus, died of yellow fever at age 21 shortly after his father's death, and both his brothers ultimately became priests. Two of his sisters also married clergymen; Marion Rebecca married Rev. R. Templeton Brown, who ended his clerical career in Rockville, Maryland; and Jane Eliza Wilmer married Rev. Samuel Buel of the General Theological Seminary in New York. Richard Hooker Wilmer, aged 11 at his father's death, worked to support the young family before beginning his clerical career. A firm believer in slavery, he was elected Bishop of Alabama and consecrated by bishops of the Protestant Episcopal Church in the Confederate States of America in 1862, and ratified by the general convention after the Civil War. Bishop Wilmer's son, William Holland Wilmer (1863-1936), became an ophthalmologist in Washington, D.C., Johns Hopkins University, and the Military Medical Research Laboratory in Mineola, New York. and benefactor of Washington National Cathedral.

Rev. Wilmer's other surviving son, George Thornton Wilmer (1819-1898), later became rector of Bruton parish and a professor at the College of William and Mary after serving as a lieutenant in the Virginia Home Guard and a professor of theology at the University of the South in Sewanee, Tennessee. He ultimately moved to and died in Pittsylvania County, Virginia. Rev. G.T. Wilmer's son Cary B. Wilmer also became a priest and taught at Sewanee.

Two of Wilmer's brothers also became Episcopal priests. Lemuel Wilmer became rector at Port Tobacco, Maryland, then a major slave trading port. His brother Simon held posts near the ancestral home in Kent County, Maryland, in Swedesboro, New Jersey, and later Radnor, Pennsylvania, but was disciplined by conservative bishop George Washington Doane for not giving up his affiliation with the Diocese of Pennsylvania under Bishop William White while serving as a supply priest for coastal New Jersey parishes without a rector following his departure from Swedesboro after his wife's death. Although evangelical or Methodist-leaning Rev. Simon Wilmer published a pamphlet in his defense, he ultimately married a wealthy widow and accepted a position near Washington, D.C., at Christ Episcopal Church in Accokeek, Maryland. Simon's son Joseph Pere Bell Wilmer, who graduated from Virginia Theological Seminary in 1834, eventually became Bishop of Louisiana, succeeding Bishop and Confederate General Leonidas Polk and later became known for his support of High Church practices.

== Legacy ==
Fifteen years after Wilmer's death, an updated edition of The Episcopal Manual, sometimes nicknamed Wilmer's Episcopal Manual, was published in Philadelphia. The College of William and Mary's Special Collections Research Center maintains his personal papers. Other records are held by the Diocese of Maryland.

A tablet memorializing Wilmer remains posted in Bruton Church in Williamsburg. Virginia Theological Seminary named its former library Wilmer Hall after Wilmer; a residence hall and campus street are also now named after him. His former parish in Alexandria also built a hall named after their late rector in 1860; rebuilt in 1860, it housed a school, now parish offices and a head start and preschool).
