= John H. Smith (bishop) =

The Right Reverend John H. Smith
- VI Bishop of West Virginia
- Church: Episcopal Church
- Diocese: West Virginia
- In office: 1989–1999
- Predecessor: Robert P. Atkinson
- Successor: W. Michie Klusmeyer

Orders
- Ordination: 1965
- Consecration: 1989 by Edmond L. Browning

Personal details
- Born: September 11, 1939 Panama Canal Zone
- Died: June 2, 2012 (aged 72) Brunswick, Maine, United States
- Denomination: Anglican
- Spouse: Victoria Dawley Smith
- Children: 3

John Henry Smith (September 11, 1939 – June 2, 2012) was the sixth bishop of the Episcopal Diocese of West Virginia.

== Early life and education ==
Born and raised in the Panama Canal Zone, Smith graduated from Balboa High School and later Cornell University. In 1964, he graduated from the General Theological Seminary, and he married his wife, the former Victoria Dawley. Rev. Smith also earned a Doctor of Ministry degree from Hartford Seminary in 1980, and received honorary degrees from his GTS alma mater as well as from the Virginia Theological Seminary. The Smiths owned a summer camp in North Waterford, Maine from 1970 until his death.

== Ministry ==
Ordained in 1965, Rev. Smith served parishes in Falmouth, Skowhegan and Palmyra, Maine, and became a champion of joint ministries for small parishes. He then taught and served as chaplain at the National Cathedral School in Washington, D.C.

When elected bishop of the Episcopal Diocese of West Virginia in 1989, Rev. Smith had been serving for a decade in Vermont, in Middlebury and at Trinity Episcopal Church in Rutland. Presiding bishop Edmund L. Browning led the consecration service for the 841st bishop of the Episcopal Church, assisted by bishop William G. Weinhauer of Western North Carolina and James R. Moodey of Ohio.

In 1996, Smith wrote Cluster Ministry: A faithful response, a fourth edition of which the Diocese of West Virginia published in 2000. Rt.Rev. Smith retired from the diocese of West Virginia upon reaching age 60 in 1999. At the time of his retirement, the diocese had 78 parishes organized in 11 clusters.

He moved with his wife to Brunswick, Maine in 2003. From 2006 to 2010, Smith served as priest-in-charge at St. Peter's Episcopal Church in Bridgton, Maine, which he helped build.

Episcopal Church (USA) titles
Preceded by Robert P. Atkinson	6th Bishop of West Virginia; 1989 – 1999	Succeeded by W. Michie Klusmeyer
