= Christ Church (Georgetown, Washington, D.C.) =

Historic church in Washington, D.C., United States

- Christ Church, Georgetown
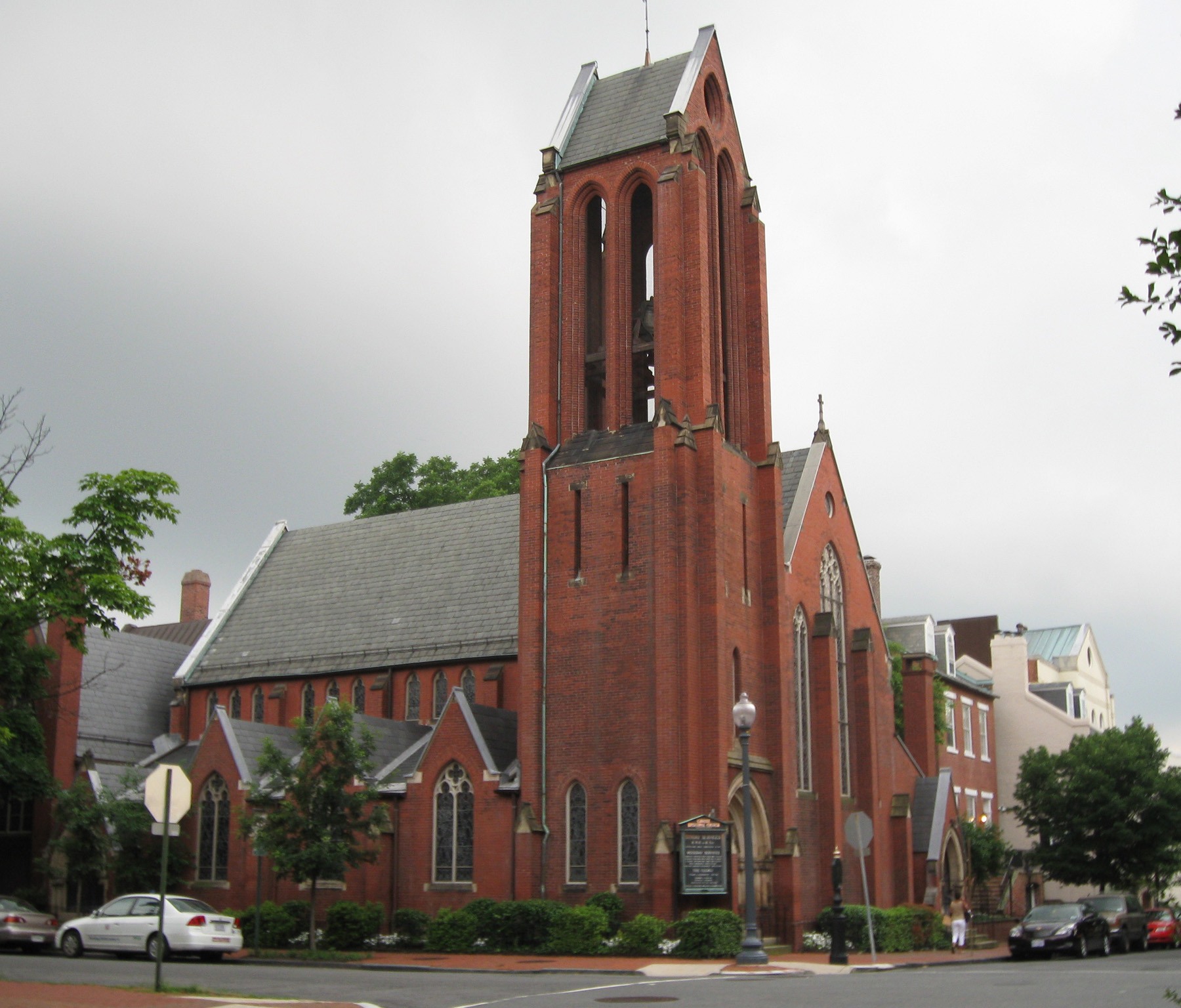
- Christ Church
- 38°54′47″N 77°03′43″W
- Location: 3116 O Street NW, Washington, D.C.
- Country: United States
- Denomination: Episcopal Church

Architecture
- Functional status: Active
- Architect(s): Cassell & Laws; William C. Morrison
- Style: Late Gothic Revival
- Completed: 1887

Administration
- Province: Province of Washington
- Diocese: Diocese of Washington
- Deanery: Central District of Columbia

Clergy
- Rector: Timothy A. R. Cole
- Christ Church
- U.S. National Register of Historic Places
- U.S. National Historic Landmark District – Contributing property
- D.C. Inventory of Historic Sites
- Part of: Georgetown Historic District
- NRHP reference No.: 72001421

Significant dates
- Added to NRHP: March 16, 1972
- Designated DCIHS: November 8, 1964

Christ Church (commonly known as Christ Church Georgetown) founded in 1817, is a historic Episcopal church located at 31st and O Streets, Northwest, Washington, D.C., in the Georgetown neighborhood. Its first rector was Reuel Keith (1792–1842), who with William Holland Wilmer, rector of St. Paul's Episcopal Church (Alexandria, Virginia), in 1818 founded an Education Society to train Episcopal priests. Rev. Keith left this parish in 1820 to accept a position at Bruton Parish Church and teach at the College of William and Mary in Williamsburg, Virginia, although he later returned to the new national capital and taught at the Virginia Theological Seminary when it was founded in 1823.

The current church building, built in 1885–1886, replaced an earlier church building built in 1818. The church building was erected at a cost of $50,000 (equivalent to $1,790,000 in 2025), and it opened on October 28, 1886. It was added to the National Register of Historic Places in 1972. The building was deemed "a very fine example of late 19th century Gothic". It has been termed a "miniature cathedral" for its "tall dominating bell tower, its stone Gothic arches and lancet windows. It is a one-story 90 by 60 feet (27 m × 18 m) structure built of red, smooth-faced brick laid in common bond, with yellow sandstone used for "window sills, buttress caps, corner blocks at gable and dormer ends, door enframements, the north gable finial and cross, gable copings for the main church and aisle dormers (though most of this stonework is covered with a protective sheet of lead), as well as the steps to the doorways."

The building is also a contributing property in the Georgetown Historic District, also listed on the National Register.

During the COVID-19 pandemic in the United States, on March 8, the rector of the church informed parishioners that he was the first Washington, D.C., resident to test positive for the coronavirus. All services were canceled that Sunday. According to the assistant to the rector, this was the first time the church had closed since a fire in the 1800s.

The church reported 1,189 members in 2020 and 1,589 members in 2023; no membership statistics were reported in 2024 parochial reports. Plate and pledge income reported for the congregation in 2024 was $1,661,319. Average Sunday attendance (ASA) in 2024 was 352 persons.

== See also ==
- National Register of Historic Places listings in Washington, D.C.
