= Matthew Davis Cowden =

American Episcopal Bishop

The Right Reverend Matthew Davis Cowden
- Bishop of West Virginia
- Church: Episcopal Church
- Diocese: West Virginia
- Elected: September 25, 2021
- Predecessor: W. Michie Klusmeyer
- Previous posts: Rector, St. Michael and All Angels Episcopal Church, South Bend, Indiana (2009-2022)

Orders
- Consecration: March 12, 2022 by Michael Curry

Personal details
- Denomination: Anglican
- Spouse: Melissa Cowden
- Children: 3
- Education: Florida State University

Matthew Davis Cowden is the VIII bishop of the Episcopal Diocese of West Virginia. He was elected from a slate of three candidates by the 144th diocesan convention on September 25, 2021, and consecrated in Wesley Chapel on the campus of West Virginia Wesleyan University on March 12, 2022. Upon Bishop W. Michie Klusmeyer's retirement on October 13, 2022, he became the Eighth Bishop of West Virginia.

From 2009 until his election he was rector of St. Michael and All Angels Episcopal Church in South Bend, Indiana. He received the Master of Divinity from Virginia Theological Seminary in 2006. He previously received a bachelor's degree from Florida State University and a master's degree from the University of California Los Angeles and worked as a college theatre professor. He and his wife Melissa have three children.

== See also ==
- List of Episcopal bishops of the United States
- Historical list of the Episcopal bishops of the United States
