= John Augustine Smith =

American president of the College of William and Mary (1782–1865)

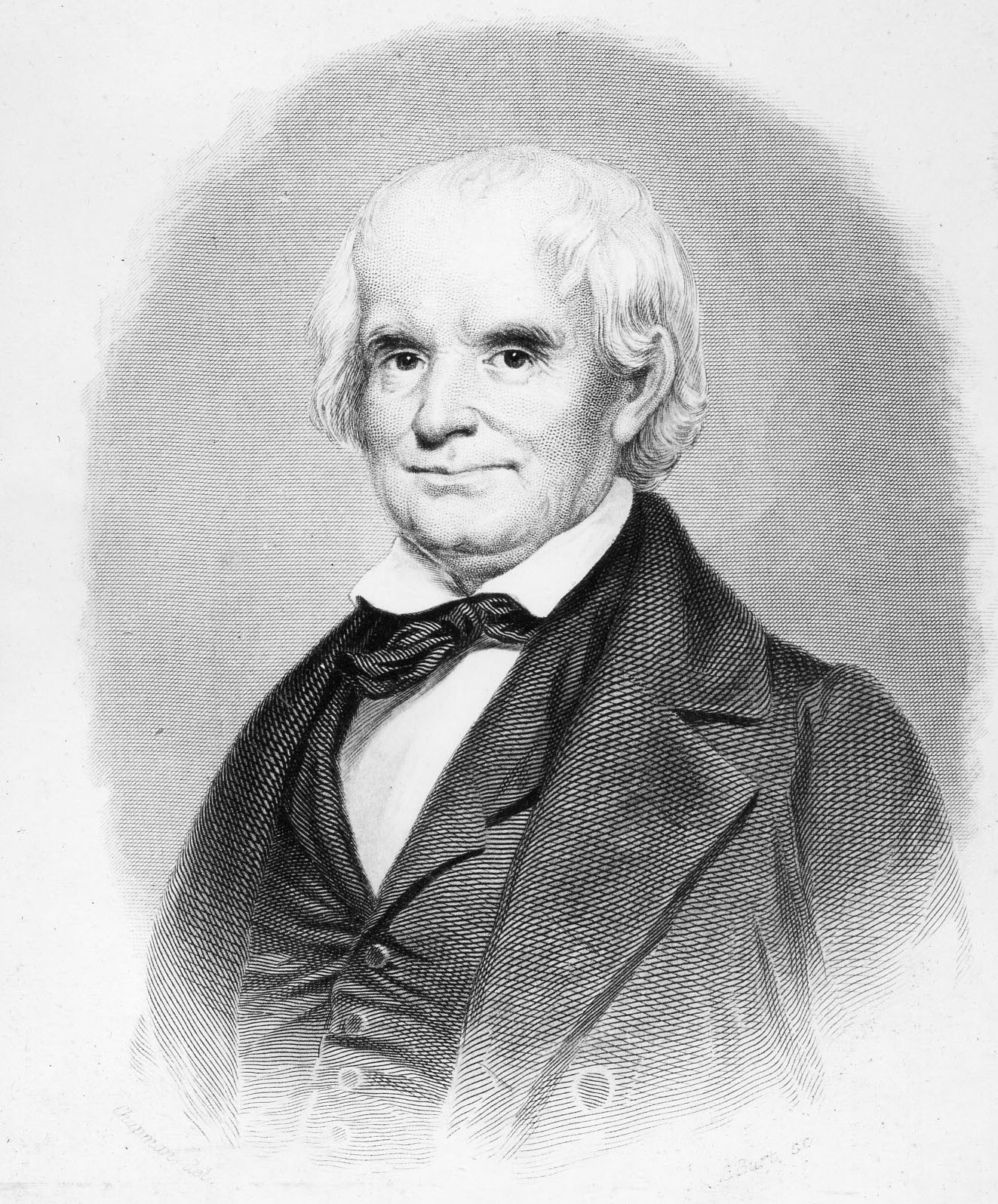

10th President of the College of William & Mary
- In office 1814–1826
- Preceded by: John Bracken
- Succeeded by: William Holland Wilmer

Personal details
- Born: August 29, 1782 Westmoreland County, Virginia
- Died: February 9, 1865 (aged 82)
- Education: College of William & Mary

John Augustine Smith (29 August 1782 – 9 February 1865) was an American medical doctor and the tenth president of the College of William & Mary, serving from 1814 to 1826.

== Early and family life ==
Smith was born into a prominent Westmoreland County family as the son of Reverend Thomas Smith. He graduated from the College of William & Mary in 1800, then traveled to New York City, where he studied medicine.

== Career ==
Dr. Smith began practicing as a physician in New York City. In 1809 he became lecturer on anatomy at the College of Physicians and Surgeons, and editor of the Medical and Physiological Journal.

In 1814 he was elected president of the College of William & Mary. Smith succeeded Rev. James Madison and was the first layman to hold the presidency.

In 1824, facing low enrollment at the College, Smith proposed that it be moved to Richmond from Williamsburg; however, the General Assembly refused to authorize the move and the controversy eventually caused Smith to resign.

After leaving William & Mary, Smith returned to New York City and joined the faculty of the College of Physicians and Surgeons, eventually becoming its president in 1831. While at King's College, Smith became a prominent advocate of scientific racism, justifying white supremacy using phrenology and advocating for black people to be removed from the United States.

Smith's publications include "Introductory Discourse" (New York, 1837), "Select Discourse on the Functions of the Nervous System" (1840), "The Mutations of the Earth" (1846) and "Moral and Physical Science" (1853).
