= Clementina Tompkins =

American painter

- Born: c. 1848; Washington, D.C., U.S.
- Died: November 9, 1931
- Resting place: Oak Hill Cemetery
- Occupation: American painter

Clementina M. G. Tompkins (c. 1848 – November 9, 1931) was an American painter.

Tompkins was born in Washington, D.C., to a family with roots in Virginia; through her father she was the niece of Sally Louisa Tompkins, in whose will she was remembered. Much of her professional career was spent in France, where she attended the École nationale supérieure des Beaux-Arts and studied with Léon Bonnat. She showed work at the salons of Paris and Brussels, and at the Centennial Exposition in Philadelphia. She also sent work back to the United States for exhibition on other occasions. Tompkins favored Italian subjects for her paintings; she also produced portraits and figure pieces during her career. She spent time working in New York City later in her career. One source claims she died in that city; another states that she died in the city of her birth, where she is buried in the Oak Hill Cemetery. It has been claimed that her work is held by both the Museum of Fine Arts, Boston and the Pennsylvania Academy of the Fine Arts.
