= Adam Empie =

American Episcopal priest and academic

The Reverend Adam Empie
- Rev. Adam Empie

12th President of the College of William & Mary
- In office 1827–1836
- Preceded by: William Holland Wilmer
- Succeeded by: Thomas Roderick Dew

Personal details
- Born: September 7, 1785 Schenectady, New York, United States
- Died: November 6, 1860 (aged 75) Wilmington, North Carolina
- Resting place: Oakdale Cemetery
- Spouse: Ann Eliza Wright
- Children: Adam Empie Jr., John Joshua Empie, Anna Catharina Shepard, Charles Wright Empie, Lucy Wooster Brown, Zusan Wright Smead and Ann Smith Hill.
- Education: Union College (1807)
- Profession: Educator, priest

Adam Empie (September 7, 1785 – November 6, 1860) was an Episcopal priest in North Carolina and Virginia, who also taught and served as President of the College of William and Mary.

== Early life and education ==
Born in Schenectady, New York, to a family of Dutch descent with four full siblings and three half siblings, Empie learned about Dutch Reform and Presbyterian churches and their beliefs. However, he warmed to the Protestant Episcopal Church while still a very young man. Empie worked during his years as a student at Union College in Schenectady, as well as studied under Eliphalet Nott and Benjamin Allen. Despite his busy work schedule and some health issues, he graduated with honors in 1807.

Empie lived in Rhinebeck and Hempstead, New York, for the next two years where he studied for the ministry and taught in the Classical Academy of the Rev. Seth Hart, as well as tutored the children of Thomas Tillotson, Secretary of State of New York. The Rev. John Henry Hobart, soon to be Bishop of New York, became Empie's mentor during this time.

== Ministry ==
Empie was ordained deacon in 1809, then admitted into the priesthood. The Rt. Rev. Benjamin Moore, father of Clement Clarke Moore, a seminary professor and the author of "Twas the Night Before Christmas", led Empie's ordination service. His first assignment was St. George's Church in Hempstead, where he assisted the rector, Seth Hart.

By this time, Empie was known for his superior thought processes, but he continued to be plagued health problems doctors diagnosed as "rheumatism." Word of Empie's intellectual and inspirational sermons traveled fast. In 1810, St. James' Church, established 1729 in Wilmington, North Carolina, called him as their rector. To sweeten the deal, they vestry offered him a summer residence on breezy Wrightsville Sound, and suggested he could augment his $1200 a year salary by teaching at a local private school.

Empie moved to Wilmington in 1811. The small congregation delighted in his mental calisthenics and supported him in his many projects. The young rector helped revitalize what he helped organize as the Episcopal Diocese of North Carolina: conducting a census of North Carolina Episcopalians, as well as fighting to abolish the practice of creating vestries by public election.

In 1814, the newly married Empies (see below) moved to West Point, NY, where the groom started a new job as professor of ethics, treasurer, and as the first chaplain of the U. S. Military Academy. Superintendent Joseph Gardner Swift, who had become acquainted with Empie during his work on North Carolina's coastal defenses in the War of 1812, arranged for Empie's employment at West Point.

In 1816, the Empies returned to Wilmington, and to St. James Church. A year later, with the help of the Rev. Bethel Judd, Adam Empie succeeded in organizing the Diocese of North Carolina. Its first bishop, John Stark Ravenscroft, called Empie, "That emphatic preacher." Over the next ten years, St. James Church experienced enormous growth. Empie created associations to educate the poor and to provide them with Bibles and books of their own. Also, he organized an effort to create a parochial library. Empie's strong approach, doubtless, influenced many, but especially moved two of his wife's relatives. Ann Eliza's cousin, a businessman named Thomas Wright, left his work to become a minister. He served churches in Wadesboro and Salisbury, before moving to Memphis where he founded Calvary Church in 1832. Ann Eliza's brother, Thomas Henry Wright, was a layman at St. James in Wilmington, and at Mt. Lebanon Chapel, a summer chapel he built on Wrightsville Sound. The chapel, now owned by St. James, is the oldest house of worship in New Hanover County.

In 1827, the growing Empie family moved to Williamsburg, Virginia, where the Rev. William Holland Wilmer (like Empie an opponent of slavery) had died unexpectedly. Empie served there as rector of Bruton Parish Church. He also taught classes in belles letters, logic, and ethics and served as 11th president of the College of William and Mary. In 1830, Empie received an honorary doctorate from the University of North Carolina. During his decade in Williamsburg, enrollment increased, and William Barton Rogers became his protégé. The development of a quality technical school had always been one of Empie's pet projects, but the College of William & Mary had for decades been suffering financially. He sent Rogers out on a fundraising campaign in Boston—and the Massachusetts Institute of Technology was the eventual result, rather than revitalization in Virginia.

== Family life and slavery ==
On March 24, 1814, Empie married a 15-year-old Southern girl, Ann Eliza Wright. The daughter of Judge Joshua Grainger Wright, she grew up in a gracious home across the street from the church and, like Empie, spent summers on Wrightsville Sound. The Empies ultimately became parents to 12 children before Ann Eliza Empie died in 1843, but only eight lived to adulthood, and only John Joshua Empie, Anna Catharina Shepard, Adam Empie Jr., Susan Wright Smead, Charles Wright Empie, Lucy Wooster Brown and Ann Smith Hill survived their parents.

Despite Empie's outspoken opposition to slavery, he received several slaves when he married Ann Eliza. Empie freed his slaves, but he treated them so kindly they refused to leave him. The most beloved of their slaves were buried in the Empie plot at Oakdale Cemetery, a white cemetery in Wilmington.

Later, Empie's opposition to slavery, and service to his African-American parishioners, caused friction at Bruton Parish and the College of William & Mary. When Empie baptised, married and buried "Africans" and invited them to worship services, other parishioners resisted. Empie appealed to Bishop William Meade (a fellow member of the American Colonization Society) as well as the Virginia State Legislature. His actions were upheld, but life became so unpleasant for him in Williamsburg that he resigned and moved his family to Raleigh. The William & Mary trustees selected 1820 graduate and prolific slavery apologist Thomas Roderick Dew to succeed Empie as the college's 12th president. Empie taught at Raleigh's Episcopal High School from 1836 until 1838, as Virginia once again debated slavery's role at its Constitutional Convention.

== Later career ==
Empie served in Richmond during the final sixteen years of his ministry (1837 to 1853). In 1843, his wife died in Richmond and he returned her for burial in her family's plot at Wilmington's Oakdale cemetery. Nonetheless, he managed to scrimp enough funds to send his namesake son to the University of Virginia after a term at the United States Military Academy at West Point; Adam Empie Jr. graduated in 1845 and became a lawyer in Virginia. While in Richmond, Rev. Empie organized St. James's Church, named after his beloved post in Wilmington, and not far from the slave jail at Shockoe Bottom. Empie also established a private school for young men in Richmond, encouraged the creation of slave galleries in the city's existing white churches, and founded a slave mission on Broad Street that taught Bible lessons. Empie's favorite Bible verse still graces the entrance and altar of St. James's in Richmond: "Be ye doers of the word and not hearers only."

During his ministry in Richmond, Empie kept close business and personal ties with Wilmington. His business ventures consisted mostly of property and business ownership that came to him from his wife's family. He also received royalties from a book of his sermons that sold well in the Northern states.

== Death and legacy ==
In 1853 as a widower, Empie returned to live in Wilmington, where his son Adam had married and moved his legal practice, to "seek repose in the society of his children." His last years were spent in excruciating pain from rheumatism. He spent most of his time praying and meditating. At the very end, he lost his ability to speak, but could still write in a feeble hand. His last words, written shortly before his death on November 6, 1860, were "To die is gain." He is buried with his wife in Oakdale cemetery.

North Carolina erected a historical marker in his memory. His papers are at the Manuscripts and Rare Books Department, Swem Library, College of William and Mary, as well as the U. S. Military Academy, and the Lower Cape Fear Historical Society. The New Hanover County Public Library has a portrait, over which it asserts copyright. Other papers relating to his life and ministry are at Bruton Parish, St. James's Church (Richmond), Schaffer Library, Union College; Special Collections, U.N.C.-W; Perkins Library, Duke University; Southern and N.C. Collections, U.N.C.; Trinity College Library; New Hanover County Public Library; N. C. State Archives; Special Collections; The Valentine Museum, Richmond History Center; The South Caroliniana Library, U. S. C.; and Columbia University.

== Sources ==
- Susan Taylor Block. Temple of our Fathers: St. James Church (1729-2004). Wilmington, NC, 2004.
- Susan Taylor Block "Adam Empie: "That Emphatic Preacher." (The Vineyard of St. James Parish, Wilmington, NC. Spring 2003)
- Catherine W. Bishir: North Carolina Architecture;
- E. C. Hicks: Hicks, Ward, Wright, Yonge and 7812 Descendants;
- James Sprunt: Chronicles of the Lower Cape Fear;
- Joseph Gardner Swift: The Memoirs of Joseph Gardner Swift;
- Leora Hiatt McEachern, assisted by Bill Reaves: History of St. James Church, 1729–1979, Wilmington, 1985;
- Lawrence Foushee London and Sarah McCulloh Lemmon,The Episcopal Church in North Carolina, 1701-1959 (Raleigh, 1987)
- Ellen Davies-Rodgers: The Great Book: Calvary Protestant Episcopal Church, Memphis.
