= Poplar Grove Mill and House =

Historic house in Virginia, United States

- U.S. National Register of Historic Places
- Virginia Landmarks Register
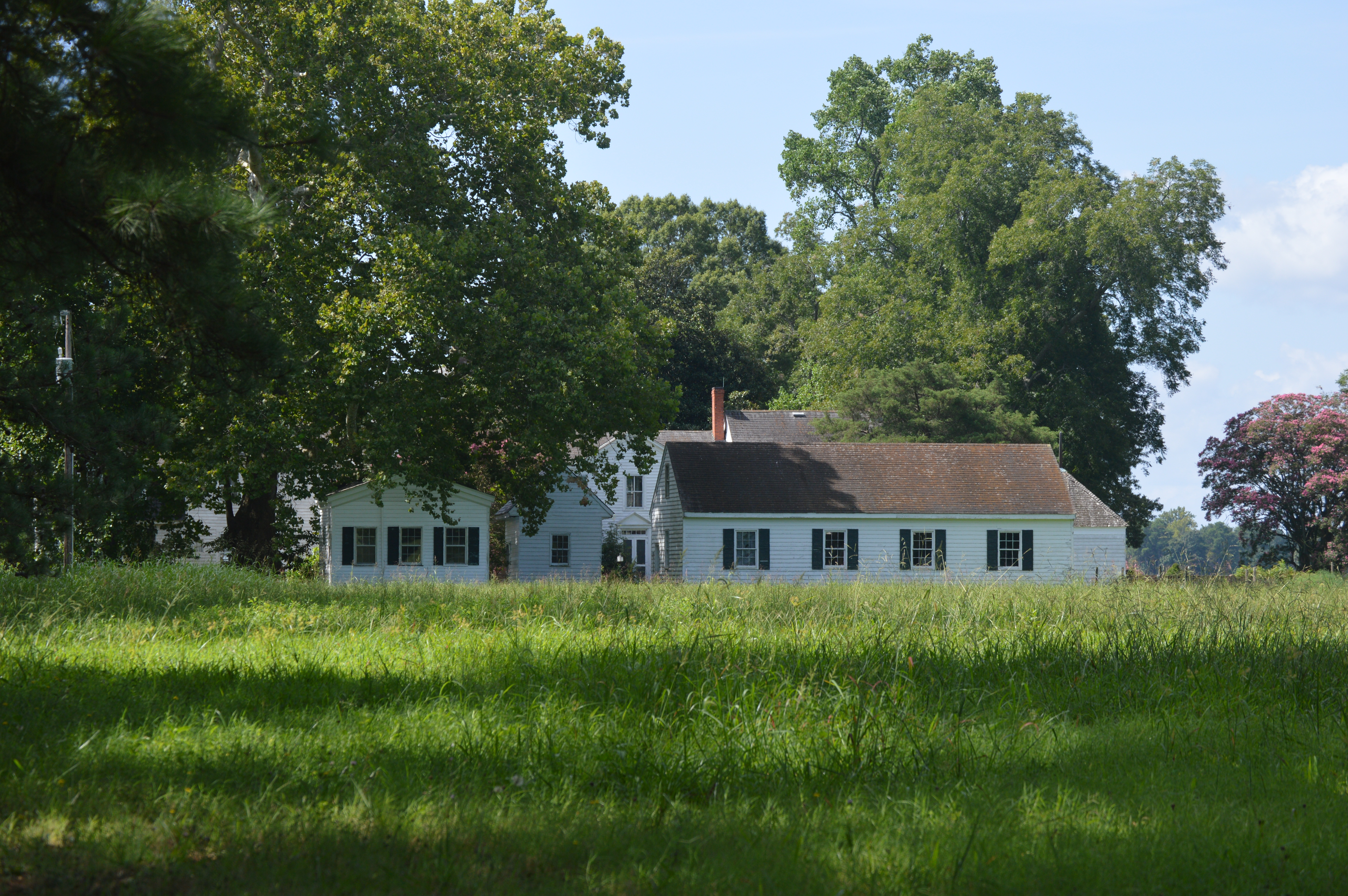
- House, seen from the north

- Location within Virginia Location within the United States
- Location: Southwest of junction of Rtes. 14 and 613, near Williams, Virginia
- Coordinates: 37°23′55″N 76°19′55″W
- Area: 22.5 acres (9.1 ha)
- Built: c. 1770
- NRHP reference No.: 69000259
- VLR No.: 057-0008

Significant dates
- Added to NRHP: November 12, 1969
- Designated VLR: May 13, 1969

Poplar Grove Mill and House is a historic tide mill and home located near Williams, Mathews County, Virginia. The tide mill is a two-story frame structure built after the American Civil War with a gable roof built on a narrow mole which separates a small lagoon or mill pond from the bay. It replaced an earlier mill destroyed during the war at which, it is believed, that corn was ground for General George Washington's troops when they camped nearby. The earliest portion of the miller's house is dated to about 1770, and is a small 2 1/2-story gambrel roof cottage which has been incorporated into the present five section house as an end wing. The central portion of the house is a late 18th-century temple-form building fronted by a later Ionic order portico. Captain Sally Louisa Tompkins, the famous woman Confederate officer, was born at Poplar Grove in 1833.

It was listed on the National Register of Historic Places in 1969.
