= W. Michie Klusmeyer =

American Episcopal prelate (born 1955)

The Right Reverend William Michie Klusmeyer
- Bishop of West Virginia
- Church: Episcopal Church
- Diocese: West Virginia
- Elected: May 5, 2001
- In office: 2001–2022
- Predecessor: John H. Smith
- Successor: Matthew Cowden

Orders
- Ordination: December 1980 by James W. Montgomery
- Consecration: October 13, 2001 by Frank Griswold

Personal details
- Born: 1955 (age 70–71) Glen Cove, New York, United States
- Denomination: Anglican
- Spouse: Marsha Klusmeyer
- Children: 2
- Education: Illinois College

William Michie Klusmeyer (born 1955) is an American Episcopal prelate who was the Bishop of West Virginia from 2001 until 2022.

== Biography ==
Born in Glen Cove, New York, he moved with his family to the Chicago suburbs. He was educated at Illinois College, in Jacksonville, Illinois, where he majored in Spanish and Elementary Education. He then attended the General Theological Seminary in New York, where he graduated in 1980.

Having grown up in The Episcopal Church, where he served as a choir member, an acolyte, a Sunday School teacher, and Lay Reader, he was ordained to the Sacred Order of Deacons by the Right Rev. Quintin E Primo, Jr, Bishop Suffragan of the Episcopal Diocese of Chicago. Klusmeyer was appointed to be the Curate at Grace Episcopal Church in Freeport, Illinois. He was ordained to the priesthood by the Right Rev. James W. Montgomery, Bishop of Chicago. In early 1982, he was elected Rector of Grace Church, Freeport, where he served until mid-1990. He was then elected Rector of Trinity Episcopal Church, Wheaton, Illinois. While there, Trinity became active in homeless ministries, children's ministries as well as Transitional Housing.

In 2001, he was elected the 7th Bishop of The Episcopal Diocese of West Virginia. He was consecrated Bishop in 2001, by Presiding Bishop Frank Griswold (chief consecrator); retired Bishop of West Virginia, Robert P. Atkinson; and (then) current Bishop of Chicago, William Persell. He served on the Board of Trustees of the Virginia Seminary, on the Board of the General Theological Seminary, and also served on the Board of the Bexley-Seabury Seminary, where he served as chair of the board from 2012 until 2020. During his time on the Board, he helped navigate the Federation of the two seminaries.

He served as Honorary Chair of the Reynolds Memorial Hospital Board. He also served on the Board of the West Virginia Council of Churches, and was President of the Council for many years.

He was Chair of the Presiding Bishop's Council of Advice, and served on numerous Commissions, Committees, Agencies and Boards for The Episcopal Church.

Klusmeyer retired on October 13, 2022.

Following his retirement as Bishop of West Virginia, Klusmeyer assumed the role of canon to the presiding bishop for ministry within The Episcopal Church. He served in that role for one year.

== See also ==
- List of Episcopal bishops of the United States
- Historical list of the Episcopal bishops of the United States
