= William Loyall Gravatt =

American bishop

The Right Reverend William Loyall Gravatt D.D.
- II Bishop of West Virginia
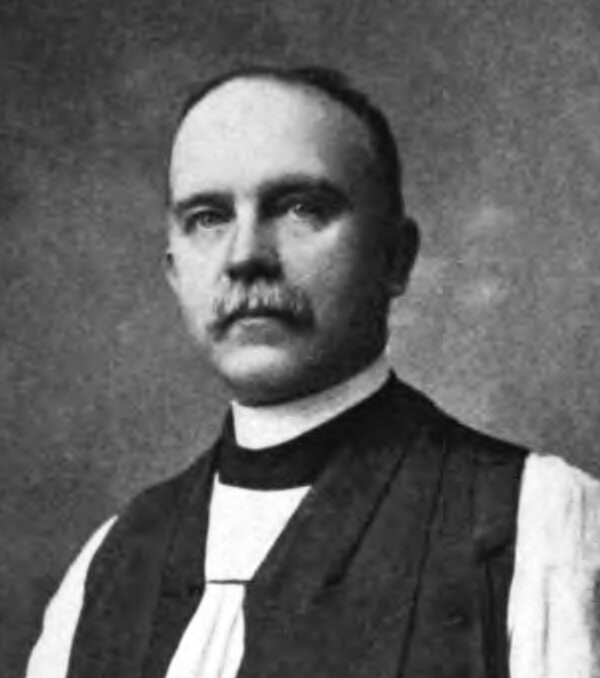
- Province: Episcopal Church
- Diocese: West Virginia
- In office: 1916–1939
- Predecessor: George William Peterkin
- Successor: Robert E. L. Strider Sr.
- Previous post: Coadjutor Bishop of West Virginia (1899-1916)

Orders
- Ordination: May 20, 1885 by Francis McNeece Whittle
- Consecration: November 10, 1899 by Francis McNeece Whittle

Personal details
- Born: December 15, 1859 Port Royal, Virginia, United States
- Died: February 14, 1942 (aged 82) Charleston, West Virginia, United States
- Buried: Zion Episcopal Churchyard, Charles Town, West Virginia
- Denomination: Anglican
- Parents: John James Gravatt and Mary Elizabeth Smith
- Spouse: Sidney S. Peyton
- Children: 4

William Loyall Gravatt (December 15, 1859 – February 14, 1942) became the second Bishop of West Virginia in the Episcopal Church in the United States, after serving as a coadjutor to Bishop George William Peterkin.

== Early and family life ==
Born in Port Royal, Virginia, William was the grandson of merchant Robert Gravatt, whose Huguenot ancestors had arrived in Caroline County, Virginia after France repealed the Edict of Nantes and began persecuting Protestants. His father was Dr. John James Gravatt (1817-1886) and mother Mary Eliza Smith of Richmond (daughter of Col. J.H. Smith of distinguished English ancestry, granddaughter of Larkin Smith). Dr. Gravatt served on the vestry of the local Episcopal church for 31 years, and was ultimately buried in the St. Peter's churchyard. One elder brother became a doctor like their father, a sister married a Confederate general, and John Gravatt also became an Episcopal priest in Virginia. During the American Civil War, Dr. Gravatt, a surgeon, ran a hospital in Richmond. After the war, Dr. Gravatt served as Port Royal's mayor as well as became a delegate to the Reconstruction Convention.

Young William Gravatt studied at Virginia Tech, and then theology at the Virginia Theological Seminary, graduating in 1884. He later received honorary degrees from Washington and Lee University and the University of the South.

He married Sidney S. Peyton of Richmond in 1887 and the couple would ultimately have four children, and die within hours of each other.

== Career ==
After graduation, William Gravatt served as a curate at St. Paul's Church in Richmond, Virginia for three years, during which he was ordained as a deacon by bishop Francis McNeece Whittle in 1885 and as a priest by the same bishop the following year. Rev. Gravatt then became the rector at St. Peter's Church in Norfolk, Virginia, a newly founded parish where he served until 1893.

Rev. Gravatt then accepted the call from prestigious Zion Episcopal Church in Charles Town, West Virginia and became its rector. When West Virginia's Bishop George William Peterkin asked for appointment of a coadjutor in 1899, the diocesan council elected Rev. Gravatt. He was consecrated in November 10, 1899 by Bishops Peterkin, Whittle and Missionary Bishop Charles Clifton Penick.

Rt.Rev. Gravatt ultimately succeeded Rt.Rev. Peterkin in 1916, and retired in 1939, the year he helped consecrate his nephew John J. Gravatt (brother John's son).

== Death and legacy ==
The retired bishop and his wife of 54 years, Sidney Peyton Gravatt, died within 2 hours of each other at their home in Charleston in 1942. Joint services were held at Zion Episcopal Church, Charles Town, where they were both laid to rest in the Zion Episcopal Churchyard.

The Episcopal Diocese of West Virginia continues to honor its second bishop, as a building at the diocesan Peterkin Conference Center in Romney, West Virginia is named in his honor.

== See also ==
- List of Succession of Bishops for the Episcopal Church, USA

Episcopal Church (USA) titles
| Preceded by George William Peterkin | 2nd Bishop of West Virginia; 1916 – 1939 | Succeeded by Robert E.L. Strider |
