= Wilburn C. Campbell =

The Right Reverend Wilburn Camrock Campbell D.D.
- IV Bishop of West Virginia
- Province: Episcopal Church
- Diocese: West Virginia
- In office: 1955–1976
- Predecessor: Robert E.L. Strider
- Successor: Robert P. Atkinson
- Previous post: Coadjutor Bishop of West Virginia (1950-1955)

Orders
- Ordination: February 1936 by Frank W. Creighton
- Consecration: May 18, 1950 by Henry St. George Tucker

Personal details
- Born: November 8, 1910 Waynesville, North Carolina, United States
- Died: July 29, 1997 (aged 86) Summersville, West Virginia, United States
- Denomination: Anglican
- Parents: Wilburn Camrock Campbell & Stella Cornelia Brown
- Spouse: Janet Louise Jobson
- Children: 2

Wilburn Camrock Campbell (November 8, 1910 - July 29, 1997) became the fourth Bishop of West Virginia in the Episcopal Church in the United States, after working with Bishop Robert E.L. Strider as coadjutor for five years.

== Early and family life ==
Born in Waynesville, North Carolina, the son on Wilburn Camrock Campbell and Stella Cornelia Brown Campbell. He was educated at Kenyon College, Amherst College (graduating in 1932) and Bexley Hall divinity school. An athlete lettering in baseball and soccer as well as a welterweight boxing champion, Campbell later studied theology at the General Theological Seminary, and subsequently received several honorary degrees, including from Concord College in Athens, West Virginia. His elder brother Hugh Brown Campbell became a lawyer and judge of the North Carolina Court of Appeals.

== Career ==
After his GTS graduation, The Rev. Campbell was ordained a deacon in June 1935 and priest the following year. Between 1935 and 1943, he served parishes in the Episcopal Diocese of Long Island: St. Stephen's Church, Port Washington; St. Luke's, Sea Cliff, 1936–39; and All Saints', Brooklyn. In 1943–1946, he chaired the Presiding Bishop's Committee on Layman's Work. Then he moved to the Episcopal Diocese of Pittsburgh to serve as rector of the Episcopal Church of the Ascension. While holding that position until 1950, The Rev. Campbell also founded a boys' school that became St. Edmund's Academy in Squirrel Hill.

In 1950, a year after West Virginia's bishop Robert E. L. Strider Sr. had announced that he would retire in 1955, Rev. Campell was consecrated as his coadjutor bishop, becoming the country's youngest bishop. Presiding Bishop Henry St. George Tucker led the service at St. Matthew's Episcopal Church in Wheeling, joined by Bishop Strider and Bishop Frederick D. Goodwin of Virginia, as well as Protestant and Eastern Orthodox clergy.

Bishop Campbell succeeded The Rt.Rev. Strider in 1955, and in the next two decades became known for his work promoting racial justice. Bishop Campbell frequently assigned clergy of one race to parishes dominated by another race, and in 1964 issued a letter to 16 faiths calling for joint efforts on behalf of racial equality.

After his retirement in 1976, The Rt.Rev. Campbell served for several years as vicar of St. Martins in the Fields Episcopal Church in Summerville, West Virginia.

== Death and legacy ==
The Rt.Rev. Campbell died in a Summersville nursing home, survived by his wife, Janet Jobson Campbell, a son, a daughter and five grandchildren. The University of North Carolina library has papers relating to him.

== See also ==
- List of Succession of Bishops for the Episcopal Church, USA

Episcopal Church (USA) titles
Preceded by Robert E. L. Strider Sr.	4th Bishop of West Virginia; 1955 – 1976	Succeeded by Robert P. Atkinson
