= Rebekah Dulaney Peterkin =

American philanthropist (1847–1891)

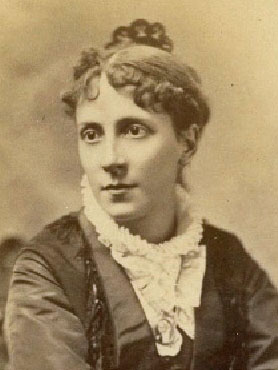
- Born: September 24, 1847; Berryville, Virginia
- Died: July 26, 1891 (aged 43); Cambridge, Maryland

Rebekah Dulaney Peterkin (also known as Rebecca Dulany Peterkin; September 24, 1847 – July 26, 1891) was an American philanthropist who founded the first circle of the International Order of the King's Daughters and Sons in Virginia, and then the Sheltering Arms Hospital in Richmond.

== Early and family life ==
Born in Berryville, Virginia as the youngest child of Rev. Joshua Peterkin of Baltimore, Maryland (1814–1892) and his wife Elizabeth Howard Hanson (1820–1910), Rebekah Peterkin had a brother, future West Virginia bishop George W. Peterkin and a sister, Mary Beall Peterkin (1842–1857).

During the American Civil War, she assisted her mother and Capt. Sally Tompkins in Richmond hospitals. After the war, and the evacuation fire which destroyed much of Richmond and the livelihoods of many Richmonders, she grew keenly aware of the problems of members of her father's parish, St. James Church, many of whom could not afford medical or hospital care.

== Sheltering Arms Hospital ==
In 1883, Peterkin helped found the first Virginia circle (chapter) of the International Order of the King's Daughters and Sons, a Christian charitable organization. Six years later, after she convinced the owner of a local boarding house (a mansion before the war) to allow the organization to use the building rent-free and a physician to donate his services. The group secured supplies and established Sheltering Arms Hospital to serve those unable to afford medical care. It was incorporated in March, 1891, with Peterkin serving as treasurer and R. Moses D. Hoge Jr, son of the minister of Second Presbyterian Church as warden.

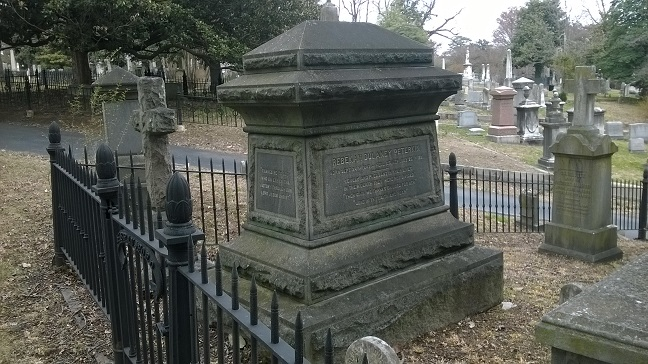
Rebecca Peterkin memorial at Hollywood cemetery

== Death and legacy ==
Peterkin died in Cambridge, Maryland on July 26, 1891, and was interred with her parents and sister at Hollywood Cemetery in Richmond. Her brother, the Rt. Rev. George W. Peterkin, donated an alms basin to Christ Church (Easton, Maryland) in her memory in 1896.

The hospital she founded still exists in Richmond, transferring to a larger building in 1892, rebuilt in 1965 (with a room named in her honor) and now operating as a rehabilitation facility. Her mother, Elizabeth Hanson Peterkin, assumed leadership of the Kings Daughters circle upon Rebekah's death, and maintained that role until her death in 1910; her niece, Constance Lee Peterkin (1872–1948), carried on that work. The Peterkin Guild, once the Altar guild of St. James Episcopal Church, still exists to support the medical facility and other charitable activities. The hospital stopped its former practice of never sending patients bills when it converted to a rehabilitation facility in 1991.

In 2018 the Virginia Capitol Foundation announced that Peterkin's name would be on the Virginia Women's Monument's glass Wall of Honor.
