= Robert E. L. Strider Sr. =

American Episcopal bishop (1887–1969)

The Right Reverend Robert E. L. Strider D.D
- III Bishop of West Virginia
- Province: Episcopal Church
- Diocese: West Virginia
- In office: 1939–1955
- Predecessor: William Loyall Gravatt
- Successor: Wilburn C. Campbell
- Previous post: Coadjutor Bishop of Maryland (1923-1939)

Orders
- Ordination: June 16, 1912 by William Loyall Gravatt
- Consecration: November 1, 1923 by William Loyall Gravatt

Personal details
- Born: April 9, 1887 Leetown, West Virginia, United States
- Died: August 8, 1968 (aged 81) Leetown, West Virginia, United States
- Buried: Shepherdstown, West Virginia, United States
- Denomination: Anglican
- Spouse: Mary Manning Holroyd (m. 1915); Eleanor Armstrong Greer (m. 1921); Ethel Knorr Stover (m. 1941)
- Children: 4

Robert Edward Lee Strider (April 9, 1887 – August 8, 1969) was the third Bishop of West Virginia in the Episcopal Church in the United States.

== Early life and education ==
The first native West Virginian to become Bishop of West Virginia, Strider was born in Leetown, Jefferson County, West Virginia and educated in the town's one-room schoolhouse. Classmates included future bishop of Tennessee Edmund P. Dandridge and future U.S. Army general John P. Lucas.

== Ministry ==
Rev. Strider was rector at St. Matthew's Episcopal Church in Wheeling, West Virginia when elected bishop coadjutor to Rt.Rev. William Loyall Gravatt in 1923. Although he had been handling diocesan affairs for several years, he formally succeeded Bishop Gravatt in 1939, and retired as announced after his 68th birthday in 1955. He lived most of his life at Rose Hill Farm in Kearneysville, West Virginia.

During his episcopate, the diocese established the Peterkin Camp and Conference Center in Romney, West Virginia, which he consecrated in 1946. Since 1928, Christian youth groups had used the Jackson 4H camp, and appreciated a camp of their own. The diocese also received a significant bequest, Sandscrest Farms near Oglebay outside Wheeling, which was intended to become a retirement facility, but which became a conference center. The diocese also closed the Sheltering Arms hospital, which had ceased operations in 1924, after a plan to merge with Charleston General Hospital fell through, and a new highway was routed through the grounds, leading to years of appraisal litigation. More than 2500 people attended Bishop Strider's retirement ceremony.

His successor was William Camrock Campbell, who had begun administrative diocesan service before World War II.

== Personal life ==
Strider married three times and survived two wives: Mary Manning Holroyd Strider (1887 - 1917, with whom he had a son and namesake) and Eleanor Armstrong Greer Strider (1889 - 1936, with whom he had two daughters and a son), although he was survived by Ethel K Stover Strider (1915 - 1971). His son, Robert E.L. Strider II, after graduation from Episcopal High School in Alexandria and Harvard College and wartime naval service, became a professor of English and served as President of Colby College in Maine from 1960 to 1979.

== Death and legacy ==
Bishop Strider was buried at Elmwood Cemetery in Shepherdstown, West Virginia. The chapel at the Peterkin Camp is named in his honor.

== See also ==
- List of Succession of Bishops for the Episcopal Church, USA

Episcopal Church (USA) titles
Preceded by William Loyall Gravatt	3rd Bishop of West Virginia; 1939 – 1955	Succeeded by Wilburn C. Campbell
