= Sally Louisa Tompkins =

Confederate Army nurse

Captain Sally Louisa Tompkins
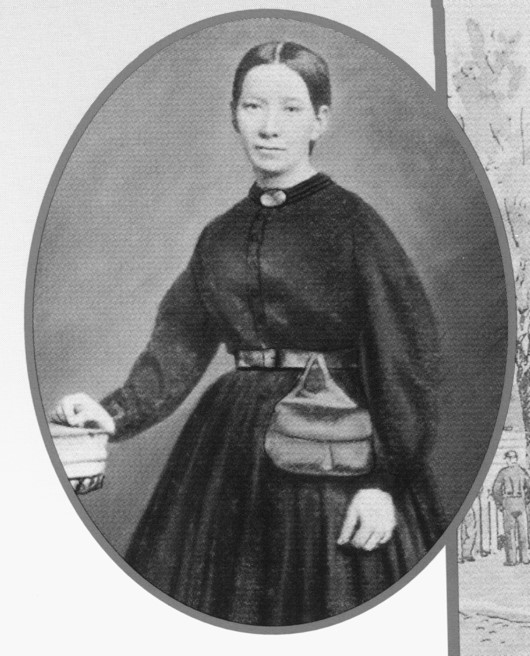
- Born: November 9, 1833; Mathews County, Virginia
- Died: July 25, 1916 (aged 82)
- Occupation(s): Confederate States Army Medical Corps Captain and nurse
- Relatives: Clementina Tompkins (niece)

Sally Louisa Tompkins (November 9, 1833 – July 25, 1916) was a Confederate nurse and the first woman to have been formally inducted into an army in American history. She may have been the only woman officially commissioned in the Confederate Army. She is best remembered for privately sponsoring a hospital in Richmond, Virginia to treat soldiers wounded in the American Civil War. Under her supervision, she had the lowest death rate of any hospital Union or Confederate, during the Civil War. She has been remembered as the "Angel of the Confederacy".

== Early life ==
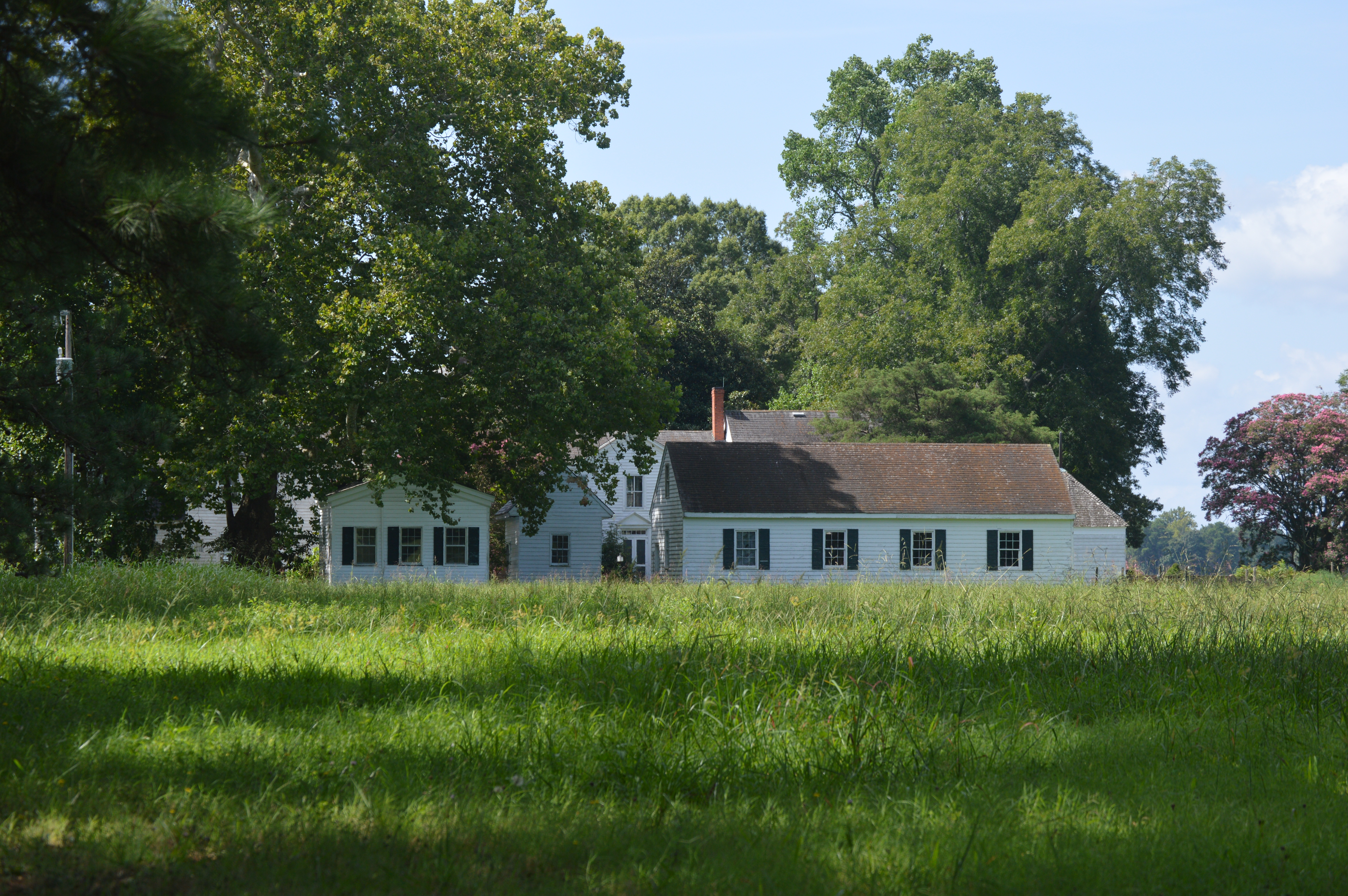
Poplar Grove, Tompkins' birthplace

Sally Tompkins was born on November 9, 1833, at Poplar Grove in the Tidewater Region of Virginia's Middle Peninsula. She was the daughter of Maria Patterson and Colonel Christopher Tompkins. Colonel Tompkins eventually became a very wealthy merchant, doing business in Mathews County, Norfolk, and Richmond, Virginia. On August 16, 1838, Colonel Tompkins died. Sally was almost five years old at the time.

Tompkins' older sister, Elizabeth, had been active in restoring the local Christ Church, an Episcopal church that had fallen into disrepair. Elizabeth and Sally were very close to each other. Tompkins was devastated when three of her sisters (Martha, Harriet, and Elizabeth) died only a few weeks apart due to a local epidemic in 1842. Tompkins nursed the sick in the local community, both free and enslaved.

Details of Tompkins' childhood are unknown since many records have not survived. What is known is that Tompkins, her mother, and her surviving sister, Maria, left Poplar Grove and lived in Norfolk from 1849 to 1852. While in Norfolk, Tompkins and her sister studied at the Norfolk Female Institute. In January 1854, Tompkins, her mother, and Maria moved to Richmond, Virginia. Tompkins' mother died a few months later. Since the Tompkins family had done business in Richmond for many years, Tompkins and her sister were welcomed with open arms. They rented rooms in the city not knowing that Richmond would soon become the epicenter of the Civil War.

== Angel of the Confederacy ==
Richmond became the capital city of the Confederacy after Virginia became one of the last of the Confederate states to secede from the Union in April 1861. It was generally thought by both North and South alike that the armed conflict would end quickly. After the first battle, the nation realized that the war would be much longer than they imagined.

The First Battle of Bull Run—also known as the First Battle of Manassas—on July 21, 1861, was a Southern tactical victory that opened the Civil War in the first major hand-to-hand combat. Despite the word of victory, the Confederate capital city was ill-prepared for the hundreds of wounded soldiers who subsequently poured in, many arriving via the Virginia Central Railroad. The shock brought the reality of the horrors of warfare directly home, as officials and citizens scrambled to take care of the overflow of injured and sick patients. Official hospitals were filled. Factories, churches, and even homes became temporary hospitals to accommodate the wounded.

At nearly 28 years old, Tompkins was among the civilians who responded by opening the home of Judge John Robertson as a hospital. Judge Robertson had taken his family to the countryside for safety and left his home to Sally to use as a hospital for as long as she needed. Sally was not alone in this effort. Many ladies from the Saint James Episcopal Church, as well as several enslaved people, ran what became known as Robertson Hospital. The women of Saint James Episcopal were collectively known as "The Ladies of Robertson Hospital." Robertson Hospital became one of the South's biggest wartime hospitals.

After the initial crisis had passed, Confederate President Jefferson Davis instituted regulations requiring military hospitals to be under military command. The Robertson Hospital had done such good work and was prepared to continue, that Confederate President Jefferson Davis commissioned Tompkins as a captain so that she could continue her work. She and Lucy Otey of Lynchburg were officially commissioned as officers in the Confederate States Army. She refused any payment for her services. On her military commission, dated September 9, 1861, she wrote, "I accepted the commission as Captain in the C.S.A. when it was offered. But, I would not allow my name to be placed upon the payroll of the army."

The Robertson Hospital treated patients continuously throughout the war, discharging its last soldier on June 13, 1865. During its four-year existence, Robertson Hospital treated 1,334 wounded with only seventy-three deaths, the lowest mortality rate of any military hospital during the Civil War. Author and Civil War diarist Mary Chesnut was a frequent visitor to the hospital. She recorded "Our Florence Nightingale is Sally Tompkins." Another diarist, Judith McGuire, was a volunteer at the hospital and included many vivid descriptions of nursing the patients while there.

Running a hospital was not without its trials. Richmond depended on imports for trade and when the blockade tightened along the coast, the city faced riots in the streets. When supplies were difficult to get within the city, The Robertson Hospital hired a blockade runner to bring necessities from abroad.

Since Tompkins and a number of the other women had remained constant at the hospital through the war, they ultimately won the love and respect of their patients. Tompkins received many marriage proposals from former patients out of gratitude for what she had done, all of which she declined. More than 1,300 men fortunate to be sent to Robertson Hospital called her simply "Captain Sally."

== After the War ==
When Richmond was evacuated in April 1865, Sally and several volunteers chose to stay at the hospital to treat the last of the patients. Through negotiation with the Union medical director, Sally was allowed to keep her hospital open for another two months after the war.

Once the hospital was finally closed, Tompkins traveled around Virginia visiting many old friends and relatives. She also volunteered to teach Sunday school at the St. James Episcopal Church and remained an active member there for most of her life.

Sally was a local hero in Richmond. She hosted a reunion for her patients in the Grand Confederate Reunion of 1896. Veterans travelled near and far to pay their respects to the woman who had saved their lives so many years prior. She remained unmarried throughout her life and stayed active for many years in charitable work. Eventually, Tompkins' family fortune ran out, and she went to live in the Confederate Women's Home as an honored guest in 1905.

== Death, legacy ==
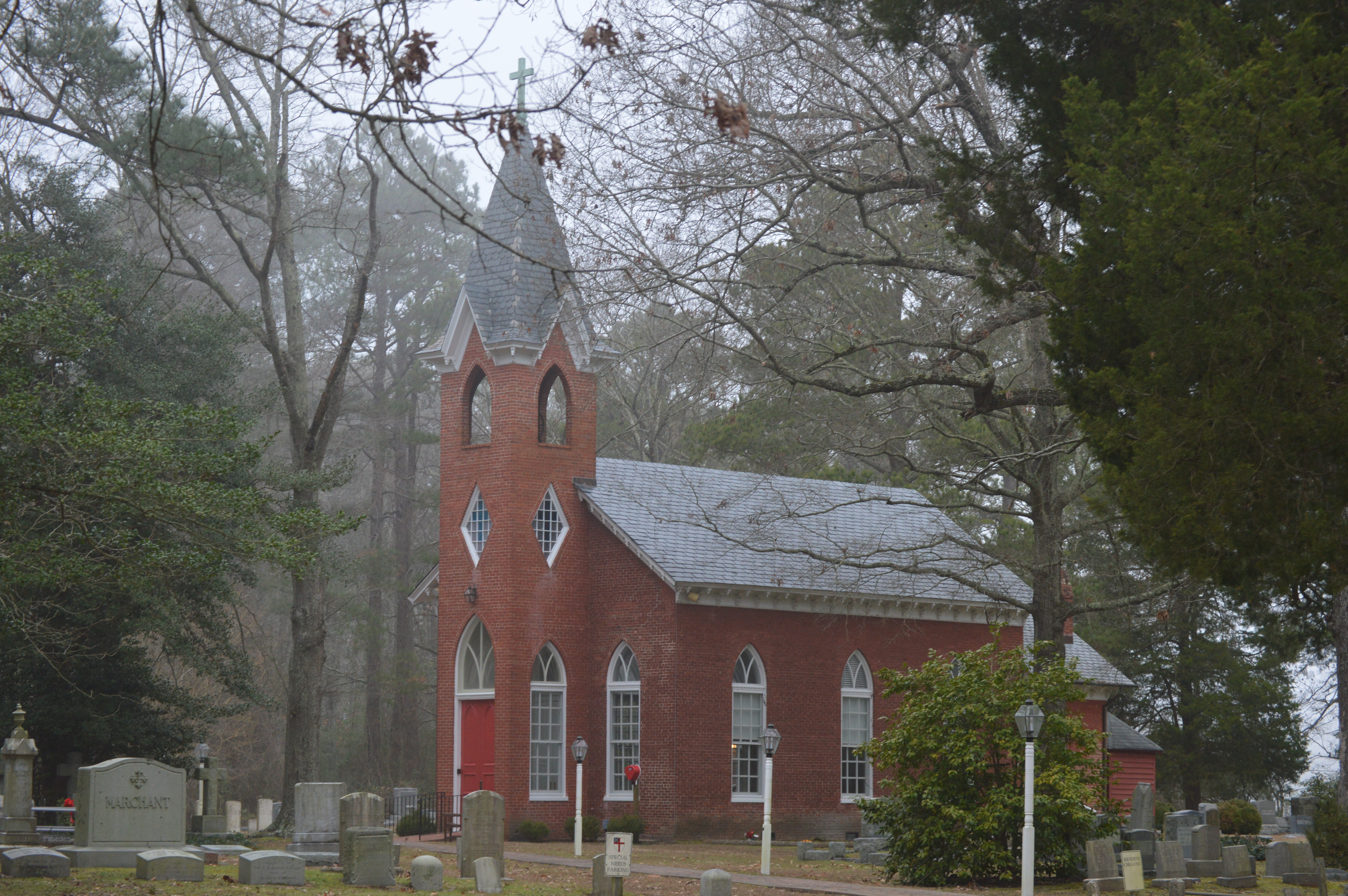
Christ Church (1905 structure) with cemetery

Upon her death in 1916, Sally Tompkins was buried with full military honors at Christ Church in Mathews County. She joins the ranks of women like Clara Barton who responded to the urgent needs which were presented during the Civil War, especially after the Battle of First Bull Run when the realities of warfare became stark in both the Union and Confederate capital cities. They helped develop nursing into the skilled profession it was to become. Sally Tompkins reported obsession with cleanliness led to progress in sanitation during treatment. Her proven lower mortality rates as a result are exceptionally notable among her many legacies to the United States and medical providers everywhere, practices still in widespread use.

A number of monuments commemorate Captain Sally and the Robertson Hospital. In 1910, Sally unveiled a marker on the site where the Robertson Hospital once stood. Today, the marker still stands, but the original hospital building no longer survives. The site today is a 24-hour diner. There are also a number of Virginia historical markers in her hometown, dedicated to her life.

During the Civil War Centennial in the 1960s, there were a number of efforts made to honor Tompkins' legacy. One of which was a stained glass memorial window in the St. James Episcopal Church depicting Captain Sally overseen by an angel. There was also an effort to put a statue of Captain Sally on Monument Avenue in Richmond. The design for the statue was done by the surrealist artist Salvador Dalí and sparked outrage throughout the city. Thus the plan to build a statue to her was never completed.

Three chapters of the United Daughters of the Confederacy are named after Tompkins, who was elected Honorary President of the Virginia Division in 1905. One of the chapters was founded in her hometown of Mathews, Virginia and was chartered in 1908 as the Captain Sallie Tompkins Chapter. It was deactivated in 1955.

Following an article in the local newspaper in July 1999, a small group of "daughters" met and resolved to bring a chapter back to Mathews. Since Sally's name was misspelled in the 1908 charter the group decided to petition as a new chapter with a new number, which became effective on August 22, 2000.

So far, there are two published books dedicated to Tompkins life. The first one is a book of poetry based on Sally's life called Dearest of Captains. The second, is a biography written by a distant relative of Tompkins' called The Lady With the Milk White Hands.

Tompkins was the aunt of painter Clementina Tompkins.
