= George William Peterkin =

Episcopal Bishop of West Virginia

The Right Reverend George William Peterkin D.D., LL.D.
- I Bishop of West Virginia
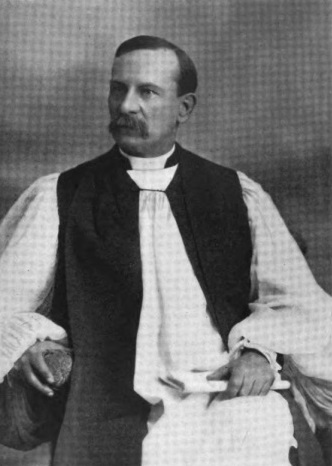
- Peterkin in 1904
- Church: Episcopal Church
- Diocese: West Virginia
- Elected: March 1, 1878
- In office: 1878–1916
- Successor: William Loyall Gravatt

Orders
- Ordination: June 25, 1869 by Francis McNeece Whittle
- Consecration: May 30, 1878 by Gregory T. Bedell

Personal details
- Born: March 21, 1841 Clear Spring, Maryland
- Died: September 22, 1916 (aged 75) Parkersburg, West Virginia
- Buried: Hollywood Cemetery
- Denomination: Anglican
- Parents: Joshua Peterkin & Elizabeth Howard Hanson
- Spouse: Constance Lee Peterkin (d. 1877), Marion MacIntosh Stewart Peterkin (1849–1942)
- Children: 2

George William Peterkin (March 21, 1841 – September 22, 1916) was the first Bishop of West Virginia in the Episcopal Church in the United States.

== Early life ==
Born in Clear Spring, Washington County, Maryland as first child of Rev. Joshua Peterkin of Baltimore, Maryland (1814–1892) and his wife Elizabeth Howard Hanson, George Peterkin had two younger sisters, Mary Beall Peterkin (1842–1857) and Rebekah Dulaney Peterkin. He was educated at the Episcopal High School in Alexandria, Virginia. He attended the University of Virginia until the American Civil War interrupted his studies to become a priest like his father. Peterkin joined the 21st Virginia Infantry in Richmond, and after the battle of Seven Pines in 1862 joined the staff of artillery General William N. Pendleton, who had been a priest in Maryland before the war and knew his father. As General Pendleton's aide, Lieutenant Peterkin witnessed the surrender ceremony at Appomattox.

== Ministry ==
After the war, Peterkin attended Virginia Theological Seminary and graduated in 1868. Ordained a priest the following year, Peterkin served parishes in Virginia and Maryland. When the General Convention created the Diocese of West Virginia in 1877, and the new diocese's first choice as bishop, Rev. Eccleston of New Jersey turned down the position, Peterkin, who had recently manage to reorganize the finances and ministry of Memorial Church in Baltimore, was elected its first bishop. On May 30, 1878, he was consecrated at the new diocese's largest church, St. Matthew's in Wheeling.

Bishop Peterkin established his home at Parkersburg, West Virginia and during the next 24 years visited every county in West Virginia, increasing the Episcopal Church's influence in the state. He consecrated 37 churches, and conducted numerous ordinations in his diocese and four in Brazil. He also served as a missionary in Puerto Rico. In 1887 Bishop Peterkin founded Sheltering Arms Hospital in Hansford, to provide medical care for coal miners, and two years later his sister Rebekah founded a similar hospital in Richmond in a former mansion. In 1891, Bishop Peterkin consecrated the Memorial Church of the Good Shepherd in Parkersburg, which began as a mission to the "wild boys" of the city's east end, as a memorial to his two sons who had died young. In 1892, Peterkin published Records of the Protestant Episcopal Church in West Virginia.

In 1899, the diocesan convention elected William Loyall Gravatt as his coadjutator, as Bishop Peterkin contemplated retirement, after the deaths of his father and sister as the decade began. In 1901, Bishop Peterkin helped erect a cross memorial to Confederate soldiers from his 21st Virginia regiment and those of the 15th Virginia on Valley Mountain in Randolph County, West Virginia. He retired the following year, succeeded by Bishop Gravatt, who moved the diocesan headquarters to Charleston.

== Family ==
Peterkin married twice. His first wife, Constance Gardner Lee Peterkin, died in 1877, and left behind two young children, William Gardner Peterkin (1870–1941), and Constance Lee Peterkin (1872–1948). He remarried and was survived by his second wife, Marion MacIntosh Stewart Peterkin (1849–1942).

== Death and legacy ==
Peterkin died at his home in Parkersburg in 1916, and is buried at Hollywood Cemetery in Richmond, Virginia, along with his father, and sister. The retreat center for the Episcopal Diocese of West Virginia in Romney is named in his honor.

== See also ==
Edward Lee Strider, The Life and Work of George William Peterkin (G. W. Jacobs & Co. 1929)

- List of Succession of Bishops for the Episcopal Church, USA

Episcopal Church (USA) titles
Preceded by	1st Bishop of West Virginia; 1878 – 1902	Succeeded by William Loyall Gravatt
