= Episcopal Diocese of West Virginia =

Diocese of the Episcopal Church in the United States

Coordinates: 39°N 80.5°W

Diocese of West Virginia

Location
- Country: United States
- Territory: West Virginia
- Ecclesiastical province: Province III

Statistics
- Congregations: 56 (2025)
- Members: 5,020 (2025)

Information
- Denomination: Episcopal Church
- Established: December 5, 1877

Current leadership
- Bishop: Matthew Davis Cowden

Map
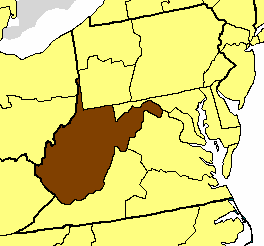
- Location of the Diocese of West Virginia

Website
- www.wvdiocese.org

The Episcopal Diocese of West Virginia is a diocese of the Episcopal Church in the United States of America (TEC). It encompasses all 55 counties of West Virginia. The diocese has 66 congregations, including 38 parishes, 26 missions, and 2 other churches. The diocese is headquartered in Charleston and led by the Rt. Rev. Matthew Davis Cowden who was consecrated as bishop coadjutor in March 2022 and became bishop diocesan in October 2022.

In 2025, the diocese reported average Sunday attendance (ASA) of 1,747 persons, a relative decrease from 2,685 in 2015. Between 2015 and 2025, reported membership decreased from 8,086 persons to 5,020. The 56 congregations of the diocese had $5,588,258 in plate and pledge income in 2025.

== History ==
=== 1700s ===
Ministry of the Church of England and its successor, the Protestant Episcopal Church, developed slowly in what is now West Virginia. The 1784 disestablishment of the Church of England in the then-unified Virginia created severe challenges for Episcopalians.

The first Episcopal Church in present-day West Virginia was established as a log structure in 1740 near Bunker Hill in Berkeley County. This chapel was founded by Colonel Morgan Morgan and known by the names Christ Episcopal Church and Morgan Chapel. Services at Morgan Chapel were led by local lay readers and by occasional priests visiting from Christ Church in Winchester, Virginia. Morgan Chapel is maintained as a historical site, but worship services are now held in nearby Zion Episcopal Church, Charles Town. Zion Church was the spiritual home of Charles Washington, Col. Lewis Washington, and John Yates Beall.

Westward expansion of white settlers in the late eighteenth century encouraged the founding of Episcopal Churches near the Ohio River. Unlike most Virginia churches, mountainous geography led many churches in West Virginia to be planted by congregations from Pennsylvania, Maryland, or Ohio. Mirroring Virginia politics, diocesan bishops based in Williamsburg and Richmond often overlooked Episcopalians living west of the Blue Ridge. Efforts of the Rev. Dr. Joseph Doddridge, a Pennsylvania-born missionary, were especially significant in establishing frontier churches in the Upper Ohio Valley. In 1793, he founded Olde St. John's Episcopal Church in Colliers. It remains the oldest continuously active Episcopalian congregation in West Virginia.

=== 1800s ===
In the absence of episcopal visitations from the bishop of Virginia, Bishop William White of Pennsylvania consecrated St. Matthew's Episcopal Church in Wheeling, West Virginia as the nineteenth century began. By 1851, Episcopalians in the northwestern mountain counties petitioned Bishop William Meade of Virginia to provide the mountain region its own bishop. Meade demurred even though he had previously founded St. John's Episcopal Church, Charleston, in 1837, and serviced these parishes both while affiliated with Christ Church, Winchester, and later as assistant bishop of Virginia. When John Johns became his assistant bishop, he likewise conducted periodic visitations into the western counties of Virginia. However, with the outbreak of the American Civil War, episcopal visitations ceased. In 1863, shortly before West Virginia's incorporation as a state, St. Matthew's Church, Wheeling, asked permission for another bishop to visit the parish, but like his predecessor, Bishop Johns demurred, asking instead for a safe-conduct to visit the area, which he did not obtain.

After the Civil War, the six northwestern counties remained part of the Diocese of Virginia for more than a decade. By 1876, Virginia's diocesan council (a name analogous to diocesan conventions elsewhere) agreed to support the creation of a separate diocese for the state of West Virginia, which the national General Convention approved in 1877.

At the organizational meeting led by Virginia bishop Francis McNeece Whittle (who chose to remain with the larger diocese), 14 clergy and 16 lay delegates agreed to extend an invitation to the Rev. J.H. Eccleston of Newark, New Jersey to become their new bishop, but his congregation pointed out to him the missionary nature of the new diocese and questioned its ability to financially support a bishop and other diocesan officers. He refused the call. The following year, the clerical and lay delegates met again and finally decided to call the Rev. George William Peterkin, who accepted the call and was consecrated by bishops of Virginia, Maryland and Kentucky at the new diocese's largest church, St. Matthew's Church in Wheeling on May 30, 1878.

Although the churches in Wheeling and Charleston had also offered to build rectories for the new bishop, Peterkin chose to accept the offer from the Parkersburg congregation. He thus made the town diocesan headquarters and ultimately succeeded in raising the funds and building the Church of the Good Shepherd in Parkersburg in 1891.

=== 1900s ===
In 1899, Peterkin found visitations increasingly difficult and asked for a bishop coadjutor, the diocesan convention elected the Rev. William Loyall Gravatt of Zion Episcopal Church in Charles Town, West Virginia. Upon Bishop Peterkin's death in 1916, Gravatt moved the diocesan headquarters to Charleston, West Virginia, the state capital, where they are again today, although moved to Wheeling under the episcopate of his successor, Robert E.L. Strider.

== Diocesan Office and Retreat Centers ==
The diocese is headquartered on Virginia Street in Charleston, a few blocks from the West Virginia State Capitol, in a house known as Diocesan Center. It was donated by Helen Ruffner Ritz in 1964 in memory of her late husband, the lawyer and jurist Harold A. Ritz.

The diocese also has two spiritual retreat centers. Since 1944, Peterkin Camp and Conference Center on the South Branch of the Potomac River near Romney has been used for Christian Education retreats and summer camps. In the early 1950s, the diocese acquired Sandscrest Farms near Oglebay Park in Wheeling as a bequest from philanthropists Harry and Helen Turner Sands. Originally envisioned as an Episcopalian retirement home, Sandscrest Conference and Retreat Center now operates as a nonprofit, spiritual retreat center with the mission "…to provide a place in which to nourish the soul, mind, and body through the spirit of Jesus Christ."

== Roll of Bishops ==
1. George William Peterkin (1878-1916)
  - William Loyall Gravatt, bishop coadjutor (1899-1916)
2. William Loyall Gravatt (1916-1939)
  - Robert E.L. Strider Sr., bishop coadjutor (1923-1939)
3. Robert E.L. Strider Sr. (1939–1955)
  - Wilburn C. Campbell, bishop coadjutor (1950-1955)
4. Wilburn C. Campbell (1955-1976)
  - Robert P. Atkinson, bishop coadjutor (1973-1976)
5. Robert P. Atkinson (1976-1988)
6. John H. Smith (1989-1999)
  * Charles Vaché, assisting bishop (1999–2001)
7. W. Michie Klusmeyer (2001- 2022)
  * Mark Van Koevering assistant bishop (2016–2018)
  * Matthew Davis Cowden, bishop coadjutor (2022)
8. Matthew Davis Cowden (2022 -)
