= Diocese of Central Pennsylvania =

The Diocese of Central Pennsylvania could refer to either

- The original Diocese of Central Pennsylvania of the Protestant Episcopal Church in the United States of America created in 1871 and renamed the Episcopal Diocese of Bethlehem in 1909
- The current Episcopal Diocese of Central Pennsylvania, which was originally created as the Diocese of Harrisburg when that diocese split from the first Diocese of Central Pennsylvania in 1905 and adopted its current name in the 1970s.
