= Province 3 =

Province 3 could refer to:

- Bagmati Province, Nepal
- Province 3 of the Episcopal Church, United States
