= Nathan Baxter =

Nathan Baxter may refer to:

- Nathan D. Baxter (born 1948), American bishop
- Nathan Baxter (footballer) (born 1998), English footballer
