= Paul V. Marshall =

American author and Episcopalian prelate (1947–2024)

The Right Reverend Paul Victor Marshall
- Bishop of Bethlehem
- Church: Episcopal Church
- Diocese: Bethlehem
- Elected: December 2, 1995
- In office: 1996–2013
- Predecessor: Mark Dyer
- Successor: Kevin Donnelly Nichols

Orders
- Ordination: 1978
- Consecration: June 29, 1996 by Robert D. Rowley

Personal details
- Born: July 25, 1947 New York City, New York, U.S.
- Died: October 21, 2024 (aged 77)
- Denomination: Anglican (prev. Lutheran)
- Spouse: Diana
- Children: 2

Paul Victor Marshall (July 25, 1947 – October 21, 2024) was an American author and prelate, who served as Bishop of Bethlehem from June 29, 1996 to December 31, 2013.

== Biography ==
Marshall was born in 1947 in New York City to Victor William Marshall (1919-2008) and Frances Mary Augusta Doerrie Marshall (1923-2010); he was raised in Lancaster County, Pennsylvania. He grew up in the Lutheran Church–Missouri Synod (LCMS). He received his B.A. from Concordia College (Indiana) in 1969 and his M. Div. from Concordia Seminary (Missouri) in 1973. He was ordained as a pastor in the LCMS. Between 1972 and 1977, he served as a chaplain in the US Army, after which he joined the Episcopal Church and was ordained deacon and priest in 1978 for the Diocese of Fond du Lac.

He earned his Doctor of Theology from General Theological Seminary in 1982, where he was a Fellow and Lecturer in Homiletics, Latin and Liturgics between 1979 and 1982. Between 1979 and 1982, he served as assistant at Holy Trinity Church in Long Island, New York, after which he became rector of Christ Church in Babylon, New York. Subsequently, he was also professor of Liturgics and Homiletics and chaplain at the George Mercer School of Theology in Garden City, New York. In 1989, he became an associate professor at Yale Divinity School.

On December 2, 1995, Marshall was elected as the eighth Bishop of Bethlehem on the third ballot during the diocesan convention. He was consecrated on June 29, 1996, by Bishop Robert D. Rowley of Northwestern Pennsylvania, and co-consecrated by Mark Dyer and Lloyd E. Gressle, both former Bishops of Bethlehem, in St Stephen's Pro-Cathedral, Wilkes-Barre, Pennsylvania.

During his tenure, the Diocese of Bethlehem in 2001 formed a companionship relationship with the Diocese of Kajo-Keji in the southernmost part of South Sudan, along the Ugandan border. In 2007, the New Hope capital campaign was launched, with the majority of its goal dedicated to Kajo-Keji. By 2012 five elementary schools, two secondary schools and a college had been constructed in Kajo-Keji with the funds collected in the Diocese of Bethlehem.

Marshall retired on December 31, 2013, citing age. He died on October 21, 2024, at the age of 77.

== Bibliography ==
- (doctoral dissertation) Hamon L'Estrange and the Rise of Historical Liturgiology in Seventeenth Century England (1982)
- Anglican Liturgy in America, Vol. I, Prayer Book Parallels (New York: Church Hymnal Corporation, 1989) ISBN 9780898691818
- Preaching for the Church Today: The Skills, Prayer, and Art of Sermon Preparation (New York: Church Hymnal Corporation, 1991) ISBN 9780898691870
- Anglican Liturgy in America, Vol. II, Prayer Book Parallels 2 (New York: Church Hymnal Corporation, 1991) ISBN 9780898698503
- The Voice of a Stranger: On the Lay Origins of Anglican Liturgics (New York: Church Hymnal Corporation, 1993) ISBN 9780898692365
- Anglican Liturgy in America. Vol III, One, Catholic, and Apostolic: Samuel Seabury and the Early Episcopal Church (New York: Church Hymnal Corporation, 2000) ISBN 9780898694246
- Same Sex Unions: Stories and Rites (New York: Church Publishing International, 2005) ISBN 9780898694178
- The Bishop Is Coming!: A Practical Guide for Bishops and Congregations (New York: Church Publishing International, 2007) ISBN 9780898695427
- Messages on the Mall. Looking at Life in 600 Words or Less (New York: Seabury Books, 2008) ISBN 9781596270817
