= Diocese of Harrisburg =

Diocese of Harrisburg may refer to:

- Roman Catholic Diocese of Harrisburg
- Episcopal Diocese of Central Pennsylvania or the Episcopal Diocese of Harrisburg
