= Dean T. Stevenson =

American bishop

The Right Reverend Dean Theodore Stevenson S.T.D.
- Bishop of Central Pennsylvania
- Church: Episcopal Church
- Diocese: Central Pennsylvania
- Elected: June 28, 1966
- In office: 1966–1982
- Predecessor: J. Thomas Heistand
- Successor: Charlie F. McNutt

Orders
- Ordination: December 14, 1940 by Frank W. Sterrett
- Consecration: October 13, 1966 by John E. Hines

Personal details
- Born: August 16, 1915 Pottsville, Pennsylvania, United States
- Died: November 6, 1994 (aged 79) Lemoyne, Pennsylvania, United States
- Denomination: Anglican
- Parents: Paul Arthur Stevenson & Martha Taylor
- Spouse: Doris Quier
- Children: 3

Dean Theodore Stevenson (August 16, 1915 – November 6, 1994) was bishop of the Episcopal Diocese of Central Pennsylvania from 1966 to 1982.

As a college football player at Lehigh University in Bethlehem, Pennsylvania, he was named an All American by Sports Illustrated in 1962.

== Early life and education ==
Stevenson was born in Pottsville, Pennsylvania, on August 16, 1915, the son of Paul Arthur Stevenson and Martha Taylor. He was married to Doris Quier; they had two sons, James and Frederick, and a daughter, Ruth.

After graduating from Pottsville High School, he studied at Lehigh University in Bethlehem, Pennsylvania, where he graduated in 1937.

After receiving a Baccalaureate in Sacred Theology degree from the General Theological Seminary in New York City in 1940, he completed his master's degree at Lehigh University in 1949 and was awarded an honorary Doctor of Sacred Theology from General Theological Seminary in 1962.

== Ministry ==
Stevenson was ordained as a deacon on May 28, 1940, and as a priest on December 14, 1940. He then became curate of the Cathedral Church of the Nativity in Bethlehem, Pennsylvania.

Between 1940 and 1942, he was the Episcopal chaplain of Lehigh University; he also served as a chaplain in the United States Army during World War II. A member of the 361st Infantry Regiment, he was stationed in North Africa and Italy, and was awarded the Bronze Star for heroic action on the Italian front.

In 1946, he became dean of Leonard Hall in Fountain Hill, Pennsylvania, the residence for pre-theological students at Lehigh University. Subsequently, he also served as vicar of St Margaret's Church in Emmaus, Pennsylvania, and St Elizabeth's Church in Allentown, Pennsylvania.

In 1957, he was appointed Archdeacon of Bethlehem, a post he retained till his election as Bishop of Harrisburg.

== Episcopacy ==
Stevenson was twice elected bishop. The first, which he declined, took place on November 19, 1963, when he was elected as Bishop of Northern Michigan. He was elected again on June 23, 1966, this time as Bishop of Harrisburg, an election he accepted. He was consecrated on October 13, 1966, by Presiding Bishop John E. Hines.

In 1971, the name of the diocese was changed from Harrisburg and adapted the original name of the present Episcopal Diocese of Bethlehem, that of Central Pennsylvania. Hence, Stevenson became the first Bishop of the new Central Pennsylvania diocese.

== Retirement and death ==
Stevenson retired in 1982 and died at his home in Lemoyne, Pennsylvania, on November 6, 1994.
