= Kevin D. Nichols =

American episcopal bishop

The Right Reverend Kevin D. Nichols
- 9th Bishop of Bethlehem
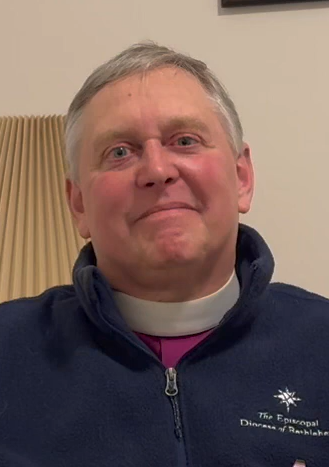
- Nichols in 2024
- Church: Episcopal Church
- Diocese: Bethlehem
- Elected: April 28, 2018
- In office: 2018–2025
- Predecessor: Paul V. Marshall
- Other posts: Assistant bishop of the Susquehanna, 2026–present

Orders
- Consecration: September 15, 2018 by Michael Curry

Personal details
- Born: United States
- Denomination: Anglican (prev. Roman Catholic)
- Spouse: Patti
- Children: 4

Kevin Donnelly Nichols is an American bishop who served as the ninth Bishop of the Episcopal Diocese of Bethlehem from 2018 to 2025. Since the reunification of the Diocese of Bethlehem with the Diocese of Central Pennsylvania on January 1, 2026, he has been assistant bishop of the Susquehanna and is scheduled to succeed diocesan bishop Audrey Scanlan as bishop provisional in 2027.

Initially ordained as a Roman Catholic priest, Nichols was received into the Episcopal priesthood in 1999. Prior to serving as Bishop of Bethlehem, Nichols worked as a rector for several small parishes in the Episcopal Diocese of New Hampshire, for which he also served as president of the diocesan Standing Committee. Nichols was also nominated and appointed as a member of the Task Force for Reimagining the Episcopal Church (TREC).

== Biography ==
Nichols was originally ordained a Roman Catholic priest after receiving his Master of Divinity from St. Mary's Seminary and University in Baltimore. On December 11, 1999 he was received into the Episcopal priesthood and became rector of St Stephen's Church in Pittsfield, New Hampshire and then of St Andrew's Church in Hopkinton, New Hampshire. He was also chief operating officer and canon for mission resources in the Diocese of New Hampshire.

On April 28, 2018, Nichols was elected Bishop of Bethlehem on the first ballot of a special convention that took place in the Cathedral Church of the Nativity in Bethlehem, Pennsylvania. He was consecrated on September 15, 2018, at the First Presbyterian Church in Allentown, Pennsylvania by Presiding Bishop Michael Curry. He was installed in the Cathedral of the Nativity on October 12, 2018.

== See also ==
- List of Episcopal bishops of the United States
- Historical list of the Episcopal bishops of the United States
