= Province 3 of the Episcopal Church =

United States Ecclesiastical Province

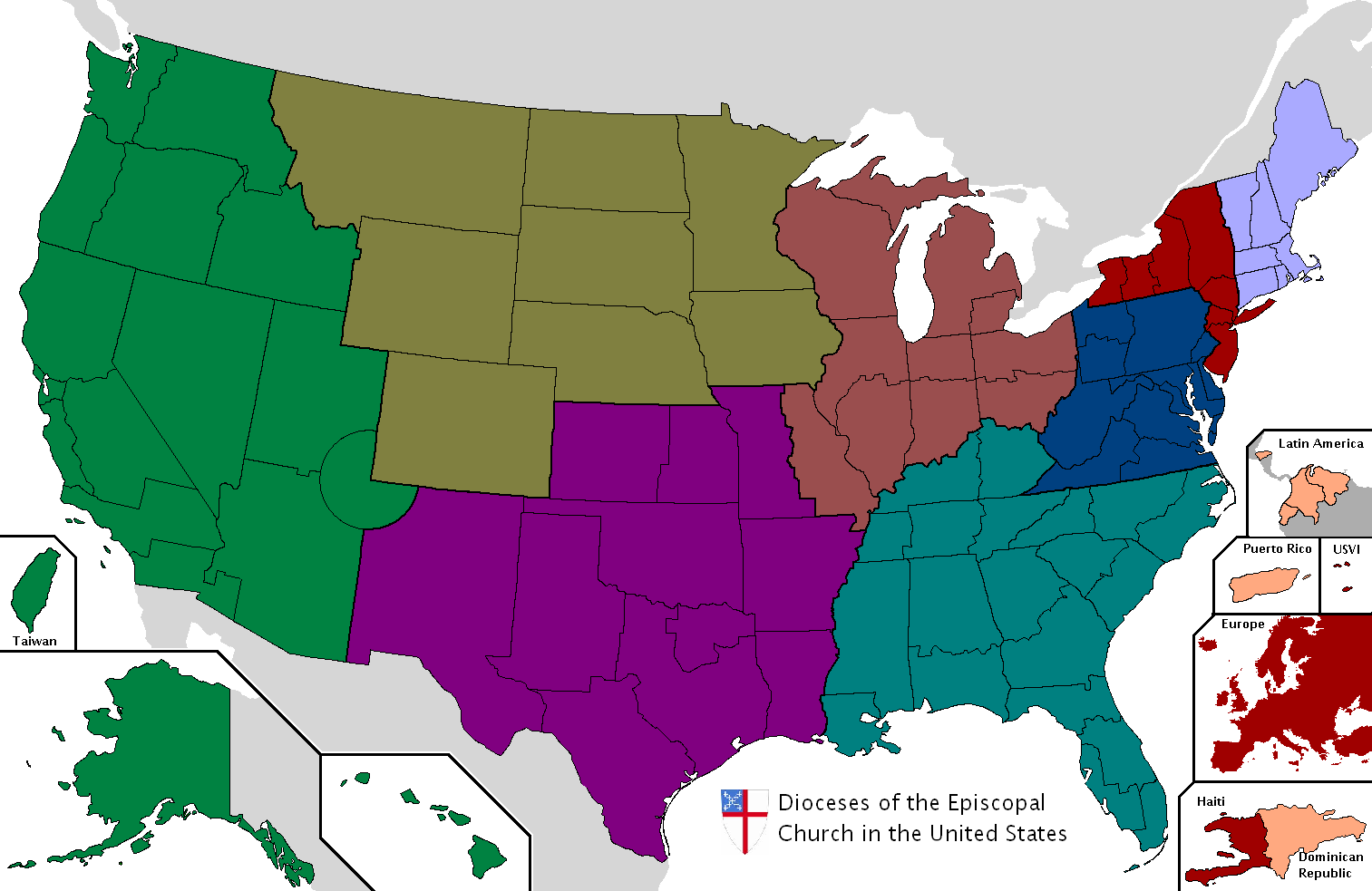
Province III of the ECUSA

Province 3 (III), also known as the Province of Washington, is one of nine ecclesiastical provinces making up the Episcopal Church in the United States of America. It comprises thirteen dioceses in the Middle Atlantic States of Delaware, Maryland, Pennsylvania, Virginia, West Virginia, as well as Washington, D.C. The Rt. Rev. Kevin S. Brown of the Diocese of Delaware serves as President.

Statistically, the province reported 290,674 members in 2015 and 223,965 members in 2023; no membership statistics were reported in 2024 national parochial reports. Plate and pledge income for the 948 filing congregations of the province in 2024 was $236,641,342. Average Sunday attendance (ASA) in 2024 was 61,047 persons. This was a decrease from ASA of 90,053 in 2015.

== Dioceses of Province III ==
Diocese	Erected	Jurisdiction	Cathedral	Current leadership (year of accession)
Diocese of Delaware	1786	Delaware	none	Kevin S. Brown (2017)
Diocese of Easton	1868	Eastern Shore of Maryland	Trinity Cathedral, Easton, MD	vacancy (2025)
Diocese of Maryland	1780	Central, Northern and Western Maryland	Cathedral of the Incarnation, Baltimore, MD	Carrie Schofield-Broadbent (2024)
Diocese of Northwestern Pennsylvania	1910	13 counties in Northwestern Pennsylvania	Cathedral of St. Paul, Erie, PA	vacancy (Bishop-electa Jenifier Chatfield to be installed in 2026, pending consent.)
Diocese of Pennsylvania	1784	Counties of Bucks, Chester, Delaware, Montgomery, and Philadelphia in Eastern Pennsylvania.	Philadelphia Episcopal Cathedral, West Philadelphia, PA	Daniel G. P. Gutierrez (2016)
Diocese of Pittsburgh	1865	11 counties in Southwestern Pennsylvania	Trinity Cathedral, Pittsburgh, PA	Ketlen A. Solak (2021)
Diocese of Southern Virginia	1892	Southeastern Virgina	none	Susan B. Haynes (2019)
Diocese of Southwestern Virginia	1919	32 counties in Southwestern Virgina	none	Karin MacPhail (2026)
Diocese of the Susquehanna	2025	39 counties in Central and Northwestern Pennsylvania	Cathedral Church of the Nativity, Bethlehem, PA (co-cathedral)	Audrey Scanlan (2026) Kevin D. Nichols, Assistant bishop (2026)
Diocese of the Susquehanna	2025	39 counties in Central and Northwestern Pennsylvania	St. Stephen's Episcopal Cathedral, Harrisburg, PA (co-cathedral)	Audrey Scanlan (2026) Kevin D. Nichols, Assistant bishop (2026)
Diocese of Virginia	1785	38 counties in CentralVirginia	The Cathedral Shrine of the Transfiguration, Orkney Springs, VA	E. Mark Stevenson (2022) Assistant bishop Gayle E. Harris (2023) Assistant Bishop Mark A. Bourlakas (2025)
Diocese of Washington	1895	Washington, D.C., and nearby counties of Maryland	Washington National Cathedral,Washington, D.C.	Mariann E. Budde (2011)
Diocese of West Virginia	1877	West Virginia	none	Matthew Davis Cowden (2022)

== References and external links ==
- ECUSA Province Directory (2010 archived version)
- Province III website

Specific
