= Nathan D. Baxter =

American bishop (born 1948)

The Right Reverend Nathan Dwight Baxter AHC, D.Min., D.H.L., D.D., S.T.D.
- Bishop of Central Pennsylvania
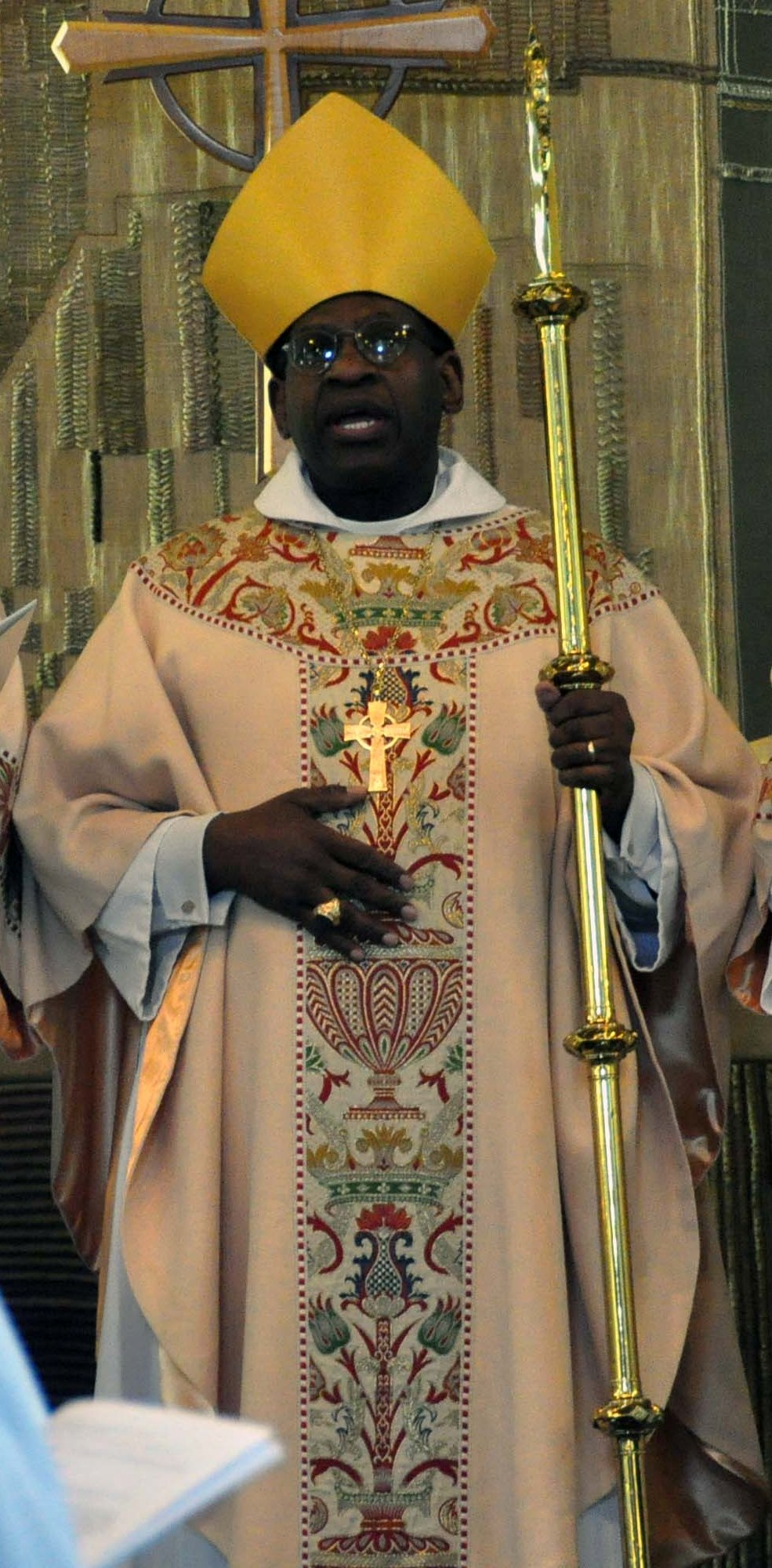
- Baxter in October 2009
- Church: Episcopal Church
- Diocese: Central Pennsylvania
- Elected: July 22, 2006
- In office: 2006–2014
- Predecessor: Michael W. Creighton
- Successor: Audrey Scanlan

Orders
- Ordination: December 16, 1977 by Dean T. Stevenson
- Consecration: October 22, 2006 by Frank Griswold

Personal details
- Born: November 16, 1948 (age 77) Harrisburg, Pennsylvania, United States
- Denomination: Anglican
- Parents: Elder Belgium Nathan Baxter & Augusta Ruth Byrd
- Spouse: Mary Ellen Walker
- Children: 2

Nathan Dwight Baxter AHC (born November 16, 1948) is the 10th bishop of the Episcopal Diocese of Central Pennsylvania and the 1,010 in succession in the Episcopal Church. He was elected as bishop coadjutor on July 22, 2006, and consecrated on October 22, 2006. Baxter's friend Archbishop Desmond Tutu preached the sermon.

== Early life ==
Baxter, a Harrisburg native, was the oldest of three sons, Charles Wayne and Larry of Elder Belgium N. Baxter and Augusta Baxter. He is married to Mary Ellen Baxter (Walker), an educator with degrees from Hampton University and Harvard University. They have two children, two foster children, and nine grandchildren.

== Education ==
He graduated from Lancaster Theological Seminary in 1976 with honors and prizes in homiletics and Christology and earned a Doctor of Ministry there in 1985. Baxter has also completed programs at the Graduate Theological Union in Berkeley, California, the Harvard Graduate School of Education, and the Warren Deem Management Institute at the Columbia University Executive Center. Baxter has received numerous other honors from colleges, universities and seminaries including being named an honorary alumnus at the Episcopal Divinity School 1991, and receiving eight honorary doctorates Dickinson College, Messiah College, Colgate University, St. Paul's College, York College, Elizabethtown College, Ohio Dominican University, Lincoln University and the Presidential Medal from Millersville University.

== Career ==
Directly before being elected bishop, Baxter spent two-and-a-half years serving as the rector of St. James Episcopal Church in Lancaster, Pennsylvania. A third-generation priest, he was dean of Washington National Cathedral from 1991 to 2003 and served as Chief Administrative Officer of the Protestant Episcopal Cathedral Foundation. California Rep. Barbara Lee credits Baxter's sermon at the September 14, 2001 memorial following the September 11 attacks, during which he warned Americans not to "become the evil we deplore," with cementing her decision to vote no on the Authorization for Use of Military Force of 2001 (Lee was the only member of Congress to vote no). Before becoming dean of the cathedral, Baxter served as the administrative dean and associate professor of pastoral theology at Episcopal Divinity School in Cambridge, Massachusetts, seminary dean and associate professor of church and ministry at Lancaster Theological Seminary in Lancaster, Pennsylvania, and chaplain and professor of religious studies at St. Paul's College in Lawrenceville, Virginia. Baxter has also served at other parishes in Pennsylvania and Virginia.

Baxter is an associate of the Order of the Holy Cross, chaplain of the Most Venerable Order of St. John of Jerusalem. Other memberships include Sigma Pi Phi fraternity, the Cosmos Club of Washington, and a life member of the Union of Black Episcopalians and the NAACP. Drafted in 1968, he is also a decorated U.S. Army veteran of the Vietnam War, having received the Vietnam Cross of Gallantry with Palm and the Combat Medical Badge.

He was selected to deliver the prayer for the nation at the White House Millennium Celebration, which was televised internationally. He was acknowledged by Nancy Reagan for his leadership in planning the funeral of President Ronald Reagan.

== Retirement ==
Baxter retired in May 2014 after serving as Bishop of the Diocese of Central Pennsylvania for eight years. Following Baxter's retirement the Rt. Rev. Robert Gepert was named as provisional bishop of the diocese. On March 14, 2015, the Rev. Canon Audrey Scanlan was elected to become the next bishop of the diocese.

Episcopal Church (USA) titles
Preceded by John T. Walker	Dean of Washington National Cathedral; 1992–2003	Succeeded by Samuel T. Lloyd III
