= Charlie F. McNutt =

American bishop

The Right Reverend Charlie Fuller McNutt D.D.
- Bishop of Central Pennsylvania
- Church: Episcopal Church
- Diocese: Central Pennsylvania
- Elected: June 14, 1980
- In office: 1982–1995
- Predecessor: Dean T. Stevenson
- Successor: Michael W. Creighton
- Previous post: Coadjutor Bishop of Central Pennsylvania (1980-1982)

Orders
- Ordination: December 1956 by Wilburn C. Campbell
- Consecration: November 8, 1980 by John Allin

Personal details
- Born: February 27, 1931 Charleston, West Virginia, U.S.
- Died: October 25, 2023 (aged 92) Mechanicsburg, Pennsylvania, U.S.
- Denomination: Anglican
- Parents: Charlie Fuller McNutt & Mary Ford
- Spouse: Alice Turnbull (m. March 3, 1962)
- Children: 3

Charlie Fuller McNutt Jr. (February 27, 1931 – October 25, 2023) was an American bishop in The Episcopal Church who served as Bishop of Central Pennsylvania between 1982 and 1995.

== Biography ==
Charlie Fuller McNutt Jr. was born in Charleston, West Virginia on February 27, 1931, the son of Charlie Fuller McNutt and Mary Ford. He graduated with a B.A. from Washington and Lee University and later with a Bachelor of Divinity from Virginia Theological Seminary. He also graduated with a master's degree in urban and regional planning from Florida State University. He was ordained to the priesthood in 1956. He served churches in Tallahassee, Florida and Jacksonville, Florida. In 1974 he became rector of Trinity Church in Martinsburg, West Virginia. He was also a diocesan canon in the Diocese of Florida.

On June 14, 1980, McNutt was elected Coadjutor Bishop of Central Pennsylvania after the fourth ballot, during a convention held at Bucknell University. He was consecrated on November 8, 1980 by Presiding Bishop John Allin at the Scottish Rite Cathedral in Harrisburg, Pennsylvania. He succeeded as diocesan bishop on June 12, 1982 during a service in the Rooke Chapel of Bucknell University. The service was presided over by the Presiding Bishop, John Allin. He retired in 1995.

McNutt married Alice Turnbull and they had three children: Thomas, Charlie, and Alison. He died on October 25, 2023, at the age of 92.
