= Mark Dyer =

American Episcopal bishop (1930–2014)

The Right Reverend James Michael Mark Dyer M.Th., S.T.L., D.D.
- Bishop of Bethlehem
- Church: Episcopal Church
- Diocese: Bethlehem
- Elected: June 26, 1982
- In office: 1983–1995
- Predecessor: Lloyd E. Gressle
- Successor: Paul V. Marshall
- Previous post: Coadjutor Bishop of Bethlehem (1982-1983)

Orders
- Ordination: August 25, 1963
- Consecration: November 6, 1982 by John Allin

Personal details
- Born: June 7, 1930 Manchester, New Hampshire, United States
- Denomination: Anglican (prev. Roman Catholic)
- Parents: James M. Dyer & Anna Mahoney
- Spouse: Marie Elizabeth Dyer (1971-1999); Amelia J. Gearey (2004-2014)
- Children: 3

James Michael Mark Dyer (June 7, 1930 – November 11, 2014) was bishop of the Episcopal Diocese of Bethlehem from 1982 to 1995.

== Early life ==
Dyer was born on June 7, 1930, in Manchester, New Hampshire, the son of James M. Dyer and Anna Mahoney, both of Irish descent. He was baptised as a Roman Catholic in the Church of St Anne in Manchester, New Hampshire, on June 21, 1930. He was educated at St Joseph's Cathedral High School and graduated in 1948. During the Korean War, he served in the US Navy. He was discharged on November 18, 1954, and studied at the American College of the University of Louvain in Belgium, where he studied contemporary philosophy between 1957 and 1959. Once returning to Manchester, he completed his studies at Saint Anselm College and graduated magna cum laude with a Bachelor of Arts in June 1959.

== Religious life ==
Dyer joined the Benedictines at Saint Anselm Abbey in Goffstown, New Hampshire, and took his vows on July 11, 1960, and his name was changed to Mark. He was eventually ordained a priest on August 25, 1963. He graduated with a Master of Theology and a Licentiate of Sacred Theology from the University of Ottawa in 1965. He was also professor of Systematic and Ascetical Theology at St Anselm Abbey Seminary between 1965 and 1969 and professor of Systematic Theology at Queen of Peace Mission Seminary between 1968 and 1969.

== Conversion to Anglicanism and Ministry ==
He remained as a member of the order and of the Roman Catholic Church till 1969, when he joined the Anglican Church of Canada at St Matthew's Church in Ottawa in September 1969. On April 17, 1971, he married Marie Elizabeth Hamlin, a former nun of the Anglican Order of St Anne. Eventually they adopted and raised three children. In 1971, Dyer was invited by Bishop John Burgess of Massachusetts to serve as a missioner to the clergy of his diocese and on June 15, 1971, he was received as an Episcopal priest. In 1976 he became priest-in-charge of Trinity Church in Bridgewater, Massachusetts, at a time when most of the congregation had voted to leave the Episcopal Church. In 1978, he became rector of Christ Church Hamilton and Wenham in South Hamilton, Massachusetts. He was also a supplementary professor of Patristic and Medieval Theology at Gordon-Conwell Theological Seminary in Massachusetts. In 1975 he was a nominee for the bishopric of Massachusetts after Bishop Burgess' retirement; however, he was not elected.

== Bishop of Bethlehem ==
On June 26, 1982, Dyer was elected Coadjutor Bishop of Bethlehem during a special convention which took place in the Cathedral of the Nativity. He was elected on the third ballot from a list of five candidates. He was consecrated on November 6, 1982, in the Packer Memorial Chapel by Presiding Bishop John Allin. By this time his wife was also ordained as an Episcopal priest, who also read the litany during his consecration. He succeeded as diocesan bishop in December 1983. During his tenure in Bethlehem he addressed divisions concerning the ordination of women and same-sex marriage. He was also an advocate for dialogues between the Episcopal Church and Lutheran and Orthodox churches in the United States. Following retirement in 1995, Dyer served as professor of theology and director of spiritual formation at Virginia Theological Seminary in Alexandria, Virginia. He died in Alexandria of multiple myeloma in 2014. Since the 1970s and continuing to the 2020s, the Episcopal Diocese of Bethlehem has been a significant epicenter of local underage sexual abuse and clergy complaints in both the Episcopal Church and the Roman Catholic Church. Dyer apologized to dozens of abuse victims publicly during his tenure, as covered extensively in local newspapers and television news media.

== Bibliography ==
- "Prayer and the Priesthood", Bulletin of the General Theological Seminary of New York, Vol. LX, Number 3 (June, 1974).
- "Principles of Spiritual Direction", Office of Pastoral Development (private printing, April, 1974).
- "Some Religious Aspects of Support Systems", in Supporting Systems and Mutual Help: Multidisciplinary Explorations, ed. By Gerald Caplan, M.D., Department of Psychiatry, Harvard Medical School, New York: Grime and Stratton, Inc., 1976.
- "Going Forth, Reflections on the Christian Life, Bible Reading Fellowship", Winter Park, Florida, Volume 12, Number 3, 1983.
- "Theological Reflection on the Patristic Development of Episcopal Ministry" in On Being a Bishop, ed. J. Robert Wright, Church Hymnal Corporation, New York, 1992.
- "Revelation – Covenant-Torah", House of Bishops Publication ECUSA, 1993.
- "Your Spirituality Matters", Episcopal Life (monthly column), 1993.
- Doing Theology in a Covenant Community, Forward Movement, Cincinnati, Ohio, 1994.
- "The Historic Episcopate in the Context of Apostolic Succession" in Discovering Common Mission, ed. R.B. Slocum, Don Armentrout. CPI, New York, 2003.

Anglican Communion titles
Preceded by Lloyd E. Gressle	Bishop of Bethlehem; 1986–1995	Succeeded by Paul V. Marshall
