= Cathedral Church of the Nativity =

Historic church in Pennsylvania, United States

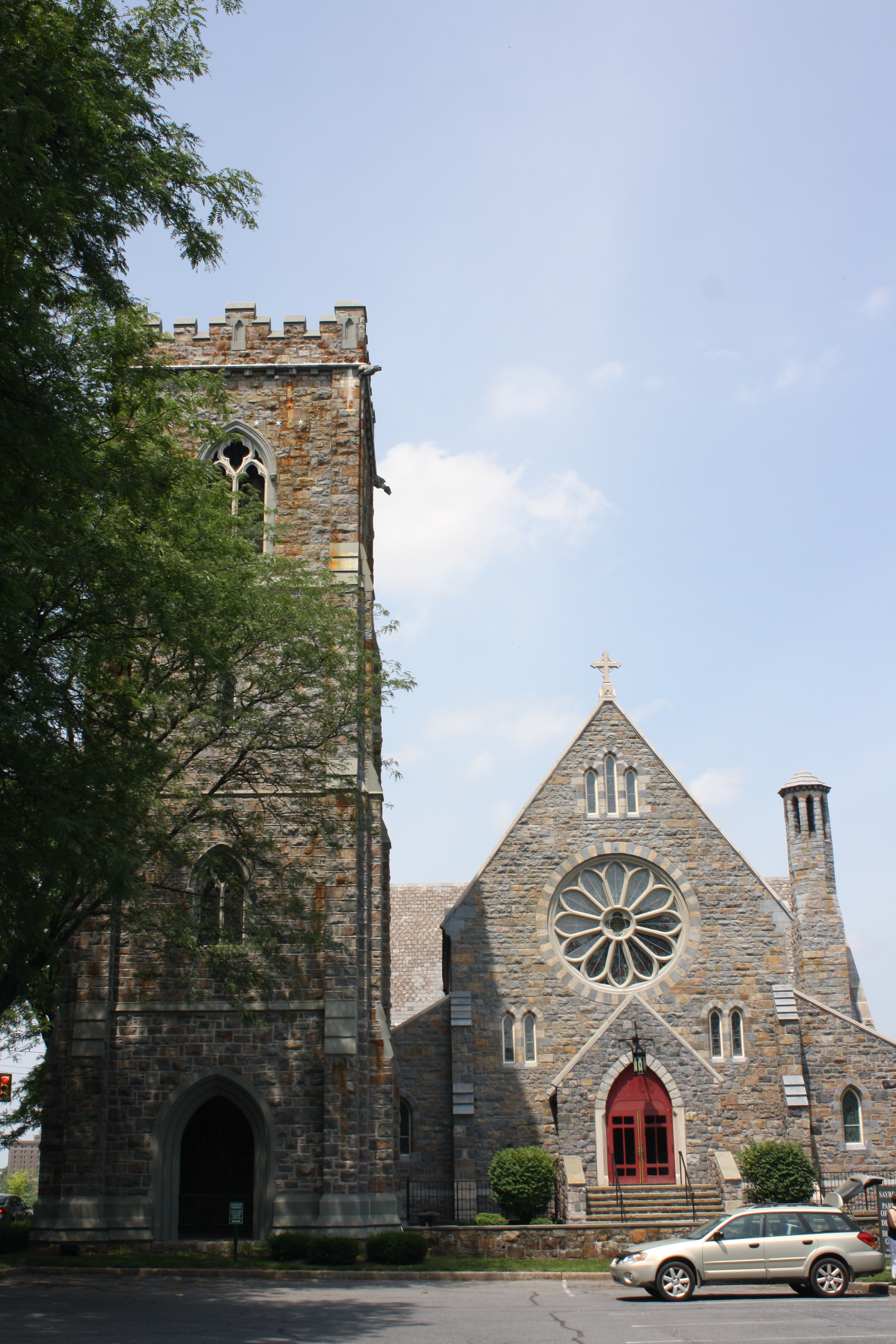
- Cathedral Church of the Nativity
- Location: 321 Wyandotte St. Bethlehem, Pennsylvania
- Country: United States
- Denomination: Episcopal Church in the United States of America
- Website: www.nativitycathedral.org

History
- Former name(s): 1865, Church of the Nativity; 1900, Pro-Cathedral Church of the Nativity; 1944, Cathedral Church of the Nativity
- Founded: November 8, 1862
- Founder: William Heysham Sayre
- Consecrated: April 19, 1865 & November 1, 1888

Architecture
- Architect(s): E.T. Potter (1865 building, current transepts); E.M. Burns (1887 nave & apse)
- Architectural type: English Gothic Revival
- Style: Gothic Revival
- Completed: 1864, 1887

Administration
- Diocese: Susquehanna

Clergy
- Bishop: Audrey Scanlan
- Dean: Jon Stratton
- Nativity Episcopal Cathedral
- U.S. Historic district – Contributing property
- Location within Pennsylvania Location within the United States
- Coordinates: 40°36′41.12″N 75°23′01″W
- Part of: Fountain Hill Historic District (ID88000450)
- Added to NRHP: April 21, 1988

The Cathedral Church of the Nativity is an Episcopal cathedral in Bethlehem, Pennsylvania. It was the seat of the former Diocese of Bethlehem, and is now a co-cathedral of the Diocese of the Susquehanna, formed in 2026 from a reunion between the Diocese of Bethlehem and the Diocese of Central Pennsylvania. In 1988 it was listed as a contributing property in the Fountain Hill Historic District on the National Register of Historic Places.

== History ==
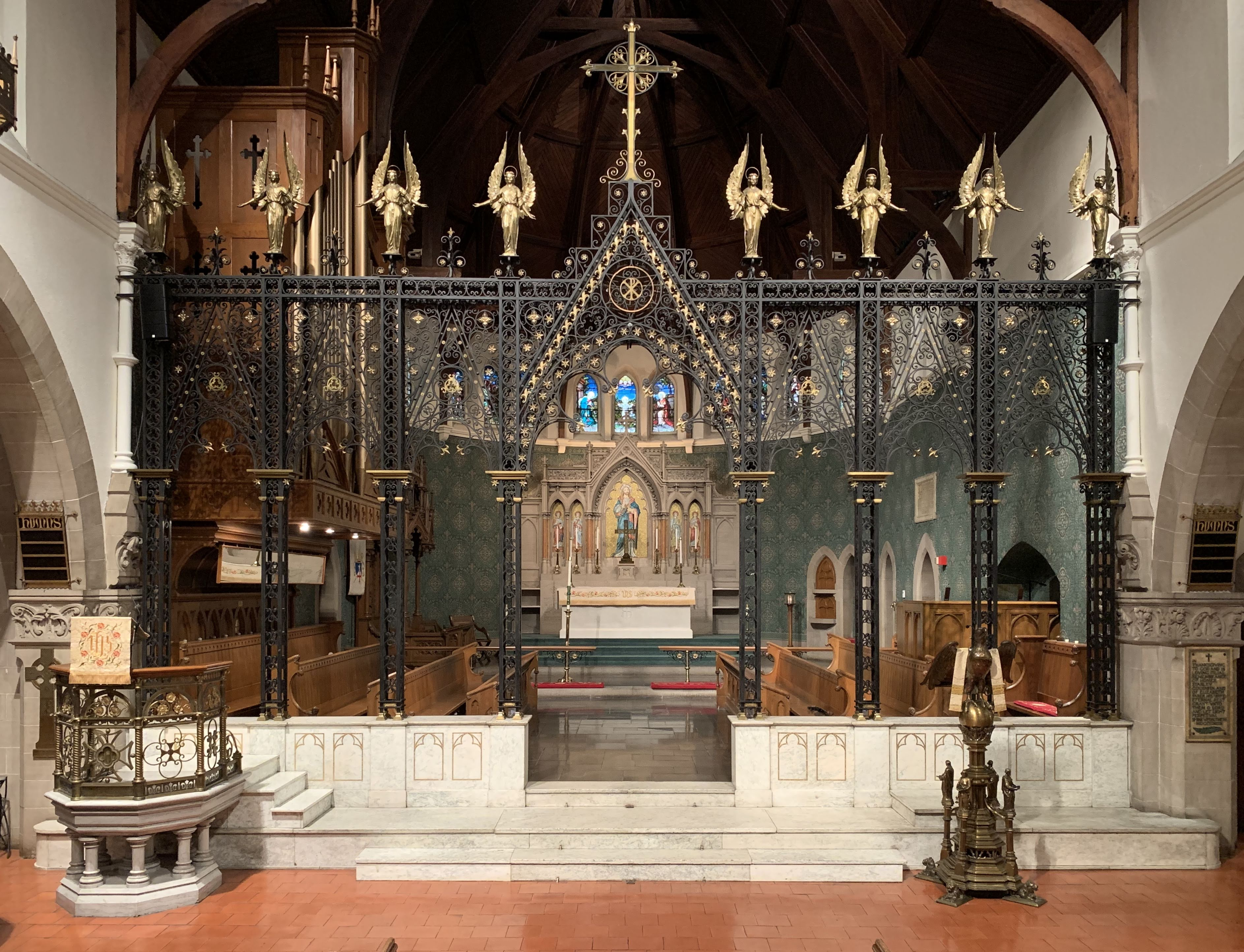
The church's interior in 2020

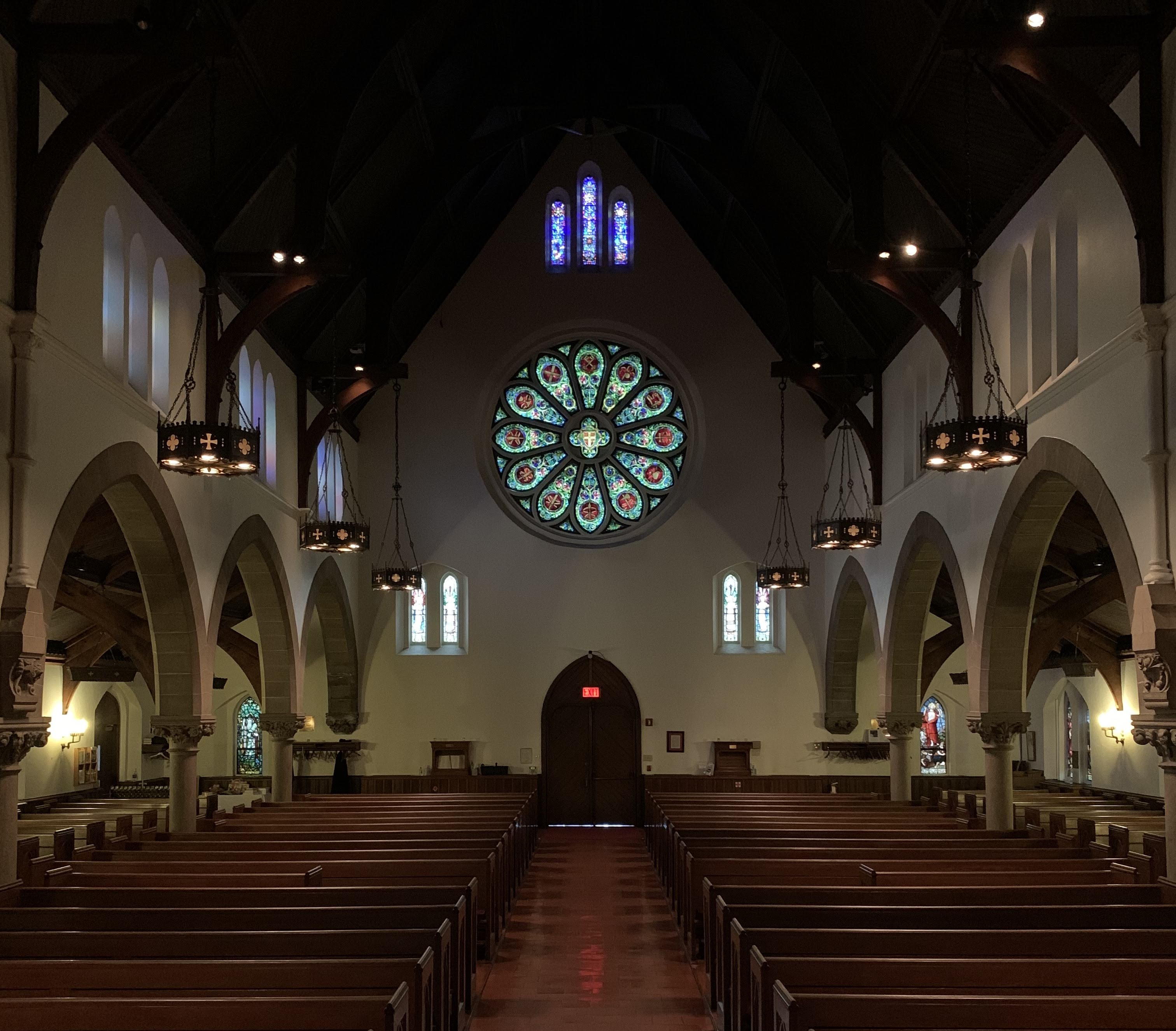
The church's interior in 2020

=== Founding of the parish ===
The first services of the Episcopal Church were occasionally celebrated in Bethlehem beginning in 1854, in locations such as Temperance Hall near Broad and New streets, the Sun Inn, the Eagle Hotel, Central Moravian Church, and Citizens' Hall. In the early 1860s, Tinsley Jeter led worship in his home, the old Freytag farmhouse. The first Episcopal service officiated by a cleric in South Bethlehem was held in Robert Sayre's parlor on June 16, 1861, by the Rev. Mr. Tschudi, assistant minister of St. Mark's, Mauch Chunk (Jim Thorpe). A church school of 52 pupils was soon established in the North Pennsylvania Railroad station on May 11, 1862. In July 1862, the Missionary Society of the Diocese of Pennsylvania sent the Rev. Eliphalet Nott Potter (son of Bishop Alonzo Potter), as missionary to Bethlehem and Allentown. From September 7, 1862, services have been held regularly, with Holy Communion being celebrated for the first time in South Bethlehem on October 19, 1962, with the Rev. Alexander Cummins, rector of Christ Church, Reading, presiding. At a meeting in the home of Robert Sayre on November 8, 1862, a temporary vestry formed. William Heysham Sayre and Tinsley Jeter were wardens. Ira Cortright, Robert Sayre, William Sayre Jr., and John Smylie Jr. were members. At the convention of the Diocese of Pennsylvania of May 1863, the parish was received into the diocese, and on June 1, 1863, the Rev. Eliphalet Potter was called as rector. Asa Packer and Solomon Roberts joined the vestry.

=== Pro-cathedral and cathedral ===
The vestry voted to allow the church to allow the use of the church by Bishop Rulison, an assistant bishop, in 1890 (but as assistant bishops do not officially have a see the church did not officially become the pro-cathedral until 1899 under the Rt. Rev. Ethelbert Talbot, and then, in 1944, under the Rt. Rev. Frank W. Sterrett it became the cathedral of the Episcopal Diocese of Bethlehem.

=== Congregations planted ===
==== Trinity Church ====
In 1869 under the guidance of then rector the Rev. Robert Nevin, a Sunday school was established on Wall Street (currently Market Street) to provide an Episcopal presence on across the river on Bethlehem's NorthSide. When Nevin left Nativity, acting rector the Rev. John Forbes took over the effort and H. Stanley Goodwin became the first superintendent. It was during this time that the name Trinity was chosen. By 1872 the first vestry established itself with members of the Church of the Nativity's vestry also serving on Trinity Church's: Charles Dodson, William Dunglison, H. Stanley Goodwin, and Robert H. Sayre. Trinity Church's first services were held in 1872, and by 1873 was accepted in union with the then Diocese of Central Pennsylvania.

==== St. Mary's Chapel ====
With the establishment of John Smylie's Shive Governor Works and the construction of the Lechauweki Springs Summer Resort in Fountain Hill in 1873, the Church of the Nativity planted a Sunday school which met at the resort. Robert H. Sayre was the first superintendent. By 1874 it had grown and began meeting in Salisbury Public School. Property at the corner of Lechauweki Avenue and Church Street in Fountain Hill was purchased, a cornerstone was laid on October 6, 1874, and St. Mary's Chapel was consecrated on the 10th anniversary of the Church of the Nativity, April 19, 1875. By 1895, the building had been enlarged and reconsecrated.

Due to the advent of the automobile and changing demographics, by 1942 the last services were held in St. Mary's Chapel and the property and building were sold by the Cathedral Church of the Nativity in 1945.

The building is currently home to Healthy Environments Child Development Center.

==== St. Joseph Chapel ====
An influx of workers to the iron works in South Bethlehem inspired members of the Church of the Nativity to plant a Sunday school near the No. 3 Furnace. Thus, in November 1882, St. Joseph's Chapel began under the direction of William Wharton Thurston who was then president of the iron works. In 1883 property for an edifice was purchased by Joseph Wharton of Philadelphia, ground was broken on November 6, 1883, and the cornerstone was laid on November 18. In January 1884 the first services were held in the new building, and on October 18, 1884, the building was consecrated.

By 1897 the congregation had grown enough to need more space, and the building was enlarged. This larger building was consecrated in Sept 1899. By 1911, demographics were changing in the neighborhood, and St. Joseph's was given by the diocesan Italian missioner, the Rev. D. A. Rocca for ministry to Italian immigrants. By 1914 an influx of immigrants from Greece meant that the beginning of the congregation that would become St. Nicholas Greek Orthodox Church started using the building, and in 1917 The [Episcopal] Pro-Cathedral Church of the Nativity sold the property to St. Nicholas Greek Orthodox congregation.

The building is currently home to Holy Bethel Pentecostal Church.

The cemetery behind St. Joseph's building remains partially owned by St. Nicholas Greek Orthodox Church, and partially by the [Episcopal] Cathedral Church of the Nativity.

=== Connections to Foundation of Local Institutions ===
==== Lehigh University ====
1865

==== Bishopthorpe School for Girls ====
When Philadelphia music publisher Charles Augustus Fiot died in 1866, the Manor House mansion and grounds he had built in the early 1850s on the old Hoffert farm and called "Fontainebleau" in Fountain Hill came up for sale. Tinsely Jeter scooped up the property in 1867. In a meeting at Robert H. Sayre's mansion on December 11, 1867, Robert Sayre, William H. Sayre, Tinsley Jeter, H. Stanley Goodwin, James Jenkins, John Smylie, Henry Coppee, the Rev. Eliphalet N. Potter (Rector of The Church of the Nativity) and the Rt. Rev. William Bacon Stevens (Bishop of the Diocese of Pennsylvania) committed themselves to establishing a "young ladies' academy of the highest character". By 1868 the Bishopthorpe School for Girls had begun, with the property rented, and then purchased by the Vestry of The Church of the Nativity. It utilized the old Manor House as a seminary (i.e. finishing school) for girls born to the wealthy families of the burgeoning industrial class. Tinsley Jeter was the first President of the Board and the school operated under the auspices of the Episcopal Diocese of Pennsylvania. Edith H. Chase was hired as first principal and held the post until 1870. By the 1880s the Diocese of Pennsylvania had purchased the school. Fanny I. Walsh succeeded her and was principal until her death in 1894. By 1902 the school had fallen on hard times and closed temporarily, until it was purchased by Claude I. Wyant in 1906.

During the Great Depression, the Wyants closed the school and sold Bishopthorpe to St. Luke's Hospital in 1930, where in 1931 St. Luke's opened its School of Nursing. The buildings were demolished in 1994.

==== St. Luke's Hospital ====
1871

==== The Children's Home of South Bethlehem / Wiley House / KidsPeace ====
1882

==== Leonard Hall ====
1907

==== Saucon Valley Country Club ====
1920

==== New Bethany Ministries ====
1985

==== Bethlehem Emergency Sheltering ====
2009

== Buildings ==
=== Church ===
==== First Building 1864 ====
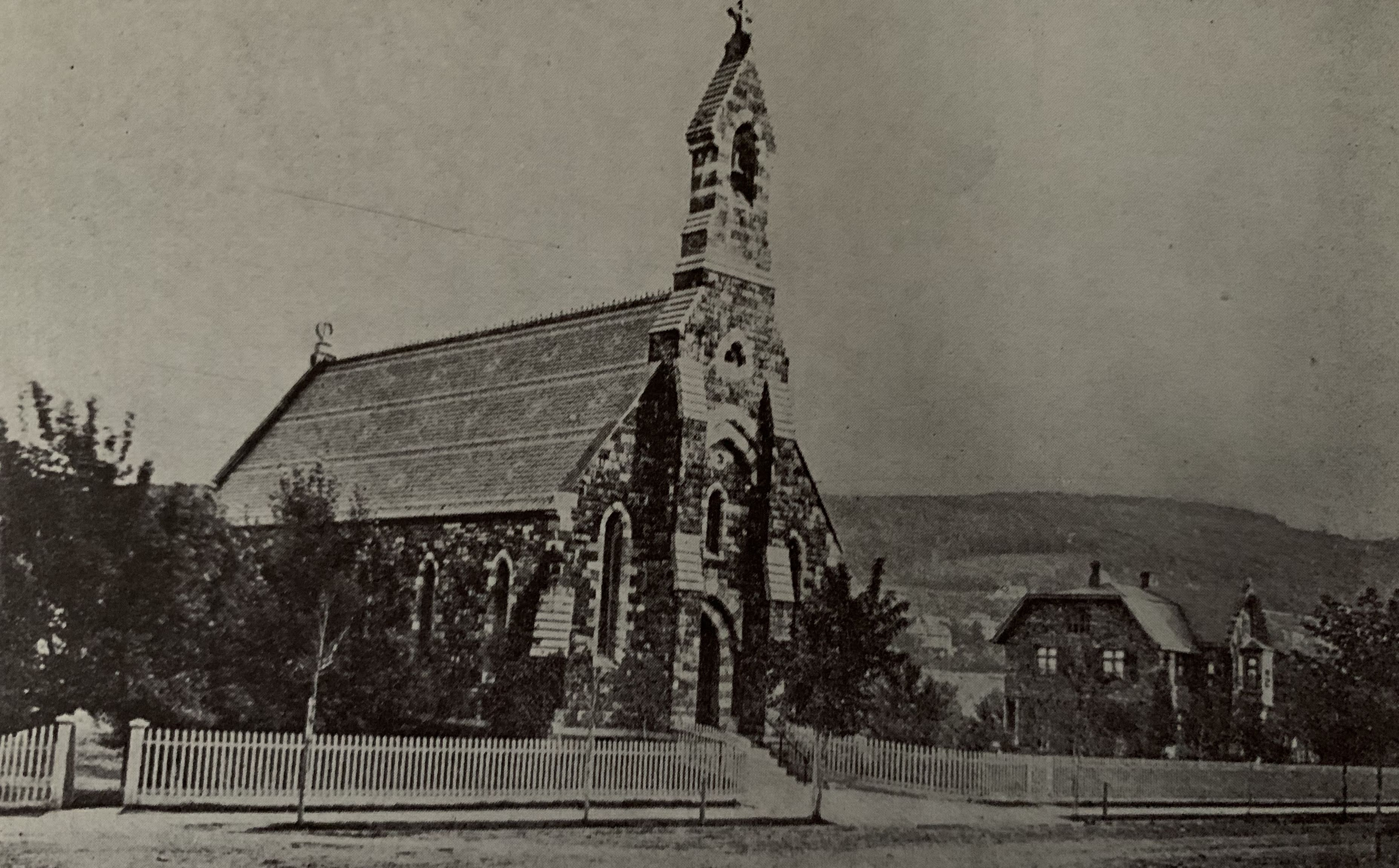
The Church of the Nativity, c. 1866

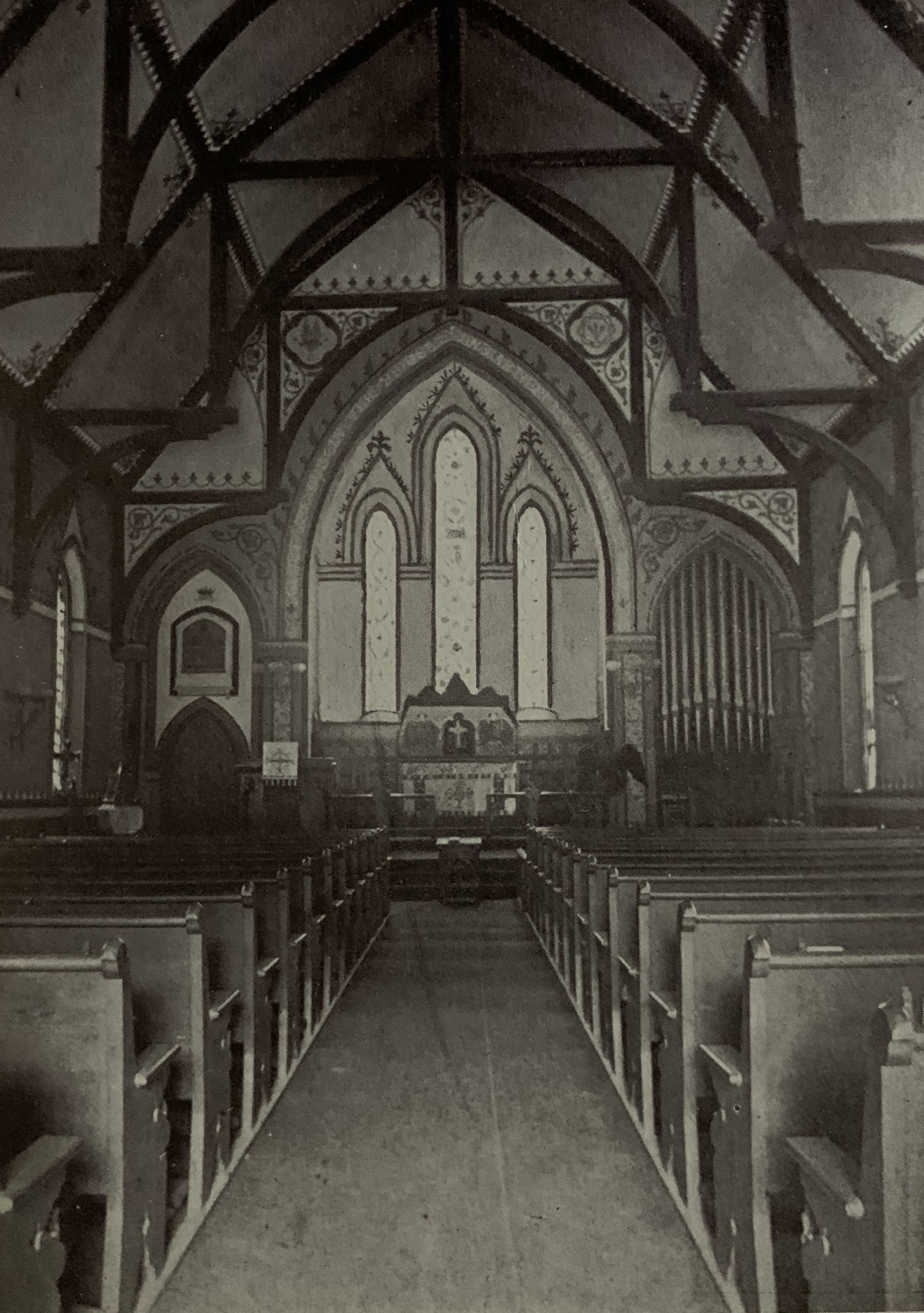
Interior, c. 1866

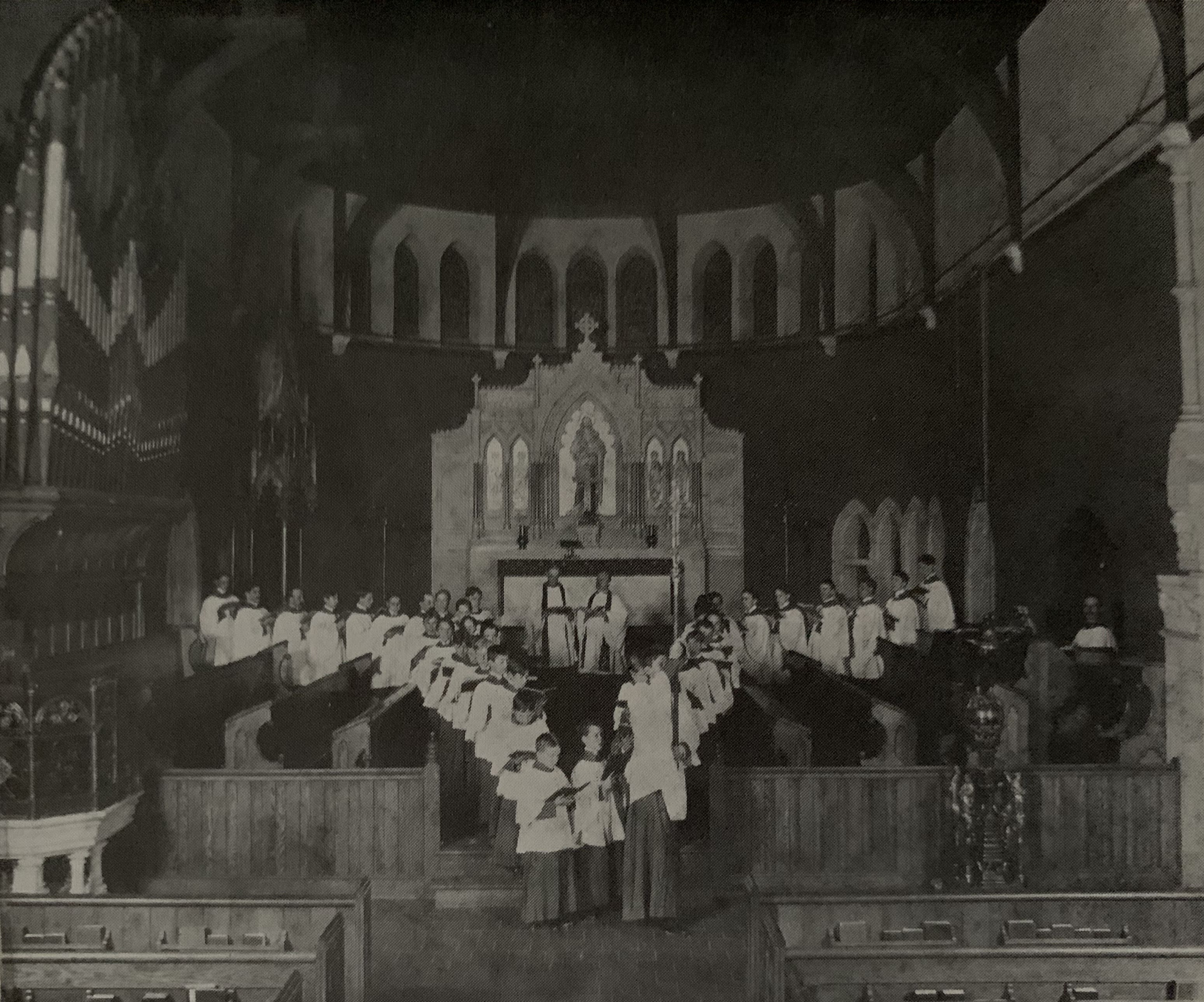
Choir, chancel, and Altar in the late 1890s

New York architect Edward Tuckerman Potter designed the first church building in and English Gothic Revival style. And so, on August 3, 1863 the cornerstone was laid, and construction began on the parish's first church building. It was completed the following year with the first services celebrated on Christmas Day, and was consecrated on April 19, 1865 by the Rt. Rev. William B. Stevens, then Assistant Bishop of Pennsylvania.

==== Enlargement 1887 ====
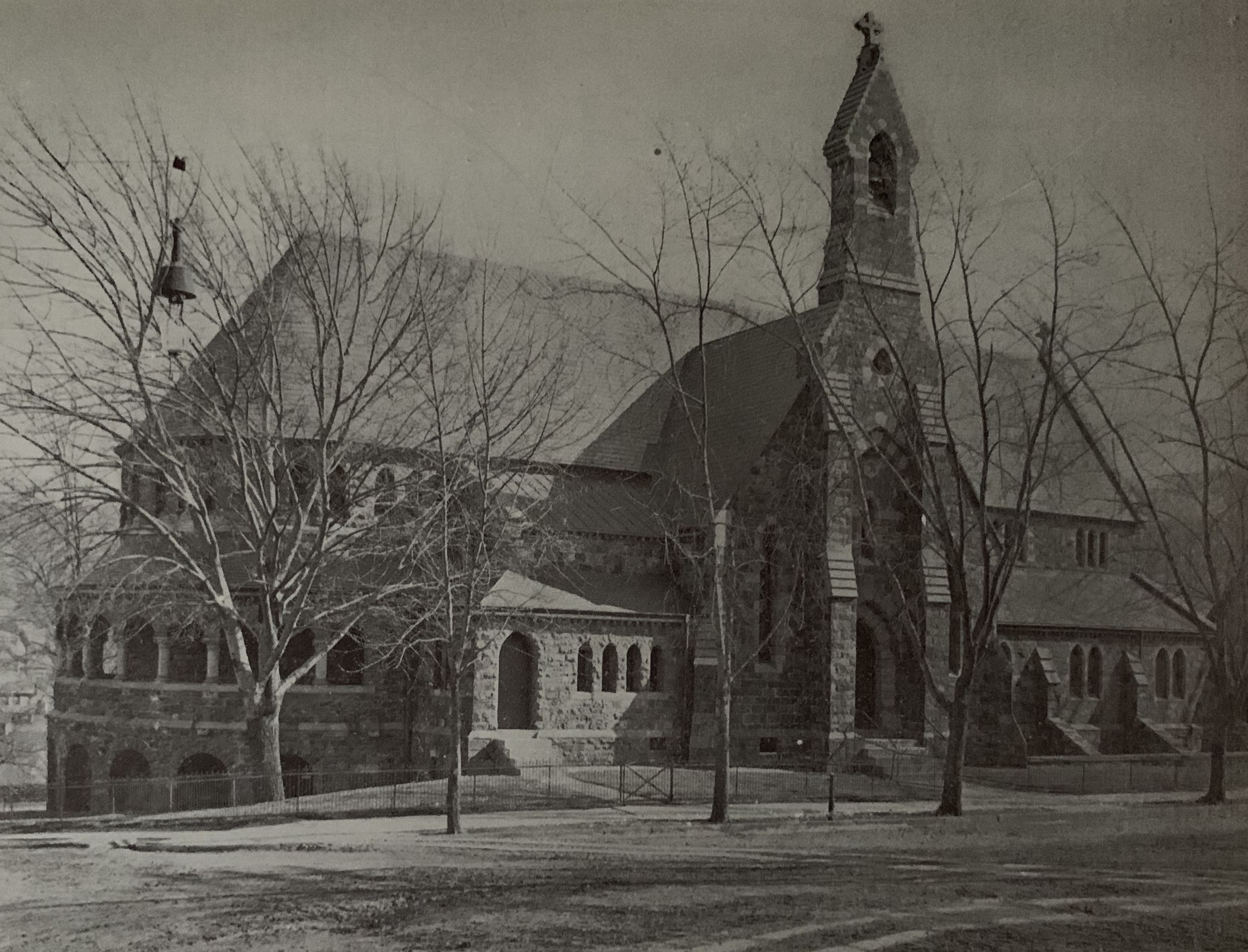
Apse and Nave, c. 1888

The present building's nave, chancel and iconic apse were designed by architect E. M. Burns and incorporated the 1864 building as an east-west transept. Robert Packer Linderman, together with his sister Sally, and brother Garrett Brodhead Linderman Jr erected the chancel in memory of their father Dr. Garrett Brodhead Linderman, and the Altar and reredos in memory of their mother Lucy Packer Linderman, daughter of Asa Packer.

Construction was completed in 1887 and the enlarged building was first used on Easter Day, April 10, 1887. The debt was paid off by the following year and it was consecrated by Assistant Bishop of Central Pennsylvania, the Rt. Rev. Nelson Somerville Rulison on All Saints' Day, November 1, 1888.

==== Tower, Baptistery & Rood Screen 1899 ====
In 1899 Robert Packer Linderman gave the iconic Rood Screen, designed by J. & R. Lamb Studios as a thank offering for the recent birth of his son Robert Packer Linderman Jr. In the same year, Robert Heysham Sayre installed the Font and Baptistery designed by E. M. Burns in memory of his first wife Mary Evelyn Sayre, four of their children who died young (Charles White, Anna Catharine, Ellen May, and Francis Rodolphus), a grandchild who died, Robert Sayre Chandler; his sister Elizabeth Kent (wife of William Reed), and their deceased grandchildren Harvey Dennison Kitchel, Gladys Kitchel, and William Sayre Kitchel; his sister Catharine Irvin; and his deceased son Cecil Nevin Sayre (from his second marriage to Martha Nevin). Warren Abbot Wilbur built the tower with its bells on the southwest corner of the building in 1899, in memory of his late wife Sallie Packer Linderman Wilbur. The set of nine bells, made by the Meneely (Troy) Bell Foundry were first rung on Easter Day, April 15, 1900.

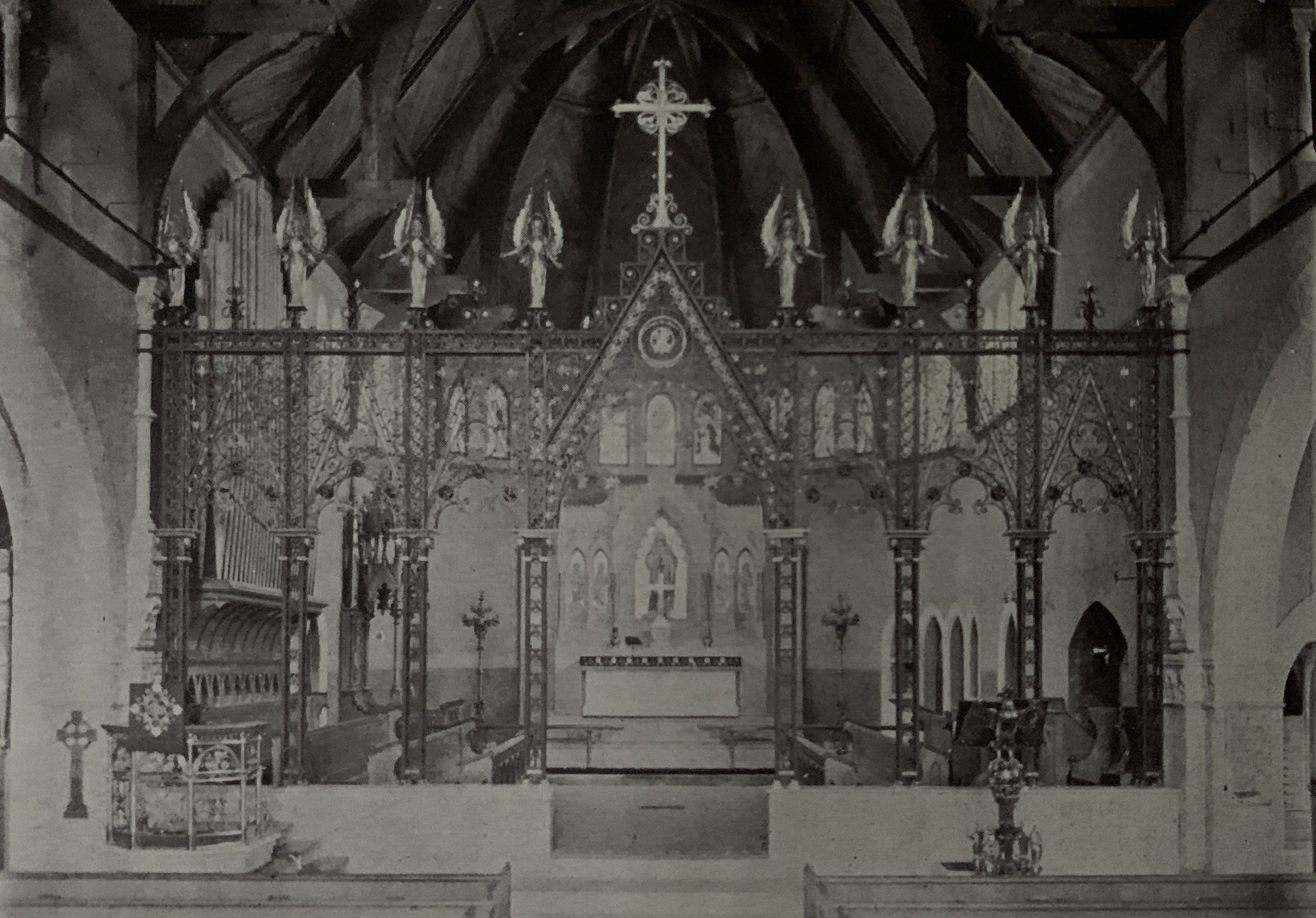
Rood Screen, Chancel, and Altar, 1900

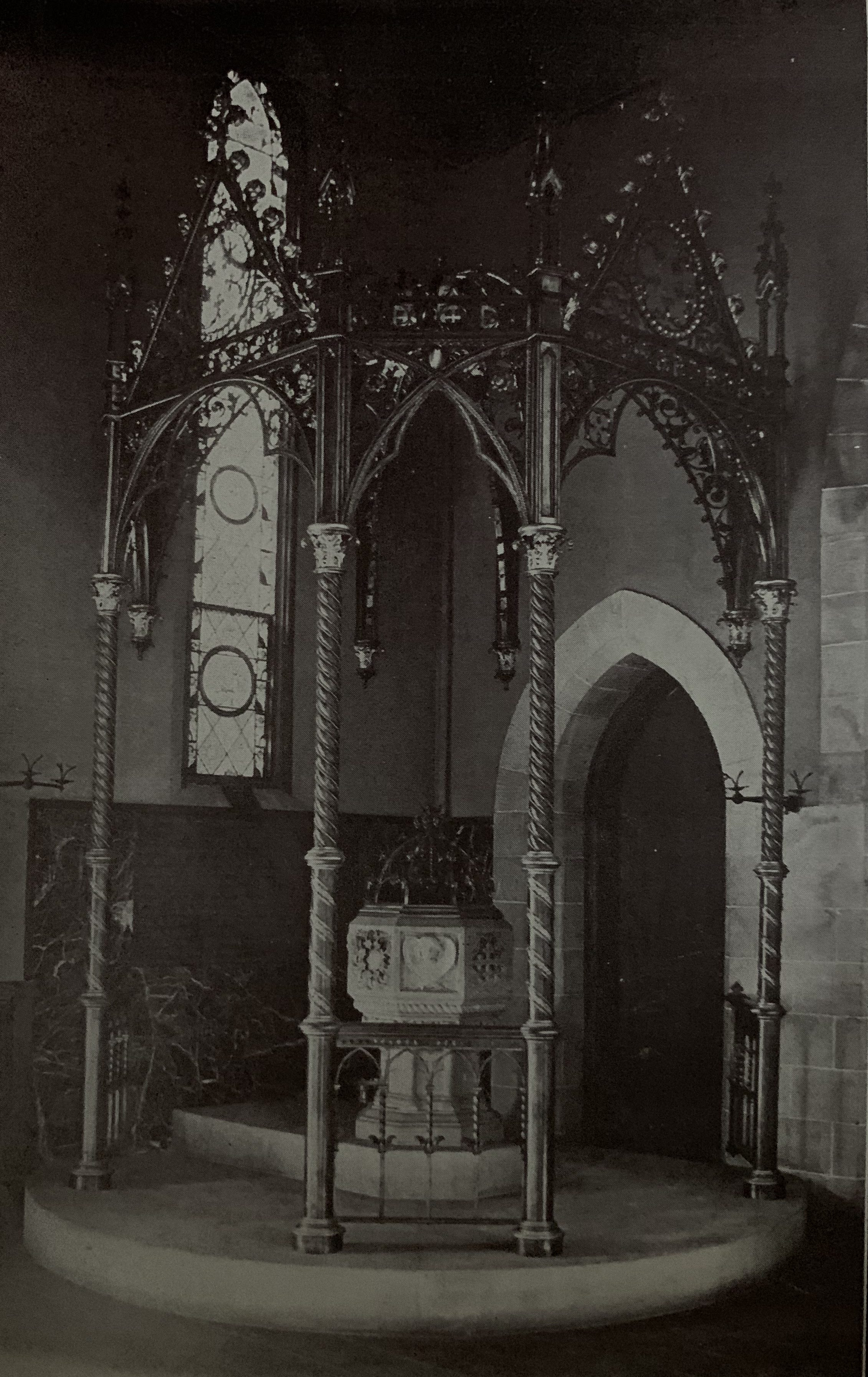
Baptistery, 1900

==== Pipe Organs ====
- 1865 C. F. Durner?
- 1887 Johnson & Son, Op. 672 given by Elisha Packer Wilbur Sr.
- 1940 Aeolian-Skinner, Op. 1003 (39 ranks)
- 1998 Austin Organs, Inc., Op. 2776 (47 ranks)

=== The Parish House ===
1897 then 1939

=== The Deanery ===
In 1866, a year after completion of the 1865 church building, at the request of the Rector the Rev. Eliphalet Potter, the Vestry authorized construction of a rectory for $1500. The building, built of stone in a Rural Gothic [Revival] style was completed by 1867.

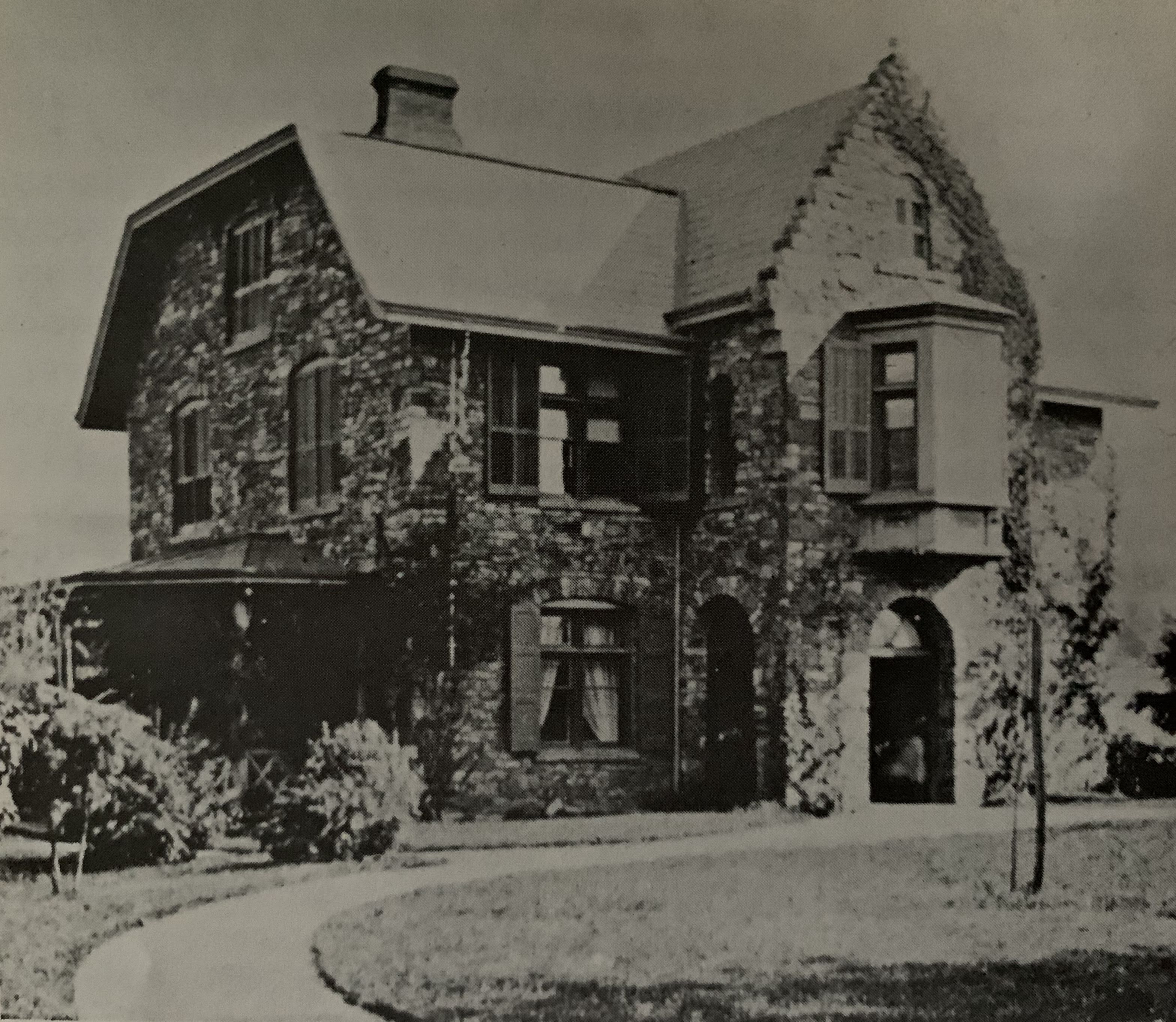
Rectory, c. 1866

From 1866 until 1938 the house served as the Rector's, then Dean's house. Under Dean Foust, then, the parish rented then purchased a home on Seneca Street in Fountain to be a Rectory. Parish offices moved into the first floor of the former Rectory - then restyled "Church House" - and the second and third floors were converted into an apartment for associate clergy. The Seneca Street Deanery was sold in 1955 and a house on West Market Street was purchased as the Deanery. The Parish Offices moved from Church House back to the Parish House (Sayre Hall) in 1986. For a time in the 1970s and 1980s and then again in the 2000s the second and third floor apartment housed the Sexton. KidsPeace and then a counseling center utilized the space in the late 1990s.

Currently the first floor of the Deanery is home to ShareCare Faith-in-Action, the Cathedral History Room (archives), and the Sexton's Office. The second and third floor apartment is clergy housing.

== Rectors and Deans ==
- Eliphalet Nott Potter, Rector, 1862 to 1869
- Robert Jenkins Nevin, Rector, 1869
- Cortland Whitehead, Rector, 1870 to 1882
- Cleland Kinlock Nelson, Rector, 1882 to 1892
- Gilbert Henry Sterling, Rector, 1892 to 1912
- Frederick W. Beekman, Dean & Rector, 1913 to 1917
- John Insley Blair Larned, Dean & Rector, 1918 to 1922
- D. Wilmot Gateson, Dean & Rector, 1922 to 1931
- Walter H. Gray, Dean & Rector, 1932 to 1936
- Roscoe T. Foust, Dean & Rector, 1937 to 1945
- W. Robert Webb, Dean & Rector, 1945 to 1954
- Benjamin Minifie, Dean & Rector, 1955 to 1960
- John N. McCormick, Dean & Rector, 1960 to 1966
- H. Lawrence Wittemore, Dean & Rector, 1967 to 1983
- Robert Downes Schenkel, Dean & Rector
- William Lane, Dean & Rector
- Anthony R. Pompa, Dean & Rector, 2007 to 2023
- Jon Stratton, Dean & Rector, 2023 to Present.

== Associate Clergy ==
- Enoch Supplee, 1866
- Henry H. Oberly, 1867
- Robert H. Nevin, 1868
- Charles H. Mead, 1871–72
- Charles Edgar Taylor, 1886–88
- Harvey S. Fisher, 1890–91
- George W. van Fossen, 1893
- Willis H. Stone, 1894–96
- Stewart U. Mitman, 1896-1913
- Brayton Byron, 1913–16
- Wolcott Cutler, 1916–18
- Arthur Murray, 1918-192?
- Steward F. Custard Jr., 1923–24
- Kenneth Bray, 1929–32
- Kenneth E. Heim, 1932–35
- Edward Carroll Morgan, 1935–36
- Eugene Schmaus, 1936–37
- G. Clayton Melling, 1937–39
- Charles Robison Allen, 1937–41
- Dean Theodore Stevenson, 1940–42
- Theodore “Ted” Titus Johnson, 1942–43
- W. Robert Webb, 1944–45
- Herbert H. Griffin, 1945–49
- Bruce Armfield Weatherly, 1950–52
- Peter B. Goodfellow, 1953–55
- J. Robert Zimmerman, 1956–58
- Frederick T. Bender, 1958–60
- Peter H. Igarashi, 1960–64
- H. Dwight Blakeslee, 1964–68
- G. Richard Lobs, 1968–70
- Charles Edward “Ned” South, 1970–71
- Theodore L. Weatherly, 1968–74
- John D. Crandall, 1975–79
- A. Donald Feyrer, 1976–83
- Robert L. Tate, 1980–84
- Maurice “Reese” Lane Friedman, 1985–86
- Gary G. Nicholosi, 1986–90
- Gwendolyn Jane Romeril, 1982–88
- Ira C. Houck III, 1991–92
- Anthony R. Pompa, 1991-
- Joel Atkinson, 1998
- Anne Kitch, 1999-2007
- Mariclair Partee, 2012-
- Kimberly Rowles Reinholz 2013-2015
- Michelle Moyer, 2015–18
- Dale Grandfield, 2019–2022
- Maryann Philbrook - Sturgess 2022–Present

== Organist/Choirmasters ==
- John Romig 1865 - 1867
- A. Spengler 1865 - 1869
- J. P. Pennington 1869 - 1873
- W. L. Church 1873 - 1876
- Annie E. Stein 1876 - 1880
- Mrs. E. Wilson 1880 - 1884
- Mrs. Wells 1884 - 1886
- S. S. Gilbert 1886 - 1887
- James E. Dale 1887 - 1888
- Charles F. Wilson 1888 - 1895
- Ernest A. Daltry 1895 - 1899
- L. F. Lejeune 1899 - 1902
- T. Edgar Shields 1902 - 1948
- Robert K. Chapman 1949 – 1953
- Jack Freefield 1953 - 1954
- Frederick W. Graf 1954 - 1992
- J. Clinton Miller 1992 - 1993
- Russell Jackson 1993 - 2013
- Thomas C. Flynn 2013 – 2014
- Stephen C. Williams 2014 – 2022
- Jamed E. Derr 2022 – 2024
- Greg Funfgeld 2023 – 2024
- Nicholas Halbert 2024 –

== See also ==
- List of cathedrals in the United States
- List of the Episcopal cathedrals of the United States
- St. Stephen's Episcopal Pro-Cathedral (Wilkes-Barre, Pennsylvania)
