= Mark Antony De Wolfe Howe (bishop) =

American Episcopal bishop

The Right Reverend Mark Antony De Wolfe Howe D.D., LL.D.
- Bishop of Central Pennsylvania
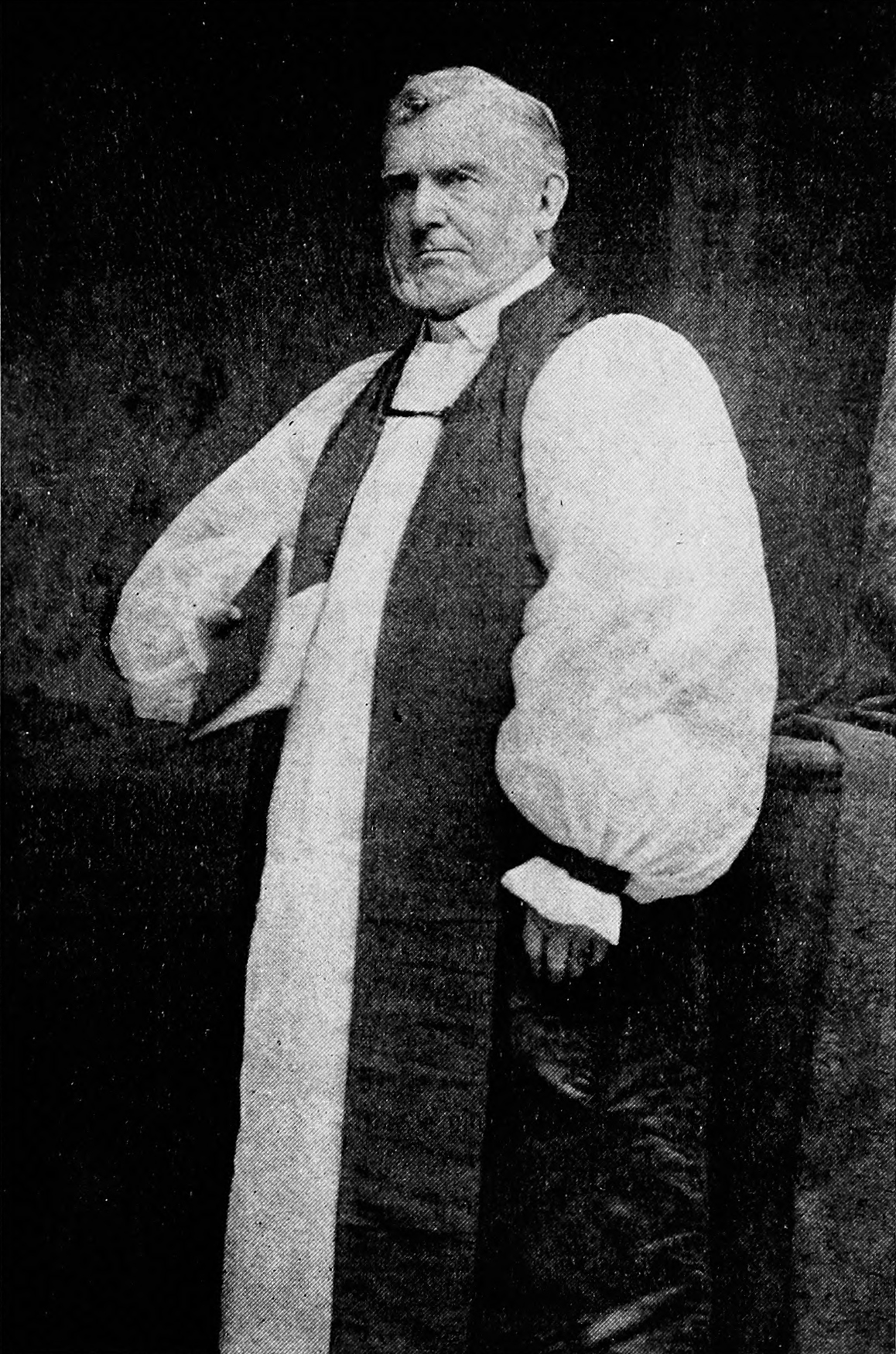
- Church: Episcopal Church
- Diocese: Central Pennsylvania
- Elected: 1871
- In office: 1871–1891
- Successor: Nelson Somerville Rulison
- Previous posts: Rector of St. Luke's Church, Philadelphia, PA

Orders
- Ordination: March 12, 1833 by Alexander Viets Griswold
- Consecration: December 28, 1871 by Benjamin B. Smith

Personal details
- Born: April 5, 1808 Bristol, Rhode Island, United States
- Died: July 31, 1895 (aged 87) Bristol, Rhode Island, United States
- Denomination: Anglican
- Parents: John Howe & Louisa Smith
- Spouse: Julia Bowen Amory (m. 1833; died 1841) Elizabeth Smith Marshall (m. 1843; died 1855) Eliza Whitney (m. 1857)
- Children: 18

Mark Antony De Wolfe Howe (also Anthony, DeWolf, De Wolf, and DeWolfe; April 5, 1808 – July 31, 1895) was an Episcopal priest and later first Bishop of the Episcopal Diocese of Central Pennsylvania.

== Early life and education ==
Mark Antony De Wolfe Howe was born Mark Antony De Wolf Howe on April 5, 1808, in Bristol, Rhode Island. (Note: Some sources give his birth year as 1809.) (As an adult, he changed the spelling of his second middle name to De Wolfe.) He was the son of John and Louisa (Smith) Howe, and a descendant of James Howe, an English immigrant to Roxbury and Ipswich, Massachusetts, in 1637. Maternally, he was connected to Richard Smith, the first town clerk of Bristol, Rhode Island from the 1680s. He was also a great-grandson to Senator James De Wolf.

He attended Phillips Academy, Andover, and Middlebury College in Vermont. He left Middlebury to pursue education at Brown University, his father's alma mater. He graduated from Brown in 1828, having becoming friends with Francis Wayland, a president of Brown.

He taught Latin at Brown, as well as in the public schools of Boston. At the same time he studied law at his father's law office. Howe studied religion under John Bristed (son-in-law of John Jacob Astor and father of Charles Astor Bristed).

He was the recipient of several honorary degrees, including a LL.D. from the University of Pennsylvania in 1876.

== Ordination and pastoral career ==
In 1832, Howe was ordained deacon by Alexander V. Griswold, bishop of the Eastern Diocese, at Saint Matthew's Episcopal Church, South Boston.

Before the end of 1832, Howe became rector of Saint James' Episcopal Church, Roxbury, Massachusetts, serving until 1846, when he was called to Saint Luke's Episcopal Church, Philadelphia, Pennsylvania, where he remained rector for 25 years.

He attended General Conventions in 1850, 1859, and 1865, helping lay the foundation for the church hymnal. He wrote Memoirs of the Life and Services of the Right Reverend Alonzo Potter, D. D., LL. D. in 1871.

That same year, Howe was elected bishop of the newly formed Diocese of Central Pennsylvania. The original Diocese of Central Pennsylvania was the predecessor diocese of the Diocese of Bethlehem, and as a result, he is counted as first bishop of Bethlehem as well. (Note: The Diocese of Pennsylvania was divided in 1871, with the western portion named Diocese of Central Pennsylvania and Reading made the see city, overseen by Bishop Howe. The see was moved to Bethlehem in 1890. In 1904, the diocese was divided, with the eastern part keeping the name Central Pennsylvania and the western half taking the name Diocese of Harrisburg. The eastern diocese changed its name to Bethlehem in 1909, and Harrisburg changed its name to Central Pennsylvania beginning in 1972. Therefore, the original and current dioceses of Central Pennsylvania are not in fact the same jurisdiction.) He was the father of writer Mark Antony De Wolfe Howe. In 1891, Howe retired to his home in Bristol, Rhode Island, where he died on July 31, 1895.

=== Consecrators ===
- Benjamin Bosworth Smith, ninth presiding bishop of the Episcopal Church
- Charles Pettit McIlvaine
- Alfred Lee

Howe was the 99th bishop consecrated in the Episcopal Church.

=== Family ===
Mark Antony DeWolfe Howe married, first, Julia Bowen Amory (1804-1841) and had 5 children:

- Louisa Smith Howe, October 3, 1834 – March 18, 1845
- Thomas Amory Howe, March 24, 1836 – February 7, 1840
- Mary Amory Howe, May 4, 1837 – January 4, 1867, married William Hobart Hare, D.D., Missionary Bishop of Niobrara.
- Helen Maria Howe, July 19, 1838 – April 4, 1839
- Julia Amory Howe, April 30, 1840 – May 9, 1841

Mark Antony DeWolfe Howe married, second, Elizabeth Smith Marshall (1822-1855) and had 8 children:

- Herbert Marshall Howe, July 16, 1844 – September 30, 1916
- Reginald Heber Howe, April 9, 1846 – June 6, 1924
- Mark Antony DeWolfe Howe, 1848 – June 2, 1860
- Julia Amory Howe, January 31, 1850 – June 22, 1850
- Elizabeth Marshall Howe, May 12, 1851 – 1904, married George Pomeroy Allen
- Frank Perley Howe, September 19, 1853 – August 24, 1922
- Alfred Leighton Howe, April 4, 1854 – 1911
- John Ernest Howe, September 22, 1855 – May 1, 1857

Mark Antony DeWolfe Howe married, third, Eliza Whitney (1826-1909), daughter of Asa Whitney, and had 5 children:

- Anna Barnard Howe, May 8, 1858 – May 28, 1858
- Arthur Whitney Howe, May 15, 1859 – 1953
- Antoinette DeWolf Howe, January 13, 1861 – April 3, 1862
- Mark Antony DeWolfe Howe, August 28, 1864 – December 6, 1960
- Wallis Eastburn Howe, September 12, 1868 – September 15, 1960

== See also ==
- DeWolf family
- Succession of Bishops of the Episcopal Church in the United States
