= St. Stephen's Episcopal Cathedral (Harrisburg, Pennsylvania) =

Historic church in Pennsylvania, United States

- St. Stephen's Cathedral
- U.S. Historic district – Contributing property
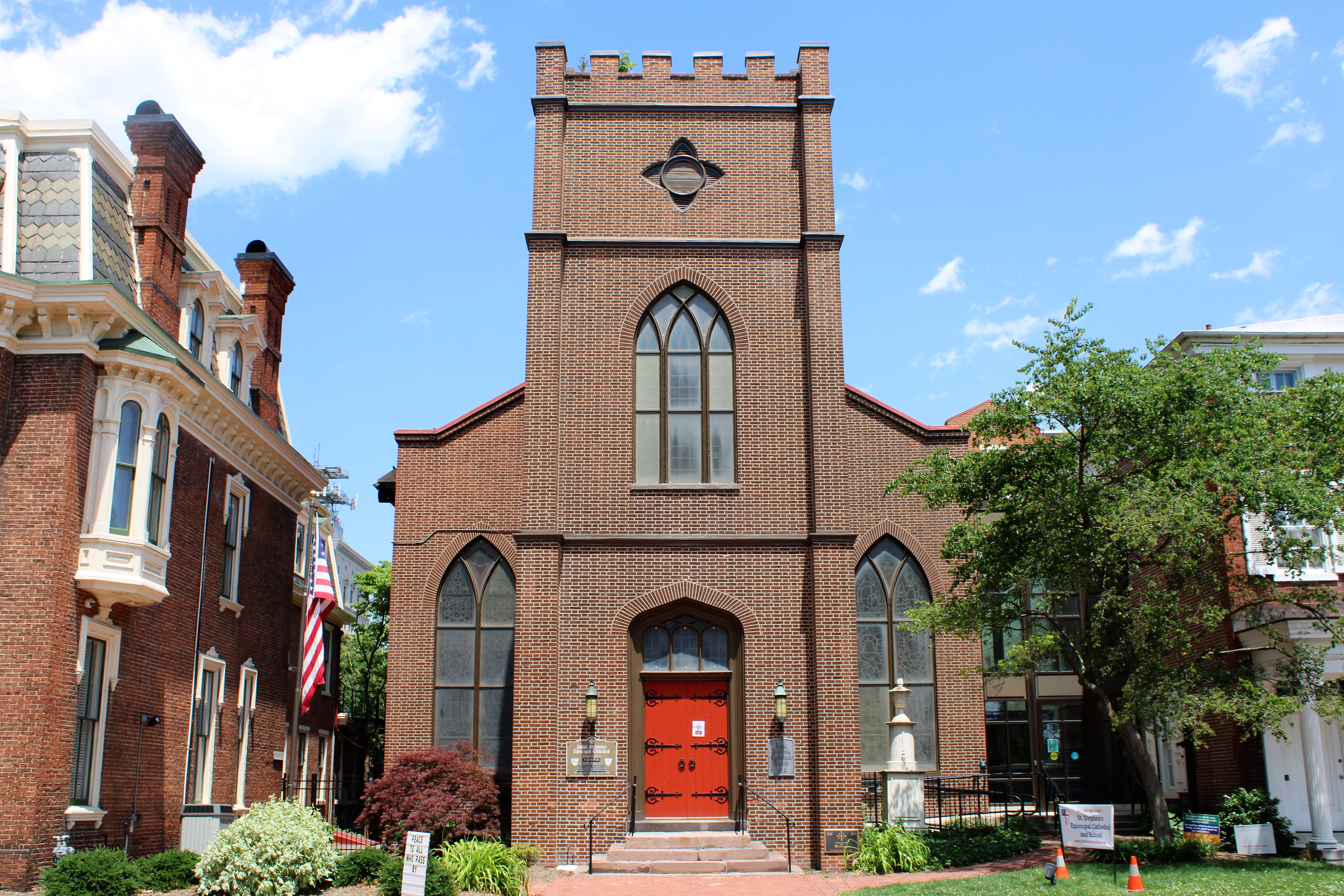

- Location within Pennsylvania Location within the United States
- Location: 221 North Front St. Harrisburg, Pennsylvania
- Coordinates: 40°15′38.79″N 76°53′8.78″W
- Built: 1826
- Part of: Harrisburg Historic District (ID76001632)
- Added to NRHP: January 19, 1976

St. Stephen's Episcopal Cathedral is a cathedral of the Episcopal Church in the United States. It was the mother church of the former Episcopal Diocese of Central Pennsylvania and was the seat of its bishop. Since January 1, 2026, it has been a co-cathedral of the Diocese of the Susquehanna, formed by the union of the Diocese of Central Pennsylvania and the Diocese of Bethlehem. The Cathedral, Cathedral House and Chapter House are located on Front Street in Downtown Harrisburg, Pennsylvania along the Susquehanna River. St. Stephen's School is just around the corner on Cranberry Street. The nave of the church was constructed in 1826 and can seat about 300 people. St. Stephen's became the diocesan cathedral on January 27, 1932. The church is a contributing property in the Harrisburg Historic District on the National Register of Historic Places.

In 2024, the cathedral reported average Sunday attendance (ASA) of 126 persons and plate and pledge income of $633,633; in 2023, it reported 569 members.

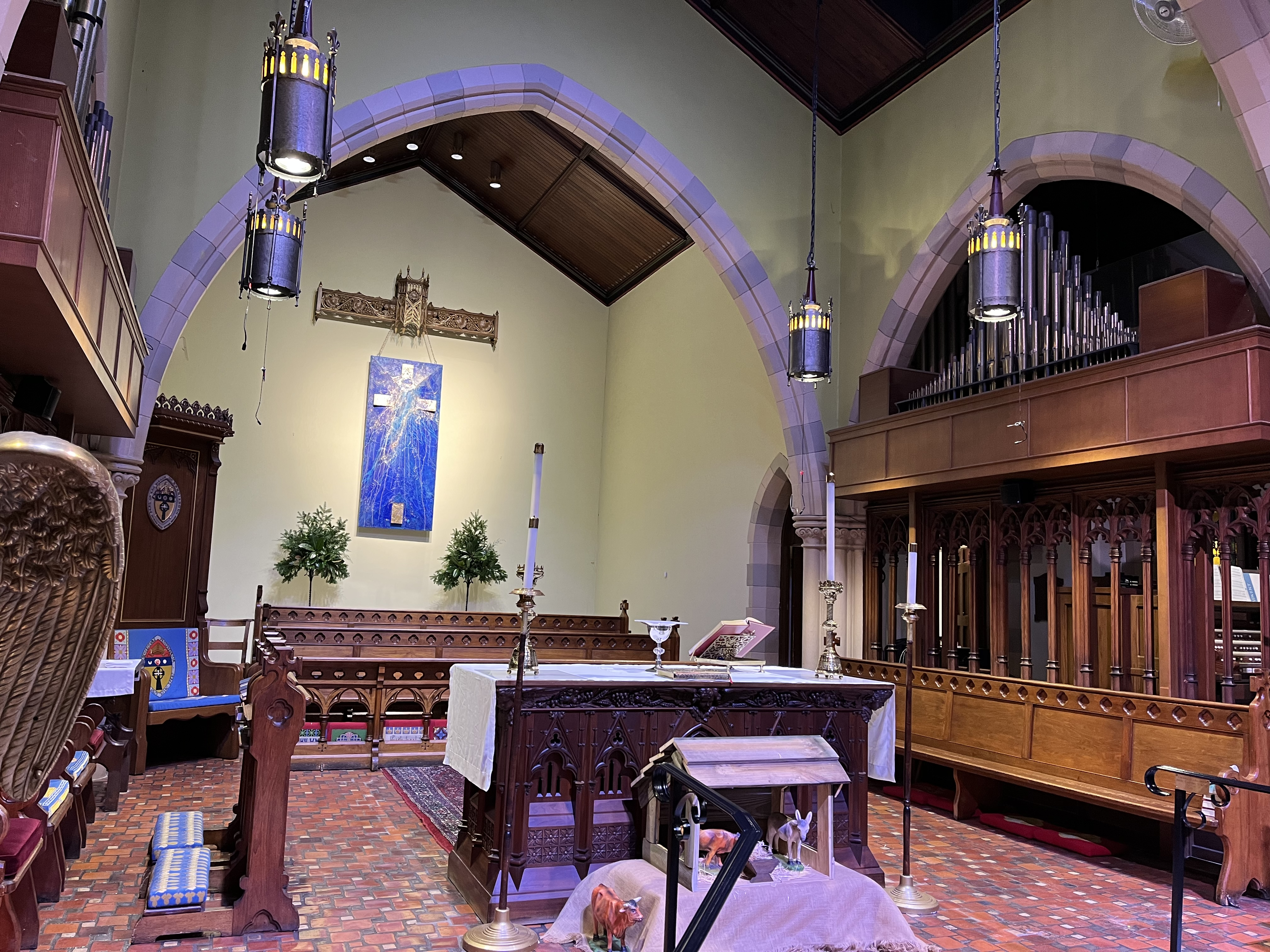
Chancel

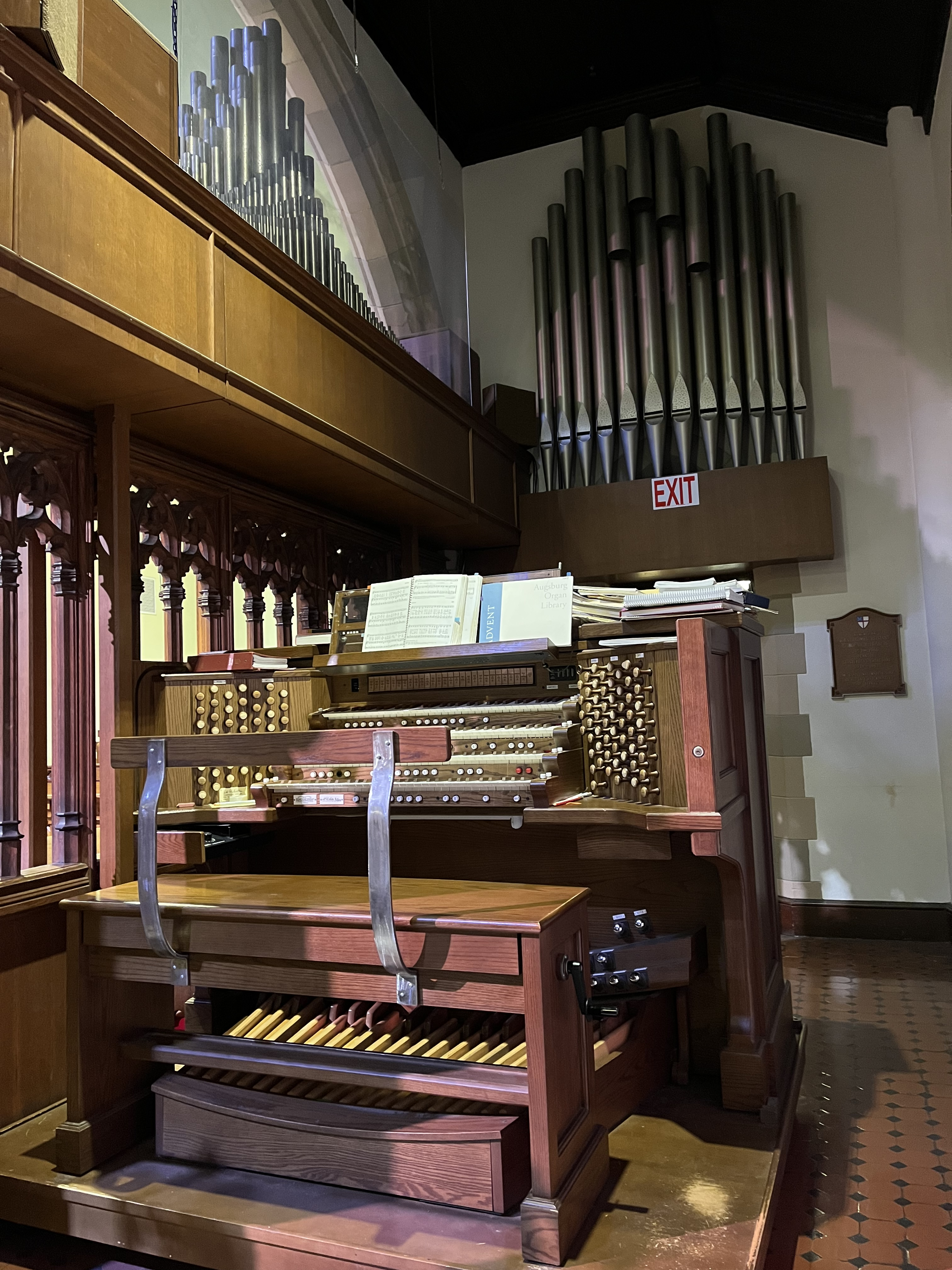
Pipe organ

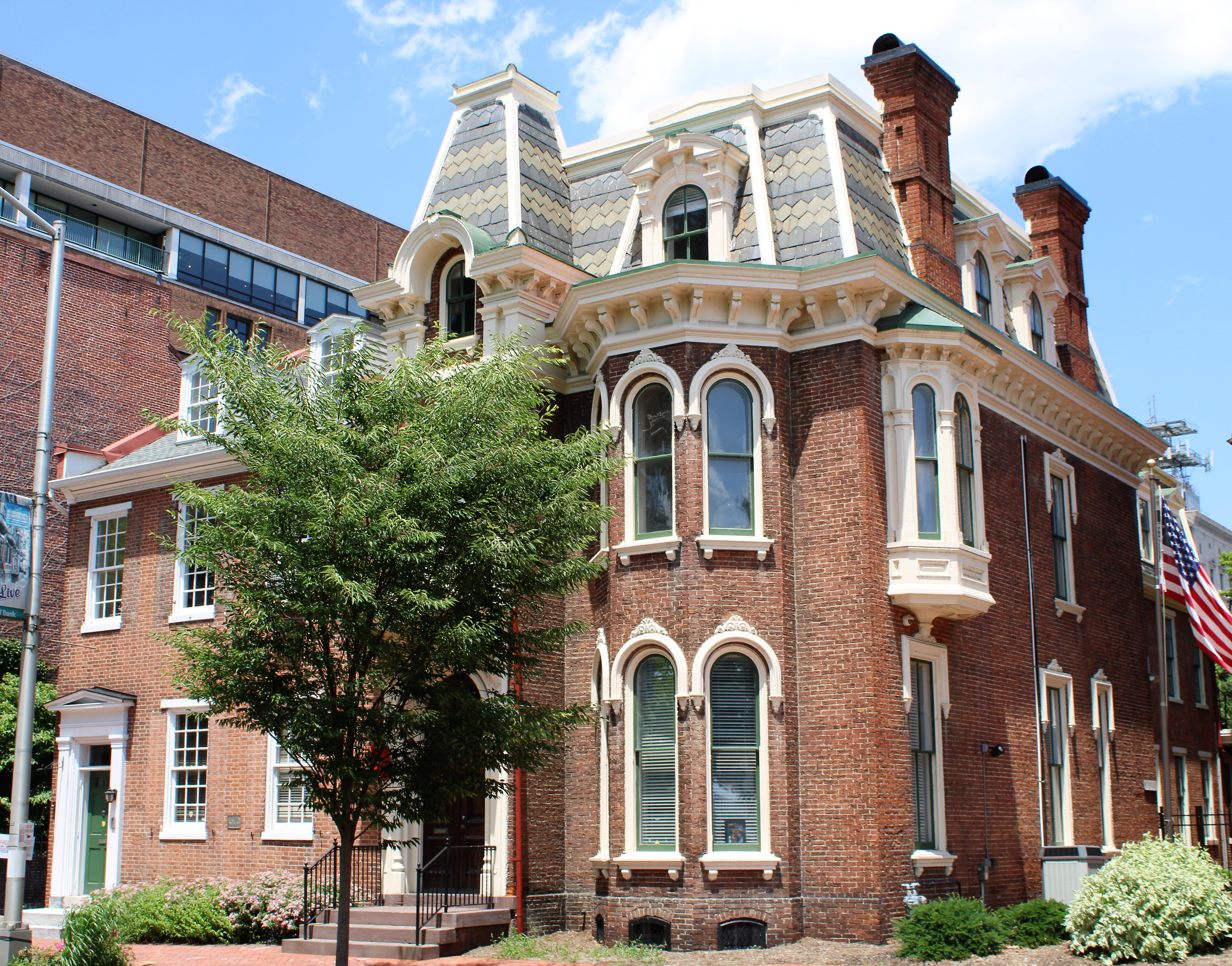
Parish House

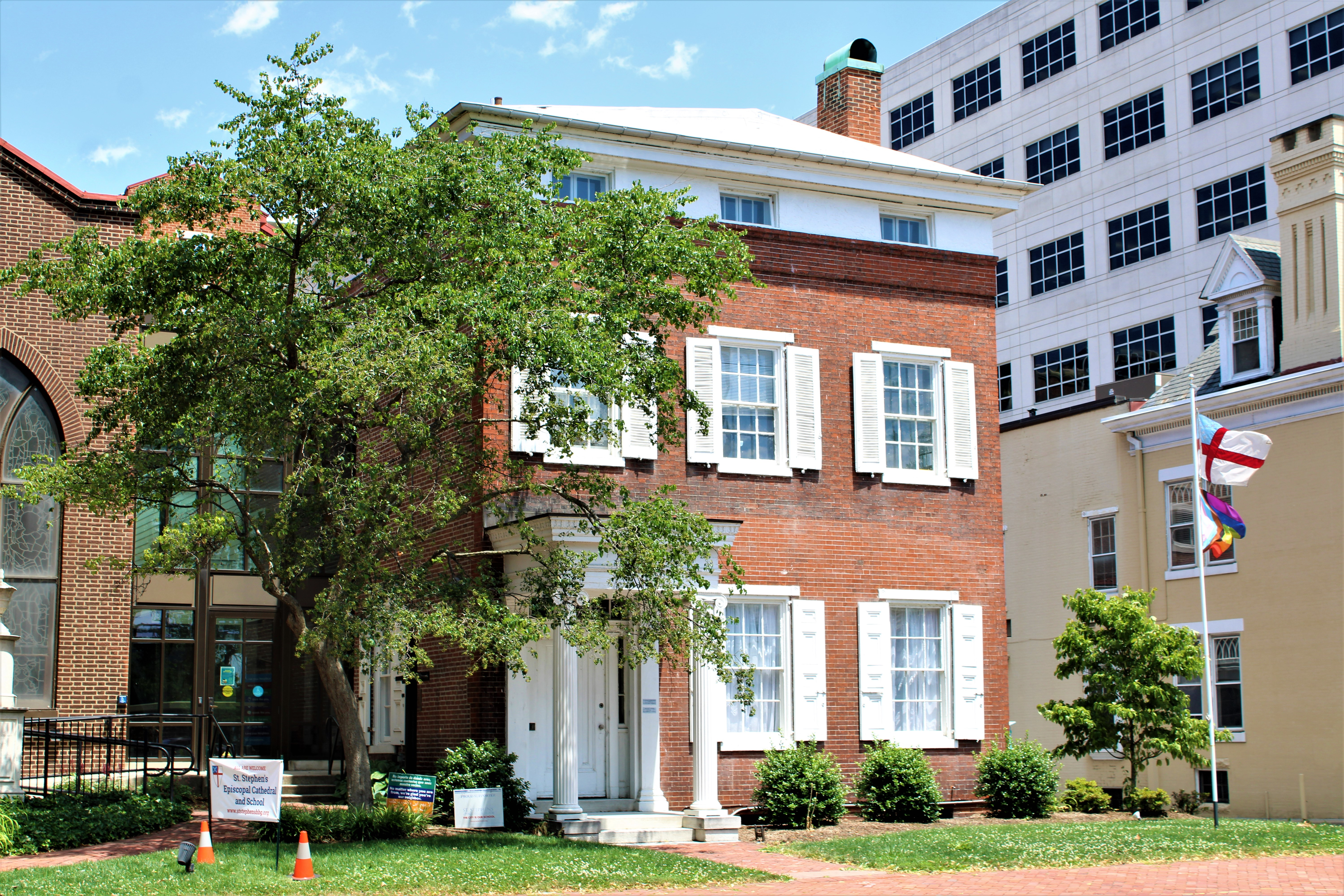
School

== See also ==
- List of the Episcopal cathedrals of the United States
- List of cathedrals in the United States
