= Audrey Scanlan =

American bishop (born c.1959)

The Right Reverend Audrey Cady Scanlan
- Bishop of the Susquehanna
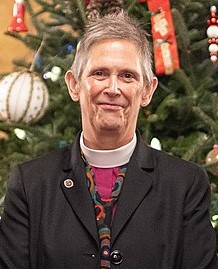
- Bishop Scanlan in 2022
- Church: Episcopal Church
- Province: III
- Diocese: Susquehanna
- Elected: October 18, 2025
- In office: 2026–present
- Predecessor: Kevin D. Nichols (as Bishop of Bethlehem)
- Previous post: Bishop of Central Pennsylvania (2015–2025)

Orders
- Consecration: September 12, 2015 by Katharine Jefferts Schori

Personal details
- Born: c. 1959 New York, United States
- Denomination: Anglican
- Spouse: Glenn (m. 1984)
- Children: 3
- Education: Wheaton College (B.A.); Central Connecticut State University; Yale Divinity School (M.Div.); Berkeley Divinity School; Hartford Seminary (D.Min.)

Audrey Cady Scanlan (born c. 1959) is an American Episcopal bishop. She was the 11th bishop of the Episcopal Diocese of Central Pennsylvania from September 12, 2015 through 2025 and is the first and current bishop of the Diocese of the Susquehanna since 2026.

== Personal life ==
Scanlan was born in New York, and moved to Connecticut as a child. In 1980, she earned a Bachelor of Arts degree in psychology from Wheaton College. Scanlan married her husband Glenn in 1984. After having three children and working in catering, Scanlan received a graduate degree in elementary education from Central Connecticut State University.

== Clerical career ==
Scanlan received a Master of Divinity degree in 2003 from Yale Divinity School as well as a Certificate in Anglican Studies from Berkeley Divinity School. She continued her education at Hartford Seminary, receiving a Doctor of Ministry degree in 2011.

On March 14, 2015, Scanlan was elected to the post of Bishop of Central Pennsylvania, on the second ballot from a field of three candidates. Prior to this, she served in the Episcopal Diocese of Connecticut. Scanlan received 79 of 147 lay votes and 50 of 79 clergy votes (74 lay votes and 40 clergy votes were required for election). Scanlan succeeded the Right Reverend Nathan D. Baxter, who retired in May 2014, as well as the Rt. Rev. Robert R. Gepert who had served as provisional bishop. She was the first female bishop of the diocese. In 2024, the Diocese of Bethlehem and the Diocese of Central Pennsylvania voted to reunite. On October 18, 2025, Bishop Scanlan was elected to be the first bishop of the new diocese. When the dioceses united on January 1st, 2026, she took her post.

== Social views ==
=== Same-sex marriage ===
Scanlan approves of the blessing of same-sex marriages.

In 2016, the Anglican Communion, of which the Episcopal Church is a member, voted to penalize the U.S. church after it approved rites for the blessing of same-sex marriages. The Church was given a three-year ban from voting on policy decisions made by the Communion. Scanlan responded to the Communion's action by comparing it to a time-out which would not cause the church to "spend much time reflecting on the error of our ways," nor cause the Church to reverse its policy towards same-sex marriage.

=== Gun control ===
In 2023, Scanlan was a part of an interfaith group who called upon the Pennsylvania General Assembly to passed legislation to implement red flag laws, limit monthly gun purchases, and prohibit semi-automatic weapons and high capacity magazines.

== See also ==
- List of Episcopal bishops of the United States
- Historical list of the Episcopal bishops of the United States
