= St. Stephen's Episcopal Pro-Cathedral (Wilkes-Barre, Pennsylvania) =

Historic church in Pennsylvania, United States

St. Stephen's Pro-Cathedral
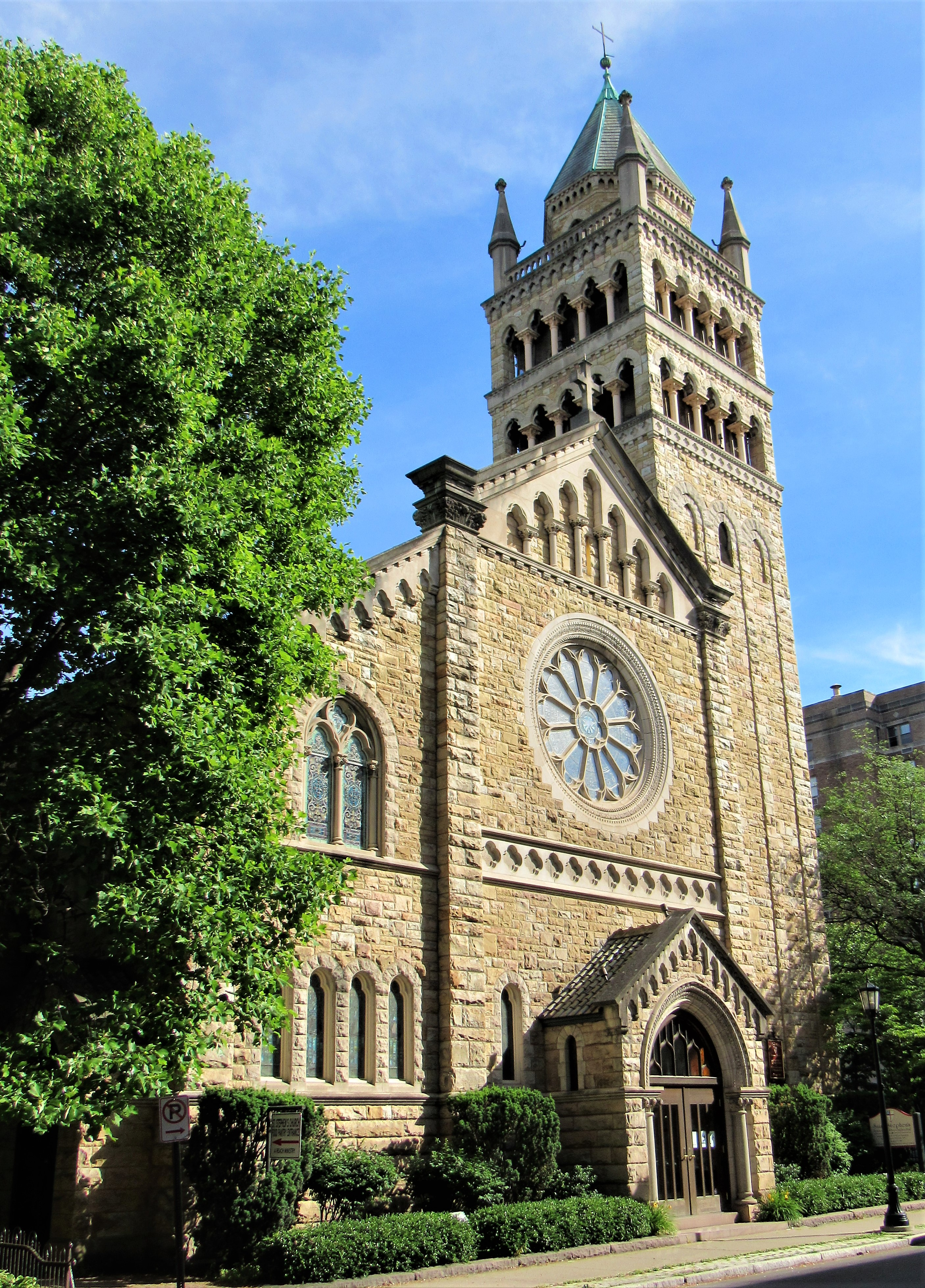

- Location of St. Stephen's Episcopal Pro-Cathedral in Pennsylvania
- 41°14′48″N 75°53′04″W
- Location: 35 S. Franklin St. Wilkes-Barre, Pennsylvania
- Country: United States
- Denomination: Episcopal Church in the United States of America
- Website: ststephenswb.org

History
- Founded: 1817

Architecture
- Architect: Charles M. Burns
- Style: Romanesque Revival
- Completed: 1897

Administration
- Diocese: Bethlehem

Clergy
- Rector: The Rev. Timothy Alleman, Rector
- St. Stephen's Episcopal Pro-Cathedral
- U.S. Historic district – Contributing property
- Part of: River Street Historic District (ID85002328)
- Added to NRHP: September 10, 1985

St. Stephen's Episcopal Pro-Cathedral is an Episcopal church located in Wilkes-Barre, Luzerne County, Pennsylvania. It was the Pro-Cathedral in the former Diocese of Bethlehem. The Cathedral Church of the Nativity in Bethlehem, Pennsylvania served as the primary cathedral of the former diocese.

St. Stephen's Church began in 1817. The present church building is the fifth one for the parish. It was completed in 1897 and consecrated in 1899. Philadelphia architect Charles M. Burns designed the church in the Romanesque Revival style.

In 2025, the cathedral reported average Sunday attendance (ASA) of 44 persons and plate and pledge income of $149,565; in 2025, it reported 272 members. Reported attendance was a relative decrease from 160 in 2015.
