= Episcopal Diocese of the Susquehanna =

Episcopal Church diocese in the US

Coordinates: 40.61053°N 75.38424°W

Diocese of the Susquehanna
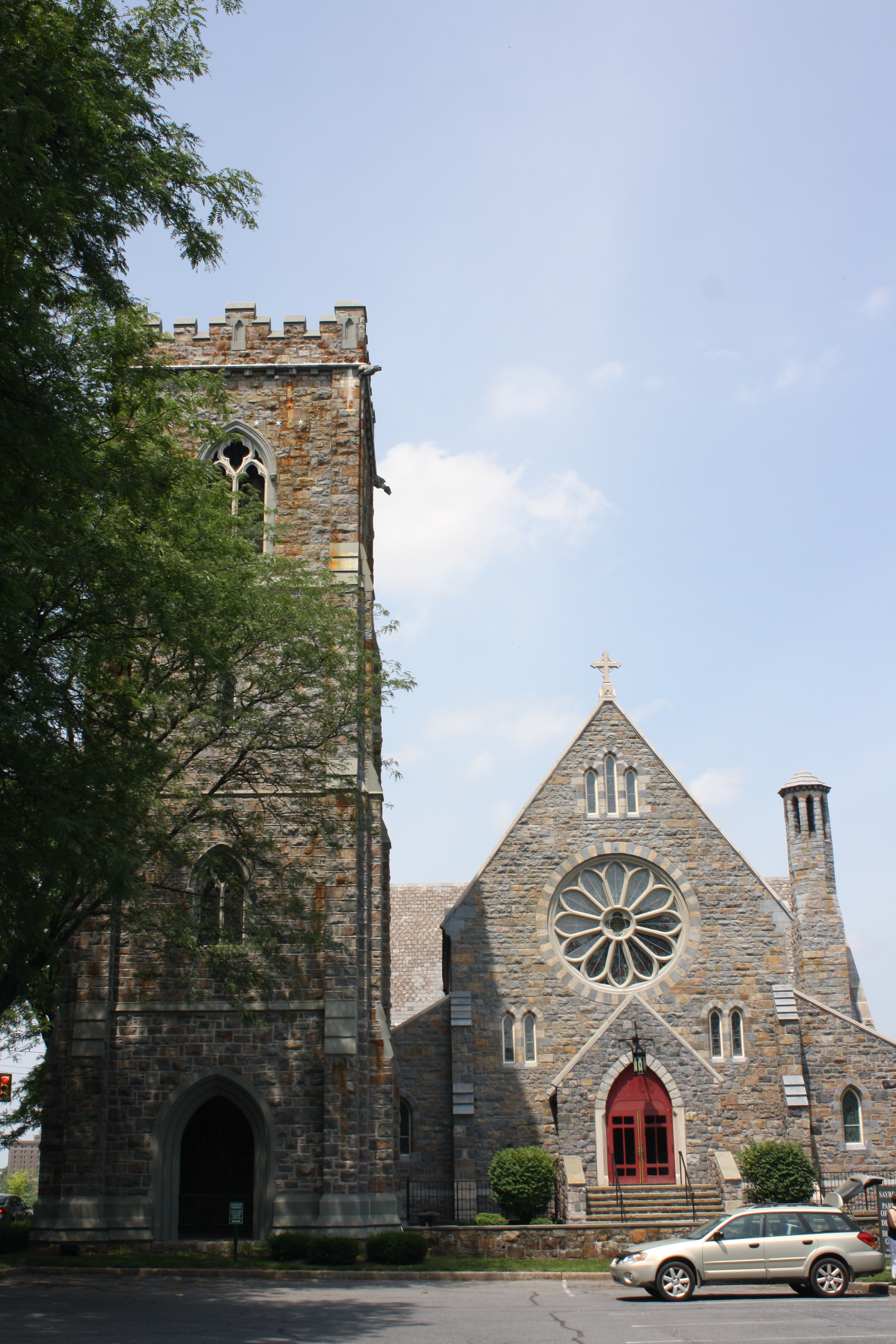
- Cathedral Church of the Nativity in Bethlehem, Pennsylvania

Location
- Country: United States
- Ecclesiastical province: III (Middle Atlantic)

Statistics
- Parishes: 117 (2023) (Note: Figures represent the combined 2023 totals of the Dioceses of Bethlehem and Central Pennsylvania.)
- Members: 15,402 (2023)

Information
- Denomination: Episcopal Church
- Established: November 8, 1871 January 1, 2026 (Merger)
- Cathedral: Cathedral Church of the Nativity (Bethlehem); St. Stephen's Episcopal Cathedral (Harrisburg)
- Language: English, Spanish

Current leadership
- Bishop: Audrey Scanlan
- Assistant bishop: Kevin D. Nichols

Map
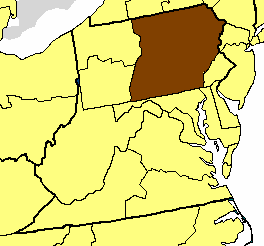
- Location of the Diocese of the Susquehanna

Website
- diosusquehanna.org

The Episcopal Diocese of the Susquehanna, formerly known as the Diocese of Central Pennsylvania (1871–1909) and the Diocese of Bethlehem (1909–2025) is a diocese of the Episcopal Church. It encompasses 39 counties across central and northwestern Pennsylvania with co-cathedrals in Bethlehem and Harrisburg. Established in 1871 from territory carved out of the Diocese of Pennsylvania, it was divided in 1904 to form a new Harrisburg-based diocese. This diocese, which was separately called the Diocese of Central Pennsylvania from the 1970s on, reunified with the Diocese of Bethlehem effective on January 1, 2026, under the name the Diocese of the Susquehanna.

== History ==
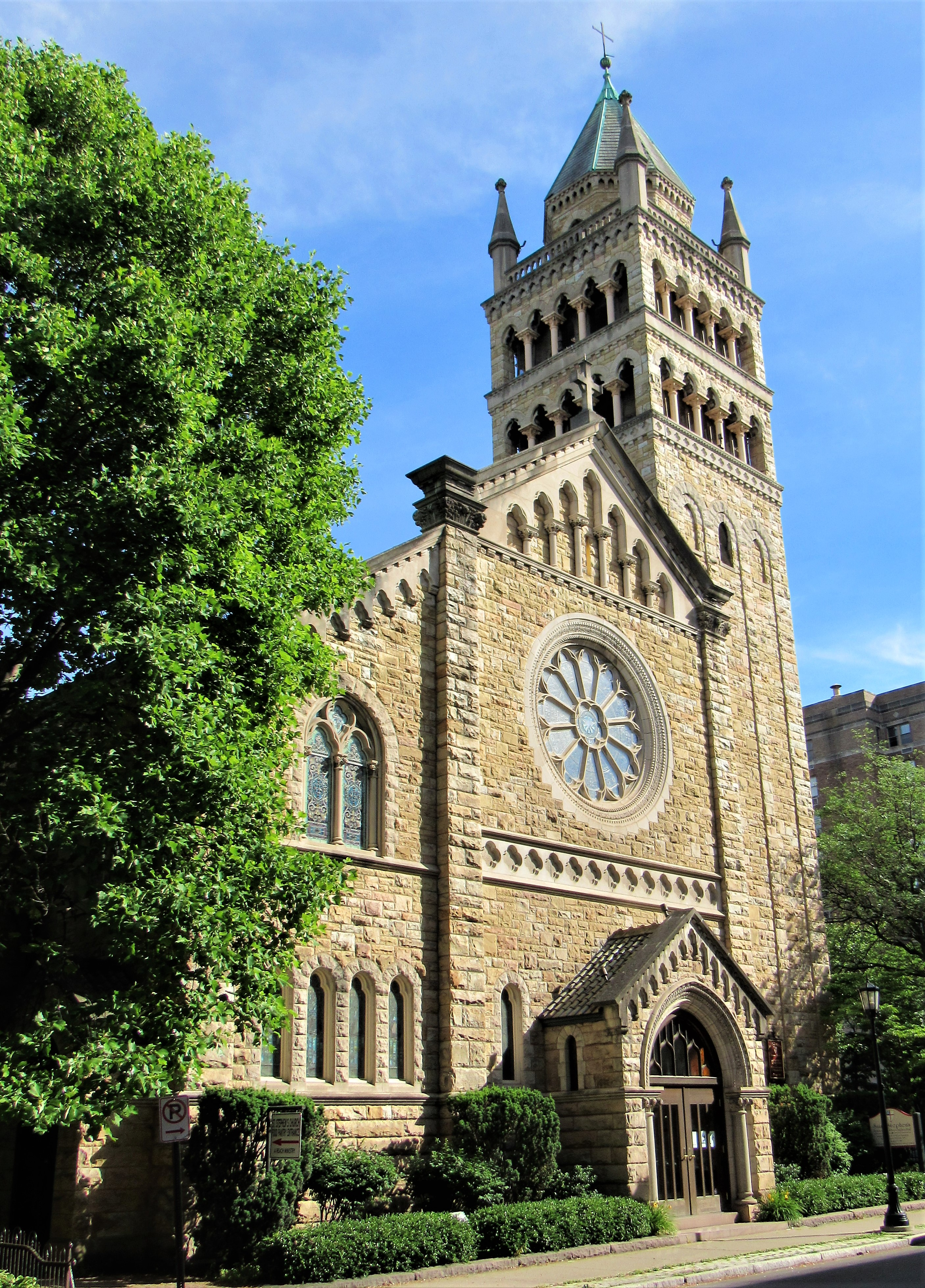
St. Stephen's Cathedral in Wilkes-Barre, Pennsylvania

The first Anglican services in the area comprising the Diocese of the Susquehanna were held in Perkiomen in 1700. Evan Evans, rector of Philadelphia's Christ Church, ministered to settlers there. Two years later, this group formed the parish of St. James, Collegeville.

The Reverend Robert Weyman of Philadelphia's Welsh Tract was another early missionary to the iron industry settlements beyond the city. In 1719 he began visiting the Anglican congregation which became Bangor Church, Churchville.

The Society for the Propagation of the Gospel was formed in London in 1701, with the initial goal of funding missionary clergy in America. Until the American Revolution brought an end the Society's activities in the United States, it provided support to the few itinerant Anglican clergy in rural Pennsylvania.

In early Pennsylvania settlements, missionaries of the Church of Sweden and the Church of England had a cooperative relationship, and Anglicans often worshipped with the small Swedish congregations. As Sweden decreased support for these congregations, some were taken over by Anglican clergy. In 1753, a former Swedish church near Hopewell Furnace became St. Gabriel's Episcopal Church. St. Gabriel's later established a missionary parish in Reading, which at first met in members' homes. This parish, St. Mary's, later became Christ Church parish.

In 1785, William White convened a meeting at Christ Church in Philadelphia for the purpose of organizing the Episcopal Church in the Commonwealth of Pennsylvania. The conference included laymen as well as clergy, an arrangement which had no precedent in England. St. Mary's in Reading, St. Gabriel's in Morlatton (now Douglassville), St. James in Lancaster and St. James in Perkiomen (now Collegeville) were among the fifteen parishes represented at the conference. Plans were made for the first official convention of the Diocese of Pennsylvania, and delegates were chosen to attend the first General Convention for the national Episcopal Church, held later that year at the same location. The Diocese of Pennsylvania received its first bishop in 1787 when William White was consecrated bishop at Lambeth Chapel.

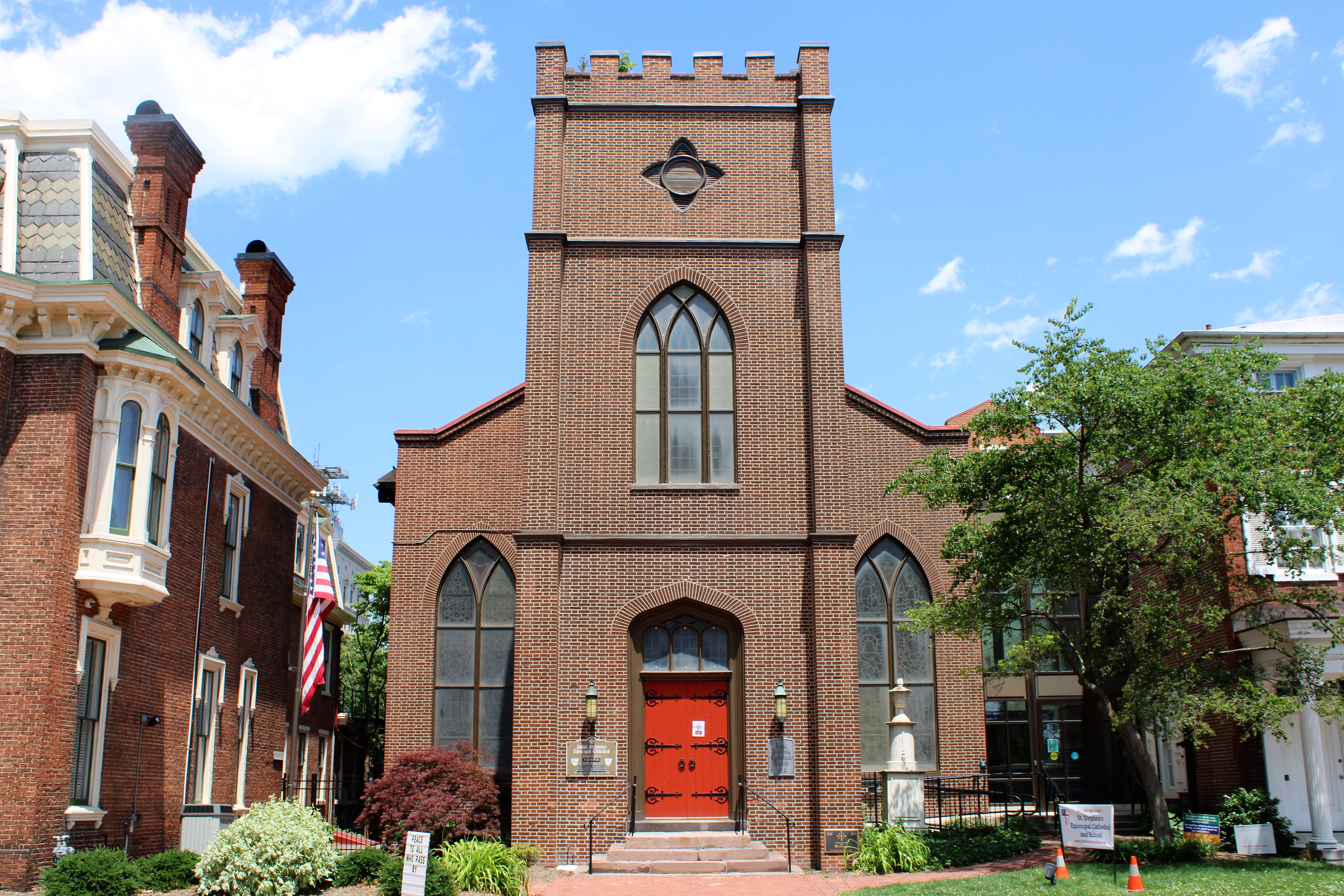
St. Stephen's Episcopal Cathedral in Harrisburg.

In 1871, the area of the present Diocese of the Susquehanna was divided from the Diocese of Pennsylvania. The original name was the Diocese of Central Pennsylvania, and the cathedral was in Reading. In 1904, the western part of the diocese was separated to form the Diocese of Harrisburg. This left the eastern part of the diocese, now based in Bethlehem, covering a territory that "the name lost much of its significance." At the 1909 diocesan convention, a resolution was passed that changed the name to Diocese of Bethlehem, which took effect May 26, 1909. In the 1970s, the name of Central Pennsylvania was re-adopted by the former Diocese of Harrisburg.

In October 2022, the diocesan conventions of Central Pennsylvania and Bethlehem initiated the process for exploring reunification. On October 19, 2024, the conventions of the two dioceses both voted to unify as the Episcopal Diocese of the Susquehanna, effective January 1, 2026. On October 18, 2025, the bishop of Central Pennsylvania Audrey Scanlan was elected as the first bishop of the Diocese of the Susquehanna. On the predetermined date, the two dioceses successfully reunited, with the Diocese of Bethlehem being the surviving entity under the plan of merger.

== List of bishops ==
Bishops of Central Pennsylvania
From	Until	Incumbent	Notes
1871	1891	Mark Antony De Wolfe Howe	
1891	1897	Nelson Somerville Rulison	
1898	1905	Ethelbert Talbot	Previously Missionary Bishop of Wyoming and Idaho; became Bishop of Bethlehem.
Bishops of Bethlehem
1905	1928	Ethelbert Talbot	Previously Bishop of Central Pennsylvania; Presiding Bishop (as senior bishop) 1924–1926.
1928	1954	Frank W. Sterrett	Frank William Sterret; coadjutor bishop since 1923.
1954	1971	Frederick J. Warnecke	Frederick John "Fred" Warnecke (died February 23, 1977, Boca Raton, FL, aged 70)
1971	1983	Lloyd E. Gressle	Lloyd Edward Gressle (June 13, 1918, Cleveland, OH – December 7, 1999, East Quogue, NY)
1983	1995	Mark Dyer	James J. Mark Dyer (born June 7, 1930, Manchester, NH)
1996	2013	Paul V. Marshall	Paul Victor Marshall, retired December 31, 2013
2014	2018	Sean W. Rowe	Provisional Bishop, March 1, 2014 – September 15, 2018
2018	2025	Kevin D. Nichols	Kevin D. Nichols, elected April 28, 2018; ordained September 15, 2018 Assistant bishop of the Susquehanna, 2026–present.
Bishops of the Susquehanna
2026		Audrey Scanlan	Previously Bishop of Central Pennsylvania (2015–2025)
