= Nelson Somerville Rulison =

American bishop (1842–1897)

The Right Reverend Nelson Somerville Rulison D.D.
- Bishop of Central Pennsylvania
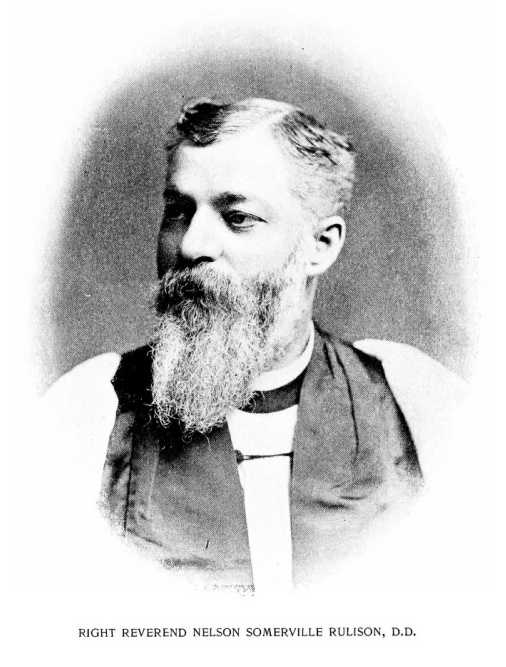
- Church: Episcopal Church
- Diocese: Central Pennsylvania
- Elected: 1891
- In office: 1891–1897
- Predecessor: Mark Antony De Wolfe Howe
- Successor: Ethelbert Talbot
- Previous post: Assistant Bishop of Central Pennsylvania (1884-1891)

Orders
- Ordination: November 30, 1866 by Horatio Potter
- Consecration: October 28, 1884 by Alfred Lee

Personal details
- Born: April 24, 1842 Carthage, New York, United States
- Died: September 1, 1897 (aged 55) Mannheim, German Empire
- Buried: Nisky Hill Cemetery, Bethlehem
- Denomination: Anglican
- Parents: Nelson J Rulison & Sophia Van Antwerp
- Spouse: Georgia Blanche Rice
- Children: 5

Nelson Somerville Rulison (April 24, 1842 – September 1, 1897) was second bishop of Central Pennsylvania.

== Biography ==
Rulison was born on April 24, 1842, in Carthage, New York, born to a family whose ancestors were German nobles. He studied at the General Theological Seminary in New York City and graduated in 1866 after which he was ordained deacon. He served as assistant minister of the Church of the Annunciation in New York City. In 1867, he became rector of Zion Church in Morris, New York. In 1876 he transferred to Cleveland, Ohio, to become rector of St Paul's Church.

Rulison was elected Assistant Bishop of Central Pennsylvania (later the Episcopal Diocese of Bethlehem, later the Diocese of the Susquehanna) on June 12, 1884. He was subsequently consecrated on October 28, 1884, by Presiding Bishop Alfred Lee and co-consecrators William Bacon Stevens, Bishop of Pennsylvania and Samuel Smith Harris, Bishop of Michigan. He was consecrated in St Paul's Church in Cleveland, Ohio. He became Bishop of Central Pennsylvania in 1891.

He died in Mannheim, Germany on September 1, 1897.
