= Episcopal Diocese of Central Pennsylvania =

Diocese of the Episcopal Church in the United States

Coordinates: 40.26104°N 76.88605°W

Diocese of Central Pennsylvania

Location
- Country: United States
- Ecclesiastical province: Province III

Statistics
- Congregations: 59 (2025)
- Members: 7,156 (2025)

Information
- Denomination: Episcopal Church
- Established: November 29, 1904
- Dissolved: January 1, 2026 (Merged with Diocese of Bethlehem)
- Cathedral: St Stephen's Cathedral

Leadership
- Bishop: Audrey Scanlan

Map
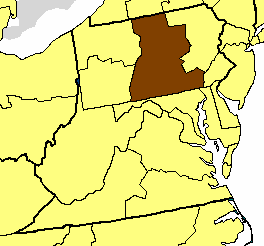
- Location of the Diocese of Central Pennsylvania

Website
- www.diocesecpa.org

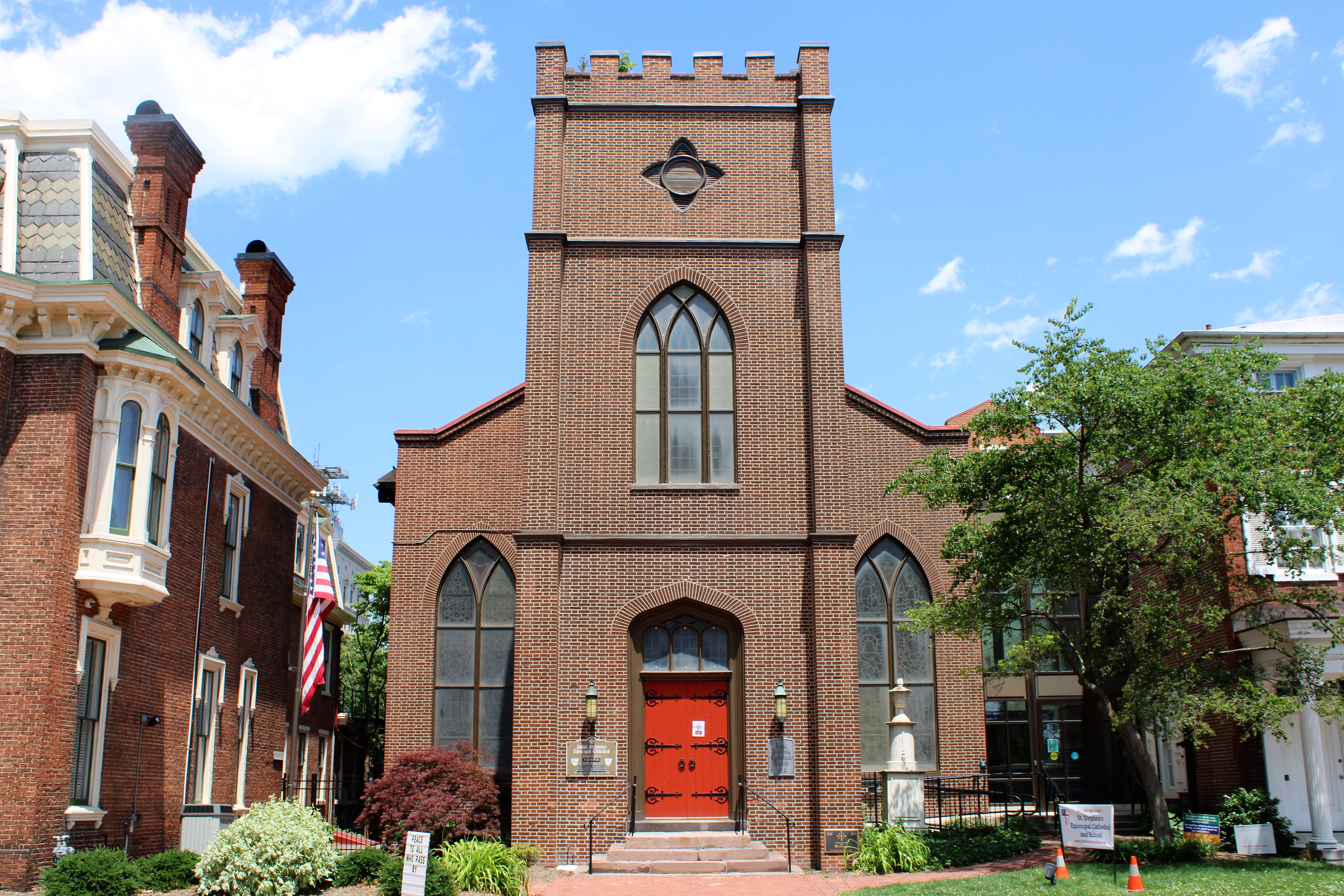
St. Stephen's Cathedral, Harrisburg

The Episcopal Diocese of Central Pennsylvania was one of the dioceses of the Episcopal Church in the United States of America. It was established in 1904 as the Diocese of Harrisburg, separating from the original Diocese of Central Pennsylvania formerly known as the Episcopal Diocese of Bethlehem. It reunited with the Diocese of Bethlehem in 2026 to form the Diocese of the Susquehanna.

The seat of the bishop and home of the diocesan offices was St. Stephen's Episcopal Cathedral at 221 North Front Street in Downtown Harrisburg, Pennsylvania.

In 2025, the diocese reported average Sunday attendance (ASA) of 2,832 persons. This was a relative decline from ASA of 4,137 reported in 2015. Membership declined from 12,229 in 2015 to 7,156 in 2025 before the formation of the Diocese of the Susquehanna.

== History ==
In 1871, the original Diocese of Central Pennsylvania was established. In 1904, the Diocese of Harrisburg split off from the old Diocese of Central Pennsylvania, leaving the remainder to rename itself the Diocese of Bethlehem in 1909. In the 1970s, the name of Central Pennsylvania was re-adopted by the Diocese of Harrisburg. In October 2022, the diocesan conventions of Central Pennsylvania and Bethlehem initiated the process for exploring reunification. On October 19, 2024, the conventions of the two dioceses both voted to unify as the Episcopal Diocese of the Susquehanna, effective January 1, 2026. On the predetermined date, the dioceses reunited to form the Diocese of the Susquehanna.

In the 1880s, the first boys' choir in the diocese was established at Christ Church in Reading, Pennsylvania.

From October 2006 until May 2014, Nathan D. Baxter was the bishop of the diocese. Following Baxter's retirement Robert R. Gepert was named as provisional bishop of the diocese. On 14 March 2015, Audrey Scanlan was elected to become the next bishop of the diocese; she was consecrated in September 2015.

== List of Bishops ==
	Bishop	Dates
1st	Mark Antony De Wolfe Howe	1871-1891 (First Bishop of Central Pennsylvania, present day Diocese of Bethlehem)
2nd	Nelson Somerville Rulison	1891-1897 (Second Bishop of Central Pennsylvania, present day Diocese of Bethlehem)
3rd	Ethelbert Talbot	1898-1904 (Third Bishop of Central Pennsylvania, present day Diocese of Bethlehem)
4th	James Henry Darlington	1905- 1930 (First Bishop of Harrisburg after diocese was created in 1904)
5th	Hunter Wyatt-Brown	1931-1943 (Second Bishop of Harrisburg)
6th	J. Thomas Heistand	1943-1966 (Third Bishop of Harrisburg)
7th	Dean T. Stevenson	1966-1982 (Forth and Last Bishop of Harrisburg & First Bishop of Central Pennsylvania after name was changed in 1971)
8th	Charlie F. McNutt	1982- 1995 (Coadjutor Bishop 1980–1982)
9th	Michael W. Creighton	1996-2006
10th	Nathan D. Baxter	2006-2014
11th	Audrey Scanlan	2015–2025

== See also ==
- Christ Episcopal Church (Reading, Pennsylvania)
