= Kinsolving =

Kinsolving is an American surname. It was first used in the 1770s in Virginia, U.S.. It is derived from Consolver and related to Kingsolver. Notable people with the surname include:

- Charles J. Kinsolving III (1904–1984), American Episcopal bishop
- George Herbert Kinsolving (1849–1928), American Episcopal bishop
- Isabelle Kinsolving (born 1979), American sailor
- Lee Kinsolving (1938–1974), American actor
- Lester Kinsolving (1927–2018), American talk radio host
- Lucien Lee Kinsolving (1862–1929), American Episcopal bishop
- Susan Kinsolving, American poet
- Wythe Leigh Kinsolving (1878–1964), American Episcopal priest

== See also ==
- Kinsolving Hall, an all-female residence hall of the University of Texas at Austin
