= Arthur B. Kinsolving =

American Episcopalian bishop (1884–1964)

The Right Reverend Arthur Barksdale Kinsolving D.D.
- Bishop of Arizona
- Church: Episcopal Church
- Diocese: Arizona
- In office: 1945–1962
- Predecessor: Walter Mitchell
- Successor: Joseph Harte

Orders
- Ordination: May 1925 by William Cabell Brown
- Consecration: May 29, 1945 by Henry St. George Tucker

Personal details
- Born: September 13, 1884 Rio Grande, Rio Grande do Sul, Brazil
- Died: June 15, 1964 (aged 79) Carmel, California, United States
- Buried: Trinity Cathedral (Phoenix, Arizona)
- Denomination: Anglican
- Parents: Lucien Lee Kinsolving & Alice Brown
- Spouse: Edith Wharton (m. 1927)
- Children: 3, including Lester Kinsolving

Arthur Barksdale Kinsolving II (September 13, 1884 – June 15, 1964) was the Bishop of Arizona in The Episcopal Church from 1945 until 1962.

== Early life and education ==
Kinsolving was born into a family of clergymen and two bishops, on September 13, 1884, in Rio Grande, Rio Grande do Sul, Brazil. His father, Lucien Lee Kinsolving, was a missionary bishop in Brazil who helped establish the Anglican Episcopal Church of Brazil. His mother was Alice Brown. He was educated at the Episcopal High School in Alexandria, Virginia During WWI he served as an ambulance driver with the French Army and later with the United States Army. He also became a first lieutenant and was later awarded the French Croix de Guerre. After the war, he graduated from the University of Virginia in 1917 and then from Virginia Theological Seminary from where he gained his Bachelor of Divinity in 1924.

== Ordained ministry ==
Kinsolving was ordained deacon in June 1924 by his father Lucien Lee Kinsolving, and priest in May 1925 by Bishop William Cabell Brown of Virginia. He served as assistant minister at the Church of St Paul of the University of Virginia from 1924 till 1927. Later he became chaplain at the United States Military Academy in West Point, New York. Between 1933 and 1940 he served as Dean of the Cathedral of the Incarnation in Garden City, New York.

== Episcopacy ==
Kinsolving was elected Missionary Bishop of Arizona in 1945 and was consecrated on May 29, 1945, by Presiding Bishop Henry St. George Tucker. In 1959, after the Missionary District of Arizona was established as the Diocese of Arizona, he became its first diocesan bishop. He retired a few years later in 1962. He died on June 15, 1965, in Carmel, California.

== Family ==
In addition to his father being a bishop, Kinsolving's uncle, George Herbert Kinsolving, his father's half brother, was the second Bishop of Texas. He married Edith Wharton and together had three sons. One of his sons, Arthur Barksdale Kinsolving III, died after an accident at the age of eighteen on January 22, 1948. His other son, Lester Kinsolving became a conservative political columnist, and talk radio host.
