= All Saints' Episcopal Church (Austin, Texas) =

Historic Episcopal church in Austin, Texas

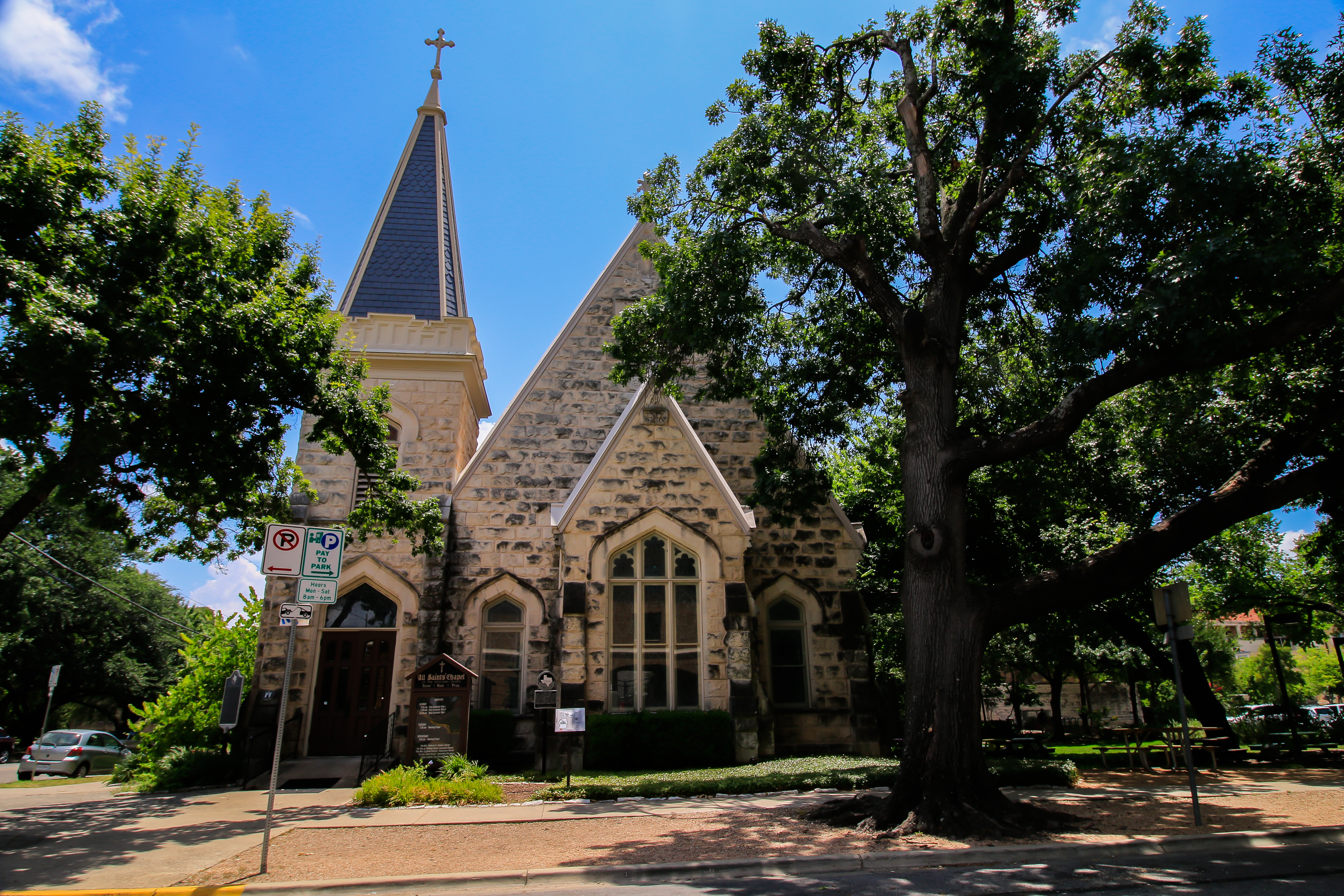
- West elevation and main entrance

- Location within Texas Location within the United States
- 30°17′30″N 97°44′23″W
- Address: 209 W 27th St. Austin, Texas 78705
- Country: United States
- Denomination: Episcopal
- Website: www.allsaints-austin.org

History
- Consecrated: 8 May 1901

Architecture
- Architect(s): A. O. Watson; Marvin Eickenroht
- Architectural type: Gothic Revival
- Years built: 1899–1900

Administration
- Province: VII
- Diocese: Texas
- All Saints' Chapel
- U.S. National Register of Historic Places
- Recorded Texas Historic Landmark
- Area: Less than 1 acre (0.40 ha)
- NRHP reference No.: 15000543
- RTHL No.: 17873

Significant dates
- Added to NRHP: August 24, 2015
- Designated RTHL: 2013

All Saints' Episcopal Church (also known as All Saints' Chapel) is a historic Episcopal parish church in Austin, Texas, United States. Built in 1899 on the edge of the University of Texas at Austin campus, the church has long-standing connections with the university's student body and faculty. The chapel was a project of Episcopal Bishop George Herbert Kinsolving, whose crypt is located under the church. It has been designated as a City of Austin Historic Landmark since 1980 and a Recorded Texas Historic Landmark since 2014, and it was listed on the National Register of Historic Places in 2015.

== History ==
In 1893, Bishop George Herbert Kinsolving of the Episcopal Diocese of Texas proposed that the Episcopal Church ought to establish a residence and chapel for female students at the University of Texas at Austin, which had opened ten years earlier. Students were initially housed within Kinsolving's home adjacent to campus, and then a residence building, called the Church Institute for Young Ladies, was completed in 1897; this building, which would later come to be known as "Grace Hall" (after Kinsolving's wife, Grace Jaggar Kinsolving), was the first women's residence at the University of Texas, preceding the first women's dormitory owned by the university, which opened in 1903.

Soon after the opening of Grace Hall, work began on an accompanying chapel for the use of the resident students. The cornerstone was laid on June 17, 1899, the first service was held on November 8, 1900, and the structure was consecrated and dedicated as All Saints' Chapel on May 8, 1901. Though originally intended for the use of the female students living in Grace Hall, the chapel soon attracted other Episcopalians living in the neighborhood, including numerous UT professors. All Saints' was recognized as a mission of the diocese on May 15, 1903, and elevated to the status of an independent parish on May 13, 1909.

In 1939 the chapel's chancel was expanded to the east to enlarge the sanctuary and add new rooms. This also allowed Kinsolving, who had died in 1928, to be reinterred under the altar in 1940; his crypt under the chapel was designated as a Texas Historic Cemetery in 2015. Today, the chapel is surrounded on three sides by university buildings: a parking garage to the east, a dormitory hall to the west, and, to the south, on the site of Kinsolving's former home, the Kinsolving Residence Hall, named in recognition of his role in establishing residential space for female university students. The church was designated as a City of Austin Historic Landmark in 1980, as well as a Recorded Texas Historic Landmark in 2014. It was listed to the National Register of Historic Places on August 24, 2015, in recognition of the church's religious architecture and its historical importance to the university and the Episcopal Church in Texas.

== Architecture ==
The All Saints' Episcopal Church sanctuary building exhibits traditional cruciform Christian church architecture, with a nave, transept and chancel oriented west-to-east. A square, steepled two-story bell tower is offset from the main axis at the northwest corner. The exterior walls are of rusticated ashlar masonry of gray limestone, laid 18 inches (46 cm) thick, with contrasting smooth-faced stone around doors, windows, and other accents; the tower and nave are roofed in slate. The building is designed in a Gothic Revival style, with shallow buttresses, steep gables, and tall lancet windows. The original architect was A. O. Watson, and the 1939 expansion was designed by Marvin Eickenroht in the same style.

=== Exterior ===
The main façade is on the west, with the entry narthex in the base of the tower at the northwest corner, featuring wood-paneled glass doors set in a Gothic arch doorway. A gabled segment projecting forward from the wall, housing the baptistry, features a triple lancet stained glass window. The projection is flanked by another lancet window on either side in the main wall, and above it is a louvered double-lancet opening to ventilate the attic. At the top of the main wall is a recessed cross set into the masonry and surmounted by a trefoil. The rooflines of all the gable ends are topped by parapets capped with metal finials.

The other elevations include additional lancet windows and buttresses on the outside corners. The original portion of the sanctuary building is one story high, but the 1939 expansion extended the chancel to the east to include a second level below, accommodated by the downward slope of the land. The windows on the south face are glazed with amber and green diamond panes from the original construction, and the rest have been replaced with stained glass panels, most fabricated by Willet Stained Glass Studios of Philadelphia.

=== Interior ===
The interior of the sanctuary has oak floors, painted plaster walls with painted beaded board wainscots, and a ribbed barrel vault ceiling of painted beaded board. Seventeen rows of wooden pews fill the nave, with carpeted center and side aisles running through them. The chancel includes choir pews and features a pipe organ made by Casavant Frères of Quebec. The altar rail, bishop's chair and baptismal font are all gifts from the Church of the Epiphany in Philadelphia, where Kinsolving was rector before coming to Texas. The sub-level beneath the chancel contains Kinsolving's crypt, where his remains were moved from Oakwood Cemetery after the chapel's expansion.

== See also ==
- National Register of Historic Places listings in Travis County, Texas
- Recorded Texas Historic Landmarks in Travis County
