= J. Thomas Heistand =

American bishop

The Right Reverend John Thomas Heistand D.D.
- Bishop of Harrisburg
- Church: Episcopal Church
- Diocese: Harrisburg
- Elected: May 25, 1943
- In office: 1943–1966
- Predecessor: Hunter Wyatt-Brown
- Successor: Dean T. Stevenson

Orders
- Ordination: December 1922 by James Henry Darlington
- Consecration: September 15, 1943 by Henry Tucker

Personal details
- Born: November 10, 1894 Lancaster, Pennsylvania, United States
- Died: November 8, 1979 (aged 84) Harrisburg, Pennsylvania, United States
- Buried: Eagles Mere Cemetery, Eagles Mere
- Denomination: Anglican
- Parents: Oliver Howard Heistand & Ethel Grant Ferrier
- Spouse: Alta Streit Hertzler
- Children: 4

John Thomas Heistand (November 10, 1894 – November 8, 1979) was bishop of the Episcopal Diocese of Central Pennsylvania (formerly Harrisburg), serving from 1943 to 1966.

== Early life and education ==
Heistand was born on November 10, 1894, in Lancaster, Pennsylvania, the son of Oliver Howard Heistand and Ethel Grant Ferrier. He was baptized and confirmed in St John's Church in Lancaster. He also attended the public schools of Lancaster and later the Yeates Preparatory School where he studied business. During WWI he served as a private in the Canadian Army until the United States joined the war and he transferred to the US Army. After the war he finished his studies at Columbia University and commenced training for the ordained ministry at the General Theological Seminary.

== Priest ==
In 1922, Heistand was ordained deacon and priest by Bishop James Henry Darlington of Harrisburg. He served as rector of Ascension Church in Kulpmont, Pennsylvania. Later he became chaplain at Bucknell University and then vicar of Christ Church in Milton, Pennsylvania. Later he served as rector of St Paul's Church in Bloomsburg, Pennsylvania. In May 1934 he was appointed Dean of St Stephen's Cathedral in Harrisburg, Pennsylvania.

== Bishop ==
Heistand was elected Coadjutor Bishop of Harrisburg on May 25, 1943, during the 39th General Convention after the third ballot. He was consecrated on September 15, 1943, with Presiding Bishop Tucker as chief consecrator in St Stephen's Cathedral. He succeeded as diocesan bishop of Harrisburg on October 4, 1943, upon the resignation of Bishop Wyatt-Brown. His episcopacy is remembered for his work in raising clergy salaries and living conditions while encouraging congregations to meet their financial responsibilities. He was also influential in creating four new congregations while five other acquired the right to have a full-time priest. Heistand retired in 1966. He died on November 8, 1979, in Harrisburg, Pennsylvania after a long illness.

== Family ==
Heistand married Alta Hertzler and together had four children, two of whom were ordained and one, Joseph T. Heistand, became Bishop of Arizona.
