= Walter Mitchell (bishop) =

Episcopal Bishop of Arizona (1876–1971)

The Right Reverend Walter Mitchell D.D., S.T.D.
- Missionary Bishop of Arizona
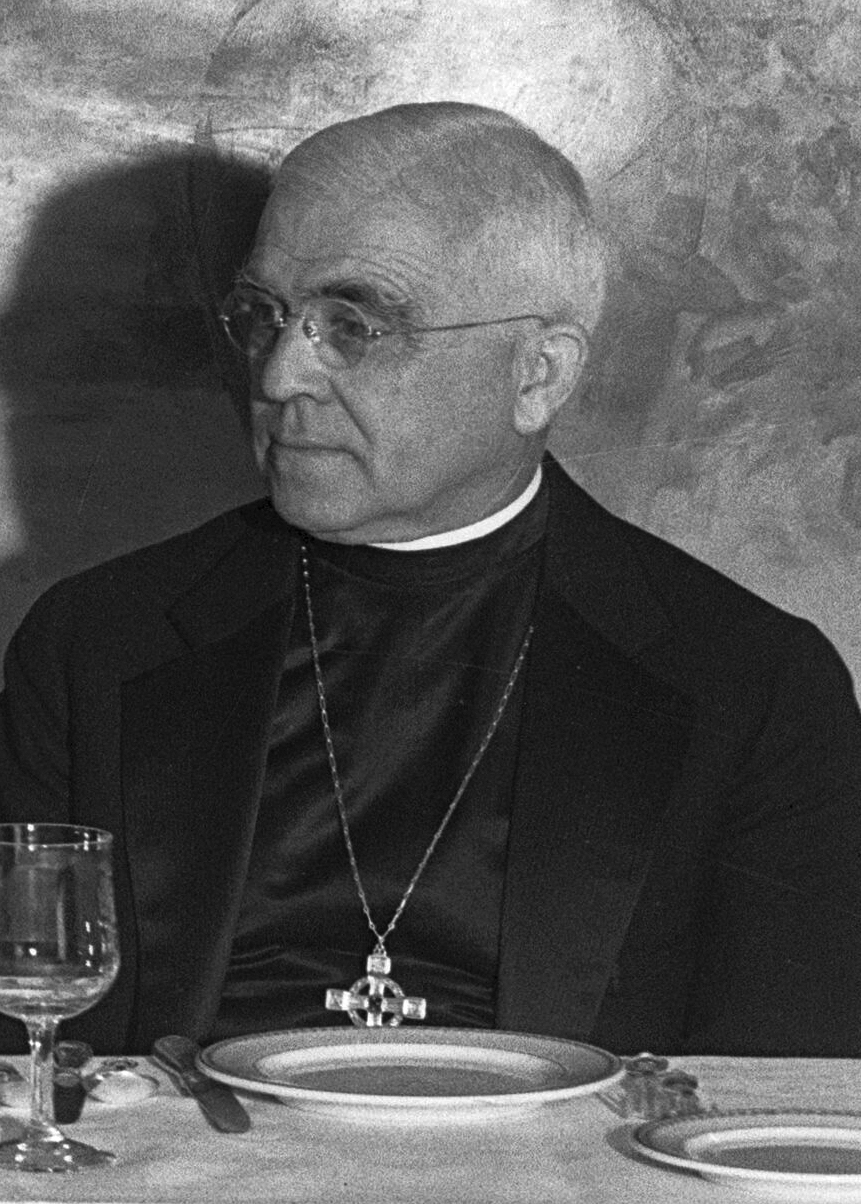
- Church: Episcopal Church
- Diocese: Arizona
- In office: 1926–1945
- Predecessor: Julius W. Atwood
- Successor: Arthur B. Kinsolving

Orders
- Ordination: June 28, 1903 by Daniel S. Tuttle
- Consecration: January 5, 1926 by John Gardner Murray

Personal details
- Born: September 13, 1876 Hartville, Missouri, United States
- Died: May 27, 1971 (aged 94) Rancho Santa Fe, California, United States
- Buried: Trinity Cathedral (Phoenix, Arizona)
- Denomination: Anglican
- Parents: Ewing Young Mitchell & Amanda Corinne Medley
- Spouse: Susan Glass Baker; Elsie R. Carver
- Children: 2

Walter Mitchell (September 13, 1876 – May 27, 1971) was the Bishop of Arizona in The Episcopal Church in the United States from 1926 until 1946.

== Early life and education ==
Mitchell was born on September 13, 1876, in Hartville, Missouri, United States, the son of Ewing Young Mitchell and Amanda Corinne Medley. He was educated at the Missouri public school and later at the Missouri School of Mines and Metallurgy. He received his Bachelor of Arts from Washington University in St. Louis and later enrolled to study theology at General Theological Seminary and at Sewanee: The University of the South from where he graduated with a Bachelor of Divinity in 1902. In 1914, the University of the South awarded him with a Doctor of Divinity while in 1926 he was awarded a Doctor of Sacred Theology by General Theological Seminary.

== Ordained ministry ==
Mitchell was ordained deacon on June 24, 1902, by Thomas F. Gailor, Bishop of Tennessee and served as Deacon-in-charge of St Jude's Church in Monroe City, Missouri. He was ordained priest on June 28, 1903, by the Bishop of Missouri, and as from 1903 Presiding Bishop, Daniel S. Tuttle, in the chapel of the University of the South. Between 1903 and 1904 he served as Acting Chaplain and Assistant Headmaster of the Sewanee Grammar School. He was rector of the Church of St John the Baptist in San Juan, Puerto Rico between 1904 till 1906. In 1908 he became the director of Fairmount School in Monteagle, Tennessee. He also subsequently served as rector of the Porter Military Academy in Charleston, South Carolina. In 1924 he became Executive secretary of the field department work of the Diocese of New Jersey.

== Episcopacy ==
In 1925 Mitchell was elected Missionary Bishop of Arizona and was consecrated in Christ Church Pro-Cathedral in Trenton, New Jersey on January 5, 1926, by Presiding Bishop John Gardner Murray. On August 18, 1931, Bishop Mitchell bought the Arizona Church Conference Center. He retained the post till 1945 after which he resigned. He died on May 27, 1971, in Rancho Santa Fe, California.

== Family ==
Mitchell married Susan Glass Baker on June 3, 1902, and together had two children. After Susan's death in 1935 he married Elsie R. Carver on June 28, 1938. His brother was Richard Bland Mitchell who was Bishop of Arkansas from 1938 till 1956.
