= Joseph Harte =

American bishop (1914–1999)

The Right Reverend John Joseph Meakin Harte D.D.
- Bishop of Arizona
- Church: Episcopal Church
- Diocese: Arizona
- Elected: May 9, 1962
- In office: 1962–1979
- Predecessor: Arthur B. Kinsolving
- Successor: Joseph T. Heistand
- Previous post: Suffragan Bishop of Dallas (1954-1962)

Orders
- Ordination: December 1939 by Thomas Casady
- Consecration: June 29, 1954 by Frank Burrill

Personal details
- Born: July 28, 1914 Springfield, Ohio, United States
- Died: December 19, 1999 (aged 85) Phoenix, Arizona, United States
- Buried: Trinity Cathedral (Phoenix, Arizona)
- Denomination: Anglican
- Spouse: Alice Eleanor Taylor
- Children: 3

John Joseph Meakin Harte (July 28, 1914 – December 19, 1999) was an American Episcopal Bishop. The second bishop of the Episcopal Diocese of Arizona, Harte was consecrated in 1954 and served as bishop from 1962 to 1978.

== Early life ==
Joseph Harte was a graduate of Springfield High School in his hometown of Springfield, Ohio. Harte went on to graduate at Washington and Jefferson College and the General Theological Seminary, New York. After graduation, Harte was ordained at the Cathedral of St. John the Divine in New York City. After proposing to Alice Taylor on their first date, the two were married on October 14, 1941.

== Ministry ==
Harte was awarded the Brotherhood Award from the National Conference of Christians and Jews for his work in the prevention of riots in Arizona in the 1960s and 1970s. He served as the bishop of the Episcopal Diocese of Arizona from 1962 to 1978. He was the founder of the anti-abortion organization Episcopalians for Life in 1967. He served on the Standing Liturgical Commission of the Episcopal Church during the preparation of the 1979 Book of Common Prayer.

Harte was preceded by Arthur Barksdale Kinsolving II and was succeeded by the Right Reverend Joseph T. Heistand.
