= Kirk Smith =

Kirk Smith may refer to:

- Kirk R. Smith (1947-2020), American climatologist
- Kirk Stevan Smith (born 1951), former bishop of the Episcopal Diocese of Arizona
- Kirk W. Smith, United States Air Force officer
