= Asa Rogers (Virginia) =

American politician (1802–1887)

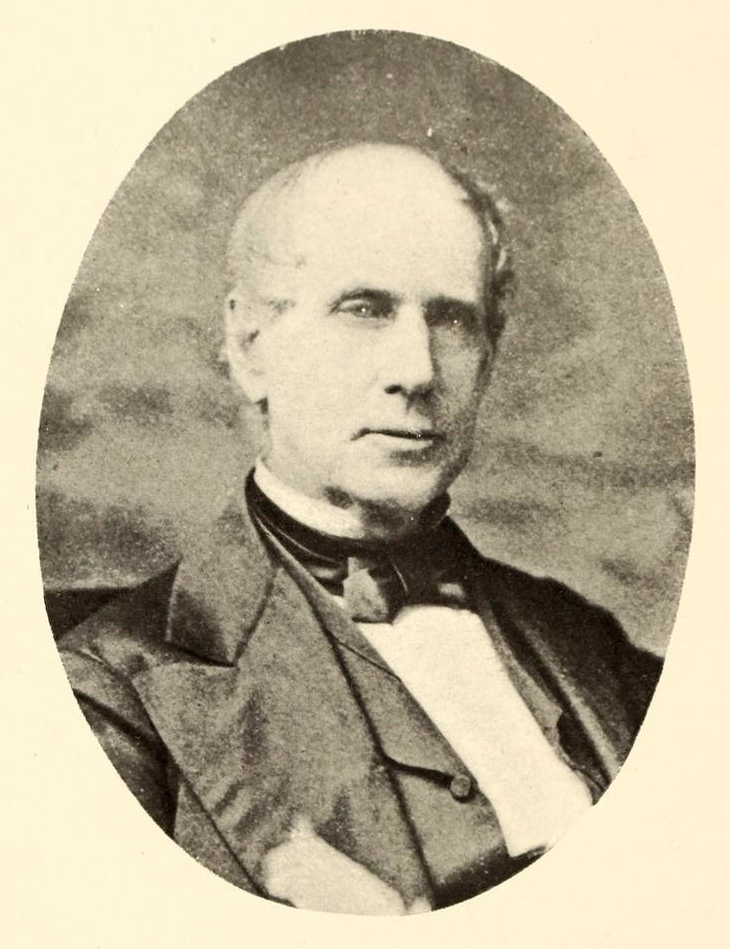

Member of the Virginia Senate from the Loudoun, Fairfax Counties and Alexandria district
- In office December 3, 1849 – December 1, 1850
- Preceded by: n/a
- Succeeded by: Henry W. Thomas

Member of the U.S. House of Representatives from 's Loudoun and Fairfax Counties district
- In office December 5, 1842 – December 2, 1849
- Preceded by: James McIlhaney
- Succeeded by: n/a

Member of the Virginia House of Delegates from the Loudoun district
- In office December 4, 1826 – November 30, 1828 Serving with James McIlhaney, Thornton Walker
- Preceded by: Humphrey B. Powell
- Succeeded by: William Ellzey

Personal details
- Born: January 14, 1826 Stone Hill plantation, Loudoun County, Virginia, US
- Died: September 1, 1887 (aged 85) Middleburg, Loudoun County, Virginia, US
- Education: University of Virginia
- Profession: planter, merchant, politician

Military service
- Allegiance: Virginia; Confederate States

Asa Rogers (June 4, 1802 – September 1, 1887) was a Virginia farmer, lawyer, merchant and politician who represented Loudoun County, Virginia in both houses of the Virginia General Assembly before the American Civil War, during which he became a Confederate officer and helped create Mosby's Raiders, and after which he lived in Middleburg.

== Early life and education ==
Born at Stone Hill plantation about a mile east of the county seat to Hugh Rogers and his wife, the former Mary Coombs, he was one of eleven children, seven of whom survived to adulthood. Rogers received a private education appropriate to his class and graduated from the University of Virginia.

== Career ==
After admission to the Virginia bar, Rogers practiced law, as well as operated his own plantation using enslaved labor.

Rogers also operated a store at Madison and Washington Streets (which remains today as a contributing property to the Middleburg Historic District). Middleburg had prospered from its location on a major wagon route from Alexandria, Virginia and Washington, D.C. westward into Winchester, Virginia and the Shenandoah Valley (later U.S. Route 50) as well as its proximity to a major north-south route through Virginia's Piedmont region and northward into Maryland (later U.S. Route 15). In 1836, the Baltimore and Ohio Railroad was completed, and by the 1840s, the wagon route trade had diminished significantly, to the detriment of merchants such as Asa Rogers.

In 1826 Loudoun County voters elected Rogers as one of their representatives in the Virginia House of Delegates, and re-elected him once, so he served from 1826 until 1828. In 1842, Loudoun and Fairfax County voters elected Rogers to the Virginia Senate, and re-elected him until the year after the Virginia Constitutional Convention of 1850, when the entire Senate was redistricted. In the final year of his term, his district had expanded to include Alexandria, which had been retroceded from the District of Columbia. Rogers unsuccessfully ran to become one of Loudoun County's representatives to the Virginia Secession Convention, polling 1,103 votes but losing to popular Quaker John Janney as well as John A. Carter (who polled 1,945 and 1,411 votes respectively and had previously represented the county at the 1850 Constitutional Convention), but outpolling secessionist John R. Carter of Philomont (who only received 269 votes).

After his legislative service, Rogers had served as one of the county's justices of the peace with fellow slaveowners Hamilton Rogers and John A. Carter, as well as Thomas S. Ellzey, who did not own slaves. In 1850, Hamilton Rogers owned 25 enslaved people, Asa Rogers 17, and John A. Carter 32. Asa Rogers also served on the vestry of Emmanuel Episcopal Church in Middleburg.

=== Civil War ===
When Virginia seceded from the Union on April 10, 1861 as the American Civil War began, Rogers and his brother Hamilton Rogers enlisted in the local militia, as did four sons of each man. Asa Rogers Sr. was commissioned as a Brigadier General on April 27, his brother Hamilton as a Colonel, and Asa's son Arthur Lee Rogers was commissioned as a Major in the Artillery. All 115 of Middleburg's eligible voters unanimously to secede from the Union. Asa Rogers Senior was captured twice (on February 24, 1862 and July 16, 1862) and exchanged each time. His son Arthur (1831-1871) was sent home as disabled, where he designed a flag for the Confederate States of America which incorporated the Confederate Battle Flag.

Mosby's Rangers were formed at Hamilton Rogers' Oakham Farm in December 1862, and several cavalry battles were fought around the area in July 1863, after the Battle of the Wilderness to the south, and both before and after the Battle of Gettysburg further up Route 15 in Pennsylvania. General U.S. Grant in December 1864 authorized a burning raid around Middleburg in retaliation for the damage Mosby's Rangers continued to inflict behind Union lines despite the Confederate Army's decisive loss at the Third Battle of Winchester in September and General Sheridan's march down the Shenandoah Valley.

In 1864, General Grant ordered dozens of Loudoun citizens, including Rogers, arrested and imprisoned, supposedly because they were subject to Confederate conscription. Prominent Quaker Samuel Janney worked to release those civilians, and those whom he testified were Union supporters were released. Rogers was among 32 arrested and imprisoned in Washington D.C. in an attempt that Confederate authorities would free 26 Pennsylvania residents similarly carried off during the Gettysburg campaign. Rogers refused to take the oath to be paroled, stating that he had a son and nephews in the Confederate army and if they came to his house, he would even attempt to prevent Union forces from capturing them.

=== Postwar ===
After the Civil War freed enslaved African Americans, the plantation economy collapsed. The Rogers led opposition to Reconstruction efforts and attempted to maintain both their economic and social status. Middleburg was able to secure its own charter as a town in 1872 as some prosperity returned, but the following year the Panic of 1873 struck. Reconstruction ended when President Rutherford B. Hayes took office in 1877. By 1880, Middleburg remained the county seat, but was no longer the second largest town in the county, but the third—and the decline continued until the century closed, when the old-line families still remembering the pre-Civil War prosperity began an uneasy alliance with former Northerners with equestrian interests. Both Rogers brothers had mortgages on their six large estates (Stone Hill, Mill Hill, Texas Farm, Oakham Farm, Dover, Ellendale, and Clifton), and Dover especially (owned by their brother William, who had been accused of fraud and self-dealing at the expense of the widow Hixon as early as the 1840s) was subject to lawsuits. They were all foreclosed upon in the mid-1870s, but family members were able to buy back three.

== Death and legacy ==
Asa Rogers died in Middleburg, Virginia in 1887. He was buried in Middleburg's Sharon Cemetery.

His wife Ellen's letters are in the University of Virginia's special collection. Their daughter Lucy Lee Rogers (1833-1862) married the widowed rector of Emmanuel Episcopal Church, Ovid Americus Kinsolving (1822-1894, whom Union forces imprisoned for treason), and two of their sons became Episcopal priests—Rev. Arthur Barksdale Kinsolving (1861-1961)(also known as an author and historian in Maryland) and Rev. Lucian Lee Kinsolving (1862-1929)--as did their half-brothers George Herbert Kinsolving (1849-1928) and Wythe Leigh Kinsolving (1878-1964).
