= Lester Kinsolving =

American talk radio host (1927–2018)

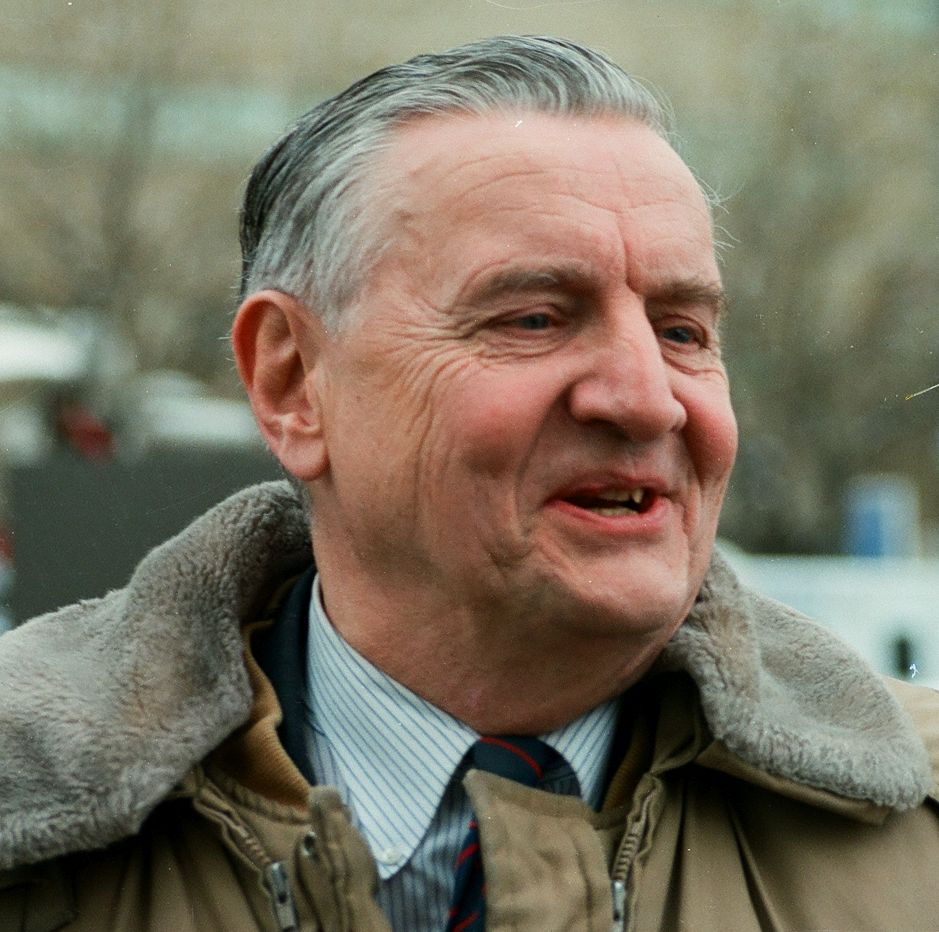
- Kinsolving in 2002
- Born: December 18, 1927; New York City
- Died: December 4, 2018 (aged 90); Vienna, Virginia
- Father: Arthur B. Kinsolving
- Relatives: Lucien Lee Kinsolving (grandfather)

Charles Lester Kinsolving (December 18, 1927 – December 4, 2018) was an American conservative political Episcopal priest, newspaper columnist, and talk radio host. He was known for his pesky questions during the White House briefings.

== Early life and education ==
Kinsolving was born in New York City to Arthur B. Kinsolving and Edith Lester, oldest of his three brothers. He attended the Episcopal High School in Alexandria, Virginia. He joined the Army during World War II at age 17 and worked in advertising and public relations. He graduated from the Church Divinity School of the Pacific in Berkeley, California and was ordained in 1955. James Pike was one of his mentors.

Kinsolving had numerous relatives in Episcopal Church leadership. His great-grandfather, Ovid Americus Kinsolving, was a Virginia pastor and a spy for the Confederacy. His grandfather, Lucien Lee Kinsolving, was a missionary bishop in Brazil and his father, was chaplain at West Point as well as the Bishop of Arizona.

== Career ==
Kinsolving served as chaplain at San Quentin Prison in California and at parishes in several states. In 1957, he was denounced and defrocked by the Episcopal church for his sermons. Kinsolving once marched in Selma with Martin Luther King Jr., but his views hardened into "knee-jerk conservatism" over time, with a few notable exceptions: He opposed the death penalty and was a staunch supporter of abortion rights.

In 1966, he began writing a religion column for the San Francisco Chronicle. By the 1970s, Kinsolving's column on religious matters was widely syndicated. Based at the San Francisco Examiner, he began an exposé on the Peoples Temple which was discontinued when the followers of Jim Jones responded by protesting and threatening lawsuits.

Kinsolving had a minor role as Confederate General William Barksdale in a couple of films: Gettysburg and Gods and Generals.

He hosted a radio show on WCBM in Baltimore, Maryland.

=== Views on gay rights ===
Kinsolving was an outspoken opponent of gay rights organizations – "the sodomy lobby," as he referred to them – mainly because of his religious beliefs.

He is known for being the first White House correspondent to ask questions about the HIV/AIDS epidemic during the Reagan administration; he continued to ask questions about the disease even though press secretary Larry Speakes and some other correspondents made light of it; Speakes joked that Kinsolving had an "abiding interest in the disease" because he was "a fairy". Kinsolving first asked questions about AIDS in 1982; President Reagan would not acknowledge the epidemic until 1985, after reelection, by which time more than five thousand people had died from the disease in the United States.

== Death ==
Kinsolving died on December 4, 2018, at his home in Vienna, Virginia.

== Filmography ==
Year	Title	Role	Notes
1993	Gettysburg	Brig. Gen. William Barksdale	
2003	Gods and Generals	Brig. Gen. William Barksdale	(final film role)
