= Julius W. Atwood =

Missionary bishop (1857–1945)

The Right Reverend Julius Walter Atwood D.D.
- Missionary Bishop of Arizona
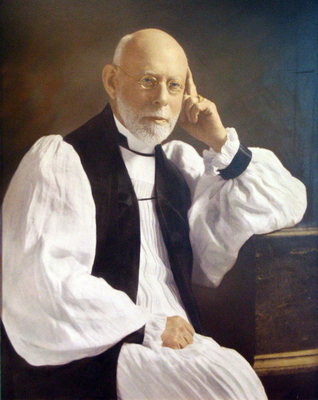
- Church: Episcopal Church
- Diocese: Arizona
- Elected: 1910
- In office: 1911–1925
- Predecessor: John Mills Kendrick
- Successor: Walter Mitchell

Orders
- Ordination: May 22, 1883 by Benjamin Henry Paddock
- Consecration: January 18, 1911 by William Lawrence

Personal details
- Born: June 27, 1857 Salisbury, Vermont, United States
- Died: April 10, 1945 (aged 87) Washington D.C., United States
- Denomination: Anglican
- Parents: Frank Carley Atwood & Sarah Thomas
- Spouse: Anna Richmond
- Children: 1

Julius Walter Atwood (June 27, 1857 – April 10, 1945) was missionary bishop of the Episcopal Diocese of Arizona from 1911 to 1925. Note that the Diocese of Arizona was the Missionary District of Arizona until 1959.

== Early life and education ==
Atwood was born on June 27, 1857, in Salisbury, Vermont, son of Frank Carley Atwood and Sarah Thomas. He was educated at the public schools and then later at Middlebury College from where he received his Bachelor of Arts in 1878. Later he studied at the General Theological Seminary for two years but continued his studies at the Episcopal Theological School in Cambridge, Massachusetts. He graduated with a Bachelor of Divinity in 1882 and received a Master of Arts from Middlebury College that same year.

== Ordination and career ==
Atwood was ordained deacon in 1882 and priest the following year by Bishop Benjamin Henry Paddock of Massachusetts. He served as rector of the Church of the Ascension in Ipswich, Massachusetts between 1882 and 1887. Later he became rector of St John's Church in Providence, Rhode Island and in 1894 he became rector of Trinity Church in Columbus, Ohio. From 1906 till 1911 he served as rector of Trinity Church in Phoenix, Arizona. He was also the Archdeacon of Arizona from 1907 till 1911. In 1910 he also served as deputy to the General Convention.

== Bishop ==
Atwood was elected Missionary Bishop of Arizona in 1910 and was consecrated on January 18, 1911, by Bishop William Lawrence of Massachusetts. He retained the post till 1925 when he resigned as missionary bishop. Later he served as Assistant Bishop in Pennsylvania, Massachusetts, Western Massachusetts and Connecticut. Bishop Atwood was also the author of numerous works and a lecturer of Church History at Kenyon College and Sewanee: The University of the South. He died on April 10, 1945, in Washington D.C.

He died two days before his friend, President Franklin D. Roosevelt, whom Vice-President Harry S Truman expected to attend his funeral.

== Family ==
Atwood married Anna Richmond in 1895 and together they had two daughters, Ellen and Betty Atwood.
