= Joseph T. Heistand =

Bishop of the Episcopal Diocese of Arizona (1924–2008)

The Right Reverend Joseph Thomas Heistand
- Bishop of Arizona
- Church: Episcopal Church
- Diocese: Arizona
- In office: 1979–1992
- Predecessor: Joseph Harte
- Successor: Robert R. Shahan
- Previous post: Coadjutor Bishop of Arizona (1976–1979)

Orders
- Ordination: December 9, 1953 by John Thomas Heistand
- Consecration: August 28, 1976 by John Allin

Personal details
- Born: March 3, 1924 Danville, Pennsylvania, United States
- Died: October 14, 2008 (aged 84) Richmond, Virginia, United States
- Buried: Eagles Mere Cemetery, Eagles Mere, Pennsylvania
- Denomination: Anglican
- Parents: John Thomas Heistand & Alta Hertzler
- Spouse: Roberta C. Lush
- Children: 3

Joseph Thomas Heistand (March 3, 1924 – October 14, 2008) was a WWII Veteran who served as the Bishop of the Episcopal Diocese of Arizona from 1979 to 1992.

== Early life ==
Heistand was born on March 3, 1924, in Danville, Pennsylvania, the son of the Reverend John Thomas Heistand, who later became Bishop of Harrisburg and Alta Hertzler. He studied at Trinity College in Hartford, Connecticut but in 1943, he left and enlisted in the U.S. Army.

== Military service ==
Heistand served in the 29th Field Artillery, Third Infantry Division. During the Italian Campaign, he was awarded the Bronze Star for valorous conduct at the Battle of Anzio. He was also awarded the Purple Heart, the Oak Leaf Cluster, and the Croix de Guerre for his combat in France.

== Education ==
Upon his return, he finished his studies at Trinity College and graduated with a bachelor's degree in economics. In 1948, he was briefly employed by the International Harvester Company but a year later, he commenced studies at Virginia Theological Seminary where he graduated in 1952.

== Ordained ministry ==
Heistand was made deacon in June 1952 and ordained as a priest on December 9, 1953, by his father in Trinity Church, Tyrone, Pennsylvania. His first post was as deacon-in-charge, and then rector of Trinity Church in Tyrone, Pennsylvania. In 1955, he became senior assistant, and then rector of St Paul's Church in Richmond, Virginia. Whilst at St Paul's, he was involved in the city's racial integration program and founded the Oral School for Deaf Children and the Adult Center for the Physically Handicapped. Between 1969 and 1976, he served as rector of St Philip's in-the-Hills Church in Tucson, Arizona.

== Episcopacy ==
Heistand was elected Coadjutor Bishop of Arizona in 1976 and was consecrated on August 28, 1976, by Presiding Bishop John Allin, and co-consecrated by his father J. Thomas Heistand and Robert Bruce Hall, Bishop of Virginia. He succeeded as diocesan bishop in 1979. During his time as bishop in Arizona, Heistand presided over the first ordination of a woman in the diocese. He retired in 1992. He died on October 14, 2008, in Richmond, Virginia.

== Family ==
Heistand married Roberta C. Lush in 1951 and together they had three children.
