= Jennifer A. Reddall =

American Episcopal bishop (born 1975)

The Right Reverend Jennifer Anne Reddall
- Bishop of Arizona
- Church: Episcopal Church
- Diocese: Arizona
- Elected: October 20, 2018
- In office: 2019–present
- Predecessor: Kirk Stevan Smith

Orders
- Ordination: January 11, 2003 by J. Jon Bruno
- Consecration: March 9, 2019 by Michael Curry

Personal details
- Born: July 21, 1975 (age 50) Redondo Beach, California, United States
- Denomination: Anglican
- Children: 1

Jennifer Anne Reddall (born July 21, 1975) is an American prelate who is the sixth and current bishop of Arizona.

== Early life and education ==
Reddall was born on July 21, 1975, in Redondo Beach, California, and grew up in the Episcopal Church. Reddall began discerning a calling to ordained ministry in high school, where she served as a student leader in her youth group. In 1997 Reddall was graduated from Yale College with a Bachelor of Arts in Theater Studies. After graduation Reddall served as an Intern in the Episcopal Urban Intern Program in Inglewood, California. From 1998 to 1999 she served as a Special Education Teacher in Pasadena, California.

== Ordination ==
Reddall studied for holy orders at the General Theological Seminary, including a summer study at St Andrew's Theological Seminary, Mexico City. She was ordained a deacon in 2002, and ordained a priest in 2003, through the auspices of her home diocese of Los Angeles. Reddall's first ordained ministry position was as Curate for Church of the Epiphany, Agoura Hills, California. In 2003 she moved to Manhattan to serve as Associate Rector of Church of the Epiphany, New York, New York. Following the retirement of the Rector, the Rev. Andrew Mullins, in 2011, Reddall was called to serve as the Priest-in-Charge of Epiphany. In 2014 Reddall was called to serve as the Rector there. Reddall served the Diocese of New York as a Trustee, and served as a member of the House of Deputies Special Task Force on Sexual Harassment and Exploitation, subcommittee for Truth and Reconciliation.

== Bishop ==
On October 20, 2018, she was elected Bishop of Arizona, the sixth bishop after the establishment of the diocese in 1959, and the first woman to serve in that role. She was consecrated on March 9, 2019, with Presiding Bishop Michael Curry as chief consecrator. She was seated at Trinity Cathedral on April 7, 2019. At the time of her consecration she was the youngest bishop in the Episcopal Church.

== Personal life ==
Reddall married Jonathan Linman, a Lutheran minister, in 2003; they had one son, Nathan, in 2009. In 2014, they divorced. Reddall's parents have lived in Tucson since 2016.

== See also ==
- List of Episcopal bishops of the United States
- Historical list of the Episcopal bishops of the United States
