= Hunter Wyatt-Brown =

American Episcopalian bishop

The Right Reverend Hunter Wyatt-Brown D.D., LL.D., L.H.D
- Bishop of Harrisburg
- Church: Episcopal Church
- Diocese: Harrisburg
- Elected: January 28, 1931
- In office: 1931–1943
- Predecessor: James Henry Darlington
- Successor: J. Thomas Heistand

Orders
- Ordination: April 4, 1909 by Charles Minnigerode Beckwith
- Consecration: May 1, 1931 by James De Wolf Perry

Personal details
- Born: February 14, 1884 Eufaula, Alabama, United States
- Died: April 24, 1952 (aged 68) Sewanee, Tennessee, United States
- Buried: University of the South Cemetery, Sewanee
- Denomination: Anglican
- Parents: Eugene L. Brown & Serena Hoole
- Spouse: Laura Little
- Children: Bertram Wyatt-Brown

Hunter Wyatt-Brown (February 14, 1884 – April 24, 1952), born Wyatt Hunter Brown, was the bishop of the Episcopal Diocese of Harrisburg (Central Pennsylvania).

== Early life and education ==
Wyatt-Brown was born in Eufaula, Alabama on February 14, 1884, the son of Eugene L. Brown and Serena Hoole. In 1941 he legally changed his name from Wyatt Hunter Brown to Hunter Wyatt-Brown. He studied at the Sewanee: The University of the South from where he graduated with a Bachelor of Arts in 1905 and with a Bachelor of Divinity in 1908. He also graduated with a Doctor of Humane Letters from the University of Alabama in 1915. He was awarded a Doctor of Divinity from St John's College in 1921 and Sewanee: The University of the South in 1933. He also earned a Doctor of Laws from Dickinson College in 1933.

== Ordained ministry ==
Wyatt-Brown was made deacon in May 1908 and served as assistant at St John's Church in Montgomery, Alabama. On April 4, 1909 he was ordained priest by Bishop Charles Minnigerode Beckwith of Alabama and subsequently became rector of All Saints’ Church in Mobile, Alabama. In 1913 he became rector of Trinity Church in Asheville, North Carolina and in 1915 rector of Ascension Church in Pittsburgh. From 1920 till 1928 he served as rector of Church of St Michael and All Angels in Baltimore. In 1927 he also became a lecturer on Pastoral Theology at the Virginia Theological Seminary. In 1928 he was appointed Dean of St Paul's Cathedral in Buffalo, New York.

== Episcopacy ==
Wyatt-Brown was elected to succeed Bishop James Henry Darlington as Bishop of Harrisburg on January 28, 1931. He was consecrated on May 1, 1931 with Presiding Bishop James De Wolf Perry as chief consecrator in St. Stephen's Cathedral in Harrisburg, Pennsylvania. He retired as Bishop of Harrisburg in 1943. He moved to Sewanee, Tennessee where he remained till his death on April 25, 1952.

== Family ==
Wyatt-Brown married Laura Little on September 5, 1911. His older sons the Rev. Hunter Wyatt-Brown, Jr., and the Rev. Charles Wyatt-Brown were also ordained. His daughter Laura lived in England. His youngest son Bertram Wyatt-Brown was a noted historian of the South.
