= William M. M. Thomas =

American bishop (1878–1951)

William Matthew Merrick Thomas (May 3, 1878 – September 18, 1951) was an American missionary bishop of the diocese which eventually became the Anglican Episcopal Church of Brazil.

== Early and family life ==
William was born at Mattapany, the historic plantation of colonial Maryland governor Charles Calvert in St. Mary's County, Maryland to former Confederate Captain George Thomas (1836-1903) and his wife Ellen Ogle Beall(1842-1909) His mother was the daughter of the late Rev. Upton Beall and greatgranddaughter of former Maryland governor Benjamin Ogle. They met while Capt. Thomas was recovering at a Richmond, Virginia hospital from wounds received at Culp's Hill during the Battle of Gettysburg. The family included at least six children, among them: John H. Thomas (1869-1931), Rev. Upton Beall Thomas (1870-1939), Tazewell Thomas (1872-1942), and Louisa Thomas(1875-1952).

William M.M. Thomas attended the University of Virginia and graduated in 1901. He first graduated from the Virginia Theological Seminary in 1904. The same institution later awarded him a Bachelor of Divinity degree in 1911 and a Doctor of Divinity in 1925, the year of his elevation to bishop.

== Ministry ==
Thomas arrived in Brazil in 1904 after his VTS graduation and ordination as deacon. He was ordained a priest the following year. He first taught at the divinity school in Rio Grande do Sul, Brazil (1905-1910) and served as rector at the Church of Our Savior in Rio Grande (1907-1910). In 1912, he founded the Southern Cross Church School (for boys) in the state capital, Porto Alegre, and served at its headmaster (1912-1925) as well as taught various subjects at the new theological school (1921-1941).

In 1925, the Brazilian diocesan convention elected him as coadjutor to bishop Lucien Lee Kinsolving, who had announced his return to the United States for health reasons. Presiding bishop Ethelbert Talbot, bishop Joseph Blount Cheshire of North Carolina and bishop Kinsolving consecrated him. Thomas succeeded bishop Kinsolving as diocesan upon his resignation in 1928. In addition to leading the missionary diocese for more than two decades, Thomas also wrote an article about its history, published in 1942.

In 1939 Brazil's first native-born bishop, Athalício Theodoro Pithan a graduate of the Southern Cross school's first class, became his suffragan. However, his elected coadjutor in 1948 and successor upon his retirement the following year was the Wisconsin-born rector of Trinity Episcopal Church in Columbia, South Carolina and former missionary in Panama, Louis Chester Melcher.

== Death and legacy ==
Rt. Rev. William Thomas died in 1951 and is buried in the family plot in the cemetery of historic Trinity Episcopal Church in St. Mary's City, Maryland. He was survived by his wife Sara (1879-1994) and their son James W. Thomas (1908-1997).

The Brazilian Episcopal Church became an autonomous province of the international Anglican Communion in 1965. The Episcopal Church recognizes the Pioneers of the Episcopal Anglican Church of Brazil liturgically on June 7.
