= William Newton (priest) =

William Wilberforce Newton (November 4, 1843 – June 24, 1914) was an American Episcopalian divine and author.

== Life ==
Born 1843 in Philadelphia, Pennsylvania to Richard Newton and Lydia Gretorex, Newton studied at the University of Pennsylvania, graduating in 1865. In 1863 he had served in the Civil War as a private in Landis’ (Pennsylvania) Battery. He attended the Episcopal Divinity School in Philadelphia before taking up his ministry.

From 1866 to 1870 he was assistant rector at the Church of The Epiphany, Philadelphia, and from 1877 to 1882 minister at the Cathedral Church of St. Paul, Boston.

He was the pastor of St. Stephen’s Church in Pittsfield, Massachusetts from 1881 to 1900, and he was chaplain of the English Church at Dinan, Brittany from 1903 to 1904. From 1905 to 1906 he was rector at the Church of the Ascension, Wakefield, Rhode Island.

In 1890 Newton was awarded an honorary DD by his alma mater.

Newton died in Brookline, Massachusetts in 1914.
