= Robert R. Shahan =

Bishop of the Episcopal Diocese of Arizona (1939–2020)

The Right Reverend Robert Reed Shahan D.D.
- V Bishop of Arizona
- Church: Episcopal Church
- Diocese: Arizona
- Elected: May 2, 1992
- In office: 1992–2004
- Predecessor: Joseph T. Heistand
- Successor: Kirk Stevan Smith

Orders
- Ordination: November 24, 1973
- Consecration: October 3, 1992 by Edmond L. Browning

Personal details
- Born: October 18, 1939 Elkhart, Kansas, United States
- Died: August 14, 2020 (aged 80) Kansas
- Denomination: Anglican
- Parents: John and Freda (Reed) Shahan
- Spouse: Mary Carol (1963–2020)
- Children: 2

Robert Reed "Bob" Shahan (October 18, 1939 – August 14, 2020) was bishop of the Episcopal Diocese of Arizona from 1992 to 2004.

== Early life and education ==
Shahan was born on October 18, 1939, in Elkhart, Kansas, to John and Freda (Reed) Shahan. He attended the University of Kansas, earning an undergraduate degree in business in 1961. While at the university, he was an active member of the Sigma Chi fraternity and the Naval Reserve Officers Training Corps (ROTC) program. After graduation, he served as an officer in the United States Navy. During his time in the Navy, he obtained an MBA from Michigan State University.

He later pursued theological studies at Nashotah House, earning a Master of Divinity degree in 1973. Additionally, he earned a PhD in organizational development from Northwestern University in 1979.

== Ordained ministry ==
Shahan was ordained as a deacon on May 19, 1973, and as a priest on November 24, 1973. His early ministry included serving as vicar at St. Alban’s Episcopal Church in Muskegon, Michigan. From 1975 to 1981, he was a professor and Assistant Dean of Student Services at Seabury-Western Theological Seminary in Evanston, Illinois, while also serving as priest-in-charge at St. Francis Episcopal Church in Chicago.

In 1981, he was called to be Rector of St. Thaddeus Episcopal Church in Aiken, South Carolina. Three years later, in 1984, he returned to Kansas to serve as Dean of Grace Cathedral in Topeka, Kansas.

== Episcopacy ==
On May 2, 1992, Shahan was elected as Bishop of the Episcopal Diocese of Arizona on the fifth ballot during a special diocesan convention. He was consecrated bishop on October 3, 1992 with by Presiding Bishop Edmond L. Browning as chief consecrator. During his tenure, he was known for his leadership in church administration and pastoral care. He retired in 2004 and returned to Kansas to spend his remaining years with his family.

== Personal life ==
Shahan married Mary Carol in 1963, whom he met at a debate tournament in Lawrence, Kansas, when they were both 14 years old. They were married for 57 years and had two daughters, Sarah Elizabeth Lauck and Susannah Annette Hart.

Shahan died on August 14, 2020, after a long battle with Alzheimer's disease.

Episcopal Church (USA) titles
Preceded by Joseph T. Heistand and Wesley Frensdorff (coadjutor)	Bishop of Arizona; 1992–2004	Succeeded by Kirk S. Smith
