= Kirk Stevan Smith =

Bishop of the Episcopal Diocese of Arizona from 2004 to 2019

The Right Reverend Kirk S. Smith
- Bishop of Arizona
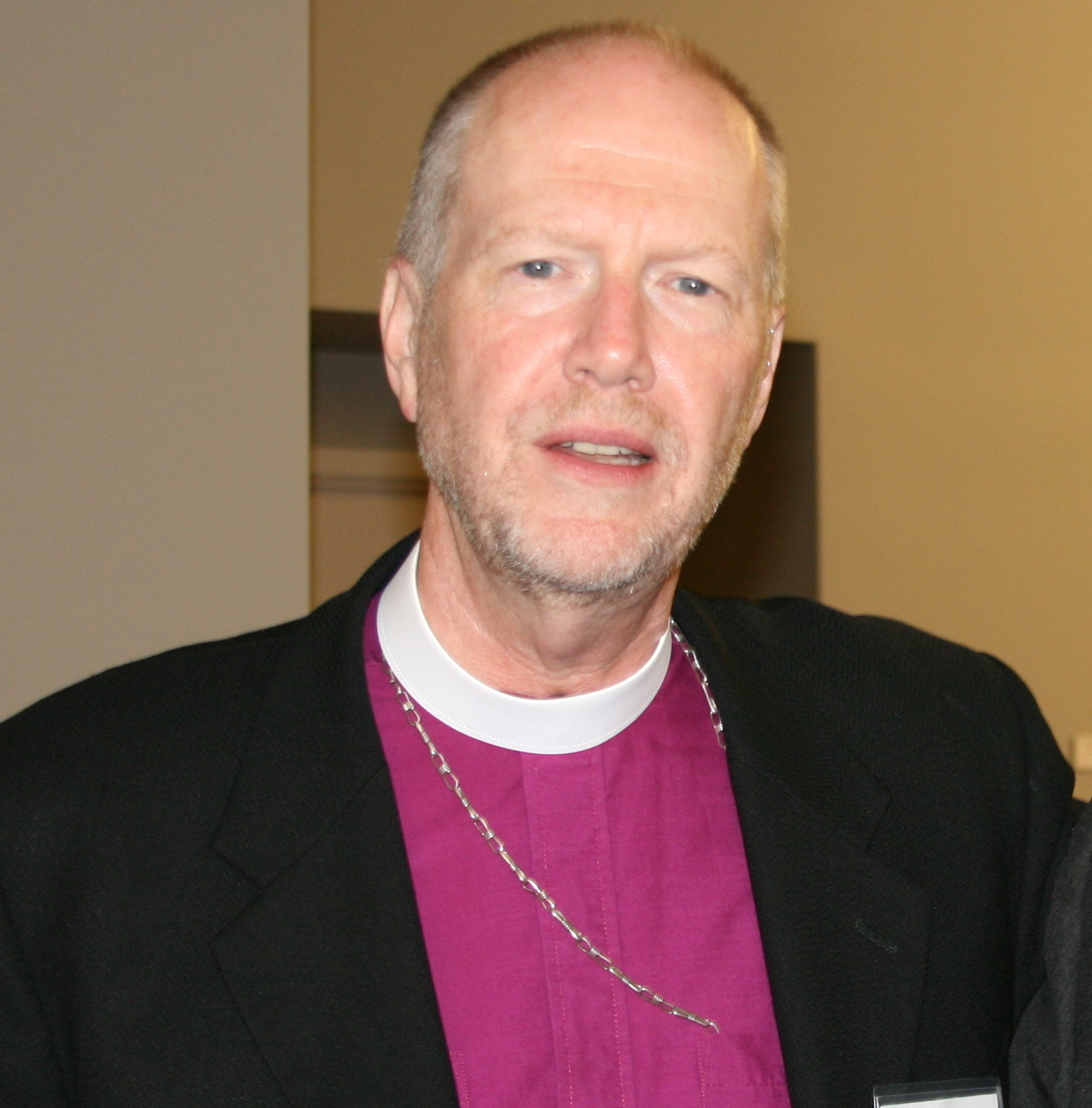
- Bishop Smith in 2013
- Church: Episcopal Church
- Diocese: Arizona
- In office: 2004–2019
- Predecessor: Robert R. Shahan
- Successor: Jennifer A. Reddall

Orders
- Ordination: 3 November 1980
- Consecration: 24 April 2004 by Frank Griswold

Personal details
- Born: June 6, 1951 (age 75) Soap Lake, Washington, United States
- Denomination: Anglican
- Parents: Richard Smith & Harriet Smith
- Spouse: Holly Hamlett (m. 1979); Laura Fisher (m. 1998)
- Children: 2

Kirk Stevan Smith (born 6 June 1951) was the bishop of the Episcopal Diocese of Arizona from 2004 to 2019.

== Early life and education ==
Smith was born on June 6, 1951, in Soap Lake, Washington, the son of Rev. Richard Smith and Harriet Smith. Rev. Richard served the Presbyterian Church National Headquarters in Manhattan, and Smith spent his childhood in New Jersey. In 1973 Smith moved to Phoenix, where he graduated from Arcadia High School in 1969. He was a graduate of Lewis and Clark College in Portland, Oregon with a Bachelor of History, during that time he was received into the Episcopal Church. Smith went on to earn his Ph.D. in medieval church history from Cornell University in 1976, having spent an academic year at Oxford University studying and writing his thesis.

== Ordained ministry ==
Smith studied for holy orders at the Berkeley Divinity School at Yale, was deaconed in 1979, and ordained a priest in 1980, through the auspices of his home diocese of Arizona. Following ordination Smith served as a curate for St. John's West Hartford, Connecticut and as rector of St. Ann's Old Lyme, Connecticut. In 1991 Smith, his wife and two children, moved to Los Angeles to serve as the Rector of St. James. During his tenure at St. James’ Church, Smith taught Anglican history at the Episcopal Seminary at Claremont, and served as Diocesan Ecumenical Officer. By 1998 Smith was remarried to Laura Fisher Smith, a graphic designer. In 2000 he was made a Canon of the Cathedral of the Diocese of Los Angeles.

== Bishop ==
On October 18, 2003, he was elected Bishop of Arizona, the fifth bishop after the establishment of the diocese in 1959. He was consecrated on April 21, 2004, with Presiding Bishop Frank Griswold as chief consecrator. Smith received an honorary Doctor of Divinity degree in October 2005 from Berkeley Divinity School at Yale. In 2013, Smith co-authored, along with three ecumenical bishops (Roman Catholic, Lutheran and United Methodist), Bishops on the Border: Pastoral Responses to Immigration about their common experiences with key immigration issues, especially those being played out in the state of Arizona. In 2018 Smith underwent surgery for a cancer diagnosis. After 15 years as Bishop of Arizona, he retired on March 9, 2019, and now lives in Sedona, Arizona.

== Personal life ==
Smith married Laura Fisher in 1998, he had two children, Jordan and Nathaniel, from a previous marriage. After retiring as Bishop of Arizona he taught church history at General Theological Seminary in New York City.

== See also ==
- List of Episcopal bishops of the United States
- Historical list of the Episcopal bishops of the United States
