= James Henry Darlington =

19th and 20th-century American Episcopal bishop

The Right Reverend James Henry Darlington D.D., LL.D., Ph.D.
- Bishop of Harrisburg
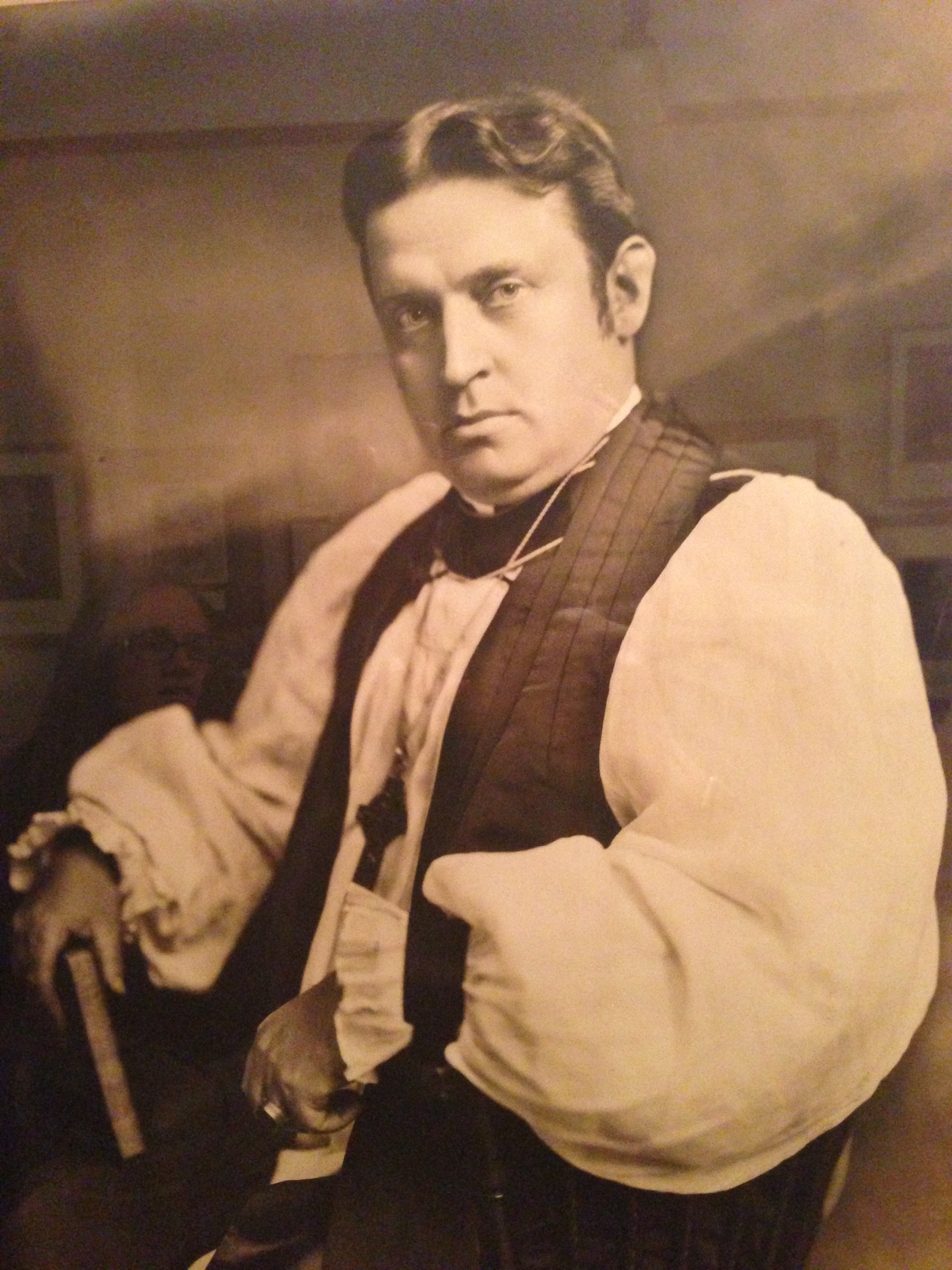
- Church: Episcopal Church
- Diocese: Harrisburg
- Elected: February 1, 1905
- In office: 1905–1930
- Successor: Hunter Wyatt-Brown

Orders
- Ordination: November 26, 1882 by Abram Newkirk Littlejohn
- Consecration: April 26, 1905 by Ozi William Whitaker

Personal details
- Born: June 9, 1856 Brooklyn, New York, United States
- Died: August 14, 1930 (aged 74) Kingston, New York, United States
- Denomination: Anglican
- Parents: Thomas Darlington & Hannah Anne Goodliffe
- Spouse: Ella Louise Beams
- Children: 5
- Education: New York University; Princeton University; St. John's College; Dickinson College

James Henry Darlington (June 9, 1856 – August 14, 1930) was the first Episcopal bishop of Harrisburg, now jurisdictionally the Episcopal Diocese of Central Pennsylvania.

== Biography ==
James Henry Darlington was descended from old New England, New York and Virginia colonial families. The name Darlington is French, being originally De Arlington or D'Arlington. He was born at Brooklyn, New York, June 9, 1856, son of Thomas and Hannah (Goodliffe) Darlington, and a grandson of Peter Darlington. James Henry Darlington entered New York University, graduating from the academic course with the degree of B.A. in 1877; graduated from Princeton Seminary in 1880, receiving in 1884 the degree of Ph.D. from Princeton University and D.D. in 1895 from his alma mater; LL.D from St. John's College, Annapolis, Maryland, in 1905, and from Dickinson College in 1907.

He took deacon's orders in the Episcopal Church on January 25, 1882 and was ordained priest by Bishop Littlejohn on November 26 of the same year. During the year 1882–1883 he was assistant in Christ Church, Bedford Avenue, Brooklyn, New York, becoming rector the following year. He officiated there until 1905, when he became First Bishop of Harrisburg, Pennsylvania (having been chosen on the 15th ballot of a Special Convention convened to elect a bishop for this newly created diocese.) Bishop Darlington was the author of Verses for Children and Verses by the Way, and editor of the Hymnal of the Church. He was chaplain of the Forty-seventh Regiment of the National Guard of the State of New York for eight years. He was a member of the General Society of Colonial Wars, the Sons of the Revolution, Saint Nicholas Society in the City of New York, The Huguenot Society of America, Society of the Cincinnati, National Geographic and other societies, and of the University Club of Brooklyn, New York, and the Westminster Club of England.

Bishop Darlington lectured at New York University and Cuddesdon College, Wheatly, Oxford, and several other American universities. He was a thirty-third degree Scottish Rite Mason, chaplain of the Masonic Grand Lodge of Pennsylvania, chaplain of the Pennsylvania Society and chaplain-general of the Huguenot Society of America, and published numerous addresses and pamphlets which had a large circulation. He was a lieutenant colonel on the staff of the Governor of Pennsylvania, a member of the committee of public safety of Pennsylvania during World War I, president of the Serbian Relief Fund of the United States, honorary vice president of the American Peace Society, and a member of the advisory committee of the National Probation Association. He was a lifelong advocate of Temperance movement and Prohibition, and during the early years of his episcopate in Pennsylvania, he fought the establishment of saloons in Pennsylvania's mining regions by establishing "lighthouses," which were clubs for the miners with gymnasiums, showers and game rooms.

Bishop Darlington married, July 26, 1886, in the Cathedral of the Incarnation, at Garden City, Long Island, New York, Ella Louise Bearns, daughter of James Sterling Bearns, president of the Kings County Bank, Brooklyn. The Bishop and his wife were popular in the social life of the city and diocese, and were noted for their hospitality, their winter home, at Harrisburg, Pennsylvania, being the scene of many functions. Their villa at Newport, "The Corners," entertained a number of bishops and other leading church men.

Among the children of Bishop and Mrs. Darlington were Henry Vanes Bearns and Gilbert Sterling Bancroft, both graduates of Columbia University, and the General Theological Seminary of the Episcopal Church, in New York City; Elliott Christopher Bearns, who studied at Columbia University; Eleanor Townsend, and Kate Brampton. All three of his sons followed in their father's footsteps, becoming Episcopal priests as well. A sixth child, Alfred William Bearns, died in infancy.

Darlington was prominent in the Episcopal Church, and was head of its Episcopal Commission on Closer Union with the Eastern Orthodox Church. He was a correspondent of President Woodrow Wilson and served on several war-related committees during World War I, in the course of which he received many decorations, including the Legion of Honourr from France; Grand Commander of the Order of the Redeemer from Greece; Order of St. Sava from Serbia; Commander of the Order of Isabella the Catholic from Spain; Commander of the Order of the Crown of Italy; and Commander of the Order of Leopold (Belgium).

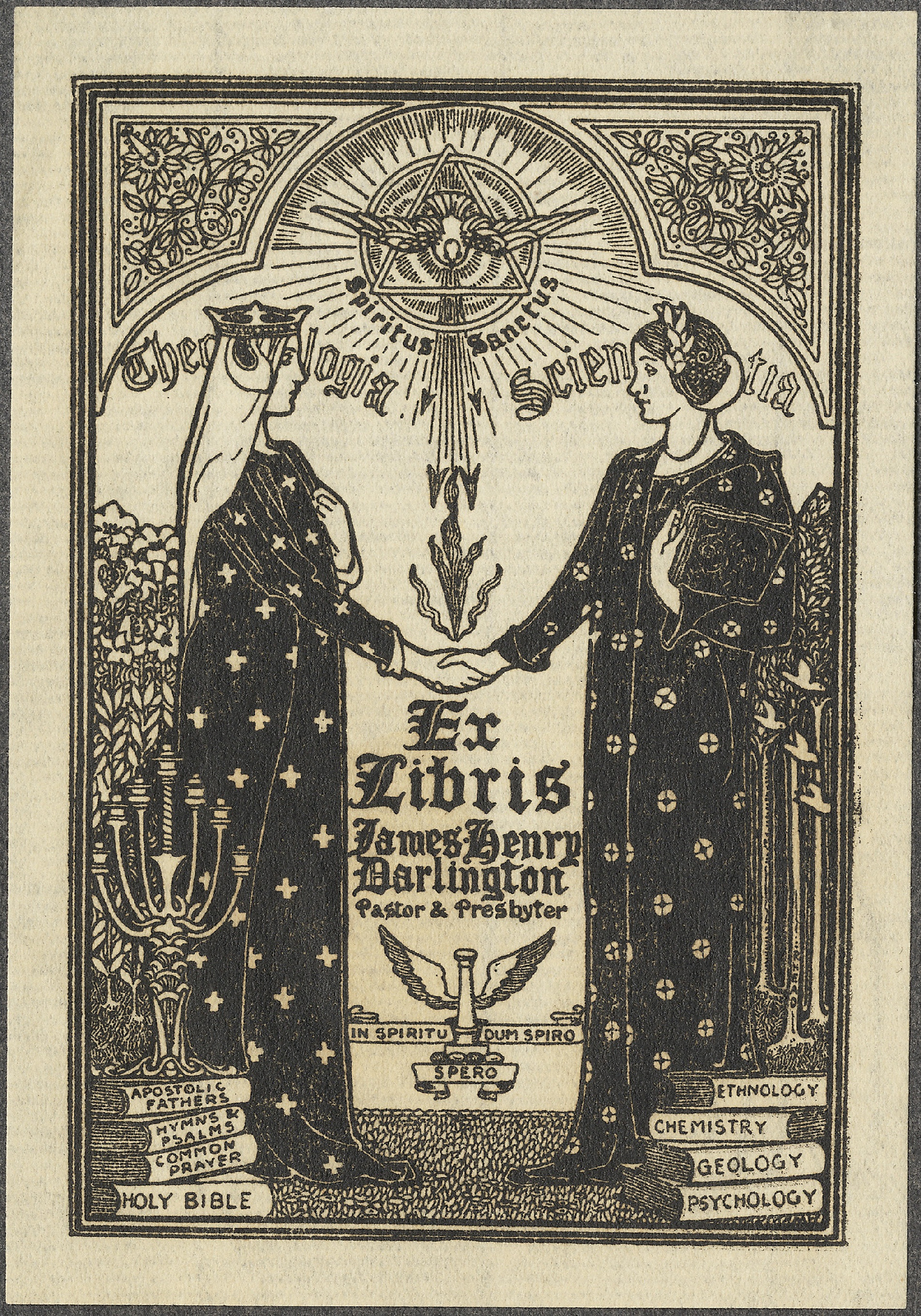
Bishop Darlington's bookplate

Darlington was also a published poet, a book collector and a noted collector of historical musical instruments, and his collection forms the basis of what is today the Historical Musical Instrument Collection of the Vassar College Department of Music. As noted in his obituary, "The varied character of Bishop Darlington's interests was seen on the occasion of his seventy-fourth birthday, June 9, 1930, when he received congratulatory messages from President Hoover; the Rt. Rev. James E. N. Freeman, Bishop of Washington; the Rev. Dr. S. Parkes Cadman, the Archbishop of Canterbury; the Bishop of London; the Metropolitan Platon, Archbishop of the Russian church in the United States; General Smedley Butler of the United States Marine Corps; Charles M. Schwab; and J. P. Morgan."

His wife Ella was an active supporter of women's rights, Founder and President of the Working Women's Vacation Society of Brooklyn, and author of Mission Study Classes of the American Church Mrs. Darlington came from a wealthy Pittsburgh oil family, and her resources allowed the Darlingtons to live and entertain lavishly both in Harrisburg, Pennsylvania and Newport, Rhode Island. Upon moving to Harrisburg, the Darlingtons acquired a large mansion which they named "Bishopscourt," and which Darlington used as both his residence and office. At his death in 1930, he willed Bishopscourt "to the Diocese of Harrisburg for the comfort and grandeur of his apostolic successors." The young son of Bishop Darlington's immediate successor recalled living in the "diocesan palace:"

At Bishopscourt, I remember measuring the distance from the front door to the end of the laundry room—one hundred and twenty feet. Though narrow in width, the house ran the length of a city block. The front parlor was furnished with Persians, uncomfortable cherry wood Victorian furniture, pictures of sailing ships mounted in gilt frames, and an ebony Steinway. On the second floor was "the baronial hall," as it was called. It seated at least a hundred people, with a low platform at one end and a balcony at the other...The hall was perfect for roller skating—that is, until I was caught ruining the wooden floor. On the first floor, Father held early Sunday morning family services in a small chapel with tile floor, marble altar, and a stained glass window with a dove of peace descending.
