= Lucien Lee Kinsolving =

American Episcopal bishop

Lucien Lee Kinsolving (May 14, 1862 – December 18, 1929) was first bishop of the missionary diocese that eventually became the Anglican Episcopal Church of Brazil. He was a graduate of the Virginia Theological Seminary.

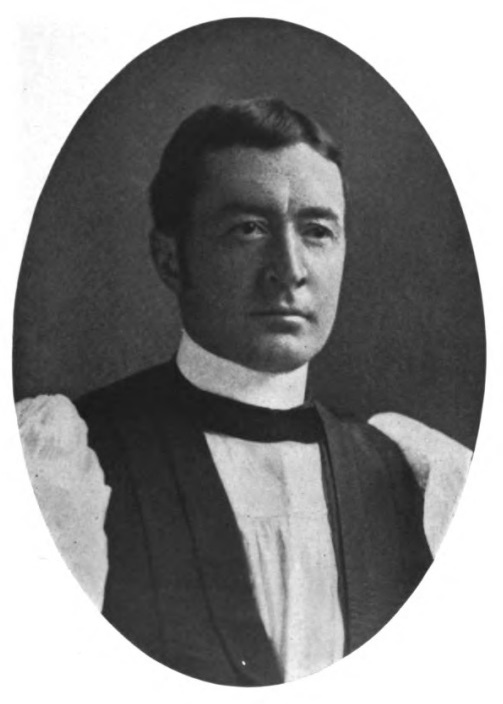
The Rt. Rev. Lucien Lee Kinsolving

== Early and family life ==
Lucien Lee Kinsolving was born to the second wife of the Rev. Otis Americus Kinsolving (1822–1894), minister at St. John's Episcopal Church in Halifax, Virginia. His mother died of complications two weeks later. Like his maternal grandfather Asa Rogers (who served as a Confederate militia general), the Rev. Otis Kinsolving supported the Confederate side, and particularly Mosby's Rangers, although his eldest son Charles James Kinsolving (1846–1920) joined the Richmond Howitzers light artillery company. While Lucien was still an infant, Otis Kinsolving was imprisoned for treason by occupying Union forces, so relatives helped with the children until the widower moved with his family to Halifax County, Virginia at war's end and remarried.

Another elder half-brother by his father's first wife, George Herbert Kinsolving, became the second bishop of the Episcopal Diocese of Texas and later delivered the sermon at the consecration of this bishop. His slightly older brother, the Rev. Arthur Barksdale Kinsolving (1861–1961), became known as an author and historian in Maryland and published a biography of this Bishop Kinsolving in 1940. His half-brother by his father's third wife, the Rev. Wythe Leigh Kinsolving, served Episcopal churches in the South and in New York City.

After education in Halifax and then Episcopal High School in Alexandria, Virginia, Kinsolving spent three years as a lay missionary among the small parishes in West Virginia. He then decided upon a theological career common to many in his family and enrolled at the University of Virginia. After two years, he moved back to Alexandria to attend Virginia Theological Seminary (1886–1889) with a special interest in Brazil, although at the time seminary policy discouraged mission work in Catholic countries.

In 1891, Lucien Kinsolving returned to the United States to marry Alice Brown (1865–1944) of New Jersey, a kinswoman of Bishop McIlvaine of Ohio as well as descendant of founding father Richard Stockton. The University of Pennsylvania awarded him an honorary Doctor of Divinity degree in 1899.

== Ministry ==
Virginia's bishop, Francis McNeece Whittle, ordained Kinsolving and fellow Virginia Seminary graduate James Watson Morris deacons in June and priests in August, 1889, whereupon they set out on a stormy sea voyage to Brazil, sponsored by the American Church Missionary Society. To a limited extent they followed in the footsteps of Anglican missionaries there before their birth, when any evangelism among the native population by non-Catholics was illegal, except for services in English held pursuant to a limited concession in an 1810 treaty between England and Portugal. Although Portugal recognized Brazil's independence in 1825, under a constitutional monarchy headed by former Portuguese royalty, Anglican missionaries continued to serve primarily foreign sailors and traders in the cities. However, one Scot-born missionary educated in Ohio and funded by the Episcopal Church and American Bible Society, Richard Holden, had tried to evangelize in northern Brazil (including Belem, Para and Bahia in the Amazon basin), but ultimately disaffiliated from the Anglican church in 1864 without establishing any permanent mission.

On November 15, 1889, shortly after these missionaries arrived in Brazil (and as they learned Portuguese under the auspices of a Presbyterian pastor near São Paulo), a coup d'état deposed the king, Dom Pedro II, disestablished the Catholic Church, established a federal republic and guaranteed freedom of religion.Kinsolving and Morris soon moved to Brazil's southernmost state, Rio Grande do Sul, and its capitol, Porto Alegre. That state had received many European immigrants during the previous decades, especially Protestant Germans.

The young Americans arrived at Porto Alegre on April 21, 1890, accompanied by four Brazilians, of whom Vicente Brande, Antonio M. de Fraga and Americo V. Cabral would all serve the church for many years. They held their first public service on Trinity Sunday, June 1, 1890, and in August 1891 opened a second mission in Rio Grande, the port city where Presbyterians entrusted a small congregation to these Episcopalians. A third mission was established in Pelotas after the arrival of recent VTS graduates the Rev. William Cabell Brown and John Gaw Meem, together with lay missionary Mary Packard (daughter of the VTS dean and who would serve 27 years in Brazil before her retirement).

Unlike prior missionaries, these Americans established both English- and Portuguese-speaking congregations. Kinsolving also founded a small theological school before briefly returning in 1891–1892 to the United States to marry his fiancé (who returned with him to the Rio Grande city mission), as well as to secure additional funding and missionaries. West Virginia's bishop George Peterkin made an episcopal visit in 1893, during which he ordained four Brazilians as deacons and confirmed 142 candidates at four missions (the 3 city missions and one in the town of Santa Rita do Rio dos Sinos). Also in that year, the Episcopalians began publishing O Estandarte Cristao (the Christian Standard) in Porto Alegre. Bishop Peterkin also arranged for new Portuguese translations of the Bible and Book of Common Prayer, which Brown completed in 1897 and which were published in Philadelphia for shipment southward.

The new missionaries first concentrated their evangelism in the eastern region of the Rio Grande do Sul, which like the Confederacy, attempted to withdraw from Brazil in 1892 and received concessions in 1895. In 1895, they laid the cornerstone for their first church building, Calvary Church at Santa Rita (completed and consecrated in 1900, now the oldest Anglican church in the country). By 1897, when Bishop Peterkin arranged for a visitation by the Right Rev. Waite Stirling, bishop for the Falkland Islands, the eight missionaries had established two additional missions, at Viamao near Porto Alegre and at Boa Vista near Pelotas. Bishop Stirling ordained three of the Brazilian deacons to the priesthood (Peterkin having deposed the fourth). Mrs. Kinsolving and Mary Packard by then had also helped found a women's auxiliary.

On May 30, 1898, pursuant to Bishop Peterkin's advice, clergy and laity gathered in Porto Alegre and elected Kinsolving to become their bishop, with Meem designated as their representatives to carry the news to the General Convention, which approved it in principle. Twelve bishops participated in Kinsolving's consecration as bishop for a foreign country at St. Bartholomew's Church in New York City on January 6, 1899, led by the Presiding Bishop, with Bishop Peterkin and the bishop of Albany presenting the new bishop, and his half-brother delivering the sermon.

This missionary diocese later became the Brazilian Episcopal Church, Igreja Episcopal Anglicana do Brasil. Meanwhile, in 1900 Morris opened a mission at Santa Maria da Bocca do Monte, a day's railroad journey from Porto Alegre, followed by other towns along the railroad lines: Bage (1902), Sao Gabriel (1906), Montenegro (1909) and Livramento (1910). On January 1, 1905, the American Church Missionary Society turned over its Brazilian work to the Episcopal Church's Domestic and Foreign Missionary Society, and in 1907, the General Convention formally recognized the Brazilian Convocation as a Missionary District, which required Kinsolving's resignation and re-election as Missionary Bishop of Southern Brazil. By 1907 the new district had 29 missions and stations and 974 communicants, who were served by Bishop Kinsolving, four American and eight Brazilian priests as well as one Brazilian perpetual deacon.

As 1907 ended, Brown moved to Rio de Janeiro, where he had previously occasionally ministered to the congregations of Anglican chaplaincies (then under the jurisdiction of the Bishop of the Falkland Islands). Bishop Kinsolving envisioned moving the diocesan headquarters to the national capital, or at least expanding the Protestant presence. Thus was founded the Church of the Redeemer, the state's first Brazilian congregation in 1908, and Brown also organized Trinity Chapel in Méier (a suburb, now a neighborhood), before he was called back to Virginia to become its coadjutor bishop and Meem assumed primary responsibility for that geographic area until his death in 1924. Meanwhile, VTS graduate the Rev. William W.M. Thomas helped establish the Southern Cross School for Boys (a boarding school) in Porto Alegre 1912, and Morris upon his return to Brazil in 1920 (after 18 years in the United States for family heath reasons) reopened the theological seminary in Porto Alegre and by 1923 built the gothic Church of the Ascension on school grounds. Also by that year, the Church of the Mediator in Santa Maria, Trinity Church in Porto Alegre and Church of the Redeemer in Pelotas were all self-supporting, no longer dependent on mission aid.

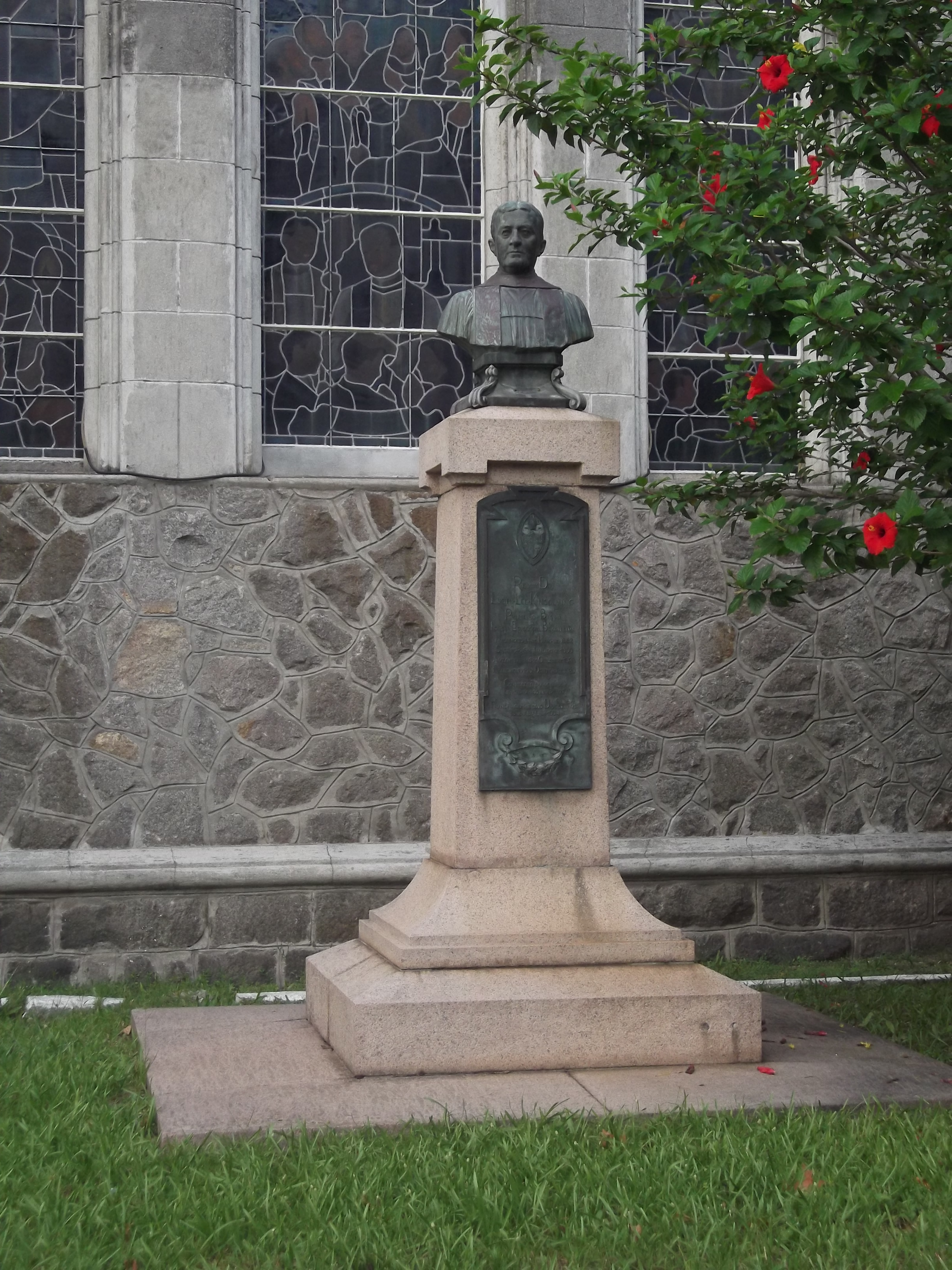
Lucien Lee Kinsolving

Kinsolving attended the Lambeth Conference in 1910, and by 1923 he had secured the services of a Japanese layman, J. Yasoji Ito, to work among the many Japanese immigrants in São Paulo state. Bishop Kinsolving ordained him to the diaconate in 1926, before his own retirement on health grounds. In 1925, the diocesan convention elected the Rev. William Matthew Merrick Thomas as his suffragan bishop, and after the General Convention of 1925 approved, Thomas was consecrated shortly after Christmas at St. Paul's Church in Baltimore, Maryland, where Bishop Kinsolving's brother Arthur was rector, and succeeded Kinsolving after his resignation in 1928.

By the time Bishop Kinsolving returned to the United States for health reasons in October 1826, the diocese had five churches in Rio Grande do Sul which were by then able to support themselves, as well as missions throughout that state, plus seven missions or stations in the national capital (Rio de Janeiro) and 22 missions and stations in São Paulo state (half of which were Japanese), and nine small parochial schools. In his 27-year ministry in Brazil, Kinsolving had baptised 13,535 people and confirmed 4,997, as well as ordained 23 Brazilian clergy (two by then retired, and one of whom, Theodoro Pithan, would become the diocese's first native-born bishop in 1939). Membership stood at 6,261 baptized persons (of whom 3,129 were communicants), and the bishop had overseen construction of 25 churches as well as assisted many other foreign missionaries and their mission churches.

== Death and legacy ==
Kinsolving died on December 18, 1929, and he is buried at the Virginia Theological Seminary; his wife Alice survived him by nearly 15 years and is buried at St. Andrew's Churchyard in Burlington, New Jersey. A bust of the founding bishop stands outside Anglican Church of the Savior, Rio Grande, Brazil.

The Brazilian Episcopal Church became an autonomous province of the international Anglican Communion in 1965. The Episcopal Church recognizes Kinsolving and four of his fellow American missionaries and six Brazilians liturgically on June 7 as the Pioneers of the Episcopal Anglican Church of Brazil.
