= Church of the Epiphany (Philadelphia) =

Coordinates: 39.9511°N 75.1661°W

Church of The Epiphany (demolished)
- Church of The Epiphany
- Location: Philadelphia, Pennsylvania
- Country: United States
- Denomination: Episcopal (former)
- Churchmanship: Evangelical church

History
- Status: Demolished
- Founded: March 24, 1834
- Consecrated: October 12, 1834

Architecture
- Architect: Thomas Ustick Walter
- Style: Greek Revival
- Demolished: 1902

Specifications
- Capacity: c. 1,000 worshippers

Administration
- Diocese: Pennsylvania

The Church of The Epiphany was an Episcopal congregation in Philadelphia, Pennsylvania, in the United States. Founded in 1834, it merged with St. Luke's Church in 1898 to form The Church of St. Luke and the Epiphany. Its 1834 Greek Revival building, designed by architect Thomas Ustick Walter and located at 1501-15 Chestnut Street, was demolished in 1902.

== History ==
In 1833, Dr. Caspar Morris, Alexander W. Johnston, Robert Coldcleugh, and Lewis R. Ashhurst proposed a new congregation for the growing neighborhood around Broad and Chestnut Streets. The cornerstone was laid on March 24, 1834, by Bishop William White with the first service held in the basement of the Church the following August. The Church of the Epiphany was consecrated on Oct 12, 1834, by Bishop White; The Rev. Stephen H. Tyng, rector of St. Paul's Church, Philadelphia, was called as the first Rector. Dr. Tyng was a leader of the evangelical movement and the church became a meeting place for evangelicals from all denominations. He was an outspoken critic of the Roman Catholic Church, yet he was a fierce opponent of the Philadelphia Nativist Riots (1844). His autocratic style and strident views, however, had limited appeal beyond those in the small evangelical community.

The Rev. James H. Fowles, rector of St. Batholomew's Church, Colleton County, SC, was called to be rector in 1845. Under his leadership the debt of the church was liquidated, the building was enlarged and the interior renovated to be more in keeping with contemporary Episcopal practice. His health began to deteriorate during the fourth year of his rectorate. He died on March 5, 1854, near Wateree, SC.

The rectorship of The Rev. Dudley A. Tyng, son of the first rector, was filled with controversy. In 1856, one of the wardens challenged him during a sermon where he denounced the institution of slavery and used the 1854 fight over slavery in Kansas. In response, the Vestry approved a resolution stating it was inappropriate to "select the Lord's day and the pulpit of this Church as the time and place for the discussion of any question of sectional politics." Tyng would not agree to refrain from such discussions and the Vestry asked for his resignation, which he refused to tender. The controversy went on for months. An election was held among the congregation the results of which supported the vestry's position. Tyng still would not resign. Finally the Bishop agreed to allow a new church, Church of the Covenant, to be built for him in order to secure his resignation. Unfortunately, Tyng died as a result of a farm accident that nearly severed one of his arms. It is ironic that in his last sermon, he declared that he would rather lose his right arm than fall short of declaring God's word. Among his last words to his friends surrounding his deathbed were "Tell them 'Let us all stand up for Jesus -- let us all stand in Christ Jesus in prayer, -- accepted in Christ, having no other claims than His righteousness, that Christ may be glorified in us forever." Moved by these words, his friend the Rev. George Duffield Jr. penned the words that would become the popular hymn "Stand Up, Stand Up for Jesus" which is #561 in The [Episcopal] Hymnal 1982.

Determined to avoid a repeat of the unpleasant experience of Tyng's rectorship, a southerner and friend of the late Rev. Fowles was elected rector. The Rev. William Otis Prentiss was elected rector in 1857. He remained at Epiphany for only one year and then returned to his native South Carolina.

The Rev. John Cracraft was called to be rector in December 1858 and assumed leadership of the parish in January 1859. Francis Wells, Church of the Epiphany's historian, noted "[Cracraft] occupied the Rectorship for a little more than 3 years ... it was the period of the Parish's greatest depression both spiritually and materially, and was terminated by [his resignation on] March 2, 1862." The size of the congregation dwindled and the resources of the Church were depleted by 1862.

Under these dire conditions, The Rev. Dr. Richard Newton, rector of St. Paul's Church, Philadelphia, was called to be rector in 1862. During the nine years, he served at Epiphany the congregation grew substantially and was put on a better financial footing. His greatest interest lay in the Sunday schools where he preached a series of sermons that were published in several languages and distributed worldwide. The Rev. Dr. Newton was also active in various institutions in Philadelphia, including the University of Pennsylvania's board of trustees. In 1862, Episcopal leaders held a secret meeting at Epiphany where they decided not to recognize the split in the Episcopal Church caused by the Civil War and would only mark southern representatives absent at the upcoming general convention. This action helped ease the reunification of the church after the Civil War (which occurred at St. Luke's Church, Philadelphia). In 1881, The Rev. Dr. Newton retired due to illness and was given the title of Rector Emeritus and a small pension. By the fall of 1881, however, he had recovered and assumed the rectorship of Church of the Covenant, Philadelphia, where he served until his death.

The Rev. George Herbert Kinsolving, rector of St. John's Church, Cincinnati, OH, was called to be rector in 1881. He was active in the work of the Diocese and was a trustee of the Philadelphia Divinity School. His rectorship was cut short when he was elected Episcopal Bishop of Texas in 1883. At this time, the Church claimed 613 members and a value of $300,000.00.

The Rev. Thomas A. Tidball was the last rector at Epiphany and also the first of the consolidated church. A scholar and author of a theological study, he was installed in 1884 and it was through his persistence that the merger was accomplished.

In 1895, prominent Philadelphia merchant, John Wanamaker approached The Church of The Epiphany to purchase its property. The Vestry approved the sale for $600,000 with the intention of relocating the church farther west. They could not, however, get the required consent of the three closest parishes for the move. Bishop Ozi W. Whitaker suggested the merger with St. Luke's Church, Philadelphia, which occurred on April 6, 1898. The building was demolished in 1902. Upon the sale of the grounds, remains from 33 vaults in the church burial ground were exhumed and re-interred at West Laurel Hill Cemetery, South Laurel Hill Cemetery, Machpelah Cemetery, and Woodland Cemetery among several others. A large monument that stood at the corner dedicated to Rev. Fowles was relocated to West Laurel Hill.

== Architecture ==
The Church of The Epiphany was designed by noted Philadelphia architect Thomas Ustick Walter in the Greek Revival style. While the envelope of the building was rather plain and lacking detail, the portico, elevated above street level, featured a Doric colonnade with associated triglyph/metope details and flat pediment. Perhaps the explanation for this curious entrance was that the original plans called for a tall wooden steeple. The interior, similar to many Protestant churches at the time, was plainly decorated, with white painted walls and clear glass. A deep gallery ran across the south end, with two small recessed galleries on the east and west sides. The chancel was square, with four Corinthian columns separating it from the nave. Half of it was occupied by the organ gallery, which was supported on pillars, the chancel running in under it and entered by a door at the rear, which communicated by a flight of stairs with the vestry room in the basement. The chancel rail was continued around four sides of the chancel. The pulpit occupied the center, with reading desks on both sides, forming one continuous structure. A small oaken communion table, covered with crimson velvet, was placed in front of the pulpit. This table remained in use until the enlargement of the church in 1853. The ceiling was also minimally decorated and featured a large ventilator at its center. A large central oil chandelier lighted the church and smaller ones also hanging from the ceiling until 1841, when gas was introduced.

In 1842, the existing galleries were taken down, and new galleries erected on the three sides of the church. No further important change was made until 1853, when the building was enlarged by an extension to the north line of the lot. This was done under the direction of John Mcarthur, architect, at a cost of $19,400. The square chancel was retained but the old organ gallery was removed and the organ placed upon a platform at the rear of the chancel and raised about three feet above its floor. The rail was returned against this platform, giving a three-sided kneeling space. The original communion table was replaced by a slightly larger one; painted carved and covered with a marble slab. It was placed at the center and rear of the chancel, which was very shallow on account of the organ platform. The pulpit was removed to the east side and the reading desk to the west side.

The next change to the interior was brought about suddenly by a fire on July 18, 1865, which destroyed a building at the rear of the church, the heat affecting the north wall of the church so seriously as to require its reconstruction. As a result, the organ was moved to the south gallery of the church, and in 1866 the chancel was remodeled again. This was done upon designs and under supervision of John Crump, builder.

The next important change of the interior was made in 1880 under the direction of George W. Hewitt, architect. The upper galleries were removed; the windows, which were formerly of plain glass, covered with venetian blinds, were replaced with stained glass; the whole interior which had up to then been painted in white or pale neutral tints, was repainted in a polychromic scheme typical of the period. A brass altar rail replaced the existing on in the chancel. The church was at the same time recarpeted and reupholstered throughout. This cost of this improvement was $5,693,97.

In 1881, an organ chamber was constructed by utilizing the rooms on the northeast corner of the building, formerly used by the Rector, Sexton, and Sunday school library. The organ installed was built by George Jardine & Sons of New York City and was well regarded as one of the finest in the city. One-half of the east gallery was removed due to its interference with the organ and choir in their new location. The organ was blown by a water engine in the cellar.

== Music ==
=== Organs ===
The first organ at Epiphany Church was built by Henry Corrie in 1835. The In 1882, the church purchased an organ built by George Jardine of New York City. It was well noted for its sound and size.

=== Organists/choirmasters ===
- Charles Jarvis (1835–1846)
- Edwin Eisenberg (1846–1851)
- William H. Fenney (1851–1854)
- Charles Jarvis Jr. (1854–1856)
- Thomas Lord (1856–1857)
- Louis Borewitz (1857–1858)
- George F. Jones (1859–1863)
- J. S. Byrd (1863)
- Aaron Taylor (1863–1864)
- John Welch (1864–1865)
- William H. Fenney (1865–1871)
- M. M. Walker (1871–1881)
- James E. Ackroyd (1881-1897)
- Samuel Tudor Strang (1897-1898)

== Leadership ==
=== Rectors ===
In the Episcopal Church in the United States of America, the rector is the priest elected to head a self-supporting parish.

- The Rev. Dr. Stephen Higginson Tyng (1834–1845)
- The Rev. James H. Fowles (1845–1854)
- The Rev. Dudley Atkins Tyng (1854–1856)
- The Rev. William Otis Prentiss (1857–1858)
- The Rev. John Wesley Cracraft (1858–1861)
- The Rev. Dr. Richard Herber Newton (1862–1881)
- The Rev. George Herbert Kinsolving (1881–1892)
- The Rev. Dr. Thomas A. Tidball (1892–1898)

=== Assistants ===
- The Rev. Amos D. McCoy (1839–1840)
- The Rev. William Bryant (1840–1841)
- The Rev. Peter Van Pelt (1842–1849)
- The Rev. Daniel Washburn (1851–1852)
- The Rev. Richard Temple (1852–1853)
- The Rev. George H. Walsh (1853–1854)
- The Rev. George E. Thrall (1854–1856)
- The Rev. Rees C. Evans (1856–1859)
- The Rev. Dr. R. Heber Newton (1860-1862) Assistant Rector
- The Rev. Gustave Murray (1862–1864)
- The Rev. Charles E. Murray (1864) Curate
- The Rev. Joshua Cowpland Jr. (1864–1865)
- The Rev. Snyder B. Simes (1865–1868) Assistant Rector
- The Rev. William Wilberforce Newton (1866–1870)
- The Rev. Jonathan Everist Cathell (1870–1871)
- The Rev. Dr. Alex Shiras (1872–1873)
- The Rev. Charles Betticher (1874–1876)
- The Rev. W.F.B. Jackson (1876–1879)
- The Rev. E. Warren Clark (1880–1881)
- The Rev. A. G. Baker (1882-1884)
- The Rev. Richard L. Howell (1884–1886)
- The Rev. John R. Moses (1887–1888) Assistant Rector
- The Rev. Lucien Moore Robinson (1888–1892) Assistant Rector
- The Rev. Henri M. G. Huff (1893–1895) Assistant Rector
- The Rev. Oscar Stewart Michael (1895–1898)

== Relationship With The Diocese ==
The Church of The Epiphany was home to the diocesan convention in 1874, and 1879 through 1886.

== Epiphany Chapel (1862-1898) ==
Epiphany Chapel at 17th and Winter Streets, from Philadelphia Inquirer article 13 Nov 1899.

The Epiphany Chapel began in 1859 as the Mission Sunday School of the Seventh Presbyterian Church of Philadelphia, and was located at 23rd and Race Streets. In November 1862 the school and its facilities became connected with Church of the Epiphany. Soon after the acquisition, discussions began about constructing a new facility on the site capable of housing both a school and chapel.

Instead, a site was selected at northwest corner of 23rd and Cherry Streets and construction started in 1865 on a two-story brick building. The building cost $7,000 to construct and was able to fit 250 students on the main floor and 400 students in the basement. The success of the Mission Sunday School was expanded first with evening chapel services, by 1871 the Mission Sunday School had become Epiphany Chapel. Epiphany Chapel was admitted to the Diocese of Pennsylvania convention in 1878 as a mission of Church of the Epiphany. The chapel remained located at 23 and Cherry Streets until the merger with St. Luke's Church, at which time the parish purchased a lot on 17th Street, spanning between Summer and Winter Streets.

=== Vicars of Epiphany Chapel ===
A vicar in the Episcopal Church is usually the priest-in-charge of a mission of the Parish.

- The Rev. Mason
- The Rev. Charles H. Tucker
- The Rev. Dr. Suddards (1871–1872)
- The Rev. W. F. Garrett (1872–1873)
- The Rev. Charles E. Betticher (1873–1876)
- The Rev. James S. Wallace (1878–1879)
- The Rev. John W. Windsor (1880-1880)
- The Rev. Henry Scott Jeffreys (1880–1881)
- The Rev. Jacob Miller (1881)
- The Rev. H. Greenfield Schorr (1882–1884)
- The Rev. A. George Baker (1885-1886)
- The Rev. Joshua Cowpland Jr (1886–1887)
- The Rev. S. H. Boyer (1889–1890)
- The Rev. Dr. Robert C. Matlack (1890–1891)
- The Rev. Henry McCrea (1891–1893)
- The Rev. John G. Brawn (1893-)
- The Rev. Oscar Stewart Michael (1895–1898)

== Publications ==
- Fowles, James Henry. Protestant Episcopal Views on Baptism, Explained and Defended. Philadelphia: Hooker, 1846.
- Fowles, James Henry. Sermons Preached in the Church of the Epiphany. Philadelphia, 1855.
- Newton, Richard. The Heath in the Wilderness, or, Sermons to the people. New York: Carter, 1888.
- Tyng, Dudley A. Vital Truth and Deadly Error. Cincinnati: H. W. Derby & Co., 1853.
- Tyng, Stephen H. Memoir of the Rev. Gregory T. Bedell, D.D. Rector of St. Andrew's Church, Philadelphia. Philadelphia: Perkins, 1834.
- Tyng, Stephen H. Sermons Preached in the Church of the Epiphany, Philadelphia. Philadelphia: Stavely, 1839.

== Photographs ==
The Church of The Epiphany, c.1900

Print, view of The Church of The Epiphany. Undated.

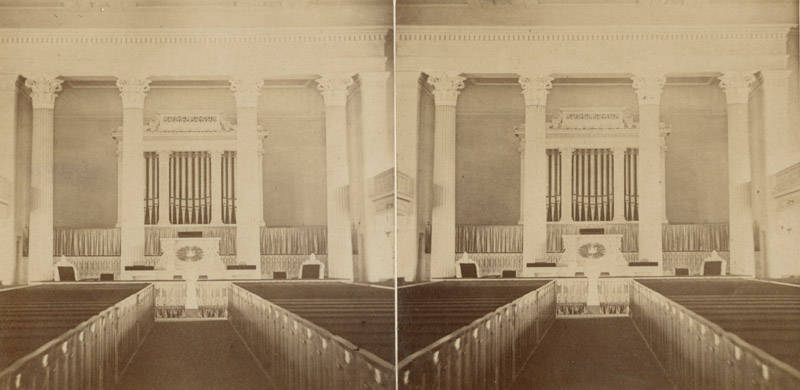
Church of The Epiphany interior, view towards chancel. Undated.

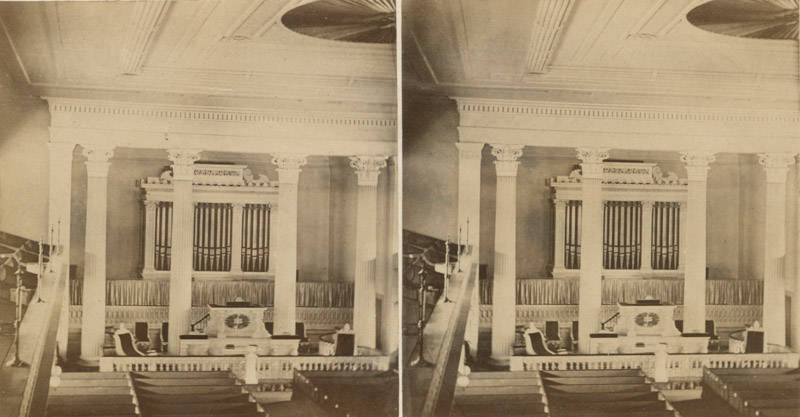
Church of The Epiphany interior, view towards chancel from gallery. Undated.

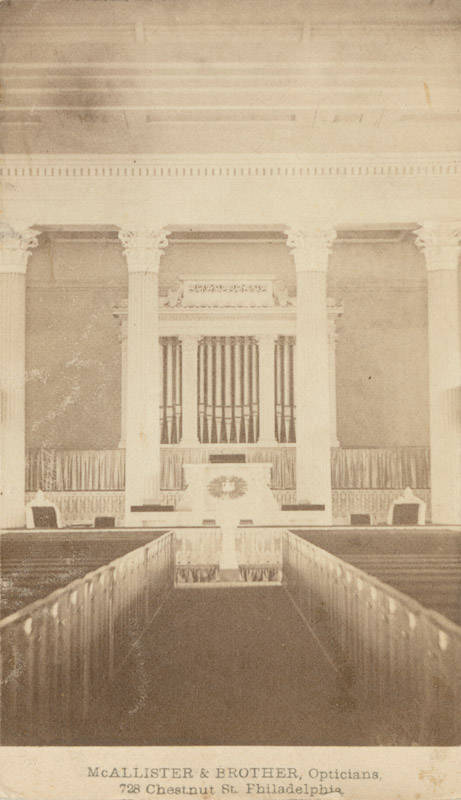
Church of The Epiphany interior, view towards chancel. Undated.

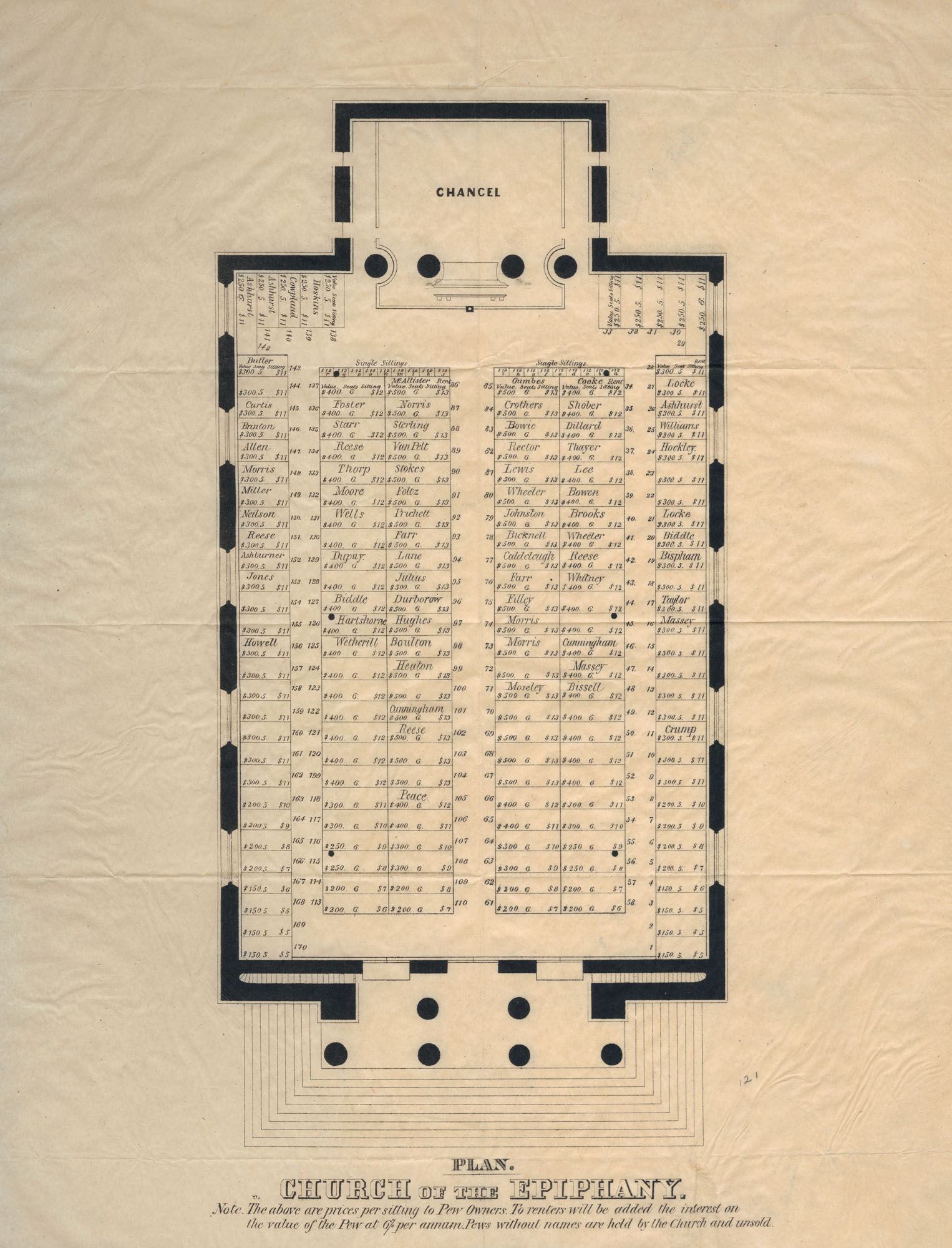
Church of The Epiphany floor plan showing pew rents and family names. Undated.
