= Dedications in the Church of England =

Church Dedication

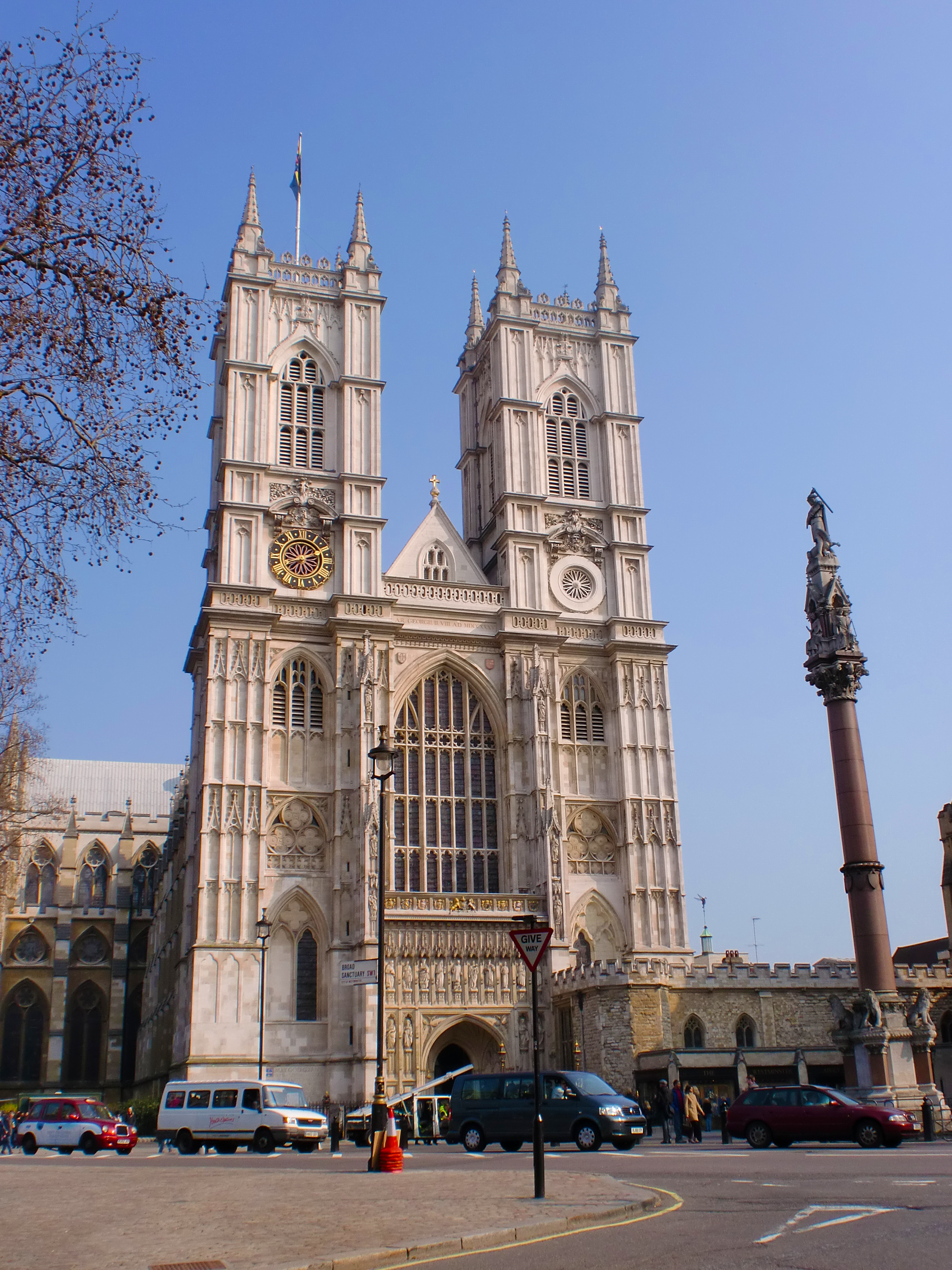
Westminster Abbey is dedicated to Saint Peter

The vast majority of the 16,500 churches in the Church of England are dedicated to one or more people. Most are dedicated to a single 'patron saint', such as Saint Peter or The Virgin Mary, or one of the persons of God, such as Holy Trinity, Christ Church, or The Good Shepherd. Others commemorate Christian events such as the Assumption of Mary or Ascension of Jesus.

== History ==
All churches are dedicated to God, but certainly by the fourth century it was common practice to dedicate a Christian place of worship to one or more patron saints. An early example of this was in 386 when Saint Ambrose dedicated Milan Cathedral to Gervasius and Protasius whose graves he found nearby. Once the Church was established in England it became practice to dedicate a new church's patron saint during the act of consecration by the diocesan bishop, and in fact mass could not be held in a building until the consecration act had taken place. There is much evidence of the dedication of churches prior to 800, with most being dedicated to Saint Peter or to Saint Mary.

During consecration the building would usually be named in honour of a "holy martyr", but sometimes instead a "confessor", "matron", or "virgin", but nonetheless many churches remained undedicated up until the thirteenth century. In 1229 the Bishop of Worcester William of Blois mandated that all churches in his diocese display the date of dedication and name of patron saint alongside the altar, and many medieval churches would also have a painted image of their patron nearby. Churches would also celebrate the feast day of their patron or patrons in what is now known as the 'patronal festival', with local parishioners taking a holiday or naming children after their patron.

The Protestant Reformation of the 16th century swept away centuries of church tradition; the whitewashing of sacred images led to a backlash against saints associated with the church. Whilst not prohibiting them, the Book of Common Prayer contained no text for a dedication service, and with newly constructed churches becoming rarer the practice became less well known. By the 18th century many churches had even forgotten their dedication entirely, so that when the first books were published listing church dedications in the early 18th century (e.g. Browne Willis) many of the dedications had been lost; in a modern analysis of his results on the churches of Devon, around a third of the churches were listed as having unknown dedication, and a further 30% listed dedications that were incorrect, or at the very least differed from their medieval dedication. Worse still, having appeared in print, many dedications were taken to be authoritative and some were thus subsequently adopted by the parish as the authentic dedication.

It was the Victorian era, the first great English church-building era for centuries, that finally revived the interest in patron saints. By this stage many cases the original dedication of churches had rediscovered, whereas others changed the dedication to a new patron saint for any number of reasons. Others gave their dedication a more prosaic twist, giving rise to the many churches now known as "St Michael and All Angels", "All Hallows", or "The Blessed Virgin Mary". By the 20th century, the dedication's continued usage was once again assured, with common usage referring to "St Peter's" as opposed to "Newton Parish Church". In many cases these are names that have been used at that site for well over a thousand years, and in others they are simply 18th century mistakes or creations of the Victorian age.

== Selection of patron saint ==
There was no single set of rules that governed the choice of patron saint for a church, chapel or religious foundation, but analysis of existing and historical dedications shows a number of patterns that demonstrate how patrons were often chosen. The most popular saints in terms of numbers of dedications demonstrate the influence of Rome on the history of English Christianity, as well as being major characters in Biblical studies, with the most popular being St Mary, St Peter, St Michael, St Andrew, and St Paul.

One of the clearest reasons for the choice of many dedications was that the church was founded on or near the site of a saint's activity. A large number of these give rise to the dedications of the churches of Cornwall, but others where a settlement built up around a saint's oratory or residence include Saint Culbone at Culbone in Devon, Saint Beza at St Bees in Cumberland, and Saint Everildis at Everingham in Yorkshire. To these we can add churches founded in existing towns where a saint worked, such as Saint Cuthman at Steyning, Sussex, or Saint Congar at Badgeworth, Somerset, or those where the saint's remains were buried, such as Saint Urith at Chittlehampton, Devon, or Saint Ethelbert at Marden, Herefordshire. Other dedications commemorate a site's founder, for example Saint Etheldreda at Ely Cathedral or Saint Cuthberga at Wimborne Minster, and the collection of relics of foreign saints seems to have inspired the dedications to Saint Firmin at North Crawley, Buckinghamshire, and Saint Sebastian at Great Gonerby, Lincolnshire. One particularly interesting pair of dedications are the churches of Saint Olave at either end of London Bridge, whose destruction he initiated to prevent the advance of invading armies.

Other saints became known across particular geographical areas, and their church dedications reflect that. Saint Kentigern, who reputedly originated in Cumberland has ten churches dedicated to him – nine in Cumberland and one in neighbouring Northumberland. Similarly the many churches dedicated to Saint Chad are clustered across Mercia in the former diocese of Lichfield which he was instrumental in founding.

The patronage of particular professions by saints has also influenced choices. For example, most English coastal towns have a church dedicated to Saint Nicholas, patron saint of sailors and fisherman, and churches dedicated to Saint Giles, patron saint of beggars and cripples, are often found near the medieval gates of fortified towns. In a similar fashion, the choice of Saint Catherine was favoured by many institutions as she is also the patron saint of educators and philosophers.

A number of churches seem to have selected their patron according to the feast day on which the church was dedicated. Though these are often hard to discern, they include several churches dedicated to the Ascension or the Assumption.

== Most common dedications ==
The table lists the most common dedications in the Church of England. Note that churches with more than one patron saint are counted towards the totals of both.

Dedication	Number
St Mary	2368
All Saints	1467
St Peter	1327
St Michael	816
St Andrew	801
St Paul	667
Holy Trinity	600
St John the Baptist	573
St James	546
St Nicholas	436
Christ Church	392
St John the Evangelist	351
St John (ambiguous)	288
St Lawrence	245
St George	243
St Luke	242
St Margaret	235
St Mary Magdalene	226
St Mark	179
St Martin	179
St Bartholomew	178
St Thomas	178
St Leonard	174
St Giles	160
St Matthew	145
St Stephen	145
St Barnabas	139
St Helen	121
St Cuthbert	106
St Anne	103

Among other Biblical saints the following have dedications: St Philip (92), St Jude (37), St Gabriel (29), St James the Less (24), Holy Spirit (22), St Simon (19), Holy Innocents (18) and St Matthias (16).

A number of churches are dedicated to Jesus by other names: as well as the 392 Christ Churches listed above, there are 80 St Saviours, 69 Emmanuels, 62 Good Shepherds, 18 Christ the Kings, and 12 Saviours.
