= Episcopal Diocese of Arizona =

Diocese of the Episcopal Church in the United States

Coordinates: 33.4589°N 112.0769°W

Diocese of Arizona Diœcesis Arizonensis

Location
- Country: United States
- Ecclesiastical province: Province VIII

Statistics
- Congregations: 58 (2024)
- Members: 16,433 (2023)

Information
- Denomination: Episcopal Church
- Established: 1959
- Cathedral: Trinity Cathedral

Current leadership
- Bishop: Jennifer Anne Reddall

Map
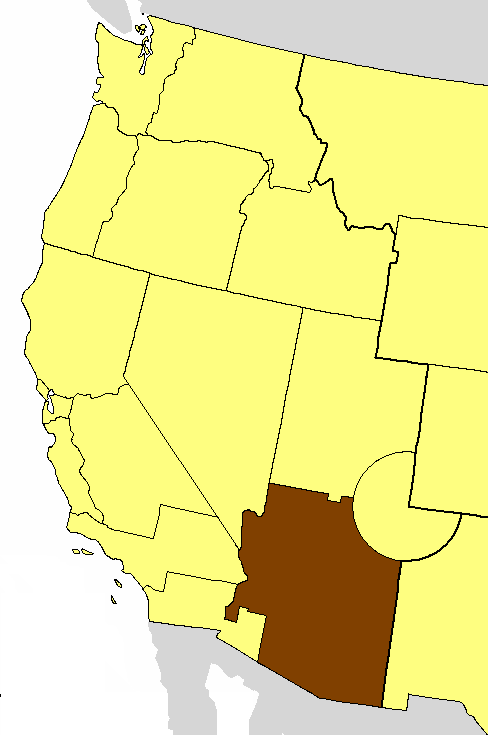
- Location of the Diocese of Arizona

Website
- www.azdiocese.org

The Episcopal Diocese of Arizona is the diocese of the Episcopal Church in the United States of America which has jurisdiction over most of Arizona. It is in Province VIII.

While it was just a missionary district for many decades, it was headed by important clerics. Bishop Ozi William Whitaker later became Bishop of Pennsylvania. Bishop Julius W. Atwood died two days before his old friend, President Franklin D. Roosevelt, who Vice-President Harry S Truman expected to attend his funeral. Arthur B. Kinsolving had served as the chaplain at the University of Virginia and West Point, and as Dean of the Cathedral of the Incarnation in Garden City, New York.

Jennifer Anne Reddall is the current bishop. Her seat is at Trinity Cathedral, Phoenix.

In 2024, the diocese reported average Sunday attendance (ASA) of 5,232 persons, a relative decline from 8,426 in 2015. It reported plate and pledge income of $16,108,160. Between 2015 and 2021, reported membership declined from 21,295 to 16,433. No membership statistics were reported in 2024 national parochial reports.

== History ==
The Episcopal Diocese of Arizona was established by General Convention in 1959, but its history began 100 years before. Here are some important dates:

- February 15, 1860: Joseph C. Talbot consecrated at Christ Church, Indianapolis to be Missionary Bishop over the newly organized Northwest jurisdiction, covering nearly 900,000 square miles (2,300,000 km^{2}), including Nebraska, the Dakotas, Wyoming, Colorado, New Mexico, Arizona, Utah, Montana and Idaho.
- 1865: Arizona and Nevada were constituted a Missionary Jurisdiction.
- 1874: Arizona is separated from Nevada and is joined into a Missionary Jurisdiction with New Mexico.
- 1880: The first convention of the Missionary District of New Mexico and Arizona was held at the Exchange Hotel, Albuquerque, New Mexico.
- 1881: St. Paul's, the first Episcopal church building in Arizona was erected in Tombstone with help from Endicott Peabody. St. Paul's is the oldest non-Roman Catholic Church in Arizona.
- 1889: Trinity Church in Phoenix was completed and held its first service on the first Sunday in January.
- 1892: Arizona and New Mexico were made separate Missionary Jurisdictions.
- 1897: The Hospital of the Good Shepherd was founded by Miss Thackara among the Navajos at Fort Defiance.
- 1907: St. Luke's Home for tubercular patients was founded in Phoenix.
- August 18, 1931: The Arizona Church Conference Center (Chapel Rock was added to the name in 1995) was bought and paid for with $13,972.85 by Bishop Mitchell.
- 1959: The Episcopal Diocese of Arizona was established by General Convention.

== List of Bishops of Arizona ==
Missionary bishops over Arizona
From	Until	Incumbent	Notes (Personal data)
1875	1876	Joseph C. Talbot, Missionary Bishop of the Northwest	1816, Alexandria, VA – 1883, Indianapolis, IN; consecrated 1860 at Christ Church, Indianapolis.
1869	1874	Ozi William Whitaker, Missionary Bishop of Arizona and Nevada	1830, New Salem, MA – 1911; consecrated 1869; first Episcopal Visitations to Arizona in 1873; translated to Pennsylvania.
1875	1876	William Forbes Adams, Missionary Bishop of Arizona and New Mexico	1833, Enniskillen, UK – 1935, Los Angeles, CA; consecrated 1875; translated to Easton.
1876	1880	John Franklin Spalding, Bishop of Colorado	1828, Belgrade, ME – 1902, Erie, PA; also acting Missionary Bishop; previously Missionary Bishop of Colorado.
1880	1888	George Kelly Dunlop, Missionary Bishop of Arizona and New Mexico	1830, County Tyrone, UK – 1888; consecrated 1880.
1889	1910	John Mills Kendrick, Missionary Bishop of Arizona and New Mexico	1836, Gambier, OH – 1911, Oceanside, CA; consecrated 1889.
1911	1925	Julius W. Atwood, Missionary Bishop of Arizona	1857, Salisbury, VT – 1945, Washington, DC; consecrated 1911.
1926	1945	Walter Mitchell, Missionary Bishop of Arizona	Consecrated 1926.
1945	1959	Arthur B. Kinsolving II, Missionary Bishop of Arizona	1894, Brazil – 1964; consecrated 1945; diocesan bishop from 1959.
Bishops of Arizona
1959	1962	Arthur B. Kinsolving	Missionary Bishop since 1945.
1962	1979	Joseph M. Harte	1914, Springfield, OH – 1999, Phoenix, AZ; previously suffragan bishop in Dallas.
1979	1992	Joseph T. Heistand	1924, Danville, PA – 2008, Richmond, VA; consecrated 1976 at St Francis Xavier Catholic Church, Phoenix.
1985	1988	Wesley Frensdorff, coadjutor bishop	1926, Hannover, Germany – 1988, Grand Canyon, AZ; previously Bishop of Nevada (1972–1983); interim Bishop of Navajoland (1983–1985); died in office in an airplane crash.
1992	2004	Robert R. Shahan	b. 1939, Elkhart, KS; consecrated in 1992 at St Francis Xavier Catholic Church, Phoenix.
2004	2019	Kirk Stevan Smith	b. 1951, Soap Lake, WA; consecrated 2004 at St Francis Xavier Catholic Church, Phoenix; seated 2004 Trinity Cathedral.
2019	present	Jennifer Anne Reddall	b. 1975, Santa Monica, CA; consecrated 2019 at Church of the Nations, Phoenix; seated 2019 Trinty Cathedral.
