= George Herbert Kinsolving =

Bishop of Texas (1849–1928)

The Right Reverend George Herbert Kinsolving
- Bishop of Texas
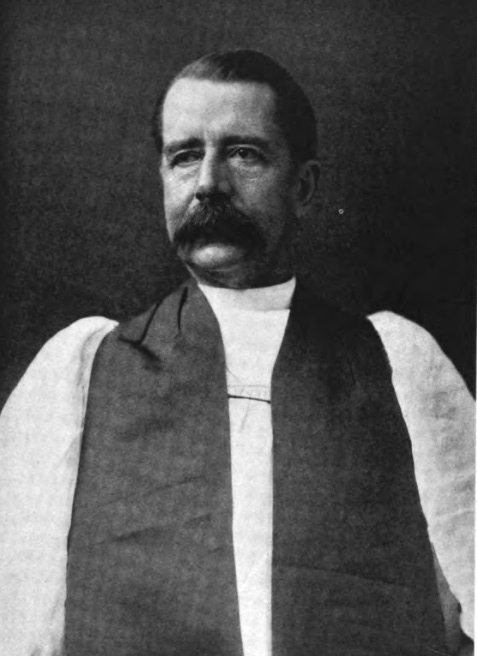
- Church: Episcopal Church
- Diocese: Texas
- Elected: May 19, 1892
- In office: 1893–1928
- Predecessor: Alexander Gregg
- Successor: Clinton S. Quin
- Previous post: Coadjutor Bishop of Texas (1892–1893)

Orders
- Ordination: 1875 by William Rollinson Whittingham
- Consecration: October 12, 1892 by Richard Hooker Wilmer

Personal details
- Born: April 28, 1849 Bedford County, Virginia, United States
- Died: October 23, 1928 (aged 79) Austin, Texas, United States
- Buried: All Saints Church, Austin, Texas
- Denomination: Anglican
- Parents: Ovid Americus Kinsolving & Julia Heiskell Krauth
- Spouse: Grace Jaggar (m. 1879; died 1925)
- Children: 1

George Herbert Kinsolving (April 28, 1849 – October 23, 1928) was an American religious leader who was the second bishop of the Episcopal Diocese of Texas, serving from 1893 to 1928.

== Early life and family ==
Kinsolving was born on April 28, 1849, in Bedford County, Virginia. He came from a family of clergymen. His father, the Reverend Ovid Americus Kinsolving (1822–1894), minister at St. John's Episcopal Church in Halifax, Virginia became an avid Confederate, especially supporting Mosby's Rangers although G.H. Kinsolving's brother joined the Richmond Howitzers light artillery. The family of his father's second wife likewise supported the Confederacy (her father Asa Rogers became a local militia general), and after her death from complications of childbirth, Otis Kinsolving was imprisoned for treason by occupying Union forces. The child whose birth led to that death, Lucien Lee Kinsolving (1862–1929), later became the first missionary bishop of Brazil, and G.H. Kinsolving preached the sermon at the consecration ceremony attended by twelve bishops. His other half-brother by his father's second wife, the Rev. Arthur Barksdale Kinsolving (1861–1961), also became known as an author and historian in Maryland. His half-brother by his father's third wife, the Rev. Wythe Leigh Kinsolving, served Episcopal churches in the South and New York City. Whereas his father's family were prominent Episcopalians, his mother's family, the Krauths, were devout Lutherans.

== Education and Ordained Ministry ==
Kinsolving was a student at the University of Virginia between 1868 and 1870, after which he taught a year in a boys' school near Baltimore. He later studied at the Virginia Theological Seminary from where he graduated in 1874. In 1892 he was awarded an honorary Doctor of Sacred Theology by Griswold College in Davenport, Iowa, and a Doctor of Divinity in 1893 by the University of the South.

He was the ordained deacon on June 26, 1874, by Bishop John Johns of Virginia and then priest in 1875 by Bishop William Rollinson Whittingham of Maryland. He initially served as assistant at Christ Church in Baltimore between 1874 and 1875, and then rector of St Mark's Church, Baltimore from 1875 until 1878. In 1878, he became rector of St John's Church in Cincinnati, while in 1881 he transferred to the Church of the Epiphany in Philadelphia where he remain until 1892. He married Grace Jaggar on October 8, 1879, and they had one child.

== Episcopacy ==
On May 19, 1892, Kinsolving was elected Coadjutor Bishop of Texas, and was consecrated on October 12, 1892, at the Church of the Epiphany by Bishop Richard Hooker Wilmer of Alabama as chief consecrator. He succeeded as diocesan bishop on July 11, 1893, and remained in office until his death in 1928. While bishop in Texas, he oversaw the establishment of All Saints' Episcopal Church by the campus of the University of Texas at Austin; his crypt is beneath the church's altar.
