= Wythe Leigh Kinsolving =

American Episcopal clergyman

Wythe Leigh Kinsolving (November 14, 1878 – December 21, 1964) was an American Episcopal priest, writer, poet, Democratic Party political advocate, sometime pacifist, and anti-Communist. He wrote nine books and dozens of letters and op-ed essays for the New York Times, the Washington Post, and regional papers. He gave an invocation for a national audience at the 1924 Democratic National Convention. Prior to the Pearl Harbor attack in 1941, he strongly opposed going to war against Nazi Germany.

== Early life and education ==
Kinsolving was born in Halifax, Virginia, the son of the Rev. Ovid Americus Kinsolving (1822-1894), who had been imprisoned for his Confederate oratory during the Civil War, and his third wife, Roberta Elizabeth Cary, a granddaughter of John Mathews. Three of Kinsolving's half-brothers also became clergymen; his half-brother George Herbert Kinsolving became the Episcopal bishop of Texas. He attended the Episcopal High School in Alexandria, Virginia in 1897.

Wythe Leigh Kinsolving received an M.A. degree from the University of Virginia, Charlottesville, Va., in 1902, and a B.D. degree from Virginia Theological Seminary, Alexandria, Va., in 1906. That same year, he married Annie Laurie Pitt, daughter of the Rev. Dr. Robert Healy Pitt, editor-in-chief of a leading Southern Baptist periodical, the Religious Herald.

== Career and politics ==
In 1906, he became rector at Church of the Epiphany in Barton Heights, Richmond, Va., but resigned this position two years later.

In December 1908, newspapers around the country reported that Kinsolving had confronted his father-in-law over questions the latter raised about his mental health, that the two ministers had a fist fight, and that he had resigned the Epiphany pulpit as a result. Kinsolving denied that he had hit anyone, and stated that his resignation was to take other work.

He went on to serve several other Episcopal churches in Maryland, Missouri, and Tennessee, before going to Europe for World War I relief work in 1917-18, under the auspices of the YMCA. He published a book of poetry and essays, From the Anvil of War, reflecting his experiences abroad, and his desire for all Christians to be united into a single world church.

=== Democratic Party politics in New York ===
In 1918, he moved to New York City and worked in various churches there, and served as Chaplain of the Virginian Society. He was often quoted in news reports; his letters and op-ed articles on political and religious topics were frequently published in the New York Times and other papers.

Prior to World War I, he expressed moderate pacifist views, but strongly supported President Woodrow Wilson. Following the war, he advocated for the League of Nations, and defended Wilson's legacy.

Citing his own Southern roots and loyalties, he upheld the honor of the South, but he also defended Abraham Lincoln.

Within the Protestant Episcopal Church, he was a critic of advocates for more lenient rules on divorce, and opposed a resolution praising President Herbert Hoover's handling of the economy.

He was a supporter of Sen. Oscar Underwood of Alabama for president. Like Underwood, Kinsolving was critical of the Ku Klux Klan, which then played a significant role in mainstream politics.

On July 8, 1924, he offered the invocation at the opening of the 21st session of the deadlocked 1924 Democratic National Convention, calling on the delegates to put aside "all bigotry, all intolerance, all racial or sectional or denominational smallness of nature," and for the candidates "to sacrifice any selfish egotism for party harmony, to sacrifice personal ambition for the national good."

During the 1928 campaign, Kinsolving strongly supported the Democratic nominee, New York Gov. Alfred E. Smith, defending him against criticism of his Roman Catholic faith and his opposition to Prohibition, and traveled to various states making speeches on behalf of Smith.

After Franklin Roosevelt took office as president in 1933, Kinsolving supported his center-left agenda. At a political round table conference at the University of Virginia's Institute of Public Affairs in 1935, he was quoted as saying, "If I were not a clergyman, I would say, 'Damn the opponents of the New Deal;' they don't know what they are talking about."

=== Isolationism and Anti-Communism ===
By the late 1930s, however, his political views turned towards foreign policy isolationism. He opposed the Spanish Republicans, comparing them to the Russian Bolsheviks. He endorsed Neville Chamberlain's attempt to appease Nazi Germany in the Munich conference. Soon, he was openly defending Germany and Hitler, and opposing any U.S. involvement on behalf of Britain.

In a sharp reversal from a few years earlier, he predicted that Franklin Roosevelt would become "a sort of dictator"; he described 1940 Republican presidential nominee Wendell Willkie approvingly as "a man inclined to peace." Shortly after the fall of France to German Nazi forces, he wrote of the American reaction to the news as "the hysteric period when Hitler Phobia developed into a national menace."

In March 1941, the Roosevelt Administration embarked on the Lend-Lease program, to aid the war effort of Britain and its allies. Kinsolving was opposed to this. He wrote that the British Empire "was built in bloodshed, brutal onslaughts, seizure of lands -- Canada and India, South Africa, Nova Scotia, etc." He ridiculed opposition to Hitler for doing the same: "He becomes Satan! And all his hosts are demons!"

Once the U.S. entered the war in late 1941, Kinsolving fell silent; his op-ed pieces and letters to newspapers stopped appearing for several years.

By the end of World War II, he relocated to Charlottesville, Virginia. He eventually resumed writing about the dangers of atheistic Communism.

He died in 1964, and is buried in Hollywood Cemetery in Richmond, Virginia.

== Books by Wythe Leigh Kinsolving ==
- The River of Thought and other verses. Winchester, Tenn.: Southern Printing and Publishing, 1915.
- From the Anvil of War. Winchester, Tenn.: Southern Printing and Publishing, 1919.
- Liberty bonds: a study of the League of Nations. Winchester, Tenn.: Southern Printing and Publishing, c.1919.
- Thoughts on Religion. New York: Gorham Book Sellers, c.1923
- Tapestry: Lyrics by Wythe Leigh Kinsolving. Richmond, Va., c.1929.
- Early history of Virginia and Maryland and seven centuries of lines. Richmond, Va., 1935
- That they may be one: a poem of the church. Charlottesville, Va., c. 1938
- The world and Virginia. Charlottesville, Va., 1943
- Discovery: poems of creation, history, and literature. Charlottesville, Va.: Jarman Press, 1951
