= Trinity Cathedral (Phoenix, Arizona) =

Episcopal cathedral

Coordinates: 33.458611°N 112.074722°W

Trinity Episcopal Cathedral
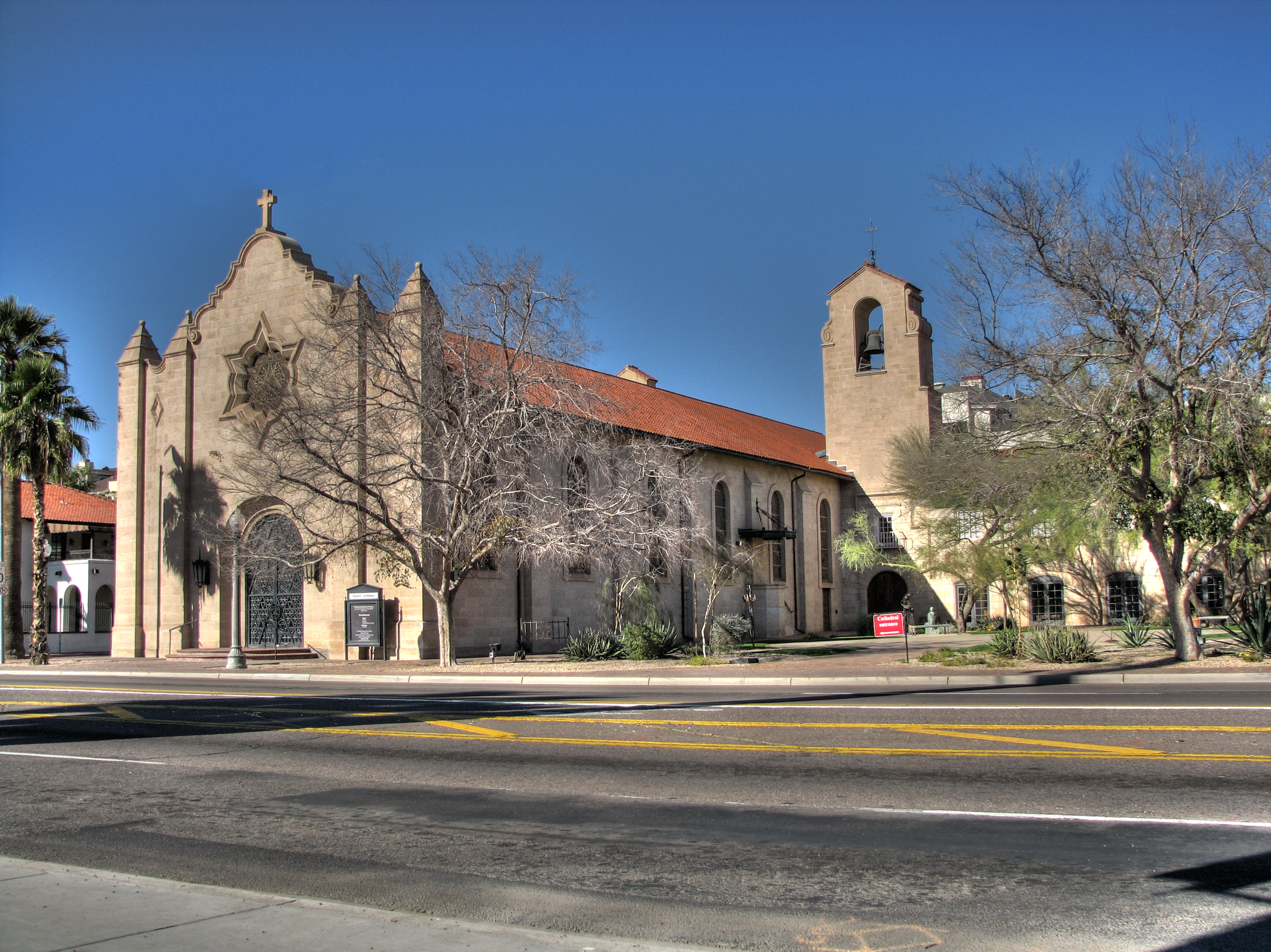
- Trinity Cathedral
- Trinity Episcopal Cathedral
- Location: Phoenix, Arizona
- Address: 100 W Roosevelt St
- Denomination: Episcopal
- Website: https://trinitycathedral.com/

History
- Founded: 1885
- Consecrated: April 1, 1921

Architecture
- Architect(s): Shepley, Rutan and Coolidge, Charles Allerton Coolidge
- Years built: 1915, 1920, 1931

Administration
- Diocese: Episcopal Diocese of Arizona

Clergy
- Bishop: Jennifer Reddall
- Dean: Erika von Haaren

Trinity Cathedral is an Episcopal cathedral located at 100 West Roosevelt Street in Phoenix, Arizona, in the historic Roosevelt district.

In 2021, the church reported 753 members; in 2025, it reported 410 members. Plate and pledge financial support reported by the church in 2025 was $671,993. Average Sunday Attendance (ASA) reported in 2025 was 200 persons. This was a relative decrease from ASA of 290 persons reported in 2016.

== History ==
Construction of the original Trinity Church located at 2nd Avenue and Washington Streets was announced in 1885. In 1914 new property was purchased at West Roosevelt Street and 1st Avenue. Plans were completed by the firm of Shepley, Rutan and Coolidge of Boston with Charles Allerton Coolidge donating plans to relocate the church. A quadrangle model was adopted to form the cathedral close. The quadrangle consists of the cathedral nave on the west side with a south facing entrance, the Cathedral House at the back (north) side and Atwood Hall forming the east side. All the buildings are faced in Tufa Limestone. The first portion of the church to be built was the Cathedral House with construction starting in July 1914 and being completed in late 1915. Construction of the cathedral nave began in January 1920 and the first service in the new structure was held Christmas Day 1920. The last portion Atwood Hall was designed by V. O. Wallingford of Wallingford & Bell Architects. It was completed in 1931 by the Egan Construction Company thus completing the quadrangle. Trinity was consecrated on April 1, 1921 by Bishop Joseph Horsfall Johnson of Los Angeles.

By the 1960s Trinity Cathedral had fallen into disrepair. The idea of moving the parish to a suburban location like many other churches in the area had done was brought up. Ultimately the decision was made to retain the current property and in response the parish began a series of improvements and modernization. Most notably stained glass windows were installed in the cathedral. Designed by Gildden Parker of the Glassart Studio in Scottsdale, the windows which include two rose windows depict certain theological ideas. These were built and installed in 1966-67. Parker later designed new cathedral doors built of wrought iron and glass. The iron doors from a series of triangles which represent the tree of life.

In 1914, Trinity Parish was designated to serve as the pro-cathedral for the Missionary Jurisdiction of Arizona and following the designation of the missionary jurisdiction as a diocese in 1959, Trinity became the fourth true cathedral of the Episcopal Church under the full control of the bishop and chapter in 1988, joining Grace Cathedral of San Francisco, the Cathedral of St. John the Divine in New York City and the Cathedral of Sts. Peter and Paul in Washington, D.C. Most US cathedrals of the Episcopal Church in the United States (as was Trinity Cathedral from 1914 to 1988) are parishes designated as pro-cathedrals appointed to serve as the seat (cathedra) for the bishop.

In March 2001 Trinity completed a restoration of the cathedral space which included restoration of the original redwood barrel ceiling above the altar. On October 10, 2002 a fire caused by a match in a trash can broke out in the cathedral destroying the north rose window, organ, piano and much of the recently restored redwood ceiling above the altar. Smoke filled the cathedral as well as the Cathedral House and Atwood Hall. While fire damage was mostly contained to the chancel/altar area smoke and water was present throughout the nave. Vada Roseberry a parishioner and local artist designed a new similar north rose window to replace the original. Restoration took several years and the cathedral was rededicated on April 1, 2005.

The church served as the base of several Episcopal missions in the metro Phoenix area. These included St. Andrew's Episcopal Church, Glendale, AZ; All Saints' Episcopal Church, Phoenix, AZ; St. Paul's Episcopal Church, Phoenix, AZ (today San Pablo Mission), and Christ Church of the Ascension, Paradise Valley, AZ.

== Music and arts ==
The cathedral organ, built by the Schantz Organ Company of Orrville, Ohio, is a four manual 71-rank pipe organ. It replaced a smaller organ destroyed in the 2002 fire. In addition to being an integral part of worship services, it is also used by organ students at Arizona State University. The cathedral piano is a hand-crafted Bösendorfer concert grand from Vienna, Austria.

Trinity Cathedral hosts concerts and exhibits in the Olney Gallery located on the lower floor of Cathedral House. The Olney Gallery is one of the participants of Phoenix's First Friday Art Walk.

== See also ==
- List of the Episcopal cathedrals of the United States
- List of cathedrals in the United States
