= St. Peter's Episcopal Church (Pittsburgh) =

Church in Pittsburgh, PA, USA

St. Peter's Protestant Episcopal Church
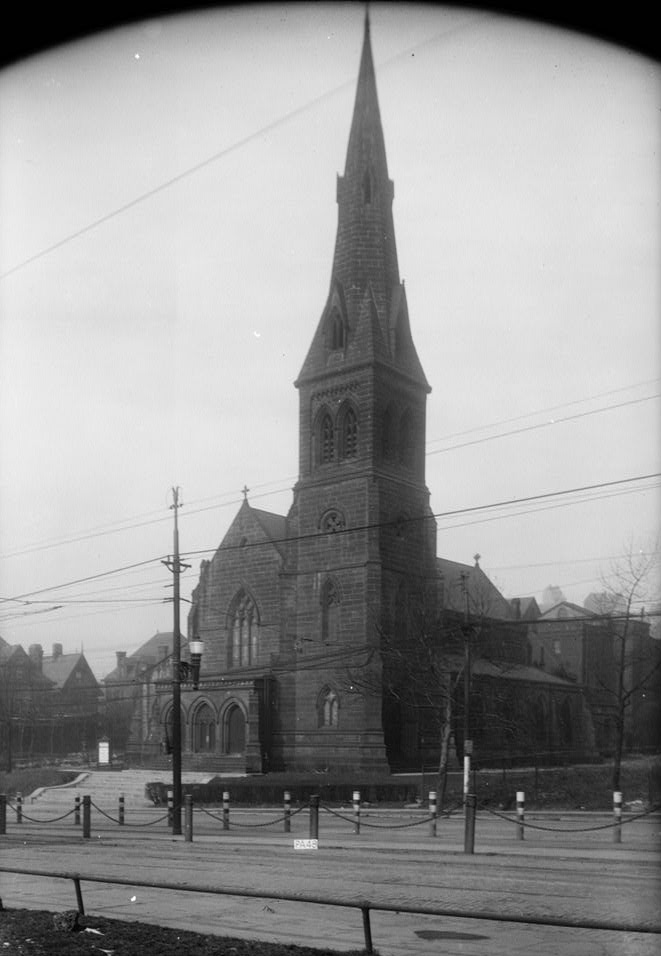
- St. Peter's at Forbes and Craft, Pittsburgh

Religion
- Affiliation: Episcopal
- Ecclesiastical or organisational status: deconsecrated 1986
- Year consecrated: 1851, reconstructed 1901
- Status: demolished

Location
- Location: Pittsburgh, Pennsylvania, U.S.A.
- Municipality: Pittsburgh
- State: Pennsylvania
- Interactive map of St. Peter's Protestant Episcopal Church
- Coordinates: 40°26′14.5″N 79°57′47″W

Architecture
- Architect: John Notman
- Type: parish church
- Style: archaeological phase of Gothic Revival

Specifications
- Spire: 1
- Materials: stone
- Pittsburgh Landmark – PHLF
- Designated: 1972

St. Peter's Episcopal Church in Pittsburgh, Pennsylvania, was an early example of the archaeological phase of Gothic Revival architecture, designed by the Philadelphia architect John Notman. It was originally built in 1851 at the corner of Grant and Diamond streets as a chapel of ease for Trinity Episcopal Church in the Diocese of Pittsburgh. The church and its site were purchased by Henry Clay Frick. The building itself was donated back to the congregation. It was dismantled, the stones numbered, and taken up Forbes Avenue in horsedrawn wagons to the corner of Forbes and Craft avenues, where it was reconstructed in 1901. It received a plaque from the Pittsburgh History and Landmarks Foundation. The church was deconsecrated in September 1989, and the building was demolished.
