= Bishop McConnell =

Bishop McConnell may refer to:

- Dorsey W. M. McConnell (b. 1953), American bishop in the Scottish Episcopal Church
- Francis John McConnell (1871–1953), American bishop in the Methodist Episcopal Church
