= Progressive Episcopalians of Pittsburgh =

Progressive Episcopalians of Pittsburgh (PEP), a member of the Via Media USA alliance, was a group of laypersons and clergy in the Episcopal Diocese of Pittsburgh that represents the interests of moderate to liberal churches and individuals within the diocese. The group was opposed to Bishop Robert Duncan.

Its members were instrumental in the formation of Via Media USA, and spoke for liberals throughout the church in the national media.

PEP has had several prominent members:

- The Rt. Rev. Walter Righter, who was tried for heresy for ordaining a gay man.
- Joan R. Gundersen, current president, historian and author, affiliate of Episcopal Women's History Project.
- Lionel Deimel, former president of PEP
- Christopher Wilkins, vice president and facilitator of Via Media USA.
- The Rev. Dr. Harold Lewis, Rector Emeritus of Calvary Church, Shadyside, which sued the Diocese of Pittsburgh for attempting to circumvent the Dennis Canon.
