= Ketlen A. Solak =

The Right Reverend Ketlen A. Solak
- Bishop of Pittsburgh
- Church: Episcopal Church
- Province: III
- Diocese: Diocese of Pittsburgh
- Elected: June 26, 2021
- Installed: November 14, 2021
- Predecessor: Dorsey W. M. McConnell
- Other posts: Associate Rector, St. Luke's Episcopal Church, Alexandria, Virginia (2005–2014); Rector, Brandywine Collaborative Ministries, Wilmington, Delaware (2014–2021)

Orders
- Ordination: June 18, 2005 (deacon); December 21, 2005 (priest)
- Consecration: November 13, 2021

Personal details
- Born: Port-au-Prince, Haiti
- Denomination: Anglican
- Spouse: Scott Solak
- Education: Catholic University of America; Virginia Theological Seminary

Ketlen Adrien Solak is a Haitian-American prelate of the Episcopal Church who serves as the ninth bishop of the Episcopal Diocese of Pittsburgh. Elected in 2021, she is the first woman and the first person of color to serve in that role.

== Early life and education ==
Ketlen Adrien was born and raised in Port-au-Prince, Haiti, in a devout Catholic family active in community service. She moved to the United States as a teenager to pursue her education, eventually earning both a Bachelor of Music and a Master of Music in piano performance from the Catholic University of America.

Her interest in scripture began in adolescence, culminating in a decision to read the entire Bible. She has cited Paul's Epistle to the Romans as instrumental in discerning her call to ordained ministry. Initially uncertain of this call as a Catholic woman, Solak later found resonance with the Episcopal Church and its liturgical and theological expression.

She earned a Master of Divinity in 2005 from Virginia Theological Seminary. She was ordained a deacon on June 18, 2005 and a priest on December 21, 2005 for the Diocese of Virginia.

== Early ministry ==
Following her ordination in the Episcopal Church, Solak served as associate rector of St. Luke’s Episcopal Church in Alexandria, Virginia, from 2005 until 2014. She then became the founding rector of Brandywine Collaborative Ministries in Wilmington, Delaware, a shared ministry of three congregations. At the same time, she earned a Doctor of Ministry in 2016 from Virginia Theological Seminary.

== Bishop of Pittsburgh ==
Solak was elected bishop of Pittsburgh on June 26, 2021, in a special diocesan convention held to select a successor to Bishop Dorsey McConnell. She was elected on the third ballot, receiving 56 percent of clergy votes and 54 percent of lay votes. She was ordained and consecrated on November 13, 2021, at Calvary Episcopal Church in Pittsburgh, and formally seated the following day at Trinity Cathedral.

In her acceptance speech, Solak characterized her ministry with the phrase "a Pittsburgher for Jesus," which became a popular slogan within the diocese. As bishop, she has emphasized reconnection and community rebuilding following the COVID-19 pandemic.

She is known for her musical background and often integrates song lyrics and hymns into her preaching, sometimes singing during services.

== Personal life ==
Solak met her husband, Scott Solak, while both were auditioning for Catholic University’s music program. They married and have been together for over forty years. The couple resides in Mt. Lebanon, a suburb of Pittsburgh, where Scott continues to teach music. They have a dog named Cinder.
