= Trinity Cathedral (Pittsburgh) =

Episcopal Church in Pennsylvania, US

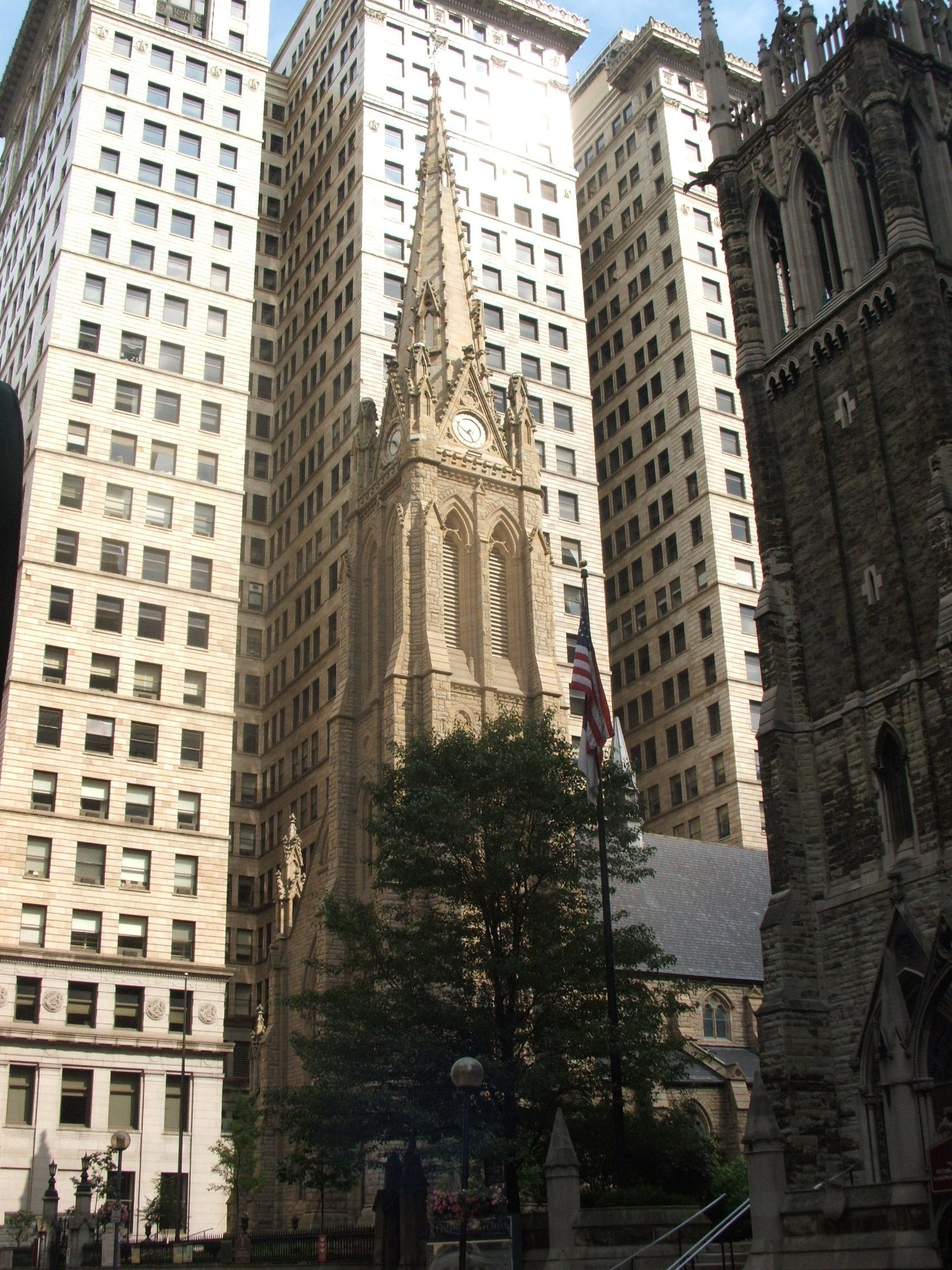

- Location of Trinity Cathedral in Pittsburgh
- 40.4413°N 79.9987°W
- Location: 322 Sixth Avenue, Downtown Pittsburgh, Pennsylvania

Administration
- Diocese: Diocese of Pittsburgh

Clergy
- Bishop: The Rt. Rev. Ketlen Solak
- Dean: (suspended) (vacant)

History
- Built: 1872

Site notes
- Architect: Gordon W. Lloyd
- Architectural style: Gothic Revival
- Governing body: Episcopal Church
- Website: www.trinitycathedralpgh.org

Pittsburgh Landmark – PHLF
- Designated: 1970

Trinity Cathedral is an Episcopal Church in downtown Pittsburgh, Pennsylvania and is the cathedral for the Episcopal Diocese of Pittsburgh.

The cathedral reported 131 members in 2025. Plate and pledge income for the congregation in 2025 was $202,255 with average Sunday attendance (ASA) of 64.

== Governance ==
A group of two ex officio members (the diocesan bishop and cathedral dean) and other elected members govern the congregation as the cathedral chapter; this includes three ordained clergy and four lay members of the diocese. In 2019, Bishop Dorsey McConnell appointed the Rev. Aidan E. Smith of Trinity Anglican Seminary in Ambridge as cathedral provost. On June 24, 2020, Smith was elected dean of the cathedral at a meeting of the Cathedral Chapter, a role which had been vacant since 2003. A formal installation was delayed by Covid 19 precautions around large gatherings for worship. Dean Smith was placed on administrative leave in early 2026 and arrested for retail theft and stolen property charges on February 27, 2026. As of October 21, 2026, the Episcopal Diocese of Albany listed Aidan Smith as canonically resident there. On March 14, 2026, Bishop Ketlen Solak announced the dean's resignation.

== History ==
The present Gothic church was completed in 1872 on the site of a hilltop cemetery on land deeded by heirs of Pennsylvania founder William Penn to the congregation's founders. The site, centered on a terrace above the historic point where the Allegheny River and the Monongahela River join to form the Ohio River was sacred to Native Americans as a burial ground. The Trinity Churchyard has the oldest marked graves west of the Atlantic Seaboard, of both Native American leaders and French, English, and American colonists.

== 1780s Round Church ==
The first Trinity Church was built two blocks to the west of this burial ground at the base of the hill or terrace. It was constructed from the 1780s to 1805. This first church was a brick building, octagonal in shape in the meeting-house style of architecture. It was known as “The Round Church.” It was situated on a sort of triangular lot with streets on each of the three sides, so that enlargement was out of the question."

A pencil sketch of the original building, attributed to a "Mr. Walter P. Marshall," from an 1895 article published in The Pennsylvania Magazine of History and Biography

== 1824 Cathedral ==
In 1824, Trinity moved to its current site in the middle of the terrace churchyard with what is regarded as the first Gothic structure in Western Pennsylvania. Bishop of Vermont and pro-slavery theologian John Henry Hopkins was the architect for the new building. He designed it to seat a thousand people. Hopkins' plans were adopted by the vestry without alteration. On May 1, the feast of St. Philip and St. James, the corner-stone was laid. The building was "brick, roughcast on the outside." The church was wide, with galleries on three sides, supported by slender cluster. The ceiling was "painted in imitation fan-vaulting." The growing congregation built the now-demolished St. Peter's Church as a chapel of ease. However, in 1869 the growing Trinity congregation erected a new structure.

== Current Cathedral ==
The current cathedral was designed by architect Gordon W. Lloyd in 1870–1871 with an exterior featuring English Gothic Style that was favored by mid-Victorian Episcopalians including a single central steeple and side transepts. The interior features a tall nave flanked by aisles and lit by clerestory windows. The nave walls are supported by clustered stone columns, and the austere interior ornamentation, in which the pointed arch predominates, is reminiscent of the work of the American Gothicist Richard Upjohn. Some of the stained glass windows in the nave were destroyed in a fire in 1967, and were replaced by new ones in a medieval style. All other windows date from 1872. The carved stone pulpit was built in 1922 to the design of the renowned American architect Bertram G. Goodhue.

In 2007, the cathedral exterior was cleaned for the first time in preparation for the Episcopal Diocese of Pittsburgh's 250th anniversary. The cleaning removed remnants of industrial soot dating to Pittsburgh's steel making days. The grime was causing acid runoff to deteriorate the exterior stonework.

== Anglican Realignment ==
In advance of the October 2008 schism, the Cathedral Chapter adopted a special resolution on July 24, 2008. It stated the Cathedral Chapter's intention "... neither to withdraw from The Episcopal Church nor to withdraw from a realigned Diocese of Pittsburgh." Over the next three years, the cathedral continued to be led by the Rev. Dr. Catherine Brall as Canon Provost and included elected representatives from both the continuing and departing dioceses; the cathedral's lay delegate had voice and vote in both the Episcopal and realigned Anglican diocesan conventions. The arrangement was terminated on December 15, 2011, when the Cathedral Chapter voted to reaffirm its original 1928 articles of incorporation which specified that Trinity Cathedral was an Episcopal congregation.

In June 2015, Bishop Dorsey W. M. McConnell restored Trinity Cathedral to the center of diocesan life by relocating diocesan offices to the downtown cathedral from the suburb of Monroeville. During denominational realignment, diocesan offices had been located in the Oliver Building between 1999-2009 and the Jonnet Building in Monroeville from 2009 to 2015.

== Notable clergy ==
Rectors

- John Henry Hopkins, rector 1823-1831, first bishop of Episcopal Diocese of Vermont and the eighth Presiding Bishop of the Episcopal Church; architect and pro-slavery biblical commentator
- Theodore B. Lyman, rector 1850-1860, fourth Bishop of the Episcopal Diocese of North Carolina
- John Scarborough, rector 1867-1875, bishop of the Episcopal Diocese of New Jersey from 1875 to 1914
- George Upfold, rector 1831-1849, first Bishop of Indiana

Deans

- Archibald Dixon Rollit (1912-2002), dean of cathedral 1964-1978, Canadian Army chaplain during World War Two
- George L.W. Werner (1938-2023), dean of cathedral 1979-2000

== Musical recordings ==
- FAMILY MORNING PRAYER (Trinity Cathedral Choir, 1947)
- FAMILY EVENING PRAYER (Trinity Cathedral Choir, 1947)

== See also ==
- List of cathedrals in the United States
- List of the Episcopal cathedrals of the United States
