= Dorsey W. M. McConnell =

American Anglican bishop

The Right Reverend Dorsey W. M. McConnell
- Bishop of Pittsburgh
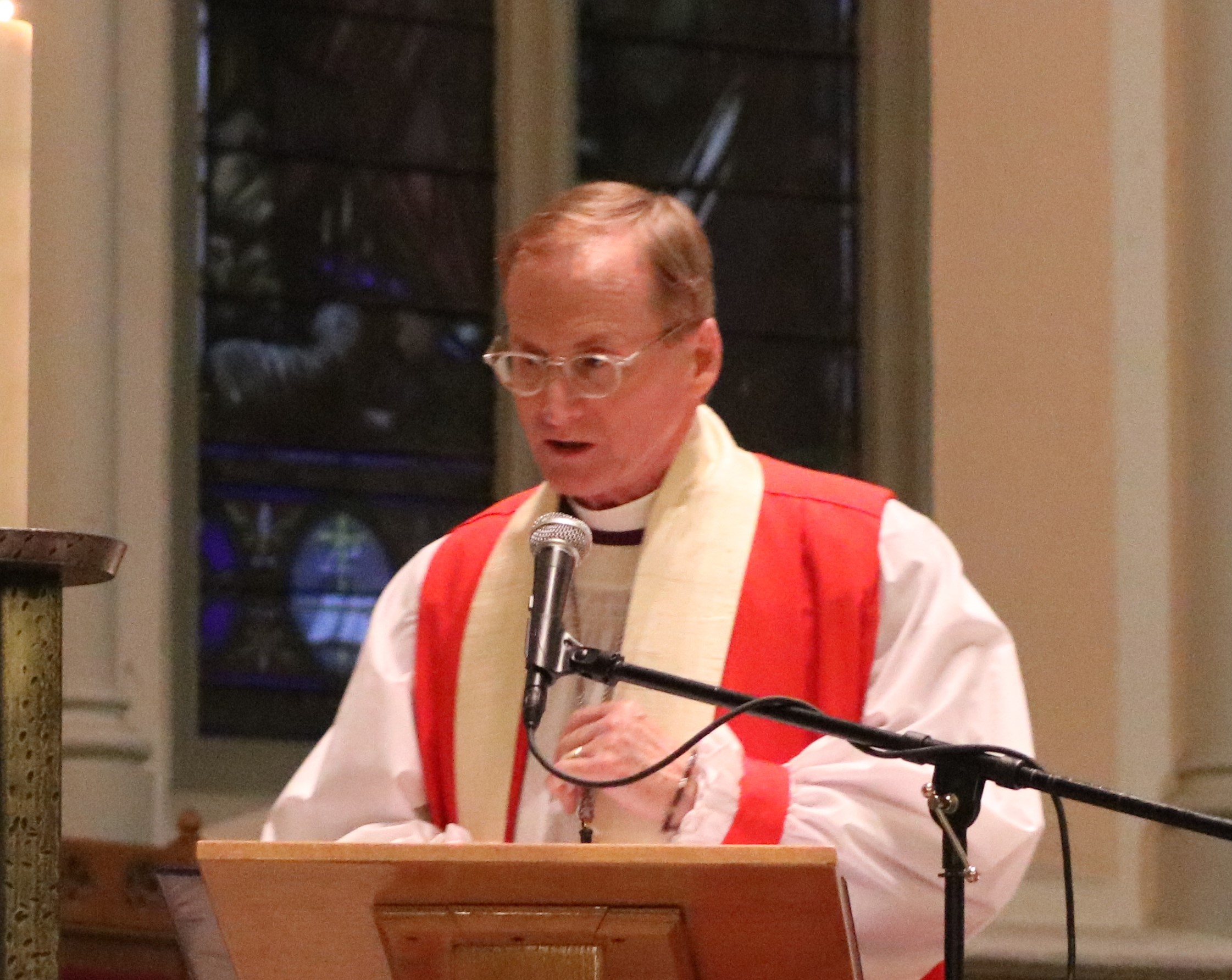
- Church: Episcopal Church
- Province: III
- Diocese: Diocese of Pittsburgh
- Elected: April 21, 2012
- Installed: November 9, 2012
- Retired: September 18, 2021
- Predecessor: Robert Duncan
- Successor: Ketlen A. Solak
- Other posts: Acting Bishop of Aberdeen and Orkney (2023–present); Rector, Church of the Redeemer, Chestnut Hill, Massachusetts (2004−2012)

Orders
- Ordination: 1983 (priest)
- Consecration: October 20, 2012 by Katharine Jefferts Schori

Personal details
- Born: Dorsey Winter Marsden McConnell; 1953 (age 72–73)
- Denomination: Anglican
- Spouse: Betsy
- Children: 1
- Education: Yale College; General Theological Seminary

Dorsey Winter Marsden McConnell (born 1953) is an American Anglican bishop who is the Acting Bishop of Aberdeen and Orkney in the Scottish Episcopal Church. He had served as bishop diocesan in the Episcopal Diocese of Pittsburgh from 2012 to 2021, succeeding Robert Duncan.

== Early life and ministry ==
McConnell was born into a military family and moved around often as a child. His father was U.S. Air Force General John Paul McConnell. Dorsey McConnell earned his bachelor's degree from Yale College and received a Fulbright scholarship for study in Paris. He then worked several jobs including being an actor and polo groom before marrying and enrolling at General Theological Seminary for his master of divinity.

McConnell was ordained a priest in 1983. He went on to become curate of St. Thomas, Manhattan; Chaplain for the Episcopal Church at Yale University, New Haven, Connecticut; Rector of Church of the Epiphany, Manhattan; and Rector of St. Alban's Church, Edmonds, Washington. In 2004, he was called to the rectorship of Church of the Redeemer, Chestnut Hill, in the Diocese of Massachusetts where he served until his election as Bishop of Pittsburgh.

== Election as bishop ==
On April 21, 2012 at a special convention held at Trinity Cathedral in downtown Pittsburgh, McConnell was elected eighth bishop diecesan. He became bishop-elect after receiving a majority of votes in both orders on the sixth ballot. He received 76% of clergy votes and 57% of lay votes. In addition to McConnell, the original slate of candidates included the Rev. Michael N. Ambler, Jr., rector of Grace Church, Bath, Maine; the Rev. R. Stanley Runnels, rector of St. Paul's Church, Kansas City, Missouri; and the Rev. Ruth Woodliff-Stanley, rector of St. Thomas Church, Denver, Colorado. A local priest, the Rev. Scott T. Quinn, rector of Church of the Nativity, Crafton, Pennsylvania, was added to the final slate by petition.

The election was significant as part of rebuilding the Episcopal diocese after the departure of many theological conservatives. Prior to his election, the Pittsburgh Post-Gazette reported McConnell had a record of advocating for theologically conservative concerns within liberal dioceses while still remaining loyal to the Episcopal Church. He also had experience working alongside both theological liberals and conservatives and churchmanship ranging between High Church Anglo-Catholics and Low Church practices. After receiving the required consents from bishops of jurisdiction and standing committees of other dioceses in the Episcopal Church, McConnell was consecrated bishop on October 20, 2012, by the Most Rev. Katharine Jefferts Schori, twenty-sixth Presiding Bishop of the Episcopal Church, at Calvary Church, Shadyside, Pittsburgh.

== Diocesan leadership ==
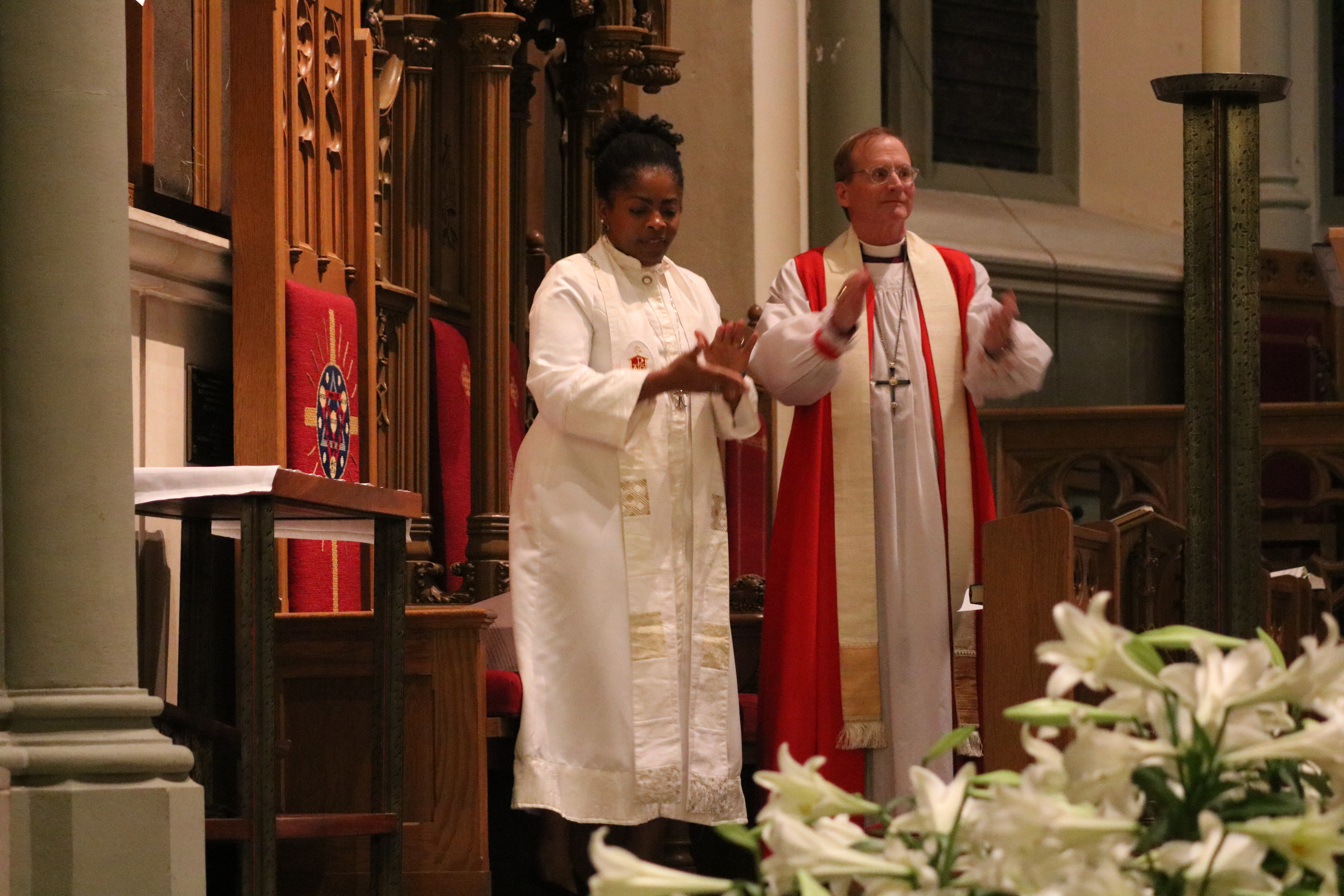
On the 50th anniversary of the death of the Rev. Dr. Martin Luther King Jr., Bishop Dorsey McConnell (right) presided over an ecumenical service at Trinity Cathedral honoring King. United Methodist Bishop Cynthia Moore-Koikoi (left) preached.

While Episcopal Bishop of Pittsburgh, McConnell's work focused on bridge-building in the "city of bridges". During his consecration, he declared being given a vision to build a new bridge for Pittsburgh, a "Bridge of the Angels". His unexpected acting from the pews garnered laughter and applause from the congregation of 1,000.

On one of the most divisive issues in the diocese, gay marriage, McConnell sought middle ground by allowing local options for parishes and priests to determine whether to perform same-sex marriages. In an August 2014 pastoral letter, McConnell wrote: "I know and treasure the theological diversity of this diocese, and know that practice in this matter will vary from parish to parish. ... I support the need for our clergy to be faithful to their own consciences, in choosing to use or not use the Rite, and hope as always that we will continue to regard one another with affection and respect across our differences ..." Simultaneously, McConnell expressed theological reservations about the lack of a Biblical warrant for same-sex marriage rites. In addition to establishing a traditional Anglican via media for the most divisive issue in the diocese, McConnell returned diocesan offices to their historical headquarters at Trinity Cathedral, downtown in June 2015. During the tumultuous years of Anglican realignment and related property lawsuits, diocesan offices were relocated to various office buildings in the region.

Since 2007, McConnell has helped direct Pilgrim Africa annually. The public health and education organization strives to eliminate malaria, war, and famine in Uganda. The bishop reflects on the experience at his blog, Iron City Bishop. During July 2016, Bishop McConnell's work with Pilgrim Africa focused on the village of Olwa.

== Seminary affiliations ==
In 2016, McConnell became increasingly active at Presbyterian-affiliated Pittsburgh Theological Seminary (PTS). He was named a member of the board of directors and was a presenter during inaugural festivities of school president David Esterline. In October 2016, the Rev. Canon Dr. Cathy Brall, then canon missioner for the Diocese of Pittsburgh and former provost of Trinity Cathedral, was named PTS's director of field education.

McConnell has been guest preacher at Episcopal Church seminaries. In December 2012, he delivered a sermon in the Chapel of the Good Shepherd at his alma mater, General Theological Seminary in New York City. He received an honorary doctorate from General Theological Seminary during its May 2013 commencement.

McConnell also preached during chapel at Trinity School for Ministry in September 2013. The conservative-leaning, evangelical school did not name McConnell to its board of trustees nor its board of visitors despite being the only Episcopal-affiliated seminary in the Diocese of Pittsburgh.

== See also ==
- List of Episcopal bishops of the United States
- List of bishops of the Episcopal Church in the United States of America
