= Episcopal Diocese of Pittsburgh =

Episcopal Church diocese in the US

Coordinates: 40.43910°N 79.76964°W

Diocese of Pittsburgh Dioecesis Pittsburgensis
- Seal of the Episcopal Diocese of Pittsburgh

Location
- Country: United States
- Territory: Allegheny, Armstrong, Beaver, Butler, Cambria, Fayette, Greene, Indiana, Somerset, Washington, and Westmoreland Counties, Pennsylvania
- Ecclesiastical province: III

Statistics
- Parishes: 33 (2024)
- Members: 8,527 (2023)

Information
- Denomination: Episcopal Church
- Established: November 15, 1865
- Cathedral: Trinity Cathedral
- Language: English

Current leadership
- Bishop: Ketlen A. Solak

Map
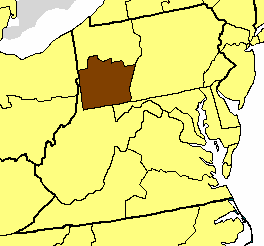
- Location of the Diocese of Pittsburgh, 325 Oliver Avenue, Suite 300, Pittsburgh, PA 15222

Website
- episcopalpgh.org

The Episcopal Diocese of Pittsburgh is a diocese in the Episcopal Church in the United States of America. Geographically, it encompasses 11 counties in Western Pennsylvania. It was formed in 1865 by dividing the Episcopal Diocese of Pennsylvania. The diocesan cathedral is Trinity Cathedral in downtown Pittsburgh. The Rt. Rev. Ketlen A. Solak was consecrated and seated as its current bishop in autumn 2021.

The diocese reported 9,089 members in 2021 and 8,527 members in 2023; no membership statistics were reported in 2024 parochial reports. Plate and pledge income for the 33 filing congregations of the diocese in 2024 was $5,606,328. Average Sunday attendance (ASA) in 2024 was 1,751 persons. This was a decrease from ASA of 2,380 persons attending Sunday worship in the diocese in 2017.

== Early history ==
The Diocese of Pittsburgh covers the southwestern corner of Pennsylvania and includes the current counties of Allegheny, Armstrong, Beaver, Butler, Cambria, Fayette, Greene, Indiana, Somerset, Washington, and Westmoreland. In the mid-18th century this rich transmontane area drew the first Indian traders, exploring surveyors, military men and later settlers, many of whom were at least nominal Anglicans primarily from Maryland, eastern Pennsylvania, and Virginia.

The earliest penetration of the southwest corner of the state, then sparsely populated with Indians, was made by Episcopalians who set up posts in the 1740s along the Allegheny, Youghiogheny and Ohio Rivers. Maryland surveyor Christopher Gist crossed the mountains to survey large claims of the best farm land. On Christmas Day in 1750, Gist read Prayers and delivered a homily to Indians and traders near what is now the town of Coshocton.

Young George Washington, already a Virginia vestryman, was guided by Gist when he came west to warn the French to withdraw from this region claimed by the British. The French refusal to leave led to invasion and capture of the tiny stockade built by Virginians at the future site of Pittsburgh in 1754. Washington read the burial office from the 1662 Prayer Book in 1755 when British churchman General Edward Braddock, fatally wounded while attempting to drive the French from Fort Duquesne at the Forks of the Ohio, was carried back over Chestnut Ridge and buried in the middle of the wagon tracks of what would become US 40 in Fayette County. The successful 1758 campaign of British churchman General John Forbes marked the end of French control of the region.

When the first new migrating settlers arrived in the 1760s, there were no settled Episcopal clergy. Laity read Morning Prayer, mainly in farm cabins but sometimes at Fort Burd or Fort Pitt, or in public houses as those were established. Before the American Revolution there were no organized Episcopal churches left anywhere in this corner of the state. Some of the more dedicated laity maintained Prayer Book worship in their homes until after the first convention of 1789, but they kept no records, elected no vestries, and built no houses for worship. From then until the 1820s, the leadership of the scattered congregations established was mainly in the hands of the few early ministers who sought ordination as Episcopalians and rode wide itinerant circuits.

The first known Episcopal services led by ordained clergy were conducted by Francis Reno. In 1794 he officiated alternately at Pittsburgh and Chartiers.

Other clergy resident in this western third of what was then Diocese of Pennsylvania included Robert Ayres, a Methodist ordained in 1789, residing at Brownsville, Fayette County; and Joseph Doddridge, a Methodist ordained in 1792, residing in Independence, Washington County. John Taylor, raised in Ireland and originally a Presbyterian, was ordained to the Episcopal ministry in 1794. He moved to Washington County in 1797 to teach school, and was soon invited to lead a small congregation in Pittsburgh. During the late eighteenth century, Doddridge was especially active, but unsuccessful, in advocating for a diocese comprising western Pennsylvania, western Virginia, and Ohio in the frontier Upper Ohio Valley.

In 1865, the Episcopal Diocese of Pennsylvania was divided, and the western part became known as the Diocese of Pittsburgh. John Barrett Kerfoot was the first bishop of the diocese, which then included 24 counties and 28 parishes. In 1910 approval was granted for the division of the Diocese of Pittsburgh into two dioceses, and the northern part became the Diocese of Erie (now the Diocese of Northwestern Pennsylvania). The Diocese of Pittsburgh took its current shape, covering the eleven counties of southwestern Pennsylvania.

== History ==
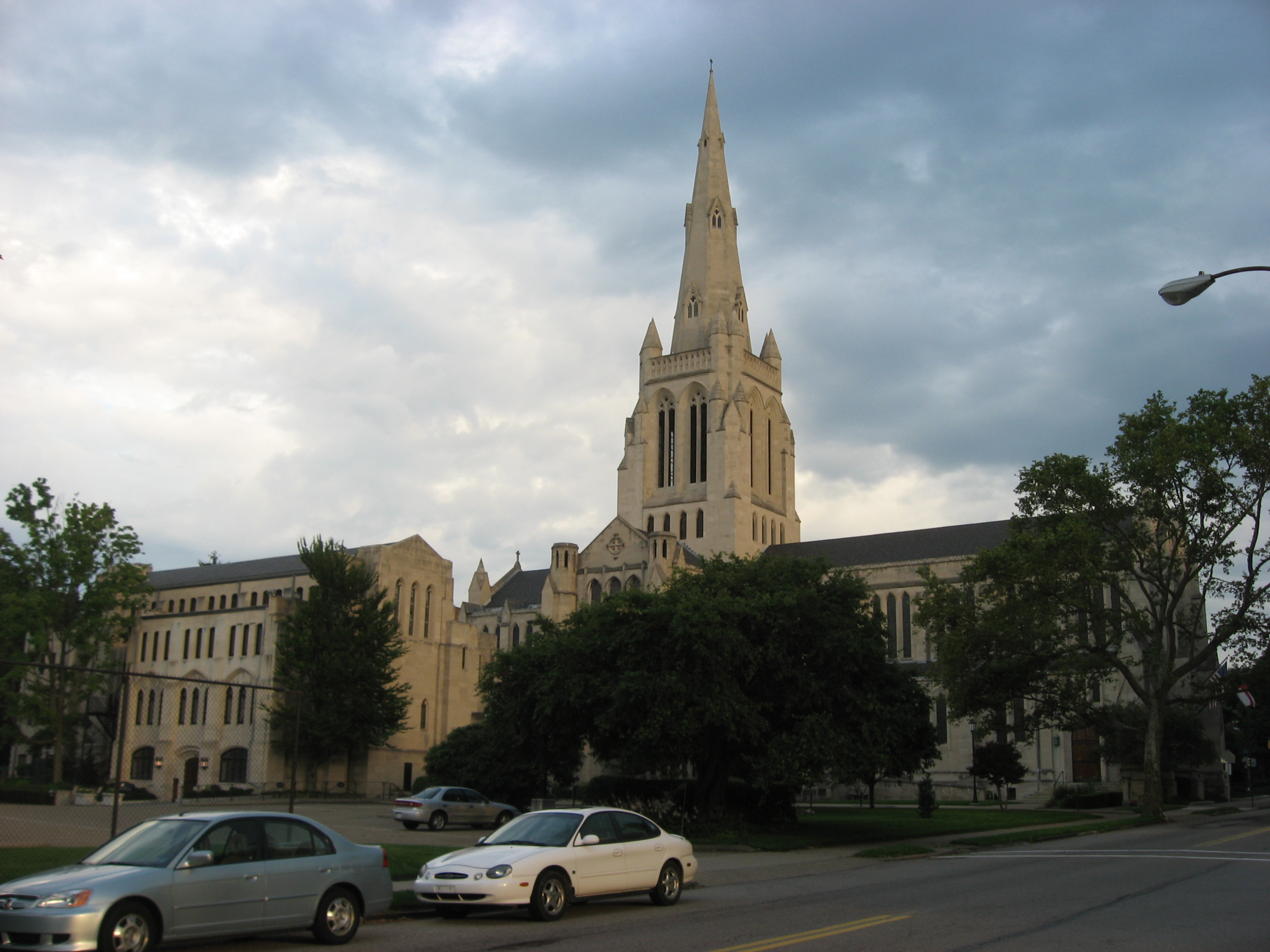
Calvary Episcopal Church

The Diocese grew under the successive leadership of Bishops John Barrett Kerfoot, Cortland Whitehead, Alexander Mann, Austin Pardue, and Robert Appleyard and developed several notable institutions: St. Margaret's Hospital, the Church Home (later Canterbury Place), St. Barnabas Community, and Sheldon Calvary Camp. The diocese was known for its work among miners and steelworkers, and as the steel industry began its collapse in Pittsburgh offered a variety of programs supporting workers. However, evangelicals targeted the diocese as the location for a new seminary, Trinity Episcopal School for Ministry, and spent much of the 1970s pushing the diocese towards the theological position favored by that group. By the 1990s they had changed the theological mix of the diocese. Under Bishops Alden Hathaway and Robert Duncan, St. Margaret's Hospital and Canterbury Place were turned over to control of University of Pittsburgh Medical Center (UPMC); St. Barnabas was released to an independent non-denominational board; Sheldon Calvary Camp became the last diocesan institution with a board closely tied to the diocese.

By 1990, the Diocese of Pittsburgh was a theologically conservative diocese within the Episcopal Church. Robert Duncan (elected in 1995) in particular had a prominent role in the conservative position within the national church. In 2003, he and a group of other conservative bishops walked out of the General Convention after the House of Bishops approved Gene Robinson's election as Bishop of New Hampshire. In January 2004, Duncan was elected the first moderator of the Anglican Communion Network.

In 2003, Calvary Episcopal Church in East Liberty sued the diocese and its bishops, Duncan and Scriven, specifically over actions taken by a special convention the diocese held after the Episcopal Church's 2003 General Convention. At the special convention, the diocese had passed a resolution that asserted that all property of individual parishes belonged to the parishes themselves, rather than to the diocese. In the suit, Calvary claimed that the diocese could not take such an action, as it violated the Dennis Canon which states that parish property is held in trust for the diocese and the national church. The parties signed a court-approved settlement in October 2005. The settlement confirmed that all diocesan property would remain the property of "The Episcopal Diocese of Pittsburgh of the Episcopal Church U.S.A." even if a majority of parishes left the Episcopal Church. It also created a process by which the diocese agreed to make decisions about property and assets should a congregation wish to leave the diocese.

On November 2, 2007, the Diocese of Pittsburgh annual convention voted to change its constitution to remove accession to the constitution and canons of the Episcopal Church. The vote was 118 to 58 in the lay order and 109 to 24 in the clergy order. Shortly after, a group of Episcopalians filed a formal complaint with the Episcopal Church and the Presiding Bishop also submitted a complaint charging that Bishop Duncan had abandoned the Episcopal Church and violated other canons. The committee designated by the Episcopal Church voted that the charges were substantive and the matter was put before the House of Bishops on September 18, 2008. The bishops deposed Duncan from ordained ministry on charges of abandoning the communion of the church.

Despite Duncan's removal, diocesan leadership went ahead on October 4, 2008 with the necessary second vote required to amend the diocesan constitution and canons. At that convention, 119 of 191 lay deputies and 121 of 160 clergy deputies voted on the second reading of constitutional changes intended to facilitate withdrawal from the Episcopal Church. In additional votes, canonical changes were approved that were intended to move the diocese into the Province of the Southern Cone. This is similar to what happened in the Episcopal Diocese of San Joaquin in 2007.

=== Reorganization ===
One member of the diocese's Standing Committee, the ecclesiastical authority in the absence of a bishop, remained in the Episcopal Church. That member, the Rev. James Simons, appointed two additional members to the Standing Committee and informed Presiding Bishop Katharine Jefferts Schori of the situation. On October 9, 2008, Jefferts Schori acknowledged the reorganized Standing Committee as the legitimate ecclesiastical authority of the Diocese of Pittsburgh.

The Right Rev. David Jones, a suffragan bishop of the Diocese of Virginia, began serving as a consulting bishop on October 23 to assist the diocese in its rebuilding efforts. A special meeting of the diocesan convention was held on December 13. Twenty-seven congregations actively participated in the convention. The convention voted unanimously that the recent canonical changes were null and void and affirmed the diocese's communion in the Episcopal Church. The Rt. Rev. Robert Hodges Johnson, the retired Bishop of Western North Carolina, accepted the call to serve as assisting bishop and to lead the diocese, for the near term. At the October 2009 convention, the Episcopal Diocese approved the call of the Rt. Rev. Kenneth Price, Bishop Suffragan of Southern Ohio as provisional bishop.

Calvary Episcopal Church had returned to court in December 2006 asking for enforcement of the stipulation paragraph guaranteeing that diocesan property would remain with a diocese in the Episcopal Church. Following the 2008 diocesan convention, the Episcopal Diocese and the Episcopal Church joined in that legal action. On October 5, 2009, the Court of Common Pleas ruled that the diocese in communion with the Episcopal Church is the legal successor, and on October 29, the rival diocese announced it had changed its name to the Anglican Diocese of Pittsburgh. In October 2009, the Commonwealth Court ruled that all diocesan property belonged to the Episcopal Diocese of Pittsburgh that was part of the Episcopal Church. In January 2010 the court received a schedule of property including an investment portfolio of over $20 million and the deeds to 49 properties including 22 occupied by congregations participating in the schismatic Anglican Church of North America. The Commonwealth Court of Pennsylvania affirmed the award of property February 2011 and refused to reconsider its ruling in March 2011.

The same day that the appellate Commonwealth Court issued its opinion, the Episcopal Diocese announced it had reached a property settlement with St. Philip's Church, Moon Township. One week later they announced a second settlement with Somerset Anglican Fellowship. On October 9, 2012 a third congregation announced a unique settlement with the Episcopal Diocese in which the diocese invested its equity in the building in the ministry to homeless veterans that constitutes the focus of Shepherd's Heart Fellowship. Shepherd's Heart remained a member of the Anglican diocese.

Trinity Cathedral was shared by both the Anglican diocese and the Episcopal diocese until December 2011, when the cathedral chapter voted to abide by its articles of incorporation which specified that the cathedral was an Episcopal congregation. That vote constituted a repudiation of the Special Resolution adopted in 2008, in which the then chapter affirmed its intention "neither to withdraw from The Episcopal Church nor to withdraw from a realigned Diocese of Pittsburgh." Over the next three years, the chapter included elected representatives from both dioceses and Jeremy Bonner served as a lay delegate to both Episcopal Church and ACNA diocesan conventions. In 2012 three of the parishes that originally chose to participate in the Anglican diocese resumed participation in the Episcopal Diocese. A fourth parish returned in 2013, and a fifth in 2016. Since the court decision ten Anglican congregations whose property was included in that decision have returned their buildings to the Episcopal Diocese and found other quarters. The diocese is rebuilding congregations at three of those buildings, plus one re-opened empty building recovered in the court decision. At the end of 2013 the diocese had 37 parishes and slightly over 9,000 baptized members. On March 1, 2018 the diocese announced an agreement had been reached with nine parishes participating in the ACNA diocese whose property titles ran in the name of the parish. The agreement confirms their titles but also recognized a beneficial trust interest of the Episcopal Diocese in all property held by the parishes on or before October 8, 2008. The Episcopal Diocese will receive a stipulated percentage payment from parish operating income as long as the parishes remain outside the Episcopal Church.

In February 2017, the Most Rev. Michael B. Curry held a revival in the diocese as part of The Presiding Bishop’s Pilgrimage for Reconciliation, Healing and Evangelism in Southwestern Pennsylvania. Bishop Curry's visit focused on evangelism and racial reconciliation with events scheduled at Calvary Church in East Liberty and Presbyterian-affiliated Pittsburgh Theological Seminary.

On February 20, 2026, the Episcopal Church's Executive Council endorsed the Diocese of Pittsburgh as the site of the 2030 General Convention.

== Roll of bishops ==
1. John Barrett Kerfoot (1866–1881)
2. Cortlandt Whitehead (1882–1922)
3. Alexander Mann (1923–1943)
4. Austin Pardue (1944–1968)
  * William S. Thomas (1953–1970), bishop suffragan
5. Robert B. Appleyard (1968–1983)
6. Alden Hathaway (1983–1997)
  * Robert Duncan (1995–1997), bishop coadjutor
7. Robert Duncan (1997–2008)
  * Henry Scriven, assistant bishop (2002–2008)
  * Robert Hodges Johnson, assisting bishop (2009)
  * Kenneth L. Price Jr., bishop provisional (2009–2012)
8. Dorsey W. M. McConnell (2012–2021)
9. Ketlen A. Solak (2021–present)

== See also ==
- Progressive Episcopalians of Pittsburgh
