= Calvary Episcopal Church (Pittsburgh) =

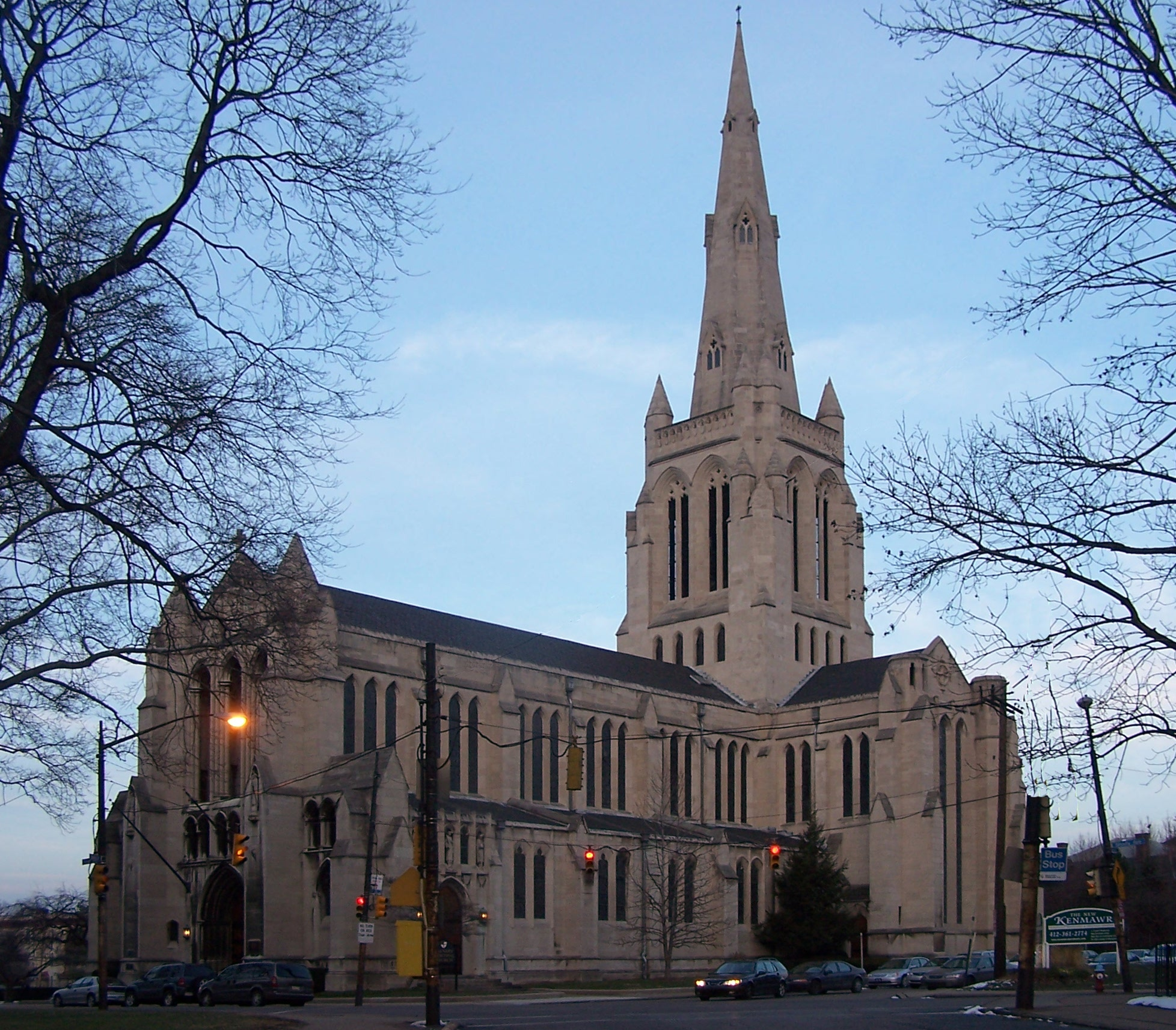

- Location of Calvary Episcopal Church in Pittsburgh
- 40.455977°N 79.922554°W
- Location: 315 Shady Avenue (at Walnut Street); Shadyside neighborhood of Pittsburgh, Pennsylvania

History
- Built: 1906

Site notes
- Architect: Ralph Adams Cram
- Architectural style: Gothic Revival
- Governing body: Episcopal Church
- Calvary Episcopal Church
- U.S. National Register of Historic Places
- Location: 315 Shady Ave., Pittsburgh, Pennsylvania
- Area: 2.5 acres (1.0 ha)
- Built: 1907
- Architectural style: Late Gothic Revival
- NRHP reference No.: 12000219
- Added to NRHP: April 18, 2012

Pittsburgh Landmark – PHLF
- Designated: 1969

Calvary Episcopal Church is a parish of the Episcopal Diocese of Pittsburgh, Pennsylvania. The parish was founded in 1855.

The church reported 1,562 members in 2015 and 1,674 members in 2023; no membership statistics were reported nationally in 2024 parochial reports. Plate and pledge income reported for the congregation in 2024 was $1,166,499. Average Sunday attendance (ASA) in 2024 was 253 persons.

== History ==
In 1854, Mrs. Mathilda Dallas Wilkins, a prominent East Liberty resident and the wife of Judge William Wilkins, requested unsuccessfully of Bishop Alonzo Potter, the third bishop of the Diocese of Pennsylvania, that an Episcopal parish be founded in East Liberty. Not to be deterred, Mrs. Wilkins spearheaded an organizational meeting for a new parish. The Rev. William Paddock agreed to lead regular services for a new congregation on the condition that an appropriate worship site was found. Rev. Paddock, along with thirteen others, then incorporated Calvary Episcopal Church, subsequently adopting a charter and by-laws. The first services of the new Calvary congregation were held in January 1855 in space rented from a German Lutheran Church. The building was located in an alley between Collins and Sheridan avenues in the Village of East Liberty. Within a year, Calvary bought this first building.

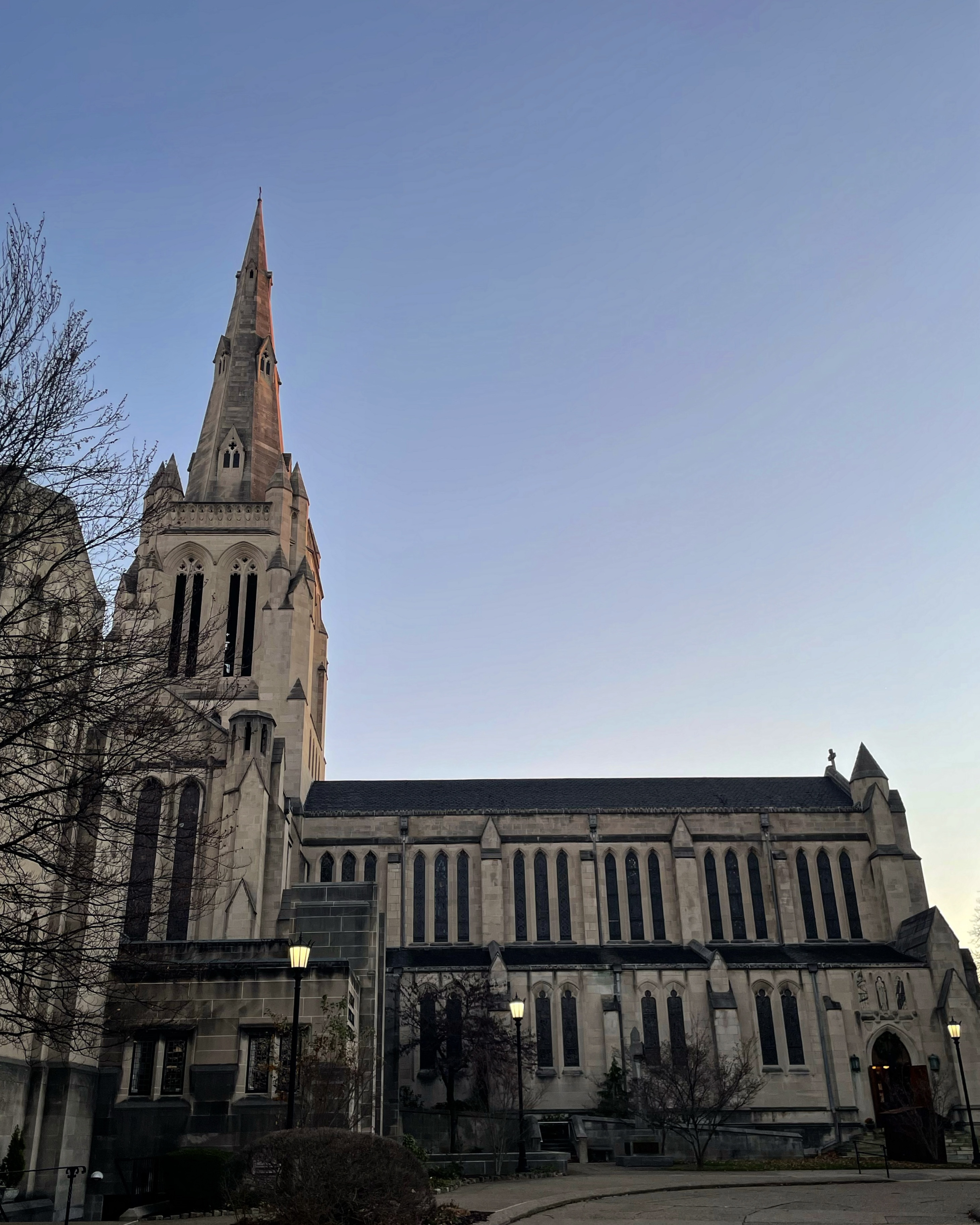
Calvary North Elevation

The Calvary congregation grew and, in 1861, decided to purchase a lot a few blocks east of its first site at the corner of Penn Avenue and Station Street. On this property Calvary built a Gothic revival church that featured a ribbed-vaulted ceiling and steeply pitched Victorian roof. The architect was Richard Upjohn; construction cost was $9,000, of which $4,000 was mortgaged. As the parish continued to grow, major additions were erected between 1870 and 1895. Calvary called its fourth rector, Boyd Vincent, in 1874 and the parish grew rapidly under his leadership. During this time, the church began new missions that continued long after his rectorship. By 1900, Calvary Episcopal Church was the largest and most influential parish in the Diocese of Pittsburgh. Calvary can be credited with the creation of several missions in the Pittsburgh region, sparked largely by Boyd Vincent, that eventually became established Episcopal parishes in Wilkinsburg (St. Stephen's), Oakland (Ascension), Mt. Lebanon (St. Paul's), and Fox Chapel (Fox Chapel Episcopal Church).

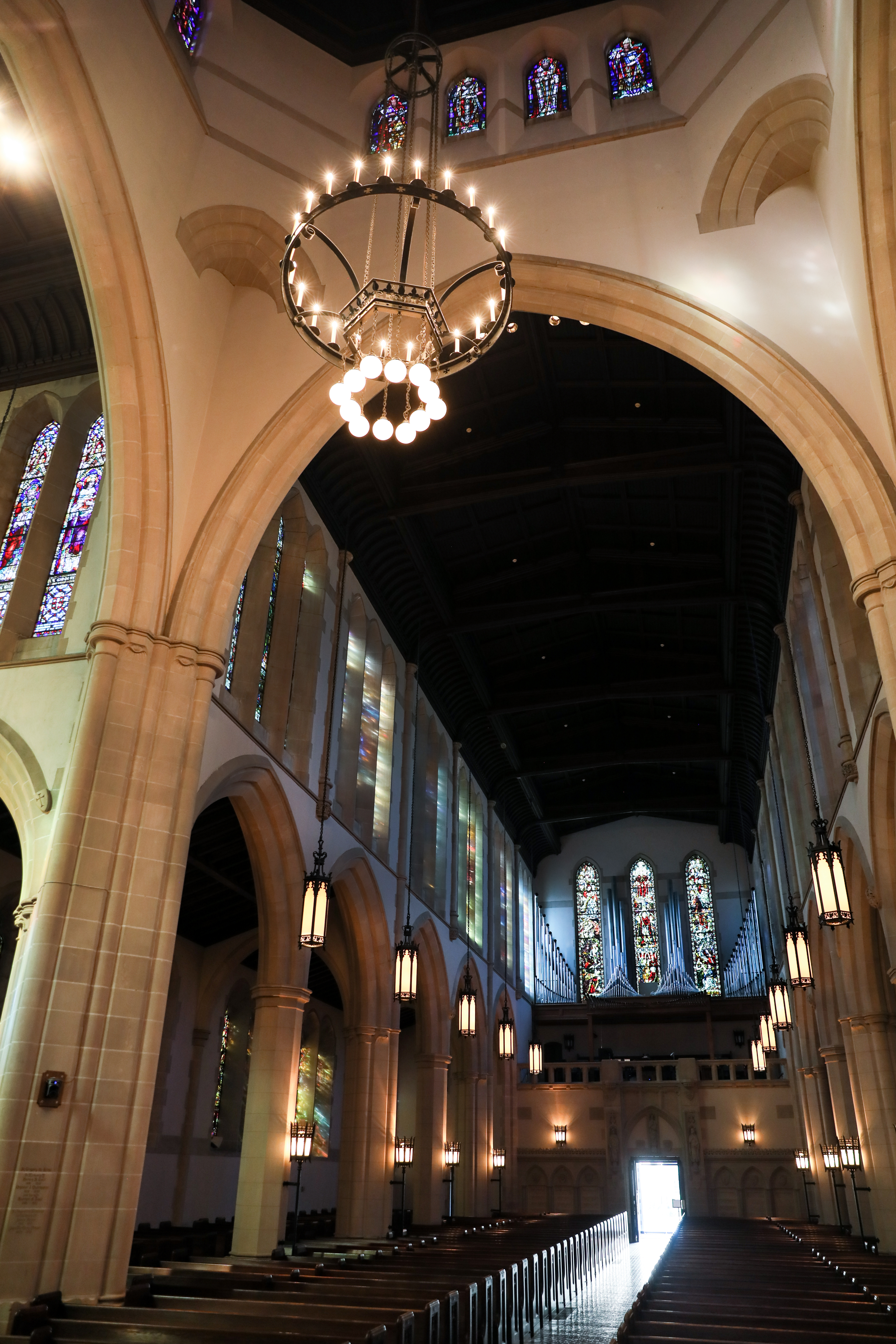
Calvary West View

At the turn of the twentieth century, East Liberty's demographics began to change and the challenges of neighborhood decline caused Calvary congregation to consider relocation. In December 1904, the Calvary Vestry met to consider the sale of the Penn Avenue church and the construction of a new, larger structure. The decision to move was not an easy one. Although traffic noise from Penn Avenue and the Pennsylvania Railroad made the second location less desirable, church members felt great affection for their second church building. In early 1905, parishioners agreed to sell the second church property and authorize the purchase of a property on the northeast corner of Shady Avenue and Walnut Street for the new church.

For its new building on Shady Avenue, Calvary selected Ralph Adams Cram as architect. The choice was perhaps a surprising one given Cram's championing of Gothic architecture, which favored "high church" tendencies, and Calvary congregation's preference of "low church" practices. In example, the "low church" characteristic is evidenced in that Morning Prayer was the most common form of Sunday worship, while the Eucharist was only celebrated once a month. Reconciling this difference, Cram promised his design would be "strong, chaste, and uplifting." He drew inspiration of Calvary Church from Netley and Tintern abbeys in England. His vision included elements of Arthurian mysticism as well as Anglo-Catholicism. The spire and arches, according to Cram, "point us upward," the cross "everywhere crowns the whole," and "the ornament everywhere visible on buttress and balustrade, on door and windows and wall, is the shield as a symbol of the power of faith."

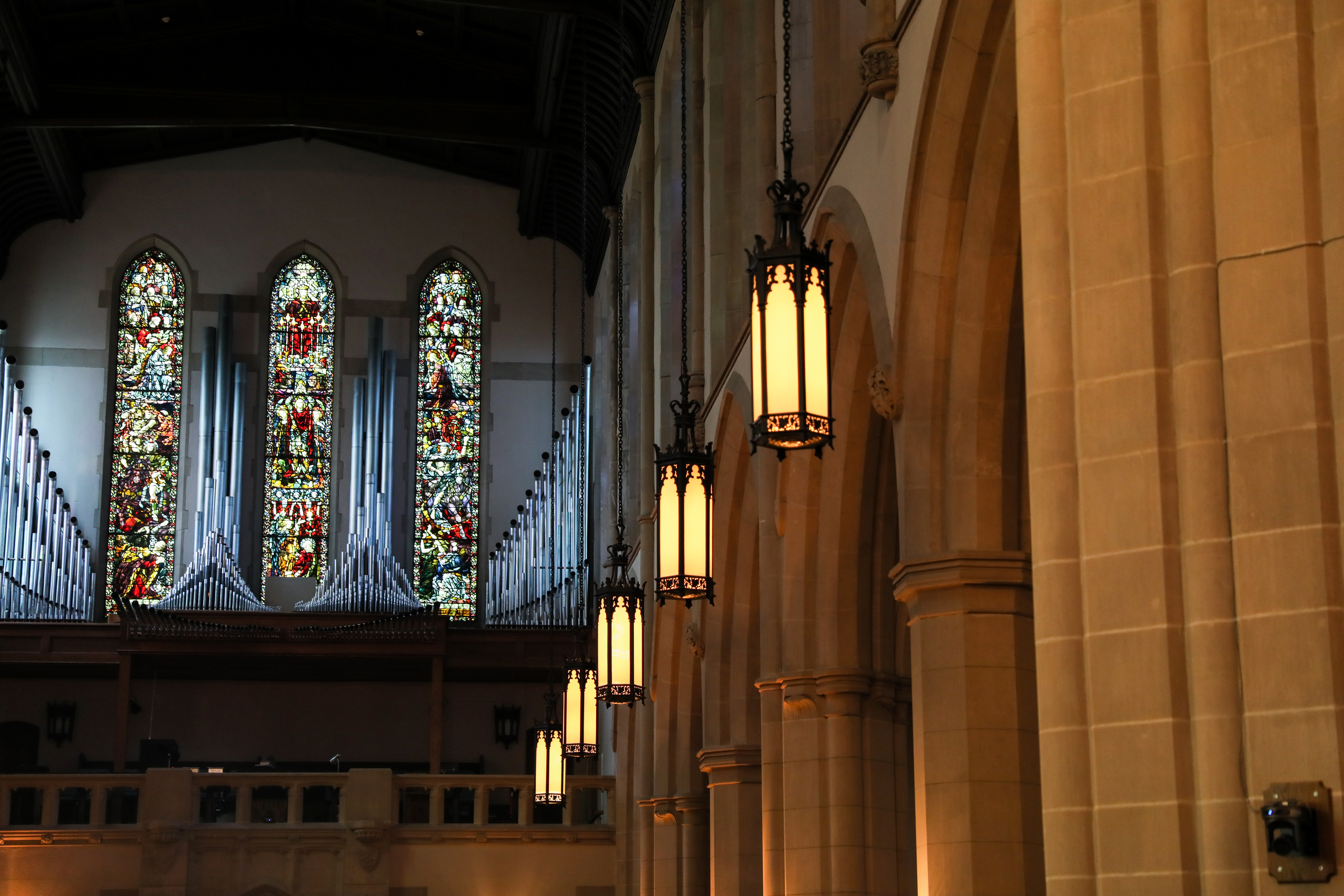
West End Organ Antiphonal Division, West Window, Heaton, Butler and Bayne, London, England

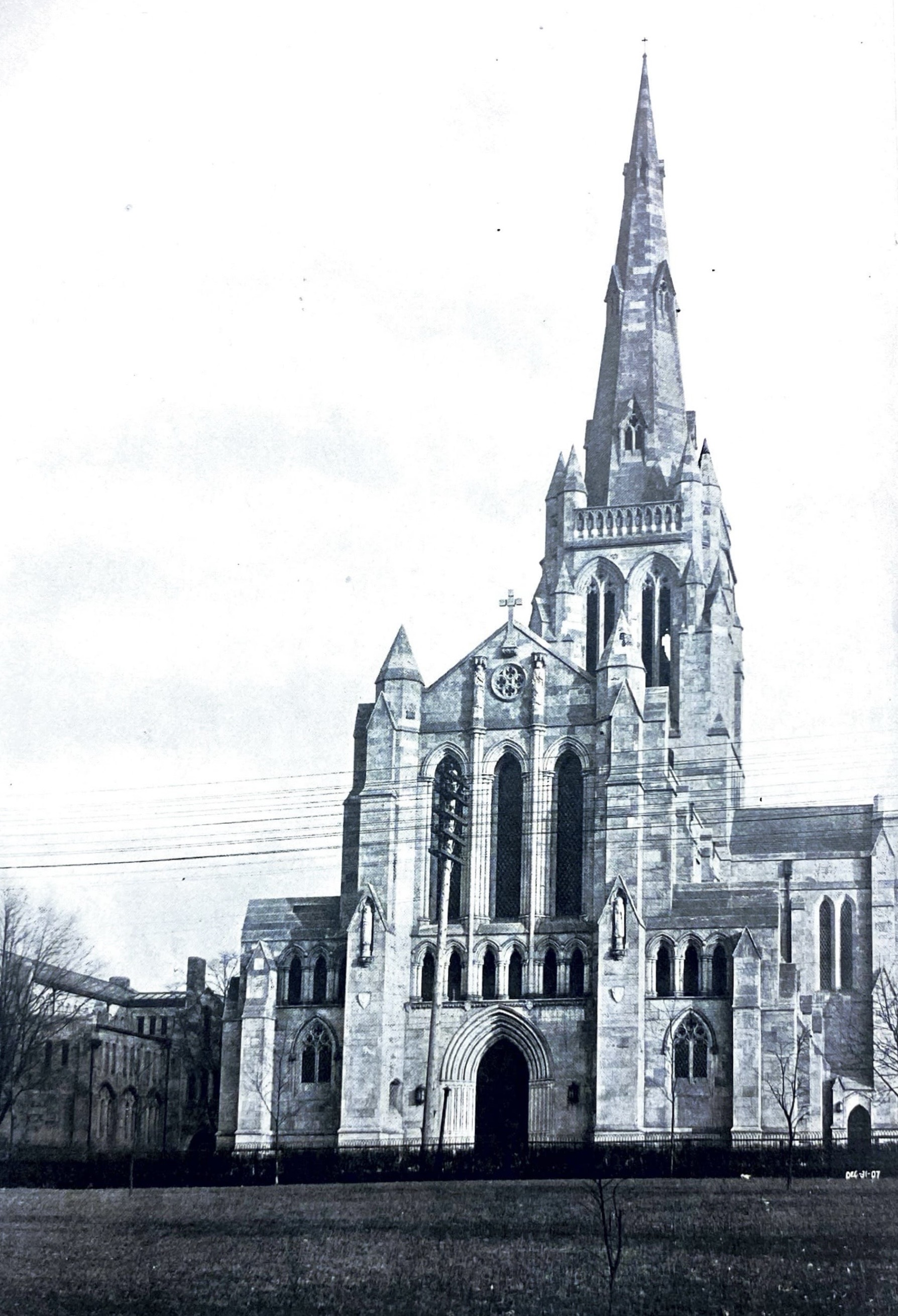
Calvary Episcopal Church, from across Shady Ave, December 31, 1907

On December 19, 1907, Calvary held its first service in the imposing Gothic structure on Shady Avenue, which, at that time, consisted only of the church connected to a three-story parish house. The total cost was $400,000, but within seven years Calvary was free of debt, due in part to the generous assistance of industrialist, Henry Clay Frick. Frick's daughter, Helen Clay Frick, donated 11 bells from the Meneely Bell Foundry in Troy, NY, which can still be heard ringing from Calvary's landmark tower. Despite Cram's grand Gothic architecture, Calvary parish continued worship for many years in a "low church" fashion. Eventually, however, the grandeur and size of the new building led to a greater use of pageantry, more formal vestments, and full processions with choir, clergy, and acolytes. These being attributes of "high church" ritual, the influence of Cram's architecture had effect on the congregation.

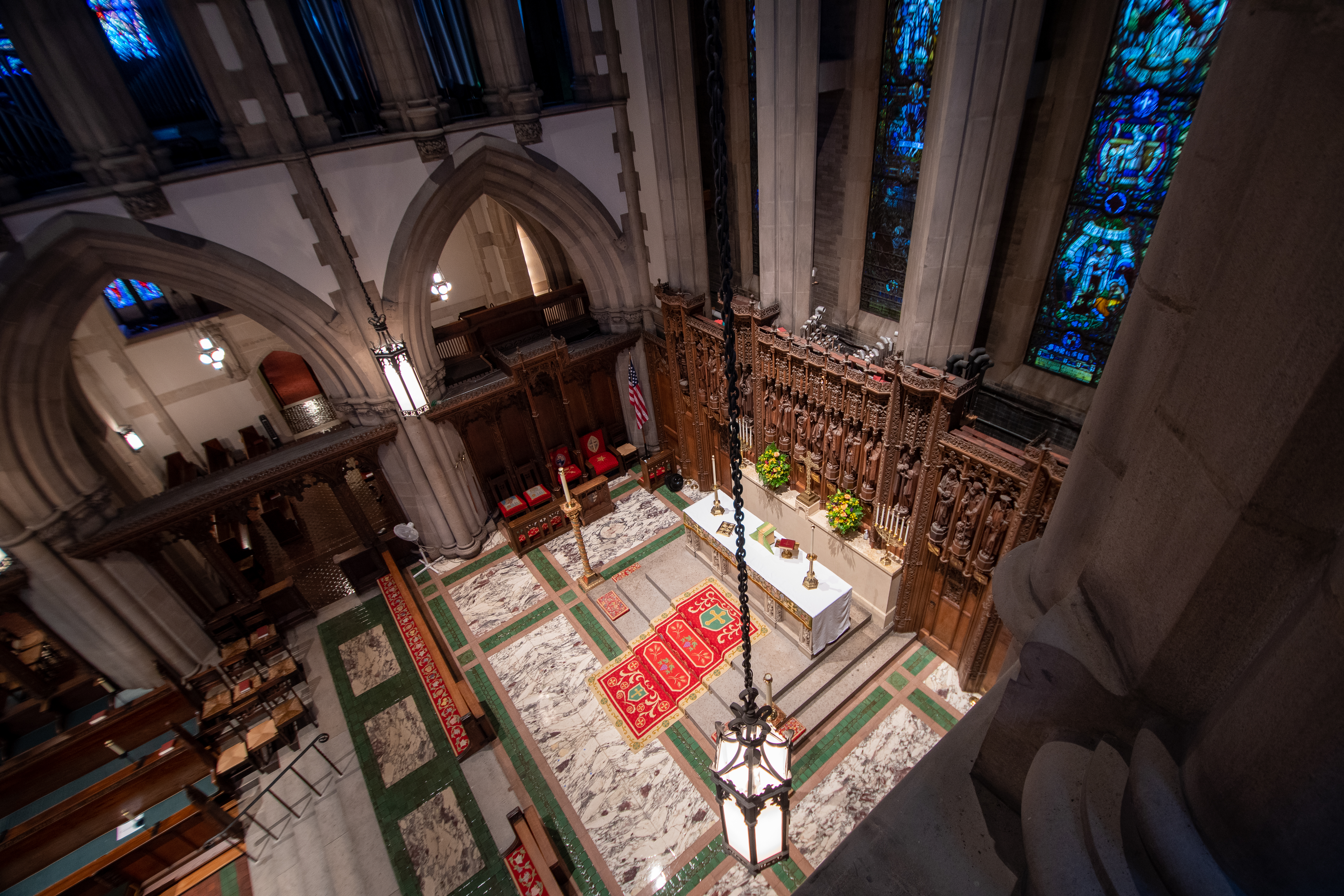
Aerial View of Calvary High Altar

From the congregation's beginning in 1855, Calvary relied on pew rentals to raise money for expenses. Under Calvary's by-laws, only members who rented pews were permitted to vote in annual parish meetings. By the 1940s, there was no longer availability of pews to rent, resulting in the disenfranchisement of some members. At its 1950 annual meeting, the vestry passed a resolution ending pew rentals. There is some documentation, though, that pledging and pew rentals occurred simultaneously during a period of transition.

Through the 1970s, Calvary followed a socially liberal course, while the Episcopal Diocese of Pittsburgh shifted toward conservatism. This greatly impacted Calvary's influence within the Pittsburgh Diocese and upon its ability to advocate in the national Episcopal Church. Calvary was at the forefront of the ordination of women in the Episcopal Church. In 1974, the Rev. Beryl Choi, one of the first ordained women in the Church's history, became the first woman to hold a continuing parish appointment as a priest in the Diocese of Pittsburgh. Since then, women have always been represented among the clergy at Calvary.

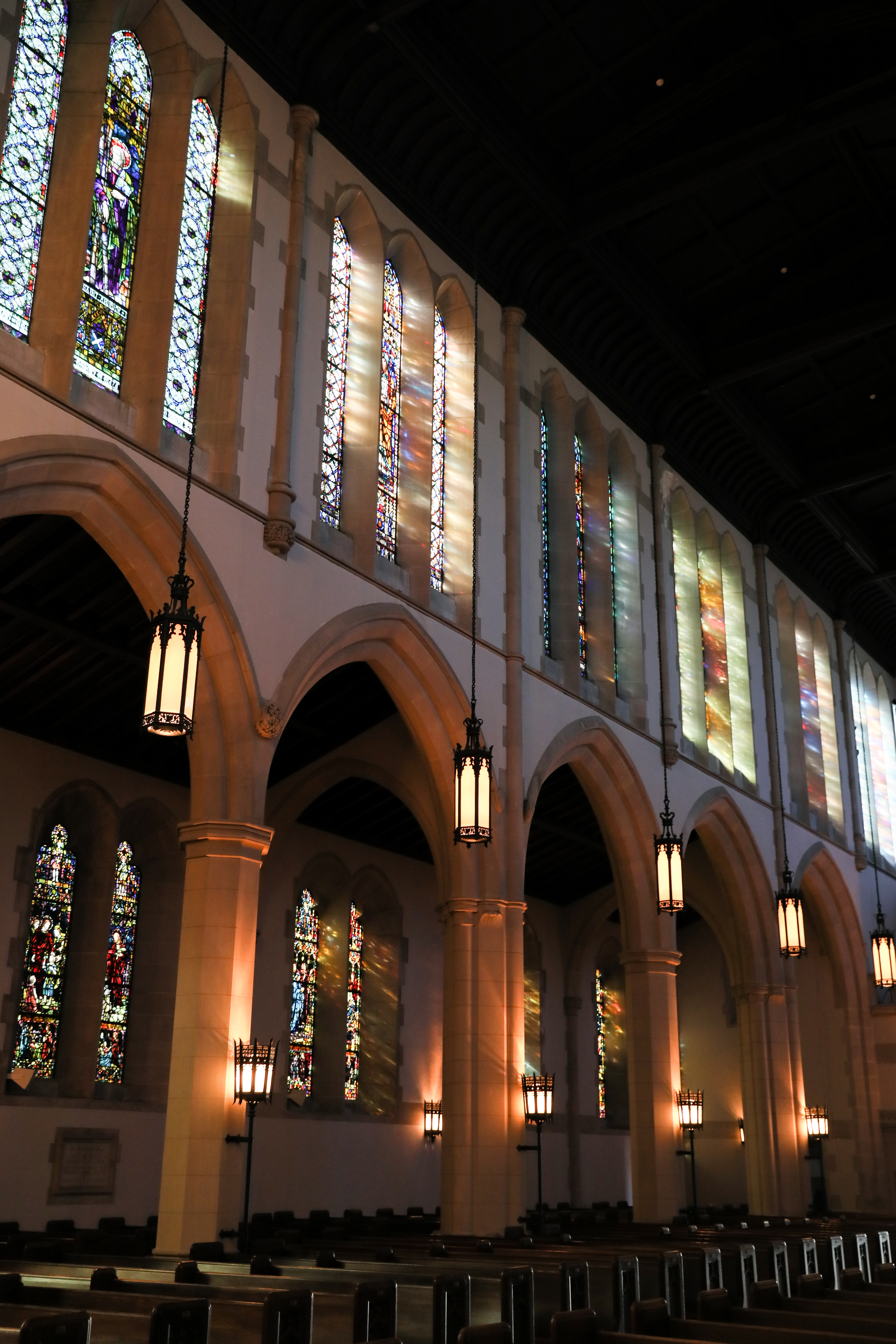
South Nave Windows

== Dimensions and seating capacity ==
- Extreme Length = 208 feet
- Extreme Width of Transepts = 108 feet
- Height of Nave = 55 feet
- Height of Lantern Tower = 75 feet
- Height of Tower = 119 feet
- Height of Spire = 101 feet
- Grade line to tip of Spire Cross = 220 feet
- Current Seating Capacity = 1,000 persons

== Cram on Calvary ==
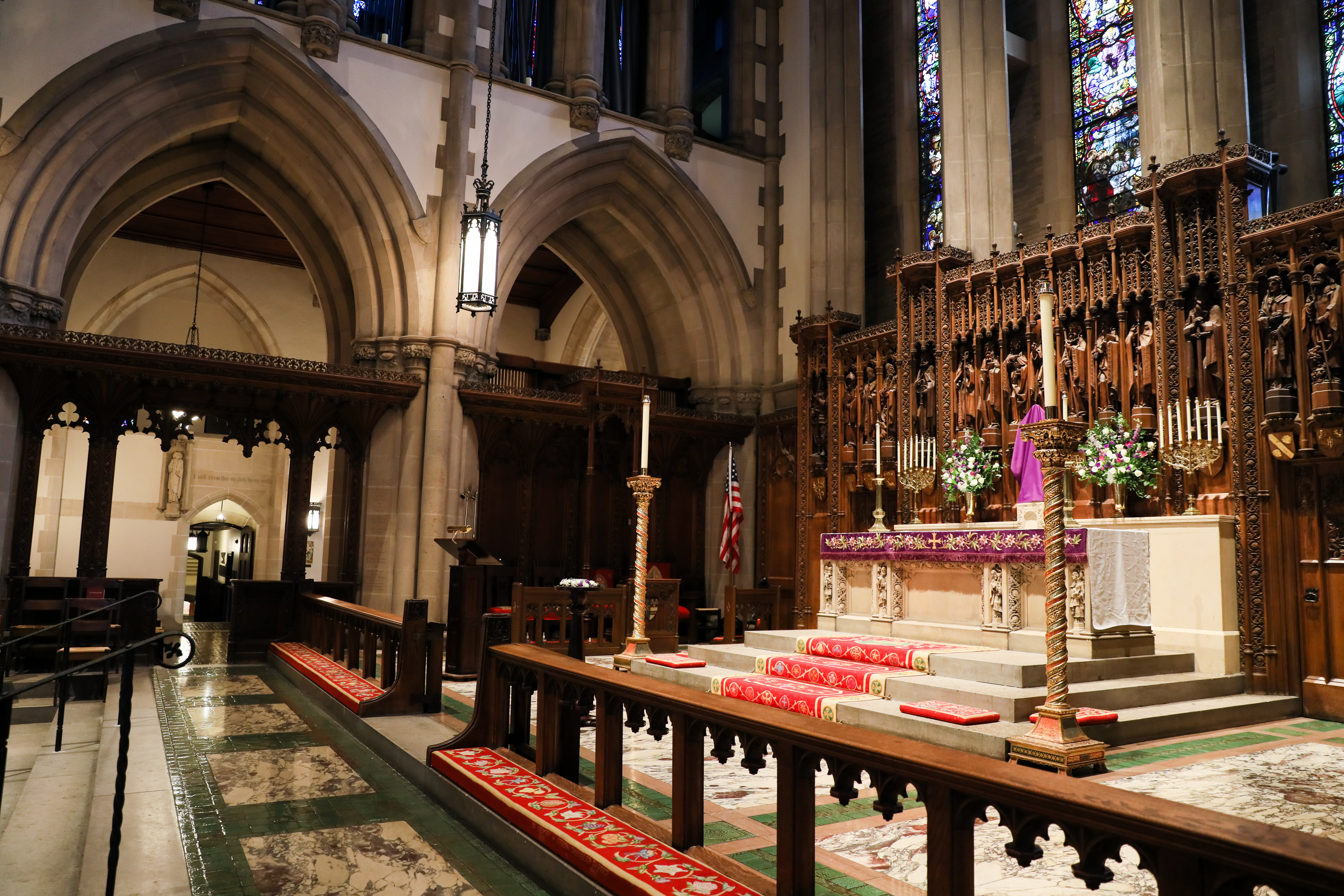
Calvary High Altar

Cram believed that "the foundation of good architecture and structural integrity" was made visible in his work at Calvary Church. When viewing the church's exterior, the concept of an organic whole is observed by a clear and layered geometry. Each part - the tower, transepts, lancets, buttress, and west facade - form a cohesive whole. The Indiana limestone exterior presents a refined austerity, assisting in the way the building's form points toward the heavens at ever-higher levels. The viewer's eye is eased upward by the repeating, slender, and triple lancets as well as the play of light and shadow across the church's surface. Cram justifiably took great pride in the tower and remarked on it in his memoirs: "The central tower I look upon with a certain satisfaction, since there appears a new solution of the old problem of the transition from the square of the basic tower to the polygon of the spire. The building's exterior forms give promise of what lies inside this great sacred vessel." In a 1907 letter he described it as, "The best thing we ever did or shall do."

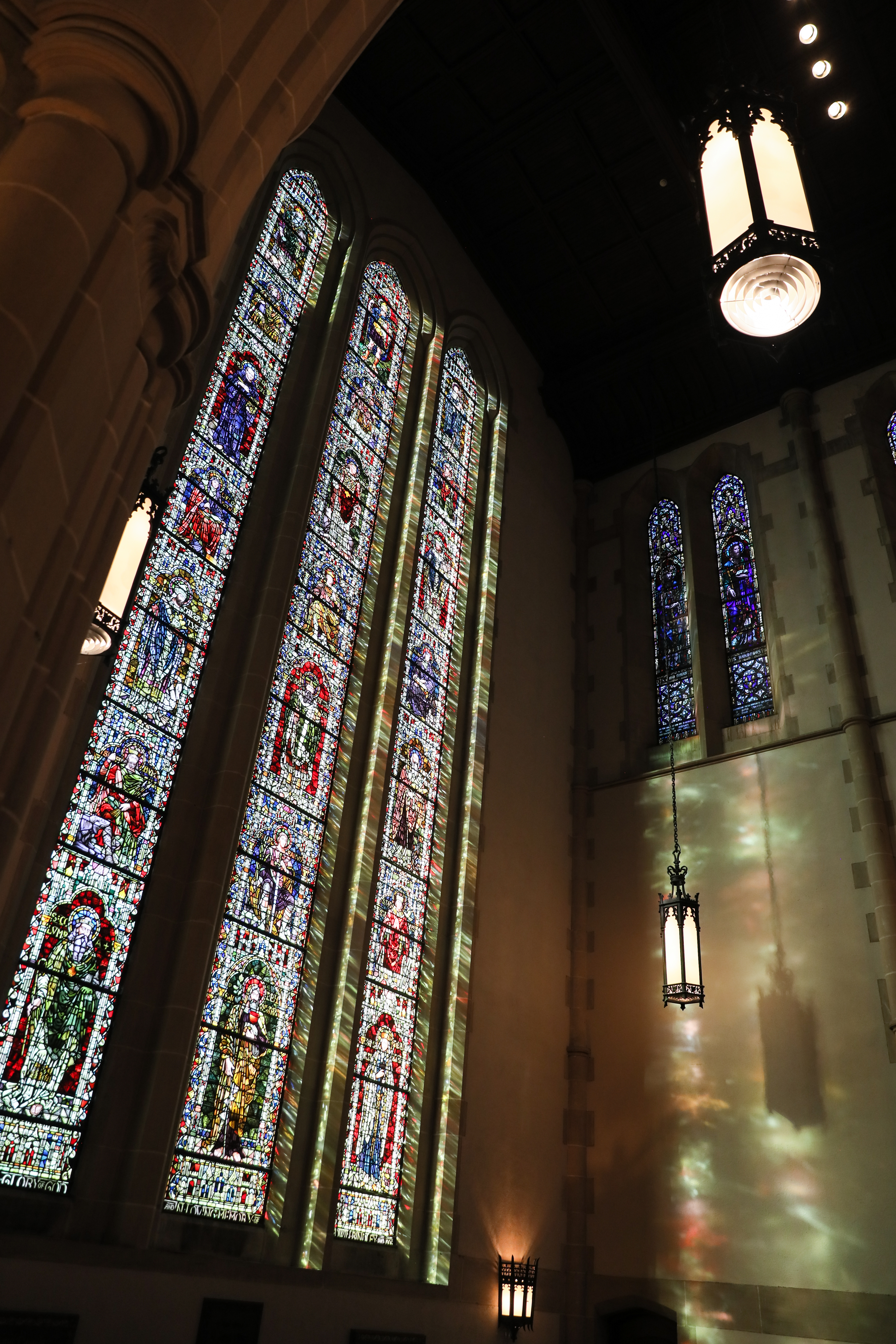
South Transept Window, "British Saints, Martyrs and Missionaries," Heaton, Butler and Bayne, London

== Stained glass ==
Cram greatly disliked the stained glass of his contemporaries, John LaFarge and Louis Comfort Tiffany, and wanted his churches to reflect earlier medieval aesthetics. Having difficulty finding craftsmen to recreate such techniques in the United States, Cram often turned to English artisans for stained glass. Heaton, Butler, and Bayne of London designed twenty-three windows in Calvary Church, including the large transept window of early English saints, martyrs, and missionaries. Cram eventually discovered two important American stained glass artists in Pittsburgh with whom he could work.

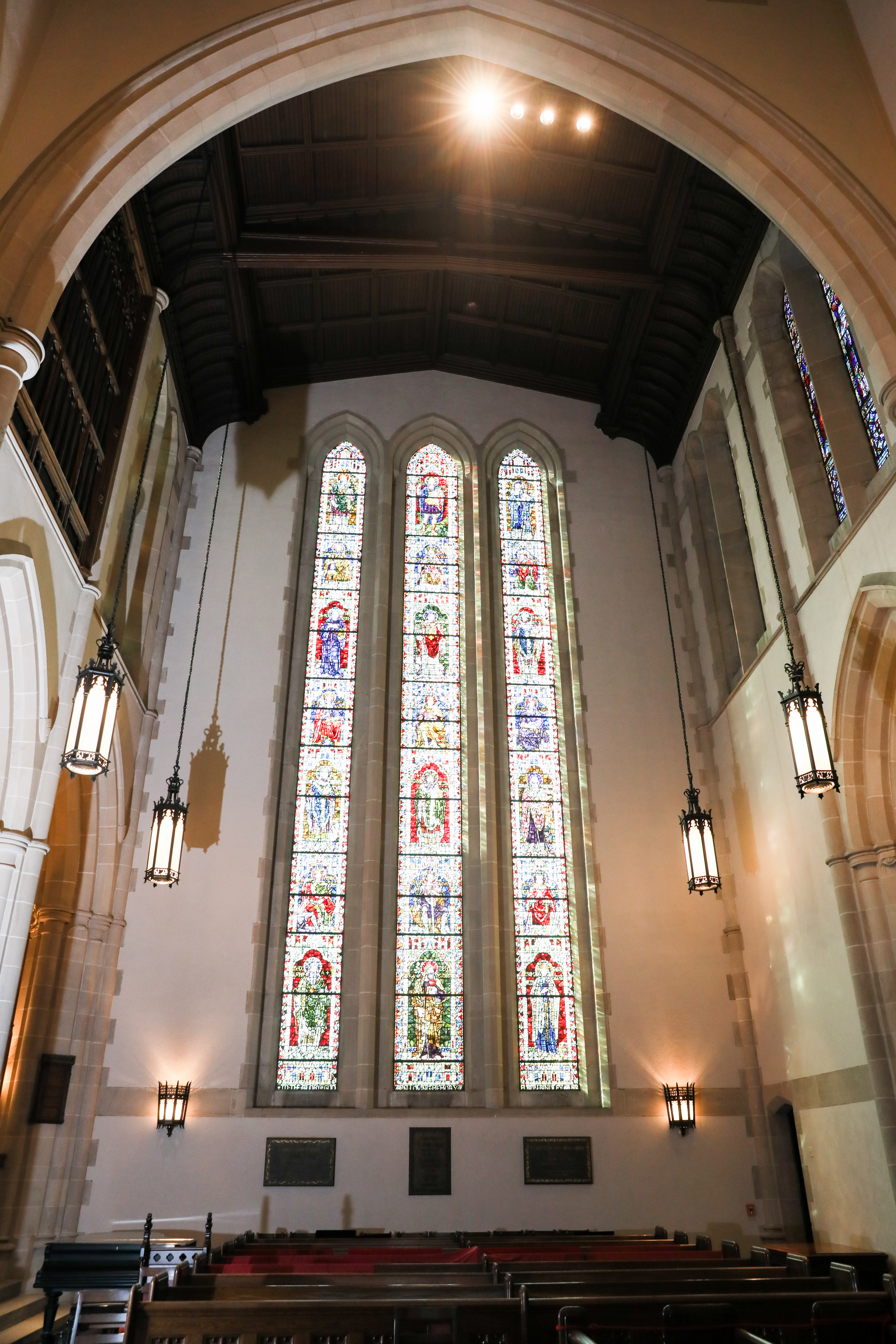
Calvary South Transept Window, "British Saints, Martyrs and Missionaries," Heaton, Butler and Bayne, London

Pittsburgh's great innovator in stained glass was William Willet (1869–1921), owner and co-founder of Willet Stained Glass Studios, is responsible for making the first medallion window in America, in 1903 in First Presbyterian Church downtown, two years before construction began at Calvary Church. This window was celebrated as the first antique medallion window produced in the country to emulate medieval standards. Cram saw the window, was impressed by it, and hired Willet Stained Glass Studios to work in Calvary Church. Willet designed the East (Passion) Window above Calvary's high altar, the Annunciation window in the Lady Chapel, and the third window in the nave's north aisle depicting The Greatest in the Kingdom.

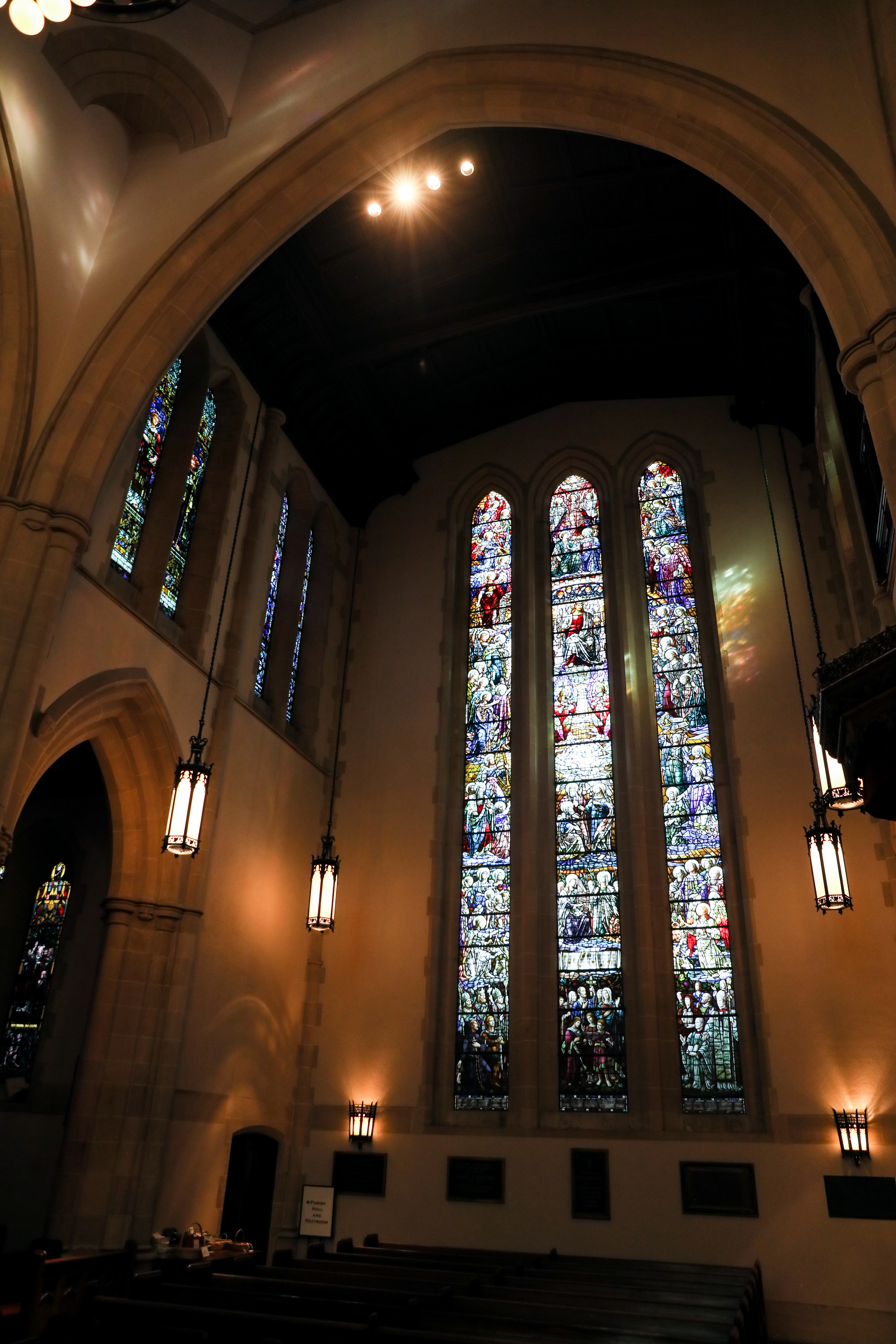
Calvary North Transept Window, "Te Deum," Gorham Company, New York

The second artisan in Pittsburgh significant to Calvary's stained glass was Charles J. Connick (1875–1945). Connick originally worked under Willet when he was the Director of Art at the Pittsburgh Stained Glass Company. He, having studied with Willet, was also a leader in the recreation of medieval stained glass techniques. Some of his best work is located in Pittsburgh, including Calvary Episcopal Church, where there are fourteen major windows plus sixteen lantern tower and twelve chancel clerestory windows by him in the church. Connick also designed several other windows located throughout the building.

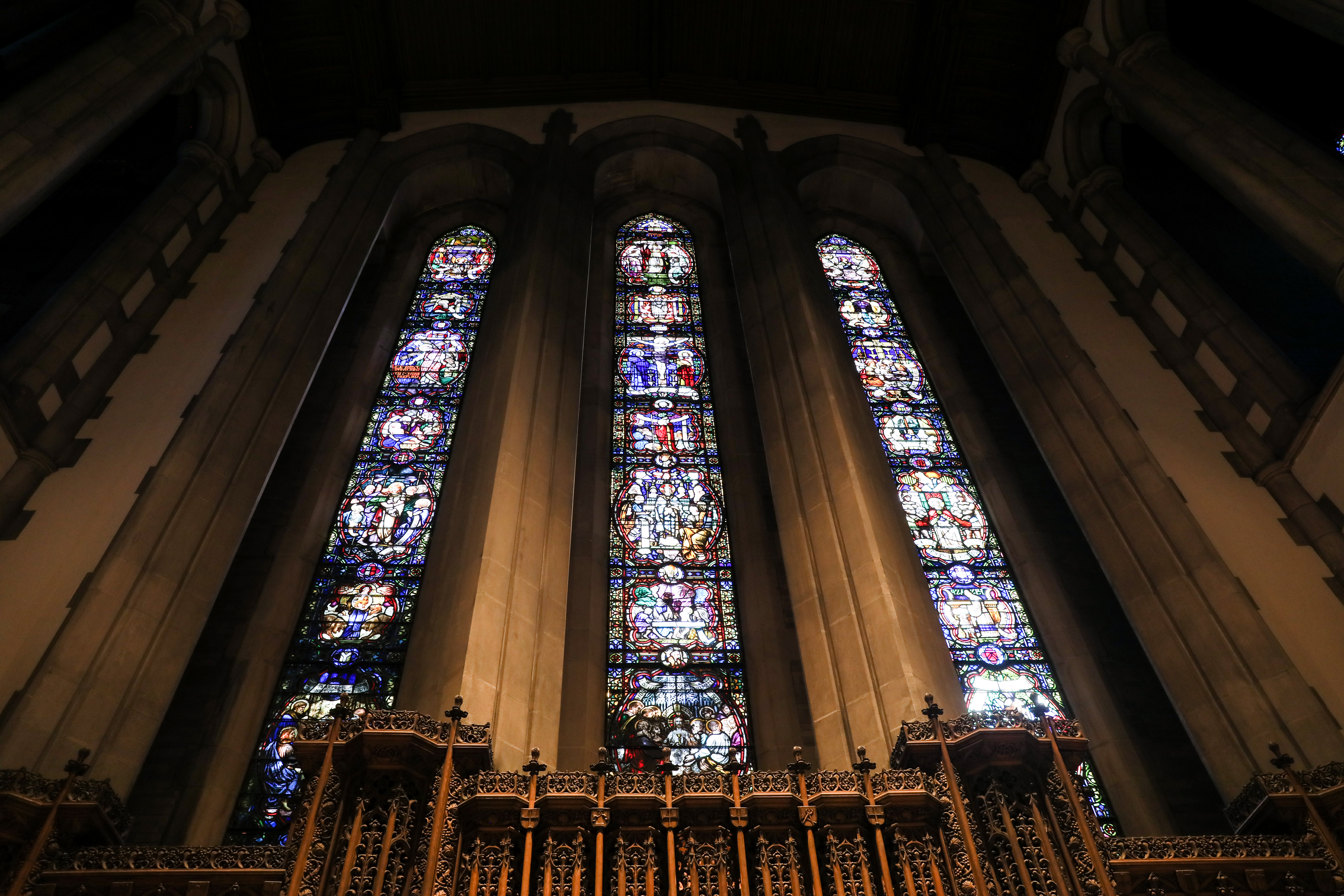
High Altar/Chancel Window, "The Passion Story," William Willet, Pittsburgh

Other stained glass windows in Calvary Episcopal Church include works by Cox & Sons of London, England; Harry E. Goodhue Company of Cambridge, Massachusetts; Gorham Company of New York, New York; and Reynolds, Francis & Rohnstock of Boston, Massachusetts.

=== Stained glass windows and subjects by firm with location and date ===
C.J. Connick, Boston, Mass

- St. Jude (South Nave Clerestory, 1925)
- St. Philip (South Nave Clerestory, 1923)
- St. Matthias (North Nave Clerestory, 1925)
- St. Simon (North Nave, 1924)
- St. Thomas (North Nave, 1924)
- St. John the Evangelist (North Nave Clerestory, 1923)
- St. Cornelius (North Transept Clerestory West, 1925)
- St. Silas (North Transept Clerestory West, 1925)
- St. Timothy (South Transept Clerestory West, 1923)
- St. Titus (South Transept Clerestory West, 1923)
- St. Barnabas (South Transept Clerestory West, 1923)
- St. John Mark (South Transept Clerestory, 1923)
- Christian Virtues (12) (Chancel Clerestory, 1934)
- Mary and Martha (Lady Chapel Gallery, 1939)
- Supper at Emmaus (Choir Ambulatory, 1936)
- St. Francis (Lantern Tower South, "Friendly Saints", 1922)
- St. Elizabeth (Lantern Tower South, "Friendly Saints", 1922)
- St. Agnes (Lantern Tower South, "Friendly Saints", 1922)
- St. Vincent de Paul (Lantern Tower South, "Friendly Saints", 1922)
- St. Jerome (Lantern Tower West, "Wise Saints", 1922)
- St. Ambrose (Lantern Tower West, "Wise Saints",1922)
- St. Augustine (Lantern Tower West, "Wise Saints", 1922)
- St. Gregory (Lantern Tower West, "Wise Saints", 1922)
- St. George (Lantern Tower North, "Militant Saints", 1922)
- St. Genevieve (Lantern Tower North, "Militant Saints", 1922)
- St. Joan of Arc (Lantern Tower North, "Militant Saints", 1922)
- St. Theodore (Lantern Tower North, "Militant Saints", 1922)
- St. Michael (Lantern Tower East, "Archangel Saints", 1922)
- St. Gabriel (Lantern Tower East, "Archangel Saints", 1922)
- St. Raphael (Lantern Tower East, "Archangel Saints", 1922)
- St. Uriel (Lantern Tower East, "Archangel Saints", 1922)
- Nativity (Ladies Room, 1929)
- Pennsylvania Circuit Rider (Narthex South, 1929)
- Moravian Trumpeters (Narthex South, 1929)
- Benjamin Franklin and Kite (Narthex North, 1929)
- Johnny Appleseed (Narthex North, 1929)
- George Washington and Queen Aliquippa (Narthex West, 1939)
- Chief Cornplanter (Narthex West, 1939)
- Peter Minuit (Narthex West, 1939)
- Washington and "Half-King" Tanacharison (Narthex West, 1939)
- Capt. Contrecoeur (Parish House Walkway, 1927)
- William Penn and Native Americans (Parish House Walkway, 1927)
- Washington and Braddock (Parish House Walkway, 1927)
- Daniel Boone and Braddock (Parish House Walkway, 1927)
- Perry at Lake Erie (Parish House Walkway, 1927)
- Lincoln at Gettysburg (Parish House Walkway, 1927)
- Francis Scott Key (Refectory, 1930)
- Stephen C. Foster (Refectory, 1930)
- Liberty Bell (Refectory, 1930)
- Regina Hartman (Refectory, 1930)

Cox & Sons, London, England

- Dorcas (Sacristy, 1907)

Harry E. Goodhue Company, Cambridge, Mass

- Great Commission (North Aisle, 1908)

Gorham Company, New York, NY

- Te Deum lauadamus (North Transept, 1911)

Heaton, Butler & Bayne, London, England

- Nativity (South Aisle, 1907)
- Adoration of the Magi (South Aisle, 1907)
- The Circumcision (South Aisle, 1907)
- Good Shepherd and Christ Blessing the Children (South Aisle, 1907)
- Sermon on the Mount (South Aisle, 1907)
- Woman of Samaria (North Aisle, 1914)
- Rich Young Ruler (North Aisle, 1914)
- Ministry of Women (North Aisle, 1913)
- Church Triumphant (West Window, 1910)
- St. Matthew (South Nave Clerestory, 1924)
- St. Andrew (South Nave Clerestory, 1917)
- St. Bartholomew (North Nave Clerestory, 1923)
- St. Peter (North Nave Clerestory, 1923)
- Isaiah (North Transept Clerestory East, 1914)
- Jeremiah (North Transept Clerestory East, 1914)
- St. Stephen (North Transept Clerestory West, 1923)
- St. Luke (North Transept Clerestory West, 1923)
- Daniel (South Transept Clerestory East, 1917)
- Ezekiel (South Transept Clerestory East, 1917)
- Early English Saints (South Transept, 1907)
- St. Paul at Athens (All Saints' Chapel, 1925)
- St. Hugh and St. Victoria (All Saints' South Wall, 1918)
- Visitation/Annunciation (Baptistry, 1910)

Reynolds, Francis & Rohnstock, Boston, Mass

- St. James Major (South Nave Clerestory, 1924)
- St. James Minor (South Nave Clerestory, 1924)

Willet Stained Glass Company, Pittsburgh, Penna

- East (Passion) Window (High Altar, 1907)
- Annunciation (Lady Chapel, 1907)
- Greatest in the Kingdom (North Aisle, 1908)

== Woodwork ==
One of the craftsmen who joined Cram in founding the Society of Arts and Crafts was John Kirchmayer (1860–1930). Kirchmayer's woodcarving is seen throughout Calvary's interior. The woodcarving was overseen by Irving and Casson, for whom Kirchmayer worked. Kirchmayer, born in Obergammergau, Bavaria, was the first woodcarver Cram met in America who knew how to create the medieval style carvings he needed for his churches. Cram's design for the woodwork at Calvary was inspired from 15th century examples in Devonshire and Essex, England.

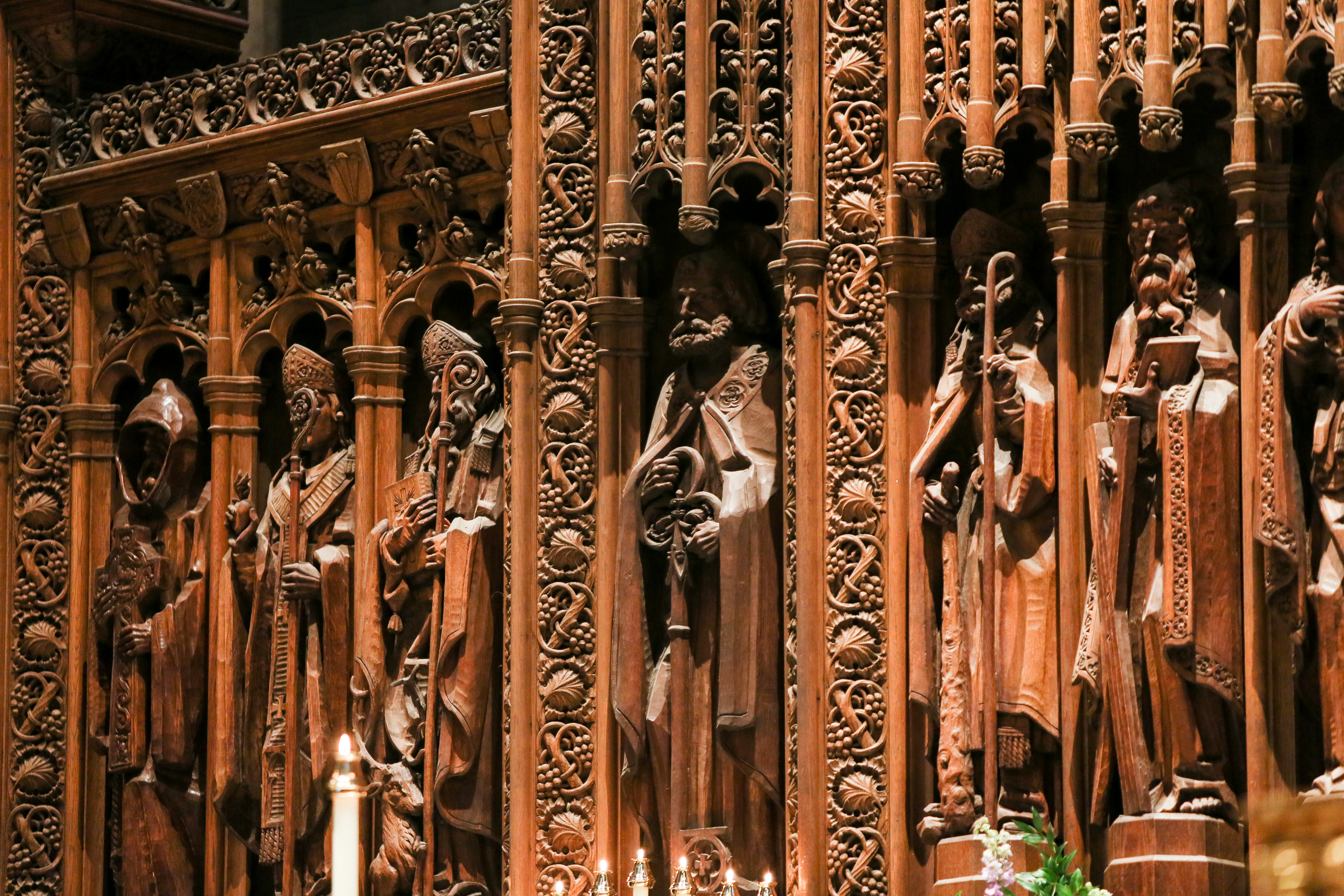
High Altar Reredos

=== Woodwork subjects ===
- Rood Screen, "Vine and Branches", designed by Ralph Adams Cram, encasing the chancel to represent the separation of Heaven and Earth
- Rood Screen Cross, "Reigning Christ" with onlooking St. Mary and St. John, designed by Ralph Adams Cram (Originally, the cross was mounted without any statuary and in the reverse position, with the current east-facing design, Lamb of God and Four Gospels, facing west. As the story goes, Cram envisioned a large crucifix, but the vestry and wardens, being of low and Protestant ilk, would have none of it. How could they explain to their Presbyterian friends a symbol in their church of Romish idolatry? Under Rev. van Etten, Rector VIII, the cross was turned, the "Reigning Christ" - a compromise design between having a crucifix and none at all - was commissioned of Cram, and the carvings of Sts. Mary and John returned from St. Barnabas Free Home.)
- Rood Screen Coats of Arms, "Sees of the Church of England, Ireland, and Wales": Glouster-Bristol, Lincoln, London, Winchester, Armagh of Ireland, York, Carlisle, Wells, Durham, and St. Davids.
- Pulpit Figures; Lower: Jeremiah, Zachariah, Hosea, Ezekiel, and Habakkuk. Upper: St. John Chrysostom, St. Francis of Assisi, St. Bernard of Clairvaux, Bishop Anselm Archbishop of Canterbury, and St. Athanasius, Savonarola.
- Pulpit Coats of Arms, "Dioceses in Pennsylvania": Erie, Pennsylvania, Pittsburgh, Harrisburg. An adaptation of the United States Seal is on the left.
- Lectern, "Rotating" with racks on each side for Old and New Testaments, depicts "I saw an angel having the everlasting Gospel" (Rev. 14:6).
- Reredos of the High Altar Figures, Left-to-Right: St. Michael (Guardian Angel), Sts. Columba, Augustine, Aiden (Missionaries), St. Peter, St. James (Bishop), St. Andrew (Missionary), St. John, Christ (Center), St. James, St. Philip (Missionary), St. Timothy (Bishop) St. Paul, Sts. Stephen, Ignatius, Alban (Martyrs), St. Gabriel (Guardian Angel).
- Choir Stall Figures: Angel with viol, Angel with lute, Angel with trumpet, Angel with portatif, King David writing Psalms, Zechariah with calipers, St. Simeon (author of the Nunc Dimittis), St. Mary (author of the Magnificat), St. Bernard of Cluny with cowl and tonsure, St. Bernard of Clairvaux with mitre and Prayer Book, St. Andrew with miter and whip, St. Theodulph (author of Gloria, Laus et Honor), Thomas Tallis (Father of English Church Music), John Marbecke (lay clerk and organist at St. George's Windsor), Henry Purcell (organist of Westminster Abbey and composer), and George Frederick Handel (composer).
- All Saints Chapel Reredos Figures, designed by Ralph Adams Cram, Left-to-Right: St. Mary, St. Anne, St. Michael, St. John, St. Francis of Assisi, and St. George and the Dragon.
- All Saints Chapel Communion Rail, designed by Ralph Adams Cram, "Vine and Fruit"
- Lady Chapel communion rail and credence table are from the second church on Penn Ave.
- Baptismal Font Cover Six Carvings, designed by Ralph Adams Cram: Visit of Mary to St. Elizabeth; The naming of St. John; Jesus and St. John the Baptist; The preaching of St. John the Baptist; The baptism of Jesus; and The beheading of St. John the Baptist. Inscription: But as many as received Him, to them gave He power to become the sons of God. (John 1:12)

== Chancel tile and marble ==
The tile and marble floor pattern of the chancel represents heaven by use of a cross within a square and is similar to a floor design at St. Chad's Church Burton-on-Trent, England. The cross materials are Knoxville white marble, the borders are of green tiles, the background is of reddish-brown tiles made by Addison Brayton Le Boutillier for the Grueby Faience Company of Boston. The corner tiles depict the symbols of the four evangelists, and the background and border tiles represent the garden of paradise.

=== Stonework subjects and locations ===
- St. Andrew, exterior north entrance to Narthex
- Sts. Matthew, Mark, Luke & John, exterior west facade
- Sts. Timothy, Stephen & Barnabas, exterior south entrance to Narthex
- Sts. Peter & Paul, interior Narthex
- Moses, Isaiah, & David, within the Nave on the Narthex wall
- Symbols of the Christian and Jewish religions: Chi Rho; Trinity; Dove of the Holy Spirit; Star; Crown; Alpha; Yahweh (Hebrew word for God); Omega; Seven-branched candlesticks (symbol for Old Testament worship, known as the Menorah); all within the Nave on the Narthex wall
- Rectors of Calvary Church (names incised in stone), within the Nave on the Narthex wall
- St. John the Baptist, All Saints' Chapel
- Sts. Michael & Gabriel, All Saints' Chapel
- Sts. Matthew, Mark, Luke & John, Chancel High Altar
- Vine, Lady Chapel Altar
- Sts. Matthew (depicted as a winged man), Mark (depicted as a winged lion), Luke (depicted as a winged ox) & (depicted as an eagle) John, Baptismal Font Base
- St. James, north wall entrance from Lady Chapel to Parish House
- World War II Memorial (493 names who served & 26 who gave their lives), Baptistry wall, 1949

== 1991–1993 restorations ==
The 1991–1993 restoration included plaster repairs, cleaning of stone, and addition of handicapped access ramps. The pendant lights were moved to the center of the bays to provide more uniform light, and a new wood floor was installed to replace the former wood floor under the pews to improve the acoustic performance of the space. A crossing platform was added to extend the level of the chancel towards the nave and to provide a place for a temporary altar closer to the congregation for medium-sized services (the transept pews were turned to face the new platform at this time); the new platform also provided safer passage to the lectern. New floor tile for the platform was carefully made by hand in North Carolina so as to match the original and allow for repairs to the original floor where needed. The crossing chandelier, having been taken down and deconstructed (the large ring had been used in the Narthex), was restored and reconstructed from pieces found in the basement. The All Saints' Chapel altar rail, installed in 1924, was removed and relocated to the baptistery (the chapel had been renamed "All Saints' Chapel" from "St. Andrew's Chapel" around 1940). The new parclose screen in the All Saints' Chapel was made by Herbert Read Ltd. of Tiverton, Devon, England. In the Lady Chapel, two reconstructions of the original electric lamps designed by Cram's partner Bertram Goodhue were hung in the space. A wood screen was added to define the space of the All Saints' Chapel, and an original lighting fixture was installed.

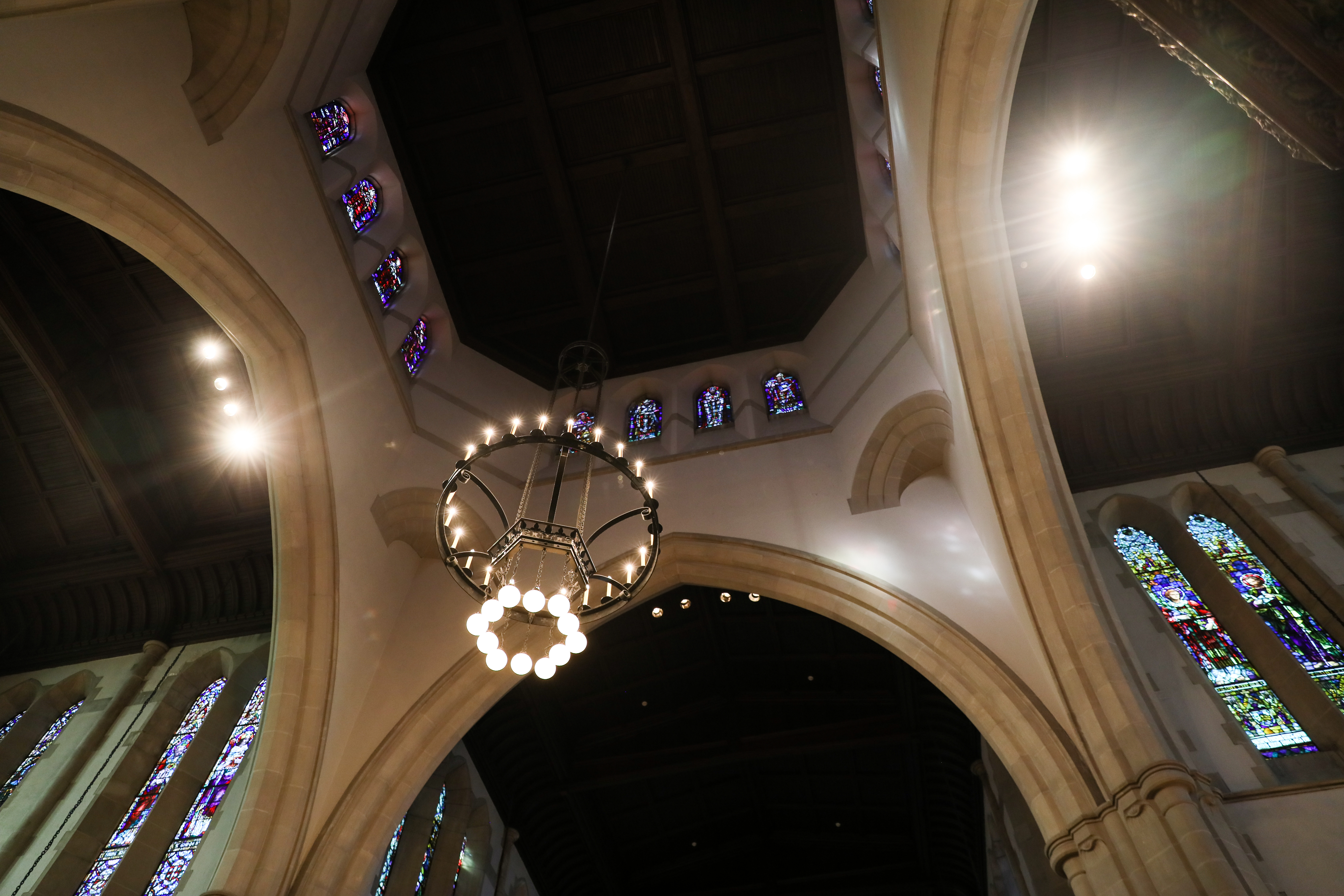
Calvary Crossing Lantern Chandelier

All of these minor interior modifications have left Cram's original design essentially intact. They have enhanced the use of the space for its use as a house of worship today.

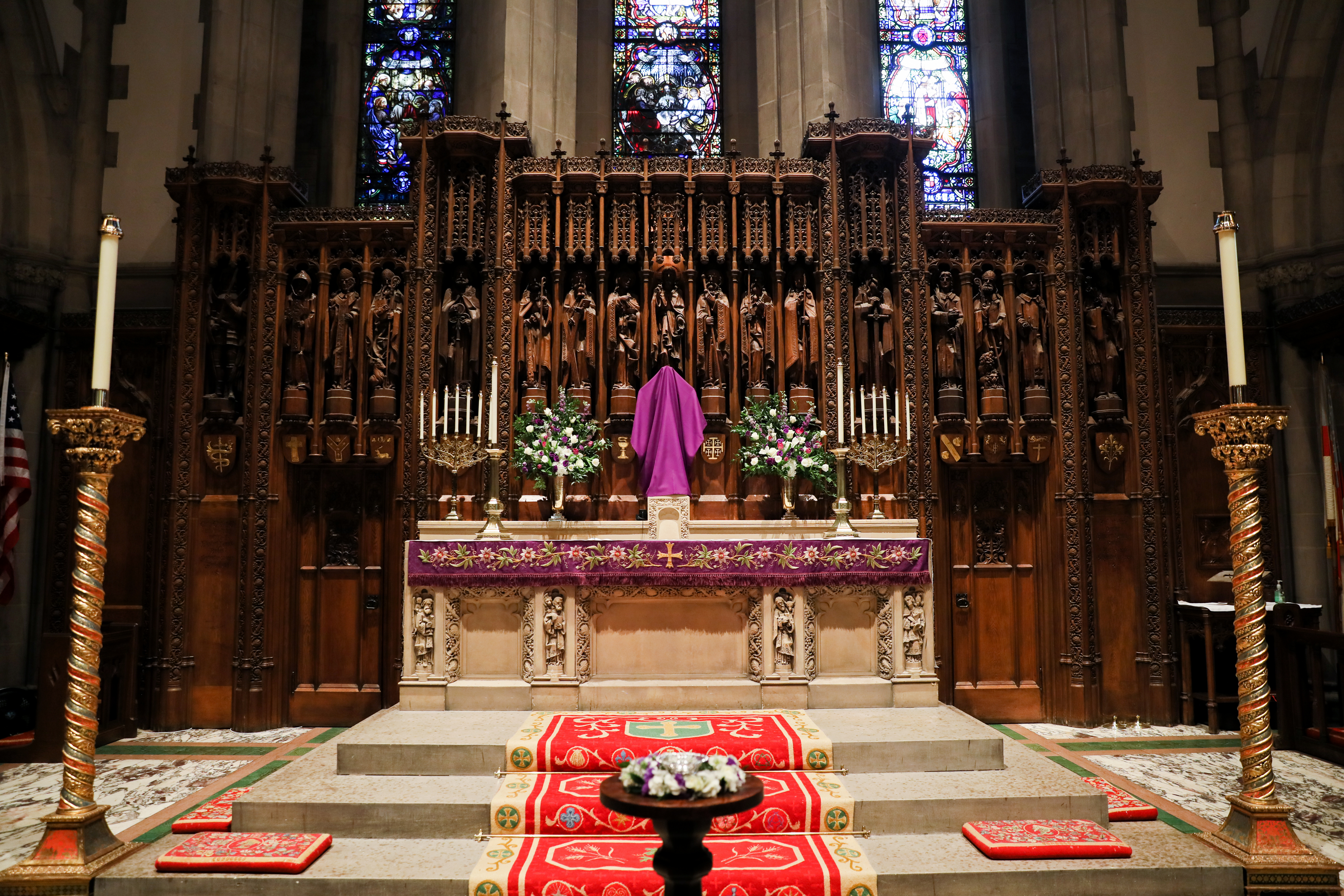
High Altar in Lent

== Other renovations ==
The parish house wing has had several renovations. The major spaces and their original architectural appointments, however, have survived intact, although some of these spaces were renamed and reassigned to different uses. The 1975 addition created the large multi-purpose parish hall, which although carefully integrated to existing hallways, has a more contemporary feeling. The 2004 interior renovation undid 1951 alterations, simplified circulation, added elevators and other accessibility improvements. Work was carefully designed and executed to match original details and finishes.

== Parish House as a military hospital ==
The Parish House wing was used as a U.S. military hospital during the influenza epidemic of 1918. In 1918, Cram designed the Celtic Cross World War I Memorial; it was made by the New England Granite Company of Westerly, Rhode Island. In the yard north of the church is a gabled stone site sign which was designed by Cram and installed in 1918.

== First radio broadcast of a church service ==
Calvary has held an important place in history of radio broadcasting. On January 2, 1921, the first ever radio broadcast of a church service was conducted from Calvary Episcopal Church by the International Radio Company on KDKA Westinghouse with the Westinghouse Electric Corporation. A bronze tablet commemorating the event was installed in 1923. The live radio broadcasts continued for nineteen years.

== Second World War Memorial ==
In 1949, a Second World War Memorial was dedicated in the church with the names of 493 men and women veterans of the parish carved into the north wall. The memorial was designed by Pittsburgh architects Schwab, Ingham, and Davis. The baptismal font Cram designed was moved from south of the chancel to north of the chancel at the War Memorial wall.

== Alcoholics Anonymous ==
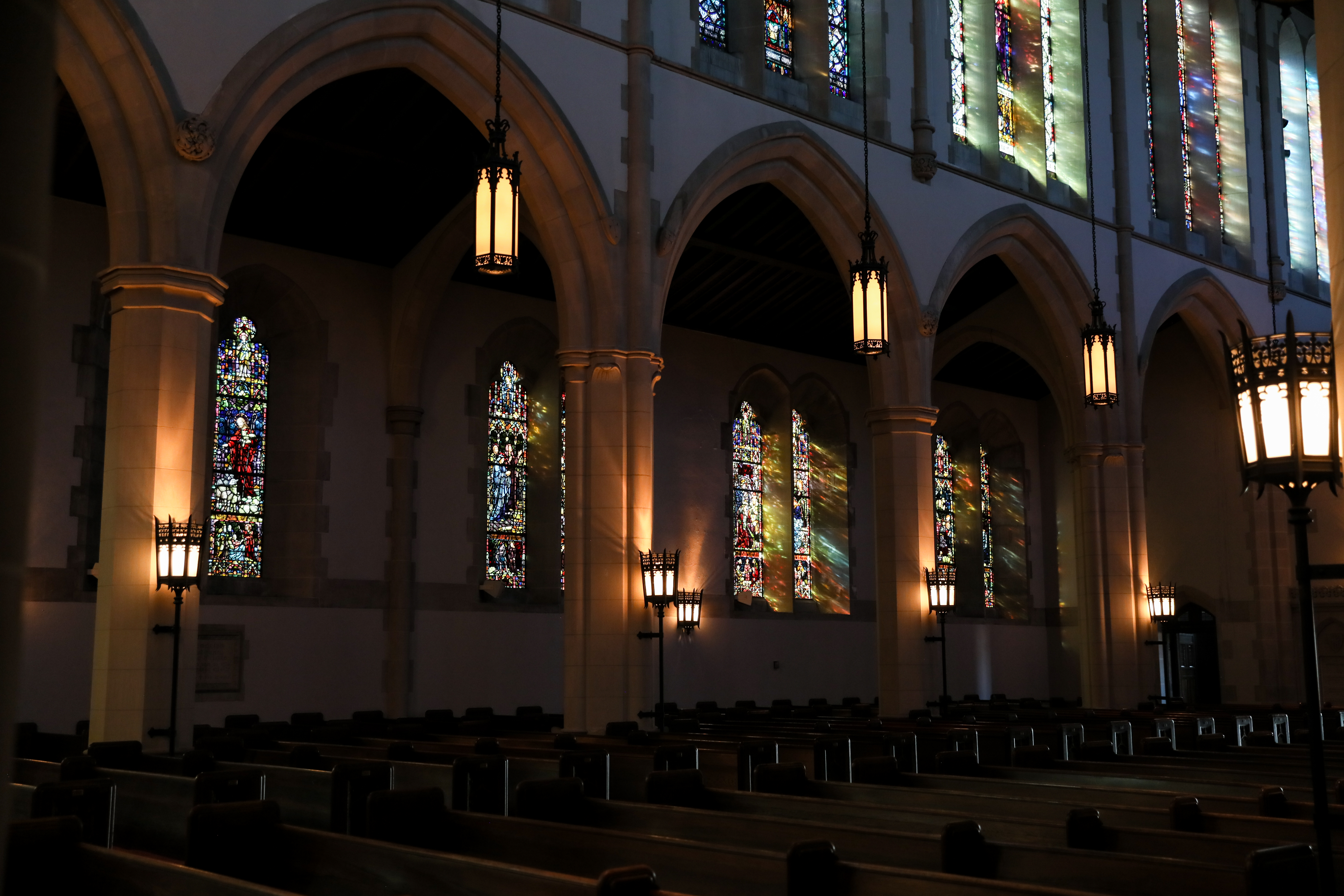
South Nave

In 1951, the Rev. Sam Shoemaker, who already had a nationwide radio show, accepted a call as the church's 12th rector. Shoemaker, who helped to found Alcoholics Anonymous and had long served as rector of Calvary Church in New York City, soon launched what he called the "Pittsburgh Experiment", seeking to bring Christian values into the workplace and everyday life. Although Shoemaker died in 1963 and the church recently installed its 16th rector, Shoemaker's legacy lives on in the Next Step Group which meets Tuesdays and Saturdays at the church.

== Columbarium ==
In 1973–74, a columbarium was installed in the ambulatory between the Lady Chapel and the chancel. It contains 250 niches for 850 urns. It was designed by Pittsburgh architect Lawrence Wolfe, bronze work made by the J.H. Matthews Company of Pittsburgh, wood work made by John Winterich and Company, Cleveland, Ohio.

== Instruments ==
The current building's first organ, a gift of Mr. John B. Jackson and Miss Jackson, was built by the M.P. Moller Company of Hagerstown, Maryland and used between 1907 and 1963. The instrument had four divisions and electric-pneumatic action. The instrument was described in 1908 as "fully adequate to the great size of the building, filling it to the utmost when desired, and yet the softest tones are heard in the most remote parts of the church." This organ console sat on a platform near the High Altar.

The second and current organ in Calvary Church is by Casavant Frères Limitée, Opus 2729, 1963. The case of the Casavant organ was carved by Andrew Druscelli of Irving and Casson A.H. Davenport Company of Cambridge, Massachusetts. As part of the 1991–1993 restorations, a new organ console was constructed to accommodate the enlargement and enhancement of the instrument. It was moved from being closer to the altar to its present location behind the lectern, facing the center of the chancel to allow the organist to face the choir.

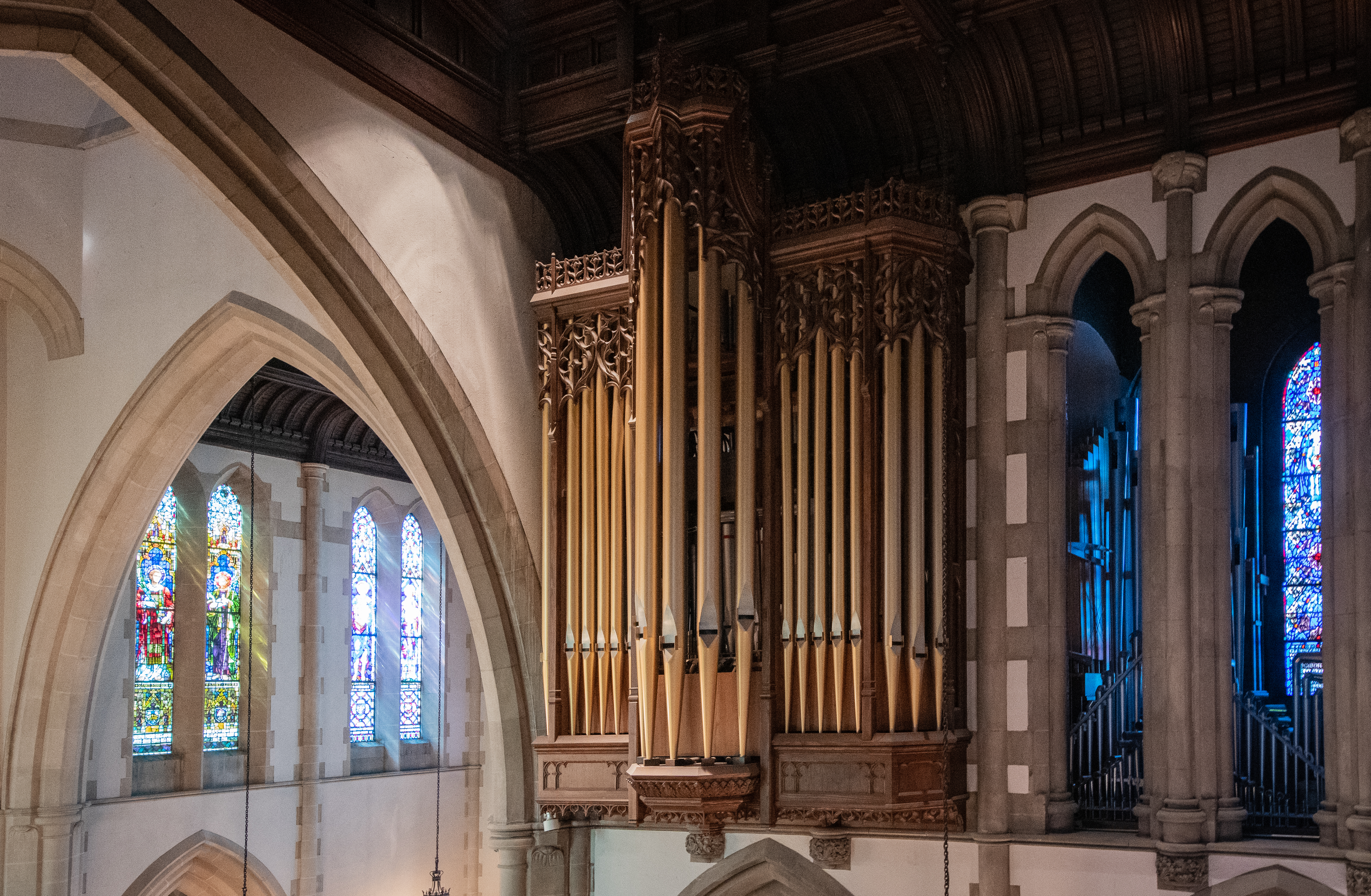
North Casavant Organ Case

Over the past several years, Calvary Episcopal Church has contracted with Luley & Associates to make revisions and repairs to its 1963/1991 Casavant Freres organ (IV/138). These revisions include: the replacement of the Recit chorus reeds; the addition of several new ranks of flue pipes; recomposition and revoicing of several Mixtures; the addition of the 8' Tuba Mirabilis on the Grand Orgue; the replacement of the Antiphonal 8' Trompette en Chamade; revoicing of select existing flue pipework; replacement of the Solid State control system; replacement and expansion of the console coupler rail and controls; new face plates for pistons and stop knobs. A new Pedal 32' Ophicleide unit speaks at 32', 16', and 8' pitches.

Other instrumental resources include a continuo organ (Taylor & Boody Op. 59, 2007), Bechstein grand piano, ca. 1890, an Italian-style harpsichord (Dupree, 1984), a pair of Ludwig timpani, a set of Dutch-style handbells, and eleven cast-bronze Meneely bells housed in the tower.

== Patron saint ==
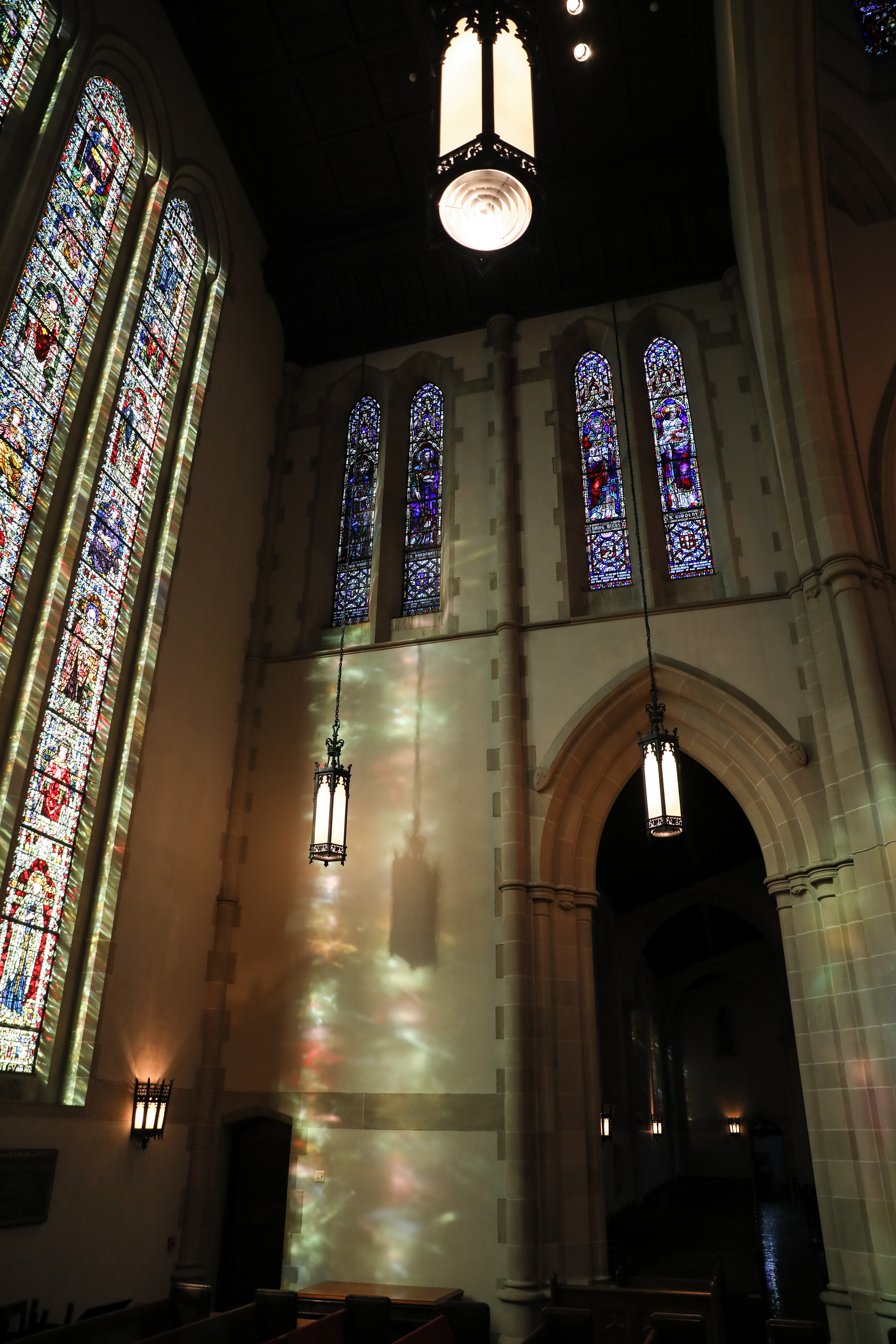
Stained Glass Reflection in the South Transept, West Wall Lancets: "St. Timothy," "St. Titus," "St. Barnabus," "St. John Mark," C.J. Connick Company, Boston

According to Calvary Archives, the Rev. Edwin van Etten, eighth Rector of Calvary Church, chose St. Michael as the patron saint of Calvary in 1923. The twelfth Rector, the Rev. Samuel Shoemaker, reaffirmed this choice in the 1950s. Ever since, St. Michael has been Calvary's patron. Ralph Adams Cram included numerous images of Michael throughout the building. There are at least twelve images of Michael including stained glass windows, statues behind the High Altar and All Saints’ Chapel Altar and War Memorial Cross, to the shield on the Rector’s Chair.

== Sheldon Calvary Camp ==
In 1936, Calvary Congregation recognized a need to engage its youth during summer months. Through a gift of Mrs. Harry E. Sheldon, Calvary purchased the YMCA Camp Porter (renamed The Harry E. Sheldon-Calvary Camp) on the shores of Lake Erie near Conneaut, Ohio. An endowment for maintenance was started by an additional twenty-five Calvary Parishioners. The property comprised fifty-two acres, with a lake frontage of a thousand feet with buildings and equipment. Later several permanent cabins, showers, administration buildings, a craft house and a dispensary were built and the property improved with athletic fields. The cost of these additions were met by gifts of members of the congregation. Calvary Camp continues to the present day as a ministry of the Diocese of Pittsburgh with sponsorship from Calvary Church.

== 2003 lawsuit ==
In 2003, Calvary Episcopal Church sued the Pittsburgh Diocese and Bishops Robert Duncan and Henry Scriven over actions taken by a special convention the Diocese held after the 2003 General Convention. At the special convention, the Diocese had passed a resolution that asserted that all property of individual parishes belonged to the parishes themselves, rather than to the diocese. In the suit, Calvary claimed that the Diocese could not take such an action, as it violated the Dennis Canon. Eventually, the suit was settled out of court. The final settlement did not affirm Calvary Church's central contention that diocesan property was held in trust for the national church, but it created a process by which the diocese agreed to make decisions about property and assets should a congregation wish to leave the diocese.

== Archbishop Desmond Tutu ==
Archbishop Desmond Tutu visited Pittsburgh and delivered a sermon to an audience of 1,100 on Thursday, October 25, 2007 in Calvary Church. A tablet was erected to commemorate the event. During this visit, Archbishop Tutu was given honorary degrees from Carnegie Mellon University and the University of Pittsburgh.

== Rectors ==
- The Rev. William H. Paddock, January 1855–April 1858
- The Rev. Robert B. Peet, January 1859–January 1867
- The Rev. Joseph D. Wilson, May 1867–February 1874
- The Rev. Boyd Vincent, D.D., April 1874–January 1889
- The Rev. George Hodges, D.D. D.C.L., January 1889–January 1894
- The Rev. William D. Maxon, D.D., May 1894–December 1898
- The Rev. James H. McIlvaine, D.D., June 1900–October 1916
- The Rev. Edwin J. van Etten, D.D., November 1917–August 1940
- The Rev. Arthur B. Kinsolving II, D.D., November 1940–May 1945
- The Rev. Lauriston L. Scaife, D.D., S.T.D., July 1945–May 1948
- The Rev. William W. Lumpkin, A.B., B.D., June 1948–September 1951
- The Rev. Samuel M. Shoemaker, D.D., S.T.D., March 1952–December 1961
- The Rev. John-Karl M. Baiz, June 1962–May 1984
- The Rev. Arthur F. McNulty, Jr., July 1985–September 1994
- The Rev. Harold T. Lewis, Ph.D., September 1996–November 2012
- The Rev. Jonathon W. Jensen, M.Div., February 2014–Present

== Organists ==
- Belle White, Organist, c.1855–1868
- Sarah Killikelly, Organist, 1868–1889
- Carl Retter, Organist-Choirmaster, 1889–1898
- Hermon B. Keese, Organist-Choirmaster, 1898–1899
- Gilden R. Broadberry, Organist-Choirmaster, 1899–1907
- James E. Bagley, Organist-Choirmaster, 1907–1910
- Dr. Harvey Gaul, Organist-Choirmaster, 1910–1945
- Dr. J. Julius Baird, Organist-Choirmaster, 1946–1954
- Donald Wilkins, Organist-Choirmaster, 1954–1997
- Dr. Alan Lewis, Director of Music, 1997–present

== Notable historical figures ==
- James W. Brown, United States Congressman
- William J. Diehl, 38th Mayor of Pittsburgh
- Henry Clay Frick, American Industrialist
- George W. Guthrie, 42nd Mayor of Pittsburgh, United States Ambassador to Japan
- Elsie Hilliard Hillman, Philanthropist & Political Activist
- Henry Hillman, American Businessman & Industrialist
- William N. McNair, 49th Mayor of Pittsburgh
- Jacob J. Miller, Judge
- David A. Reed, United States Senator
- Cornelius D. Scully, 50th Mayor of Pittsburgh
- William Wilkins, American Judge and Politician
