= Brewster Yale Beach =

Episcopal canon and Jungian psychotherapist from New York

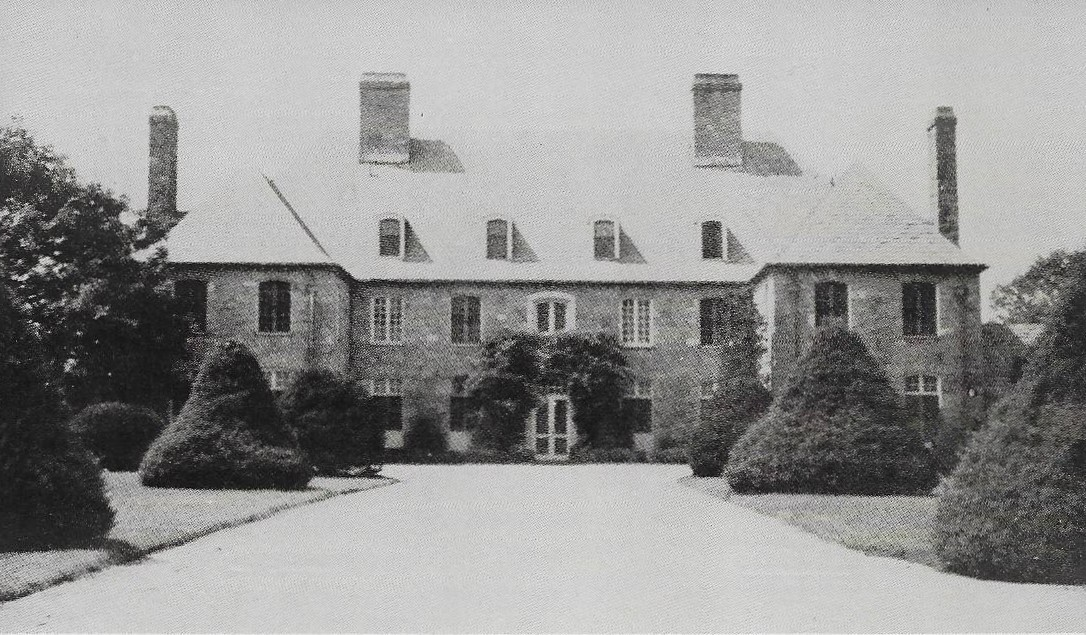
The center for Jungian Studies, founded by Beach in Rye, New York, seated at Wainwright House, built by Congressman J. Mayhew Wainwright

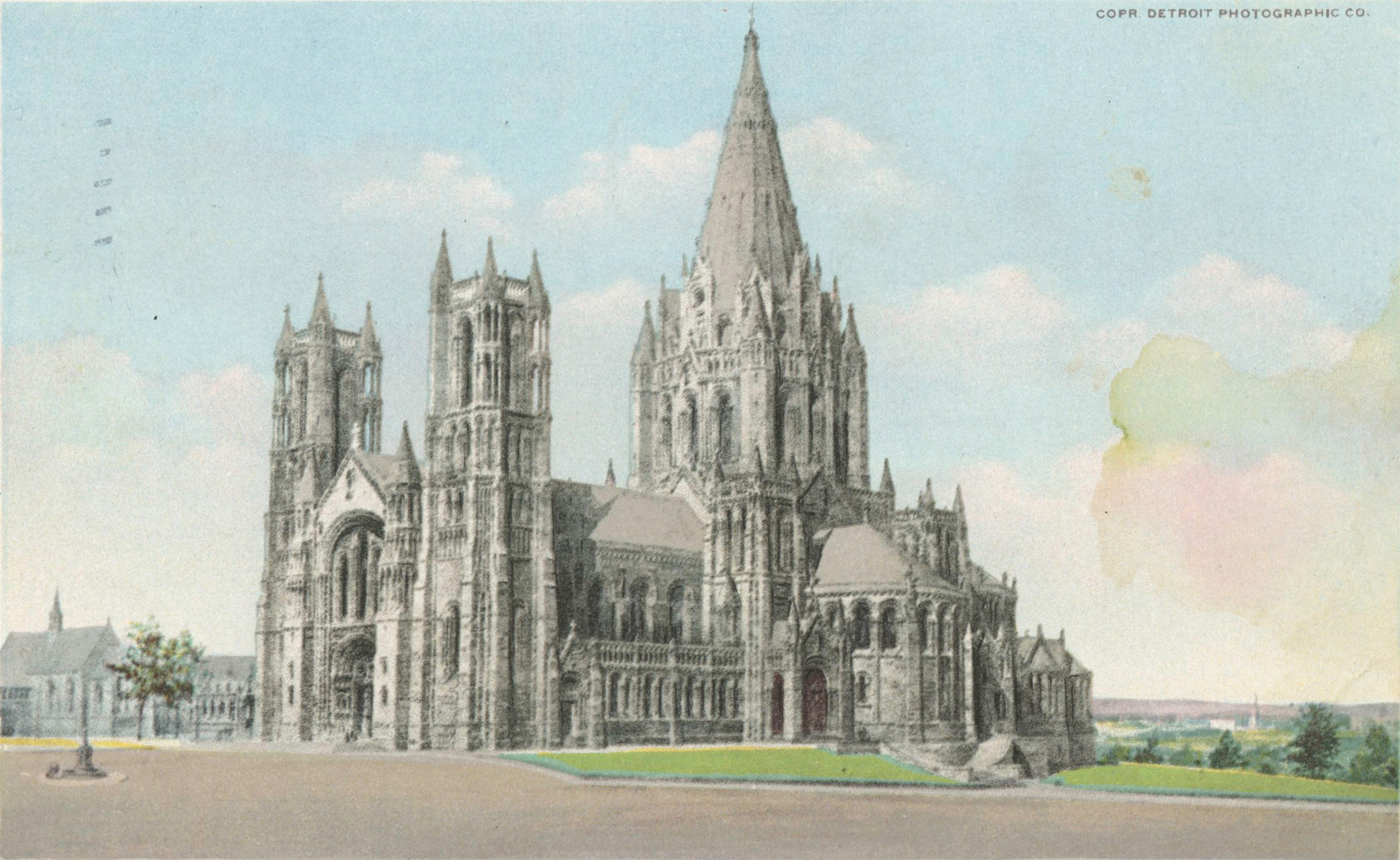
Cathedral of St. John the Divine, New York, where Beach was deacon

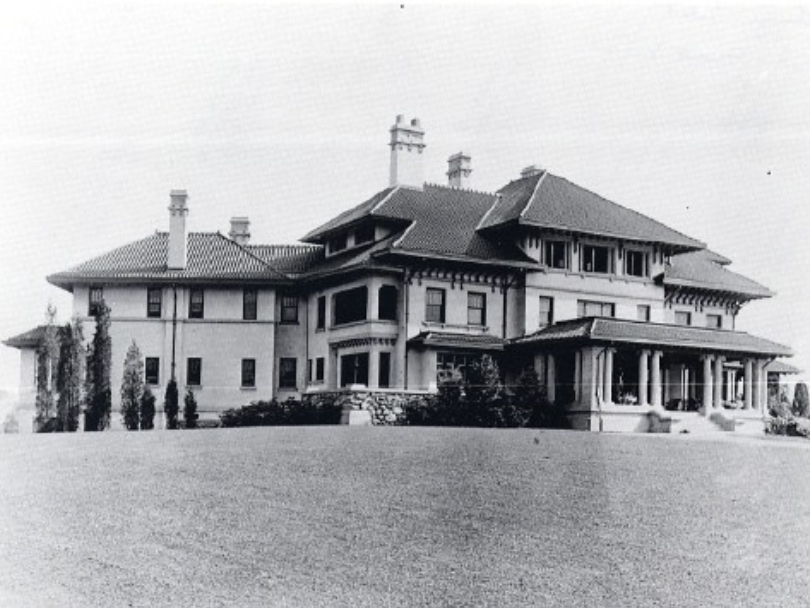
Cliffdale Estate of Beach's aunt and granduncle, the Kenyons, in 1913, Poughkeepsie, New York

Reverend Brewster Yale Beach (1925 – 2008) was an Episcopal minister, vicar and renowned Jungian psychotherapist in Manhattan. He became deacon of the Cathedral of St. John the Divine in New York, and canon by Bishop J. Brooke Mosley in Delaware. He founded the center for Jungian Studies in Rye, New York, and was elected director of Christian education for the State of Delaware.

Toward the later part of his life, he brought American-Mexican War documents to Associated Press's CEO Tom Curley, proving the founding of America's oldest news agency by his ancestor, Moses Yale Beach, rather than James Gordon Bennett Sr.

== Biography ==
Brewster Yale Beach was born in Brooklyn Heights, New York, on February 10, 1925, to Orlena Weed and Brewster Sperry Beach, members of the Beach and Yale families. His father was a reporter and head of the public-relations department of McKesson Corporation, while his grandfather, William B. Beach, a Cornell University graduate, was president of the Bridgeport Steam Heating Company.

His great-grandfather was politician Moses S. Beach, son of newspaper publisher Moses Yale Beach, founder of the Associated Press. His aunt Helen Kenyon was the first woman chair of Vassar College and member of the board of trustees. She was also the first female moderator of the Congregational Church in America, and lived at the Cliffdale Estate in Poughkeepsie, New York, built by her father in 1913, under architect Percival Lloyd.

Beach was educated at Darrow School in New York, and graduated from Yale University in 1947 with Phi Beta Kappa honor in the field of sociology. During his time at Yale, he was drafted into the Army, but due to an illness, was stuck at the Army base in Trenton, and was put under anesthesia by the doctors.

His wife, whom he married in 1949, was Dorothy Winder Okie, niece of Rev. William Henry Laird, an Episcopal Church clergyman.

He graduated in 1950 from Virginia Theological Seminary, became deacon of the Cathedral of St. John the Divine in New York, and assistant rector and vicar of St. John's Episcopal Church by Bishop Arthur R. McKinstry.

In 1956, Beach was made canon preceptor in Delaware by Bishop J. Brooke Mosley. He was the founder and vicar of the Church of the Nativity, Manor Park, and was director of Christian education for the Episcopal Diocese of Delaware. He was also director of Camp Arrowhead in Lewes, Delaware. Beach represented Delaware at the consecration of Bishop Coadjutor, Francisco Reus-Froylan, whose diocese was affiliated with Puerto Rico.

As an Episcopal minister, he gave various speeches in various states on Carl Jung's ideas, linking psychology with religion. His speech at the Young Women's Christian Association of Ridgewood was named "Who am I?, In Search for Meaning", and was the conference theme. In the mid-1960s, he moved to New York City, and began his studies at the C. G. Jung Institute of New York, graduating in 1967, and was dedicated to Jungian psychology. He thereafter graduated from Drew University with a Master in psychology. He gave talks at the Carl Jung Institute of New York, and became the founder of the center for Jungian Studies in Rye, New York, seated at Wainwright House, built by Congressman J. Mayhew Wainwright.

In the late 1960s, he became the head and executive director of the Delaware Pastoral Institute under board directors Mrs. A. Felix du Pont Jr., Bishop J. Brooke Mosley, prelate Gordon T. Charlton Jr., William Henry Dupont, and others. The interdenominational Pastoral Institute, backed by the Episcopal Diocese of Delaware, was formed to assist the clergy in their ministry work, and to help with counselling services and access to psychiatrists.

== Later life ==
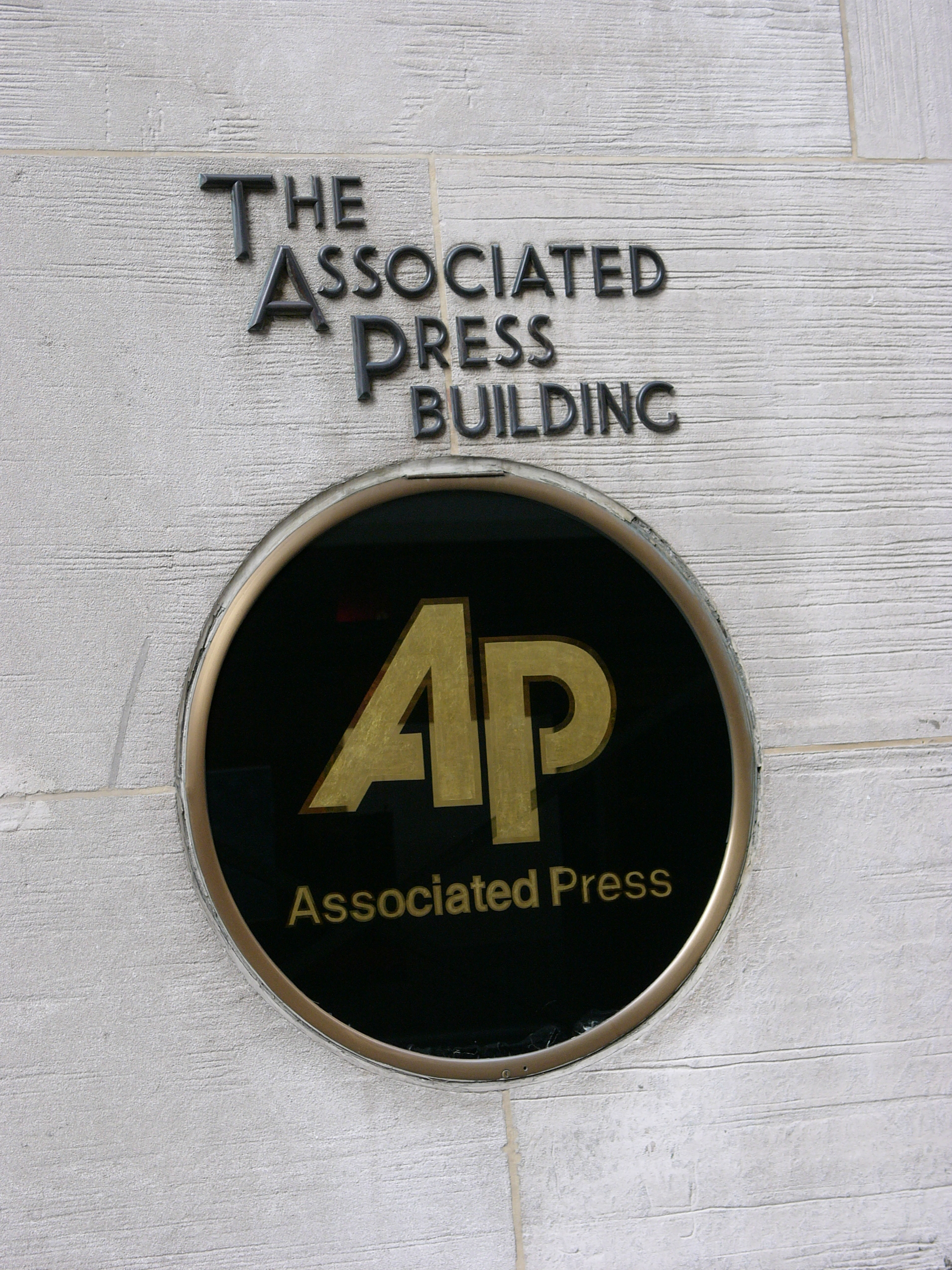
The Associated Press Building in New York City

Beach embraced the ideas of psychology pioneer Carl Jung, practiced psychotherapy for 25 years in Manhattan, and became a renowned Jungian psychotherapist in New York. In 1983, he moved to Dutchess County and worked as a Jungian analyst and Episcopal priest. He served as vicar of St Peter's for nine years, and with his wife, presided over a forum on religion, psychology and the arts named Symposia of Dutchess County. He was also a member of the American Association of Pastoral Counselors and the International Association for Analytical Psychology.

In 2006, Beach donated Mexican–American War documents relating to his ancestor Moses Yale Beach, which brought new informations toward the date of Associated Press's founding, making it two years earlier, and crediting Moses Yale Beach for its foundation rather than James Gordon Bennett Sr. of the New York Herald as previously thought. The agency, founded in 1846, became the largest and oldest news organization in the United States. Historian Menahem Blondheim, adviser of Steven Spielberg, referred to the founding motivation as a decision to share news with rivals, rich or poor, to be on par with the speed of the telegraph during the war.

The discovery was qualified by Associated Press's CEO Tom Curley, as a "significant discovery, not only for the historical record of The Associated Press but because they also reaffirm the AP's fundamental role, covering the news in war and peace, as envisioned by the member newspapers that created it". A special reception was organized by the AP for Brewstwer Yale Beach and his family on this occasion, organized at their headquarters in New York, the Five Manhattan West building, previously the 50 Rockefeller Plaza.

Beach died in Staatsburg, Dutchess County, New York, on June 17, 2008.
