= Sean Rowe =

American Episcopal bishop (born 1975)

The Most Reverend Sean Rowe
- 28th Presiding Bishop of the Episcopal Church
- Rowe in 2026
- Church: The Episcopal Church
- In office: 2024–present
- Predecessor: Michael Curry
- Previous posts: Provisional Bishop of Western New York (2019–2024); Provisional Bishop of Bethlehem (2014–2018); Bishop of Northwestern Pennsylvania (2007–2024)

Orders
- Ordination: December 2, 2000 by Robert D. Rowley
- Consecration: September 8, 2007 by Katharine Jefferts Schori

Personal details
- Born: Sean Walter Rowe; February 16, 1975 (age 51) Sharon, Pennsylvania, U.S.
- Denomination: Episcopalian
- Spouse: Carly Rowe
- Children: 1
- Education: Grove City College; Virginia Theological Seminary; Gannon University

Sean Walter Rowe (born February 16, 1975) is an American bishop who is serving as the 28th presiding bishop and primate of the Episcopal Church since 2024.

Ordained as a priest in 2000, Rowe served for 7 years as rector for Saint John's Episcopal Church in Franklin, Pennsylvania and was ordained and consecrated as the 8th bishop of Northwestern Pennsylvania in September 2007, a position in which he remained for 17 years before succeeding Michael Curry as Presiding Bishop of the Episcopal Church in November 2024. Rowe has also served as a provisional bishop for both the Episcopal Diocese of Bethlehem and the Episcopal Diocese of Western New York.

He was the youngest Episcopal priest in the United States at the time of his ordination to the priesthood in 2000, and was the youngest member of the House of Bishops upon his consecration as a bishop in 2007 at the age of 32.

== Early life and education ==
Born in Sharon, Pennsylvania, Rowe grew up in nearby Hermitage. Both his grandfathers were steelworkers, while his father worked for the state parole board and his mother at a local auto plant. He was active in the boy scouts and was elected class president in his final year at Hickory High School in Hermitage. Although his mother's background was Roman Catholic and his father's was in the United Church of Christ, Rowe attended Hickory Global Methodist Church, where he felt his first call to church leadership. He studied for a B.A. in history from Grove City College, where the chair of the history department, an Episcopal priest, introduced him to the Episcopal Church.

He later received an M.Div. from Virginia Theological Seminary and a Ph.D. in organizational learning and leadership from Gannon University. Ordained in 2000, he served as rector of Saint John's Episcopal Church in Franklin, Pennsylvania, from 2000 to 2007.

== Bishop of Northwestern Pennsylvania ==
Rowe was elected Bishop of Northwestern Pennsylvania in 2007 at the age of 32, making him the youngest member of the House of Bishops. At the election, which was held at the Cathedral of Saint Paul in Erie, Pennsylvania, on May 19, 2007, he was elected on the first ballot from a slate of four candidates, with 64 lay votes and 29 clergy votes.

His consecration took place on September 8, 2007, and the consecrators included Katharine Jefferts Schori, Robert D. Rowley, Mark Dyer, Ralph E. Jones of the Evangelical Lutheran Church in America, Arthur Williams and Wayne P. Wright.

In 2008, Rowe was appointed to the theology faculty at Gannon University. The following year he was granted an honorary doctorate in divinity from the Virginia Theological Seminary. In 2022 he was awarded the House of Deputies Medal.

=== Provisional Bishop of Bethlehem ===
In 2014 Rowe was elected to serve as Provisional Bishop of Bethlehem in eastern Pennsylvania, receiving all 64 clergy votes and 99 of the 100 lay votes in the election. He continued to serve as Bishop of Northwestern Pennsylvania at the same time, until the Right Reverend Kevin D. Nichols became Bishop of Bethlehem in 2018.

=== Provisional Bishop of Western New York ===
In 2017 Rowe sent a letter, along with the Right Reverend R. William Franklin of the Episcopal Diocese of Western New York and the chairs of the standing committees of the dioceses of Northwestern Pennsylvania and Western New York, proposing the creation of "a unique partnership in which the two dioceses would share a single bishop, a single staff". Following consultations across the region, both standing committees approved an arrangement to "share a bishop and staff for five years while exploring a long-term relationship". A joint convention of dioceses was held on October 26, 2018, in Niagara Falls, and the plan was approved by a wide margin.

Rowe became Provisional Bishop of Western New York on April 7, 2019, upon the retirement of the Right Reverend William Franklin, and in 2022 the two standing committees voted to extend the partnership by two years.

== Presiding Bishop of the Episcopal Church ==
Rowe at St. Mark's Cathedral in Minneapolis in 2026

On April 2, 2024, Rowe was announced as a candidate to succeed Michael Curry as presiding bishop of the Episcopal Church, at the election to be held at the 81st General Convention in Louisville, Kentucky, on June 26, 2024.

Meeting at Christ Church Cathedral, Louisville, the House of Bishops elected Rowe with 89 of 158 votes cast on the first ballot. His election was later ratified by the laity and clergy in the House of Deputies. He was the youngest person to serve as presiding bishop when his nine-year term began on November 1, 2024.

In a break with tradition, Rowe announced that his installation would be held at the Episcopal Church's headquarters in New York, rather than at the National Cathedral in Washington, D.C. The scaled-down service, intended to reduce the event's carbon footprint, took place on November 2, 2024, at the Chapel of Christ the Lord in the Episcopal Church Center, and was attended by Rowe's predecessors, Michael Curry and Katharine Jefferts Schori. It contained prayers, readings and hymns in English, Spanish, French, Mandarin, Arabic, Hebrew and other languages, and in his sermon, based on the story of Lazarus of Bethany, Rowe emphasized the importance of supporting the ministries at the congregational and diocesan levels.

On November 6, 2024, the day after the 2024 United States presidential election, Rowe sent a letter to members of the Episcopal Church, stating "We are Christians who support the dignity, safety, and equality of women and LGBTQ+ people as an expression of our faith", adding "I pray that President Trump and his administration will do the same."

On January 9, 2025, Rowe officiated at the state funeral of President Jimmy Carter, held at Washington National Cathedral.

On July 3, 2025, Rowe authored an opinion piece in Religion News Service titled "Once the church of presidents, the Episcopal Church must now be an engine of resistance". In it, he criticized the Episcopal Church's longstanding "intermingling" with the American federal government, and advocated for continued resistance against the second Trump administration's "overreach and recklessness".

== Personal life ==
Rowe is married to Carly Rowe, with whom he has one daughter.

Episcopal Church (USA) titles
Preceded by Robert D. Rowley	8th Bishop of Northwestern Pennsylvania; 2007–2024	Succeeded by Vacant
Preceded by Michael Curry	28th Presiding Bishop of the Episcopal Church; 2024–present	Incumbent
