= Edward Pinkney Wroth =

The Right Reverend Edward Pinkney Wroth D.D.
- Bishop of Erie
- Church: Episcopal Church
- Diocese: Erie
- Elected: June 1943
- In office: 1943–1946
- Predecessor: John C. Ward
- Successor: Harold E. Sawyer

Orders
- Ordination: March 17, 1918 by John Gardner Murray
- Consecration: September 16, 1943 by Henry St. George Tucker

Personal details
- Born: February 11, 1889 Darlington, Maryland, United States
- Died: June 22, 1946 (aged 57) Erie, Pennsylvania, United States
- Denomination: Anglican
- Parents: Edward Worrell Wroth & Margret Gilpin Price
- Spouse: Marjorie Virginia Hamill
- Children: 3

Edward Pinkney Wroth (January 11, 1889 – June 22, 1946) was the third bishop of the Episcopal Diocese of Erie, now Northwestern Pennsylvania.

== Early life and education ==
Wroth was born on January 11, 1889, in Darlington, Maryland, the son of the Reverend Edward Worrell Wroth (1851-1924) and Margret Gilpin Price Wroth (1858-1924). He was educated at the schools of Baltimore and the Latin school of Baltimore. He studied at Trinity College, Hartford and graduated with a Bachelor of Arts in 1915. He also graduated from the Virginia Theological Seminary with a Bachelor of Divinity in 1917.

== Ordained ministry ==
Wroth was made deacon on April 29, 1917 in All Saints' Church, Baltimore, and ordained priest on March 17, 1918, both times by Bishop John Gardner Murray of Maryland. He was assigned to Christ Church in Baltimore, the church where he was ordained priest. In 1918 he became rector of Trinity Church in Baltimore. Later he served as rector of Ascension Church in Washington, D.C., of St Peter's parish in Poolesville, Maryland, St Philip's in Laurel, Maryland and rector of Christ Church in Washington, D.C. In 1930, he became rector of Trinity Memorial Church in Warren, Pennsylvania.

== Bishop ==
Wroth was elected Bishop of Erie on the eighth ballot, during the 33rd Annual diocesan convention which took place in 1943. He was consecrated on September 16, 1943 with Presiding Bishop Henry St. George Tucker as chief consecrator in St Paul's Cathedral, Erie, Pennsylvania. Wroth died in office three years later, on June 22, 1946, in Erie, due to Coronary thrombosis.
