= William Crittenden =

The Right Reverend William Crittenden D.D., LL.D.
- Bishop of Erie
- Church: Episcopal Church
- Diocese: Erie
- Elected: April 26, 1952
- In office: 1952–1973
- Predecessor: Harold E. Sawyer
- Successor: Donald J. Davis

Orders
- Ordination: May 31, 1935 by Henry Knox Sherrill
- Consecration: June 26, 1952 by Henry Knox Sherrill

Personal details
- Born: June 28, 1908 New Boston, Pennsylvania, United States
- Died: September 8, 2003 (aged 95) Stokesdale, North Carolina, United States
- Denomination: Anglican
- Parents: Ernest H. Crittenden & Susan Beatrice Cook
- Spouse: Eleanor Elizabeth Setchel
- Children: 2
- Education: Lafayette College

William K. Crittenden (June 28, 1908 - September 8, 2003) was the fifth Bishop of Erie in The Episcopal Church between 1952 and 1973.

== Early life and education ==
Crittenden was born in New Boston, Pennsylvania, on June 28, 1908, the son of Ernest H. Crittenden and Susan Beatrice Cook. He was educated at the high school of Hazleton, Pennsylvania. He then studied at Lafayette College in Easton, Pennsylvania, from where he graduated with a Bachelor of Science in 1929. He then worked for the Bell Telephone Company from 1929 to 1933. In 1931 he married Eleanor Elizabeth Setchel and together had two children. In 1936 he graduated with a Bachelor of Divinity from Episcopal Theological Seminary. He was awarded a Doctor of Divinity from Lafayette College and a Doctor of Law from Gannon University in 1963, the latter being a recognition by the Roman Catholic Church for his ecumenical work.

== Ordained ministry ==
He was ordained deacon in 1934 and priest a on May 31, 1935, by Bishop Henry Knox Sherrill. Between 1934 and 1935, he served as curate of St Paul's Church in Brookline, Massachusetts, after which he became as vicar of Grace Church in Dalton, Massachusetts, and St Luke's Church in Lanesborough, Massachusetts. In 1939 he became rector of St John's Church in North Adams, Massachusetts, while in 1942 he became chaplain, assistant professor of religion, and assistant to the president at Lafayette College. Between 1945 and 1949 he was the executive secretary of the Division for Youth of the Episcopal Church. On December 20, 1949, he became Archdeacon of Southern Ohio, a post he retained till 1952.

== Episcopacy ==
Crittenden was elected Bishop of Erie on the third ballot on April 26, 1952, during a special convention. He was consecrated in St Paul's Cathedral in Erie, Pennsylvania, on June 26, 1952, by Presiding Bishop Henry Knox Sherrill. He was well known for his ecumenical work throughout his episcopacy. He retired on December 31, 1973, and moved to Mexico in 1974 to teach ethics at the University of Guadalajara. He died on September 8, 2003, in Stokesdale, North Carolina.
