= William H. Mead =

Bishop of the Episcopal Diocese of Delaware

The Right Reverend William Henry Mead D.D.
- Bishop of Delaware
- Church: Episcopal Church
- Diocese: Delaware
- Elected: June 28, 1968
- In office: 1968–1974
- Predecessor: J. Brooke Mosley
- Successor: William Hawley Clark

Orders
- Ordination: January 14, 1951 by Russell S. Hubbard
- Consecration: November 15, 1968 by John E. Hines

Personal details
- Born: January 11, 1921 Detroit, Michigan, United States
- Died: February 25, 1974 (aged 53) Wilmington, Delaware, United States
- Buried: St. Anne's Episcopal Church (Middletown, Delaware)
- Denomination: Anglican
- Spouse: Katherine Baldwin Lloyd (m. July 1, 1950)
- Children: 2

William Henry Mead (January 11, 1921 – February 25, 1974) was an American bishop. He was bishop of the Episcopal Diocese of Delaware from 1968 to 1974.

== Biography ==
Mead was born in Detroit, Michigan on January 11, 1921. He was educated at Cranbrook School and later studied at the University of Michigan, and then Lake Forest College He then had a brief business career in the automobile industry. He also graduated from the Virginia Theological Seminary in 1950 with a Bachelor of Divinity.

Mead was ordained deacon in 1950 and priest in 1951. On July 1, 1950, he married Katherine Baldwin Lloyd. He served as assistant priest of Christ Church Cranbrook in Bloomfield Hills, Michigan. In 1952 he became rector of St Paul's Church in Alexandria, Virginia, while in 1957 he became the associate director of the Parishfleld Community Church in Brighton, Michigan. Between 1959 and 1964, he was the rector of the Church of St John the Evangelist in Saint Paul, Minnesota. On May 10, 1964, he became Dean of Christ Church Cathedral in St. Louis, Missouri.

He was elected Bishop of Delaware on June 28, 1968, and was consecrated bishop on November 15 of the same year by Presiding Bishop John E. Hines in Christ the King Catholic Church. He retained the post till his death on February 25, 1974, due to a heart attack in Wilmington, Delaware.
