= William Hawley Clark =

The Right Reverend William Hawley Clark S.T.M.
- Bishop of Delaware
- Church: Episcopal Church
- Diocese: Delaware
- Elected: January 24, 1975
- In office: 1975–1985
- Predecessor: William H. Mead
- Successor: Cabell Tennis

Orders
- Ordination: April 1946 by Frank W. Creighton
- Consecration: May 16, 1975 by John Allin

Personal details
- Born: May 10, 1919 Escanaba, Michigan, United States
- Died: March 7, 1997 (aged 77) Kennett Square, Pennsylvania, United States
- Buried: St. Anne's Episcopal Church (Middletown, Delaware)
- Denomination: Anglican
- Spouse: Rosemary Ellen Lehman
- Children: 3

William Hawley Clark (May 10, 1919 – March 7, 1997) was bishop of the Episcopal Diocese of Delaware, serving as diocesan from 1975 to 1985. He was elected January 24, 1975, consecrated on May 16, 1975, and installed on May 18, 1975. Clark retired on December 31, 1985.

== Early life and education ==
William Hawley Clark was born in Escanaba, Michigan on May 10, 1919, the third child and only son of William James Clark and Elsie Hawley Clark. He graduated from Escanaba High School in 1937 and enrolled at the University of Michigan. In August 1939 he attended the World Conference of Christian Youth in Amsterdam. The onset of World War II held up his plans to study for his junior year abroad at the American University of Beirut. However, after spending the first months of the war in Normandy, France, he eventually made his way to the Middle East. He earned a Bachelor of Arts at the University of Michigan in 1942. While there he was president of the religious society where he met his future wife. On June 12, 1943, Clark married Rosemary Ellen Lehman of Fort Wayne, Indiana at St Andrew's Episcopal Church in Ann Arbor, Michigan. Clark attended Chicago Theological School and Episcopal Theological School. He earned a Bachelor of Divinity degree from ETS in 1945.

== Ordained ministry ==
Clark was ordained deacon in September 1945 by Bishop James De Wolf Perry of the Diocese of Rhode Island and priest in April 1946 by Bishop Frank W. Creighton of the Diocese of Michigan. He served the Episcopal parishes of St Paul's Flint, and Trinity, Flushing in the Episcopal Diocese of Michigan from 1945 to 1949. From 1949 to 1951 he served the parishes of St Peter's in Monroe, Connecticut and St Andrew's in Madison, Connecticut. In 1951 he was called to be rector of Trinity Church in Concord, Massachusetts. During his time there he taught at Episcopal Theological School, served on the standing committee of the diocese, and oversaw plans to expand Trinity in Concord by the building of a new church next to the older one. During the academic year of 1960–1961, he took a family sabbatical with his wife and three children to Canterbury, England. He studied at St Augustine's Abbey.

1963 letter from Hong Kong.

After one more year at Trinity, Concord, he joined the staff of the World Council of Churches in Geneva, Switzerland in 1962. He was Secretary of the Department of Cooperation Between Men and Women in Church, Family, and Society. His travels in this position took him throughout Europe as well as trips to India, Pakistan and Africa. In 1965 he was called to be rector of St Andrew's Church in Wellesley, Massachusetts. During his time there he again served on the standing committee of the diocese. He also fostered communication and cooperation among all the churches of the town. In 1973 he accepted a position as Executive Director of the Worcester County Ecumenical Council in Worcester, Massachusetts.

== Bishop ==
On January 24, 1975, he was elected diocesan bishop by a convention held at St David's Church in Wilmington, Delaware. His consecration was held in the Roman Catholic Church of Christ the King in Wilmington on May 16, 1975. E William Muehl, his roommate at the University of Michigan was the preacher. Presiding Bishop John Allin was principal consecrator and co-consecrators were the William Davidson of Western Kansas, and John Burgess of Massachusetts. On May 18, 1975, he was installed as the 8th Bishop of Delaware at the Cathedral of St John in Wilmington. As bishop, he attended the Lambeth Conference of 1978 in London and Canterbury, England.

He continued his work in the areas of ecumenical relations, affirming women to become priests and bishops, and ensuring that the diocese cared for the needs of the people of Delaware and the wider world. He retired as diocesan bishop on December 31, 1985. He and his wife moved to Falmouth, Massachusetts and he was active an Assisting Bishop in the Diocese of Massachusetts until 1991. In 1991 the couple moved to Kennett Square, Pennsylvania.

== Death ==
He died of a combination of cancer and Parkinson's disease on March 7, 1997, at his residence in Kennett Square. His funeral was held March 11, 1997 at the Cathedral Church of St John in Wilmington, with his successor, Rt Rev Cabell Tennis as preacher. Bishop Clark is buried in the “Bishop’s Row” section of the graveyard at Old Saint Anne's Church in Middletown, Delaware. His wife Rosemary died on December 25, 2014. The couple had two sons and one daughter and three grandchildren.
