= Harold E. Sawyer =

Naagin (Bengali TV Series)

The Right Reverend Harold Everett Sawyer S.T.D.
- Bishop of Erie
- Church: Episcopal Church
- Diocese: Erie
- Elected: September 4, 1946
- In office: 1946–1951
- Predecessor: Edward Pinkney Wroth
- Successor: William Crittenden

Orders
- Ordination: May 15, 1917 by Chauncey B. Brewster
- Consecration: November 6, 1946 by Henry St. George Tucker

Personal details
- Born: December 15, 1890 Clinton, Connecticut, United States
- Died: January 18, 1969 (aged 78)
- Denomination: Anglican
- Parents: Enoch Augustus Sawyer & Matella Julia Waterhouse

Harold Everett Sawyer (December 15, 1890 – January 18, 1969) was an American prelate who served as Bishop of Erie, Pennsylvania, from 1946 to 1951.

== Early life and education ==
Sawyer was born on December 15, 1890, in Clinton, Connecticut, the son of Enoch Augustus Sawyer and Matella Julia Waterhouse. He graduated from Trinity College with a Bachelor of Arts in 1913, and from General Theological Seminary in 1916. He also graduated with a Master of Arts from Columbia University in 1919. On May 28, 1947, the General Theological Seminary, conferred a Doctor of Sacred Theology upon Sawyer.

== Ordained ministry ==
Sawyer was ordained deacon in June 1916. He was ordained priest by the Bishop of Connecticut Chauncey B. Brewster on May 15, 1917, in Christ Church, New Haven. He served his diaconate between 1916 and 1917 as curate of the Church of the Redeemer in Morristown, New Jersey. On October 1, 1917, he became rector of St Agnes' Chapel, part of Trinity Parish in New York City. Between 1924 and 1946 he served as rector of Grace Church in Utica, New York.

== Bishop ==
Sawyer was elected Bishop of Erie on September 4, 1946, on the fifth ballot, during a special diocesan convention. He was consecrated on November 6, 1946, in Grace Church, by the Presiding Bishop Henry St. George Tucker. He retired in November 1951 and died on January 18, 1969.
