= Kevin S. Brown =

Church in USA

The Right Reverend Kevin S. Brown
- Bishop of Delaware
- Church: Episcopal Church
- Diocese: Delaware
- Elected: July 15, 2017
- In office: 2017–present
- Predecessor: Wayne P. Wright

Orders
- Ordination: 2007
- Consecration: December 9, 2017 by Michael Curry

Personal details
- Born: Asheville, North Carolina, United States
- Denomination: Anglican
- Spouse: Caroline Coolidge Brown
- Children: 2

Kevin S. Brown is the eleventh and current bishop of the Episcopal Church in the U.S. state of Delaware, presiding over the Episcopal Diocese of Delaware.

== Biography ==
Brown was raised in Asheville, North Carolina. He studied at Duke University and graduated with a double major in Psychology and Mathematics in 1991. In 1996, he graduated with a Master of Business Administration from the University of West Florida. He also served as an Acquisitions Officer in the United States Air Force, after which he moved to Memphis, Tennessee, where he worked in finance and marketing.

He earned his Master of Divinity from the General Theological Seminary in 2007 and was ordained deacon and priest. That same year, he became rector of Grace Church in Paris, Tennessee, and in 2010 became rector of the Church of the Holy Comforter in Charlotte, North Carolina. He was elected on July 15, 2017, on the fifth ballot, and was consecrated on December 9, 2017, with Presiding Bishop Michael Curry as chief consecrator. He received an honorary Doctor of Divinity from General Theological Seminary.
