= Immanuel Church Highlands (Wilmington, Delaware) =

Church

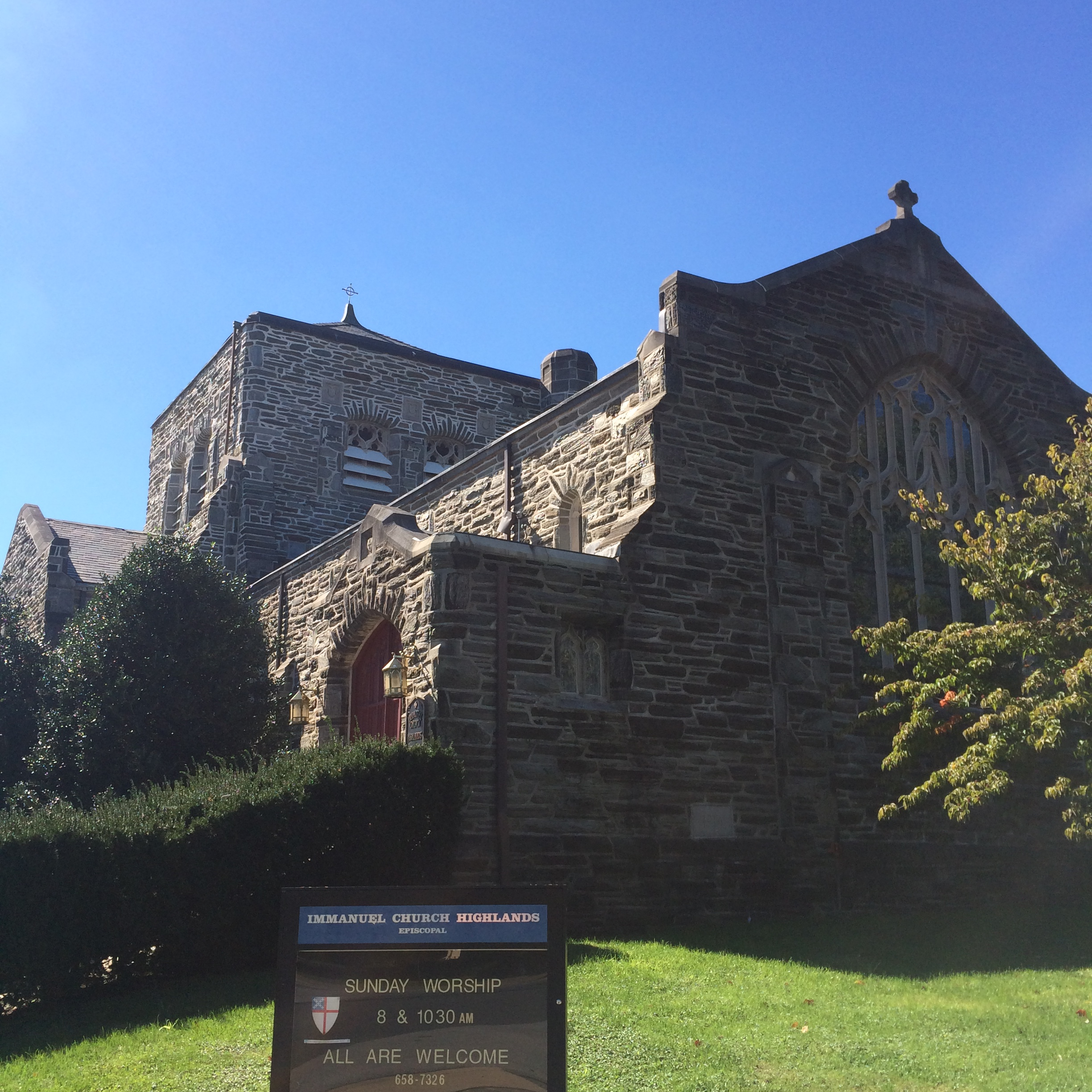

Religion
- Affiliation: Episcopal
- Deity: God
- Status: Open

Location
- Location: Wilmington, Delaware
- Country: United States
- Interactive map of Immanuel Church Highlands
- Coordinates: 39.761834°N 75.571919°W

Architecture
- Completed: 1914

Website
- Official website

The Immanuel Church Highlands is an Episcopal church in Wilmington, Delaware, in the United States. The church is part of the Episcopal Diocese of Delaware.

In 2015, the church reported 208 members; in 2023, it reported 144 members. No membership statistics were reported in 2024 national parochial reports. Plate and pledge financial support reported by the church in 2024 was $169,887. Average Sunday Attendance (ASA) reported in 2024 was 46 persons. This was a relative decrease from ASA of 93 reported in 2015.
