= John C. Ward =

The Right Reverend John Chamberlain Ward D.D.
- Bishop of Erie
- Church: Episcopal Church
- Diocese: Erie
- Elected: April 12, 1921
- In office: 1921–1943
- Predecessor: Rogers Israel
- Successor: Edward Pinkney Wroth

Orders
- Ordination: May 27, 1900 by William David Walker
- Consecration: September 22, 1921 by Daniel S. Tuttle

Personal details
- Born: August 27, 1873 Elmira, New York, United States
- Died: February 15, 1949 (aged 75) Buffalo, New York, United States
- Buried: Forest Hills Cemetery, Belmont, New York
- Denomination: Anglican
- Parents: Hamilton Ward & May Adelia Chamberlain

John Chamberlain Ward (August 27, 1873 – February 15, 1949) was second bishop of the Episcopal Diocese of Erie, now Northwestern Pennsylvania between 1921 and 1943.

== Biography ==
Ward was born on August 27, 1873, in Elmira, New York, the son of Hamilton Ward and May Adelia Chamberlain. He studied at Harvard College and graduated in 1896. He then studied at the General Theological Seminary, from here he graduated in 1899. He was ordained deacon on May 28, 1899, and priest on May 27, 1900, both by William David Walker, Bishop of Western New York. He then became rector of St Stephen's Church in Buffalo, New York, while in 1902 he became rector of Grace Church in Buffalo, New York, where he remained till 1921, except for the two years he spent as a military chaplain during the First World War.

Ward was elected Bishop of Erie on April 12, 1921, on the twenty second ballot, during a special diocesan convention. He was consecrated to the episcopate on September 22, 1921 with Presiding Bishop Daniel S. Tuttle as chief consecrator, in Grace Church, Buffalo, New York. He retained the post till his retirement in 1943. He died in Buffalo, New York, on February 15, 1949.

For service in the First World War, he received the Purple Heart, Distinguished Service Cross, British Military Cross, and the Croix de Guerre. After retirement on June 1, 1943, he was rejected at the age of 69 for military enlistment and subsequently lived at the Buffalo Club until his death.

His brother was New York State Attorney General Hamilton Ward, Jr.
