= Norman Coke-Jephcott =

British composer (1893–1962)

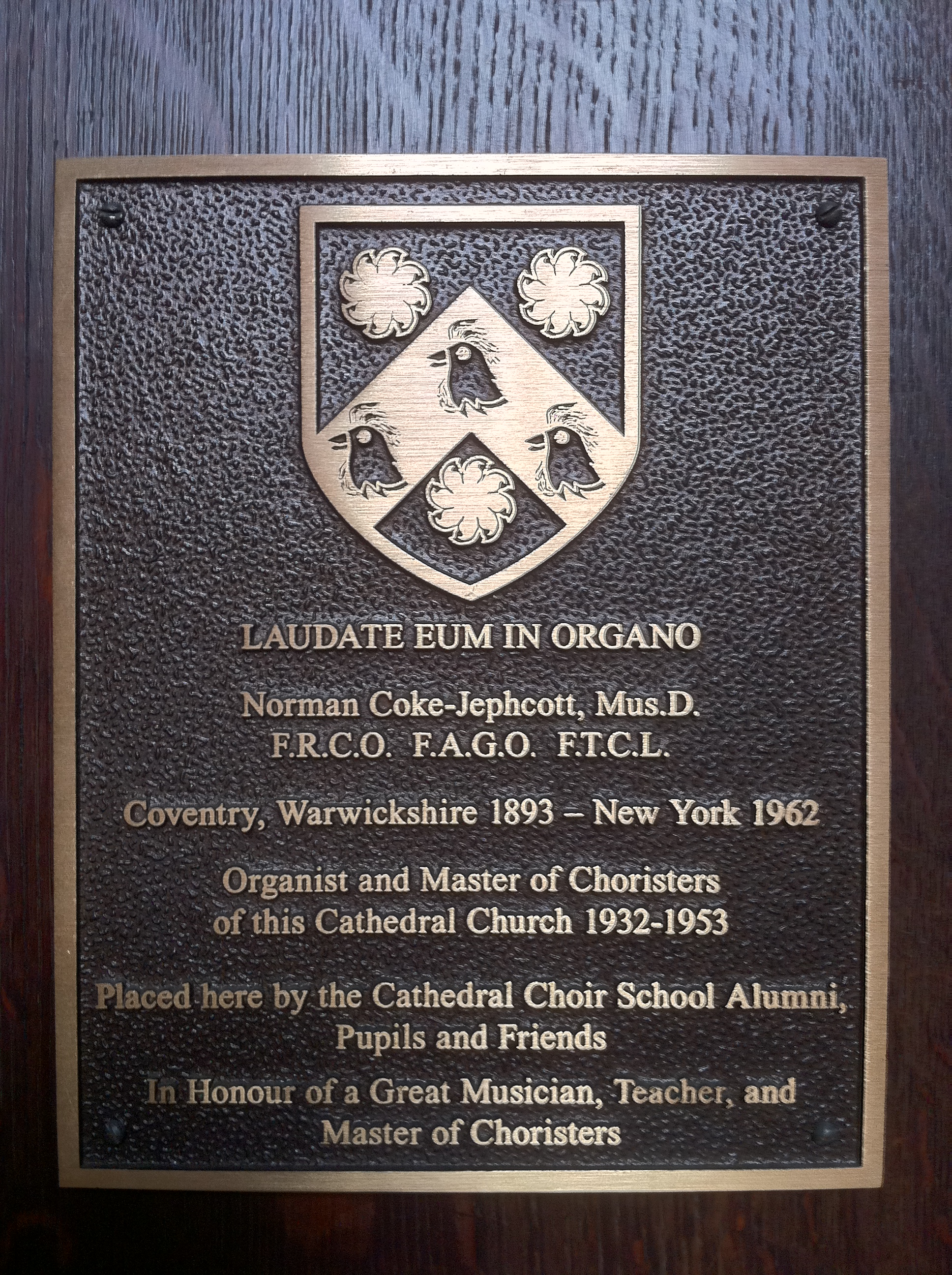
The memorial to Norman Coke-Jephcott in the Cathedral of St. John the Divine, New York

Norman Coke-Jephcott FRCO FAGO, FRCCO, FTCL (17 March 1893 – 14 March 1962) was an English composer and organist based both in his native England and the United States.

== Life ==
Norman Coke-Jephcott was born in Coventry on 17 March 1893. He was educated at Bablake School.

He was awarded his Fellowship of the Royal College of Organists in 1911. He was admitted Fellow of the American Guild of Organists (ad eundem) in 1912.

In 1945 he was admitted to the Fellowship in the Canadian College of Organists (honoris causa) and in the same year received the honorary degree of the D.Mus. from Ripon College in the same year.

He was made a Fellow of Trinity College, London in 1947.

Regarded by his colleagues as one of the world's greatest masters in organ improvisation, he had also to his credit over twenty published works.

== Appointments ==
- Assistant organist at Holy Trinity Church, Coventry 1909–1911
- Organist at Holy Cross Church, Kingston, New York 1911–1915
- Organist at the Church of the Messiah, Rhineback, New York 1915–1923
- Organist at Grace Church (Utica, New York) 1923–1932
- Organist and Master of the Choristers at the Cathedral of St. John the Divine, New York 1932–1953

== Compositions ==
His compositions include:

- Bishop's Promenade
- Surely the Lord is in this Place
- Classical Fugue on a subject by Paul Vidal
- Fantasie on a National Air
- Improvisation on an Irish Air
- The Peace of God, for a cappella choir
