= Episcopal Diocese of Northwestern Pennsylvania =

Episcopal Church diocese in the US

Coordinates: 42.12833°N 80.08806°W

Diocese of Northwestern Pennsylvania

Location
- Country: United States
- Ecclesiastical province: Province III
- Deaneries: 4

Statistics
- Congregations: 32 (2025)
- Members: 2,398 (2025)

Information
- Denomination: Episcopal Church
- Established: November 16, 1910
- Cathedral: Cathedral of St Paul

Current leadership
- Bishop: sede vacante

Map
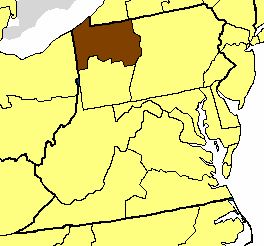
- Location of the Diocese of Northwestern Pennsylvania

Website
- www.dionwpa.org

The Episcopal Diocese of Northwestern Pennsylvania, originally the Episcopal Diocese of Erie is one of the 100 Dioceses of the Episcopal Church in the United States of America. The diocese is made up of 32 congregations located in the 13 contiguous counties of northwest Pennsylvania. The diocese is organized into four deaneries: Northeast (Forest, McKean, and Warren Counties), Northwest (Erie County), Southeast (Cameron County; Clarion County, except Foxburg Borough; Clearfield County, except Morris Township; Elk County; and Jefferson County), and Southwest (Crawford, Lawrence, Mercer, and Venango Counties and Foxburg Borough of Clarion County). The diocesan offices are located at 145 West 6th Street, Erie, PA 16501, across the street from Gannon University. The cathedral church is the Cathedral of Saint Paul, located at 134 West 7th Street, Erie, PA 16501.

In 2014, the diocese reported average Sunday attendance (ASA) of 1,385; in 2025, it reported 1,008. Between 2018 and 2025, reported membership decreased from 3,265 persons to 2,398. The 32 congregations of the diocese had $2,434,656 in plate and pledge income in 2025.

== Bishops ==
1. Rogers Israel (1911-1921)
2. John C. Ward (1921-1943)
3. Edward Pinkney Wroth (1943-1946)
4. Harold E. Sawyer (1946-1951)
5. William Crittenden (1952-1973)
6. Donald J. Davis (1974-1991)
7. Robert D. Rowley (1991-2006)
8. Sean W. Rowe (2007–2024)
9. Larry Benfield (assisting) (2025-2026)
10. Jenifer Chatfield (bishop-elect) (2026-)

== Churches within the Diocese of Northwestern PA ==
1. Cathedral of St. Paul (Erie, PA)
2. Christ Church (Oil City, PA)
3. Church of The Ascension (Bradford, PA)
4. Church of The Epiphany (Grove City, PA)
5. Church of The Holy Trinity (Houtzdale, PA)
6. Church of the Holy Trinity (Brookville, PA)
7. Church of our Saviour (DuBois, PA)
8. Emmanuel Episcopal Church (Corry, PA)
9. Emmanuel Episcopal Church (Emporium, PA)
10. Grace Episcopal Church (Lake City, PA)
11. Grace Episcopal Church (Ridgeway, PA)
12. Holy Cross Episcopal Church (North East, PA)
13. Memorial Church of Our Father (Foxburg, PA)
14. St. Agnes Episcopal Church (St. Marys, PA)
15. St. Andrew's Church (Clearfield, PA)
16. St. Augustine of Canterbury Church (Edinboro, PA)
17. St. Clement's (Greenville, PA)
18. St. Francis of Assisi Episcopal Church (Youngsville, PA)
19. St. James Memorial Episcopal Church (Titusville, PA)
20. St. John's Episcopal Church (Kane, PA)
21. St. John's Episcopal Church (Sharon, PA)
22. St. John's Episcopal Church (Franklin, PA)
23. St. Joseph Church (Allegany, PA)
24. St. Lawrence & Valley Mission (Osceola Mills, PA)
25. St. Luke's Episcopal Church (Smethport, PA)
26. St. Mark's Episcopal Church (Erie, PA)
27. St. Mary's Episcopal Church (Erie, PA)
28. St. Peter's Church (Waterford, PA)
29. St. Stephen's Episcopal Church (Fairview, PA)
30. Trinity Church (New Castle, PA)
31. Trinity Memorial Episcopal Church (Warren, PA)

== Former Episcopal Churches ==
St Luke's Episcopal church, formerly located in the village of Kinzua, but lost due to the construction of the Kinzua Dam on the Allegheny River.[6]

Source: "1941-04-05-STL-Service-Times-Wroth" Newspapers.com, Warren Times Mirror, April 5, 1941, https://www.newspapers.com/article/warren-times-mirror-1941-04-05-stl-servi/52953363/
