= Philip Cook (bishop) =

American bishop (1875–1938)

The Right Reverend Philip Cook
- Bishop of Delaware
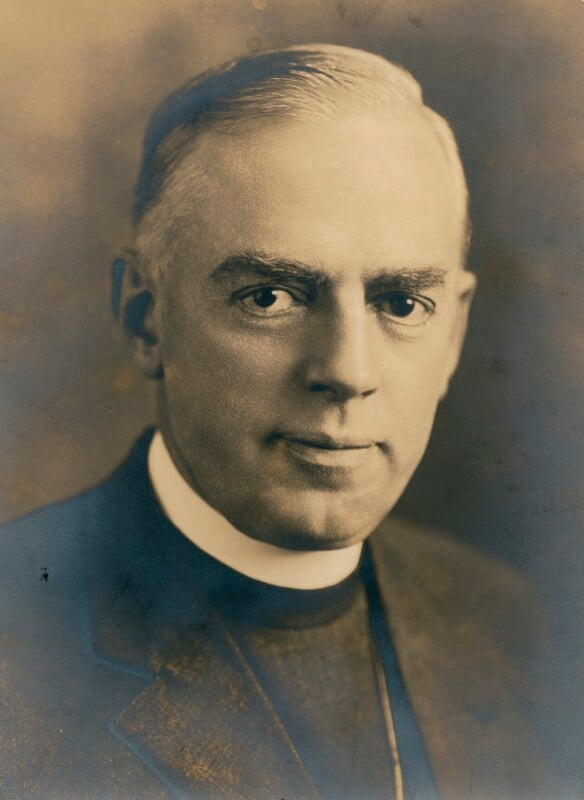
- Cook as bishop
- Church: Episcopal Church
- Diocese: Delaware
- Elected: May 12, 1920
- In office: 1920–1938
- Predecessor: Frederick Joseph Kinsman
- Successor: Arthur R. McKinstry

Orders
- Ordination: December 14, 1902 by Cameron D. Mann
- Consecration: October 14, 1920 by Daniel S. Tuttle

Personal details
- Born: July 4, 1875 Kansas City, Missouri, United States
- Died: March 25, 1938 (aged 62) Wilmington, Delaware. United States
- Denomination: Anglican
- Parents: John Darwin Shepherd Cook & Rosalie Barlow

Philip Cook (July 4, 1875 – March 25, 1938) was bishop of the Episcopal Diocese of Delaware, serving from 1920 to 1938.

== Biography ==
Cook was born in Kansas City, Missouri on July 4, 1875, son of John Darwin Shepherd Cook (1834-1909) and Rosalie Elvira Barlow (1838-1887). He was educated in the Kansas City public schools. He then studied at Trinity College in Hartford, Connecticut and graduated with a Bachelor of Arts in 1898. He also studied at the General Theological Seminary and graduated with a Bachelor of Divinity in 1902.

He was ordained deacon 1902 and priest on December 14, of the same year by Bishop Cameron D. Mann of North Dakota in Gethsemane Episcopal Cathedral (Fargo, North Dakota). Between 1903 and 1903, he served as a missionary in Towner, North Dakota, Rugby, North Dakota and Minot, North Dakota. In 1904 he was appointed assistant minister at the Chapel of the Incarnation in New York City, also serving as vicar of the chapel between 1908 and 1911. He then served as rector of St Mark's Church in San Antonio, Texas till 1916, after which he became rector of the Church of St Michael's and All Angels in Baltimore, Maryland.

On May 12, 1920, he was elected as Bishop of Delaware and was consecrated on October 14, 1920, by Presiding Bishop Daniel S. Tuttle as chief consecrator. As Bishop of Delaware he represented the province of Washington in the National Council for two years; served as chairman of the Commission on the Ministry and was assessor to two Presiding Bishops, to Bishop Perry and to Bishop Tucker. He died in office on March 25, 1938.
