= Wayne P. Wright =

The Right Reverend Wayne Parker Wright M.Div.
- Bishop of Delaware
- Church: Episcopal Church
- Diocese: Delaware
- Elected: February 28, 1998
- In office: 1998–2017
- Predecessor: Cabell Tennis
- Successor: Kevin S. Brown

Orders
- Ordination: 1980
- Consecration: June 20, 1998 by Robert D. Rowley

Personal details
- Born: 1951 (age 74–75) Williamsburg, Virginia, United States
- Denomination: Anglican
- Spouse: Holly Lee Brown
- Children: 1

Wayne Parker Wright (born 1951) was the tenth bishop of the Episcopal Diocese of Delaware from 1998 till 2017.

== Biography ==
Wright was born in 1951 and was raised in Williamsburg, Virginia. He studied at the College of William & Mary and graduated with a Bachelor of Arts in American History, after which he worked as a journalist for two years. He then studied at Sewanee: The University of the South and graduated with a Master of Divinity in 1980. He was ordained deacon and priest in the Diocese of Southern Virginia. Between July 1, 1980, and December 1986 he was the rector of St John's Church in Suffolk, Virginia. Whilst there, he also married Holly Lee Brown in 1985. In 1986 he became the rector of Grace Church in New Orleans, Louisiana. He also served as deputy to two General Conventions and as president of the National Network of Episcopal Clergy Associations.

Wright was elected Bishop of Delaware on February 28, 1998, and was consecrated on June 20, 1998, by Bishop Robert D. Rowley of Northwestern Pennsylvania, and co-consecrated by Charles Jenkins of Louisiana and Mary Adelia McLeod of Vermont, on the grounds of St Andrew's School, Middletown, Delaware. He was installed as the tenth Bishop of Delaware in St John's Cathedral, Wilmington, Delaware, on June 21. Wright retired on December 9, 2017.

== See also ==
- List of Episcopal bishops of the United States
- Historical list of the Episcopal bishops of the United States.
