= Rogers Israel =

Catholic bishop

The Right Reverend Rogers Israel D.D.
- Bishop of Erie
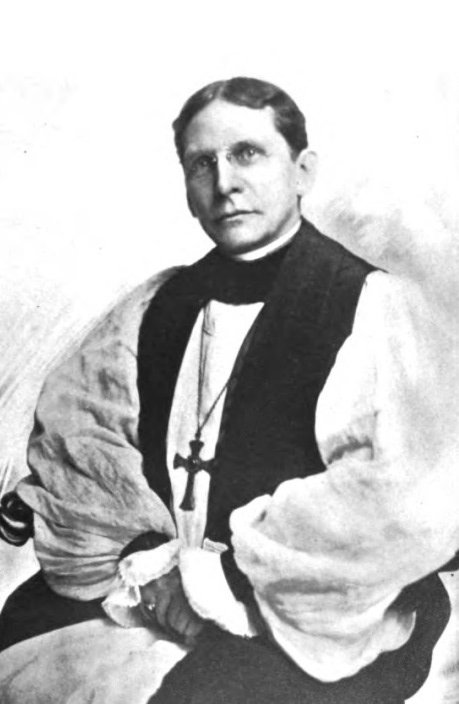
- Church: Episcopal Church
- Diocese: Erie
- Elected: November 16, 1910
- In office: 1911–1921
- Successor: John C. Ward

Orders
- Ordination: November 9, 1886 by Cortlandt Whitehead
- Consecration: February 24, 1911 by Cortlandt Whitehead

Personal details
- Born: September 14, 1854 Baltimore, Maryland, United States
- Died: January 11, 1921 (aged 66) Erie, Pennsylvania, United States
- Buried: Erie Cemetery
- Denomination: Anglican
- Parents: Thomas Beale Israel & Elizabeth Rogers Hiss
- Spouse: Sara Francis Graham

Rogers Israel (September 14, 1854 – January 11, 1921) was an American prelate who served as the first Bishop of Erie, from 1911 to 1921.

== Biography ==
Israel was born on September 14, 1854, in Baltimore, Maryland, the son of Thomas Beale Israel and Elizabeth Rogers Hiss. He was educated in private schools and later studied at Dickinson College from where he graduated with a Bachelor of Arts in 1881. He also earned his Master of Arts a year later from the same college and was awarded a Doctor of Divinity in 1900.

He was ordained deacon by Bishop Gregory T. Bedell of Ohio on November 11, 1885, and became assistant at Trinity Church in Cleveland, Ohio. On November 9, 1886, he was ordained priest by Bishop Cortlandt Whitehead of Pittsburgh, and became rector of Christ Church in Meadville, Pennsylvania. He then became rector of St Luke's Church in Scranton, Pennsylvania, in 1892, a post he retained until 1910.

In 1910 he was elected the first Bishop of the newly created Diocese of Erie and was consecrated on February 24, 1911, in St Luke's Church, Scranton, Pennsylvania, by Cortlandt Whitehead, Bishop of Pittsburgh. He died in office, on January 11, 1921, in Erie, Pennsylvania, due to shingles.
