= Cabell Tennis =

American Episcopalian prelate (1932–2026)

The Right Reverend Calvin Cabell Tennis J.D., M.Div.
- Bishop of Delaware
- Church: Episcopal Church
- Diocese: Delaware
- Elected: June 14, 1986
- In office: 1986–1997
- Predecessor: William Hawley Clark
- Successor: Wayne P. Wright

Orders
- Ordination: June 1, 1964 (transitional diaconate); December 19, 1964 (priesthood) by George P. Gunn
- Consecration: November 8, 1986 by Arthur Heath Light

Personal details
- Born: October 24, 1932 Hampton, Virginia, U.S.
- Died: February 7, 2026 (aged 93) Seattle, Washington, U.S.
- Denomination: Episcopalian
- Spouse: Hyde Southall Jones (m. 1954, d. 2022)
- Children: 4
- Education: College of William & Mary (B.A.), (J.D.); Virginia Theological Seminary (M.Div.)

Calvin Cabell Tennis (October 24, 1932 – February 7, 2026) was an American Episcopalian prelate who was the Bishop of Delaware from 1986 to 1997.

== Biography ==
Tennis was born in Hampton, Virginia, on October 24, 1932. He studied at the College of William & Mary from which he graduated with a Bachelor of Arts in 1954 and with a Juris Doctor, in 1956 after which he was admitted to the Virginia State Bar. Later, Tennis studied at the Virginia Theological Seminary from where he graduated with a Master of Divinity in 1964.

He was made deacon in 1964 and ordained to the priesthood on December 19, 1964. In 1964 he became curate at St John's Church in Portsmouth, Virginia, after which he became rector of Trinity Church in Buffalo, New York. In 1972 he became dean and rector of St Mark's Cathedral in Seattle. He also served as a deputy to the 1982 General Convention and was for a time adjunct professor at the General Theological Seminary.

On June 14, 1986, he was elected Bishop of Delaware and was consecrated on November 8, 1986, by Arthur Heath Light of Southwestern Virginia in St Helena's Roman Catholic Church in Wilmington, Delaware. Before his retirement, Tennis was one of the bishops involved in the heresy trial of Bishop Walter C. Righter for ordaining a gay person as a deacon.

Tennis retired on December 31, 1997, and died at his home in Seattle, Washington, on February 7, 2026, at the age of 93.
