= Leighton Coleman =

American bishop

The Right Reverend Leighton Coleman S.T.D., D.D., LL.D.
- Bishop of Delaware
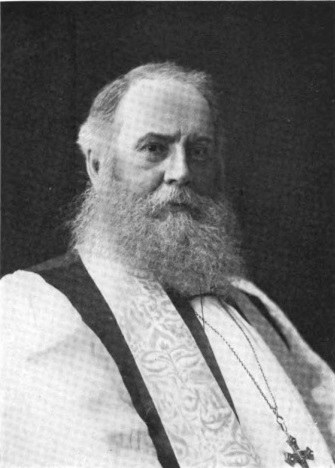
- Church: Episcopal Church
- Diocese: Delaware
- Elected: June 6, 1888
- In office: 1888–1907
- Predecessor: Alfred Lee
- Successor: Frederick Joseph Kinsman

Orders
- Ordination: May 15, 1862 by Horatio Potter
- Consecration: October 18, 1888 by Mark Antony De Wolfe Howe

Personal details
- Born: May 3, 1837 Philadelphia, Pennsylvania, United States
- Died: December 14, 1907 (aged 70) Wilmington, Delaware. United States
- Buried: Du Pont de Nemours Cemetery in Wilmington, Delaware
- Denomination: Anglican
- Parents: John Coleman & Margaretta Thomas
- Spouse: Frances Elizabeth DuPont

Leighton Coleman (May 3, 1837 - December 14, 1907) was an American clergyman of the Episcopal Church.

== Biography ==
He was born in Philadelphia, Pennsylvania, and graduated at the General Theological Seminary (New York City) in 1861. He was ordained deacon on July 1, 1860. From 1860 until 1862, he served as a missionary on Randalls and Wards Islands in New York. He was ordained priest on May 15, 1862.

He was rector of churches in Bustleton, Pa., Wilmington, Del., Mauch Chunk, Pa., Toledo, Ohio, and Sayre, Pennsylvania. He lived in England from 1879 to 1887.

In 1888 Leighton Coleman was consecrated the 2nd Bishop of Delaware in the Episcopal Church. His consecration was on January 18, 1889 with Daniel Sylvester Tuttle as chief consecrator.

Bishop Coleman was Grand Chaplain of the Grand Lodge of Masons of Pennsylvania and prelate of the Knights Templar, Chaplain General of the Society of the War of 1812, Chaplain of the Delaware Society of the Cincinnati, and Vice President of the Delaware Historical Society. He was elected a thirty-third degree Mason by the Consistory in Boston in September 1907.

== Bibliography ==
- A History of the Lehigh Valley (1872)
- The Church in America (1895)
- A History of the Church in the United States (1901, in the "Oxford Church Text Series")

== See also ==
- Raphael Morgan (Robert Josias Morgan, who was ordained to the Episcopal Deaconate by Bp. Coleman).

== Sources ==
- The New York Times. Bishop Coleman of Delaware Dies. Sunday December 15, 1907. Page 13. (Obituary)
