= Frederick Joseph Kinsman =

American bishop and church historian

The Right Reverend Frederick Joseph Kinsman D.D., LL.D.
- Bishop of Delaware
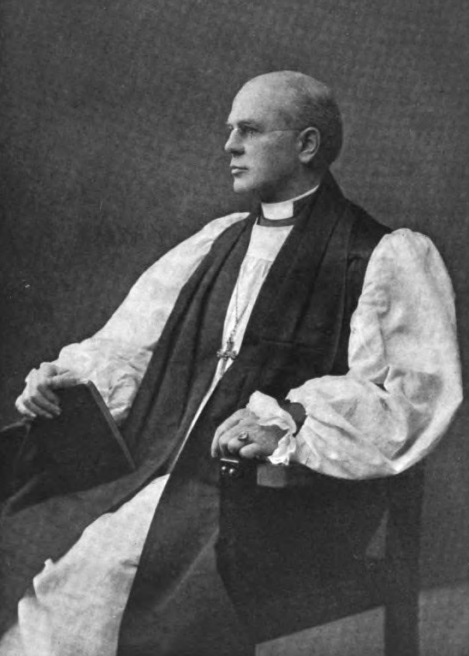
- Church: Roman Catholic prev. Episcopal Church
- Diocese: Delaware
- Elected: June 3, 1908
- In office: 1908–1919
- Predecessor: Leighton Coleman
- Successor: Philip Cook

Orders
- Ordination: July 1, 1896 by William Woodruff Niles
- Consecration: October 28, 1908 by Daniel Sylvester Tuttle
- Laicized: October 27, 1920

Personal details
- Born: September 27, 1868 Warren, Ohio, United States
- Died: June 18, 1944 (aged 75) Lewiston, Maine, United States
- Parents: Frederick Kinsman Jr. & Mary Louisa Marvin

Frederick Joseph Kinsman (September 27, 1868, Warren, Ohio - June 18, 1944, Lewiston, Maine) was an American Roman Catholic church historian who had formerly been a bishop of the Protestant Episcopal Church. From 1908 to 1919 he was Episcopal Bishop of Delaware.

== Life ==
Kinsman was educated at St. Paul's School, Concord, New Hampshire, and at Keble College, Oxford. He served in the following positions:

- Master of St. Paul's School
- Rector of St. Martin's Church, New Bedford, Massachusetts
- Professor of Ecclesiastical History, Berkeley Divinity School, Middletown, Connecticut
- Professor of Ecclesiastical History, General Theological Seminary

He was ordained deacon in Trinity Church of Paris by the Bishop of New Hampshire William Woodruff Niles on March 10, 1895, and then ordained priest on July 1, 1896, while serving as master at St Paul's School in Concord, New Hampshire. On June 3, 1908, Kinsman was elected third Episcopal Bishop of Delaware. He received the required two-thirds majority on the first ballot in both the clergy and lay conventions. He was consecrated by Daniel Sylvester Tuttle assisted by Ozi W. Whitaker and William Woodruff Niles.

Kinsman was Episcopal Visitor of the Society of the Atonement, an Episcopalian religious community which later became Roman Catholic. In 1918 he was one of the Protestant Episcopalian delegates at an ecumenical meeting with representatives of the Greek Orthodox Church in New York City.

On May 14, 1919, Kinsman announced his intention to resign as Episcopal Bishop of Delaware the following October. He subsequently became a Roman Catholic. He was appointed professor of modern church history at The Catholic University of America.

Kinsman lived the last eleven years of his life at the Marcotte Nursing Home in Lewiston, Maine, and died there in 1944.

== Works ==
Kinsman was the author of numerous works including:

- Principles of Anglicanism (New York: Longmans, Green, 1910)
- Catholic and Protestant (New York: Longmans, Green, 1913)
- Prayers for the Dead (Milwaukee: Young Churchman, 1915)
- Issues before the Church (New York: Edwin S. Gorham, 1915)
- Outlines of the History of the Church (Milwaukee: Morehouse, 1916)
- Salve Mater (New York: Longmans, Green, 1920)
- Trent: Four Lectures on Practical Aspects of the Council of Trent (New York: Longmans, Green, 1921)
- Americanism and Catholicism (New York: Longmans, Green, 1924)
- "St Cyprian", Sign Magazine 5 (January 1926).
- The Failure of Anglicanism (London: Catholic Truth Society, 1929)
- Reveries of A Hermit (New York: Longmans, Green, 1936)
- Book review of Autobiography of Gilbert Keith Chesterton, Catholic Historical Review 23 (April 1937): 94–96.
