= Donald J. Davis =

American Episcopal prelate

The Right Reverend Donald James Davis D.D.
- Bishop of Northwestern Pennsylvania
- Church: Episcopal Church
- Diocese: Northwestern Pennsylvania
- Elected: May 17, 1973
- In office: 1974–1991
- Predecessor: William Crittenden
- Successor: Robert D. Rowley
- Previous post: Coadjutor Bishop of Erie (1973-1974)

Orders
- Ordination: 1955 by Angus Dun
- Consecration: 1973 by John E. Hines

Personal details
- Born: March 12, 1929 New Castle, Pennsylvania, United States
- Died: August 30, 2007 (aged 78) Sarasota, Florida, United States
- Denomination: Anglican (prev. Presbyterian)
- Parents: LcRoy Francis Davis & Rya Anne Stewart
- Spouse: Mary Gray Schofidd
- Children: 3

Donald James Davis (March 12, 1929 – August 30, 2007) was an American prelate who was the sixth Bishop of Erie, and then of Northwestern Pennsylvania after its name was changed.

== Early life and education ==
Davies was born on March 12, 1929, in New Castle, Pennsylvania, the son of LcRoy Francis Davis and Rya Anne Stewart. He grew up in Frederick, Maryland, and was educated at the public schools there. He studied at Westminster College in New Wilmington, Pennsylvania, from where he graduated with a Bachelor of Arts in 1949. He then commenced studies at Princeton Theological Seminary and graduated with a Master of Divinity in 1952. On September 6, 1952, he married Mary Gray Schofidd and together had three children. He was awarded a Master of Arts from Bowling Green State University in 1971 and a Doctor of Divinity in 1975 from Westminster College.

== Ordained ministry ==
Davis was ordained in the Presbyterian Church in 1952 and served churches in Washington, D.C. After joining the Episcopal Church, he was ordained deacon and priest in 1955 by Bishop Angus Dun at Washington National Cathedral. He then became curate of the Church of the Epiphany and Christ Church in Washington, D.C. In 1957 he became rector of St Christopher's Church in Indianapolis, where he remained till 1963. Between 1963 and 1971, he served as rector of Trinity Church in Toledo, Ohio, after which he became rector of Trinity Church in Bloomington, Indiana, in 1971. He also subsequently served as chaplain at Indiana University until 1973.

== Episcopacy ==
Davies was elected Coadjutor Bishop of Erie on May 19, 1973, and was consecrated that same year by Presiding Bishop John E. Hines. He succeeded as diocesan bishop on January 1, 1974. Davis is well remembered for being the bishop to preside over the first canonical ordination of a female priest in the Episcopal Church, when he ordained the Reverend Jacqueline Means on January 1, 1977. he was also instrumental in the Standing Commission on Church Music, which was responsible for the revision of the 1940 church hymnal, which resulted in the Hymnal of 1982. Davis retired on April 1, 1991.

== Allegations of abuse ==
In 2010, Bishop Sean Rowe revealed that as many as 11 women came forward alleging that Bishop Davis had abused them when they were children ages 5-10. At least three of the incidents took place in a swimming pool during summer camp in the 1970's and 1980s. And others victims, in their bedrooms in their home. One of the women abused at the camp was also paid several hundred dollars, according to the Erie Times-News. It was further revealed that allegations were made as far back as 1980, when Bishop Davis was asked to resign from the House of Bishops by then Presiding Bishop Edmond Browning. Bishop Davis was also asked to refrain from performing priestly duties, get pastoral counseling and see a psychiatrist. Reference- sexual assault survivor
