= J. Brooke Mosley =

The Right Reverend John Brooke Mosley D.D., S.T.D.
- Bishop of Delaware
- Mosley in 1953
- Church: Episcopal Church
- Diocese: Delaware
- Elected: June 29, 1953
- In office: 1955–1968
- Predecessor: Arthur R. McKinstry
- Successor: William H. Mead
- Previous post: Coadjutor Bishop of Delaware (1953-1955)

Orders
- Ordination: May 1941 by Henry Hobson
- Consecration: October 28, 1953 by Henry Knox Sherrill

Personal details
- Born: October 18, 1915 Philadelphia, Pennsylvania, United States
- Died: March 4, 1988 (aged 72) New York City, New York, United States
- Denomination: Anglican
- Parents: John Brooke Mosley & Bertha Alice Urwiler
- Spouse: Betty Mary Wall
- Children: 3
- Education: Temple University

John Brooke Mosley Jr. (October 18, 1915 – March 4, 1988) was bishop of the Episcopal Diocese of Delaware, serving as diocesan from 1955 to 1968.

== Early life and education ==
Mosley was born in Philadelphia, Pennsylvania on October 18, 1915. the son of John Brooke Mosley, a chemist (1889-1941), and Bertha Alice Urwiler (1888-1951). He was raised in Willow Grove, Pennsylvania. He graduated high school in 1932 and worked as a salesperson and then as a laborer in a cemetery. He then studied at Temple University, where he also worked at the university library and as a watchman. He graduated with a Bachelor of Arts in 1937. Later, he then also studied at the Episcopal Theological Seminary from where he graduated in 1940 with a Bachelor of Divinity. In 1941 he also studied psychiatry at the Washington School of Psychiatry. He was awarded an honorary Doctor of Divinity from Kenyon College in 1954 and another from Colgate University in 1971, a Doctor of Sacred Theology from Hobart University in 1956 and another from Dickinson College in 1973, and a Doctor of Letters from the Jewish Theological Seminary of America in 1971.

== Ordained ministry ==
Mosley was ordained deacon in June 1940 and became assistant at the Church of St Barnabas in Cincinnati, Ohio. In May 1941 he was ordained priest and a year later he became rector of St Barnabas'. In 1944, he became director of the Department of Social Relations of the Diocese of Washington, while in 1948 he was appointed Dean of St John's Cathedral in Wilmington, Delaware, where he remained till 1953.

== Bishop ==
Mosley was elected Coadjutor Bishop of Delaware on June 29, 1953, during a special convention which took place at Immanuel Church in Wilmington, Delaware. He was consecrated on October 28, 1953, in St John's Cathedral by Presiding Bishop Henry Knox Sherrill, co-consecrated by Henry Hobson of Southern Ohio and Arthur R. McKinstry of Delaware. He succeeded as diocesan bishop on January 1, 1955, and was installed on January 16, 1955. He resigned his see on October 1, 1968. Between 1968 and 1970 he served as deputy of the Executive Council for overseas relations. He then served as president of Union Theological Seminary from 1970 to 1974, where he strove to increase the student body with minority people and women. He was the first president of the seminary to come from a non-Calvinist tradition. He also served for a time as Assistant Bishop of Pennsylvania from 1975 till 1982 and then as chairman of Planned Parenthood in Southeastern Pennsylvania from 1984 to 1987. Mosley was an early, vocal supporter of the civil rights movement in the 1950s and an early critic of the Vietnam War in the 1960s. He died of a heart attack in Pennsylvania Station, New York City while boarding a train for Philadelphia, on March 4, 1988.

== Personal and family life ==
He married Betty Mary Wall at St. Thomas Church, Whitemarsh, Fort Washington, PA, on 6 June 1942.
