= Arthur R. McKinstry =

American bishop

The Right Reverend Arthur R. McKinstry
- Bishop of Delaware
- Church: Episcopal Church
- Diocese: Delaware
- Elected: November 15, 1938
- In office: 1939–1954
- Predecessor: Philip Cook
- Successor: J. Brooke Mosley

Orders
- Ordination: April 25, 1920 by James H. Wise
- Consecration: February 17, 1939 by Henry St. George Tucker

Personal details
- Born: July 26, 1894 Greeley, Kansas, US
- Died: December 25, 1991 (aged 97) Wilmington, Delaware, US
- Denomination: Anglican
- Spouse: Isabelle Van Dorn; Margery Robertson Vannerson
- Children: 5
- Education: Kenyon College; Episcopal Theological School; The University of the South

Arthur Raymond McKinstry (July 26, 1894 – December 25, 1991) was the American bishop of the Episcopal Diocese of Delaware from 1939 to 1954. He was elected November 15, 1938; consecrated February 17, 1939; and retired on December 31, 1954.

== Personal life ==
McKinstry was born in Greeley, Kansas, United States, to Leslie Irwin and Cevilla (Surbeck) McKinstry, He was born with a spinal curvature. He received his elementary schooling in Chanute, Kansas. He later went to Kenyon College where he was a founding member of the Sigma Pi fraternity chapter and served as chapter secretary. He was an organist for the college choir, the pianist for the Glee Club, and the director of the Puff and Powder club. He received two degrees from Kenyon: a Bachelor of Philosophy in 1918 and a Master of Arts in 1920. He also attended Harvard, and received the B.D. and S.T.B. degrees from the Episcopal Theological School at Cambridge, Massachusetts. The University of the South conferred a Doctor of Divinity degree upon him in 1937. He married Isabelle Van Dorn, of Cleveland, in 1920; they had three daughters (Isabelle, Margaret, and Barbara) and two sons (James and Arthur). His wife, Isabelle, would die in 1971 and he would later marry Margery Robinson Vannerson. Margery died in 1988.

== Professional life ==
Rev. McKinstry was ordained a deacon in 1919 and a priest in 1920. His early assignments had him serve as chaplain of Bethany College, at Grace Cathedral in Topeka, Kansas, and at the Church of the Incarnation in Cleveland, Ohio. He was elected deputy to represent the Diocese of Texas at the Episcopal General Conventions in 1931, 1934, and 1937.

Before his election as bishop, McKinstry served as rector in two congregations that brought him into contact with two future presidents of the United States. As rector of St. Paul's Church, Albany, New York from 1927 until 1931, he developed a friendship with Franklin D. Roosevelt. In 1934, as rector of St. Mark's Church in San Antonio, Texas, McKinstry conducted the wedding of Lyndon B. Johnson and Lady Bird Johnson. From 1928 to 1931 he served as the chaplain for the New York State Senate. In 1948 he attended the Lambeth Conference.

== Sources ==
- McKinstry, Arthur R. (1975). All I Have Seen...: The McKinstry Memoirs by the Fifth Bishop of Delaware 1939–1954. Wilmington, Del.: Serendipity Press.
- Clerical Directories from the Archives of the Episcopal Church
