= Robert D. Rowley =

American bishop (1941–2010)

The Right Reverend Robert Deane Rowley
- Bishop of Northwestern Pennsylvania
- Church: Episcopal Church
- Diocese: Northwestern Pennsylvania
- In office: 1991–2006
- Predecessor: Donald J. Davis
- Successor: Sean W. Rowe
- Previous post: Coadjutor Bishop of Northwestern Pennsylvania (1989-1981)

Orders
- Ordination: January 1978 by Edmond L. Browning
- Consecration: May 1989 by Edmond L. Browning

Personal details
- Born: July 6, 1941 Cumberland, Maryland, United States
- Died: January 18, 2010 (aged 68) York, Pennsylvania, United States
- Buried: Arlington National Cemetery
- Denomination: Anglican
- Parents: Robert Deane Rowley Sr. & Alice Marquante Wilson
- Spouse: Nancy Ann Roland
- Children: 2

Robert Deane Rowley Jr. (July 6, 1941 – January 18, 2010) was the seventh bishop of the Episcopal Diocese of Northwestern Pennsylvania.

== Early life and education ==
Rowley was born in Cumberland, Maryland, on July 6, 1941, the son of Robert Deane Rowley Sr. and Alice Marquante Wilson. He was a 1959 graduate of Saint Vincent College Preparatory School in Latrobe, Pennsylvania. He studied at the University of Pittsburgh and graduated with a Bachelor of Arts in 1962 and then a Bachelor of Laws in 1965. In 1963 he was admitted to the Pennsylvania Bar Association, while in 1966 was admitted to the United States Court of Appeals for the Armed Forces. He also graduated with a Master of Laws from George Washington University in 1970. Rowley became a lawyer in the Supreme Court of the United States in 1970 and served in the United States Navy from 1966 till 1974. Between 1974 and 1988 he also served in the United States Navy Reserve. He achieved the rank of captain.

Later he studied at the Seminary of the Southwest from where he graduated with a Master of Divinity in 1977. The same institution awarded him a Doctor of Divinity in 1989. He married Nancy Ann Roland on June 27, 1964, and together had two children.

== Ordained ministry ==
Rowley was ordained deacon in June 1977 and priest in January 1978 by the Bishop of Hawaii Edmond L. Browning in St Andrew's Cathedral, Honolulu, Hawaii. He then served as dean of students at St. Andrew's Priory School in Honolulu, a post he retained till 1980. He was also a canon of St Andrew's Cathedral between 1979 and 1981. In 1981 he became rector of St Timothy's Church in Aiea, Hawaii, and in 1983 became canon to the Bishop of Bethlehem.

== Episcopacy ==
Rowley was elected Coadjutor Bishop of Northwestern Pennsylvania in 1989 and was consecrated in May 1989 by Presiding Bishop Edmond L. Browning. He succeeded as diocesan bishop on April 1, 1991. Between 1993 and 2002, he served on the Presiding Bishop's Council of Advice and was subsequently president of Province III of the Episcopal Church. In 1997 he was nominated for Presiding Bishop. In July 2006 he took a terminal sabbatical leave, which leave expired on August 31, 2007. He died on January 18, 2010, in the hospital of York, Pennsylvania.
