= Grace Church (Utica, New York) =

Historic church in New York, United States

- U.S. National Register of Historic Places
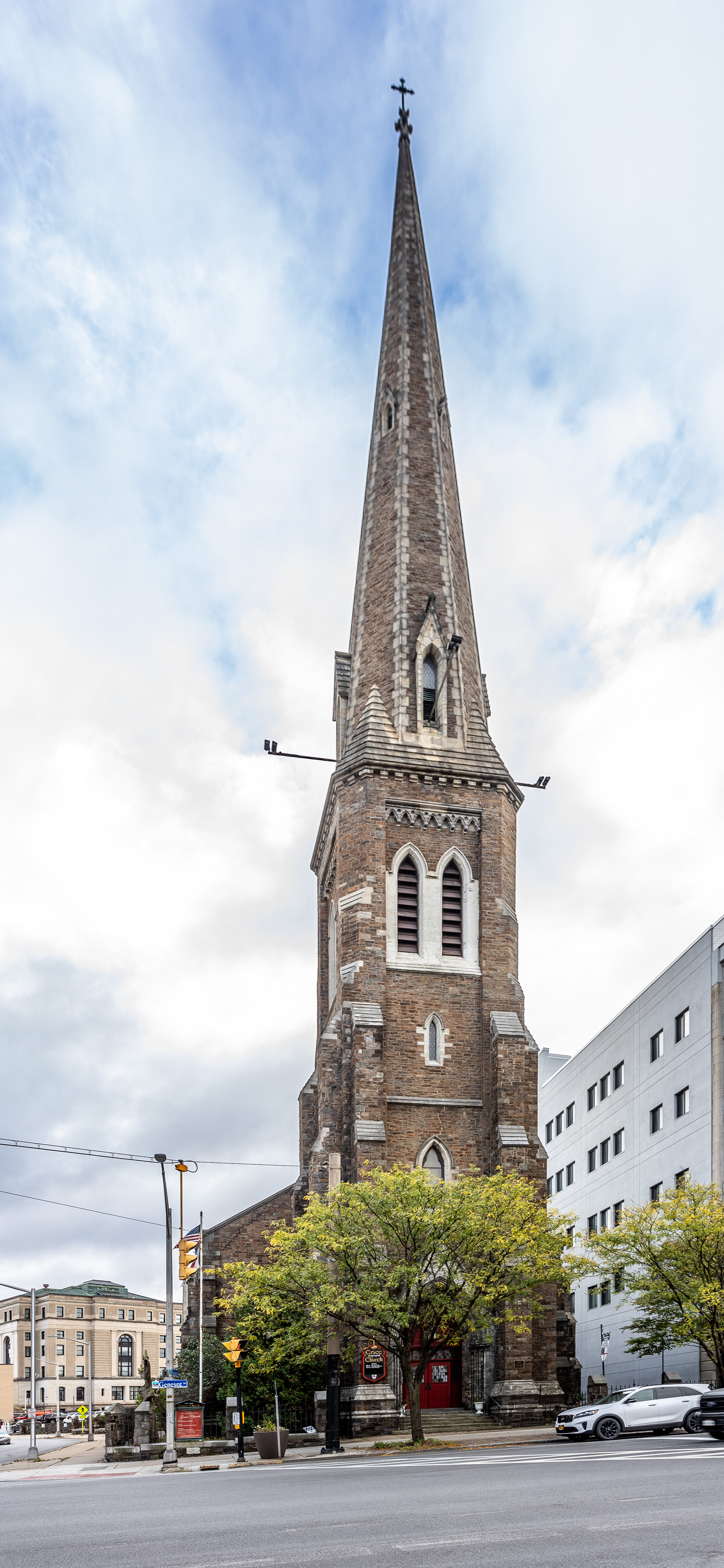

- Location within New York Location within the United States
- Location: Utica, New York
- Coordinates: 43°6′3″N 75°13′53″W
- Built: 1856
- Architect: multiple; Richard Upjohn
- Architectural style: Gothic Revival
- MPS: Historic Churches of the Episcopal Diocese of Central New York MPS
- NRHP reference No.: 97000419
- Added to NRHP: May 23, 1997

Grace Church is an Episcopal church at 193 Genesee Street in Utica, New York, which was established in 1838.

== History ==
The establishing of Grace Church began in the spring of 1838 as an extension of the venerable Mother Parish of the city, Trinity Church. A group of twenty parish members wrote to their then Rector, the Rev. Pierre A. Proal, with the intention of organizing a new parish and requested his canonical consent. The first service was held on May 21, 1838 at 215 Genesee Street, in an upper room of a house located in the parish, and was accordingly organized under the name of Grace Church, Utica. The first church was constructed at the corner of Broadway and Columbia Streets in 1839, and the first service was conducted in the new building in August of that year. For the next 21 years this was the location of Grace Church. Its organist from 1923 to 1932 was Norman Coke-Jephcott.

The cornerstone of the church was set on July 10, 1856. The construction project faced financial difficulties and by September 1859, it seemed as if the church would never be completed. Through the persistence and experience of Rev. John J. Brandegee, the church's third rector, he was able to procure enough funding to complete the construction and pay the mortgage. The first service was held in the new church on May 20, 1860, and by Easter Day, 1864, the $30,000 mortgage was finally paid.

The church had a long history for its mission to outreach to the neighboring community, but dwindling resources and a shrinking congregation brought the painful realization that the few remaining faithful could no longer hold the parish together. The last rector to serve there was the Rev. David Hopkins, who left in July, 1994. In little time, the vestry agreed to merge with Grace Church, and held the final service on November 20, 1994. The following week later on November 27, 1994, the first Sunday of Advent, the people of Calvary Church were welcomed as members of the Grace Church congregation.

It was added to the National Register of Historic Places in 1997.

== See also ==
- Forest Hill Cemetery (Utica, New York)

== Sources ==
- Galpin, William Freeman (1963). Grace Church: One Hundred Twenty-Five Years of Downtown Ministry. Utica, N.Y. OCLC 3473883.
- Storm, G. Wescott. "Grace episcopal Church: A Brief History of Grace Church".
