= Episcopal Diocese of Delaware =

Episcopal Church diocese in the US

Coordinates: 39.752833°N 75.542178°W

Diocese of Delaware Diœcesis Delavariensis

Location
- Country: United States
- Ecclesiastical province: Province III

Statistics
- Congregations: 31 (2024)
- Members: 6,913 (2023)

Information
- Denomination: Episcopal Church
- Established: September 26, 1786
- Language: English, Spanish

Current leadership
- Bishop: Kevin S. Brown

Map
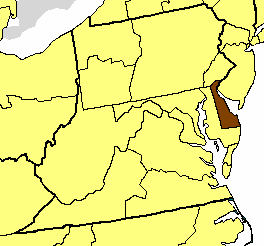
- Location of the Diocese of Delaware

Website
- www.dioceseofdelaware.net

The Episcopal Church in Delaware, formerly known as the Episcopal Diocese of Delaware, is one of 108 dioceses making up the Episcopal Church in the United States of America. It consists of 33 congregations or parishes in an area the same as the State of Delaware. The diocese is led by a bishop and staff and provides episcopal supervision and some administrative assistance for its parishes.

The current bishop, the eleventh Bishop of Delaware, is Kevin Scott Brown, who was consecrated bishop December 9, 2017, and succeeded Wayne P. Wright upon the latter's retirement. The diocesan offices were located for many years at the campus of the Cathedral Church of Saint John, in Wilmington, Delaware. When the cathedral closed in 2012, the offices moved in 2014 to 913 Wilson Road, Wilmington, the site of the former Saint Alban's Church.

The diocese reported 9,544 members in 2016 and 6,913 members in 2023; no membership statistics were reported in 2024 parochial reports. Plate and pledge income for the 31 filing congregations of the diocese in 2024 was $7,501,600. Average Sunday attendance (ASA) was 2,414 persons. This was a relative decrease from ASA of 3,243 persons reported in 2015.

== History ==
The Episcopal Church in Delaware, formerly known as the Episcopal Diocese of Delaware, dates its foundation to 1785, the first time a delegation was sent representing the diocese to the General Convention. Charles Wharton presided over the first state convention on September 26, 1786, at which it was decided to form a wholly separate diocese from that of the Episcopal Diocese of Pennsylvania or the Episcopal Diocese of Maryland, but under the episcopal supervision of the Bishop of Pennsylvania. It is one of the nine original Dioceses of the Episcopal Church in the United States of America.

=== List of bishops ===
Bishops over Delaware
From	Until	Incumbent	Notes
1787	1828	William White, Bishop of Pennsylvania	Resigned Delaware only, retaining Pennsylvania; also Presiding Bishop, 1789 and from 1795.
1828	1841	Henry U. Onderdonk, Provisional Bishop of Delaware	Also coadjutor bishop of Pennsylvania until 1836; also Bishop of Pennsylvania from 1836; resigned Delaware only, retaining Pennsylvania.
Bishops of Delaware
1841	1887	Alfred Lee	Installed October 12, 1841; also Presiding Bishop from 1884; died in office.
1888	1907	Leighton Coleman	Installed October 18, 1888; died in office.
1908	1919	Frederick Joseph Kinsman	Installed October 28, 1908; resigned October 1919 and became a Roman Catholic.
1920	1938	Philip Cook	(July 4, 1875, Kansas City, MO – March 25, 1938, Wilmington, DE); elected May 12 and consecrated October 14, 1920; died in office.
1939	1954	Arthur R. McKinstry	Arthur Raymond McKinstry (1894, Greeley, KS – December 25, 1991, Wilmington, DE); elected November 15, 1938 and consecrated February 17, 1939; retired December 31, 1954.
1955	1968	J. Brooke Mosley	John Brooke Mosley (called Brooke; October 18, 1915, Philadelphia, PA – March 4, 1988, New York, NY); elected coadjutor June 29 and consecrated October 28, 1953; installed as diocesan January 16, 1955; resigned October 1, 1968.
1968	1974	William H. Mead	William Henry Mead (1921 – February 25, 1974); elected June 28, consecrated and installed November 15, 1968; died in office.
1975	1985	William Hawley Clark	William Hawley Clark (May 10, 1919 – March 7, 1997); elected January 24, consecrated May 16 and installed May 18, 1975; retired December 31, 1985.
1986		Quintin E. Primo, Jr., interim bishop	Quintin Ebenezer Primo, Junior (July 1, 1913, Freedom Grove, GA – January 14, 1998, Hockessin, DE); previously suffragan bishop of Chicago; interim bishop only, January 1 – November 8, 1986.
1986	1997	Cabell Tennis	Calvin Cabell Tennis (born October 24, 1932); elected June 14, consecrated November 8 and installed November 9, 1986; retired December 31, 1997; later assistant bishop in Spokane.
1998	2017	Wayne P. Wright	Wayne Parker Wright; elected February 28, consecrated June 20 and installed June 21, 1998.
2017	present	Kevin S. Brown	Kevin S. Brown; elected July 15, consecrated and installed December 9, 2017.

== Congregations ==
=== Kent County ===
Founded	Name	address	town	Rector	status	closed
1703	Christ Church, Dover	South State and Water Street	Dover	Rev. John Tober	Rector	
1704	Christ Church, Milford	200 Church Street	Milford	Rev. Harry Hiltner	Priest-in-Charge	
1889	St. Mary's Episcopal Church (Bridgeville, Delaware)	114 Delaware Avenue	Bridgeville	vacant		
1868	St. Paul’s Episcopal Church, Camden	Old North Road at West St.	Camden	Rev. Blake Wamester	Priest-in-Charge	
1740	St. Peter's Church, Smyrna	22 North Union Street	Smyrna	Rev. Donna Jean Kiessling	Rector	
1868	St. Stephen's Church	190 Raughley Hill Road	Harrington	Rev. John Wright	Priest in charge	

=== New Castle County ===
Founded	Name	address	town	Rector	status	closed
1851	Church of the Ascension	3717 Philadelphia Pike	Claymont		Closed	
1855	Calvary Church, Hillcrest	304 Lore Avenue; Brandywine Hundred	Wilmington		Closed	2024
1855	Cathedral Church of St. John					2012
1848	Christ Church, Christiana Hundred	505 E. Buck Road; Christiana Hundred	Greenville	Rev. Ruth Lawson Beresford	Rector	
1848	Christ Church, Delaware City	222 Clinton Street	Delaware City			2022
1836	Grace Church, Brandywine Hundred	4900 Concord Pike; Brandywine Hundred	Wilmington	Rev. Greg Wilson	Rector	
1884	Immanuel Church, Highlands	2400 West 17th Street	Wilmington	Rev. Wayne Rollins	Priest-in-Charge	
1689	Immanuel Episcopal Church on the Green	2nd and Harmony Streets	New Castle	Rev. Christopher Paul Keene	Rector	
1952	Church of the Nativity	206 Sykes Road, Manor Park	New Castle	closed	2023	
1958	St. Albans Church, Brandywine Hundred	913 Wilson Road; Brandywine Hundred	Wilmington			2013
1829; 1996	Episcopal Church of Sts. Andrew & Matthew	719 Shipley Street	Wilmington	Rev. Patrick Burke	Rector	
1705	St. Anne's Episcopal Church (Middletown, Delaware)	15 E. Green Street	Middletown	Rev. Russ Bohner	Rector	
1890	St. Barnabas Episcopal Church	2800 Duncan Road; Mill Creek Hundred	Wilmington	Rev. Jeanie Martinez-Jantz	Priest-in-Charge	
1954	St. David’s Episcopal Church; Web Site	2320 Grubb Road; Brandywine Hundred	Wilmington	Rev. Michael Kurth	Rector	
1714	St. James Episcopal Church, Mill Creek (Stanton, Delaware)	2106 St. James Church Road; Stanton, Mill Creek Hundred	Wilmington	Rev. Ben Rockwell	Rector	
1855	St. James Church, Newport	2 South Augustine Street; Newport	Wilmington	Rev. Sarah L. J. Nelson	Rector	
1964	St. Nicholas’ Episcopal Church	10 Old Newark Road; White Clay Hundred	Newark	Rev. James M. Bimbi	Priest-in-Charge	
1842	St. Thomas's Parish	276 South College Avenue	Newark	Rev. Dr. Howell C. Sasser, Jr.	Rector	
1830	Trinity Parish	1108 N. Adams Street (at Delaware Avenue)	Wilmington	Open		
1791	Holy Trinity Church (Old Swedes)	606 Church Street	Wilmington	Open		

=== Sussex County ===
Founded	Name	address	town	Rector	status	closed
1886	All Saints' Church, Delmar	Tenth and Grove Streets	Delmar	vacant	closed	
1892	All Saints' Church	18 Olive Avenue	Rehoboth Beach	Rev. Shelley McDade	Rector	
1771	Old Christ Church (Laurel, Delaware)	Broad Creek	Laurel	Rev. Dr. Jack Anderson	Rector	
1794	St. George's Chapel, Lewes	Beaver Dam Road; Indian River Hundred	Angola	Rev. Shelley McDade	Rector	
1728	The Episcopal Church of St. John the Baptist	307 Federal Street	Milton	Rev. Thomas M. White	Rector	
1835	St. Luke's Church	202 North Street	Seaford	vacant	Pastor	
1848	St. Mark's Church	State and Ellis Streets	Millsboro	Rev. Ted Olson	Priest-in-Charge	
1940	St. Martha's Episcopal Church	Maplewood & Pennsylvania Avenue	Bethany Beach	Rev. Victoria Pretti	Rector	
1947	St. Martin's in the Field Church	75 West Church Street	Selbyville	Rev. Glenn A. Duffy	Priest-in-Charge	
1868	St. Paul's Episcopal Church	Pine and Academy Streets	Georgetown	vacant		
1708	St. Peter's Episcopal Church	Second and Market Streets	Lewes	Rev. Jeffrey A. Ross	Rector	
1834	St. Philip's Episcopal Church	600 South Central Avenue	Laurel	Rev. Jack Anderson	Rector	
