= Cathedral of St. Paul (Erie, Pennsylvania) =

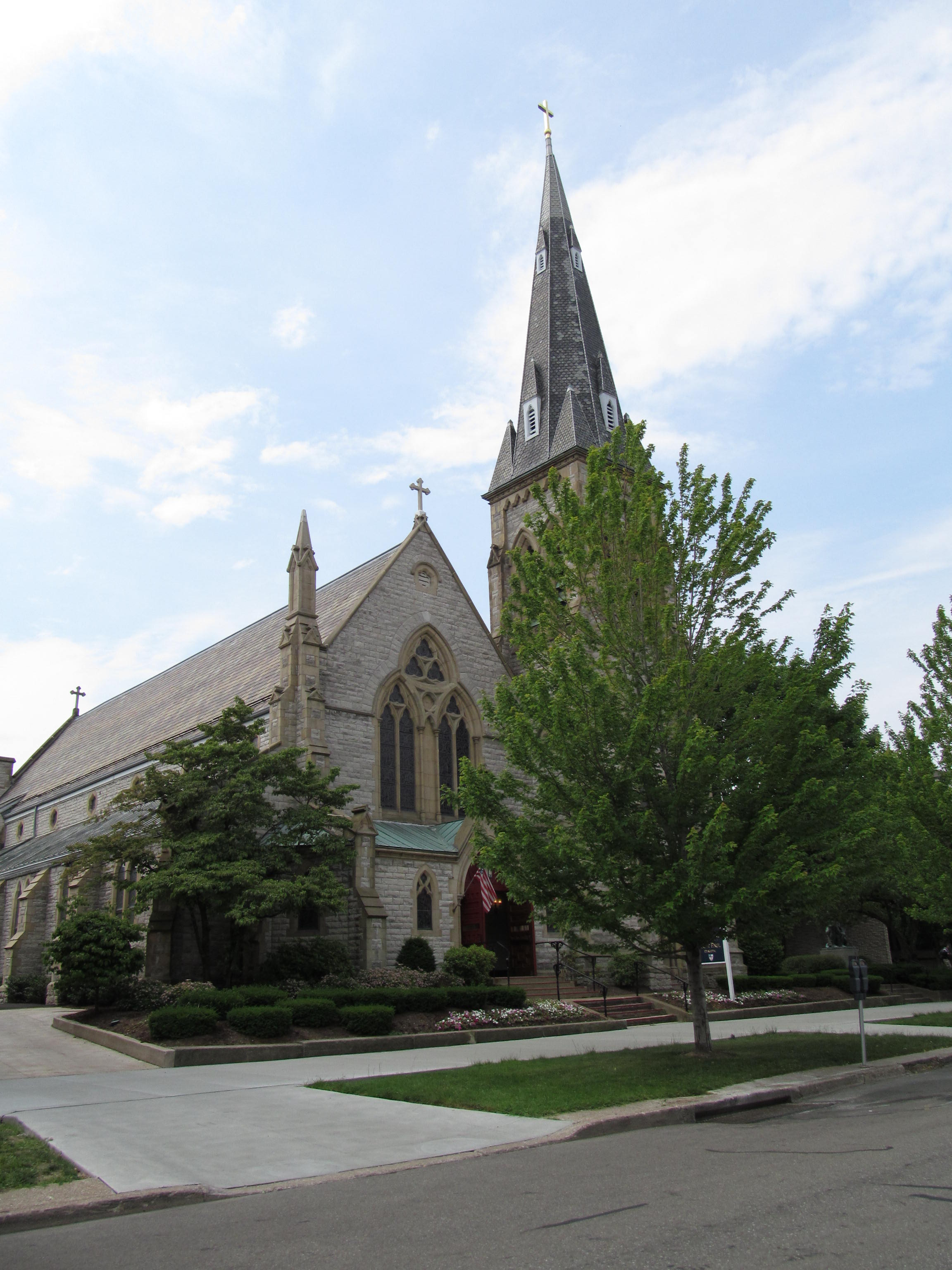

- Location within Pennsylvania
- 42°07′41.15″N 80°05′15.42″W
- Location: 134 W. Seventh St. Erie, Pennsylvania
- Country: United States
- Denomination: Episcopal Church in the United States of America
- Website: www.cathedralofstpaul.org

History
- Founded: March 17, 1827

Architecture
- Style: Gothic Revival

Administration
- Diocese: Diocese of Northwestern Pennsylvania

Clergy
- Dean: The Very Rev. Melinda Hall

The Cathedral of St. Paul is an Episcopal cathedral in Erie, Pennsylvania, United States. It is the seat of the Diocese of Northwestern Pennsylvania. St. Paul's Church was founded on St. Patrick's Day in 1827. The church became the cathedral for the Diocese of Erie on February 21, 1915. The diocese changed its name to Northwestern Pennsylvania in 1981.

Between 2015 and 2025, cathedral membership declined from 486 persons to 170 persons. Average Sunday Attendance (ASA) reported by the church in 2025 was 123 persons.

== See also ==
- List of the Episcopal cathedrals of the United States
- List of cathedrals in the United States
