= St. Anne's Church (Middletown, Delaware) =

Historic church in Delaware, US

- Old St. Anne's Church
- U.S. National Register of Historic Places
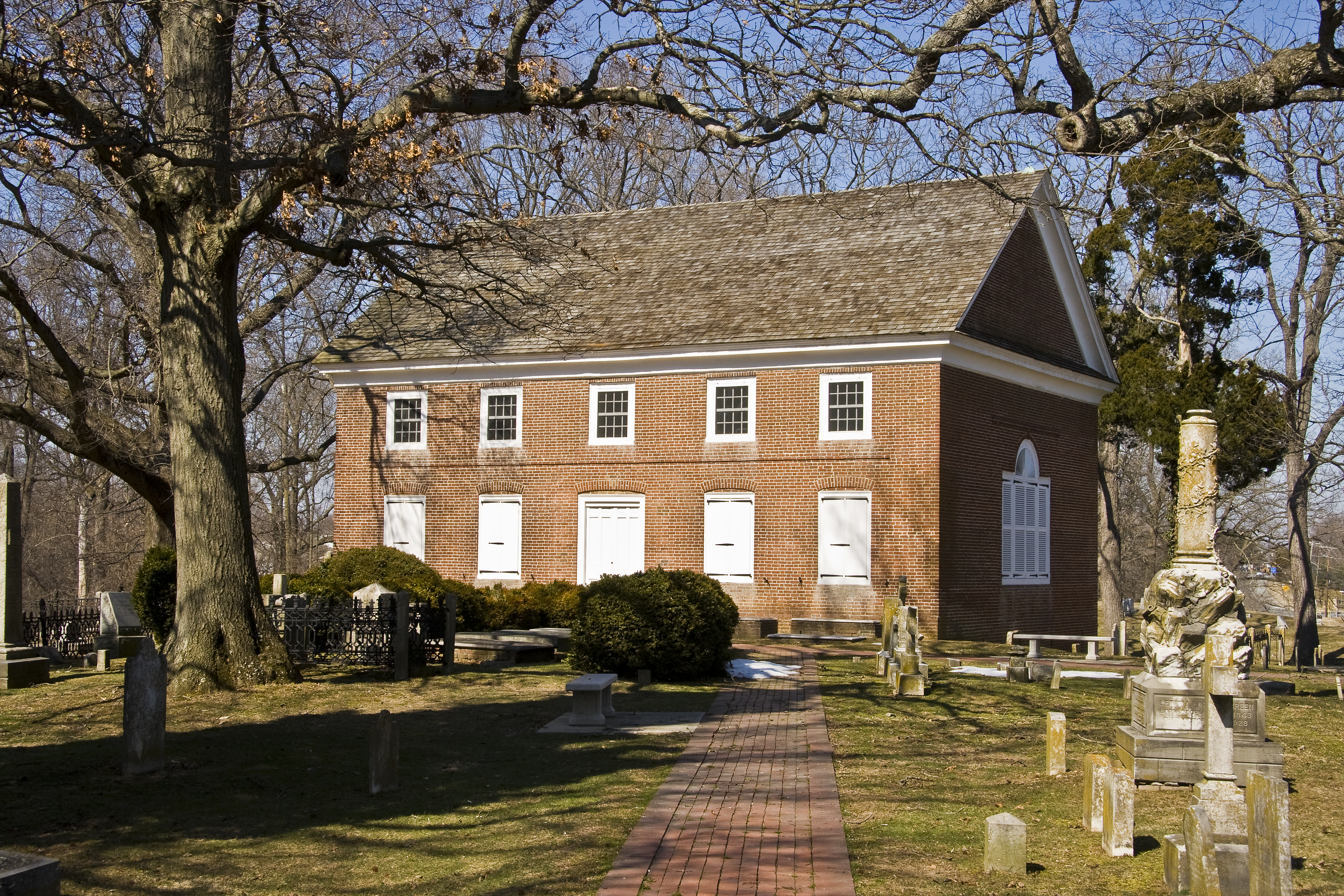
- Front of the church
- Location: 105 St Annes Church Road
- Coordinates: 39.435900°N 75.713110°W
- Area: 5 acres (2.0 ha)
- Built: 1768
- NRHP reference No.: 73000519
- Added to NRHP: March 7, 1973

Saint Anne's Episcopal Church is a historic Episcopal church in Middletown, Delaware, United States. The town church was built in 1888. The old church was built in 1768 on the site of an earlier wooden church built about 1705. Queen Anne presented the church with a "covering for the communion table."

The church is part of the Episcopal Diocese of Delaware. In 2015, the church reported 245 members; in 2023, it reported 332 members. No membership statistics were reported in 2024 national parochial reports. Plate and pledge financial support reported by the church in 2024 was $443,710. Average Sunday Attendance (ASA) reported in 2024 was 151 persons. This was a relative increase from the ASA of 113 reported in 2015.

== Building ==
The church was nominated for inclusion on the National Register of Historic Places on May 2, 1972, and was added to the Register on March 7, 1973.
