= List of Macalester College people =

This is a list of people associated with Macalester College in Saint Paul, Minnesota, including notable alumni and faculty.

== Notable alumni ==
=== Academia ===
- Laurence BonJour – philosopher at the University of Washington
- Karlyn Kohrs Campbell (1958) – rhetorician, activist
- William P. Gerberding (1951) – president emeritus, University of Washington
- David C. Hodge (1970) – president, Miami University
- Patricia Ingraham – professor of Public Administration, Syracuse University
- Michael Jensen – professor emeritus, Harvard Business School
- Jane Larson (1980) – professor of Law at the University of Wisconsin Law School
- Edward Everett Nourse – Congregational theologian
- Alexander Wendt – social constructivist scholar of international relations

=== Art and architecture ===
- Siah Armajani – Iranian-born American sculptor
- Heba Amin – visual artist
- Chank Diesel – typographer and artist
- Cass Gilbert – architect, known for United States Supreme Court building, Woolworth Building, and Minnesota State Capitol
- Duane Hanson (1946) – sculptor, known for his photorealistic human figures
- Judith Lodge (born 1941) – painter, photographer
- Anna Min – photographer
- Yuko Nii (1965) – artist
- Colleen Randall (born 1952) – abstract painter
- Monica Rudquist artist
- Flip Schulke – photographer of Muhammad Ali, Jacques Cousteau, Fidel Castro, John F. Kennedy, and Martin Luther King Jr.

=== Business ===
- Mehmet Abbasoğlu – CEO and board member of Petrol Ofisi Grubu
- Jeremy Allaire – Internet entrepreneur
- Joseph J. Allaire – software engineer and internet entrepreneur
- Ari Emanuel – talent agent, basis for the character Ari Gold on HBO's Entourage
- Omar Al Futtaim – Emirati businessman
- Lois Quam – executive who has worked in the public and the private sectors to expand access to health care
- Fred Swaniker – African entrepreneur and educator, co-founder of African Leadership Academy, named one of TIME magazine's 100 most influential people in 2019
- DeWitt Wallace (non-degreed) – founder, Reader's Digest magazine

=== Arts & entertainment ===
- Roger Awsumb – television show host and radio broadcaster
- Bad Bad Hats – indie rock band with alumni Kerry Alexander and Chris Hoge
- Leo J. Enright – Irish radio broadcaster
- Danai Gurira – actress (The Walking Dead, Black Panther, Avengers: Infinity War, Avengers: Endgame), playwright (Eclipsed)
- Gary Hines – director of Grammy-winning Sounds of Blackness
- Mac King – magician
- Chris Kobin – producer (Hollywood Don't Surf!, Slasher: an IFC Original), writer (2001 Maniacs)
- John Koenig (2006) – creator of The Dictionary of Obscure Sorrows
- Gaelynn Lea – winner of NPR's 2016 Tiny Desk Contest
- Carl Lumbly – actor, Men of Honor, Alias
- M.anifest – Ghanaian rapper, singer, songwriter; winner of Best Rapper and Hip Hop Song of the Year at 2017 Ghana Music Awards
- MNDR (real name Amanda Warner) – singer/songwriter
- Bob Mould – musician, member of Hüsker Dü
- Will Sheff – singer and guitarist of indie band Okkervil River
- Steve Tibbetts – guitarist and composer
- Joey Waronker (1993) – drummer, known for his work with Beck, R.E.M. and Walt Mink
- Walt Mink – indie rock band named after Macalester professor
- Chris Wedes (1949) – portrayed the clown J.P. Patches on the Emmy-winning J.P. Patches Show

=== Law ===
- Paul H. Anderson (1965) – Minnesota Supreme Court justice
- Leland Bush – judge of the District Court of Minnesota; attorney
- Michael J. Davis (1969) – U.S. District Court judge
- Gordon Gallagher – U.S. District Court Judge
- B. Todd Jones (1979) – acting director of the Bureau of Alcohol, Tobacco, Firearms and Explosives; U.S. attorney for the District of Minnesota
- Leslie Stein – judge of the New York State Court of Appeals
- Robert W. Warren (1950) – U.S. District Court judge

=== Literature and journalism ===
- Gary Arndt (1991) – blogger and travel photographer
- Charles Baxter (1969) – author and National Book Award winner for The Feast of Love
- Jessica Blank – playwright, The Exonerated
- Eric Dregni – author of travel memoirs and books about Minnesota, Norway, Italy, food and popular culture
- Mary Karr – bestselling author, The Liars' Club (attended for one year)
- Jonathan Kauffman – food writer and James Beard Foundation Award winner and nominee
- Wade Keller – Pro Wrestling Torch editor
- Ismail Khalidi – playwright
- Walter Kirn – author of Up in the Air (attended for his freshman year)
- Corina Knoll – sports writer
- Alex Lemon (2000) – poet; writer; creative writing professor at Texas Christian University
- Tim O'Brien (1968) – bestselling author, The Things They Carried and Going After Cacciato
- Paul Raushenbush – religious editor of The Huffington Post
- Mark Strauss – editor of Bulletin of the Atomic Scientists
- Ursula Vernon – Hugo Award-winning author of Digger
- Dave Zirin – sports editor of The Nation magazine
- Meggie Royer – poet

=== Politics ===
- Kristen J. Amundson – member of the Virginia General Assembly
- Kobina Annan – Ghana's ambassador to Morocco
- Kofi Annan (1961) – secretary-general of the United Nations (1997–2006), 2001 Nobel Peace Prize winner
- Sharon Sayles Belton (1973) – former mayor of Minneapolis, Minnesota (1994–2001); attorney
- Bobby Joe Champion – Minnesota House member since 2009
- Teresa Daly – Minnesota state politician
- Matt Entenza – former Minnesota House minority leader
- Juan Figueroa – foundation president and 2010 Connecticut gubernatorial candidate
- Frank Hornstein (1981) – Minnesota House member since 2003
- Carlos Mariani – Minnesota House member since 1991
- Scott McCallum – former governor of Wisconsin (2001–2003)
- Doug McFarland – law professor, Hamline University; Minnesota state politician
- Joan Mondale (1952) – former Second Lady of the United States
- Walter Mondale (1951) – U.S. senator (1964–1976); vice president of the U.S. (1977–1981); 1984 U.S. presidential candidate
- James C. O'Brien (1982) – diplomat and attorney
- Julianne Ortman (1986) – Minnesota Senate member since 2003
- Rebecca Otto (1985) – Minnesota state auditor; former Minnesota House member (2003–2004)
- Olli Rehn – European commissioner for Enterprise and Information Society (2004), Enlargement (2004–2010), and Economic and Financial Affairs (2010–present)
- Christopher O. Ward (1976) – executive director of the Port Authority of New York and New Jersey
- Don I. Wortman (1951) – acting commissioner of the Social Security Administration (1977–1978); federal government executive

=== Religion ===
- Donald M. Hultstrand – bishop of Springfield

=== Science and medicine ===
- Catharine Deaver Lealtad – pediatrician and humanitarian

=== Sports ===
- Liam Bowen – college baseball coach
- Conrad L. Eklund – college football coach
- Ron Groce – professional football player
- Marvin C. Helling – college football coach
- Ralph Micheli – college football coach

== Notable faculty ==
- Yahya Armajani
- David Bressoud – former president of the Mathematical Association of America; Dewitt Wallace Professor of Mathematics
- Diane Glancy
- Duchess Harris
- Hubert Humphrey – U.S. Senator from Minnesota, U.S. Vice President, U.S. presidential candidate
- Marlon James – Jamaican novelist and winner of the 2015 Man Booker Prize
- Hildegard Binder Johnson – geographer
- Alvin King – composer, professor of music
- Kiarina Kordela
- George Latimer – former mayor of St. Paul, 1976–1990
- Harold LeVander – former Minnesota governor
- William G. Moseley – geographer
- Edward Duffield Neill
- Peter Rachleff
- Kristina Curry Rogers
- Raymond R. Rogers
- Brian C. Rosenberg
- Tracy Silverman – electric violin player
- James Spradley
- Emma Törzs – author, known for Ink Blood Sister Scribe
- Karen J. Warren
- Harry Waters Jr. – actor, known for Back to the Future and Angels in America
- Jack Weatherford
- James Wright

== Presidents of Macalester College ==
1. Edward Duffield Neill, 1874–1884
2. Thomas A. McCurdy, 1884–1890
3. David James Burrell, 1890–1891
4. Adam Weir Ringland, 1892–1894
5. James Wallace, 1894–1906
6. Thomas Morey Hodgman, 1907–1917
7. Elmer Allen Bess, 1918–1923
8. John Carey Acheson, 1924–1937
9. Charles Joseph Turck, 1939–1958
10. Harvey Mitchell Rice, 1958–1968
11. Arthur S. Flemming, 1968–1971
12. James A. Robinson, 1971–1975
13. John B. Davis Jr., 1975–1984
14. Robert M. Gavin Jr., 1984–1996
15. Michael S. McPherson, 1996–2003
16. Brian C. Rosenberg, 2003–2019
17. Suzanne Rivera, 2020–present
