= Charles J. Turck =

American educator, lawyer, and academic administrator

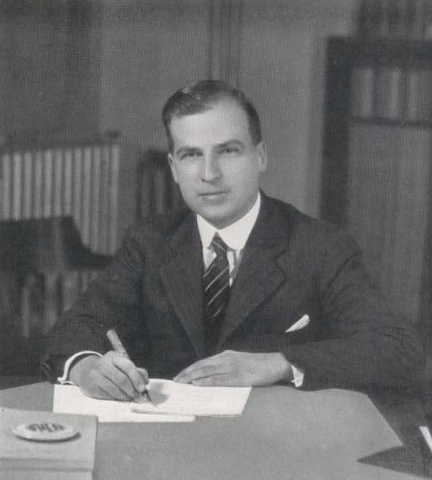
- Turck c. 1931

13th President of Centre College
- In office June 3, 1927 – July 1, 1936
- Preceded by: R. Ames Montgomery
- Succeeded by: Robert L. McLeod

9th President of Macalester College
- In office September 1939 – 1958
- Preceded by: John Carey Acheson
- Succeeded by: Harvey Mitchell Rice

Personal details
- Born: September 13, 1890 New Orleans, Louisiana, U.S.
- Died: January 12, 1989 (aged 98) Arlington, Virginia, U.S.
- Resting place: Bellevue Cemetery
- Spouse(s): Emma Fuller (m. 1914; died 1978) Nancy Head (m. 1983)
- Children: 2
- Education: Tulane University (BA); Columbia University (LLB)
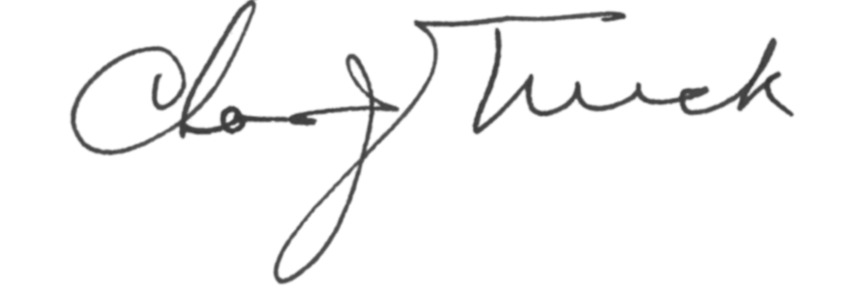
- Signature

Charles Joseph Turck (September 13, 1890 – January 12, 1989) was an American lawyer, educator, and academic administrator who was the president of Centre College from 1927 to 1936, and then of Macalester College from 1939 to 1958. A native of New Orleans, Turck attended Tulane University before graduating from Columbia University with a law degree in 1913. After practicing law in New York City for three years, he taught law at Tulane and Vanderbilt University. He took his first administrative position when he was named dean of the University of Kentucky College of Law in 1924, a job he held for three years until his election to Centre's presidency. He spent nine years leading the school, from June 1927 to July 1936, during which time he continued plans to emphasize academics over athletics and gained the school admission to the Association of American Colleges and Universities. He left Centre for a position in the state tax commission under Governor Happy Chandler and also took an administrative role in the social education department of the Presbyterian Church in the United States of America later that year.

Turck went to Macalester in 1938 to give a lecture; at that time, the school was nearly a year into a presidential search to replace John Carey Acheson. He was offered the job eight months after his talk. He accepted and took office in September 1939, becoming the school's ninth president. There, he worked to distance Macalester from its evangelical roots and emphasize the strengths of its liberal arts curriculum. He led the school through World War II, during which he spoke out against isolationism, which was broadly favored by the student body, and was accused by J. B. Matthews of being a communist spy. Macalester's enrollment saw a drastic increase after the war due to the G.I. Bill, as the school enrolled over six hundred veterans in 1947. He resigned the presidency in 1958 having held it for nineteen years, longer than any other Macalester president to date.

== Early life and education ==
Charles Joseph Turck was born in New Orleans, Louisiana, on September 13, 1890, to Louisa Frank and Charles Edwin Turck. He graduated from Tulane University with a Bachelor of Arts in 1911 and earned two degrees from Columbia University shortly thereafter: a Master's degree in 1912 and a Bachelor of Laws degree in 1913. He practiced law in New York City for the following three years.

== Career ==
=== Professor, dean, and president, 1916–1939 ===
Turck left New York in 1916 to return to New Orleans, where he taught law at Tulane University until 1920, when he took a similar position at Vanderbilt University. In 1924, he became the dean of the University of Kentucky College of Law, and he remained in this position until 1927. In 1925, under his leadership, the UK College of Law became the first such school in Kentucky to be added to the list of approved schools by the American Bar Association.

Turck was unanimously elected president of Centre College by its board of trustees on April 15, 1927, after his nomination to that vote was approved by the search committee, also unanimously. He took office as the school's thirteenth president in 1927. He was its second lay president, after Ormond Beatty, who began his term in 1870. Centre struggled through the Great Depression as faculty were twice forced to take pay cuts, and retention of freshman students reached a low of 30%. Turck's presidency at Centre sought to continue the trend that was started by his predecessor, R. Ames Montgomery, of decreasing emphasis on athletics and prioritizing academics instead. This plan seemed successful as the school kept its place in the Southern Association of Colleges and Secondary Schools and was admitted to the Association of American Colleges and Universities. Additionally, the first study abroad program at Centre began early in his term with a European trip in mid-1928, which was approved by faculty in November 1927.

During Turck's term, Centre completed several projects related to campus improvement. A small renovation to facilities used by Centre's women's department, formerly the Kentucky College for Women, was completed, and renovations and improvements to Old Centre, Breckinridge Hall, and the football stadium were done as well. The changes made to Old Centre, built in 1820 as the college's first building, turned it into Centre's administrative building, though it was also the dining hall until the completion of a dedicated dining-hall building some eleven years later.

Turck resigned Centre's presidency on June 23, 1936, effective July 1, to take a position in Governor Happy Chandler's state tax commission. In October of that year, he joined the Board of Christian Education of the Presbyterian Church in the United States of America (PCUSA) as the director of its Department of Social Education.

In 1938, Turck went to speak at Macalester College in St. Paul, Minnesota, as part of a chapel lecture series; his talk about "Problems of Social Education and Action" was received with far more student interest than was usual for such lectures. At the time, Macalester was nearly a year into its search for a new president, and eight months after the talk Turck was offered the job.

=== Two decades at Macalester, 1939–1958 ===
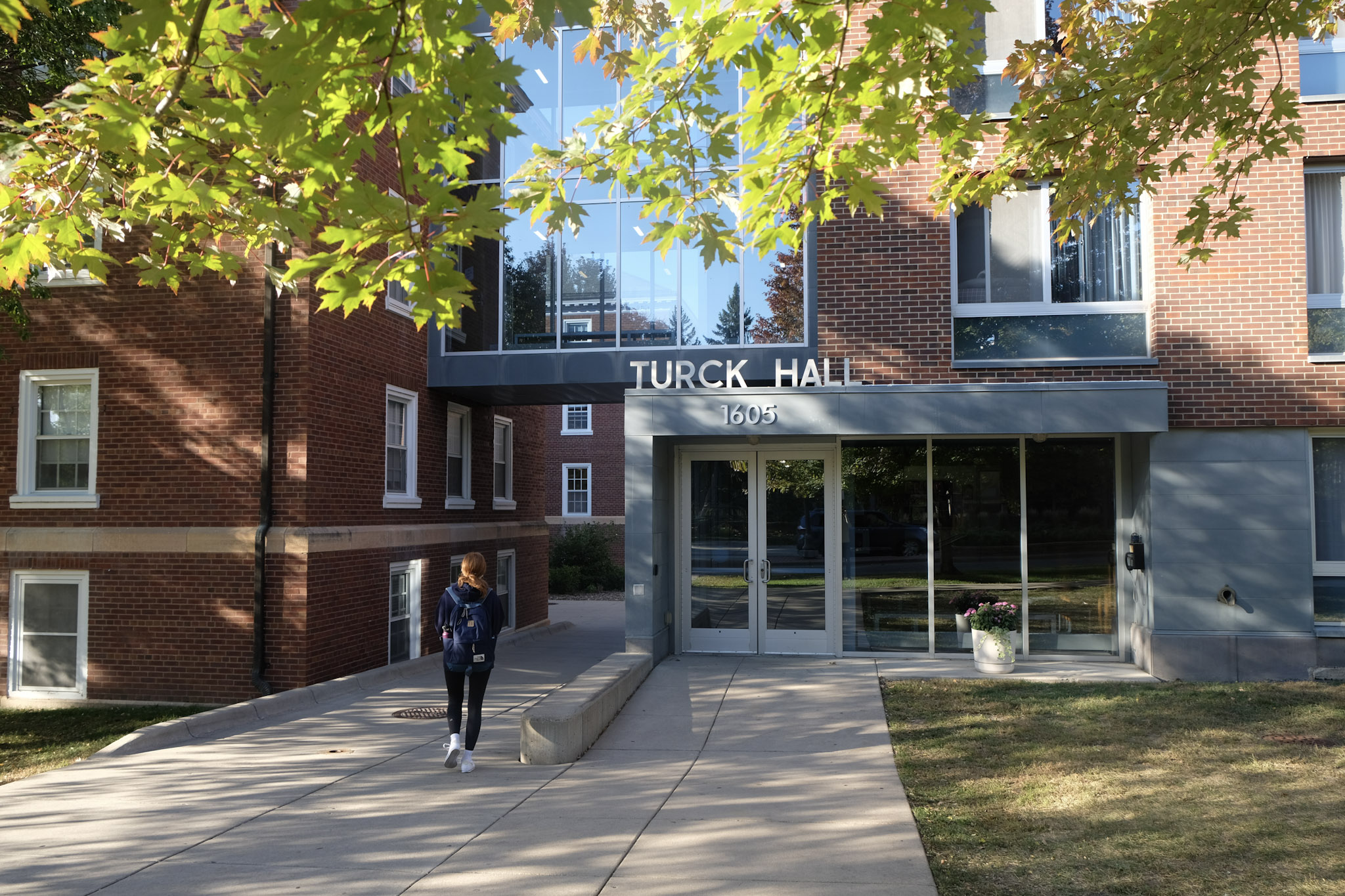
Macalester's Turck Hall, pictured in 2022.

Turck became the ninth president of Macalester College in September 1939, succeeding John Carey Acheson and taking office shortly after the death of president emeritus James Wallace. He was formally inaugurated on May 17, 1940. He desired to make the change to emphasize cultural education at Macalester by taking advantage of, and firmly maintaining, the school's liberal arts status, rather than veering away from it and more towards vocational education as some wished. Additionally, as early as his inaugural address, he expressed interest in moving the school past evangelicalism and its priorities of showing Christianity's superiority and saw religion as a means to an end for the school rather than the goal in and of itself. The differences in Turck's beliefs and those of the school's leaders of the past were summarized by former Macalester faculty member Jeanne Halgren Kilde as revolving around service and its purpose: Turck viewed it as being done for people, albeit with religion as a motivator, while the college's status quo placed it more as purely being done to benefit a deity. The 1940 school catalog reflected this by emphasizing the distinction between the college's religious identity and its former goal of spreading that religion to its students; however, it was the first catalog to explicitly mention Macalester's formal ties to the PCUSA. Macalester experienced a decrease in the proportion of its students who were Presbyterian; in the 1950s that number was typically in the high twenties or low thirties, compared to figures in excess of fifty percent prior to 1920.

Relatively early into his term, during World War II, Turck took a position at the United States Army School of Military Government, hosted by the University of Virginia in Charlottesville, Virginia, and also spent time at the Provost Marshal General's School at Fort Custer Training Center in Battle Creek, Michigan. Macalester also changed as the war continued: in 1942, it introduced new programs with the Army and Air Force that allowed students to study for two years following enlistment, and the school saw male students and faculty leave for military service or government positions. As the issue of fitness, both of those leaving and those still on campus, was brought into the spotlight, Macalester's physical education requirements were strengthened and a women's basketball team was founded. During the conflict, the Macalester student body mostly favored isolationism, and several students wrote a petition to that effect, complete with 180 signatures, with the intention of sending it to Senator Henrik Shipstead. The petition was withdrawn after Turck denied the students permission to send it under the school's name, and shortly thereafter made public his views in opposition of isolationism altogether. The war also delayed his plans regarding the liberal arts curriculum, as the school was forced to return to one that was more vocationally oriented due to the personnel on campus. A moderate Republican, he was considered for the role of staff director of the Civil Rights Commission in the Eisenhower administration but ultimately did not get the job. Around this same time, he was accused by J. B. Matthews to be one of a number of college professors and faculty members around the country acting as communist spies.

In the years following the war, Macalester's enrollment boomed as a direct result of the G.I. Bill; 642 veterans enrolled at the beginning of the 1947–1948 academic year out of the total pool of 1,558 incoming students, also a record. That year also saw twelve new faculty members assigned to departments in the liberal arts, thereby realigning with Turck's plans for the shift in curriculum. But this shift also had negative consequences, as the college was passed up by the Phi Beta Kappa honor society in its bid for a chapter and did not succeed in such a bid until 1968.

During Turck's presidency, he started the school's foreign exchange program, which was a major step in their recruitment of international students. By the end of his term in 1958, the school's enrollment had increased significantly, and by the time of his death enrollment had reached 1,400 with international students representing over ten percent of the total student body. Macalester also began programs that prioritized admissions for African American prospective students, including one that also involved the hiring of an African American admissions counselor and which secured nearly a million dollars in funding from the board of trustees. Overall, Turck held a considerable amount of power during his time as president and his administration was able to hold off influence from DeWitt Wallace, a major donor and the son of former president James Wallace. Turck submitted his resignation as president near the beginning of the 1957–1958 academic year and his successor, Harvey Mitchell Rice, president of the State University College for Teachers at Buffalo, had been named by January 1958. As of 2026, Turck's 19-year term is the longest of any president in Macalester's history.

=== Late career ===
After leaving Macalester, Turck became executive director of the Japan International Christian University Foundation in New York. In his later career, he held several other positions including as a consultant to the M.J. Lewi College of Podiatry, president of the American Association of Colleges and the National Council of Presbyterian Men, and as the director of the Louisville Presbyterian Theological Seminary. He retired in 1970.

== Personal life and death ==
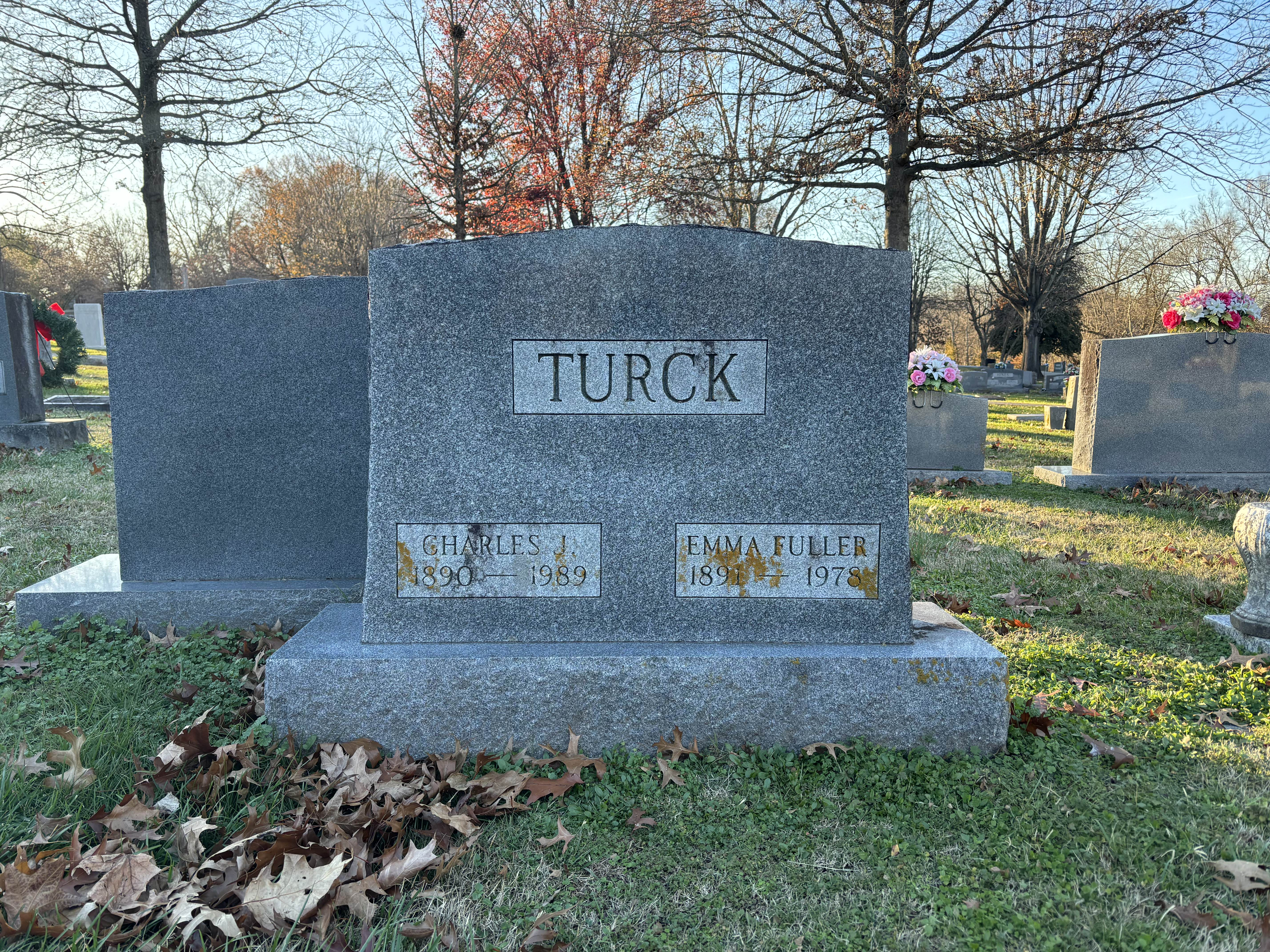
The headstone at Charles and Emma Turck's grave in Danville's Bellevue Cemetery

Turck was a prohibitionist, a Christian, and a Mason. Over the course of his career, he was awarded honorary degrees from Tulane University, Cumberland College, and Kentucky Wesleyan College. Turck's emphasis on internationalism was reflected after his tenure at both of the schools he led, in the Charles J. Turck Scholarship Fund for International Students at Centre and the Charles J. Turck Presidential Honor Scholarship, awarded to international students at Macalester.

Turck married Emma Fuller on September 28, 1914, and the pair were together until Emma's death on December 25, 1978. Both of the couple's children died over the next eight years: Emmy Lou in 1980 and Viola in 1986. Turck married Nancy Head, a member of the church he attended, in 1983.

Turck died on January 12, 1989, at the National Hospital for Orthopaedics and Rehabilitation in Arlington, Virginia, of a heart attack. His funeral was scheduled for January 17, and he was buried in Danville's Bellevue Cemetery.

Academic offices
Preceded by William T. Lafferty	Dean of the University of Kentucky College of Law; 1923 — 1927	Succeeded by Alvin E. Evans
Preceded by R. Ames Montgomery	President of Centre College; 1927 — 1936	Succeeded by Robert L. McLeod
Preceded by John Carey Acheson	President of Macalester College; 1939 — 1958	Succeeded by Harvey Mitchell Rice
