= The Gaze of Orpheus =

In ancient Greek religion, The Gaze of Orpheus is derived from the antiquarian Greek myth of Orpheus and Eurydice. In the story of Orpheus, the poet descends to the underworld to retrieve his wife, Eurydice from premature death, only on Hades’ and Persephone's condition that he does not look at her during the process. During his descent, however, Orpheus disobeys this condition and loses Eurydice again, and he himself is destroyed.

To you this tale refers,
Who seek to lead your mind
Into the upper day;
For he who overcome should turn back his gaze
Towards the Tartarean cave,
Whatever excellence he takes with him
He loses when he looks on those below.

— Boethius, Consolation of Philosophy 3.52

The Gaze of Orpheus has since been evaluated by many philosophers and literary critics. Common analogies are made between Orpheus's gaze and writing processes, philosophical interpretation, and artistic origins. Some of the most famous uses of the gaze of Orpheus can be found in Maurice Blanchot’s short essay ‘Le Regard d’Orphée’ (The Gaze of Orpheus), Geoffrey Sirc's, The Composition's Eye/Orpheus's Gaze/Cobain's Journals, and Jaques Lacan’s work on the mirror stage.

== Interpretations ==
=== Maurice Blanchot ===
Blanchot's interpretation and use of the Orphic myth is to highlight the non-dialectical movement of art, and especially literature's, self-realization. Against Hegelian dialectics, Blanchot's Orpheus sacrifices Eurydice but does not attain the work, only the sacrifice of the work, and affirms the impossibility that grounds the work at its origin. This piece is notable for both its philosophical style and its literary singularity. Some critics have offered “the Orpheus myth as a model which provides ways to discuss many of the features of Blanchot's work, which until now appeared not to have common thematic links." In a way, Blanchot uses the myth to transcribe the creative process—Lynne Huffer suggests that “Eurydice's disappearance symbolizes a loss that is recuperated by the compensatory gift of Orpheus's song.” Blanchot believes that the myth itself is a fitting example of the necessity of obliqueness and indirection in approaching being. Following the thought of Martin Heidegger in his influential essay "The Origin of the Work of Art," Blanchot argues that the work is itself primarily hidden, in concealment, and shrouded by darkness: "the depths do not give themselves up directly," he writes, "but reveal themselves only through dissembling themselves in the work" ("La profondeur ne se livre pas en face, elle ne se révèle qu’en se dissimulant dans l’œuvre").

But Orpheus's impatience leads him to gazes upon Eurydice, and he fails utterly. Crucially, "it is as though what Orpheus yearns to bring back to the light, and which is the reason he cannot not look upon her, is not that Eurydice who will be restored to life and visibility, but ... that the other Eurydice who belongs to the other night and thus will always remain invisible, dying of a death that is without possibility or end. And it is for this other, irreducibly invisible Eurydice that Orpheus squanders both the work and his beloved’s resurrection.” Thus, as Hill argues, Eurydice represents a fundamental absence that fascinates the poet and lures him to the underworld. Orpheus’ backwards glance merely confirms the absence that defines his desire and poetic impulse. In this moment of inspiration, when Orpheus gazes at Eurydice, he loses her—she disappears into the work's inability to attain the fullness of being. The work of art intensifies and accomplishes loss rather than redeems it. Orpheus' glance recursively confirms the absence it sought to resolve. The anguish of loss that compels the artist finds no respite in works that only deepen that absence in the process of creative formation. Blanchot locates an irreducible gap between the fullness of being that poetry seeks and the vacancy of the works that gesture toward, but can never fully capture. Further, Eurydice is always already absent in Orpheus’ poems, even before his descent.

Leslie Hill has criticized the piece by arguing that by making claims on both literature and philosophy all at once, it "fulfils neither of them properly, with the result that, while on one level the story of Orpheus, as Blanchot configures it, indeed reprises and clarifies in theoretical terms many of the underlying arguments and themes common to Blanchot’s work as a whole, it also functions transgressively as a mise-en-abyme of the excessive, paradoxical logic it aims to describe – which is none other than the logic of law and transgression itself – and thereby disables the claim of philosophy or literary theory to be able to rescue literature from the otherness of darkness and bring it into the light.”

=== Geoffrey Sirc ===
Another interpretation or usage of the gaze of Orpheus is by Geoffrey Sirc. Sirc uses Orpheus's moment of violation as argument for creative form in writing versus the standard polished text. Urging the adolescent writer to break free of formal notions of form, Sirc views the journal as the media through which Orpheus yearns for Eurydice. Sirc suggests that if "the Work is freed of concern, the gaze is transgressive, then we’re clearly not talking about the polished text, especially one oriented dutifully around the tiny truths available through an analysis of middle-brow media." Sirc's primary reference to this is in Kurt Cobain's Journal's.

=== Jaques Lacan ===
Lacan's perspective on the gaze of Orpheus is more a matter of desires and yearning. On one hand we have Orpheus gazing towards the underworld, which serves to dissolve the connection between Orpheus and his desire, Eurydice. On the other hand, Orpheus’ role in the upper world is to use his creativity and artistic talent to transform his desires into a recreated form. Lacan uses the topography of the myth to construct his mirror stage. Mark Linder suggests: “The mirror stage is not an isolated event or situation that results in a particular configuration of vision: it is both a loss (of primordial polymorphous, autoerotic wholeness) and an ‘achieved anxiety’ (a precocious anticipation of an impossible maturity or return to wholeness.”

== See also ==
- Orpheus
- Aornum
- Pimpleia
- Leibethra
