= Doppel =

Doppel, German for "double", may refer to:

- Ikarus Doppel, a German two-place, hang glider design
- PRND, the prion protein 2 (dublet), also known as PRND, or Doppel protein

== See also ==
- Doppelgänger
- Doppelganger (disambiguation)
