= Doppelganger (disambiguation) =

A doppelgänger is an apparition or double of a living person in folklore and fiction.

Doppelganger or Doppelgänger may also refer to:

== Books ==
- Doppelganger (Brennan novel), a 2006 fantasy novel by Marie Brennan
- The Doppelganger: Literature's Philosophy, 2010 book by Dimitris Vardoulakis
- Doppelganger, a 2008 novel by Pete Hautman
- Doppelganger, a 2010 novel by Jenny Valentine
- The Doppelganger (Innes novel)
- Doppelganger (Klein book), a 2023 non-fiction book by Naomi Klein
- Doppelganger (Marvel Comics), a character appearing in Marvel Comics

== Film and television ==
- Doppelgänger (1969 film), British science fiction film
- Doppelganger (1993 film), American supernatural thriller film starring Drew Barrymore
- Doppelganger (2003 film), Japanese black comedy film by Kiyoshi Kurosawa
- Doppelgänger (2023 film), 2023 Polish film by Jan Holoubek
- Doppelganger (TV series), Singaporean TV drama
- "Doppelgangers" (How I Met Your Mother), TV series episode
- "Doppelganger" (Arrow), TV series episode
- Doppelgänger, 1979 video made by Elaine Shemilt
- "Doppelganger", episode of The Legend of Zelda
- "Doppelganger, episode of the 1984 cartoon Challenge of the GoBots
- "Doppelgänger", episode of Alias (season 1)
- "Doppelgänger", episode of NCIS (season 2)
- "Doppelganger", episode of Stargate Atlantis (season 4)
- "Doppelgängers", episode of Parks and Recreation (season 6)

== Games ==
- Doppleganger (video game), a 1985 videogame
- Doppelganger (Dungeons & Dragons), a type of creature in Dungeons & Dragons
- Doppelganger (Devil May Cry), a demon appearing in Devil May Cry 3
- Doppelgänger, an enemy of Lara Croft presented in form of her dark alter ego in the Tomb Raider franchise, including Tomb Raider: Underworld

== Music ==
- "Der Doppelgänger", a setting by Franz Schubert of a poem by Heinrich Heine

=== Albums ===
- Doppelgänger (Curve album) (1992)
- Doppelgänger (Daniel Amos album) (1983)
- Doppelganger (Kid Creole and the Coconuts album) (1983)
- Doppelgänger (The Fall of Troy album) (2005)
- Doppelgänger (The Grid album) (2008)

=== Songs ===
- "Doppelgänger" (song), by Creepy Nuts, 2025
- "Doppelgänger", a 2004 song by Efterklang from Tripper
- "Doppelgänger", a 2003 song by Shiina Ringo from Kalk Samen Kuri no Hana
- "Doppelgänger", a 2022 song by Joshua Bassett

== Other ==
- Doppelganger (disinformation campaign), a Russian disinformation campaign
- Look-alike – Person who closely resembles another person, often termed 'doppelgänger'

== See also ==
- "Doppelgangland", an episode of Buffy the Vampire Slayer
