= Kiarina Kordela =

Greek philosopher and critical theorist

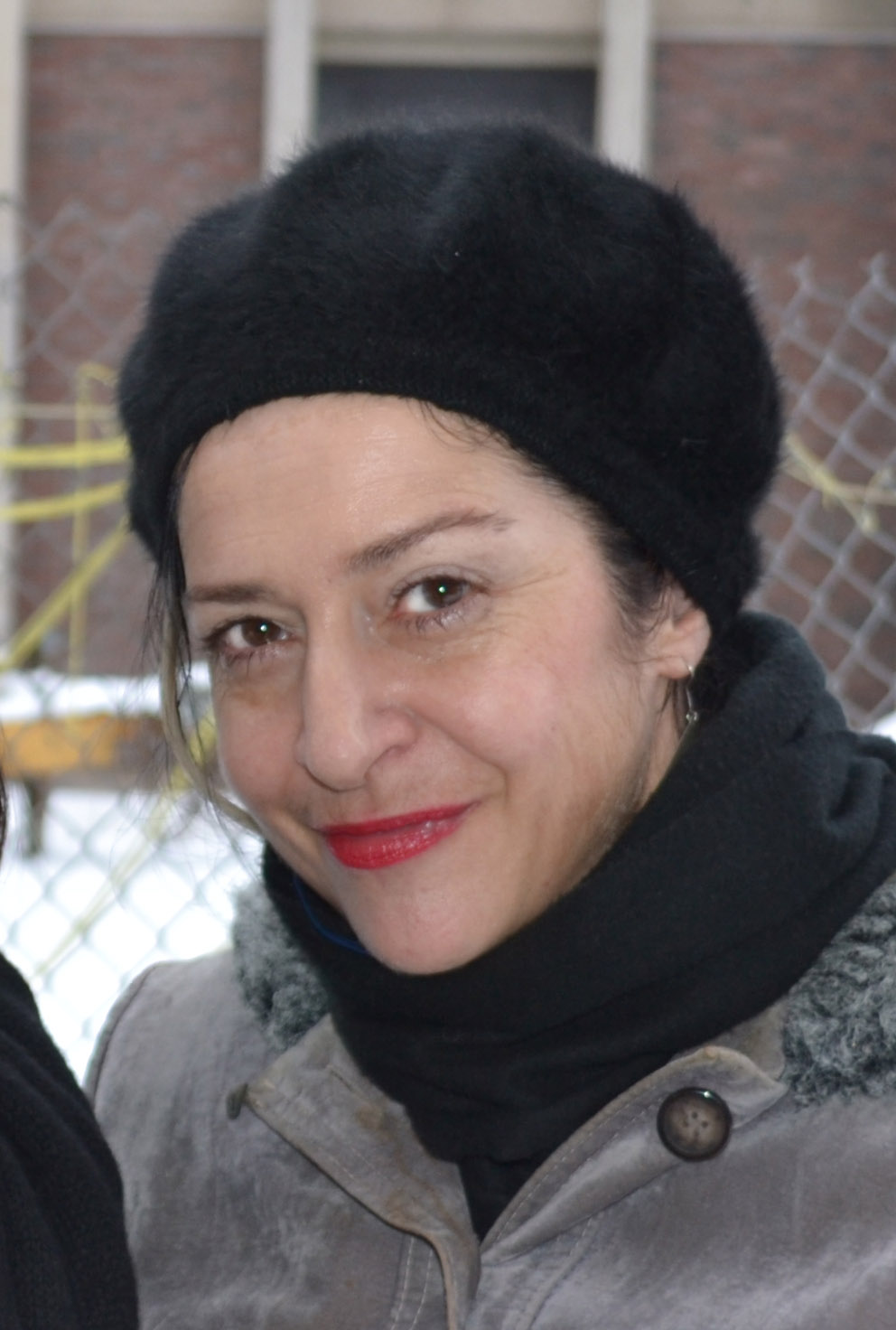
- Kordela in 2013
- Born: July 13, 1963 (age 63); Patras, Greece
- Other names: Aglaia Kiarina Kordela; A. Kiarina Kordela

Education
- Education: University of Athens; University of Pittsburgh; Cornell University

Philosophical work
- Era: 20th-/21st-century philosophy
- Region: Western philosophy
- School: Continental philosophy Critical theory
- Main interests: Psychoanalysis, political philosophy, literary theory, film theory
- Notable works: $urplus: Spinoza, Lacan; Being, Time, Bios: Capitalism and Ontology; Epistemontology in Spinoza-Marx-Freud-Lacan: The (Bio)Power of Structure
- Notable ideas: — political metaphysics — secular folding of transcendence within immanence — historical block — epistemontology — psychoanalytic biopolitics

A. Kiarina Kordela (/kɔːrˈdɛlə/ kor-DEL-ə; born July 13, 1963) is a Greek-American philosopher and critical theorist. She is a professor of German Studies and founding director of the Critical Theory Program at Macalester College in Saint Paul, MN.

== Career ==
From 2010 to 2017 Kordela was an Honorary Adjunct Professor at the Writing and Society Research Center, University of Western Sydney, Australia. Her research combines philosophy, political theory, psychoanalysis, film theory, literary theory and literature, analysis of culture and ideology, intellectual history, and biopolitics.

Her primary approach and focus is on the relation between economic structures and metaphysics in secular capitalist modernity. Kordela offers reinterpretations of Lacanian psychoanalysis and Foucauldian biopolitics using the work of Spinoza and Marx through the lens of psychoanalysis and other critical theory. Her theoretical inquiries are of relevance to a variety of contemporary social issues and academic fields of study, including Postcolonial Studies, Critical Race Theory, Critical Terrorism Studies, Comparative Literature, and Film Studies.

=== $urplus: Spinoza, Lacan (2007) ===
In 2007, Kordela published $urplus: Spinoza, Lacan, wherein she maintains that the work of Psychoanalyst Jacques Lacan continues the thought that runs through Spinoza and Marx. She argues that this line of thought entails a radical reconceptualization of Being or appearance, and further, that this new ontology works "not simply to overturn the Platonic hierarchy but collapses it as obsolete."

Kordela challenges certain interpretations of Spinoza (namely, those of Jonathan Israel, Antonio Negri, Michael Hardt, Gilles Deleuze, Félix Guattari, and other so-called neo-Spinozists, as well as their critics, such as Slavoj Žižek and Alain Badiou), arguing that all neglect the inherent contradictions of Spinoza's work. One of those contradictions, which is central to Kordela analysis of Spinoza and her allegiance to his monism, is his statement that "truth is the standard both of itself and the false." Kordela argues that this ternary concept of truth — truth, itself and the false — reveals Spinoza's break with the binaries of both Platonism and anti-Platonism. Kordela shows that this ternary structure corresponds to Lacan's argument that truth has the structure of a fiction. Kordela traces the emergence of “enjoyment” and “the gaze” out of Spinoza's theories of God, truth, and causality, Kant's critique of pure reason, and, drawing on Kojin Karatani, Marx's pathbreaking application of set theory to economy. The main achievement of $urplus is to move away from the logical impasse of Kant's critique of reason to Lacan's and Marx's theories of surplus by way of set theory.

=== Being, Time, Bios" Capitalism and Ontology (2013) ===
Although both share a focus on human life as it is inscribed by power, Foucauldian biopolitics and Lacanian psychoanalysis have remained isolated from and even opposed to one another. In Being, Time, Bios, A. Kiarina Kordela aims to overcome this divide, formulating a historical ontology that draws from Spinoza, Marx, Heidegger, and Sartre to theorize the changed character of being and time under secular capitalism. With insights from film theory, postcolonial studies, and race theory, Kordela's wide-ranging analysis suggests a radically new understanding of contemporary capitalism, one in which uncertainty, sacrifice, immortality, and the gaze are central.

Italian translation: Essere, Tempo, Bios: Capitalismo e Ontologia, transl. Andrea Ughetto, preface by Franco Milanesi and Andrea Ughetto, Italy, Verona: Ombre Corte, 2017.

=== Epistemontology in Spinoza-Marx-Freud-Lacan: The (Bio)Power of Structure (2019) ===
In this book, Kordela goes beyond both representationalism (or correlationism) and the attempts to challenge it—such as Heidegger’s “disclosure of being,” Alain Badiou’s return to Platonism, Deleuze’s “expressionism,” speculative materialism (e.g., Quentin Meillassoux), various kinds of object-orientated ontology, etc.—by grounding a parallelism or homology between words and things (indexed by the term epistemontology) on Spinozan monism and its subsequent formulation in Marx’s theory of commodity fetishism (in this context the book engages closely also with Alfred Sohn-Rethel’s work).

This book argues further that secular thought tends towards formalism and structuralism—accurately defined by Deleuze as a mode of thought in which “the sites prevail over whatever occupies them” (2004, 174)—and shows the development of this tendency not only in ontology and epistemology but also in aesthetic theory and in the development of psychoanalytic thought. In this context Kordela also addresses the intriguing relation between structuralism and dialectics. But, Kordela argues, there is always also an excess or surplus to structuralism, and this surplus is what the line of thought Spinoza-Marx-Freud-Lacan refers to with the concepts of immanent causality and singular essence (Spinoza), labor-power (Marx), and libido/enjoyment (Freud/Lacan). This surplus to structure leads to a Spinozan-Marxian-Lacanian revision of the concept of biopower, far beyond Foucault’s reduction of bios to the discursive inscription of the biological body and population.

== Bibliography ==
=== Books ===
- 2019, Epistemontology in Spinoza-Marx-Freud-Lacan: The (Bio)Power of Structure, London: Routledge.
- 2018, Spinoza's Authority, Volume 1: Resistance and Power in Ethics, London: Bloomsbury (co-edited with Dimitris Vardoulakis).
- 2018, Spinoza's Authority, Volume 2: Resistance and Power in Political Treatises, London: Bloomsbury (co-edited with Dimitris Vardoulakis).
- 2013, Being, Time, Bios: Capitalism and Ontology, Albany: SUNY Press.
- 2011, Freedom and Confinement in Modernity: Kafka’s Cages, New York: Palgrave-Macmillan (with Dimitris Vardoulakis).
- 2007, $urplus: Spinoza, Lacan, Albany: SUNY Press.

=== Edited books ===
- Spinoza's Authority, Volume 1: Resistance and Power in Ethics, London: Bloomsbury, 2018.
- Spinoza's Authority, Volume 2: Resistance and Power in Political Treatises, London: Bloomsbury, 2018.
- Freedom and Confinement in Modernity: Kafka's Cages, New York: Palgrave-Macmillan, 2011.
