= Verina Morton Jones =

American physician

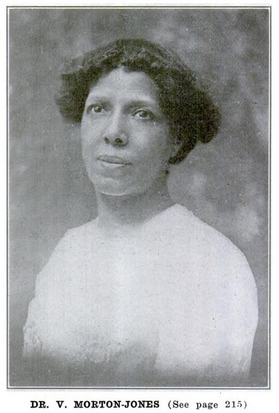
- Born: January 28, 1865; Cleveland, Ohio, USA
- Died: February 8, 1943 (aged 78); Brooklyn, New York, USA
- Education: Woman's Medical College of Pennsylvania
- Known for: Early African American physician
- Scientific career
- Fields: Allopath

Verina Harris Morton Jones (January 28, 1865 – February 3, 1943) was an American physician, suffragist and clubwoman. Following her graduation from the Woman's Medical College of Pennsylvania in 1888 she was the first woman licensed to practice medicine in Mississippi. She then moved to Brooklyn where she co-founded and led the Lincoln Settlement House. Jones was involved with numerous civic and activist organizations and was elected to the board of directors of the National Association for the Advancement of Colored People (NAACP).

== Early life and education ==
Verina Morton Jones was born on January 28, 1865, in Cleveland, Ohio, to Willam D. and Kittie Stanley. From 1884 she attended the Woman's Medical College of Pennsylvania in Philadelphia. She graduated and earned her M.D. in 1888.

== Career ==
Following her graduation, Jones moved to Holly Springs, Mississippi, where she was a resident physician at Rust College and taught classes for the college's industrial school. She was the first woman to pass Mississippi's medical board examination and the first woman to practice medicine in the state.

Jones married physician Walter A. Morton in 1890. They moved to Brooklyn, New York where they set up a medical practice. Jones was the first black woman physician practicing in Long Island's Nassau County. She was active in the Kings County Medical Society and the National Association of Colored Women, directing their Mother's Club in Brooklyn. From 1905 to 1906 she was a member of the Niagara Movement's female auxiliary. She also worked with the Committee for Improving Industrial Conditions of Negroes in New York City. Jones fought for women's suffrage and was president of the Brooklyn Equal Suffrage League. She conducted programs to educate voters, documented racial discrimination at polling places, and testified before investigative committees of Congress.

=== Lincoln Settlement House ===
Jones co-founded Brooklyn's Lincoln Settlement House with Mary White Ovington. Jones supplied the down payment for the house's property at 129 Willoughby Street and from May 1908 headed the organization, which began as an extension of the Henry Street Settlement founded by Lillian Wald. The Lincoln Settlement House offered free kindergarten, a day nursery and a clinic. The settlement house also sponsored debate and choral clubs and offered classes in sewing, carpentry, folk dancing, cooking, and embroidery. Upon its incorporation in 1914, the house moved to a larger building at 105 Fleet Place.

=== Urban League ===
In 1911, Jones, along with Mary White Ovington, was part of a group of five Brooklynites who were active in the Urban League, which was the result of a merger between the Committee for Improving the Industrial Conditions of Negroes, the Committee on Urban Conditions among Negros, and the National League for the Protection of Colored Women.

=== NAACP ===
In 1913, Jones was elected to the board of directors of the National Association for the Advancement of Colored People (NAACP). She served on its executive committee until 1925.

=== Hempstead ===
In the 1920s Jones moved to Hempstead and established a medical practice. She joined other women in the community to organize the Harriet Tubman Community Club in 1928 and from 1933 to 1939 directed the settlement house.

== Personal life ==
Jones was an Episcopalian. Her niece was Catharine Deaver Lealtad. She married Dr. Walter A. Morton in 1890 and gave birth to a son in 1892, Franklin W. Morton, who became an attorney. Walter A. Morton died in 1895. In 1901, Jones married Emory Jones (d. 1927). She died on February 3, 1943, in Brooklyn.
