= Anna Min =

American photographer

Anna Min is an American photographer. Min's work focuses on grassroots groups that otherwise could not afford professional level photography and are often overlooked regarding mainstream publicity.

== Life and work ==
Min is a Korean American born in Minneapolis, Minnesota and raised in Riverside Plaza by their mother. Min attended South High School where they were homecoming queen. They served as secretary of the District 202 board until 2005. They graduated from Macalester College in 2009 with a degree in economics and statistics.

Min has served on the board of directors of Rainbow Health Initiative since 2008. They are a member of the social change fund committee of the Women's Foundation of Minnesota and joined the board of PFund in 2010.

They began taking photos in 2008 because they saw a need for diverse representation in photography and to capture a more broad reflection of the community around them. Min is self-taught.

Min founded Min Enterprises Photography in 2010, and their portfolio includes many large-scale events like Pride, Queertopia, Take Back the Night, marriage amendment rallies, and the National Conference on Creating Change. Min has remarked that approximately 90% of their work is underpaid. Min's work focuses on grassroots groups that otherwise could not afford professional level photography and are often overlooked regarding mainstream publicity. They were invited by Mu Performing Arts to a conversation about the Ordway's production of Miss Saigon and later became involved in a campaign critical of the production. Min documented the Black Lives Matter protest at the Mall of America and created a photo essay that appeared in Gazillion Voices Magazine.

In 2015, Min had their first photography show and print sale at the Cafe Southside.

They also use an aerial drone for video and still photography.
