= Associated Colleges of the Twin Cities =

Private liberal arts college consortium

The Associated Colleges of the Twin Cities (ACTC) is a consortium of private liberal arts colleges in the Twin Cities (Minneapolis–Saint Paul) of Minnesota dedicated to providing cooperative programs, services, and opportunities for their respective students, faculty, staff, and administrators. The ACTC is located in Saint Paul, Minnesota. The five members of the ACTC are:

- Augsburg University
- Hamline University
- Macalester College
- St. Catherine University
- University of St. Thomas

The ACTC was officially incorporated in 1975 in order to share and enrich academic offerings for the students of the five institutions. The consortium continues to promote student exchange between its member campuses and to develop and share academic programs. The opportunity for cross-registration makes possible a range and depth of course offerings and majors unavailable at any single institution.

According to the ACTC's official website, "this partnership combines the benefits of our campuses' small, liberal arts atmospheres with the diverse opportunities of a large university. Students enrolled at one institution are able to experience the strengths and benefits of each school."
