= Meggie Royer =

American poet

Meggie Royer is an American writer and artist.

== Education ==
She earned a degree in Psychology from Macalester College and a Master of Social Work degree from the University of Michigan-Ann Arbor.

== Career ==
Royer is a poet. The Morning After I Killed Myself is a reflective and regretful piece that talks about things that were overlooked and taken for granted prior to committing suicide.

Royer's work has appeared in Rib Cage Chicago Literary Machine, Winter Tangerine Review, and Words Dance Magazine. She was nominated several times for the Pushcart Prize. Her first poetry collection, Survival Songs, was a finalist for the Goodreads Best Poetry Book 2013.

Royer has worked with several associations in combatting violence against women. She uses writing as a means to spread her advocacy.

Royer is the founder and editor-in-chief of Persephone's Daughters, a digital literary and arts journal dedicated for survivors of abuse.

Royer writes about sexual assault, violence, mental illnesses, pain and death, and abortion. Healing and recovery are also common themes.

== Personal life ==
Royer is inspired by how poet Natalie Erbert writes about trauma. Royer is a survivor of domestic violence. Writing helped her confront and cope with trauma.

== Books ==
- Unrequited (2012)
- Survival Songs (2013)
- Healing Old Wounds With New Stitches (2013)
- Degenerates: Voices for Peace (2015)
- The No You Never Listened To (2015)
- Missed Connection (2015)
