= Dimitris Vardoulakis =

Greek philosopher

- Born: 1975 (age 50–51)

Education
- Education: Monash University (PhD)
- Thesis: The Doppelgänger: literary, critical and philosophical reflections (2006)

Philosophical work
- Era: 21st-century philosophy
- Region: Western philosophy
- School: Continental
- Institutions: Western Sydney University
- Main interests: Philosophy and literature Power; Sovereignty

Dimitris Vardoulakis (born 1975) is a Greek philosopher and Associate Professor of philosophy in the School of Humanities and Communication Arts at Western Sydney University. He works in the tradition of Continental philosophy, and has published on a variety of topics, including the relation between literature and philosophy, power and sovereignty.

== Career ==
He received his PhD in philosophy from Monash University and is a winner of Excellence in Leadership Award.

Vardoulakis is the author of The Doppelganger: Literature's Philosophy (2011, Fordham University Press) and Sovereignty and Its Other: Toward the Dejustification of Violence (2013, Fordham University Press). He co-edited After Blanchot: Literature, Criticism, Philosophy (2005, Delaware Press) with Leslie Hill and Brian Nelson and was the sole editor of Spinoza Now (2011, University of Minnesota Press). He co-edited a special issue of SubStance entitled "The Political Animal" with Chris Danta, and a special issue of Angelaki entitled "The Politics of Place" with Andrew Benjamin.

Vardoulakis is the chair of the lecture series Thinking Out Loud: The Sydney Lectures in Philosophy and Society and editor of the linked book series published by Fordham University Press. He is the co-editor of the book series Incitements, published with Edinburgh University Press.

== Bibliography ==
- Vardoulakis, D. (2013), Stasis Before the State: Nine Theses on Agonistic Democracy, New York: Fordham University Press ISBN 9780823277407
- Vardoulakis, D. (2016), Freedom From the Free Will: On Kafka's Laughter, State University of New York Press ISBN 9781438462394
- Vardoulakis, D. (2013), Sovereignty and Its Other: Toward the Dejustification of Violence, New York: Fordham University Press ISBN 9780823251353
- Vardoulakis, D., ed. (2011), Spinoza Now, Minneapolis: University of Minnesota Press
- Vardoulakis, D. (2010), The Doppelganger: Literature's Philosophy, New York: Fordham University Press ISBN 9780823232987
- Hill, L., Nelso, B. and Vardoulakis, D., eds. (2005), After Blanchot: Literature, Criticism, Philosophy, : Delaware Press ISBN 0874139465

== See also ==
- Diego Bubbio
