= Marilyn Gayle Hoff =

American author and activist (born 1942)

- Born: 1942 (age 83–84) Iowa Falls, Iowa, U.S.
- Occupation: Author; songwriter; teacher; activist
- Education: Macalester College (B.A.), Syracuse University (M.A.)
- Notable works: Dink's Blues (1966); Rose (1968); Bring Out Your Own Book: Low Cost Self-Publishing (1980); Free Ride (1991)

Marilyn Gayle Hoff (born 1942), also known as Marilyn Gayle, is an American author, songwriter, professor, teacher, and activist. Her writing includes the novels Dink's Blues, Rose, and Free Ride, as well as the co-authored book Bring Out Your Own Book: Low Cost Self-Publishing.

== Biography ==
Hoff was born in 1942 in Iowa Falls, Iowa. She completed her B.A. from Macalester College in 1964, and an M.A. from Syracuse University in 1968.

=== Career ===
Hoff published her first novel, Dink's Blues, in 1966, and her second novel Rose in 1968, both with Harcourt, Brace & World. In 1967, 1968, and 1969, Hoff received Yaddo artist residency grants. In 1967, 1969, and 1970–1971, she had grants to participate in the artist residency program at the Helene Wurlitzer Foundation. From 1972 through 1978, she wrote and performed songs with feminist and lesbian themes.

Hoff was a professor at Portland State University where she taught classes on women's studies and women's literature from 1973 to 1974. Subsequently she taught for the University of New Mexico in the women's studies department. She was hired as a temporary part-time "instructor in women studies" in 1982.

Hoff co-founded the publishing company Godiva Publishing and produced some of her own books, including the co-authored book What Lesbians Do in 1975 and a collection of her songs titled Dyke Music in 1977 that she also illustrated. Godiva Publishing was an effort with co-author Barbara McFadyen. While promoting their 1980 book, Bring Out Your Own Book: Low Cost Self-Publishing, Hoff led self-publishing workshops at women's studies departments and feminist centers throughout the country. In 1991, Hoff published the novel Free Ride with Firebrand Books.

Hoff currently lives in Taos, New Mexico, as a freelance writer. She often contributes to local papers with her expertise in letters to the editor and editorials.

=== Activism ===
Hoff has been active in social issues, including civil rights, anti-Vietnam war, environmental, peace, and anti-nuclear movements. A major part of her activist work surrounds nuclear power and depleted uranium (DU). She has been an outspoken opponent of the Los Alamos National Laboratory (LANL) in Los Alamos, New Mexico, and the Regional Coalition of LANL Communities. Hoff was involved in state senate and house bills related to DU.

In 2008, she and Jeanne Green created papier-mâché heads of Amy Goodman, Rosa Parks, Winona LaDuke, and Sadako Sasaki for a protest parade in Denver, Colorado, during the Democratic National Convention.

She regularly led programs for Cultural Energy including "LANL Resolution Forum" in January 2018 and "Fracking Jemez" in October 2016.

Hoff has been honored by Love-in-Action Taos in their Fourth of July parade float, called "Unsung heroes procession: activists, whistleblowers and muckrackers."

== Published works ==
- Dink's Blues (1966), Harcourt, Brace & World
- Rose (1968), Harcourt, Brace & World
- What Lesbians Do (1975), as Marilyn Gayle, co-authored with Barbary Katherine, Godiva Publishing
- Dyke Music (1977), Godiva Publishing
- Bring out your own book: low cost self-publishing (1980), co-authored by Barbara McFadyen, Godiva Publishing
- Free Ride (1991), as Marilyn Gayle, Firebrand Books, ISBN 978-1-56341-003-1
