= Sovereignty and Its Other =

2013 book by Dimitris Vardoulakis

- Author: Dimitris Vardoulakis
- Subject: Political theory
- Published: 2013 (Fordham University Press)
- Pages: 269 pp.
- ISBN: 9780823251360

Sovereignty and Its Other: Toward the Dejustification of Violence is a book-length study of sovereignty and its relation with violence by Dimitris Vardoulakis.
