= R. Ames Montgomery =

American pastor and academic administrator

The Reverend R. Ames Montgomery
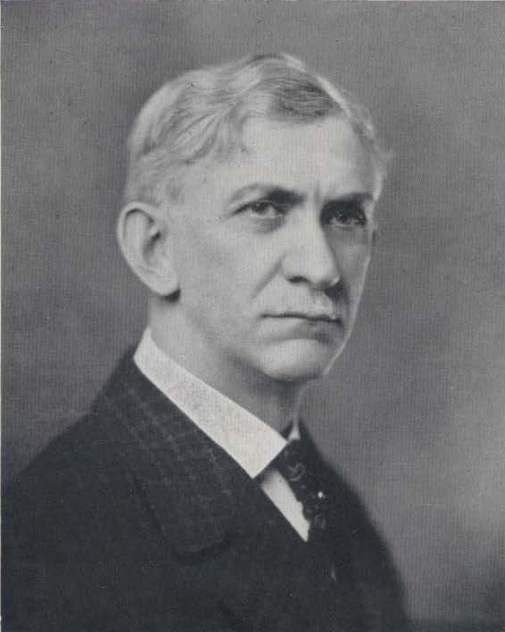
- Montgomery c. 1924

12th President of Centre College
- In office June 1922 – June 1926
- Preceded by: William Arthur Ganfield
- Succeeded by: Charles J. Turck

9th President of Parsons College
- In office August 1917 – June 7, 1922
- Preceded by: Lowell M. McAfee
- Succeeded by: Howard McDonald

Personal details
- Born: July 16, 1870 Hendricks County, Indiana, U.S.
- Died: July 16, 1950 (aged 80) Jonesville, Michigan, U.S.
- Resting place: Spring Grove Cemetery
- Spouse: Mary Allhands (m. 1897; died 1940)
- Education: Miami University; McCormick Theological Seminary
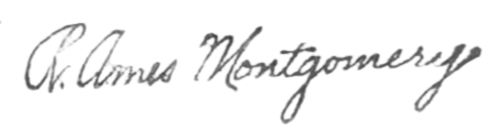
- Signature

Richmond Ames Montgomery (July 16, 1870 – July 16, 1950) was an American pastor and academic administrator. Ordained as a Presbyterian minister in 1896 following his graduation from McCormick Theological Seminary, he held pastorates in Minnesota, Ohio, Iowa, and Missouri, before being elected president of Parsons College, a private liberal arts college in Fairfield, Iowa, in 1917. He spent five years at Parsons before resigning to accept the presidency of Centre College, another private liberal arts school, in Danville, Kentucky. He came to Centre in the midst of major popularity surrounding the school's football team, who had defeated Harvard in a major upset some months prior; this attention caused concern from some that the school was placing undue priority on football at the expense of academics. Montgomery aimed to change this and introduced measures to restore Centre's emphasis on academics, though these changes were unpopular with students, who signed a petition to remove him from office. As a result, he resigned in June 1926. Afterward, he was president of Lane Theological Seminary and held a faculty position at McCormick in his later career.

== Early life and education ==
Richmond Ames Montgomery was born on July 16, 1870, to Caroline Wright and John Martin Montgomery. His brother was W. W. Montgomery, who also went on to become a pastor. Richmond attended Miami University, where he was a member of the Beta Theta Pi fraternity, and graduated in 1893. He then pursued studies at McCormick Theological Seminary in Chicago, graduating in 1896. He was ordained as a Presbyterian minister the same year. Miami awarded him a Doctor of Divinity degree in 1905.

== Career ==
=== Pastorates and Parsons College ===
Montgomery's early career involved pastorates at Presbyterian churches in various places. He was pastor at Glen Avon Church in Duluth, Minnesota, until July 1904, when he left to take a similar position at the First Presbyterian Church in Xenia, Ohio. After, he led the First Presbyterian Church in Ottumwa, Iowa; in June 1909, while the pastor at Ottumwa, he was elected a trustee of Parsons College in Fairfield, Iowa. Later, he became pastor of Tyler Place Presbyterian Church in St. Louis, Missouri, and also held a pastorate in Edgerton, Ohio, during his career. He was elected president of Parsons College on June 5, 1917, filling a vacancy that had existed for a year prior. He gave his farewell sermon at Tyler Place on August 12, 1917.

Early into his term, Parsons received a large gift of $10,000 (equivalent to $251,000 in 2025) from the Fairfield Retail Merchants Association. On October 25, 1917, he gave an address at Iowa Wesleyan College. On July 7, 1922, Montgomery, while on vacation in Montana, submitted his resignation to the Parsons board of trustees by telegram in order to accept the presidency of Centre College in Danville, Kentucky. Howard McDonald, dean of the college during Montgomery's presidency, was chosen to succeed him. In Montgomery's time at Parsons, the student enrollment had expanded from 348 in his first year to 563 in his last; his term was described by a historian of the college as one of "expansion".

=== Presidency of Centre College and later career ===
Montgomery took office at Centre in June 1922, and soon after, the college's endowment surpassed $600,000 (equivalent to $11.54 million in 2025). He was formally inaugurated in a ceremony on June 11, 1923. During his term, he had plans to construct new fraternity houses to increase the number of students living on campus and secured 20% raises for faculty members. At the start of his first academic year, the school added 170 new students, a record at the time. His presidency took place a time when athletics were gaining more attention and priority at Centre; less than a year before he took office, Centre's football team defeated Harvard in a 6–0 upset, earning them significant nationwide attention. A new playing facility on campus, Farris Stadium, was constructed in 1923, though the news was not all good. Around the same time, the school was criticized by the Southern Association of Colleges for purportedly overpaying their head coach, Charley Moran, and was accused of paying professionals to play in place of Centre students. Despite the fact that Moran had been paid far less than head coaches at other southern colleges, he still received far more than members of the faculty. Montgomery prevented the school from being dropped by the Association of Colleges and Secondary Schools of the Southern States, though the accusations were severe enough that Moran resigned the following year and star quarterback Bo McMillin, a popular choice to succeed Moran, declined for financial reasons.

These events all culminated in a decision by Montgomery to begin de-emphasizing football in favor of Centre's academic standards. The faculty supported this change and college teaching practices began shifting to follow trends that were more popular nationwide, including a shift in the upperclassmen's classes from recitations to lectures. Alumni and students, however, were more displeased with the changes. Tensions grew, in particular, between Montgomery and the student body, a large majority of which signed a petition to the board of trustees requesting his removal from office. Ultimately, the students succeeded; he resigned March 9, 1926, effective at the school's commencement exercises in June 1926. He was succeeded by Charles J. Turck, dean of the University of Kentucky College of Law, who took office nearly a year later.

After leaving Centre, Montgomery became president of Lane Theological Seminary in Cincinnati and also spent eight years on the faculty of McCormick Theological Seminary.

== Personal life and death ==
Montgomery married Mary Francis Allhands in 1897; they were married for forty-three years until Mary's death on July 20, 1940. Montgomery died on July 16, 1950—his eightieth birthday—at his home in Jonesville, Michigan, and was buried in Cincinnati's Spring Grove Cemetery.
