= Brian C. Rosenberg =

American academic administrator and scholar

Brian Rosenberg

16th President of Macalester College
- In office August 2003 – May 31, 2020
- Preceded by: Michael S. McPherson
- Succeeded by: Suzanne M. Rivera

Personal details
- Born: Brian Clifford Rosenberg; May 29, 1955 (age 71)
- Spouse: Carol Rosenberg
- Education: Cornell University (BA); Columbia University (MA, PhD)
- Occupation: College administrator

Brian Clifford Rosenberg is an American academic administrator and a scholar on Charles Dickens. As of 2025, he is a visiting professor at the Harvard Graduate School of Education, following his retirement from the position of president of Macalester College. In addition to these positions, he served on the board of trustees of the Dickens Society from 2000 to 2004. In 2014, the Teagle Foundation announced his appointment to their Board of Directors.

A native of New York City, Rosenberg received his B.A. degree from Cornell University and his M.A. and Ph.D. in English from Columbia University. He has published numerous articles on Dickens and other subjects as well as two books: Mary Lee Settle's Beulah Quintet: The Price of Freedom (1991) and Little Dorrit's Shadows: Character and Contradiction in Dickens (1996).

Rosenberg began his academic career as an adjunct assistant professor of humanities at the Cooper Union in New York City in 1982. He worked at Allegheny College in Meadville, Pennsylvania, from 1983 to 1998 as an English professor and as chair of the English Department and participated in the development of the college's strategic plan. From 1998 to 2003, Rosenberg was dean of the faculty and an English professor at Lawrence University in Appleton, Wisconsin. While in this position, he was responsible for all academic programs, athletics, the library, instructional technology and the Lawrence University art gallery. He directed the design and passage of the university's first new general education requirements in 15 years, created the college's first mentoring program for new faculty and wrote the long-range faculty staffing plan.

Rosenberg became the 16th president of Macalester College in August 2003. During his 17-year tenure, Rosenberg faced some criticism from the student body and alumni for his salary, which ranked within the top ten highest in America for a college president. He led a number of fundraising campaigns for the college, such as the Macalester Moment campaign, and oversaw the construction and renovation of several buildings on campus, including the Leonard Center Athletics and Wellness Complex, Markim Hall, and the Janet Wallace Fine Arts Center. He remained politically outspoken during this time, writing articles on the politics involved in higher education and responding freely to current events in newsletters and statements to the student body.

In 2019, Rosenberg announced that he planned to retire from the position of President at the end of the academic year in 2020; he was succeeded in the position by Suzanne Rivera. In fall of 2020, he began working as president-in-residence at the Harvard Graduate School of Education, and later transitioned into the role of visiting professor.

In 2023, Harvard Education Press published his book Whatever It Is, I'm Against It: Resistance to Change in Higher Education, which discusses "the entrenched structures, practices, and cultures that inhibit meaningful postsecondary reform".
