= Suzanne Rivera =

President of Macalester College since 2020

Suzanne M. Rivera
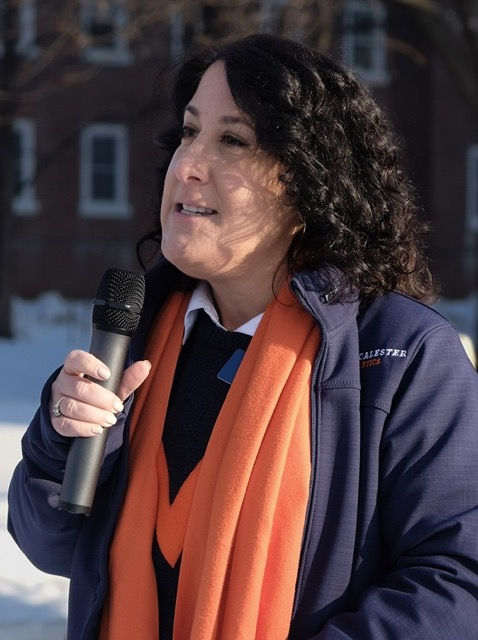
- Rivera in 2023

17th President of Macalester College
- Incumbent
- Assumed office June 1, 2020
- Preceded by: Brian Rosenberg

Personal details
- Born: 1969 (age 56–57) Queens, New York City, U.S.
- Education: Brown University (BA); University of California, Berkeley (MSW); University of Texas at Dallas (PhD)
- Profession: Academic administrator

Academic background
- Thesis: Social Inequality in Biomedical Research (2008)
- Doctoral advisor: Richard K. Scotch

Academic work
- Discipline: Bioethics; public policy
- Institutions: Case Western Reserve University; University of Texas Southwestern Medical Center; University of California, Irvine; Macalester College

Suzanne M. Rivera (born 1969) is an American bioethicist who is the 17th and current president of Macalester College. She is the first female and first Latino/a president in the college's history. Rivera's presidential term began on June 1, 2020. Prior to her tenure at Macalester, Rivera served in academic administration roles at Case Western Reserve University, University of Texas Southwestern Medical Center, and the University of California, Irvine.

== Early life and education ==
Rivera was born in Queens, New York City, in 1969, and raised by a Cuban-immigrant family in the neighborhood of Jackson Heights. She moved to Massachusetts following her parents' divorce, and attended high school at The Cambridge School of Weston. She later attended Brown University as a Pell Grant recipient, from which she received a Bachelor of Arts degree in American studies and was a commencement orator for the class of 1991. Following her undergraduate studies, Rivera earned a Master of Social Welfare degree from the University of California, Berkeley, in 1993. In 2008, Rivera received a Doctor of Philosophy degree in public affairs from the University of Texas at Dallas with her dissertation on health policy, Social Inequality in Biomedical Research.

== Career ==
After receiving her master's degree, Rivera was awarded a Presidential Management Internship, which she used to serve in the U.S. Department of Health and Human Services. She continued to work in the department after her internship before moving to Irvine, California, with her husband, where she picked up a role at the University of California, Irvine, as a research review officer. She eventually became the director of research conduct administration.

From 2005 to 2010, Rivera held administrative appointments at the University of Texas (UT) Southwestern Medical Center in Dallas, Texas. During this time, she pursued a doctorate at the University of Texas at Dallas; she received her Ph.D. in 2008. From 2008 to 2010, Rivera served as an assistant professor in the Department of Clinical Sciences at UT Southwestern. In her additional role as an academic administrator, her final title at the institution was the vice president for research administration. While at UT Southwestern, Rivera co-published with provost and Nobel laureate Alfred G. Gilman.

Rivera moved to Case Western Reserve University (CWRU) in Cleveland, Ohio, in 2010. She served as the associate vice president for research until 2014, at which point she became the vice president for research and technology management. During her time at Case Western Reserve, Rivera served on the faculty as an assistant, and later associate professor, of bioethics and pediatrics. As the research and technology vice president, Rivera oversaw a research enterprise of over $330 million, and was a noted authority on human subjects research at the university. In 2015, Rivera traveled to Cuba to forge connections between American higher education and the country, then under a trade embargo. She later visited the Cuban embassy in Washington, D.C., to meet with Cuban diplomats in the field of education. A case study by Rivera and co-authors on human research in Costa Rica was published in the journal Ethics and Human Research in 2019.

=== Presidency of Macalester College ===
On June 1, 2020, Rivera began serving as the president of Macalester College. An inauguration ceremony (delayed by the COVID-19 pandemic) was held on October 9, 2021; Minnesota Governor Tim Walz proclaimed it "Suzanne M. Rivera Day" in the state. Her presidency succeeds that of Brian Rosenberg, and marks the first time a woman and the first time a Latino (gender inclusive) has served as Macalester's president.

As Macalester's president in 2020, Rivera offered to pay bail costs of Macalester College students arrested during peaceful protests related to George Floyd or the 2020 presidential election. Later in her presidency, in January 2021, Rivera announced a partnership between Macalester and the Posse Foundation to increase the numbers of Black, Indigenous and other students of color at the college.

== Professional service ==
From 2017 to 2023, Rivera sat on the board of Public Responsibility in Medicine and Research. As of 2025, she serves on the boards of directors for the American Association of Colleges and Universities and College Possible, and additionally serves as a board member of other local and national-level organizations. Rivera also remains an involved alumnus of her high school, The Cambridge School of Weston; she attended a college counseling event at the school in 2025.

== Personal life ==
Rivera's husband, Michael Householder, is a scholar of American literature. The two met at Brown University and have two children together. When Rivera was named the president of Macalester in 2020, Householder was an assistant dean at CWRU. Since moving to Saint Paul, he has joined the Macalester Pipe Band and serves as an adjunct instructor.

== Awards and honors ==
- 2020 – Distinguished Educator Designation, National Council of University Research Administrators, one of five to receive the designation that year
- 2019 – Fellow, La Academia de Liderazgo, Hispanic Association of Colleges and Universities, development academy for higher education leaders
- 2018 – Julia Jacobsen Distinguished Service Award, National Council of University Research Administrators, one of four recipients that year
- 2012 – Inclusion and Diversity Achievement Award, Case Western Reserve University
- 2007 – Pi Alpha Alpha, public administration honor society
- 2001 – Alumni Service Award, Brown University

== Selected publications ==
- Brothers, K.B.; Rivera, S.M.; Cadigan, R.J.; Sharp, R.R.; Goldenberg, A.J. (April 2019). "A Belmont Reboot: Building a Normative Foundation for Human Research in the 21st Century". The Journal of Law, Medicine & Ethics. 47 (1): 165–172. doi:10.1177/1073110519840497. PMC 6587582. PMID 30994072.
- Fernandez Lynch, Holly; Bierer, Barbara E.; Cohen, I. Glenn; Rivera, Suzanne M., eds. (2017). Specimen Science. MIT Press. ISBN 978-0-262-03610-8.
- Rivera, S.M.; Brothers, K.B.; Cadigan, J.; Harrell, H.L.; Rothstein, M.A.; Sharp, R.R.; Goldenberg, A.J. (June 2017). "Modernizing Research Regulations Is Not Enough: It's Time to Think outside the Regulatory Box". American Journal of Bioethics. 17 (7): 1–3. doi:10.1080/15265161.2017.1328899. PMC 6089353. PMID 28661748.
- Goldenberg, A.J.; Maschke, K.J.; Joffe, S.; Botkin, J.R.; Rothwell, E.; Murray, T.H.; Anderson, R.; Deming, N.; Rosenthal, B.; Rivera, S.M. (May 2015). "IRB practices and policies regarding the secondary research use of biospecimens". BMC Medical Ethics. 16 (1): 32. doi:10.1186/s12910-015-0020-1. PMC 4426182. PMID 25953109. S2CID 12898467.
- Rothwell, E.; Maschke, K.; Bothkin, J.; Goldenberg, A.; Murray, T.H.; Rivera, S.M. (March 2015). "Biobanking research and human subjects protections: perspectives of IRB Leaders". IRB: Ethics & Human Research. 37 (2): 8–13. PMC 5854323. PMID 26331182.
- Rivera, Suzanne (December 2008). "Clinical Research from Proposal to Implementation: What Every Clinical Investigator Should Know about the Institutional Review Board". J Investig Med. 56 (8): 975–984. doi:10.2310/JIM.0b013e31818e1da9. PMID 18955902. S2CID 17291095.
- Fernandez-Lynch, H.; Bateman-House, A.; Rivera, S.M. (January 2020). "Academic Advocacy: Opportunities to Influence Health and Science Policy under U.S. Lobbying Law". Academic Medicine. 95 (1): 44–51. doi:10.1097/ACM.0000000000003037. PMID 31599758.
- Rivera, Suzanne (2011). McPhaul, M.J.; Toto, R.D. (eds.). Institutional Review Board Approval. Philadelphia: Lippincott Williams & Wilkins. ISBN 978-1605477480.
- Rivera, Suzanne (2014). "Reconsidering Privacy Protections for Human Research". In Cohen, I. Glenn; Holly Fernandez Lynch (eds.). Human Subjects Research Regulation: Perspectives on the Future. Philadelphia: MIT Press. ISBN 9780262526210.
