= Doppleganger (video game) =

1985 video game

- Developer: Alligata
- Publishers: Alligata; Americana
- Designer: David T. Clark
- Platform: Amstrad CPC
- Release: 1985
- Genre: Action-adventure
- Mode: Single-player

Doppleganger is an isometric 3D action-adventure game designed by David T. Clark for the Amstrad CPC and published by Alligata and Americana in 1985.

== Gameplay ==
You control a sorceress and also her alter ego (the doppleganger) in a 25 room castle. Each room has a colour coded door frame which only the sorceress or the doppleganger can pass through. Some doors are locked and need keys. While playing, an hour glass ticks away to indicate there is very limited time to figure out how to top the hourglass back up. Finding the ingots and returning them to the start screen is also challenging, as you will need to switch between the two characters. Some rooms contain moving insects that can hurt and kill you, also there are a batch of red spiders who constantly chase after the sorceress.

== Reception ==
Doppleganger was given mixed reviews, including being rated 51% by Amtix and 63% by Amstrad Action, and given four out of five stars by Home Computing Weekly.
