= The Doppelganger: Literature's Philosophy =

2010 book by Dimitris Vardoulakis

- Author: Dimitris Vardoulakis
- Subject: philosophy of literature
- Published: 2010(Fordham University Press)
- Pages: 336 pp.
- ISBN: 978-0823232987

The Doppelganger: Literature's Philosophy is a 2010 book by Dimitris Vardoulakis in which the author examines the relationship between literature and philosophy.
