= Catharine Deaver Lealtad =

American pediatrician

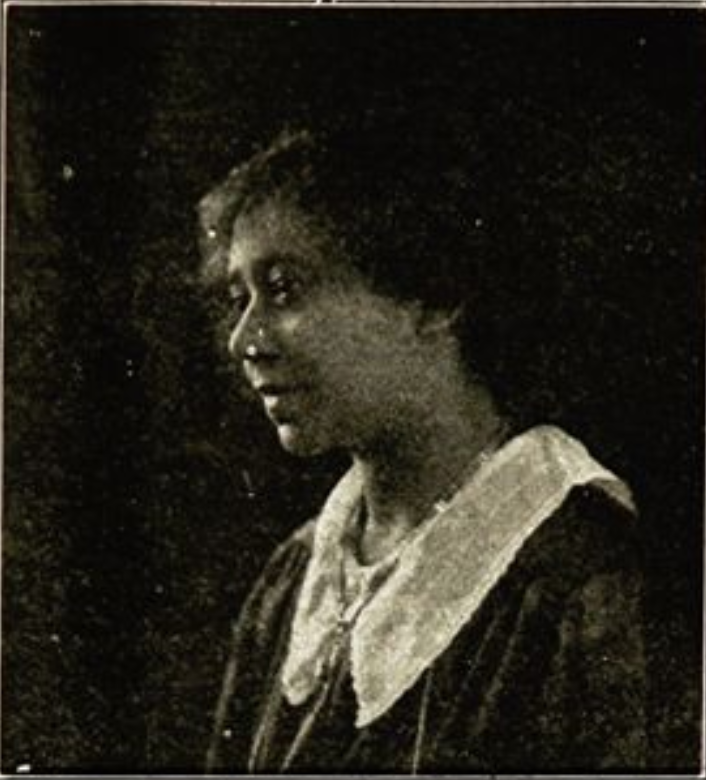
- Lealtad c. 1920
- Born: 26 April 1895; Cleveland, Ohio, US
- Died: 30 January 1989 (aged 93); New York City, US
- Education: Macalester College; University of Paris
- Known for: First African-American graduate of Macalester College; Humanitarian and civil rights work
- Scientific career
- Workplaces: YWCA; United States Public Health Service; Sydenham Hospital
- Thesis: Maladie de Hand-Schüller-Christian. Xanthomatose granio-hypophysaire. Reticulo-endothéliose (1933)

Catharine Deaver Lealtad (April 26, 1895 – January 30, 1989) was an American pediatrician and humanitarian worker. She was the first African-American graduate of Macalester College, where the Lealtad-Suzuki Center for Social Justice is named partly in her honor. Lealtad gained her medical degree at the University of Paris in 1933. She undertook humanitarian and public health work in Germany and China at the end of World War II as a commissioned officer in the US Public Health Service. Lealtad worked as a pediatrician in Sydenham Hospital in Harlem, New York, for many years. After her retirement, she provided medical care in Puerto Rico and Mexico. Macalester College awards the Lealtad Service to Society Award annually in her honor.

== Early life ==
Lealtad was born in Cleveland, Ohio, on April 26, 1895. Her mother, Ida Bradford Deaver Lealtad, had been a schoolteacher in Cleveland. Ida's great grandfather was a free Black man and schoolmaster (John Stewart Stanley) who migrated to Cleveland with his family from North Carolina. Catharine's father, Alfred H. Lealtad, became the rector of St. Philip's Episcopal Church in Saint Paul in 1905. He was the first black rector in Minnesota. Her aunt, Verina Morton Jones, was a physician, social worker, and suffragist, whom Lealtad would call "a moving force" in her life.

== Education and early career ==
Lealtad was the only black pupil in her high school class at the Mechanic Arts High School in St. Paul, and it was the first class to allow girls. In 1912, she graduated at the top of her class at the age of 17, and led the graduation as class valedictorian.

She then attended Macalester College. Lealtad graduated in 1915, majoring in chemistry and history. She was the first African-American graduate of the university.

After graduation, Lealtad taught school in Columbus, Ohio. She also undertook some graduate study at the University of Chicago, and taught at a settlement house in Cincinnati. In 1918, she joined the staff of the YWCA, organizing Black college students. Lealtad resigned in protest at racial discrimination within the organization in 1919. She wrote about this episode in The Crisis the following year, stating that "I think that such a policy of compromise and a policy which caters to the whims and prejudices of southern whites, is anything but Christian and that the public at large should know of the attitudes and policy of this organization." Lealtad then worked briefly as associate secretary for the New York Urban League, before undertaking the role of assistant director of the branches of the civil rights organization, the NAACP, in 1920.

Lealtad became interested in pursuing a career in medicine. She trained as a laboratory technician and worked in a laboratory in New Jersey for three years. With the financial support of a French doctor, Phoebe Du Bois, Lealtad enrolled in medicine at Cornell University. Concerned about the racial prejudice she faced there, she left to study medicine in France on Du Bois' recommendation, spending the first year learning French.

Lealtad ultimately spent six years in Europe, working and studying in Lyon, Paris, and Berlin. She gaining her medical qualification from the University of Paris in 1933, with a thesis on chronic multifocal Langerhans cell histiocytosis, which was called Hand-Schüller disease at the time. She specialized in pediatrics.

== Medical career ==
Lealtad returned to the US, and interned at Provident Hospital in Chicago. There, she began a lifelong friendship with another intern, Helen Octavia Dickens. She also wrote about the conditions for displaced Polish and Jewish children in Europe for the Pittsburgh Courier and Philadelphia Tribune.

She went on to open a private practice in Harlem, serving low-income families with low fees, as well as working in public health services. As the end of World War II approached, she accepted a commission in the US Public Health Service Corps in April 1945, and was posted to Germany to care for children in displaced persons camps.

In 1946, she was transferred to China to provide aid in a cholera epidemic and to victims of the civil war. In a report, which was in part published, she wrote of nightmarish conditions for children in hospital there and criticized politicized use of public funds there. Lealtad was discharged from the Corps in September 1947, with the rank of Surgeon Reserve—the equivalent of a major in the US Army.

When she returned to the US, Lealtad joined the medical staff of Sydenham Hospital, in Harlem. The hospital had been under pressure to employ African-American clinicians since the African-American population in the area had been growing. It is believed to be the first hospital in the US with African-American medical staff, and in 1943 it formally adopted an interracial policy. By the mid-1940s, approximately half the medical staff was Black.

After her retirement in 1968, Lealtad worked at a church mission hospital in Puerto Rico, then volunteered at a free clinic in Mexico.

== Honors ==
- Honor Scholarship Society, Macalester College, 1915.
- Lealtad was the first person granted two honorary degrees by Macalester College: Doctor of Science (1949), Doctor of Humane Letters (1979).
- Lealtad-Suzuki Center for Social Justice, Macalester College, named in her honor of Lealtad and Esther Torii Suzuki.
- Macalester College annual Alumni prize named in her honor: The Catharine Lealtad, Class of 1915, Service to Society Award.

== Personal life ==
When she returned to the US after her service in China, Lealtad bought a home in a Quaker-sponsored multiracial community in Connecticut. She joined the board of directors of the Committee for a Democratic Far Eastern Policy, and of the China Aid Council.

Lealtad spent her last nine years in a Veterans Administration retirement home in Queens, New York. In 1983, she created an endowment to Macalester College for scholarships for African American, Latino, and Native Americans with strong high school records, which are still awarded in her name. She died in New York aged 93, on January 30, 1989. An obituary was published in The New York Times.
