= Leslie Hill =

British academic

Leslie Hill is professor of French at the University of Warwick. He has written several influential books on French writers and philosophers including Samuel Beckett, Marguerite Duras, Maurice Blanchot, Georges Bataille, Pierre Klossowski and Jacques Derrida. Hill was elected to a fellowship of the British Academy in 2003.

== Book publications ==
- Blanchot politique: Sur une réflexion jamais interrompue (Geneva: Éditions Furor, 2020)
- Nancy, Blanchot: A Serious Controversy (London, Rowman & Littlefield, 2018)
- Maurice Blanchot and Fragmentary Writing: A Change of Epoch (London, Continuum, 2012)
- Radical Indecision: Barthes, Blanchot, Derrida, and the Future of Criticism (Notre Dame, University of Notre Dame Press, 2010)
- The Cambridge Introduction to Jacques Derrida (Cambridge, Cambridge University Press, 2007)
- Bataille, Klossowski, Blanchot: Writing at the Limit (Oxford, Oxford University Press, 2001)
- Blanchot: Extreme Contemporary (London, Routledge, 1997)
- Marguerite Duras: Apocalyptic Desires (London, Routledge, 1993)
- Beckett's Fiction: In Different Words (Cambridge, Cambridge University Press, 1990)
