= Macalester College =

Private college in Saint Paul, Minnesota, US

- Motto: Natura et Revelatio cœli gemini (Latin)
- Motto in English: Nature and Revelation are twin sisters of heaven
- Type: Private liberal arts college
- Established: 1874; 152 years ago
- Academic affiliations: NAICU; ACM; COFHE; Minnesota Private College Council; ACTC; Space-grant
- Endowment: $921.6 million (2025)
- President: Suzanne Rivera
- Provost: Lisa Anderson-Levy
- Academic staff: 188 (full-time)
- Undergraduates: 2,068
- Location: Saint Paul, Minnesota, U.S. 44°56′21″N 93°10′4″W
- Campus: Urban (residential), 53 acres (21 ha)
- Colors: Blue and orange
- Nickname: Scots
- Sporting affiliations: NCAA Division III - MIAC; CWPA
- Mascot: Coo the Highland Cow
- Website: macalester.edu
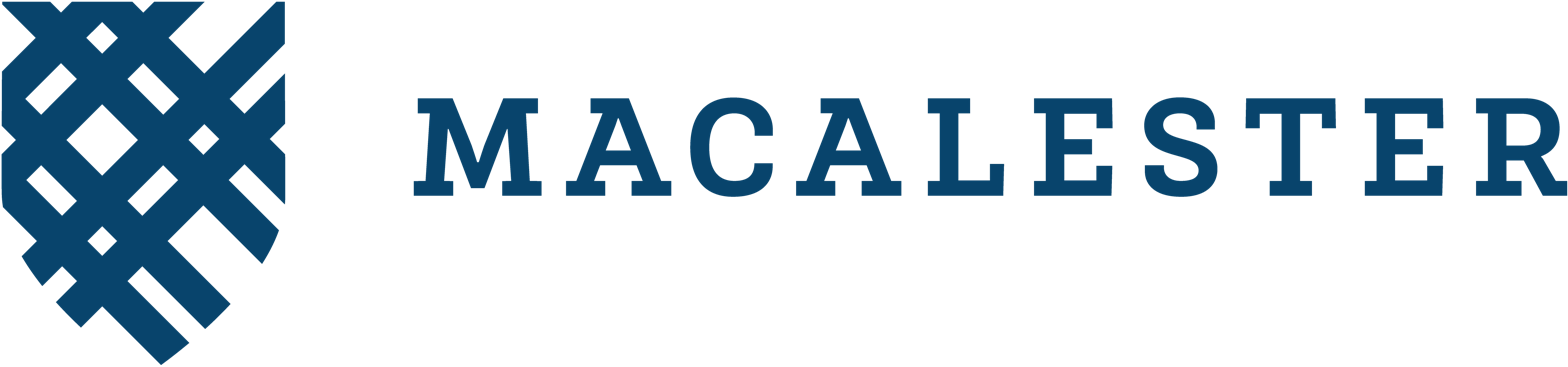

Macalester College (/məˈkælɪstər/ mə-KAL-iss-tər) is a private liberal arts college in Saint Paul, Minnesota, United States. Founded in 1874, Macalester is exclusively an undergraduate institution with an enrollment of 2,068 students in the fall of 2025. The college has Scottish and Presbyterian roots and emphasizes internationalism, multiculturalism, and service to society.

As of 2026, the college offers 38 majors, 40 minors, and 11 concentrations. Students also have the option to design their own major. Macalester's sports teams compete in the NCAA Division III-level Minnesota Intercollegiate Athletic Conference. The college's 60-acre main campus is bordered by Summit Avenue to the north, St. Clair Avenue to the south, and Snelling Avenue to the east. The 300-acre Ordway Field Station, a nature reserve and research station, is on the outskirts of the Twin Cities, along the Mississippi River.

== History ==
Macalester College was founded by Edward Duffield Neill in 1874 with help from the Presbyterian Church in Minnesota. Neill had served as a chaplain in the American Civil War and traveled to Minnesota Territory in 1849. He became connected politically and socially. He went on to found two local churches, was appointed the first Chancellor of the University of Minnesota, and became the state's first superintendent of public education. In leaving the University of Minnesota Board of Regents he desired to build a religious college affiliated with the Presbyterian Church that would also be open to members of other Christian churches.

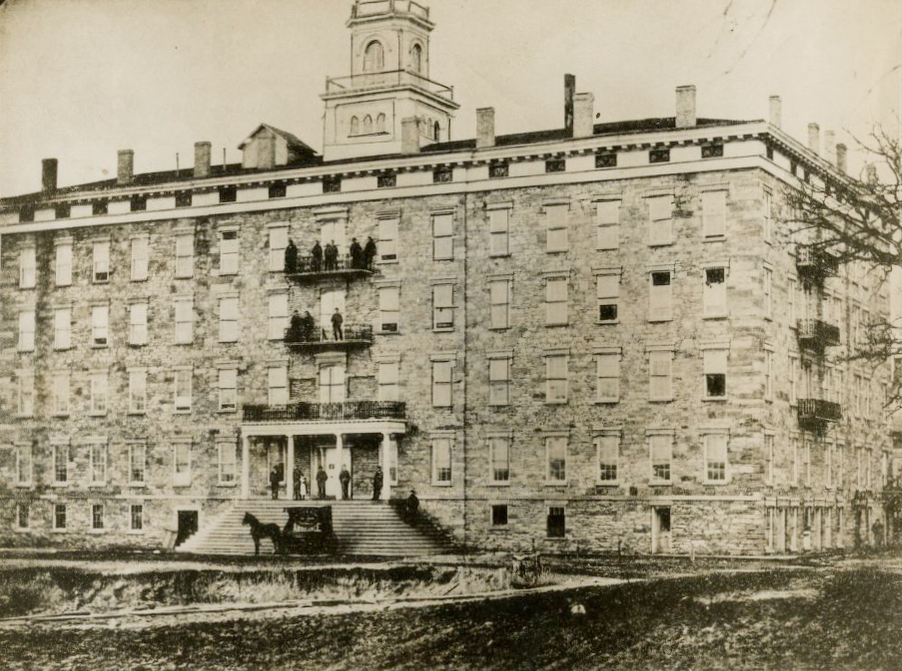
Charles Macalester donated the Winslow House in Minneapolis for use as the school's first building

The college's original name was Baldwin College and it was affiliated with the Baldwin School, a Presbyterian secondary school. After a large donation from Charles Macalester, a prominent businessman and philanthropist from Philadelphia, the institution was renamed Macalester College. Macalester donated a hotel, the Winslow House, as the first permanent classroom building. With additional funding from the Presbyterian Church and its trustees, Macalester College opened for courses in 1885 with five teachers, six freshmen, and 52 preparatory students.

James Wallace joined the faculty in 1887 and later became president. He helped stabilize the college's finances and advance the institution. During his tenure, Macalester created a focus on a liberal arts curriculum. In 1897, Nellie A. Hope was the first woman appointed to the institution's newly organized music department.

During World War II, Japanese American students in concentration camps were invited to study at Macalester.

In 2008, Macalester publicly launched a $150 million capital campaign. In 2009, construction was completed on Markim Hall, a new home for the Institute for Global Citizenship named after Macalester graduate and former U.N. secretary general Kofi Annan. The building qualified for Platinum certification under the Leadership in Energy and Environmental Design (LEED) system, a building rating system devised by the U.S. Green Building Council that evaluates structures' sustainability and environmental impact. In 2012, Macalester opened its renovated and expanded Janet Wallace Fine Arts Center, adding a new concert hall, practice rooms, and expanded facilities for the arts.

In 2020, Suzanne Rivera became the college's 17th president; she is the first woman and first Hispanic person to serve in the role. That year, the college also marked the conclusion of its "Macalester Moment" campaign, which raised more than $126 million in endowed funds, planned gifts, and current-use support.

In 2024, the college announced a new mascot, a Highland Cow named Coo, to replace the Macalester Scot mascot. Students were able to vote on the new mascot.

In September 2025, Macalester announced the Macalester Tuition Promise financial aid initiative. Beginning with students applying to start their studies at Macalester in fall 2026, the college will offer a full-tuition scholarship to all admitted US students with a family income of $100,000 or less (and typical financial assets).

== Campus ==
- Old Main, Macalester College
- U.S. National Register of Historic Places
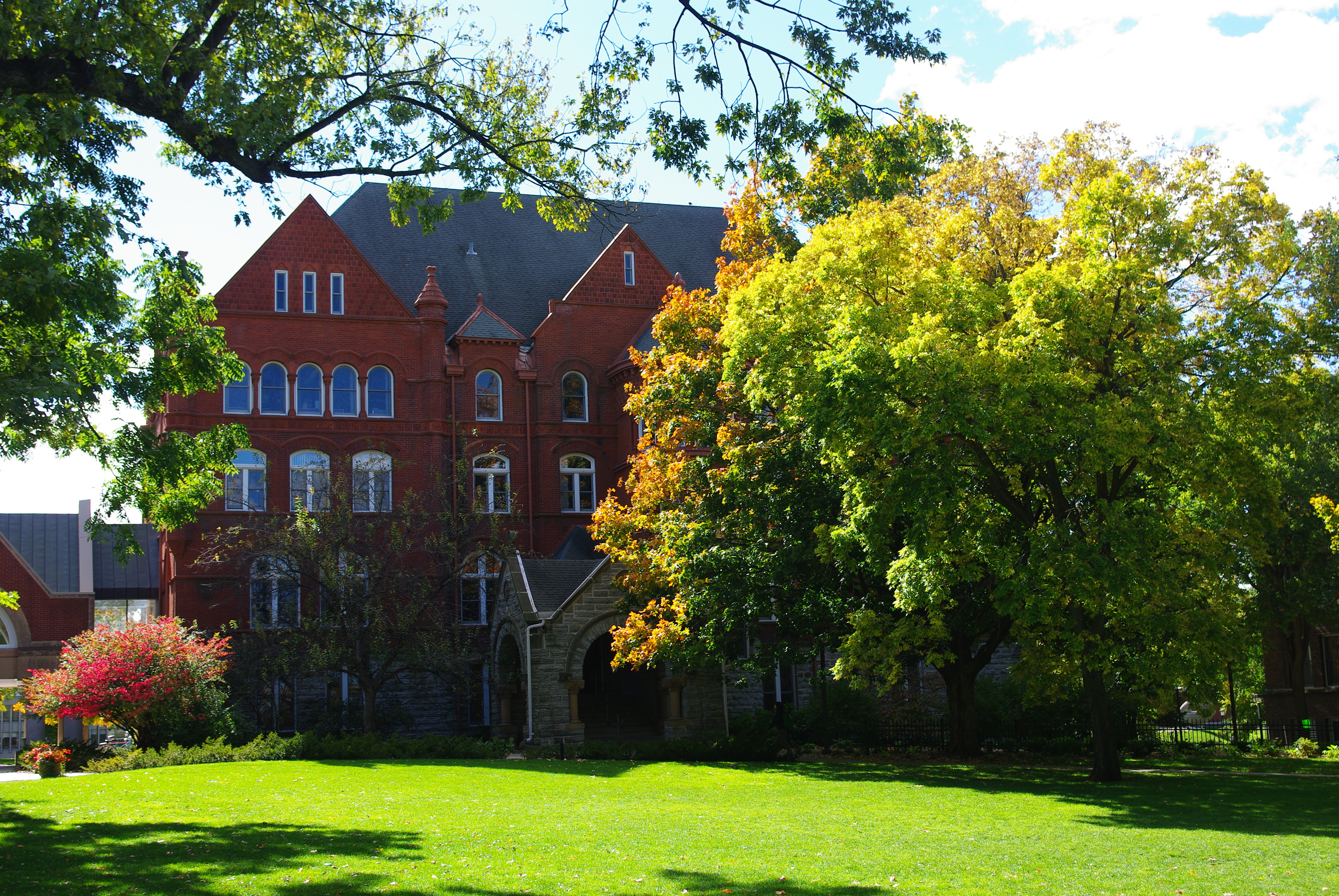
- Old Main
- Location: 1600 Grand Ave. Saint Paul, Minnesota
- Architect: William H. Willcox
- Architectural style: Romanesque Revival
- NRHP reference No.: 77000765
- Added to NRHP: August 16, 1977

=== Sustainability ===
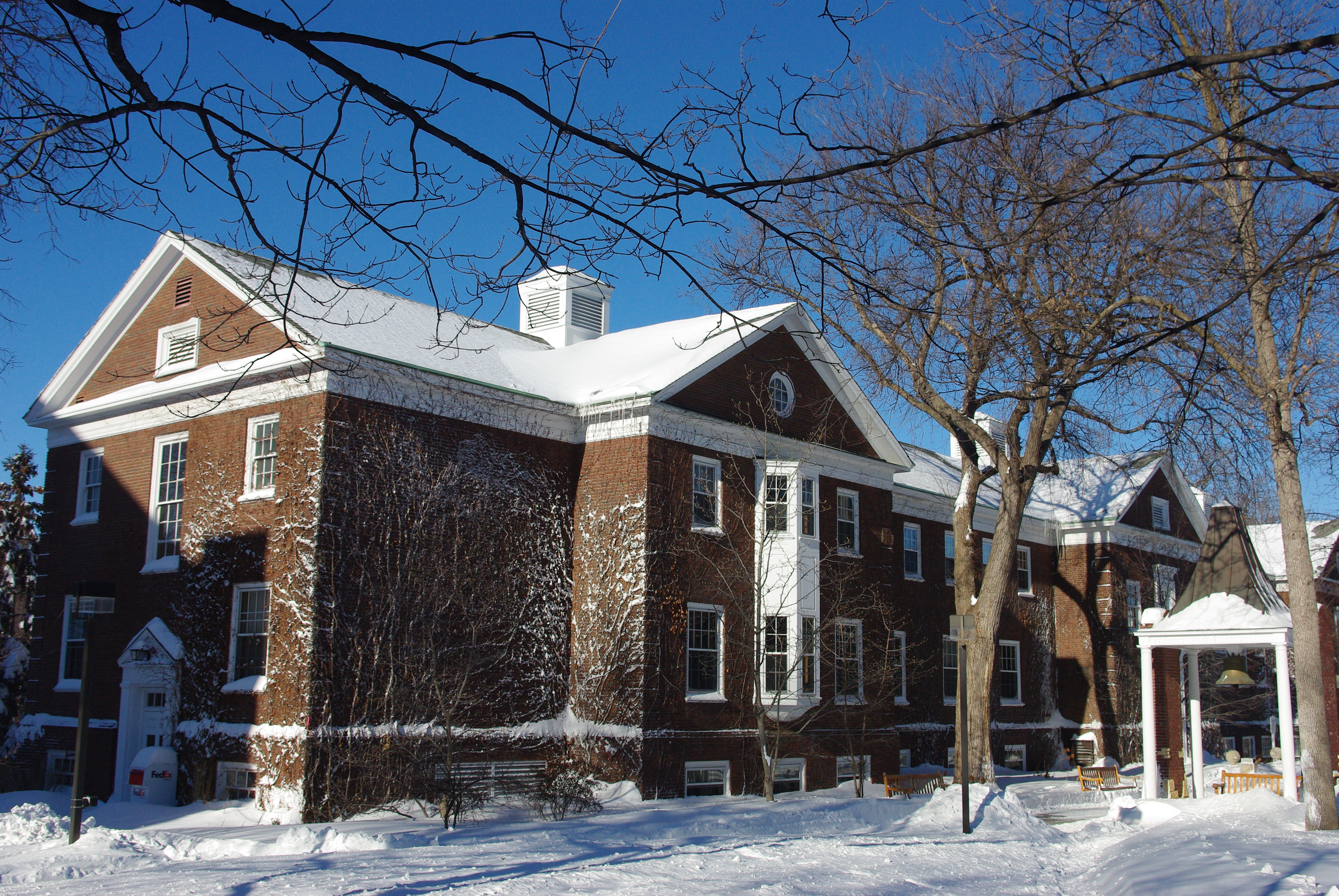
Weyerhaeuser Hall administration building

In the Sustainable Endowments Institute's 2011 College Sustainability Report Card, Macalester received an overall grade of A−, earning it recognition as an "Overall Campus Sustainability Leader". In 2011, the Association for the Advancement of Sustainability in Higher Education (AASHE) awarded Macalester a Sustainability Tracking, Assessment & Rating System (STARS) Silver Rating in recognition of its sustainability achievements. In 2024, Macalester won a Gold STARS rating and was ranked #2 among baccalaureate institutions. In 2026, Macalester was named to the Princeton Review's Guide to Green Schools, ranked 18^{th} of 50.

Many student organizations focus on sustainability, including Macalester Conservation and Renewable Energy Society (MacCARES), Minnesota Public Interest Research Group (MPIRG), Mac Bike, Macalester Urban Land and Community Health (MULCH), Green Athletics at Mac, and Outing Club.

In April 2003, Macalester installed a 10 kW Urban Wind Turbine on campus thanks to that year's senior class gift donating the installation cost and Xcel Energy donating the tower and turbine. Other projects include the Eco-House, a student residence with a range of green features and research opportunities; a rain garden that prevents stormwater from running off into groundwater, a bike share program, and a veggie co-op. The Class of 2008 designated its senior class gift to a Sustainability Fund to support initiatives to improve environmental sustainability on campus and in the greater community. On January 1, 2013, Macalester started campus composting.

In September 2009, Macalester set a goal to become carbon-neutral by 2025 and Zero-Waste by 2020. The school is a signatory to the Talloires Declaration and the American College and University President's Climate Commitment, the latter obligating the college to work toward carbon neutrality. On April 18, 2012, President Brian Rosenberg signed the "Commitment to Sustainable Practices of Higher Education Institutions on the Occasion of the United Nations Conference on Sustainable Development". In 2017, after the Trump administration withdrew the U.S. from the Paris Agreement, Macalester signed the We Are Still In declaration, joining more than 3,800 leaders across different sectors of the U.S. economy.

In 2009, Macalester opened Markim Hall, a LEED Platinum building that houses the school's Institute for Global Citizenship. The building uses 45% less water and 75% less energy than a typical Minnesota building. Macalester is planning to remodel its Music, Theater, and Art buildings and is designing them to Minnesota B3 Guidelines.

Recent sustainability efforts have highlighted the intersection of social justice and climate change at Macalester, as well as the potential conflict between its on-campus sustainability and its investments. Since 2012, students have criticized the college for making significant endowment investments in fossil fuel companies, including direct investments in oil and gas private partnerships. The student organization Fossil Free Mac has led a campaign urging the college to divest from fossil fuel companies. The campaign initially proposed full endowment divestment from the top 200 publicly traded fossil fuel companies, which Macalester's Social Responsibility Committee rejected in 2015. In 2018, the Social Responsibility Committee unanimously approved a revised Fossil Free Mac proposal advocating a moratorium on the college's direct investment partnerships with oil and gas companies, which the board of trustees considered. The divestment campaign had significant support from the student body, student government, faculty, staff, and alumni. In 2021, the Board of Trustees announced its decision to divest of all dedicated, publicly traded oil and gas assets and to adopt a college investment policy that prohibits new investments solely in oil and gas assets.

"Imagine, Macalester", the college's strategic plan approved in 2022, has "Transforming our Physical Environment" as a core pillar, with environmental sustainability as a key aspect of that goal. Recent developments, including the construction of a residence hall powered by geothermal energy and solar panels, are steps toward the college's goal of decarbonization. The project will add Macalester to a growing list of institutions adopting geothermal energy to power their campuses. Macalester plans to expand geothermal power to existing buildings after the new hall is built.

== Academics ==
=== Reputation and rankings ===
Academic rankings

Liberal arts
- U.S. News & World Report: 28
- Washington Monthly: 2

In 2026, Washington Monthly ranked Macalester 2nd on its Top 150 Schools in the Midwest list. U.S. News & World Report ranked Macalester the 25th-best private liberal arts college in the U.S., 9th for "Best Undergraduate Teaching" and 31st for "Best Value" liberal arts college in 2027. Macalester ranked 30th out of 182 colleges in Niche's 2027 "Best Liberal Arts Colleges in America" and 33rd on its "Best Small Colleges in America" list. Overall, Macalester received an A- grade from Niche's system. Money magazine selected Macalester as a "Best College" from a pool of over 2,400 as evaluated by quality of education, affordability, and outcomes. Macalester was named one of the Hidden Ivies based on academics, admissions process, financial aid, and student experience.

=== Admissions ===
Macalester is considered "most selective" by the U.S. News & World Report rankings. For the Class of 2030, Macalester received 10,048 applications and accepted 26% of applicants.

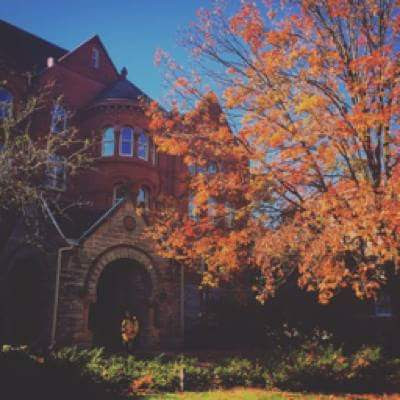
Old Main Building at Macalester College in fall

=== Faculty ===
Macalester has 198 full-time faculty, 91% of whom have a doctorate or the highest degree in their field. Thirty-nine percent of faculty are international or U.S. citizens of color. The student-faculty ratio is 10:1 and the average class size 17.

=== Academic program ===
Macalester offers over 800 courses each academic year, providing pathways to 39 majors, 40 minors, and 11 concentrations. Students may also design their own interdisciplinary majors. Courses are available in the physical sciences, humanities, mathematics and computer sciences, arts, social sciences, foreign languages, classics, several interdisciplinary fields, and pre-professional programs. Pre-professional programs includes pre-law, pre-medical, a cooperative architecture program, and a cooperative engineering program. The most popular majors (in order) are economics, mathematics, biology, psychology, and political science.

The academic calendar at Macalester is divided into a 14-week fall semester (September to December) and a 14-week spring semester (January to May). All courses are offered for semester credit. Most courses are offered for four semester credits, but the amount of credit may vary.

During January, Macalester students may earn up to two semester credits in independent projects, internships, or Macalester-sponsored off-campus courses. They may also earn up to eight semester credits in independent study during the summer through independent projects or internships.

The college's 2024 graduates' most popular majors were:

- Social Sciences (113)
- Biological and Biomedical Sciences (68)
- Computer & Information Sciences (50)
- Multi/Interdisciplinary Studies (45)
- Physical Sciences (39)
- Mathematics and Statistics (39)

=== Study away ===
Studying away at Macalester is managed by the Center for Study Away, and it is called study away (as opposed to study abroad) because there are options to study away domestically. About 60% of Macalester students study away before graduation. Seven departments require off-campus study for completion of a major.

Macalester maintains a list of over 100 approved semester-long study away programs, which is reviewed annually. In addition to meeting the standards of a high-quality liberal arts education, programs are expected to provide opportunities to develop intellectual independence and self-awareness, build cultural understanding and/or language skills, and enhance learning through applied experience and curricular opportunities not available on Macalester's campus. Approved programs include three taught by Macalester faculty, a small group of exchange programs with affiliation agreements, some options to enroll at other universities, and programs run by provider educational institutions or organizations that manage and host students on site. The Center for Study Away also allows students to propose their own study away or direct-enroll programs for approval by the center. Additionally, Macalester offers courses on campus with an embedded short-term study away component to enhance place-based, experiential student learning.

=== Academic consortia memberships ===
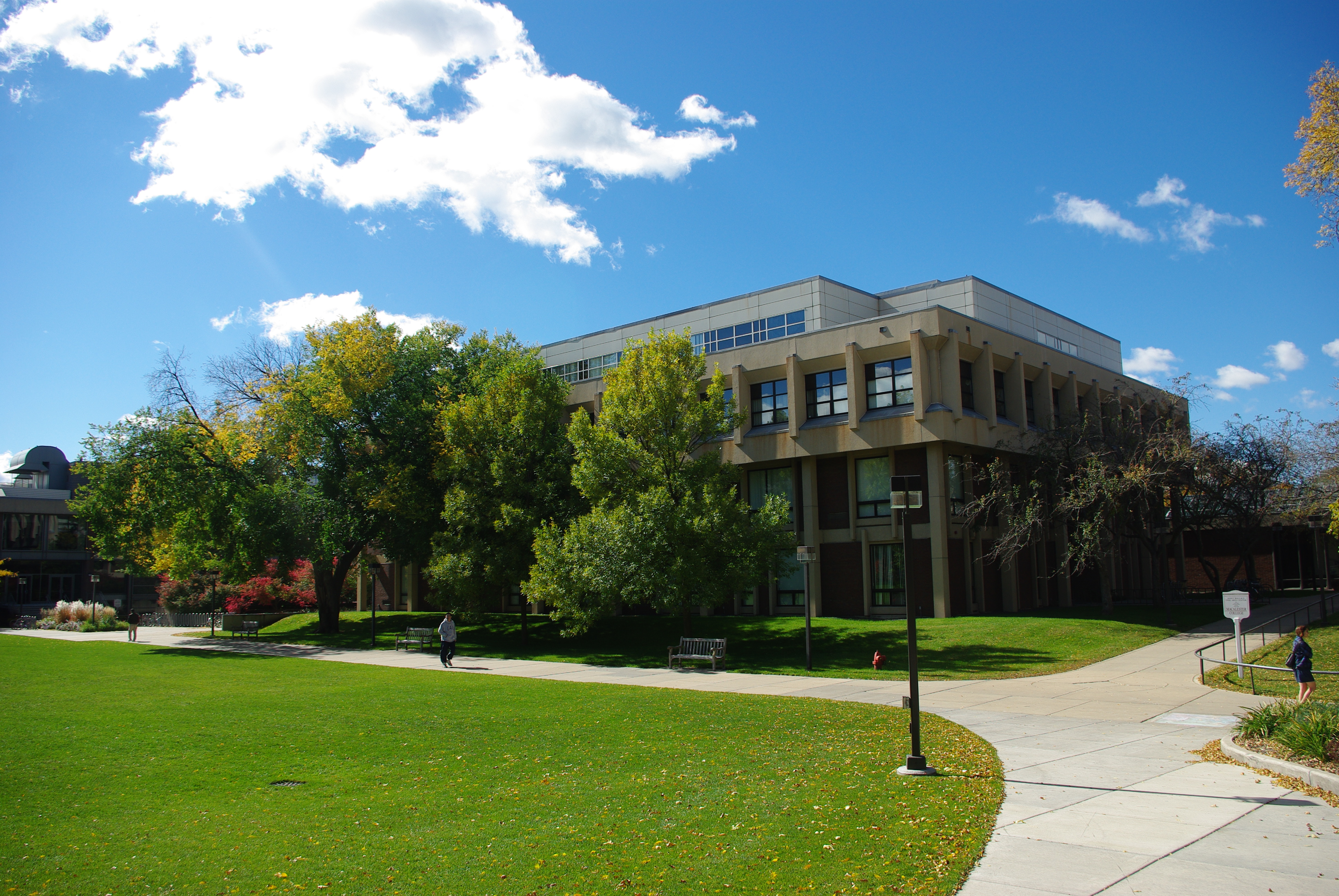
Humanities Building

Macalester is a member of the Associated Colleges of the Twin Cities (ACTC), a consortium of five liberal arts colleges in Saint Paul and Minneapolis formed to develop cooperative programs and offer cross-registration to their students. The other members are the University of St. Thomas, Augsburg University, Hamline University, and St. Catherine University. In addition to over 800 courses available on campus, Macalester students have access to all courses offered through the consortium without paying additional tuition.

=== "Imagine, Macalester" strategic plan ===
In 2021, Macalester embarked on its new strategic planning process, "Imagine, Macalester". Claiming to be operating from a position of strength, college leadership recognized significant headwinds in the higher education industry demanding dynamic planning. This included industry-wide pressures such as rising costs pushing tuition rates up and fewer students applying to four-year colleges as well as specific pressures such as underperformance in alumni fundraising compared to peer schools.

College leadership formed a group of "Strategic Planning Champions", representing students, staff, faculty, and alumni groups. The group worked to engage their constituencies to better inform the final plan. The strategic planning committee unveiled its draft plan in the summer of 2022, and the board of trustees approved it in October.

=== New mascot and branding ===
In 2024, as part of Macalester's 150^{th} anniversary celebration and in response to strategic planning goals, the college released a new logo, mascot, and branding concept heavily influencing its athletics presence. After an intensive community engagement process, the college selected the Highland Cow, nicknamed "Coo", as its new mascot. The athletics teams remain known as the Scots but are represented by Coo. The new mascot was part of a complete overhaul of the athletics branding, guided by a set of principles seeking to unify the community and modernize the athletics department's visual identity.

== Tuition and financial aid ==
Each admitted student receives a financial aid package that meets 100% of demonstrated need for financial aid. Starting with students who begin study in fall 2026, domestic students with family income below $100,000 and typical assets will receive a full-tuition scholarship.

59% of Macalester students receive need-based grants from the college. The average financial aid award for full-time students with demonstrated need in 2025–26 was $67,609, and 90% of full-time students received financial aid. Macalester's comprehensive tuition, room, and board fee for the 2026–27 academic year was $92,154.

== Student life ==
=== Student body ===
Macalester maintains a high international enrollment for its institutional type as a percentage of its student body. As of fall 2025, international students constituted 16% of the student body. Its 2,068 students come from 49 U.S. states, Washington D.C., American Samoa, Puerto Rico, the Northern Mariana Islands and 107 countries; 40% of the U.S. student body are students of color. Macalester has a strong relationship with the United World Colleges, a network of International Baccalaureate schools designed for students interested in gaining leadership and cross-cultural skills in a global context. Since 1986, Macalester has welcomed UWC students, with 18 UWC campuses represented at Macalester and over 500 UWC alumni who have graduated from Macalester.

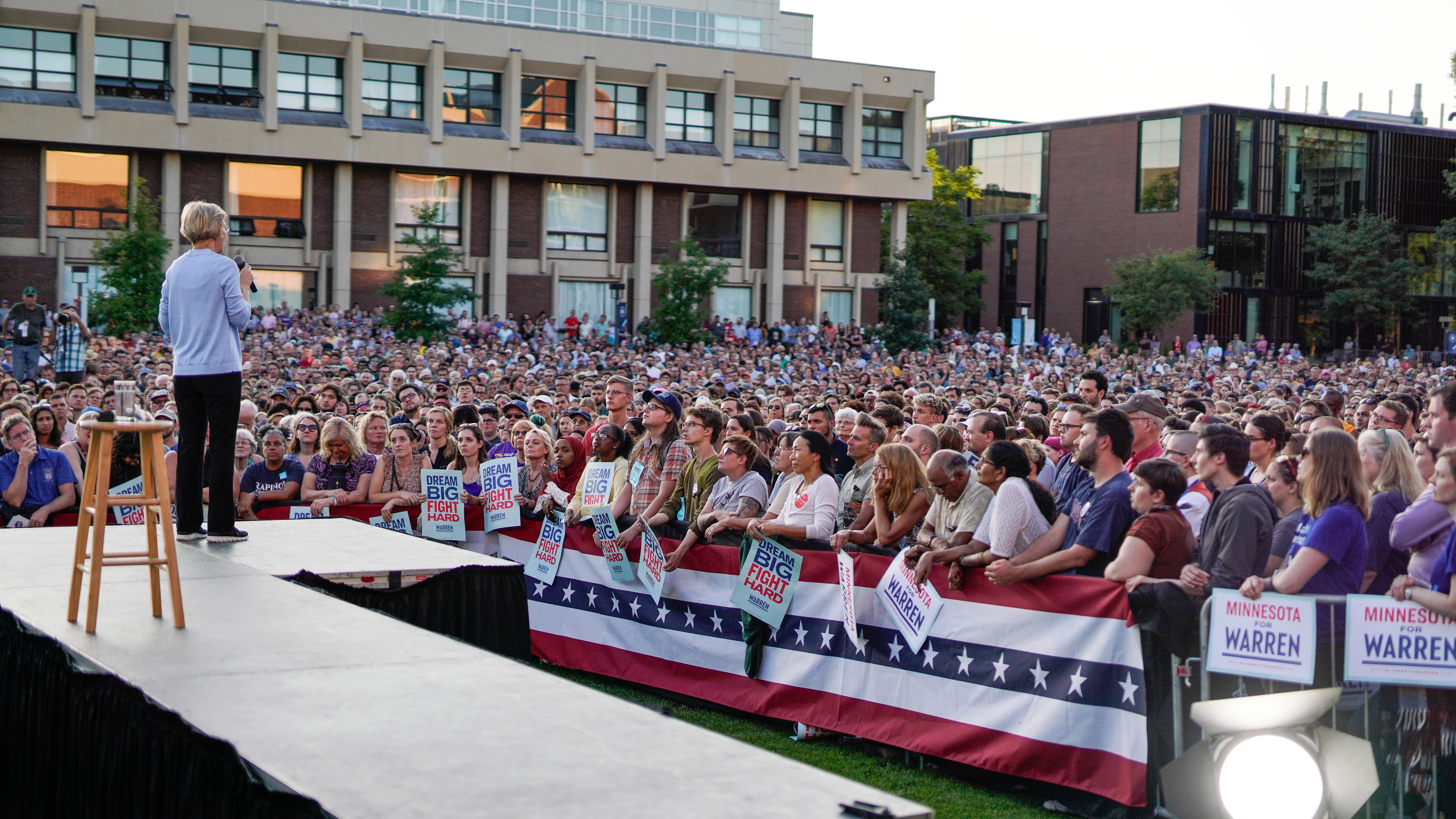
Elizabeth Warren speaking at Shaw Field during her 2020 presidential campaign

=== Civic engagement ===
Macalester is one of 360 institutions that have been awarded the Carnegie Community Engagement Classification for excellence in civic engagement. The college encourages student dialogue by bringing in speakers, hosting an International Roundtable to bring distinguished international scholars to discuss emerging global issues, and hosting collective meetings such as Women of Color.

Macalester links academic learning to community involvement. During the 2024-25 academic year, 45 professors in 24 Macalester departments offered 68 courses with community engagement components. In 2011–12, 16 departments offered 59 courses with civic engagement components. Each year approximately 200 students complete internships, 65% of which are in the nonprofit sector, schools, government, or the arts. Macalester also allows students to earn their work-study financial aid award while working at a local nonprofit or elementary school.

Almost all students (96%) volunteer in the Twin Cities while at Macalester. The Macalester Civic Engagement center provides opportunities for students to engage in civic activity, volunteerism, and community engagement while at the college. Mobilize Mac is the college's political engagement arm, promoting democratic engagement and elections-related work. Many student organizations encourage active civic engagement, including Democracy Matters, Friends of Médecins Sans Frontières, Green@Mac, and Macalester Habitat for Humanity.

Macalester is the primary financial contributor and sponsor of the Minnesota Institute for Talented Youth, which was founded in 1967 and has its main facilities in the Lampert Building. MITY provides two different gifted education programs during the summer and one on weekends during the academic year. Macalester also participates in Project Pericles, a commitment to further encourage civic engagement at the college. In 2000, Macalester signed the Talloires Declaration, making a commitment to environmental sustainability, as well as a sweatshop pledge, making a commitment to fair-labor practices in the purchase of college apparel.

=== LGBTQ community ===
The Campus Pride Index awarded Macalester five out of five stars for LGBTQ-friendly campuses. In 2007, The Princeton Review named Macalester the nation's most gay-friendly college. Macalester has started an initiative to ensure access to single-stall and all-gender bathrooms across campus.

Macalester has a student-powered Gender and Sexuality Resource Center that aims to build a culture of resistance against all forms of oppression. It also has active LGBTQ student organizations and groups, including Queer Union, the Trans Identity Collective, Allies Project Training, and the Macalester Out and Proud Community.

=== Pipe band ===
The college has a pipe band consisting of around 20 students, alumni, and community members. Bagpipes are performed at significant college events and are heard when applicants open their acceptance letters. Macalester offers students free bagpipes and lessons and has an official tartan plaid. In the 1930s, students jokingly brought bagpipes to campus as a reference to the college's Scottish name, which started the tradition.

== Athletics ==
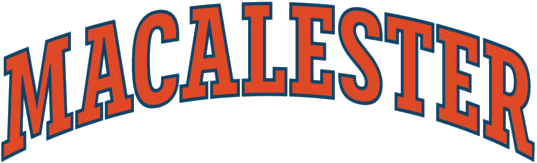
Macalester athletics wordmark

Macalester's athletic teams are nicknamed the Scots. Macalester is a member of the NCAA Division III's Minnesota Intercollegiate Athletic Conference (MIAC) for most sports. Approximately 400 students are varsity student-athletes.

The Scots' football team set an NCAA Division III record by losing 50 straight games from 1974 to 1980. Earlham College broke that record in 2018, losing 51 straight games. In 1977, Macalester set a Division III record by allowing 59.1 points per game. The losing streak ended in dramatic fashion: Kicker Bob Kaye put a 23-yarder through the uprights with 11 seconds remaining in a September 1980 game as the Scots beat Mount Senario College. The Scots' football team left the MIAC after the 2001 season and competed as an independent until 2014, when it joined the Midwest Conference. Under head coach Tony Jennison, Macalester won the Midwest Conference title in its first year in the league. This was the Scots' first conference football title since 1947. Macalester also won nine games in 2014, the most ever in a Scots season in its 121 years of intercollegiate football. That year, the team earned its first NCAA Division III playoff appearance. In 2020, the football team returned to the MIAC.

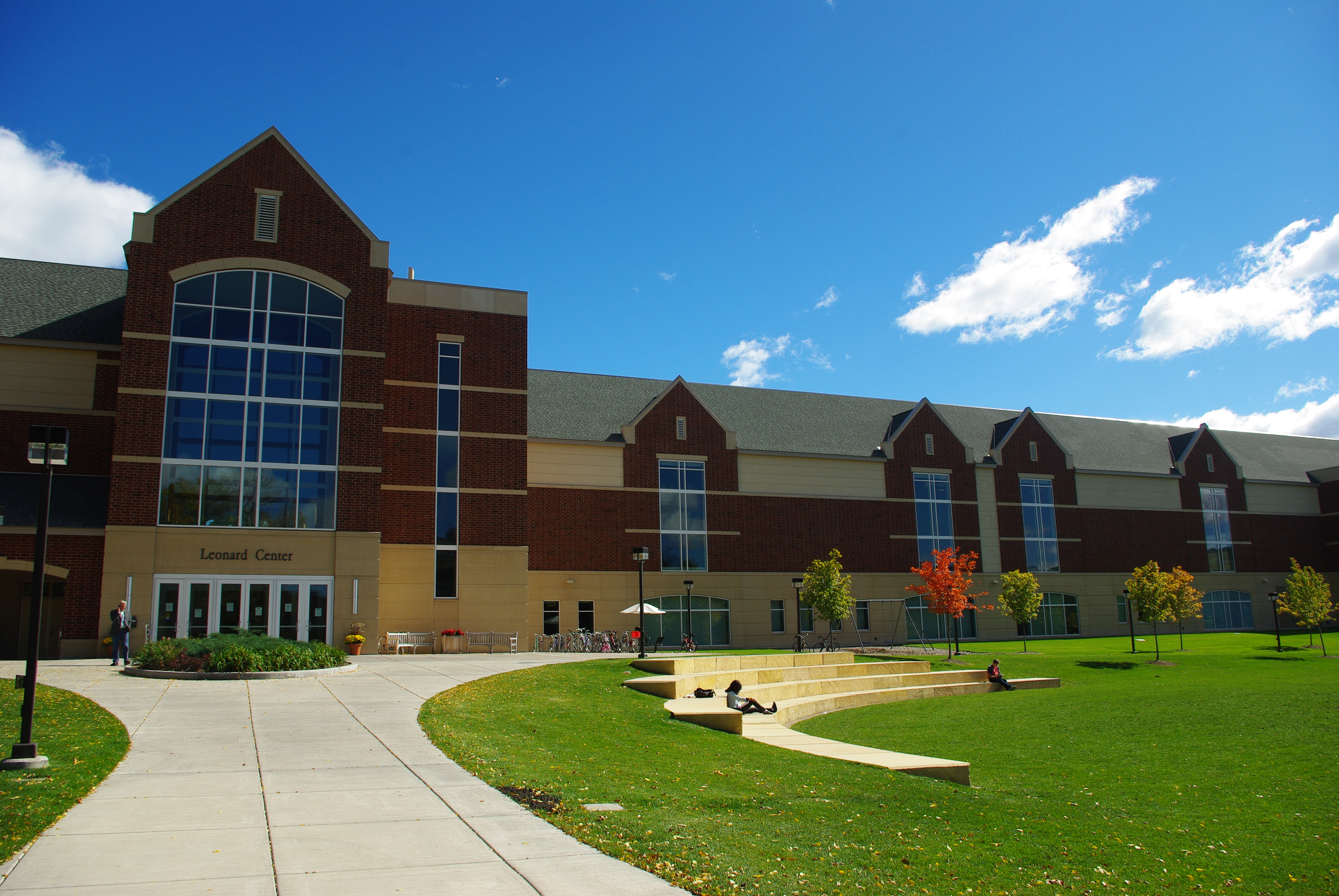
The Leonard Center athletic and wellness complex

Both men's and women's soccer teams remain competitive, appearing in multiple NCAA playoffs since 1988, with the men's team making 12 national tournaments and the women's team appearing in 15. The women's team won the NCAA championship in 1998 and finished second in 1999. The men's team has won 12 MIAC championships and the women's team has won eight MIAC titles. Coach John Leaney, who won 489 games as the coach of both teams, was honored in 2023 when Macalester named the field at Macalester Stadium "John Leaney Field".Mental Floss named one of Macalester sports fans' most notorious cheers—"Drink blood, smoke crack, worship Satan, go Mac!"—one of its "7 Memorable Sports Chants".

In 2026, the women's varsity water polo team, members of the Collegiate Water Polo Association conference, placed third in the Division III national championship and the baseball team earned a berth to the NCAA tournament.

Macalester Athletics compete in the Leonard Center, which opened in August 2008. The $45 million facility encompasses 175,000 square feet and includes a 200-meter track, a natatorium, a fitness center, several multipurpose rooms, and a health and wellness center. Materials from the former facility were disposed of in environmentally friendly ways, with some incorporated into the new structure.

== Notable alumni ==
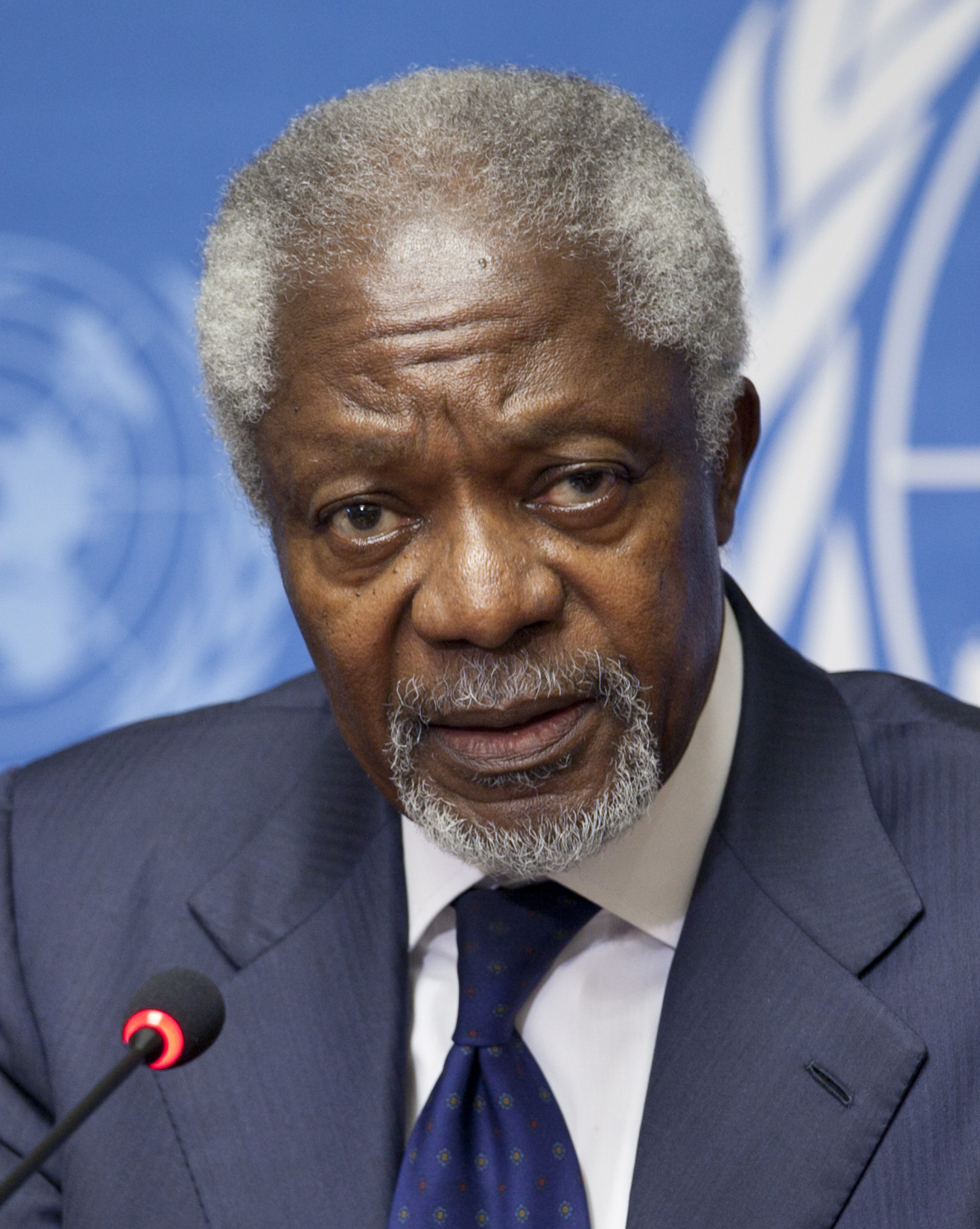
Kofi Annan '61, Secretary-General of the United Nations and Nobel Peace Prize laureate

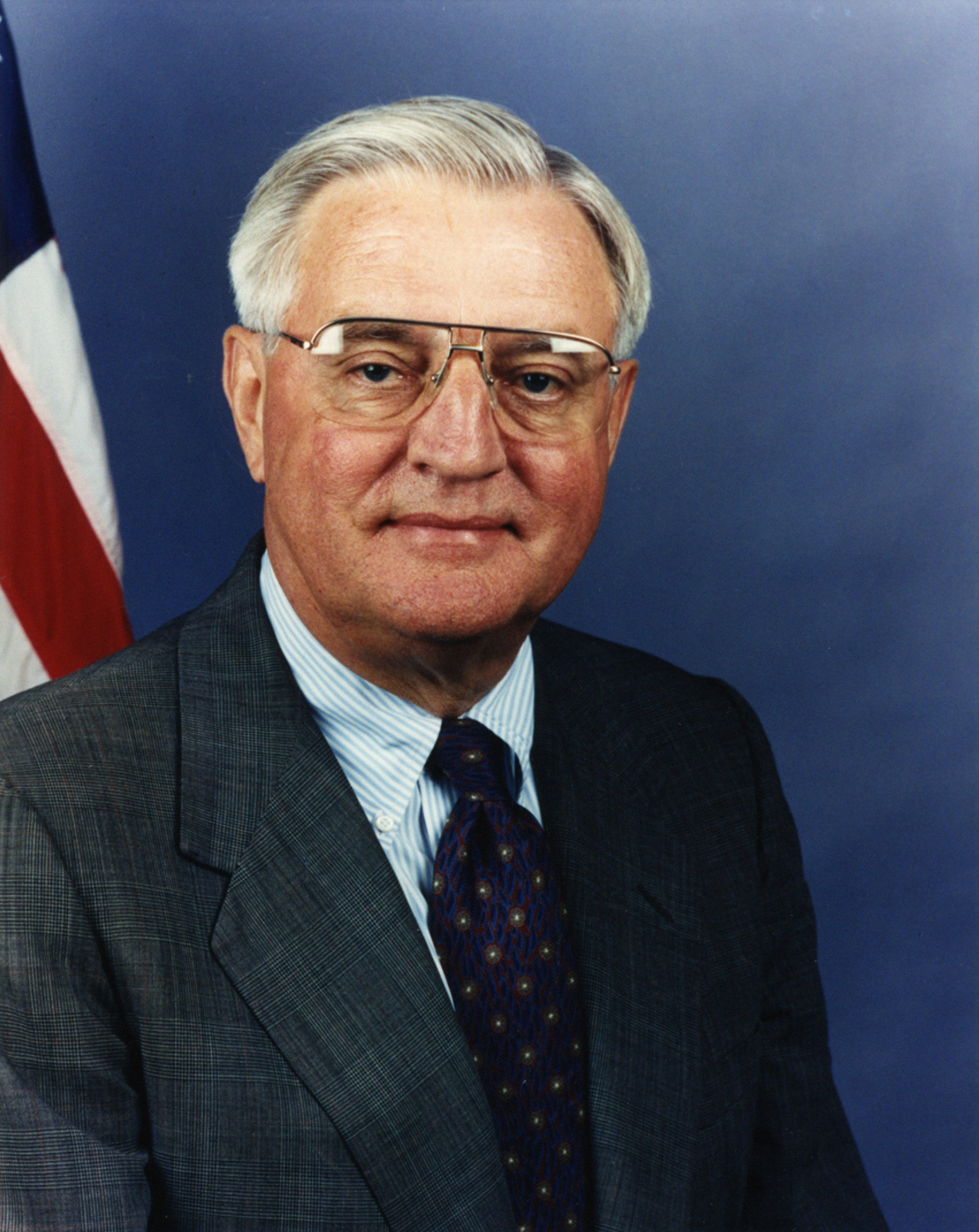
Walter Mondale, '50, Vice President of the United States (1977–1981)

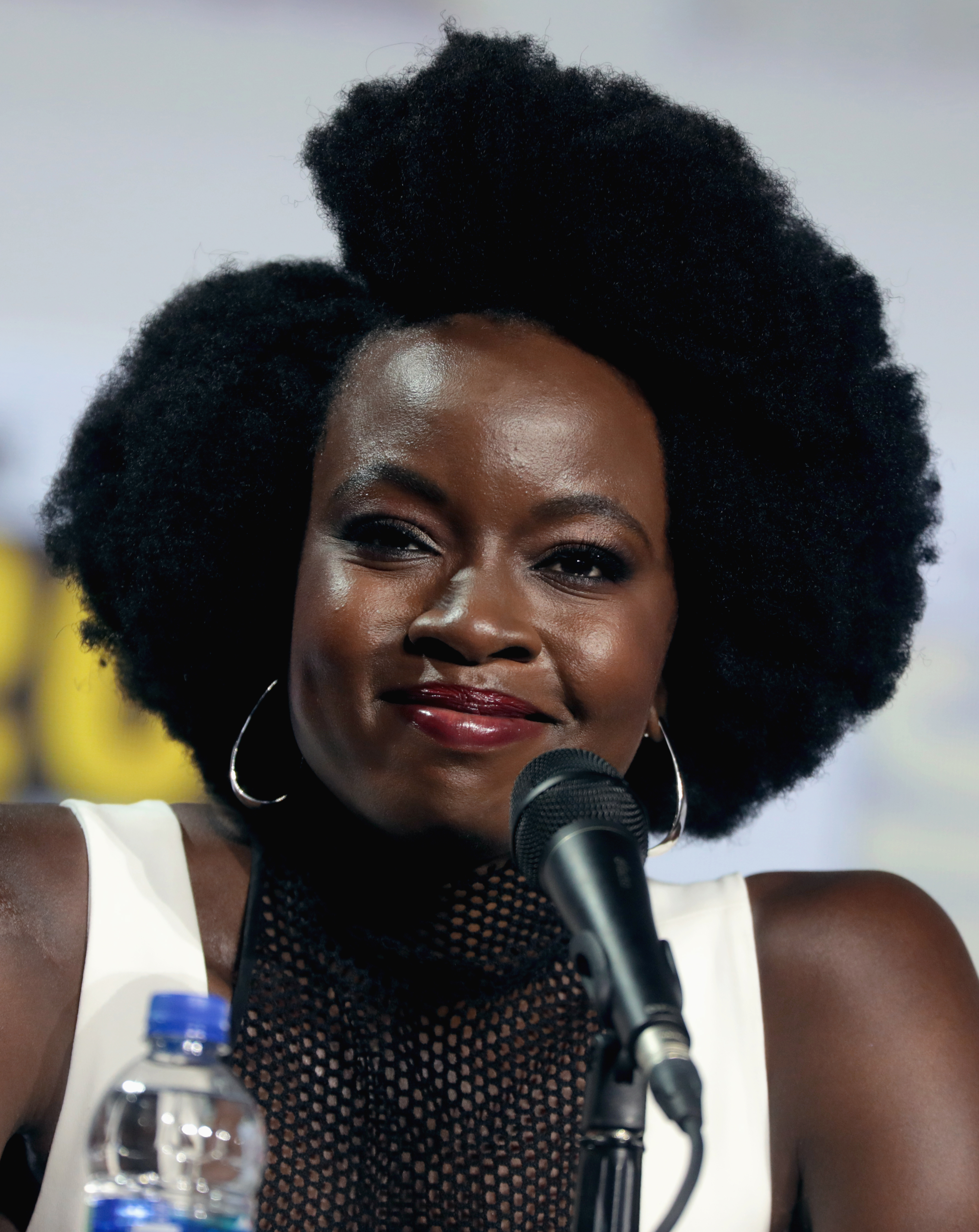
Danai Gurira '01, actress and playwright

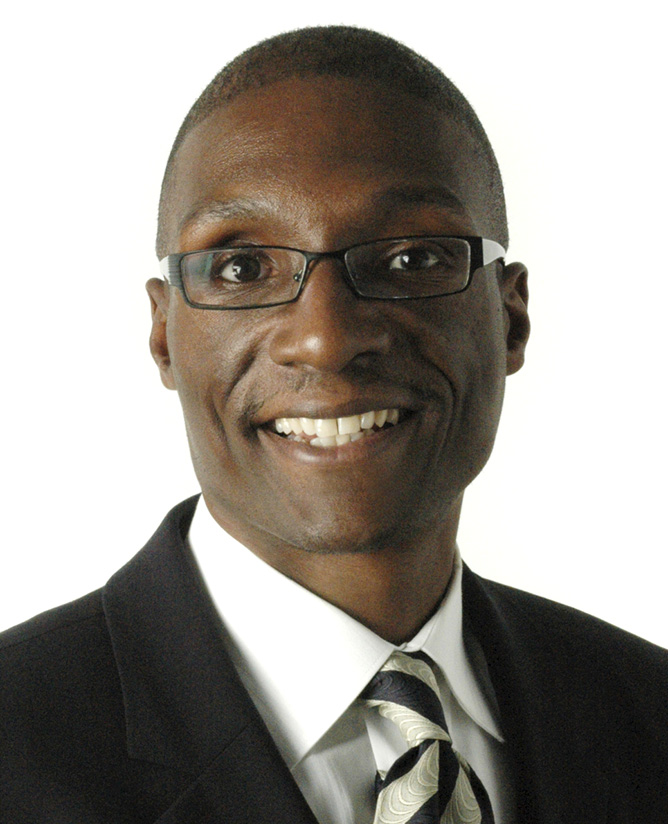
Bobby Joe Champion, '87, President of the Minnesota Senate

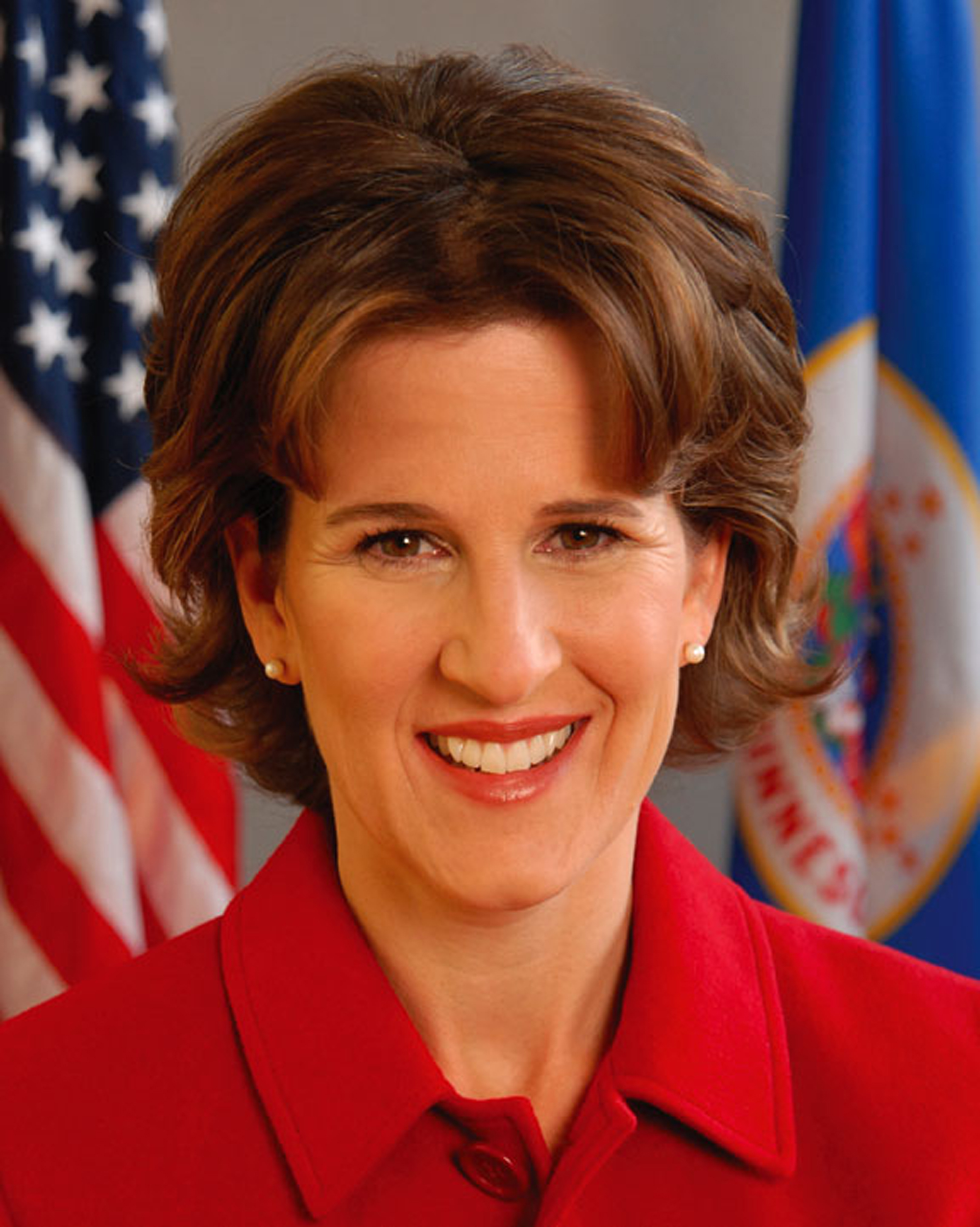
Rebecca Otto, '85, Minnesota State Auditor

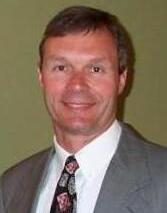
Scott McCallum '72, Governor of Wisconsin
- Jeremy Allaire, 1993, co-founder of Circle
- Paul Anderson, 1965, Minnesota Supreme Court justice
- Kofi Annan, 1961, Secretary-General of the United Nations and Nobel Peace Prize laureate
- Siah Armajani, 1963, sculptor
- Charles Baxter, 1969, writer and University of Minnesota professor
- Peter Berg, 1983, actor and film director
- Richard P. Binzel, 1980, astronomer and Massachusetts Institute of Technology professor
- Amy Briggs, 1984, video game designer
- Mike Carr, 1973, game designer and commodities trader
- Sokhary Chau, politician
- Michael James Davis, 1969, judge of the United States District Court for the District of Minnesota
- Chank Diesel, 1990, typographer
- Mark Doten, 2001, novelist and librettist
- Ari Emanuel, 1983, talent agent
- Matt Entenza, 1983, Minnesota state representative
- William P. Gerberding, 1951, president of the University of Washington
- Danai Gurira, 2001, actress and playwright
- Christy Haynes, 1998, chemistry professor at the University of Minnesota
- Marilyn Gayle Hoff, 1964, author, educator, activist
- Mary Karr, 1974, writer
- T. Kingfisher, 1998, writer and illustrator
- Julia Kirtland, 1987, distance runner
- Catharine Deaver Lealtad, 1915, pediatrician and humanitarian
- Carl Lumbly, 1973, actor
- Walter Mondale, 1950, vice president of the United States and U.S. ambassador to Japan
- Bob Mould, 1982, musician and writer
- Tim O'Brien, 1968, writer
- Shawn Lawrence Otto, 1984, screenwriter and film producer
- Tim Paulson, 1975, California labor leader
- Stephen Paulus, 1971, composer, American Composers Forum co-founder
- Sharon Sayles Belton, 1973, mayor of Minneapolis
- Will Sheff, 1997, musician
- Richmond Sarpong, 1995, chemistry professor at University of California, Berkeley
- Fred Swaniker, 1999, African Leadership Academy co-founder
- DeWitt Wallace, 1911, founder of Reader's Digest, philanthropist
- Christopher O. Ward, 1976, executive director of the Port Authority of New York and New Jersey
- Robert Willis Warren, 1950, judge of the United States District Court for the Eastern District of Wisconsin
- Dave Zirin, 1996, political sportswriter

== See also ==
- List of colleges and universities in Minnesota
- Higher education in Minnesota
