= Albert W. Hillestad =

American Episcopal bishop (1924–2007)

The Right Reverend Albert William Hillestad D.D.
- Bishop of Springfield
- Church: Episcopal Church
- Diocese: Springfield
- Elected: October 7, 1971
- In office: 1972–1981
- Predecessor: Albert A. Chambers
- Successor: Donald M. Hultstrand

Orders
- Ordination: October 22, 1950 by William W. Horstick
- Consecration: February 19, 1972 by John E. Hines

Personal details
- Born: July 11, 1924 New Richmond, Wisconsin, United States
- Died: June 14, 2007 (aged 82) San Miguel de Allende, Mexico
- Buried: St Paul's Cathedral
- Denomination: Anglican
- Parents: Evar Hillestad & Elenora Tracy
- Spouse: Carol Joyce Hutchens (m. 1954; died 1978)
- Children: 7
- Education: University of Wisconsin; Seabury-Western Theological Seminary

Albert William Hillestad (July 11, 1924 – June 14, 2007) was an Episcopal priest and bishop of the Episcopal Diocese of Springfield from 1972 to 1981.

== Early and family life ==
Born on July 11, 1924, in New Richmond, Wisconsin to Evar and Eleanora Hillestad. Albert Hillestad graduated from the University of Wisconsin in 1947 and three years later from the Seabury-Western Theological Seminary. He married (and ultimately survived) Carol J. Hillestad, with whom he had seven children who survived their parents.

== Ministry ==
Ordained to the diaconate in April 1950 and priesthood on in October 1950, Hillestad served as an assistant at Christ Church in La Crosse, Wisconsin from 1950 to 1951, then at the Church of the Ascension in Chicago from 1951 to 1957. He then returned to Wisconsin to serve as vicar of St. Mark's church in Oconto, Wisconsin (1957–64) before moving to the Episcopal Diocese of Springfield, where he accepted a call to serve at St. Andrew's Church in Carbondale, Illinois (1964–1972).

Hillestad was selected as the diocese's bishop coadjutor, and Presiding bishop John E. Hines led the consecration on February 19, 1972, joined by Springfield's bishop Albert A. Chambers (who would shortly leave the Anglican Communion due to his opposition to the ordination of women as priests) and bishop Frederick B. Wolf of Maine. Bishop Hillestad took office as the diocese's eighth bishop on September 24, 1972. Rt.Rev. Hillestad submitted his resignation from his see in 1980, citing health reasons. The diocese selected Donald M. Hultstrand as his successor.

In retirement Hillestad served at the Easter Seals Rehabilitation Center in Mobile, Alabama, before moving in 1989 to San Miguel de Allende, Mexico, where he continued to volunteer his time serving handicapped children at the Centro de Crecimiento.

== Death ==
Bishop Hillestad died in San Miguel de Allende on June 14, 2007.

== See also ==
- List of bishops of the Episcopal Church in the United States of America
