= Bexley Hall =

American Episcopal seminary (1824–2013)

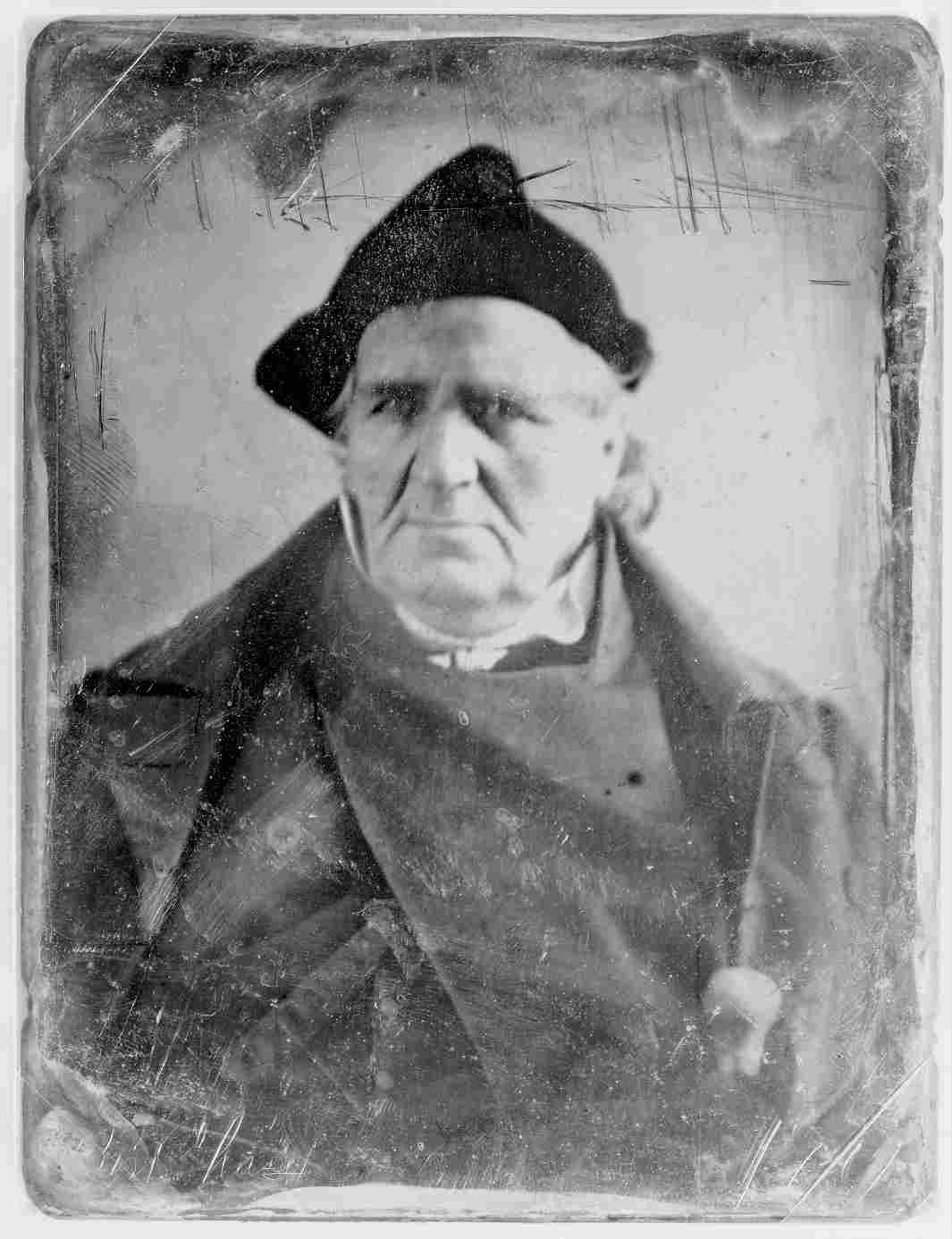
Philander Chase was the founder and first president of Bexley Hall and Kenyon College, and later became Presiding Bishop of the Episcopal Church

Bexley Hall was an Episcopal seminary from 1824 until April 27, 2013, when it federated with Seabury-Western Theological Seminary as Bexley Hall Seabury-Western Theological Seminary Federation, also known as Bexley Seabury. For three years, Bexley Seabury seminary operated from two locations—in Bexley, Ohio, a suburb of Columbus, and in Chicago, Illinois —until July 2016 when it consolidated at a single campus location at Chicago Theological Seminary in Chicago's Hyde Park/Woodlawn district. Bexley Seabury is one of nine official seminaries of the Episcopal Church in the United States of America. Bexley Seabury's mission includes, "creating new networks of Christian formation, entrepreneurial leadership and bold inquiry in the service of the Gospel".

Bexley Hall Seminary had an EIN of 23-7167956 as a 501(c)(3) Public Charity. Bexley Hall Seabury Western Theological Seminary Federation Inc. has an EIN of 46-2322021 as a 501(c)(3) Public Charity.

== History ==
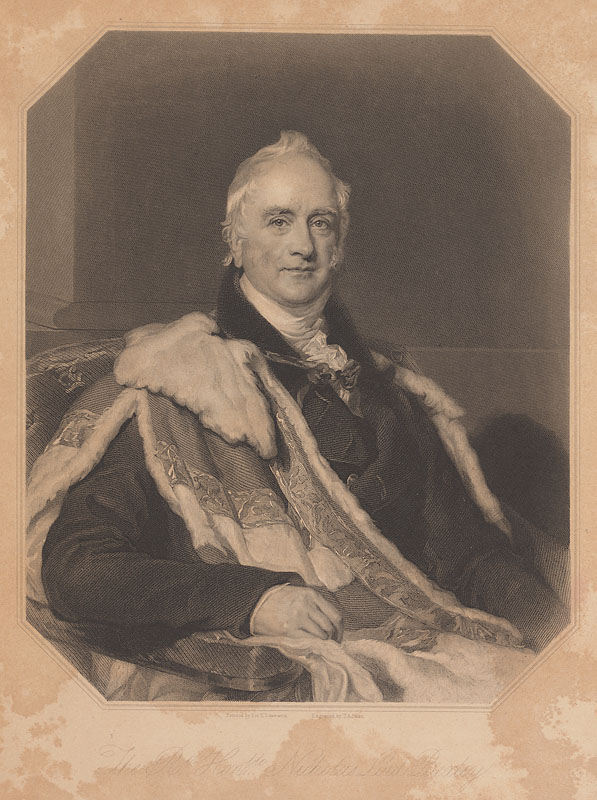
Lord Bexley was the longest serving UK Chancellor of the Exchequer

Bexley Hall seminary was established in 1824 by Bishop Philander Chase in conjunction with the establishment of Kenyon College in Gambier, Ohio.

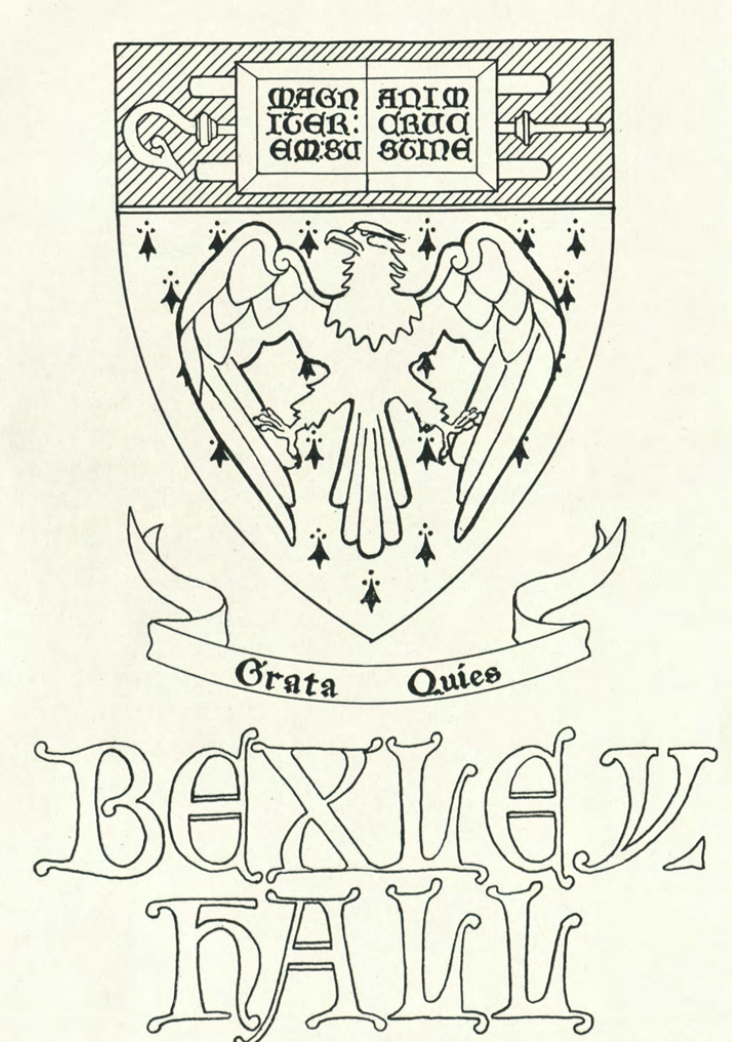
Bexley Seminary Shield

Bexley Hall was later identified separately, and was named in honour of Nicholas Vansittart, 1st Baron Bexley, an early benefactor of Kenyon College.

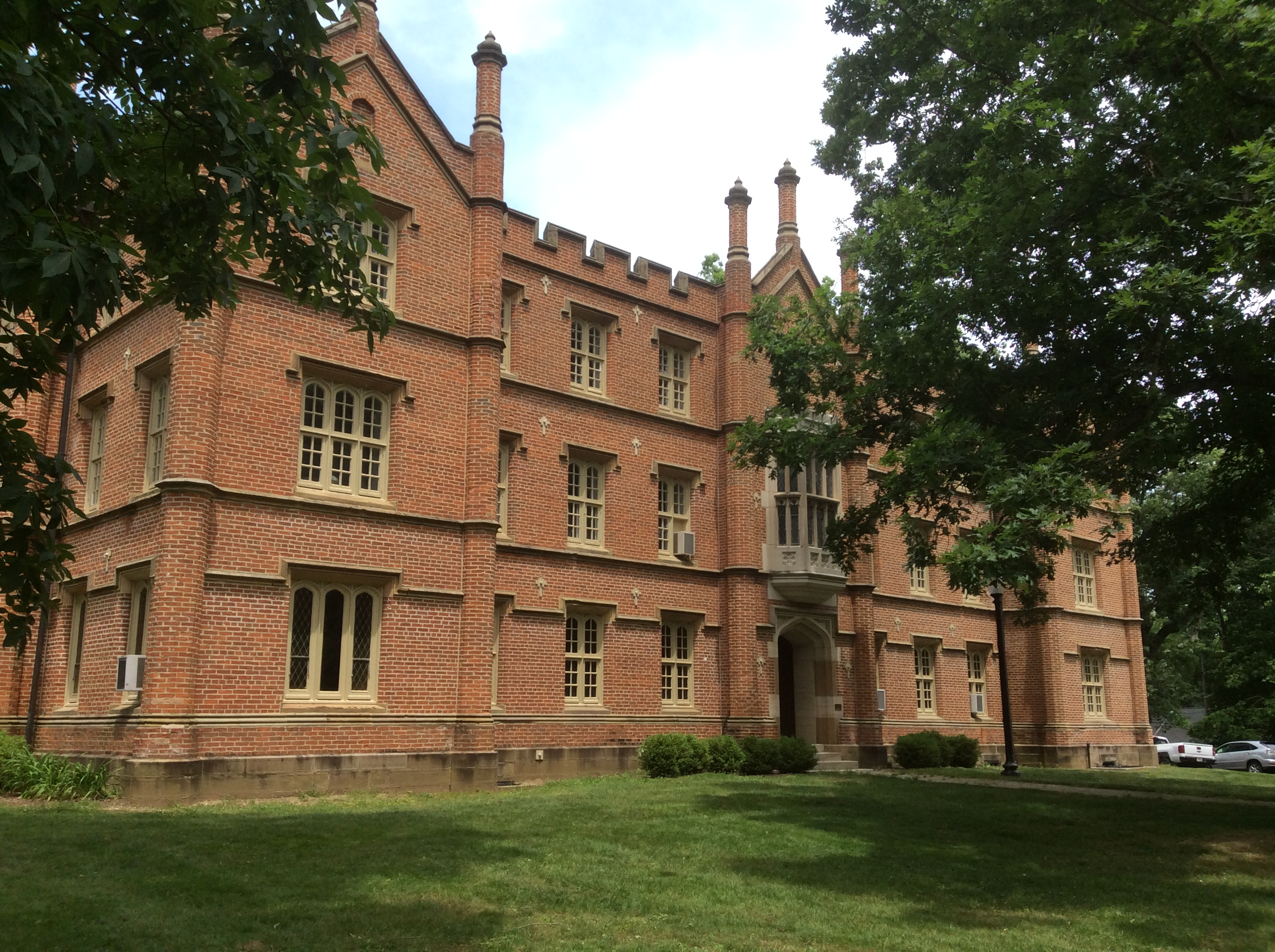
Old Bexley Hall Building, Kenyon College, Gambier, Ohio

Bexley Hall disassociated with Kenyon in 1968 and moved from Gambier to Rochester, New York, where it affiliated with Colgate Rochester Divinity School, which since became Colgate Rochester Crozer Divinity School. Although the seminary is no longer affiliated with Kenyon College, the 1839 seminary building in Gambier is still known as Bexley Hall. After 30 years in New York state, in 1998, Bexley Hall re-established a campus in Ohio through a partnership with Trinity Lutheran Seminary of Columbus, adjacent to the Capital University campus, a liberal arts institution with undergraduate, graduate and professional school divisions, in a suburb coincidentally named Bexley. In February 2008, the dean announced the May closure of the Rochester campus, citing falling student numbers and more stringent accreditation requirements. In addition to its relationship with Trinity Lutheran Seminary, Bexley Hall has developed partnerships with the Pontifical College Josephinum and the Methodist Theological School in Ohio that give students registration access to selected classes. Additionally, the transformative federated relationship between Bexley Hall and Seabury-Western seminaries has enhanced the new school's mission, geographic scope and operational capacity.

In April 2013 Bexley Hall inaugurated a historic federated relationship with Seabury-Western Theological Seminary and together formed Bexley Seabury seminary. Bexley Seabury offers a Master of Divinity and two Doctor of Ministry degrees as well as a diploma in Anglican Studies and continuing educations and lifelong learning courses.

== Notable alumni ==
- James P. deWolfe (1896-1966), bishop of the Episcopal Diocese of Long Island
- William Crane Gray (1835-1919), bishop of South Florida
- Lloyd E. Gressle (1919-1999), bishop of the Episcopal Diocese of Bethlehem
- Donald M. Hultstrand, Bishop of the Episcopal Diocese of Springfield
- S. Arthur Huston (1876-1963), bishop of Olympia
- Peter Kwong (鄺廣傑) (born 1936), archbishop and primate of the Hong Kong Sheng Kung Hui
- Stephen T. Lane, bishop of Maine
- Mark Lattime, Bishop of Alaska
- Santosh Marray, Eleventh Bishop of the Episcopal Diocese of Easton
- Philip McNairy, Sixth Bishop of the Episcopal Diocese of Minnesota
- Ernest Vincent Shayler, Bishop of Nebraska
- Douglas E. Theuner, bishop of New Hampshire
- William W. Wiedrich, suffragan bishop of the Episcopal Diocese of Chicago
- Charles D. Williams (1860-1923), fourth bishop of the Episcopal Diocese of Michigan

== Bibliography ==
- Thomas Ferguson, Beyond Walls: A Bicentennial History of Bexley Hall Seabury-Western Seminary Federation (Wipf and Stock, 2025) ISBN 9798385240869
