= John Chanler White =

American bishop

The Right Reverend John Chanler White D.D., S.T.D.
- Bishop of Springfield
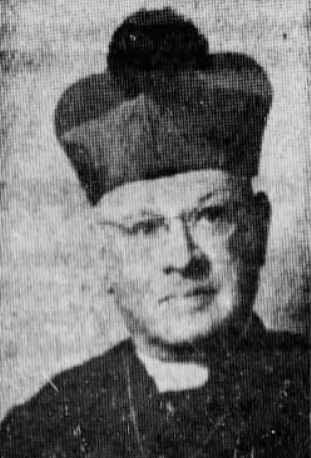
- Church: Episcopal Church
- Diocese: Springfield
- Elected: February 19, 1924
- In office: 1924–1947
- Predecessor: Granville Hudson Sherwood
- Successor: Richard T. Loring

Orders
- Ordination: June 11, 1892 by George Franklin Seymour
- Consecration: May 14, 1924 by Ethelbert Talbot

Personal details
- Born: May 21, 1867 Laurens County, South Carolina, United States
- Died: February 11, 1956 (aged 88) Springfield, Illinois, United States
- Buried: Oak Ridge Cemetery
- Denomination: Anglican
- Parents: Thomas Grimke White & Martha Phoebe Edings
- Spouse: Katherine Withers Dresser (m. 1891; died 1948)
- Children: 2

John Chanler White (May 21, 1867 – February 11, 1956) was the fourth bishop of the Diocese of Springfield in The Episcopal Church from 1924 to 1947, having previously served as archdeacon and missionary.

== Early life and education ==
White was born on May 21, 1867, in Laurens County, South Carolina, the son of Thomas Grimke White and Martha Phoebe Edings. He studied at St Stephen's College, graduating with a Bachelor of Arts in 1888, and being honored with a Doctor of Divinity years later. This was followed by a period of studies at the General Theological Seminary, graduating in 1891. General also awarded him a Doctor of Sacred Theology.

== Ordained ministry ==
White was ordained deacon on May 24, 1891, and priest on June 11, 1892. He served as rector of St Paul's Church in Rantoul, Illinois and St Thomas' Church in Thomasboro, Illinois between 1891 and 1893. He then became chaplain and private Secretary to Bishop of Springfield, whilst serving as priest-in-charge of Christ Church in Waverly, Illinois between 1893 and 1897. In 1897, he was appointed rector of Holy Trinity Church in Hartwell, Cincinnati, while in 1900, he became rector of St Paul's Church in East St. Louis, Illinois. In 1909, he became the General Missionary in East St. Louis until 1916, when he became rector of Trinity Church in Lincoln, Illinois, and subsequently Archdeacon of Springfield.

== Bishop ==
On February 19, 1924, White was elected Bishop of Springfield, and was consecrated on May 14, 1924, by Presiding Bishop Ethelbert Talbot. He worked to create a self-autonomous diocese with no need of reliance on the nation Church for financial aid, and worked to establish and prolong the missionary spirit of the diocese.

== Personal life ==
White was an opponent of vivisection and was an honorary vice-president of the New England Anti-Vivisection Society. He commented that "it is time, fully time, that all Christian people awake to the necessity of taking an active part in the fight against what I dare call the crime of vivisection".

He retired in May 1947, and died on February 11, 1956, in a hospital in Springfield, Illinois.
