= Henry A. Neely =

American bishop

The Right Reverend Henry Adams Neely D.D.
- Bishop of Maine
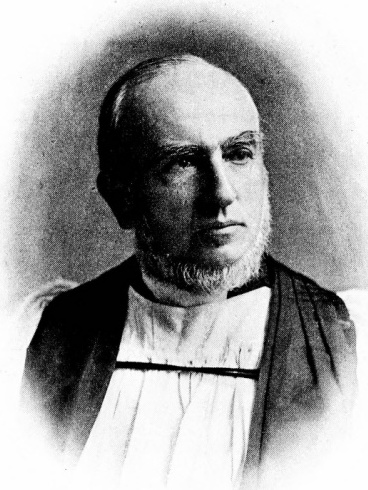
- Church: Episcopal Church
- Diocese: Maine
- Elected: 1866
- In office: 1867–1899
- Predecessor: George Burgess
- Successor: Robert Codman

Orders
- Ordination: June 18, 1854 by William H. DeLancey
- Consecration: January 25, 1867 by John Henry Hopkins

Personal details
- Born: May 14, 1830 Fayetteville, New York, United States
- Died: October 31, 1899 (aged 69) Portland, Maine, United States
- Buried: Evergreen Cemetery (Portland, Maine)
- Denomination: Anglican
- Parents: Albert Neely & Phoebe Pearsall
- Spouse: Mary Floyd Delafield
- Children: 2

Henry Adams Neely (May 14, 1830 – October 31, 1899) was the second bishop of Maine in the Episcopal Church in the United States of America.

== Early life and education ==
Neely was born on May 14, 1830, in Fayetteville, New York, the son of Albert Neely and Phoebe Pearsall. He studied at Hobart College and graduated in 1849. He also worked as a tutor between 1850 and 1852, whilst he was studying for a Bachelor of Divinity. In 1866 he was awarded a Doctor of Divinity from Hobart.

== Ordained ministry ==
Neely was ordained deacon on December 19, 1852, in Geneva, New York, and a priest on June 18, 1854, in Trinity Church, Utica, New York. He served as rector of Calvary Church in Utica, New York. Between 1855 and 1862 he served as rector of Christ Church in Rochester, New York, and then moved on to become chaplain at Hobart College, where he remained till 1864. After that, he became assistant minister at Trinity Church in New York City, a post he held till 1867.

== Episcopacy ==
Neely was elected Bishop of Maine in 1866 and was consecrated on January 25, 1867, in Trinity Church by Presiding Bishop John Henry Hopkins. Upon his arrival in Maine he served as rector of St Luke's parish. He was influential in establishing a cathedral and the church of St Luke was designated as the cathedral however a new church was to be built instead. Upon its completion St Luke's Cathedral was consecrated by Bishop Neely on October 18, 1877. He died in office on October 31, 1899.

== Family ==
Neely married Mary Floyd Delafield in 1851 and together has two children.
