= Charles Clough =

Charles Clough may refer to:

- Charles Clough (artist) (born 1951), American painter
- Charles Clough (geologist) (1852–1916), British geologist and mapmaker
- Charles A. Clough (1903–1961), American prelate of the Episcopal Church
- Charlie Clough (born 1990), English footballer
- Charles F. Clough (1843–1927), American politician, mayor of Spokane, 1890–1891
