= Robert Codman =

American bishop

The Right Reverend Robert Codman D.D.
- Bishop of Maine
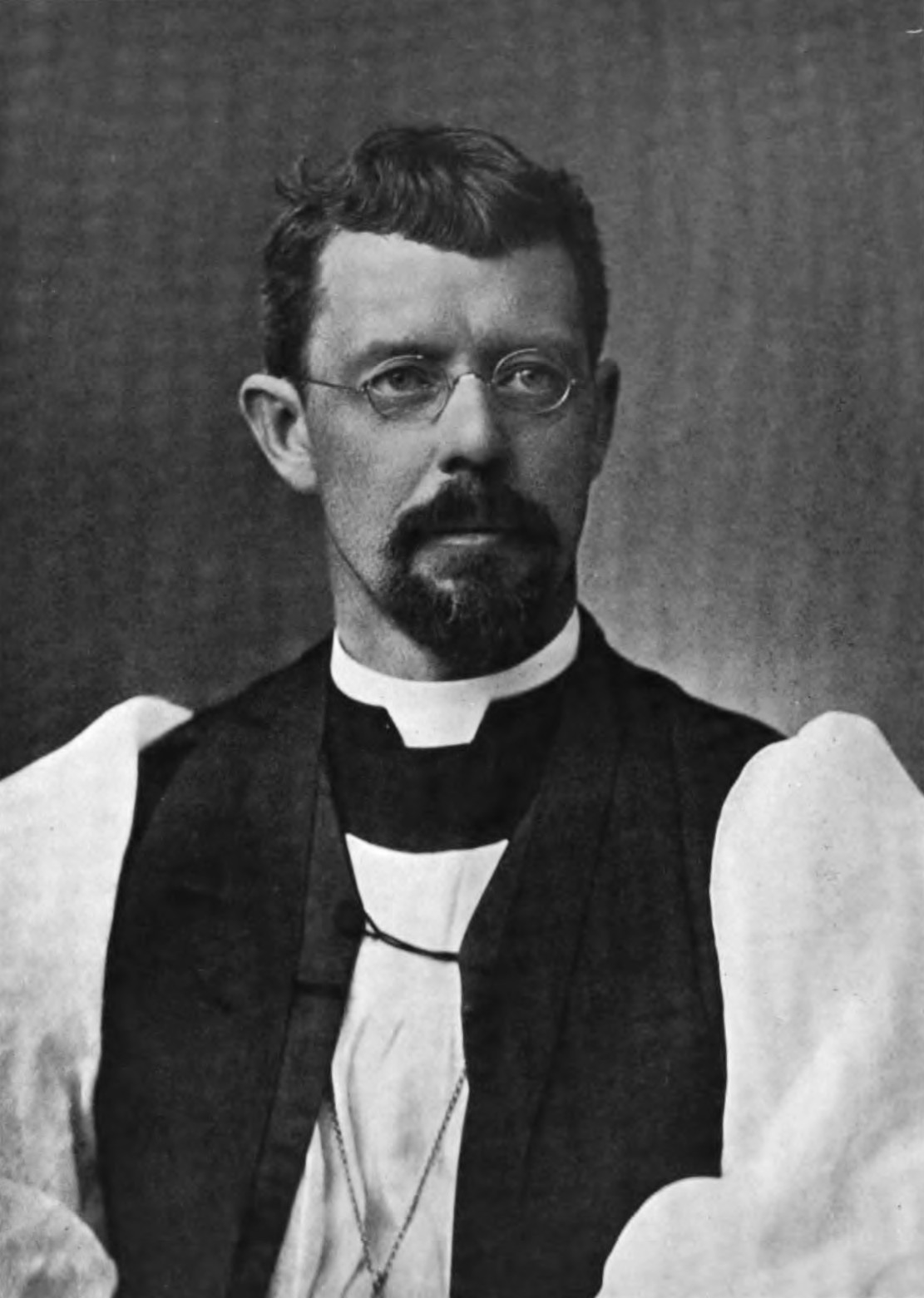
- Church: Episcopal Church
- Diocese: Maine
- In office: 1900–1915
- Predecessor: Henry A. Neely
- Successor: Benjamin Brewster

Orders
- Ordination: June 10, 1894 by Charles Chapman Grafton
- Consecration: February 24, 1900 by William Woodruff Niles

Personal details
- Born: December 30, 1859 Boston, Massachusetts, United States
- Died: October 7, 1915 (aged 55) Boston, Massachusetts, United States
- Denomination: Anglican
- Education: Harvard University

Robert Codman (December 30, 1859 – October 7, 1915) was bishop of the Episcopal Diocese of Maine, serving from 1900 to 1915.

== Early years ==
Codman was born in Boston, Massachusetts in 1859 to Robert Codman Sr., a prominent Boston lawyer. Codman's father Robert had Congregationalist ancestry, with his own father, John Codman, serving as a Congregationalist minister. Robert Codman Sr. converted to Anglicanism. By the time of his death he had become a senior warden in the Church of the Advent in Boston, which was also the parish church in which his son Robert Jr, the future bishop, grew up. Codman was educated in public schools and later graduated in Law from Harvard University in 1882.

== Ordained ministry ==
He was graduated from Harvard and practiced law. After the death of his brother, the Reverend Archibald Codman, Robert Codman sought ordination. He studied in the General Theological Seminary in New York City after which he was ordained deacon in 1893. He was appointed curate of All Saints Church in Ashmont, Boston. In 1894 he was ordained priest by Bishop Charles Chapman Grafton. He became rector of St John's Church in Boston Highlands.

He was an advocate of Muscular Christianity.

== Episcopacy ==
Codman was elected to succeed Henry A. Neely as Bishop of Maine. He was consecrated bishop on February 24, 1900, in St Luke's Cathedral in Portland. As bishop he altered and expanded the cathedral by adding the Emmanuel Chapel, which includes the Madonna and Child of John La Farge. He also expanded the bishop's residence.

He worked to increase the Episcopal presence throughout his diocese and consecrated several new church buildings.

In 1911 he presided at the opening of the Edward T. Gignoux U.S. Courthouse in Portland.

Codman served as bishop till his death in 1915.

During his later years, he was heavily involved in the Anti-Tuberculosis Society and the Citizens' Committee; he saw both as working against the disadvantages of urban life.

== Family ==
Codman married Margarette B. Porter in September 1915; he died three weeks later from a brain tumour.
