= Donald M. Hultstrand =

American bishop

The Right Reverend Donald Maynard Hultstrand D.D.
- Bishop of Springfield
- Church: Episcopal Church
- Diocese: Springfield
- Elected: September 19, 1981
- In office: 1982–1991
- Predecessor: Albert Hillestad
- Successor: Peter H. Beckwith

Orders
- Ordination: December 19, 1953 by Stephen Keeler
- Consecration: February 6, 1982 by John Allin

Personal details
- Born: April 16, 1927 Parker's Prairie, Minnesota, United States
- Died: December 21, 2018 (aged 91) Greenville, South Carolina, United States
- Denomination: Anglican
- Parents: Aaron Emmanuel Hultstrand & Selma Avendla Liljegren
- Spouse: Marjorie Ann Richter (m. 1948; died 2004) Lenorg Ann Haselwood (m. 2006)
- Children: 2
- Education: Macalester College; Bexley Hall

Donald Maynard Hultstrand (April 16, 1927 - December 21, 2018) was the ninth bishop of the Episcopal Diocese of Springfield.

== Early and family life ==
Born on April 16, 1927, in Parkers Prairie, Minnesota, to Aaron Hultstrand and his wife, Selma Liljegren Hultstrand. Hultstrand graduated from Macalester College in 1950 and Bexley Hall Seminary in 1953. He received a M.Div. from Bexley in 1972 and an honorary Doctor of Divinity degree from Nashotah House in 1986. He was a member of Pi Phi Epsilon.

He married Marjorie Ann Richter in June 1948.

== Ministry ==
He was ordained to the diaconate on June 14, 1953, by Bishop Hamilton Hyde Kellogg, and to the priesthood on December 19, 1953, by Bishop Stephen Keeler. He was consecrated on February 6, 1982, and served a decade as bishop of Springfield, Illinois.

Hulstrand served several churches in Minnesota—initially as a vicar at St. John's in Worthington and Trinity in Luverne before becoming the diocesan youth advisor (1955–57) then rector in Wabasha (1957–61) and an instructor at the Brent School in Minneapolis (1961–62) and rector of St. Paul in Duluth (1969–75). He also served as rector of St. Mark's in Canton 1962–68, and was an honorary canon at Trinity Cathedral in Cleveland (1966–69), then accepted a call as an Associate at St. Andrews in Kansas City, Missouri 1(968-69). Immediately before his episcopate, Hulstrand was rector in Greeley, Colorado (1979-1982). He was Executive Director of the Anglican Fellowship of Prayer and President of the Living Church foundation beginning in 1992. Before his episcopate, Hultstrand received the Distinguished Service award from Young Life Minnesota (1974), and served on the board directors for Senior Citizens Housing in Duluth (1972—1975) and for St. Luke's Hospital in Duluth (1969—1975). He was the president of the Low-Rent Housing Project in Greeley (1979—1982).

His published books and cassettes include: God Shall Wipe Away All Tears, Revelations of Effective Prayer, Life in the Spirit, Holy Living Today and The Praying Church.

In retirement, he was affiliated with Christ Episcopal Church in Greenville, South Carolina.

== See also ==
- List of bishops of the Episcopal Church in the United States of America
- List of Macalester College people
