= Richard T. Loring =

American prelate

The Right Reverend Richard Tuttle Loring D.D.
- Bishop of Springfield
- Church: Episcopal Church
- Diocese: Springfield
- Elected: June 9, 1947
- In office: 1947–1948
- Predecessor: John Chanler White
- Successor: Charles A. Clough

Orders
- Ordination: June 1929 by Charles Lewis Slattery
- Consecration: October 18, 1947 by Henry Knox Sherrill

Personal details
- Born: February 7, 1900 Newton, Massachusetts, United States
- Died: April 16, 1948 (aged 48) Springfield, Illinois, United States
- Buried: St Paul's Cathedral
- Denomination: Anglican
- Parents: Richard Tuttle Loring & Mary Amory Leland
- Spouse: Helen Dexter (m. 1928)
- Education: Harvard College

Richard Tuttle Loring Jr. (February 7, 1900 - April 16, 1948) was an American prelate of the Episcopal Church, who served as the fifth Bishop of Springfield from 1947, till his sudden death in 1948.

== Early life and education ==
Loring was born on February 7, 1900, in Newton, Massachusetts, to the Reverend Richard Tuttle Loring and Mary Amory Leland. His brother was Oliver Leland Loring, who became Bishop of Maine. He was educated at the Allen Military School in West Newton, Massachusetts, and then at Harvard College, graduating in 1924 with a Bachelor of Arts. He then commenced studies at the Harvard Graduate School of Design, where he studied for a little over two years, before shifting his studies to a theological focus at the Episcopal Theological School in Cambridge, Massachusetts. He graduated in 1929 with a Bachelor of Divinity.

== Ordained ministry ==
Loring was ordained deacon in December 1928, and priest in June 1929, by Bishop Charles Lewis Slattery of Massachusetts. He served at Trinity Church in Concord, Massachusetts, between 1926 and 1929. He then became rector of the Church of the Good Shepherd in Waban, Massachusetts, in 1929, serving through 1937, when he became rector of St David's Church in Baltimore.

== Bishop ==
Loring was elected Bishop of Springfield at a special Synod on June 9, 1947. He was consecrated on October 18, 1947, at St Paul's Cathedral, by Presiding Bishop Henry Knox Sherrill. Soon afterwards, he embarked on a visitation of the upper portion of his Diocese. Loring died suddenly less than a year after his consecration, of a coronary thrombosis on April 16, 1948.
