= Edward C. Chalfant =

American bishop

The Right Reverend Edward C. Chalfant D.D.
- Bishop of Maine
- Church: Episcopal Church
- Diocese: Maine
- In office: 1986–1996
- Predecessor: Frederick Wolf
- Successor: Chilton R. Knudsen
- Previous post: Coadjutor Bishop of Maine (1984-1986)

Orders
- Ordination: 1963
- Consecration: September 21, 1984 by John Allin

Personal details
- Born: August 14, 1937 Pittsburgh, Pennsylvania, U.S.
- Died: January 24, 2023 (aged 85)
- Denomination: Anglican
- Parents: Edward Trimble Chalfant (1908-1951) and Helen Louise Cole (1908-1981)
- Spouse: Marydee Wimbish
- Children: 2
- Education: Wesleyan University

Edward Cole Chalfant (August 14, 1937 – January 24, 2023) was an American bishop of the Episcopal Diocese of Maine from 1986 to 1996.

== Biography ==
Chalfant was born in Pittsburgh, Pennsylvania, in 1937. He was a graduate of Wesleyan University and the Virginia Theological Seminary. In 1959, Chalfant married Marydee Wimbish. He was ordained in 1963 and served parishes in Clearwater, Florida first as associate rector of Ascension Church and then from 1967, as rector of St John's Church. He was called to Southern Ohio in 1972 to be rector of St. Mark's Church in Columbus, Ohio. He also served as a deputy to General Convention and held numerous diocesan posts.

Chalfant died on January 24, 2023, at the age of 85.

== Bishop ==
In 1984 he was one of five priests nominated for the post of Coadjutor Bishop of Maine. He was elected in the 4th ballot on April 13, 1984. He succeeded Bishop Wolf in 1986.

== Resignation ==
In April 1996 it became known that Bishop Chalfant was involved in an extra-marital affair. He resigned his seat as Bishop of Maine on May 6 that same year upon the recommendation of the Presiding Bishop and standing committee of the diocese.
