= Brian Burgess =

Brian Burgess may refer to:

- Brian Burgess (athlete) (born 1957), Scottish high jumper
- Brian K. Burgess (born 1960), American priest
- Brian L. Burgess (born 1951), American judge

== See also ==
- Bryan Burgess (born 1977), Canadian curler
