= Cathedral Church of St. Luke =

Cathedral Church of St. Luke may refer to:

- Cathedral Church of St. Luke (Orlando, Florida)
- Cathedral Church of St. Luke (Portland, Maine)
