= Frederick Wolf =

Bishop in the Episcopal Church USA

The Right Reverend Frederick Wolf S.T.D., LL.D., D.D., J.U.D.
- Bishop of Maine
- Church: Episcopal Church
- Diocese: Maine
- Elected: June 14, 1968
- In office: 1968–1986
- Predecessor: Oliver Leland Loring
- Successor: Edward C. Chalfant

Orders
- Ordination: May 30, 1946 by Wallace E. Conkling
- Consecration: October 4, 1968 by John E. Hines

Personal details
- Born: April 12, 1922 Cedar Rapids, Iowa, United States
- Died: January 5, 1999 (aged 76) Portland, Maine, United States
- Buried: Cathedral Church of St. Luke (Portland, Maine)
- Denomination: Anglican
- Parents: Frederick Barton Wolf & Emily Julietta Reynolds
- Spouse: Barbara Buckley
- Children: 3
- Education: Grinnell College

Frederick Barton Wolf (April 12, 1922 – January 5, 1999) was bishop of the Episcopal Diocese of Maine from 1968 to 1986.

== Early years and priesthood ==
Wolf was born in Cedar Rapids, Iowa. He graduated from Grinnell College and Seabury-Western Theological Seminary. He was ordained deacon in 1945, priest in 1946. He served as priest-in-charge of Holy Trinity Church in Belvidere, Illinois from 1946 till 1950 and Rector of St Christopher Church from 1950 till 1954 when he was appointed Dean of St John's Cathedral in Quincy, Illinois. He was also associate secretary for leadership training in the department of Christian education for the Executive Council from 1957 till 1959. In 1959 he became Rector of St Peter's in Bennington, Vermont. While in Bennington, he was closely associated with the Parish Training Program of the Province of New England, a summer field work program for seminarians. He was also president of the standing committee of the Diocese of Vermont, a member of the Diocesan Council and a delegate to the Vermont Church Council. He also served as a deputy to General Convention and is a consultant to the convention's Liturgical Commission.

== Episcopacy ==
On June 14, 1968, Wolf was elected Bishop of Maine on the 13th ballot. He was consecrated on October 4, 1968, in the Cathedral of St. Luke in Portland. The co-consecrators were Walter H. Gray, Bishop of Connecticut, and John Seville Higgins, Bishop of Rhode Island.

== Family ==
Wolf married Barbara Buckley and had three daughters.
