= Stephen T. Lane =

The Right Reverend Stephen Taylor Lane
- Bishop of Maine
- Church: Episcopal Church
- Diocese: Maine
- In office: 2008–2019
- Predecessor: Chilton R. Knudsen
- Successor: Thomas J. Brown
- Previous post: Coadjutor Bishop of Maine (2008)

Orders
- Ordination: 1978
- Consecration: May 3, 2008 by Katharine Jefferts Schori

Personal details
- Born: 1949 (age 76–77) LeRoy, New York, US
- Denomination: Anglican
- Spouse: The Rev. Maria Hoecker Lane (m. 2024) Gretchen Farnum Lane (d. 2020)
- Children: 3

Stephen Taylor Lane was the ninth Bishop of the Episcopal Diocese of Maine in The Episcopal Church. He previously served as Bishop Co-adjutor of Maine.

Lane was ordained in 1978, and served as the canon for deployment and ministry development in the Diocese of Rochester prior to his consecration. He retired as Bishop of Maine in June 2019, and was succeeded by Thomas James Brown.

== See also ==
- List of Episcopal bishops of the United States
- Historical list of the Episcopal bishops of the United States
