= Christ Episcopal Church, Woodbury, New Jersey =

Christ Episcopal Church
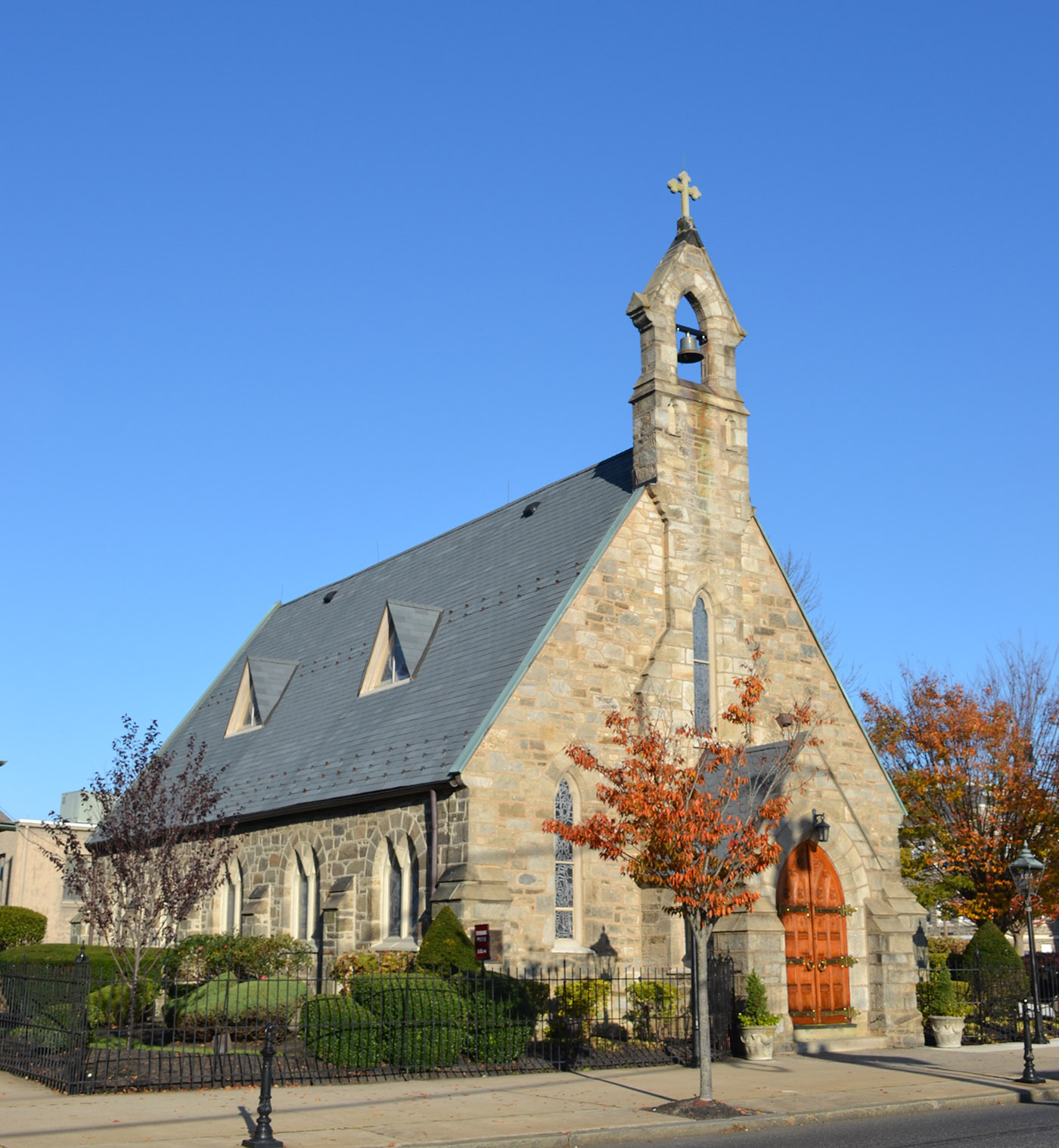
- Christ Episcopal Church
- 39°50′21.7″N 75°9′17.2″W
- Location: Woodbury, New Jersey
- Country: United States
- Denomination: Episcopal
- Churchmanship: Tractarian / Anglo-Catholic
- Website: christchurch.woodburynj.org

History
- Status: Church
- Founder: The Rev. W.H. Norris
- Dedication: 1856
- Consecrated: September 17, 1857

Architecture
- Functional status: Active
- Groundbreaking: July 1855
- Completed: 1856

Administration
- Province: Province II
- Diocese: New Jersey

Clergy
- Bishop: Sally French

Christ Episcopal Church is an Anglo-Catholic Episcopal church in Woodbury, New Jersey. Founded in 1854, the parish is part of the Episcopal Diocese of New Jersey and a member of the Anglican Communion. The church reported 870 members in 2019 and 243 members in 2025. Plate and pledge income reported for the congregation in 2025 was $259,061 with average Sunday attendance (ASA) of 107 persons. This was a relative increase on ASA of 208 reported in 2020.

The parish was established by the first rector, the Reverend William Herbert Norris, at the direction of Bishop George Washington Doane; the church building was finished in 1856 and consecrated September 17, 1857. In 1911, a fire in the undercroft of the church nearly caused the loss of the building; during the fire the women of the church rescued the altar cloth, bible, and bishop's chair. The bishop's chair is still used for visiting bishops today.

The adjoining parish house was renovated in 2018. In addition to serving as the assembly room for coffee hours and parish meetings, in the 1930s and 1940s it also served as the performance space for the Woodbury Sketch Club.

The church's pipe organ is M. P. Moller Opus 10523 (1969c) with eight ranks and two manuals. The previous installation was Hook & Hastings Opus 1747 (1897) with two manuals and 17 registers. The building includes stained glass by installed over two centuries from English and American workshops, with notable work by Paula Himmelsbach Balano (1877–1967), a German-American church artist working in a medium uncommon for women at the time of her installations. The sanctuary is designed to accommodate ad orientem liturgical celebration.

== Clergy ==
1. The Rev. William Herbert Norris
2. The Rev. William E. Lewis
3. The Rev. George M. Bond
4. The Rev. Howard E. Thompson
5. The Rev. Abram L. Urban
6. The Rev. Malcolm Taylor
7. The Rev. James O. McIlhenny
8. The Rev. Edgar Campbell
9. The Rev. Howard M. Stuckert
10. The Rev. Robert G. W. Williams
11. The Rev. The Rev. William V. Rauscher, Jr.
12. The Rev. Douglas E. Anderson
13. The Rev. Brian K. Burgess, later Bishop of the Episcopal Diocese of Springfield, Illinois
14. The Rev. John D. Alexander (interim)
15. The Rev. Lawrence J. Civale
