= Horatio Southgate =

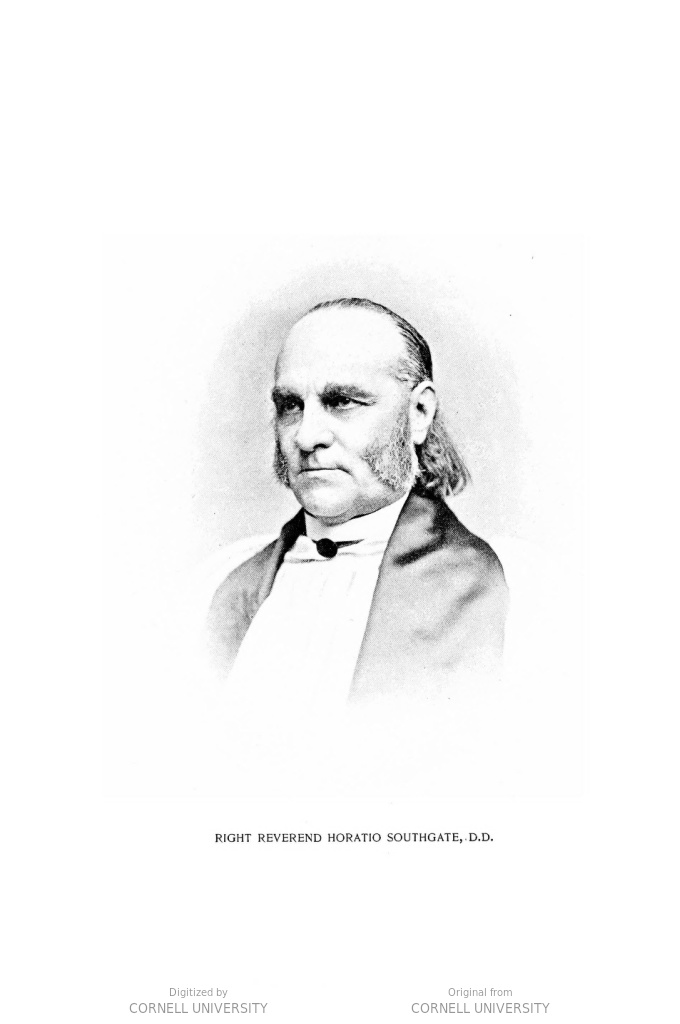
The Rt. Rev. Horatio Southgate

Horatio Southgate (July 5, 1812 – April 11, 1894) was born in Portland, Maine, and studied for the ordained ministry at Andover Theological Seminary as a Congregationalist. In 1834 he became a member of the Episcopal Church in the United States of America, and was subsequently ordained to the diaconate in 1835. He was ordained to the priesthood in 1839 after an unusually long period as a deacon in this period of Anglican history, and also completed post-graduate studies at Columbia College, earning a Doctorate of Divinity degree in 1845.

Southgate was consecrated as a missionary bishop "for the dominions and dependencies of the Sultan" (i.e., the Ottoman Empire) on October 26, 1844, following on several years of travels in what are now Turkey, Iran, Iraq and other parts of the Middle East. His contacts with Jacobite, Nestorian, Assyrian and other Christian communities in this region marked significant early relations with the American Protestant Episcopal Church. He was accompanied by other clergy of the Episcopal Church, including Samuel Penny, and engaged in controversy with other Anglo-American missionary groups in the region. This notably centred on the standing (orthodoxy, validity of orders, etc.) of the historic churches in the region to which the Presbyterian missionaries were less sympathetic.

He returned to the United States with his young family in 1849, but his first wife died in 1850. Southgate served as rector of Saint Luke's Church, Portland, Maine (1850–1851); the Church of the Advent, Boston (1852–1858); and Zion Church, New York City (1858–1872). He remarried in 1864, to Sarah Elizabeth Hutchinson of New York City, who survived him, as did 9 of his 13 children. Southgate also lived in Falls Church, Virginia, and Ravenswood, Queens, where he served at St. Thomas Church.

Southgate died of typhoid malaria in Astoria, Queens. His son donated his papers to the Berkeley Divinity School, where they remain accessible through the Yale University Library. The University of Virginia has his autobiography.

== Bibliography ==
- Narrative of a Tour through Armenia, Kurdistan, Persia, and Mesopotamia (two volumes, New York, 1840)
- Narrative of a Visit to the Syrian (Jacobite) Church of Mesopotamia (1844)
- A Treatise on the Antiquity, Doctrine, Ministry, and Worship of the Anglican Church (In Greek, Constantinople, 1849)
- Practical Directions for the Observance of Lent (New York, 1850)
- The War in the East (London, 1855)
- Parochial Sermons (1859)
- The Cross above the Crescent, a Romance of Constantinople (Philadelphia, 1877)
