= Dan Martins =

American Anglican bishop (born 1951)

The Right Reverend Dan Martins
- Bishop of Springfield
- Martins at Nashotah House in 2019
- Church: Episcopal Church
- Diocese: Springfield
- Elected: September 18, 2010
- In office: 2011–2021
- Predecessor: Peter Beckwith
- Successor: Brian K. Burgess

Orders
- Ordination: December 20, 1989 by James Brown
- Consecration: March 19, 2011 by Katharine Jefferts Schori

Personal details
- Born: Daniel Hayden Martins; 1951 (age 74–75) Rio de Janeiro, Brazil
- Denomination: Anglican
- Spouse: Brenda F. Martins (m. 1972)
- Children: 3

Daniel Hayden Martins (born 1951) is an American Anglican bishop. He is the eleventh and former bishop of the Episcopal Diocese of Springfield. He was consecrated to the episcopate on March 19, 2011. In October 2019, he announced plans to retire. He was succeeded by Brian K. Burgess as the twelfth Bishop of Springfield in 2022.

== Biography ==
Martins was born in Rio de Janeiro, Brazil, but was raised in Chicago. He attended Westmont College in Santa Barbara, California, and graduated in 1973 with a Bachelor of Music. He later studied at the University of California, Santa Barbara, earning a Master of Arts in Music History in 1975. He then attended Nashotah House, graduating with a Master of Divinity in 1989. He was awarded a Doctor of Divinity in 2011, by Nashotah House.

Martins was ordained a deacon on June 18, 1989, and a priest on December 20, 1989. He served as curate and chaplain at St Luke's School in Baton Rouge, Louisiana from 1989 till 1991, and then as vicar of St. Margaret's Church in Baton Rouge, Louisiana between 1991 and 1994. Between 1994 and 2007, he was rector of St. John the Evangelist Church in Stockton, California, and then rector of St. Anne's Church in Warsaw, Indiana between 2007 and 2011.

On September 18, 2010, Martins was elected on the third ballot as the Bishop of Springfield, and was consecrated on March 19, 2011, in the Springfield First United Methodist Church, with Presiding Bishop Katharine Jefferts Schori as chief consecrator.

== Views ==
Martins is a member of Communion Partners which opposed the 77th General Convention's decision to authorize the blessing of same-sex marriages in 2012. He serves as a trustee of the American Region of the Society of King Charles the Martyr and as Superior-General of the Confraternity of the Blessed Sacrament.

== See also ==
- List of Episcopal bishops of the United States
- Historical list of the Episcopal bishops of the United States
