= Granville Hudson Sherwood =

American bishop

The Right Reverend Granville Hudson Sherwood
- Bishop of Springfield
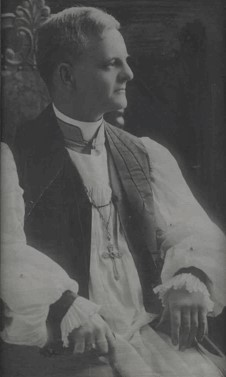
- Church: Episcopal Church
- Diocese: Springfield
- Elected: December 27, 1916
- In office: 1917–1923
- Predecessor: Edward William Osborne
- Successor: John Chanler White

Orders
- Ordination: December 1903 by Charles P. Anderson
- Consecration: April 25, 1917 by Daniel S. Tuttle

Personal details
- Born: December 8, 1878 Elgin, Illinois, United States
- Died: November 22, 1923 (aged 44) Springfield, Illinois, United States
- Buried: Chippiannock Cemetery
- Denomination: Anglican
- Spouse: Lucy Galt Kinney (m. 1902)
- Education: Trinity College

Granville Hudson Sherwood (December 8, 1878 - November 22, 1923) was the third bishop of the Episcopal Diocese of Springfield.

== Early life and education ==
Sherwood was born on December 8, 1878, in Elgin, Illinois, to David Burton Sherwood (1849-1908) and Philura "Lura" Comstock Sherwood (1846-1897). He attended St Paul's School in Concord, New Hampshire, graduating in 1896. He then studied at Trinity College, graduating with a Bachelor of Arts in 1898, and at the University of Chicago, graduating with postgraduate studies in 1899. Sherwood trained for the ordained ministry at the Western Theological Seminary, and graduated in 1903. He married Lucy Galt Kinney on September 10, 1902.

== Ordained ministry ==
Sherwood was ordained deacon in June 1903, and priest in December 1903, by Bishop Charles P. Anderson of Chicago. He served as rector of Christ Church in Streator, Illinois between 1903 and 1905, and rector of Trinity Church in Rock Island, Illinois between 1905 and 1917. He was also President of the Standing Committee of the Diocese of Quincy and Deputy to the General Convention between 1907 and 1916.

== Bishop ==
Sherwood was elected Bishop of Springfield on December 27, 1916. He was consecrated on April 25, 1917 with Presiding Bishop Daniel S. Tuttle as chief consecrator. He remained in office till his death in 1923.

== See also ==
- List of bishops of the Episcopal Church in the United States of America
