= Oliver Leland Loring =

American bishop

The Right Reverend Oliver Leland Loring D.D.
- Bishop of Maine
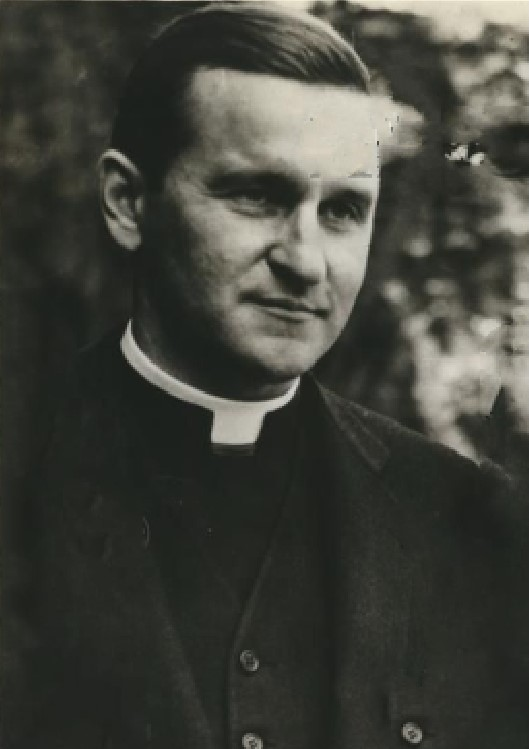
- Church: Episcopal Church
- Diocese: Maine
- Elected: February 5, 1941
- In office: 1941–1968
- Predecessor: Benjamin Brewster
- Successor: Frederick Wolf

Orders
- Ordination: May 1931 by Henry Knox Sherrill
- Consecration: May 13, 1941 by Henry St. George Tucker

Personal details
- Born: January 5, 1904 Newtonville, Massachusetts, United States
- Died: November 3, 1979 (aged 75) Weymouth, Massachusetts, United States
- Buried: South Dartmouth Cemetery, Dartmouth
- Denomination: Anglican
- Parents: Richard T. Loring & Mary Amory Leland
- Spouse: Elizabeth Brewster
- Children: 3
- Education: Harvard University

Oliver Leland Loring (January 5, 1904 - November 3, 1979) was bishop of the Episcopal Diocese of Maine, serving from 1941 to 1968.

== Biography ==
Oliver Leland Loring was born in Newtonville, Massachusetts, the son of the Reverend Richard Tuttle Loring and Mary Leland Loring. His brother was Richard T. Loring, who became Bishop of Springfield in 1947. He was a graduate of Harvard University and the Episcopal Theological School and held honorary doctoral degrees from Bowdoin College and the General Theological Seminary. Loring was ordained deacon in May, 1930 by the Bishop Julius W. Atwood and priest in May 1931 by Henry Knox Sherrill of Massachusetts. He served parishes in New Bedford and Dorchester, Massachusetts.

He was consecrated bishop of Maine in 1941. Bishop Loring was active in diocesan matters, especially youth and Christian education work. He carried this interest into his episcopate and was a key factor in the development of the diocesan camps and conferences. He was a trustee of the General Seminary and served as the Province I representative to the National (Executive) Council. On February 11, 1935, he married Elizabeth Brewster. They had three children.

In May 1968, Loring resigned as bishop due to poor health.
