= Chilton R. Knudsen =

American bishop

The Right Reverend Chilton R. Knudsen
- Assistant Bishop of Chicago
- Church: Episcopal Church
- Diocese: Chicago
- Installed: 2021
- Other posts: VIII Bishop of Maine; Interim Bishop of Lexington; Assistant Bishop of New York; Assistant Bishop of Long Island; Assisting Bishop of Maryland; Assisting Bishop of Washington
- Previous post: Assistant Bishop of Washington

Orders
- Ordination: February 24, 1981 by James W. Montgomery
- Consecration: March 28, 1998 by Frank T. Griswold

Personal details
- Born: Chilton Abbie Richardson; September 29, 1946 (age 80)
- Denomination: Anglican
- Spouse: Michael J. Knudsen (d. 2021)
- Children: 1
- Education: Chatham College; Seabury-Western Theological Seminary

Chilton Abbie Richardson Knudsen (born September 29, 1946) is a bishop of the Episcopal Church. Knudsen served as the diocesan bishop of Maine for a decade (1997–2008). Upon retiring from that position, she then served as interim bishop in the Diocese of Lexington (2011–2012) and as assistant bishop in the Diocese of New York (2013–2014), and the Diocese of Long Island (2014–2015). In May 2015, she began serving as assistant bishop in the Diocese of Maryland. On December 6, 2018, Knudsen announced her resignation from that temporary position after accepting a position as assisting bishop of the Episcopal Diocese of Washington as of February 20, 2019. In August 2021 she was appointed assisting bishop of the Episcopal Diocese of Chicago due to Bishop Paula Clark having to delay her consecration for health reasons.

== Early life and education ==
Knudsen is the eldest of four siblings. Growing up in a U.S. Navy family, she spent a large part of her childhood overseas, including Guam, Japan, and the Philippines. She studied biology and ecology at Chatham College in Pittsburgh, Pennsylvania, and graduated with a Bachelor of Arts degree in 1968. She then attended the University of Pittsburgh for graduate studies and taught at her alma mater. Knudsen then taught in a nursing program at a community college and worked as a counselor at women's health clinics in Pennsylvania and Illinois.

== Ministry ==
As a young woman, Knudsen felt a calling to the priesthood, but at that time the Episcopal Church was not ordaining women. Following the decision of the church to ordain women, Knudsen attended Seabury-Western Theological Seminary in Illinois, earning an M. Div. Degree in 1980. She was ordained a deacon on June 9, 1980, and ordained to the priesthood on February 24, 1981. She first served in Bolingbrook, Illinois, working to establish a new mission there. She later worked as Pastoral Care Officer/Canon for Pastoral Care in the Diocese of Chicago.

Knudsen was elected the 8th Bishop of Maine in 1997 and remained in that post until retiring in September 2008. Presiding bishop Frank T. Griswold, former Maine bishop Frederick Wolf, and bishop Geralyn Wolf of the Episcopal Diocese of Rhode Island were among the bishops consecrating Knudsen as the 938th bishop consecrated in the Episcopal Church. Following her retirement, she served as a missionary in Haiti, as well as interim bishop in Lexington, Kentucky and assisting bishop in the dioceses of New York and Long Island.

Following the resignation of Heather Cook as suffragan bishop to the Bishop of Maryland, the diocesan convention authorized diocesan bishop Eugene Sutton and the standing committee to hire an assisting bishop until a suffragan bishop could be nominated and elected. Following the convention, the diocese announced that Knudsen had been hired as assisting bishop. The choice was seen as bold in that, like Cook, Knudsen also struggled with alcohol addiction and is a recovering alcoholic. Knudsen became known for her expertise in conflict resolution and congregational development, as well as addiction and recovery, having worked as an addiction recovery counselor and also written two books.

Knudsen assumed her post as Maryland's assistant bishop in late 2015, expecting to serve for one to two and a half years until a suffragan bishop was named. In fact, her ministry in Maryland lasted three years before her "hail and farewell" notice (following Navy tradition) on December 6, 2018. Bishop Knudsen served the Episcopal Church as one of the trustees of the Church Pension Fund, as well as a delegate to several General Conventions. During the General Convention of the Episcopal Church in July 2018, Chilton announced the readmission of the Episcopal Diocese of Cuba.

On February 20, 2019, Knudsen began serving as the Assisting Bishop for the Episcopal Diocese of Washington.

== Personal life ==
Knudsen lived with her husband, retired computer scientist Michael J. Knudsen, in Catonsville, Maryland. Michael died on March 9, 2021. Their adult son lives in Portland, Maine.

== Bibliography ==
- (with Nancy Van Dyke Platt) So You Think You Don't Know One? Addiction and Recovery in Clergy and Congregations (Morehouse, 2010) ISBN 9780819224125
- contributor, A Space for Grace: Pathways from Brokenness to Beauty (2022) ISBN 9798848651843

== See also ==
- List of Episcopal bishops of the United States
- Historical list of the Episcopal bishops of the United States
