= Albert A. Chambers =

American Anglican bishop (1906–1993)

The Right Reverend Albert A. Chambers
- Bishop of Springfield
- Church: Anglican Catholic Church (prev. Episcopal Church)
- Diocese: Springfield
- In office: 1962–1972
- Predecessor: Charles A. Clough
- Successor: Albert Hillestad

Orders
- Ordination: February 1932 by Cameron Josiah Davis
- Consecration: October 1, 1962 by Arthur C. Lichtenberger

Personal details
- Born: June 22, 1906 Cleveland, Ohio, United States
- Died: June 18, 1993 (aged 86) Sun City, Florida, United States
- Spouse: Frances Hewette Davis; Janet Patrick Wilson
- Education: Hobart College, General Theological Seminary

Albert Arthur Chambers (June 22, 1906 – June 18, 1993) was the seventh bishop of the Episcopal Diocese of Springfield, serving from 1962 to 1972. He then retired in part because he opposed revising the Book of Common Prayer and ordaining women as priests, which would be expressly authorized by the General Convention in 1976.

Chambers ultimately left the Anglican Communion and acted, briefly, as primate of the Anglican Church in North America (Episcopal), later renamed the Anglican Catholic Church.

== Early and family life ==
Chambers was born in Cleveland, Ohio to Arthur Samuel Chambers and his wife, the former Eleanor Jenny Terbrack. He had at least one sister, who ultimately survived him. Educated at Hobart College, he received his B.A. in 1928, then prepared for ordination at the General Theological Seminary in New York, from which he graduated in 1932. He later received honoris causa Divinity degrees from Hobart in 1957, GTS in 1961 and Nashotah House in 1963.

He married the former Frances Hewette Davis in June 1934, and they raised two daughters (Sally and Fran) before her death in 1976. He remarried to Janet Snyder Wilson in April 1978; she also predeceased him.

== Ministry ==
Made a deacon by Bishop Ferris in May 1931, Chambers was ordained a priest by Bishop Davis in February 1932. Early in the Great Depression, Chambers served as a missionary curate in four rural New York parishes (St. John Dunkirk, New York), St. Peter in Chains Angola, New York, St. Andrew in Irving, New York and St. Peter in Forestville, New York, before becoming a canon at St. Paul's Cathedral, in Buffalo, New York (1933-1936). He then accepted a position as rector of St. Thomas Church in Neenah-Menasha, Wisconsin (1936–42), and left that position to become rector of St. Peter's Church in Auburn, New York (1942-1949). Chambers served as rector of the Church of the Resurrection in Manhattan, New York for 13 years (1949-1962). In New York, he became involved in larger church affairs as a deputy to the General Convention in 1946, to the National Council of Churches (1954–57) and later on the New York diocese's standing committee and its president in 1961. He was runner-up in elections for assistant bishop in the New York and Long Island dioceses.

In 1962, Chambers was selected as bishop of Springfield, Illinois, and served a decade (1962-1972) until retiring, moving to Dennis, Massachusetts.

Chambers objected to the ordination of women, which the Episcopal Church approved at its General Convention in 1976. Disregarding this new policy, the retired bishop secretly entered dioceses to perform confirmations at parishes that likewise opposed the ordination of women, without the consent of the current diocesan bishop (who would normally perform such confirmations despite the congregation's protests of other matters). The House of Bishops chastised him in 1977. Undeterred, Chambers went on to help found the Continuing Anglican movement, consecrating four breakaway bishops in Denver on January 28, 1978, in conjunction with Bishop Francisco J. Pagtakhan of the Philippine Independent Church, but without the consent of the Episcopal bishop of Colorado, William C. Frey. He became episcopal visitor of the created Diocese of the Holy Trinity, which encompassed breakaway parishes in California, Nevada and Colorado and of the Diocese of the Southeast.

== Death and legacy ==
Bishop Chambers ultimately retired to Florida by 1983. He survived two wives, and his daughter said he ultimately softened his stand regarding the ordination of women. He died in a hospital in Sun City Center, Florida, survived by his daughters and grandchildren.
