= Peter Beckwith =

American Anglican bishop (1939–2019)

Peter Hess Beckwith (September 8, 1939 – October 4, 2019) was an American Anglican bishop.

Beckwith graduated from Hillsdale College in 1961 and was a member of the Delta Tau Delta fraternity. He served as College Chaplain from 2010 to 2016, and as Chaplain Emeritus of Hillsdale College. Prior to that as bishop of the Anglican Church in North America and as a naval chaplain, rising to the rank of Rear Admiral in the reserves.

Beckwith was the tenth bishop of the Episcopal Diocese of Springfield, serving from 1992 to 2010. A theological conservative, he left the Episcopal Church afterwards. He was received as a member of the House of Bishops of the Anglican Church in North America at their College of the Bishops meeting, at October 10, 2014, in Atlanta, Georgia. He served after that as assisting bishop of the Anglican Diocese of the Great Lakes.

Beckwith had a wife, Melinda, with whom he had two sons, Peter Jr. and Michael. He died on October 4, 2019.

Anglican Communion titles
Preceded by Donald M. Hultstrand	X Bishop of Springfield; 1992–2010	Succeeded by Daniel Hayden Martins
