= Samuel Penny =

Samuel Penny (1808-1853) was an American Episcopal clergyman. Born to Presbyterian parents in New York, he attended Lane Theological Seminary before joining the Episcopal Church in the United States of America. A graduate of Columbia University and the General Theological Seminary of the Episcopal Church, Penny was ordained to the diaconate and priesthood in 1838. He served most of his ordained ministry in charge of Emmanuel Church, Manville, Rhode Island, leaving briefly to accompany Bishop Horatio Southgate on a missionary journey to the Ottoman Empire.
