= Charles A. Clough =

Sixth Bishop of Springfield

The Right Reverend Charles Asa Clough D.D.
- Bishop of Springfield
- Church: Episcopal Church
- Diocese: Springfield
- Elected: May 26, 1948
- In office: 1948–1961
- Predecessor: Richard T. Loring
- Successor: Albert A. Chambers

Orders
- Ordination: December 1929 by Charles Lewis Slattery
- Consecration: September 21, 1948 by Benjamin F. P. Ivins

Personal details
- Born: April 8, 1903 Vineyard Haven, Massachusetts, United States
- Died: September 9, 1961 (aged 58) Springfield, Illinois, United States
- Buried: Vineyard Haven, Massachusetts
- Denomination: Anglican
- Parents: Charles Asa Clough & Jennie Spaulding Cromwell
- Education: Yale University

Charles Asa Clough Jr. (April 8, 1903 - September 9, 1961) was an American prelate of the Episcopal Church who served as the sixth Bishop of Springfield between 1948 and 1961.

== Early life and education ==
Clough was born in Vineyard Haven, Massachusetts on April 8, 1903, to Charles Asa Clough and Jennie Spaulding Cromwell. He was educated at Phillips Academy, and then at Yale University from where he earned a Bachelor of Arts in 1926. He then studied for his Master of Arts at the University of Cambridge, graduating in 1928, and for his Bachelor of Divinity at the Episcopal Theological School in Cambridge, Massachusetts, graduating in 1929. He was awarded a Doctor of Divinity by Nashotah House in 1948.

== Ordained ministry ==
Clough was ordained deacon in June 1929 and priest in December 1929 by Bishop Charles Lewis Slattery of Massachusetts. He served as assistant priest at Trinity Church in New York City between 1930 and 1942, and rector of St Mark's Church in Augusta, Maine between 1942 and 1948. He also served as a member of the diocesan council, board of examining chaplains, and vice-president of the department of Christian social relations. He also served twice as deputy to the General Convention, in 1943 and 1946.

== Bishop ==
Clough was elected Bishop of Springfield on May 26, 1948, after the sudden and untimely death of Bishop Richard T. Loring a month earlier. He was then consecrated on September 21, 1948, in St Paul's Cathedral by Bishop Benjamin F. P. Ivins of Milwaukee. During his episcopate, he established a summer camp site for young people, re-opened various missions that had been closed, and increased the role of lay people in parishes. Clough died in office as a result of Hodgkin lymphoma, on September 9, 1961.
