= Heather Cook =

American Episcopal priest

- Former Suffragan Bishop of Maryland
- Church: Episcopal Church
- Diocese: Diocese of Maryland
- In office: September 6, 2014 – May 1, 2015 (deposed)
- Successor: Chilton R. Knudsen

Orders
- Ordination: 1987
- Consecration: September 6, 2014 (deposed May 1, 2015) by Katharine Jefferts Schori

Personal details
- Born: September 21, 1956 (age 69) Syracuse, New York, United States

Heather Elizabeth Cook (born September 21, 1956) is a deposed bishop of the Episcopal Church in the United States. She was a suffragan bishop in the Diocese of Maryland until her resignation from the position in 2015. In September 2015, she pleaded guilty to vehicular manslaughter, having killed Tom Palermo while driving under the influence of alcohol and fleeing the scene twice, and was sentenced a month later to seven years in prison. She was deposed from ministry and therefore unable to perform public ministry; however, her ordinations cannot be undone according to Anglican sacramental theology.

== Ordained ministry ==
In 2014, Cook was the first woman elected by the diocese to become a bishop and she was consecrated as suffragan to Eugene Sutton. Cook was one of four finalists for the office of suffragan bishop and was elected on the fourth ballot. She was the 1,081st bishop consecrated in the Episcopal Church.

== Traffic fatality ==
Cook was placed on administrative leave at the end of 2014 after involvement in a traffic fatality in north Baltimore. She was charged with drunk driving, texting while driving, and leaving the scene of the crime, in addition to vehicular manslaughter in the death of cyclist Thomas Palermo. On January 22, 2015, the standing committee of the diocese requested that Cook resign her position. This was followed by the Presiding Bishop, Katharine Jefferts Schori, placing formal restrictions on Cook preventing her from presenting herself as an ordained minister of the Episcopal Church.

Cook was arraigned on more than a dozen charges—including manslaughter, DUI, and leaving the scene of an accident. At the arraignment hearing on April 2, 2015, she entered a plea of not guilty and a trial date was set for June 4, 2015.

On June 4, 2015, the trial was postponed to September 9, 2015.

On May 1, 2015, Katharine Jefferts Schori, the presiding bishop, announced that both she and the Diocese of Maryland had accepted Cook's resignation as a bishop and as an employee of the diocese. Moreover, it was announced that Cook and the church had reached an accord where Cook received a "sentence of deposition" which stripped her of her right to exercise any ordained ministry within the Episcopal Church. Following Cook's resignation Sutton and the standing committee named Chilton R. Knudsen as assistant bishop for the Diocese of Maryland.

On September 8, 2015, state prosecutors and Cook agreed to a plea bargain. Cook pleaded guilty and the prosecutors asked for a 20-year sentence (with 10 years suspended). On October 27, 2015, she was sentenced to seven years in prison, and was taken into custody immediately afterwards.

Cook requested early release in 2017. At a hearing on May 9, 2017, the parole board denied her request "in part because she 'took no responsibility' for her actions and displayed a 'lack of remorse.'" On May 14, 2019, after serving just over half of her seven-year sentence, Cook was released "from the Maryland Correctional Institute for Women in Jessup. She will be on supervised parole and probation for five years." She was released after applying for a sentence modification that "changed two of her sentences from consecutive to concurrent" and earning "sentence reductions for good behavior".
