= A. K. M. Adam =

American priest, scholar and theologian (born 1957)

- Adam in 2007
- Born: Andrew Keith Malcolm Adam; September 10, 1957 (age 69); Boston, Massachusetts, U.S.
- Occupations: Biblical scholar, theologian
- Title: Tutor in New Testament and Greek

Academic background
- Education: Duke University
- Thesis: New Testament Theology and the Problem of Modernity (1991)
- Doctoral advisor: Dan O. Via

Academic work
- Discipline: Biblical studies
- Sub-discipline: New Testament, Greek
- School or tradition: Episcopalian
- Institutions: University of Glasgow, St Stephen's House, Oxford

Andrew Keith Malcolm Adam (born September 10, 1957), known as A. K. M. Adam, is a biblical scholar, theologian, author, priest, technologist and blogger. He is Tutor in New Testament and Greek at St. Stephen's House located in Oxford. He is a writer, speaker, voice-over artist, and activist on topics including postmodern philosophy, hermeneutics, education, and the social constitution of meaning.

== Biography ==
Adam received a bachelor's degree from Bowdoin College (1979) majoring in philosophy. He earned an M.Div. (1986) and S.T.M. (1987) from Yale Divinity School and was ordained as an Episcopal priest. He received a Ph.D. in New Testament from Duke University in 1991, where he developed his thesis, "New Testament Theology and the Problem of Modernity" under Dan O. Via. After receiving his doctorate from Duke, he went to become assistant professor of religious studies at Eckerd College from 1991 to 1994. He was appointed assistant professor of New Testament at Princeton Theological Seminary, where he taught for five years (1994–1999). From 1999 to 2008, Adam was professor of New Testament at Seabury-Western Theological Seminary.

At the end of his time at Seabury, Adam completed a one-year appointment as visiting professor at Duke University in Durham, North Carolina. In 2009 he moved to Glasgow, Scotland, joining the staff of the University of Glasgow as lecturer in New Testament studies in September 2009; beginning in Michaelmas 2013, he joined the staff of St Stephen's House, Oxford, as tutor in New Testament, and Oriel College as college lecturer in theology.

Throughout his academic career, Adam has also served the Church as a priest, including the Parish of St. Luke's in Evanston, Illinois, and St. Mary's Cathedral, Glasgow.

== Projects and presentations ==
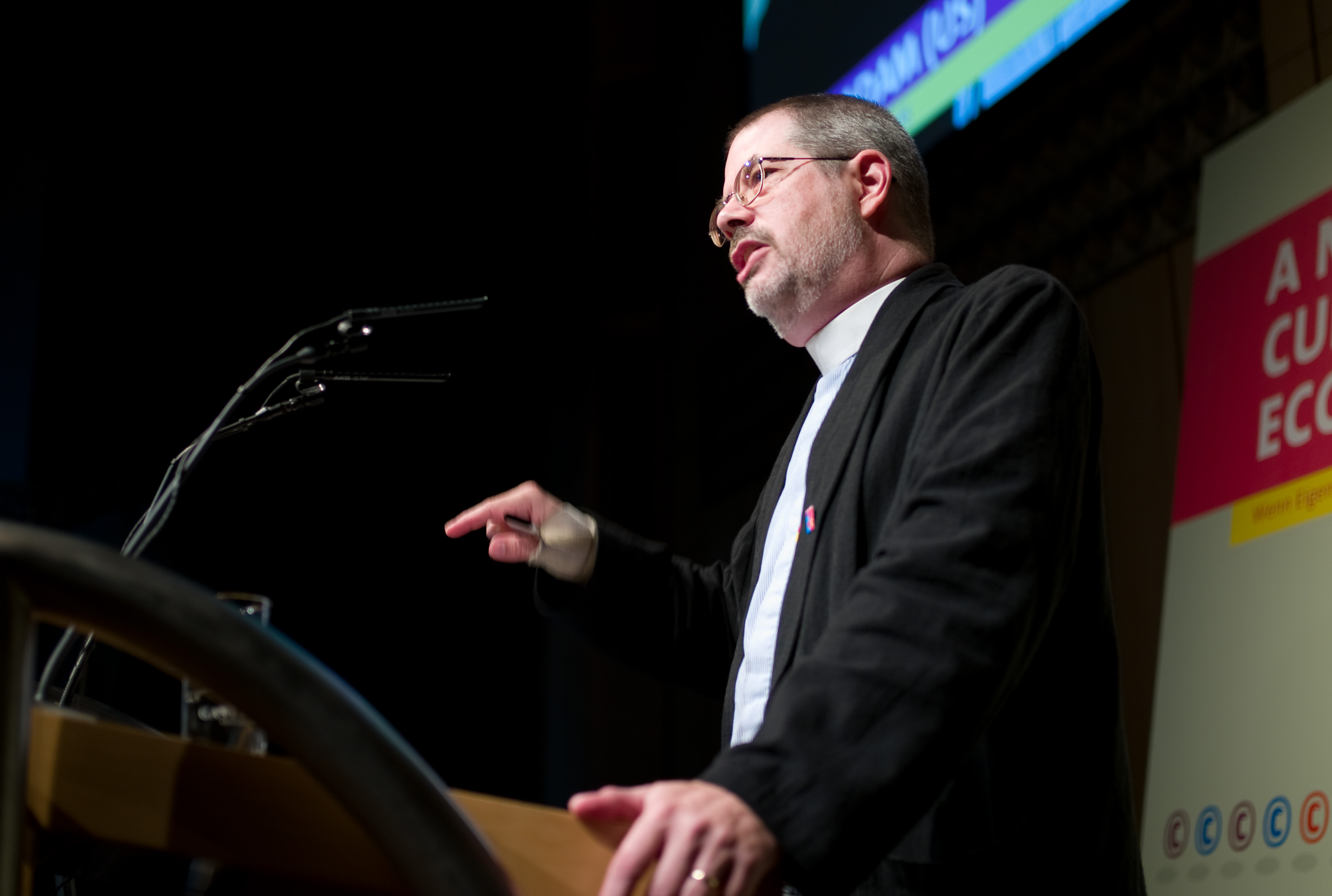
Adam in 2008 in Linz, Austria

At the Conference on Theology and Pedagogy, hosted at Garrett-Evangelical Theological Seminary in 2001, he presented "The Disseminary: What Theological Educators Need to Learn from Napster." In October 2003, he presented at BloggerCon on the topics of "Weblogs and Education," and "Weblogs and Spirituality," At Ars Electronica 2008 he presented "The Obscure Convergence of Theological Publishing and Technological Innovation".

== Works ==
Adam has published work on theology, hermeneutics, technology, philosophy, truth and meaning, Biblical interpretation, community, digital identity, digital rights, and collaborative spaces in education. His books to date have primarily been concerned with the postmodern implications of understanding and processing the text and meaning of the New Testament.

=== Thesis ===
- Adam, A. K. M. (1991). New Testament Theology and the Problem of Modernity (Ph.D.). Duke University.

=== Books ===
- ——— (1995). Making Sense of New Testament Theology. Macon, GA: Mercer University Press. ISBN 978-1-59752-041-6. OCLC 32746052.
- ——— (1995). What Is Postmodern Biblical Criticism?. Minneapolis, MO: Fortress Press. ISBN 978-0-8006-2879-6. OCLC 31969121.
- ——— (2001). Flesh and Bones: Sermons. Eugene, OR: Wipf and Stock. ISBN 978-1-57910-767-3. OCLC 57509008.
- ——— (2001). Postmodern Interpretations of the Bible: a reader. St. Louis, MO: Chalice Press. ISBN 978-0-8272-2970-9. OCLC 44777183.
- ——— (2006). Faithful Interpretation: reading the Bible in a postmodern world. Minneapolis, MO: Fortress Press. ISBN 978-0-8006-3787-3. OCLC 66392841.
- ——— (2013). James: A Handbook on the Greek Text. Waco, TX: Baylor University Press. ISBN 978-1602587595. OCLC 809989013..

=== As editor ===
- ———, ed. (2000). Handbook of Postmodern Biblical Interpretation. St. Louis, MO: Chalice Press. ISBN 978-0-8272-2971-6. OCLC 45575026.
- ———; Fowl, Stephen; Watson, Francis; Vanhoozer, Kevin, eds. (2006). Reading Scripture With the Church: toward a hermeneutic for theological interpretation. Grand Rapids, MI: Baker Academic. ISBN 978-0-8010-3173-1. OCLC 68192414.
- ———; Tongue, Samuel, eds. (2014). Looking Through a Glass Bible: Postdisciplinary Biblical Interpretations from the Glasgow School. Biblical Interpretation Series. Vol. 125. Leiden: Brill: 2014. ISBN 978-9004259072. OCLC 883374231.
