= Edward William Osborne =

American Episcopal bishop (1845–1926)

The Right Reverend Edward William Osborne SSJE
- Bishop of Springfield
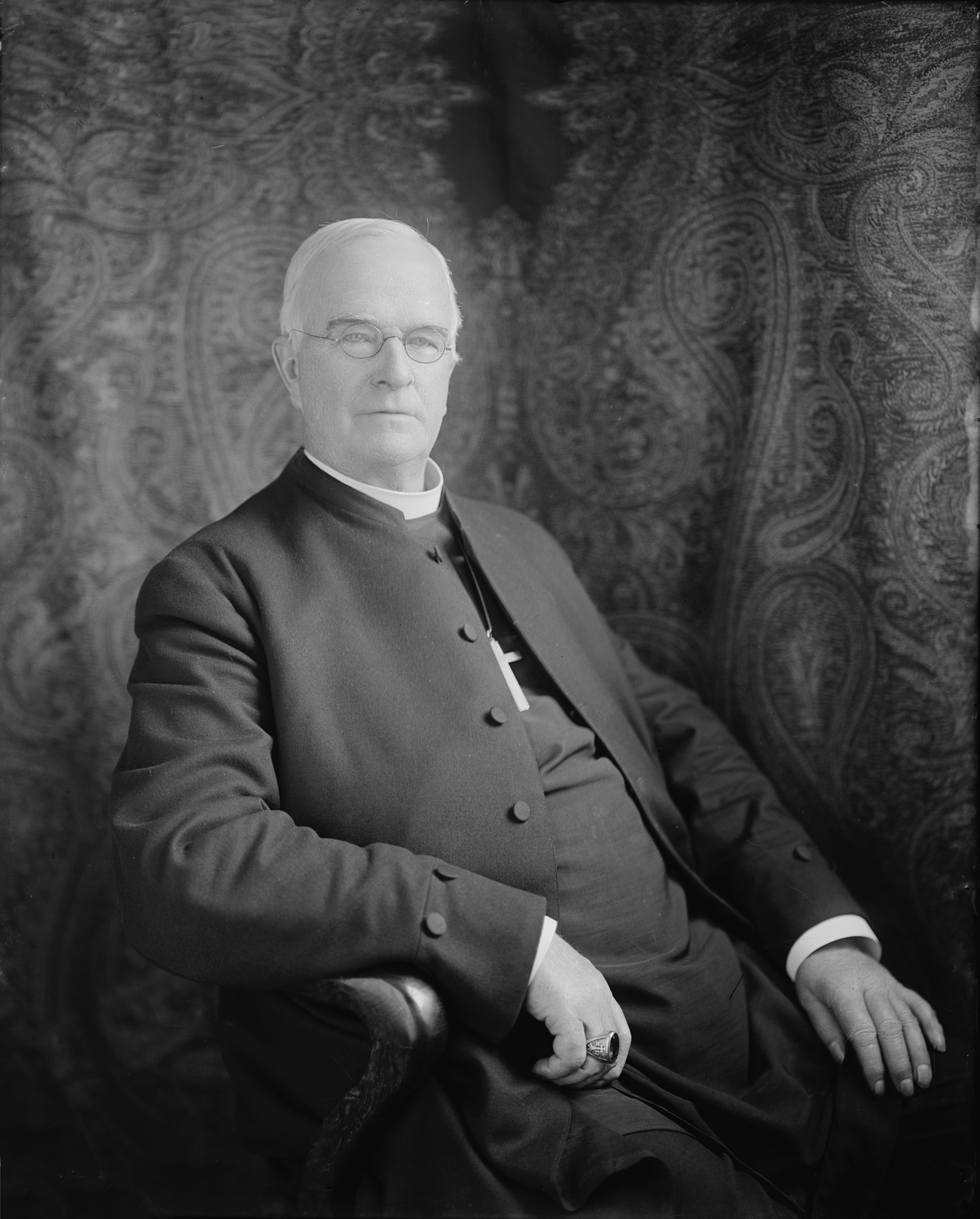
- Church: Episcopal Church
- Diocese: Springfield
- Elected: 1904
- In office: 1906–1916
- Predecessor: George Franklin Seymour
- Successor: Granville Hudson Sherwood
- Previous post: Coadjutor Bishop of Springfield (1904–1906)

Orders
- Ordination: 1870 by Charles Ellicott
- Consecration: October 23, 1904 by George Franklin Seymour

Personal details
- Born: January 5, 1845 Calcutta, India
- Died: July 5, 1926 (aged 81) San Diego, California, US
- Denomination: Anglican
- Parents: Francis Osborne; Louisa White
- Education: Worcester College, Oxford

Edward William Osborne SSJE (January 5, 1845 - July 5, 1926) was the second bishop of the Episcopal Diocese of Springfield.

== Biography ==
Edward William Osborne was born in Calcutta, India, on January 5, 1845, son of Francis Osborne and Louisa White. He was educated at Worcester College, Oxford, graduating in 1869. He was ordained deacon in 1869, and priest in 1870. He became curate of Highworth in 1869 and then of Kenn, Devon, in 1872. He then served as a priest of the Society of St. John the Evangelist in Boston from 1878 to 1904.

In 1904, Osborne was elected Coadjutor Bishop of Springfield, and was consecrated to the episcopate on October 23, 1904. He became diocesan bishop in 1906, and retiring as Bishop of Springfield in 1916. He died in San Diego, California.

== Bibliography ==
- The Children's Saviour
- The Saviour King
- The Children's Faith (Longmans, Green, and Co., 1894)

== See also ==
- List of bishops of the Episcopal Church in the United States of America
