= Cathedral Church of Saint Paul the Apostle (Springfield, Illinois) =

St Paul's Cathedral
- The Cathedral Church of Saint Paul the Apostle
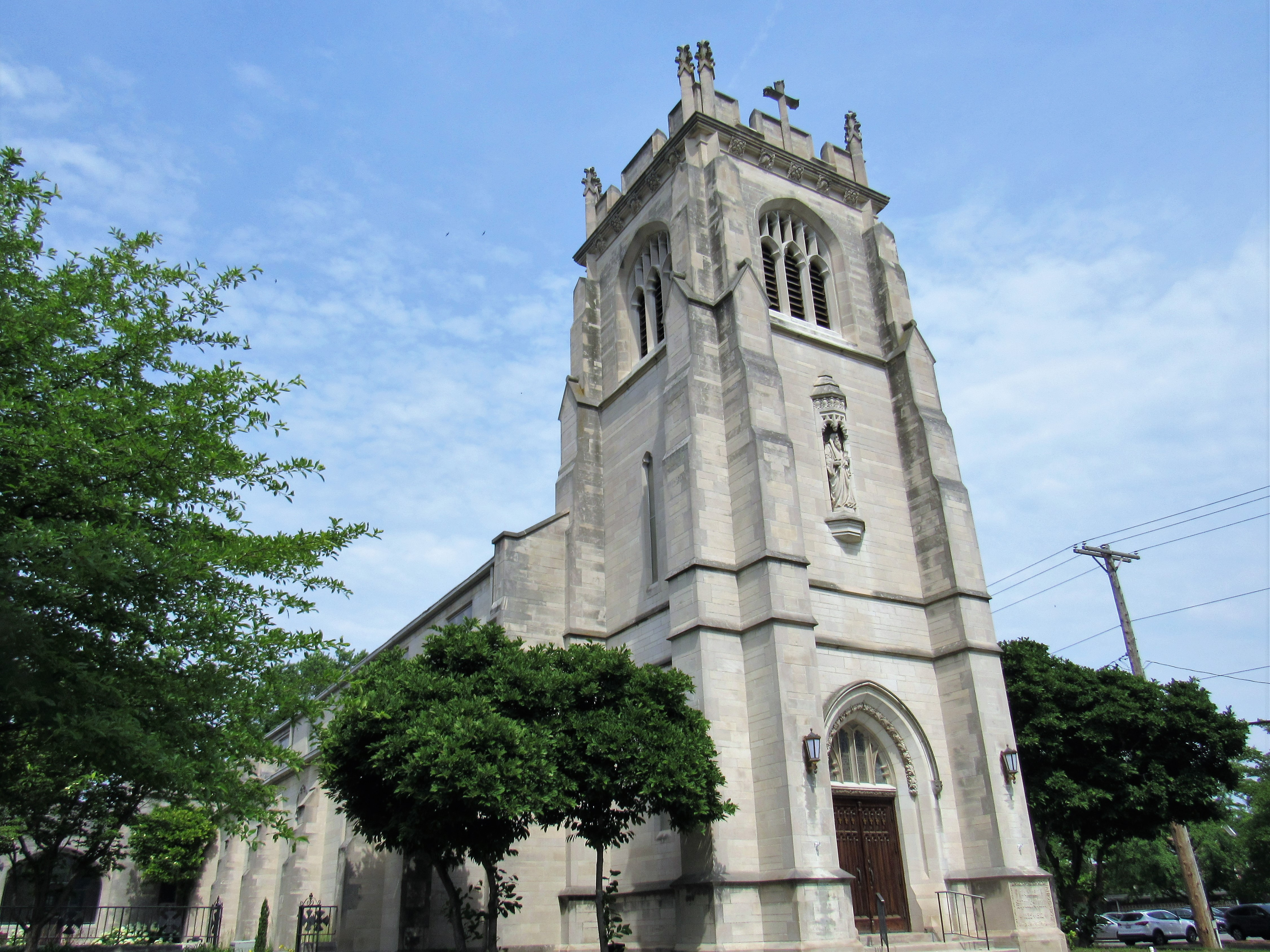
- Cathedral Church of St. Paul

- Location within Illinois
- 39°47′37.42″N 89°39′15.07″W
- Location: 815 S. 2nd St. Springfield, Illinois
- Country: United States
- Denomination: Episcopal Church
- Website: www.stpaulspringfield.com

History
- Founded: June 19, 1835
- Dedication: Saint Paul
- Consecrated: May 13, 1913

Architecture
- Style: Gothic Revival
- Completed: 1913

Administration
- Diocese: Springfield

Clergy
- Bishop: The Rt. Rev. Brian K. Burgess
- Dean: The Very Rev. Andrew Hook, OCS

The Cathedral Church of Saint Paul the Apostle is an Episcopal cathedral in Springfield, Illinois, United States. It is the seat of the Diocese of Springfield. The present church building, the third for the parish, was completed in 1913.

== History ==
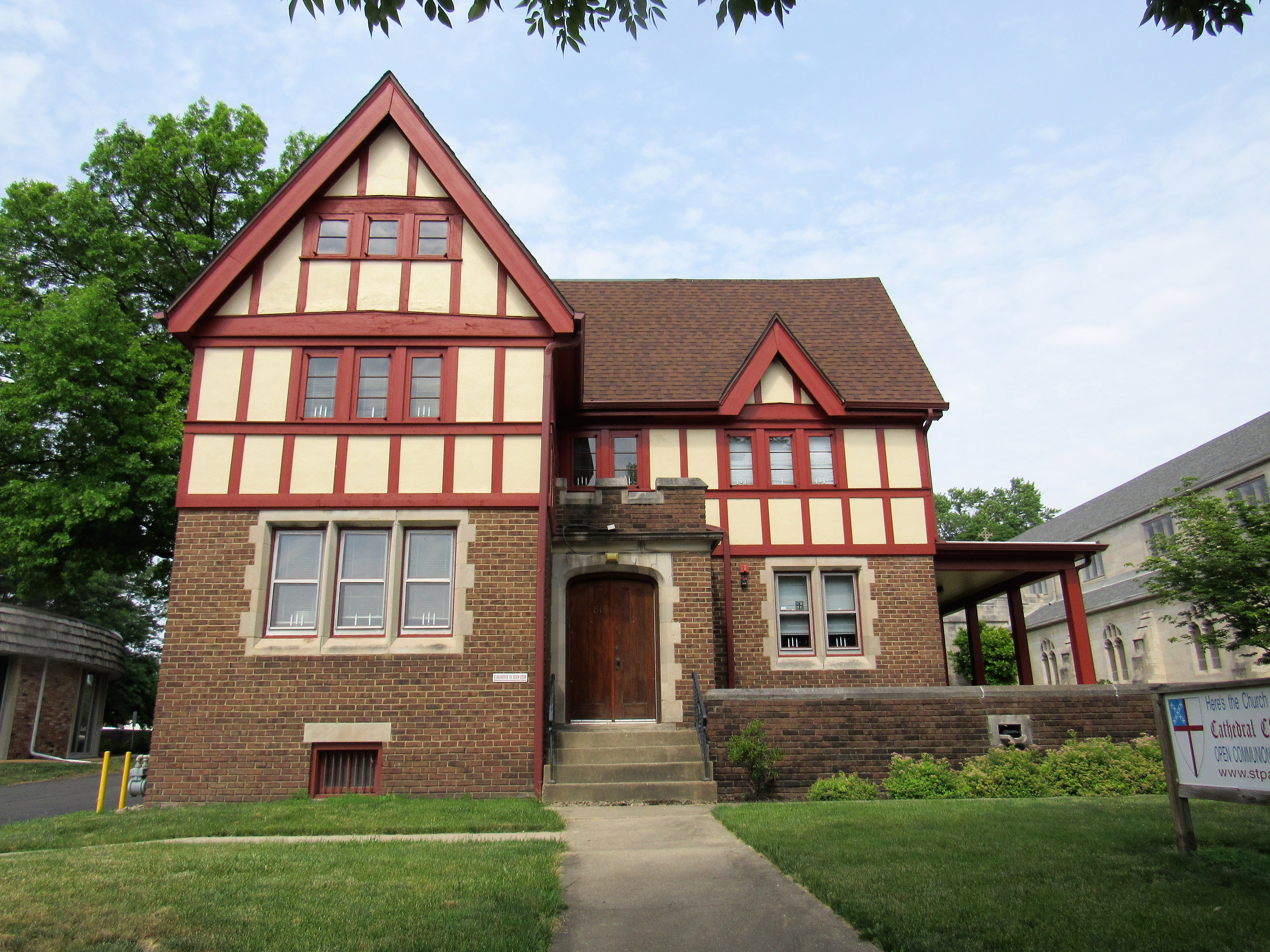
Parish House

John Batchelder of Trinity Church in Jacksonville, Illinois occasionally came to Springfield starting in 1832 to hold services for the local Episcopalians. St. Paul's parish was established by Philander Chase, the first Bishop of Illinois, on June 19, 1835; the same year the Diocese of Illinois was established. The first service after its establishment was held in the home of George Forquer, which would later house the Orphanage of the Holy Child. He placed his nephew, the deacon Samuel Chase, in charge. Initially, the small congregation had no building of its own and so they held services in the local Presbyterian, Methodist, and Christian churches. They also held services in the State Supreme Court Chamber as Chief Justice Samuel L. Treat was one of the organizers of the parish and served as a warden for 52 years. Construction on the congregation's first church building started in the summer of 1838 on Washington Street between Third and Fourth Streets. St. Paul's first rector, Charles Dresser, arrived in May 1838 and lived in a house on Eighth Street that would later belong to Abraham Lincoln. It was Dresser who would witness the Lincolns wedding vows.

As the congregation grew a new church building was needed. Henry Dresser, the rector's brother, was the architect of the new edifice at Fourth and Adams Streets. It was consecrated by Chase on June 24, 1848. The Gothic Revival structure featured a square tower capped with battlements and pinnacles. The exterior was clad in rough-hewn stone that was punctuated with double lancet windows. The Diocese of Springfield was organized in 1877. St. Paul's was named the pro-cathedral of the diocese sometime after 1879. While it now served the function of a Bishop's Church, it was still maintained as a parish church.

Property on the corner of Second and Lawrence was purchased in 1908 for $10,000 and the present cathedral, designed by English-born architect John B. Sutcliffe, was consecrated by Bishop Edward Osborne on May 13, 1913. While St. Paul's Church was recognized as a cathedral early on, there was confusion within the diocese regarding its status as a cathedral. It was not until December 11, 1979, when a constitution and by-laws were adopted establishing the Cathedral Church of St. Paul that its status was clarified.

== See also ==
- List of the Episcopal cathedrals of the United States
- List of cathedrals in the United States
