= George Franklin Seymour =

American bishop

The Right Reverend George Franklin Seymour
- Bishop of Springfield
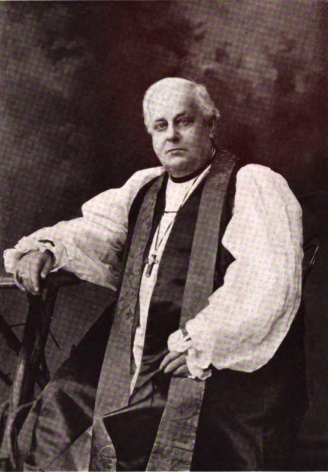
- Church: Episcopal Church
- Diocese: Springfield
- Elected: May 1878
- In office: 1878–1906
- Successor: Edward William Osborne

Orders
- Ordination: September 23, 1855 by Horatio Potter
- Consecration: June 11, 1878 by Horatio Potter

Personal details
- Born: January 5, 1829 Newburgh, New York, United States
- Died: December 8, 1906 (aged 77) Springfield, Illinois, United States
- Buried: Green-Wood Cemetery
- Denomination: Anglican
- Parents: Isaac Newton Seymour & Elvira Belknap
- Spouse: Harriet Atwood Downe (m. 1889)
- Education: General Theological Seminary
- Alma mater: Columbia University

George Franklin Seymour (January 5, 1829 - December 8, 1906) was the first warden of St. Stephen's College (now Bard College) and the first Bishop of Springfield in the Episcopal Church.

== Early life and education ==
Seymour was born on January 5, 1829, in Newburgh, New York, the son of Isaac Newton Seymour and Elvira Belknap. He graduated from Columbia University in 1850, and then studied theology at the General Theological Seminary, from where he earned a Bachelor of Divinity in 1854. He was later awarded an honorary Doctor of Divinity from Racine College in 1874, and a Doctor of Laws from Columbia University in 1878.

== Ordained ministry and career ==
Seymour was ordained deacon on December 17, 1854, by Bishop Horatio Potter of New York, and priest on September 23, 1855, by the same bishop. He was then appointed to serve as a missionary in Annandale-on-Hudson, New York, where he remained till July 1861. While there, Seymour saw the building of a church and a training institution for preparation for the ordained ministry as part of St Stephen's College. In 1861, he became rector of St Mary's Church in Manhattanville, Manhattan, while in 1862, he became rector of Christ Church in Hudson, New York. Then, between 1863 and 1867, he served as rector of St John's Church in Brooklyn.

In 1865, he Seymour elected professor of church history at the General Theological Seminary, and in 1875, he was elected Dean of the same institution. He was also instrumental in retaining the presence of the seminary in Manhattan rather than relocating in a rural location. Between 1867 and 1879, he simultaneously served as chaplain to the House of Mercy.

== Bishop ==
Seymour was elected Bishop of Illinois in 1874, however the House of Deputies refused to confirm the election. On December 19, 1877, he was then elected as the first Bishop of Springfield, and this time the standing committee and the House of Bishops confirmed the election. However, Seymour did not accept the election, formally declining in April 1878. Nonetheless, he was once more re-elected in May 1878, and accepted. He was then consecrated at Trinity Church in New York City on June 11, 1878, by Bishop Horatio Potter.

He died from pneumonia in Springfield, Illinois on December 8, 1906.
