= Thomas J. Brown (bishop of Maine) =

American Episcopal bishop (born 1970)

The Right Reverend Thomas James Brown
- Bishop of Maine
- Church: Episcopal Church
- Diocese: Maine
- Elected: February 9, 2019
- In office: 2019–present
- Predecessor: Stephen T. Lane

Orders
- Ordination: January 18, 1998 by Edward Lewis Lee Jr.
- Consecration: June 22, 2019 by Michael Curry

Personal details
- Born: September 28, 1970 (age 55) Bruce Crossing, Michigan, US
- Denomination: Anglican
- Spouse: Thomas Mousin

Thomas James Brown (born September 28, 1970) is the tenth and current bishop of the Episcopal Diocese of Maine in The Episcopal Church.

== Biography ==
Brown graduated with a Bachelor of Science from Western Michigan University in 1988. After receiving his Master of Divinity from the Church Divinity School of the Pacific in 1997, Brown was ordained priest on January 18, 1998. In 1997 he became associate priest at the Church of St John the Evangelist in San Francisco and director of alumni and church relations at Church Divinity School of the Pacific. He served as rector of St Michael's Church in Brattleboro, Vermont between 2000 and 2009. In 2009 he became rector of the Parish of the Epiphany in Winchester, Massachusetts.

He was elected at a special diocesan convention on February 9, 2019, to succeed Bishop Stephen T. Lane. He was consecrated the tenth bishop of Maine on June 22, 2019. He is the first openly gay bishop to lead the diocese and the third to lead any diocese in the United States.

== See also ==
- List of bishops of the Episcopal Church in the United States of America
- List of Episcopal bishops of the United States
