= Brian K. Burgess =

21st-century American Episcopal Bishop (born 1960)

The Right Reverend Brian K. Burgess SSC
- Bishop-elect of Springfield
- Church: Episcopal Church
- Diocese: Springfield
- Elected: December 11, 2020
- Predecessor: The Right Rev. Dan Martins
- Previous posts: Rector - Christ Episcopal Church, Woodbury, NJ; Associate Rector & Day School Chaplain - St. Luke’s Episcopal Church, Baton Rouge, LA; Rector - St. John’s Episcopal Church, Brooksville, FL

Orders
- Ordination: The Sacred Order of Deacons - June 12, 1999; The Sacred Order of Priests - December 18, 1999
- Consecration: May 22, 2022

Personal details
- Born: November 6, 1960 (age 65)
- Denomination: Anglican-Episcopal
- Education: Ball State University; Sewanee

Brian Kendall Burgess (born November 6, 1960) is the bishop of the Episcopal Diocese of Springfield. He was the Rector of Christ Episcopal Church in Woodbury, New Jersey, Dean of the Woodbury Convocation.

== Biography ==
Burgess was born in Tampa, Florida, and raised in Fort Myers, Florida. After graduating from Ball State University with a BS in Music Education, he became the Director of Bands at North Fort Myers High School and then the Emergency Management Operations Coordinator and Training Coordinator for the Lee County Emergency Management Office. Burgess was also a sworn law enforcement officer.

Burgess left the Emergency Management Office to attend Sewanee, entering the seminary there and graduating in 1999 with his MDiv degree and was called as Deacon-in-Charge and then (following his ordination as a priest) Rector of St. John's Episcopal Church in Brooksville, Florida. After a four-year period as the Chaplain of Saint Luke’s Church Parish Day School in Baton Rouge, Louisiana he was called as Rector of Christ Episcopal Church in Woodbury, New Jersey in 2005.

On October 16, 2019, Burgess was invited to open the United States House of Representatives in prayer by the House Chaplain and the Speaker of the House, Nancy Pelosi, after being sponsored by Representative Trey Hollingsworth.

Fr. Burgess was nominated for Bishop of the Episcopal Diocese of Springfield in the late Spring of 2021, and after a nominating synod was officially announced as one of the three finalists on October 16, 2021, passing through on the third ballot. On December 11, 2021, he was elected as Bishop of the Diocese of Springfield on the second ballot.

== Personal life ==
Bishop Burgess has been married to his wife, Denise, since 1985; they have two children, Robert and Catherine. His nephew is a Catholic priest who serves as a pastor in Orlando, Florida. He is also an FCC licensed-ham radio operator under the callsign KD4UTL.
