= Seabury-Western Theological Seminary =

American Episcopal seminary (1933–2013)

Coordinates: 42.0569°N 87.6779°W

Chapel steeple on the historic former campus in Evanston

Seabury-Western Theological Seminary (SWTS) was a seminary of the Episcopal Church, located in Evanston, Illinois.

It ceased offering the Master of Divinity degree in May 2010, and in January 2012 it moved from Evanston to the Evangelical Lutheran Church in America headquarters near O'Hare Airport. In 2013, it federated with Bexley Hall seminary to form the Bexley Hall Seabury Western Theological Seminary Federation, the federation then moved to the second floor of Chicago Theological Seminary in July 2016 to continue to offer its academic degrees including its Master of Divinity degree in a hybrid format. The Federation is commonly known as Bexley Seabury.

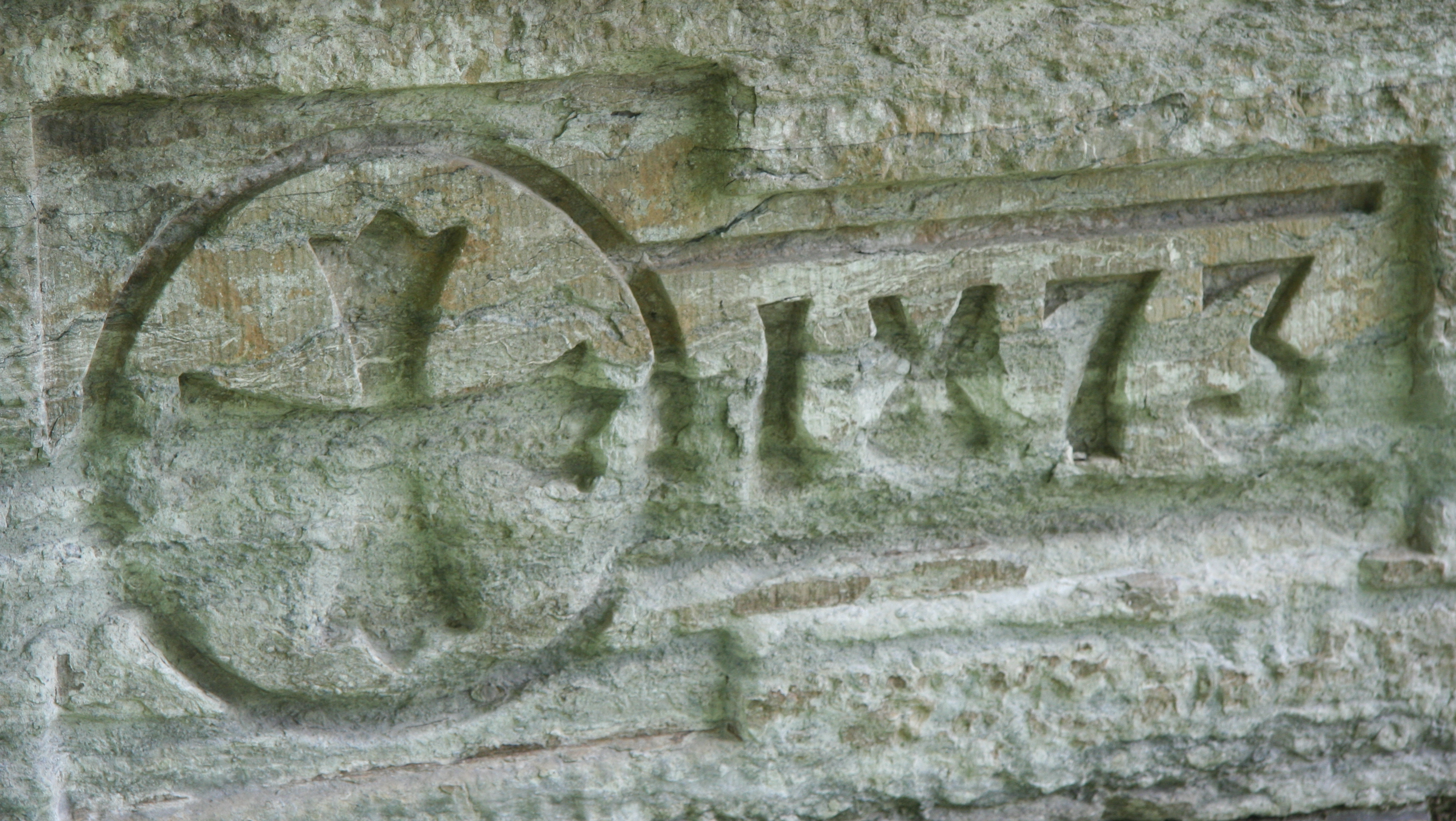
Cornerstone of Seabury Divinity Hall in Faribault, Minnesota

Seabury-Western was formed in 1933 by a merger of Western Theological Seminary of Evanston (founded in 1883 in Chicago), and Seabury Divinity School of Faribault, Minnesota (founded in 1858). The new seminary endeavored to hold in tension the "High Church" and "Low Church" identities of its predecessors. However, for most of its history, SWTS occupied a place within Anglican churchmanship akin to that of the General Theological Seminary in New York: a liturgical bent toward Anglo-Catholic practices and an acceptance of modern theology and social tolerance.

In the fall of 2008, the seminary stopped accepting seminarians for the traditional Master of Divinity (M.Div.) degree. In 2009, Seabury's Evanston property was acquired by Northwestern University, with Seabury allowed continuing use of it for five years. In January 2012, Seabury formally left the Evanston site, functionally ending its presence as a residential seminary, and its former buildings are now used by Northwestern University. The seminary moved its offices to the national headquarters of the Evangelical Lutheran Church in America (ELCA), near O'Hare Airport. In March 2012, the boards of Seabury-Western and of Bexley Hall Seminary in Bexley, Ohio, voted to federate. Roger Ferlo was named as the federation's first president.

Inaugurated April 27, 2013, Bexley Seabury seminary initially offered the Master of Divinity degree at the former Bexley Hall campus in Columbus through a partnership with Trinity Lutheran Seminary. From its Chicago campus near O'Hare Airport, the federation offered its Doctor of Ministry degree in Congregational Development and also a Doctor of Ministry (D.Min.) degree in Preaching, through the Association of Chicago Theological Schools. A Diploma of Anglican Studies was offered in both Columbus and Chicago.

In July 2016, Bexley Seabury consolidated on a single campus location at Chicago Theological Seminary in Chicago's Hyde Park/Woodlawn district. There, it offers the Master of Divinity degree and two Doctor of Ministry degrees (in Preaching, through the Association of Chicago Theological Schools) as well as the Diploma in Anglican Studies and continuing education and lifelong learning courses.

== See also ==
- A. K. M. Adam (b. 1957), professor
- Edith Bideau (1888–1958), director of music
- Mark Bourlakas, alumnus
- James Lloyd Breck (1818–1876), founder of the school
- Albert W. Hillestad, alumnus, Bishop of Springfield
- Frederick W. Keator (1855–1924), alumnus, first Bishop of Olympia
- Leonel Mitchell, professor and lecturer in Liturgics and Church History (1978–2005), professor emeritus until his death in 2012
- Robert S. Morse, alumnus
- Mark Sisk (b. 1942), president and dean, 1984–1998
- Richard Thieme (b. 1944), alumnus
- Charles Vaché (1926–2009), alumnus, Bishop of Southern Virginia
- Alan Watts (1915–1973), alumnus
- O'Kelley Whitaker, alumnus
- John Albert Williams, alumnus
- Robert M. Wolterstorff (1914–2007), alumnus, first Bishop of San Diego

== Bibliography ==
- Thomas Ferguson, Beyond Walls: A Bicentennial History of Bexley Hall Seabury-Western Seminary Federation (Wipf and Stock, 2025) ISBN 9798385240869
