= Episcopal Diocese of Maine =

Episcopal Church diocese in the US

Diocese of Maine
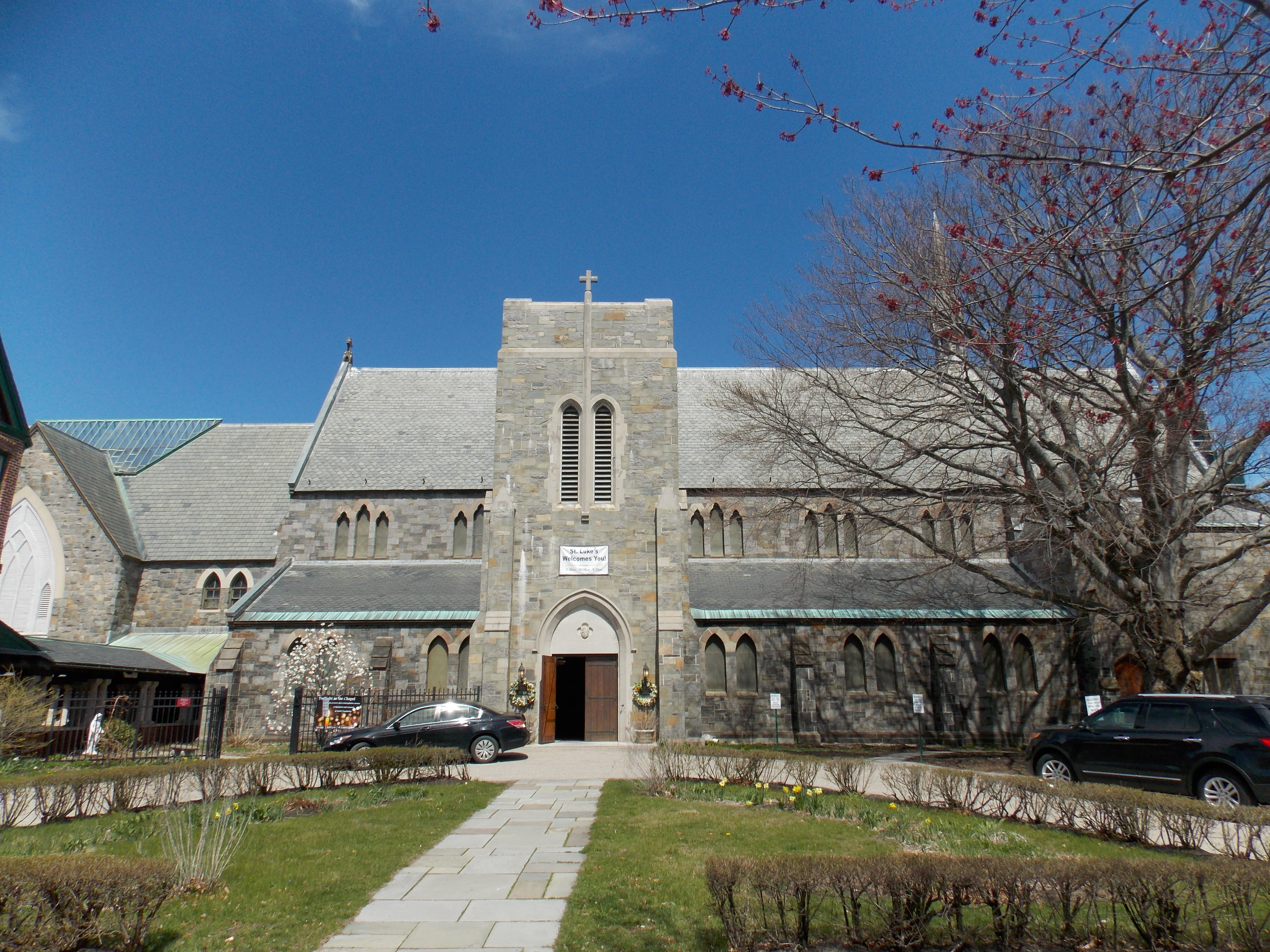
- Cathedral Church of St. Luke

- Coat of arms

Location
- Territory: Maine
- Ecclesiastical province: Province I
- Coordinates: 45°30′N 69°00′W

Statistics
- Congregations: 57 (17 Summer Chapels)
- Members: 7,546 (2025)

Information
- Denomination: Episcopal Church
- Established: September 5, 1820
- Cathedral: Cathedral Church of St. Luke

Current leadership
- Bishop: Thomas J. Brown

Map
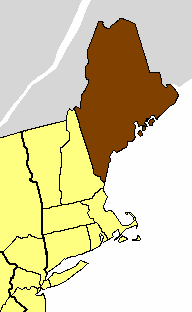
- Location of the Diocese of Maine

Website
- episcopalmaine.org

The Episcopal Diocese of Maine is a diocese of the Episcopal Church in the United States of America and encompasses the entire State of Maine. It is part of the Province of New England — Province I. The diocese reported 11,643 members in 2015 and 7,546 members in 2025. Plate and pledge income for the 57 filing congregations of the diocese in 2025 was $8,446,405. Average Sunday attendance (ASA) was 2,732 persons, down from 3,820 in 2016.

The Diocese has 57 year-round congregations and 17 summer chapels. The see city is Portland. Its cathedral is the Cathedral Church of St. Luke. Thomas J. Brown was elected tenth Bishop of Maine on February 9, 2019. Brown was consecrated and assumed office on June 22, 2019. Brown is the first openly gay bishop to lead the diocese.

The Diocese of Maine was created in 1820 from the Eastern Diocese (which included all of New England save Connecticut) and elected its first bishop, George Burgess in 1847.

== Bishops ==
- George Burgess (1847 - 1866)
- Henry A. Neely (1867 - 1899)
- Robert Codman (1900 - 1915)
- Benjamin Brewster (1916 - 1940)
- Oliver Leland Loring (1941 - 1968)
- Frederick Wolf (1968-1986)
- Edward C. Chalfant (1986 - 1996)
- Chilton R. Knudsen (1998 - 2008)
- Stephen T. Lane (2008 - 2019)
- Thomas J. Brown (2019–present)
