= Episcopal Diocese of Springfield =

Episcopal Church diocese in the US

Diocese of Springfield Dioecesis Springfieldensis
- Coat of arms

Location
- Country: United States
- Territory: Carroll, Champaign, Christian, Clark, Coles, Cumberland, De Witt, Douglas, Edgar, Greene, Jersey, Logan, Macon, Macoupin, Mason, McLean, Menard, Montgomery, Morgan, Moultrie, Piatt, Sangamon, Scott, Shelby, Tazewell, Vermillion
- Ecclesiastical province: Province V
- Coordinates: 39°47′36″N 89°39′14″W

Statistics
- Congregations: 33 (2025)
- Members: 2,324 (2023)

Information
- Denomination: Episcopal Church
- Established: December 18, 1877
- Cathedral: St Paul's Cathedral
- Language: English

Current leadership
- Bishop: Brian K. Burgess, SSC

Map
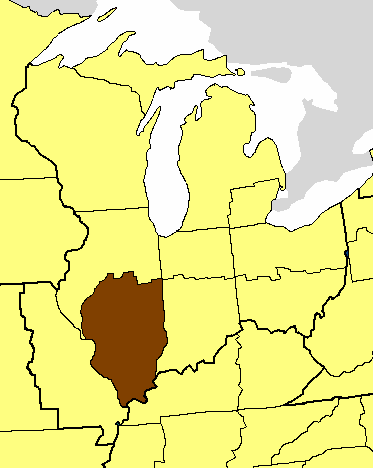
- Location of the Diocese of Springfield

Website
- www.episcopalspringfield.org

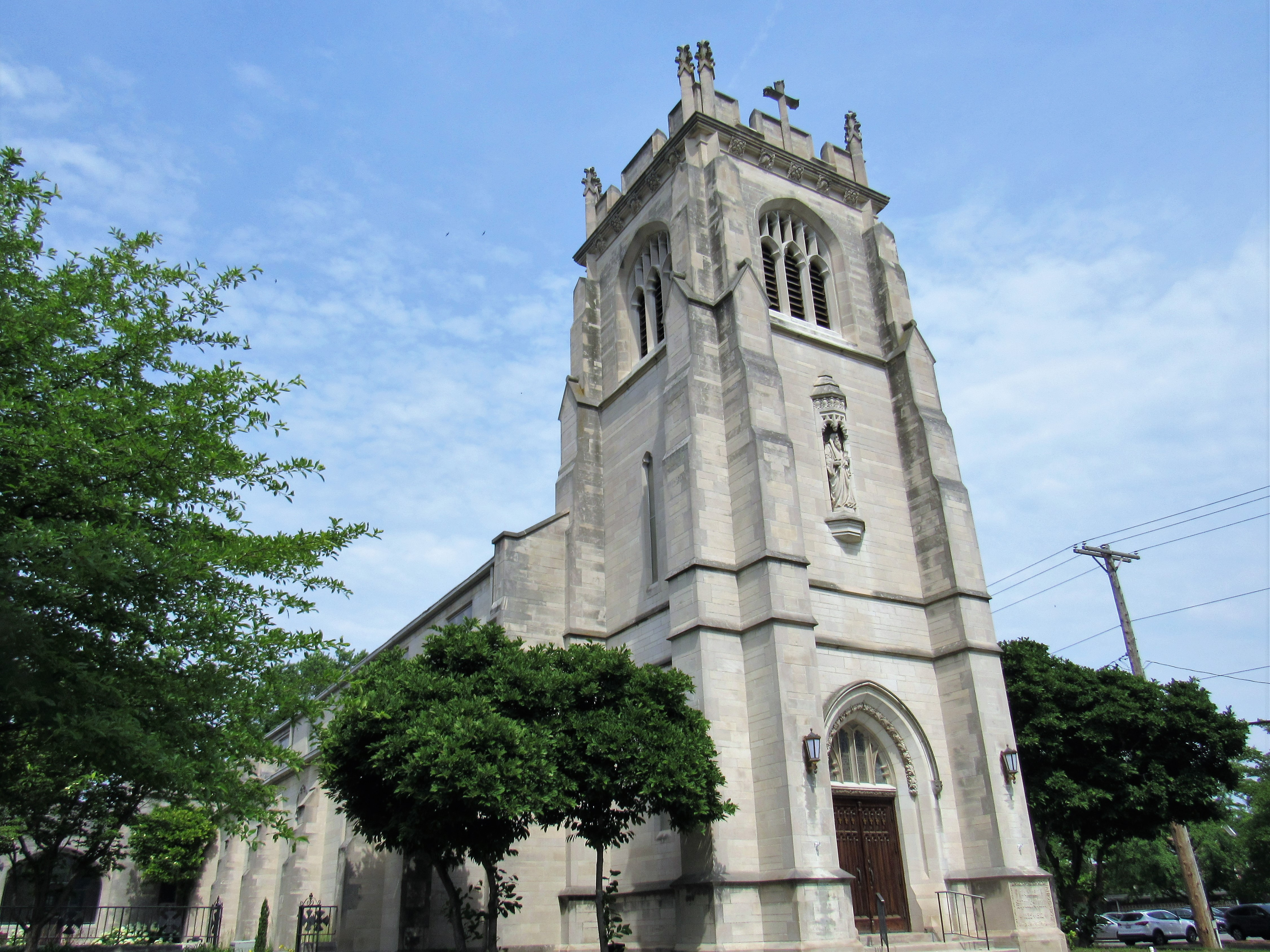
Cathedral of St. Paul the Apostle

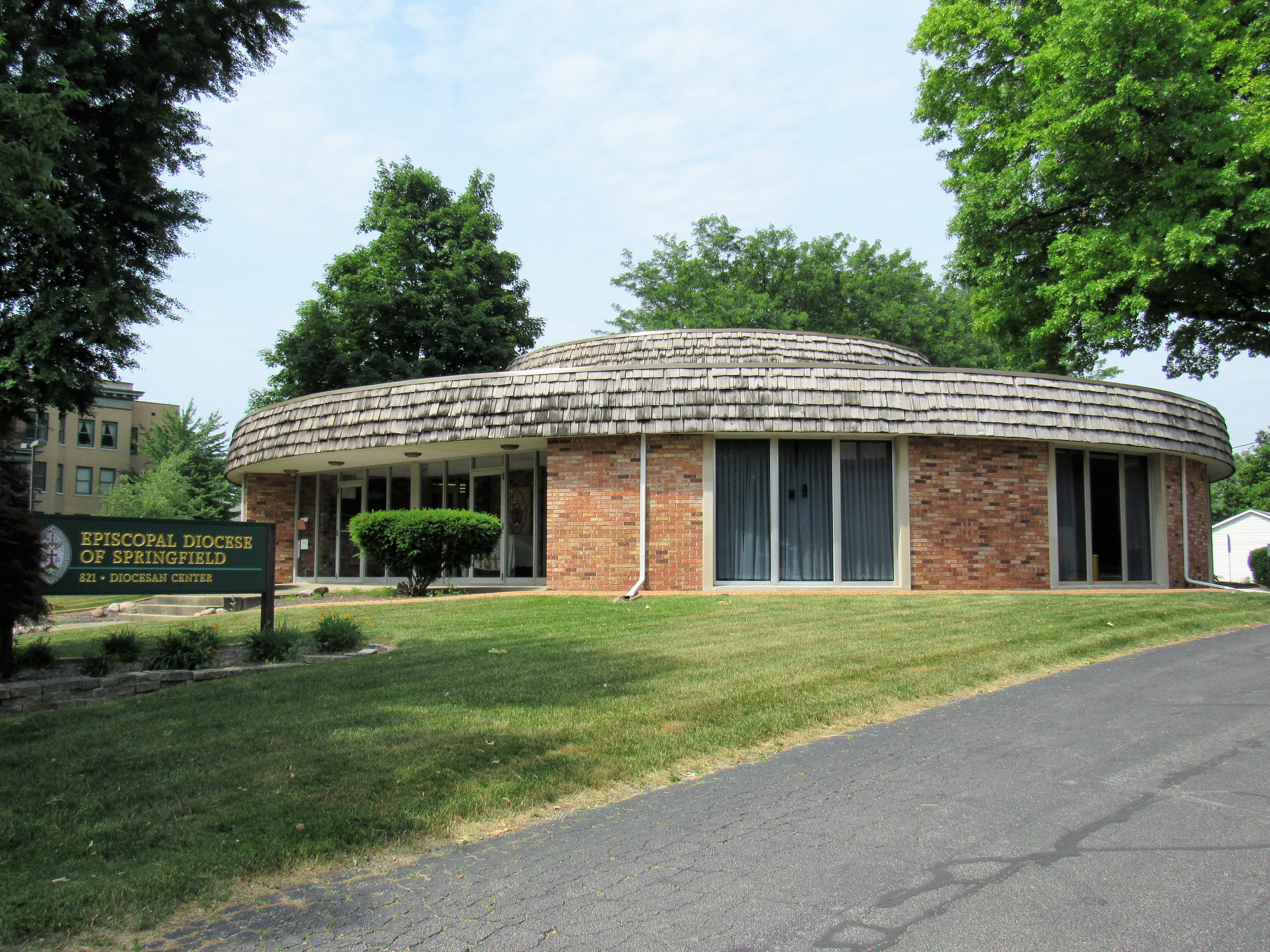
Diocesan Center

The Episcopal Diocese of Springfield is a diocese of the Episcopal Church in the United States of America. It is located in the state of Illinois and includes the area east of the Illinois River and south of the Counties of Woodford, Livingston, Ford, and Iroquois. The diocese was founded when the former Episcopal Diocese of Illinois split into three separate Dioceses (Springfield, Quincy, and Chicago) in 1877.

In 2025, the diocese reported average Sunday attendance (ASA) of 1,138 persons, down from 1,545 reported in 2015. The most recent membership statistics (2025) showed 2,324 persons in 33 churches, a decline from 4,138 in 2015. The 33 congregations of the diocese reported $3,731,402 of plate and pledge income in 2025.

On December 11, 2021, the Diocese elected the Very Rev. Brian K. Burgess of Woodbury, New Jersey to serve as the 12th Bishop of Springfield.

== Parishes ==
- Albion, Illinois: St. John's
- Alton, Illinois: St. Paul's
- Belleville, Illinois: St. George's
- Bloomington, Illinois: St. Matthew's
- Cairo, Illinois: Redeemer
- Carbondale, Illinois: St. Andrew's
- Carlinville, Illinois: St. Paul's
- Centralia, Illinois: St. John's
- Champaign, Illinois:

Emmanuel Memorial
Chapel of St. John the Divine

- Danville, Illinois: Holy Trinity
- Decatur, Illinois: St. John's
- Edwardsville, Illinois: St. Andrew's
- Effingham, Illinois: St. Laurence
- Glen Carbon, Illinois: St. Thomas'
- Granite City, Illinois: St. Bartholomew's
- Harrisburg, Illinois: St. Stephen's
- Havana, Illinois: St. Barnabas'
- Jacksonville, Illinois: Trinity
- Lincoln, Illinois: Trinity
- Marion, Illinois: St. James'
- Mattoon, Illinois: Trinity
- Morton, Illinois: All Saints'
- Mt. Carmel, Illinois: St. John the Baptist
- Mt. Vernon, Illinois: Trinity
- Normal, Illinois: Christ the King
- O'Fallon, Illinois: St. Michael's
- Pekin, Illinois: St. Paul's
- Rantoul, Illinois: St. Christopher's
- Robinson, Illinois: St. Mary's
- Salem, Illinois: St. Thomas'
- Springfield, Illinois:

Cathedral Church of St. Paul
Christ Church
St. Luke's

- West Frankfort, Illinois: St. Mark's

== Bishops ==
1. George Franklin Seymour, 1878-1906
2. Edward William Osborne, diocesan 1906-1917
3. Granville Hudson Sherwood, 1917-1923
4. John Chanler White, 1924-1947
5. Richard T. Loring, 1947-1948
6. Charles A. Clough, 1948-1961
7. Albert Arthur Chambers, 1962-1972
8. Albert W. Hillestad, 1972-1981
9. Donald M. Hultstrand, 1982-1991
10. Peter H. Beckwith, 1992-2010
11. Daniel Hayden Martins, 2011– June 30, 2021
12. Brian K. Burgess, 2022-present
