= Cathedral Church of St. Luke (Portland, Maine) =

St Luke's Cathedral
- The Cathedral Church of Saint Luke
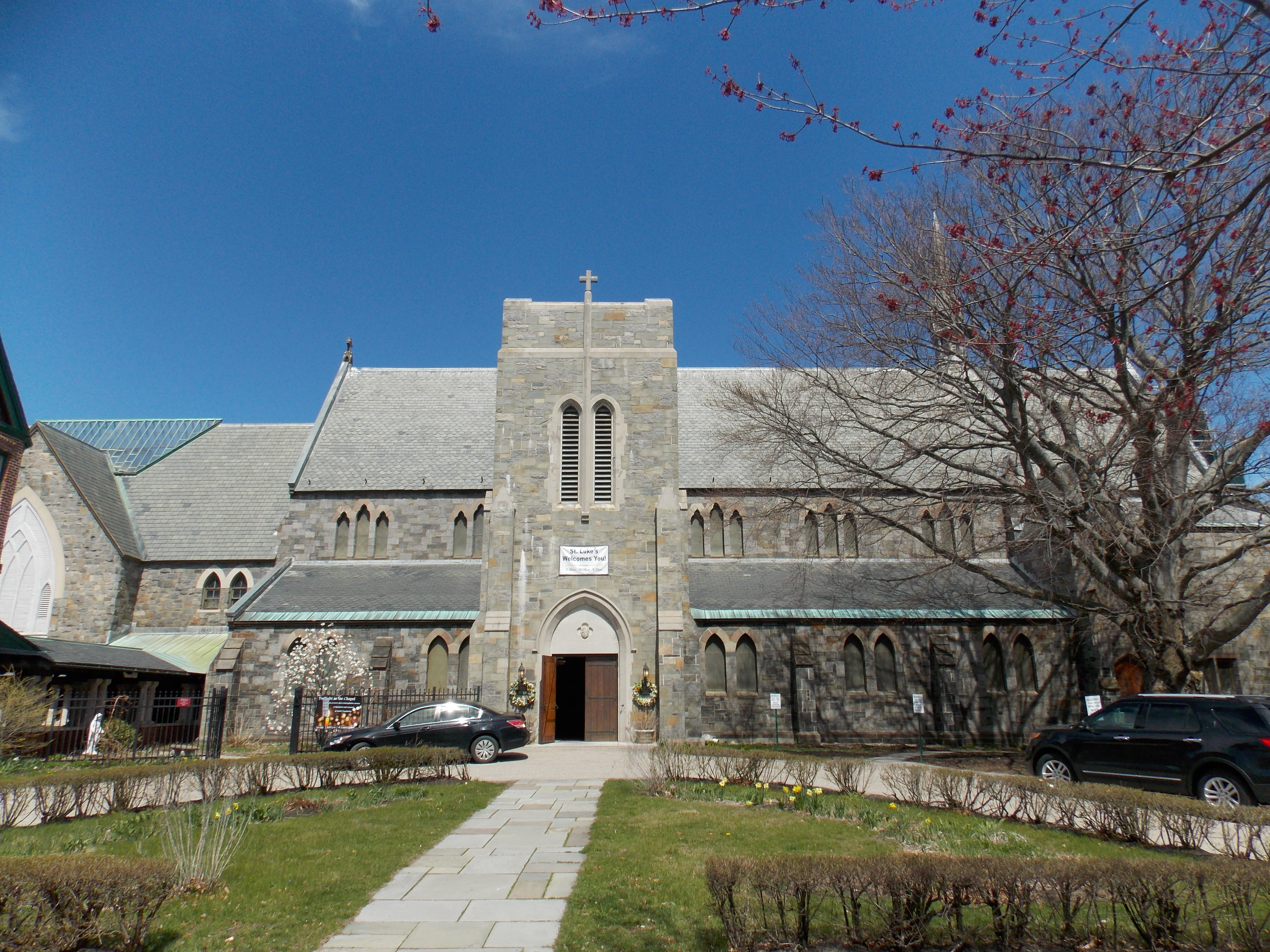
- St Luke's Cathedral
- 43°39′8.25″N 70°15′52.37″W
- Location: 143 State St. Portland, Maine
- Country: United States
- Denomination: Episcopal Church
- Website: www.stlukesportland.org

History
- Founded: 1851
- Founder: The Rt. Rev. Horatio Southgate
- Dedication: Saint Luke
- Consecrated: October 18, 1877

Architecture
- Architect: Charles Coolidge Haight
- Style: Gothic Revival
- Groundbreaking: 1867
- Completed: 1868
- Construction cost: $115,000

Specifications
- Length: 130 feet (40 m)
- Height: 60 feet (18 m)
- Materials: Limestone

Administration
- District: Presumpscot
- Province: New England
- Diocese: Maine

Clergy
- Bishop: Thomas J. Brown
- Dean: Carol Morehead

The Cathedral Church of St. Luke is an Episcopal cathedral located in Portland, Maine, United States. It is the seat of the Diocese of Maine.

The cathedral reported 605 members in 2025. Plate and pledge income for the congregation in 2025 was $476,767 with average Sunday attendance (ASA) of 169. Average Sunday Attendance reported in 2020 was 302 persons.

== History ==
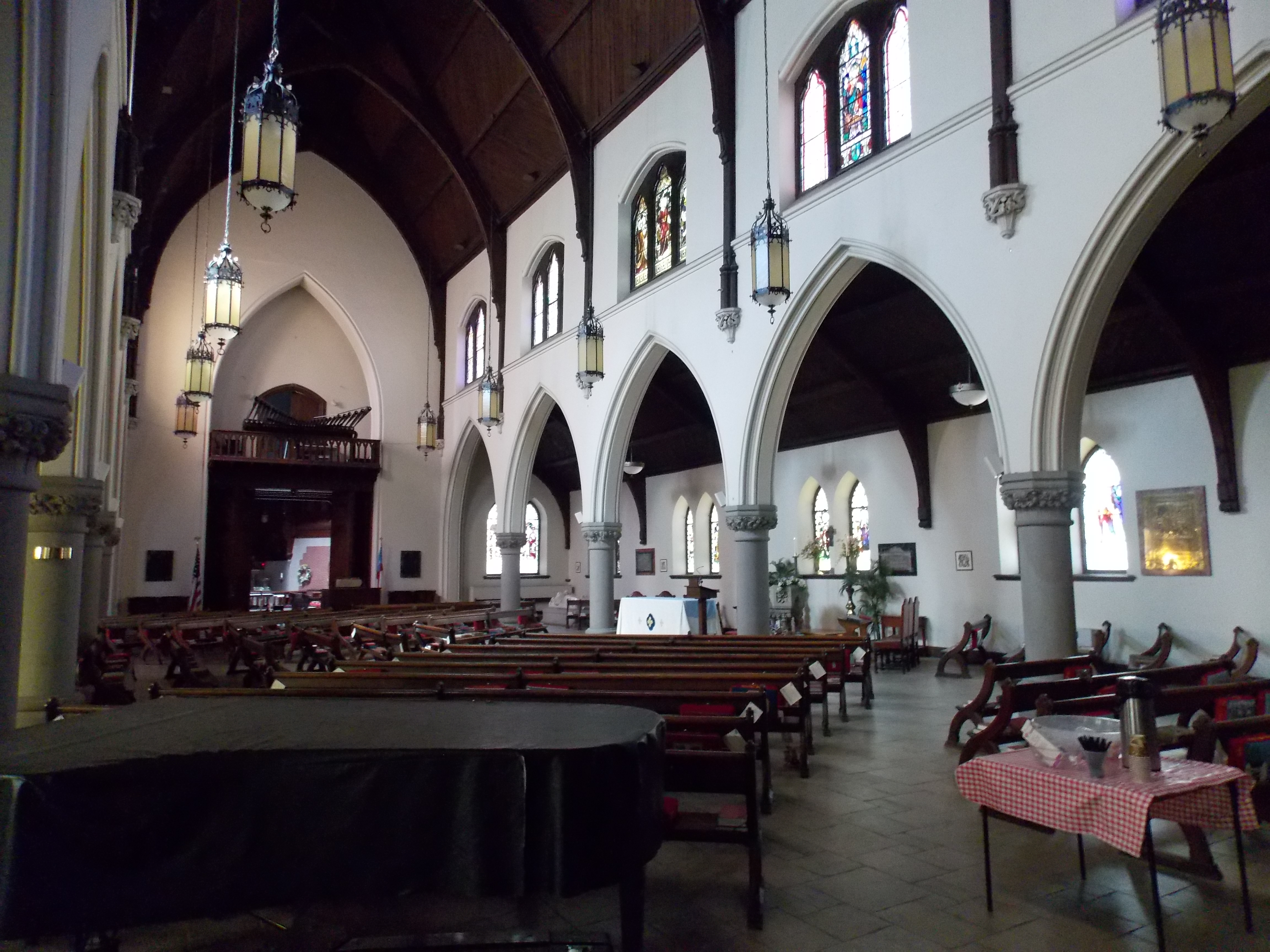
Cathedral interior

St. Luke's Church was begun in 1851 by the Rt. Rev. Horatio Southgate, a Portland native who had served as the Episcopal Missionary Bishop to Constantinople. Its first church building was built on Congress Street near Longfellow Square in the city's West End. By 1866 St. Luke's had grown to be the largest parish in the state and it was chosen to be the cathedral church for the diocese. The cornerstone for the cathedral church was laid on August 15 the following year. The Gothic Revival style structure was designed by New York architect Charles Coolidge Haight. The first services were held on Christmas Day in 1868. The old church building was sold to St. Stephen’s parish. The cathedral was consecrated on October 18, 1877 after the mortgages had been retired. Two years later the cathedral was incorporated by an act of the Maine legislature.

Over the years several additions have been made to the cathedral church. The Augustus R. Wright Memorial Rose Window was installed in 1898. From 1904 to 1905 the Emmanuel Chapel and the cenotaph of Bishop Neely were built. The chapel was designed by Stephen Russell Hurd Codman. The Incarnation Reredos, high altar, silver cross and candlesticks were added in 1925. In 1928 the Skinner pipe organ was built. The deWolfe Belfry, which provided a new entrance for the cathedral, was built in 1957. It was designed by the architectural firm of Cram & Ferguson. The parish house was extensively damaged in a fire in 1985. Repairs were completed two years later. A new free standing altar table was installed in 1990. In 2003 a $1.2 million renovation project was completed.

== See also ==
- List of the Episcopal cathedrals of the United States
- List of cathedrals in the United States
