= Paul Monette: The Brink of Summer's End =

1996 American biographical documentary film

Paul Monette: The Brink; of Summer's End
- VHS cover
- Directed by: Monte Bramer
- Written by: Monte Bramer
- Based on: Paul Monette
- Produced by: Lesli Klainberg
- Starring: Judith Light; Robert Desiderio; Winston Wilde; Larry Kramer; Star Black
- Narrated by: Linda Hunt; Jonathan Fried (readings)
- Edited by: Chris Reiss
- Music by: Jon Ehrlich
- Production company: Brink of Summer's End
- Distributed by: First Run Features; Cinemax
- Release date: 1996 (Outfest)
- Running time: 90 minutes
- Country: United States
- Language: English

Paul Monette: The Brink of Summer's End is a 1996 American biographical documentary film written and directed by Monte Bramer. The film is based on the life of gay writer and AIDS activist Paul Monette, who died from the disease in 1995. Appearing as themselves in the film are Judith Light, Robert Desiderio, Winston Wilde, Larry Kramer, Star Black and his brother Robert Monette. The documentary is narrated by Linda Hunt. The film premiered in 1996 at Outfest Los Angeles, where it won an award for Best Documentary. The film had its television premiere on Cinemax in 1997.

== Synopsis and background ==
Filmmakers Monte Bramer and Lesli Klainberg were initially going to make a film about numerous American gays and lesbians, but after interviewing Monette, they found him so interesting, the pair switched course and decided to focus their project on him alone. They used footage from home movies, and an additional forty hours of videotape shot during the three years prior to Monette's death. The film starts by detailing his early life, which was spent in the closet, and teaching literature and writing at a prep school.

The film then moves on to chronicle his three relationships he had, with two of those partners dying of AIDS. The documentary highlights his time with his first partner, Roger Horwitz, a lawyer, with whom he moved to Los Angeles in 1977. Monette achieved critical acclaim for writing the book, Borrowed Time: An AIDS Memoir, which told the story of Horwitz's physical decline, and eventual death from AIDS in 1986.

His next relationship shown in the film is with Stephen Kolzak, who was at one time, a senior vice president of casting at Columbia Pictures Television, and was the casting director for multiple primetime television shows. (Note: Cheers, Starsky and Hutch, The Facts of Life, Silver Spoons, One Day at a Time, The Jeffersons and Who's the Boss?.) Like Monette, he was also an AIDS activist. He died from the disease in 1990. His last partner, who was featured and offered commentary for the film, is Winston Wilde, who remained with Monette until his death from AIDS in 1995.

The documentary is narrated by Linda Hunt, with additional narration for selected readings from Monette's works by Jonathan Fried. His former lovers Horwitz and Kolzak, along with Monette, appear via archive footage. Judith Light and Larry Kramer, both well-known AIDS activists, were interviewed and offered commentary on Monette's achievements and his activism, and Light, who was a speaker at his memorial service, also talked about giving the first GLAAD Stephen F. Kolzak Award (named after his lover), to Monette.

Go without hate, but not without rage; heal the world.

— Paul Monette: The Brink of Summer's End

== Cast ==
Appearing as themselves

- Judith Light
- Robert Desiderio
- Winston Wilde
- Larry Kramer
- Star Black
- Robert Monette
- Linda Hunt (narrator)
- Jonathan Fried (narrator: readings)

Archive footage

- Paul Monette
- Tom Hulce
- Roger Horwitz
- Stephen Kolzak

== Critical reception ==
Film critic Stephen Holden said the film "presents Monette's life as an unabashedly heroic journey from fear into ferocity". Holden also noted that a lesson to be learned from the movie is "how difficult it was, even for someone like Monette, who came from a stable, loving family and had the best education money could buy, to accept his own homosexuality". Steve Johnson wrote in the Chicago Tribune that the film works because it isn't just a narrative of the tragic end of Monette's life, instead it relays the "story of an artist finding his voice and the specific one of this artist continuing to celebrate life even as it kicks him around".

David Chute of the Los Angeles Times wrote in his blurb that the documentary is a robust account of Monette's life "devoted stubbornly, even heroically, to self-expression". Chute also notes that Monette once wrote, "I’m not dying of AIDS...I’m dying of homophobia", which is clearly demonstrated in the film. Film critic Godfrey Cheshire gave it a positive review in Variety, saying the film is successful "because it tells the tale of an exceptional man", and the documentary is especially touching in "depicting the love binding him and Winston Wilde, an extraordinarily devoted and generous companion".

David Noh of Film Journal International was overall generally pleased with the film, but did criticize the ending for "coming off as somewhat exploitative". Noh argued that Bramer focused too much on Monette's dying and physical deterioration at the end of his life; you see him go from enjoying life to its fullest, to "ravaged invalid and, ultimately, a living corpse, gasping for breath on his bed". Noh said if the filmmakers intention was making a "politicized point...about governmental indifference and the devastating reality of AIDS", the closing footage nonetheless "robs the man of his human dignity". Russell Smith of The Austin Chronicle wrote that Bramer portrays Monette as someone whose "inability to face a core element of his own identity, his homosexuality, barred him from any real self-knowledge until early middle age". He rated the film.

== Accolades ==
| Festival / Organization | Award | Result | Ref. |
|---|---|---|---|
| CableACE Award | Directing a Documentary Special (Monte Bramer) | Nominated | |
| GLAAD Media Awards | Outstanding Documentary | Won | |
| Outfest Los Angeles | Outstanding Documentary | Won | |
| San Francisco International Lesbian and Gay Film Festival | Best Documentary | Won | |
| Sundance Film Festival | Best Documentary (Audience Award) | Won | |
| Sundance Film Festival | Best Documentary (Grand Jury) | Nominated | |

== See also ==
- HIV/AIDS activism
- Paul Monette's bibliography
