= GLAAD Stephen F. Kolzak Award =

Annual award

The GLAAD Stephen F. Kolzak Award is a special GLAAD Media Award presented annually by the Gay & Lesbian Alliance Against Defamation. It is named in honor of the Los Angeles casting director Stephen F. Kolzak, who devoted the last part of his life to fighting homophobia and AIDS-phobia within the entertainment industry. The award is given to an openly LGBTQ member of the entertainment or media community for their work toward eliminating homophobia. It has been awarded since 1991, with Kolzak being the posthumous inaugural recipient.

== List of recipients ==
- 1991 – Stephen F. Kolzak (posthumous)
- 1992 – Paul Monette and Lillian Faderman
- 1993 – Sir Ian McKellen
- 1994 – none
- 1995 – Pedro Zamora
- 1996 – none
- 1997 – Bruce Vilanch
- 1998 – Ellen DeGeneres
- 1999 – Melissa Etheridge and Julie Cypher
- 2000 – Anne Heche
- 2001 – Paris Barclay
- 2002 – Alan Ball
- 2003 – Todd Haynes
- 2004 – John Waters
- 2005 – Bill Condon
- 2006 – Melissa Etheridge
- 2007 – Martina Navratilova
- 2008 – Rufus Wainwright
- 2009 – Gene Robinson
- 2010 – Wanda Sykes
- 2011 – Robert Greenblatt
- 2012 – Chaz Bono
- 2013 – Steve Warren (attorney)
- 2014 – Laverne Cox
- 2015 – Roland Emmerich
- 2016 – Ruby Rose
- 2017 – Troye Sivan
- 2018 – Jim Parsons
- 2019 – Sean Hayes
- 2020 – Janet Mock
- 2022 – Michaela Jaé Rodriguez
- 2023 – Jeremy Pope
- 2024 – Niecy Nash-Betts
- 2025 – Cynthia Erivo
