= St. Thomas' Parish (Washington, D.C.) =

Episcopal church in Washington, D.C., U.S.

Coordinates: 38.9102°N 77.041°W

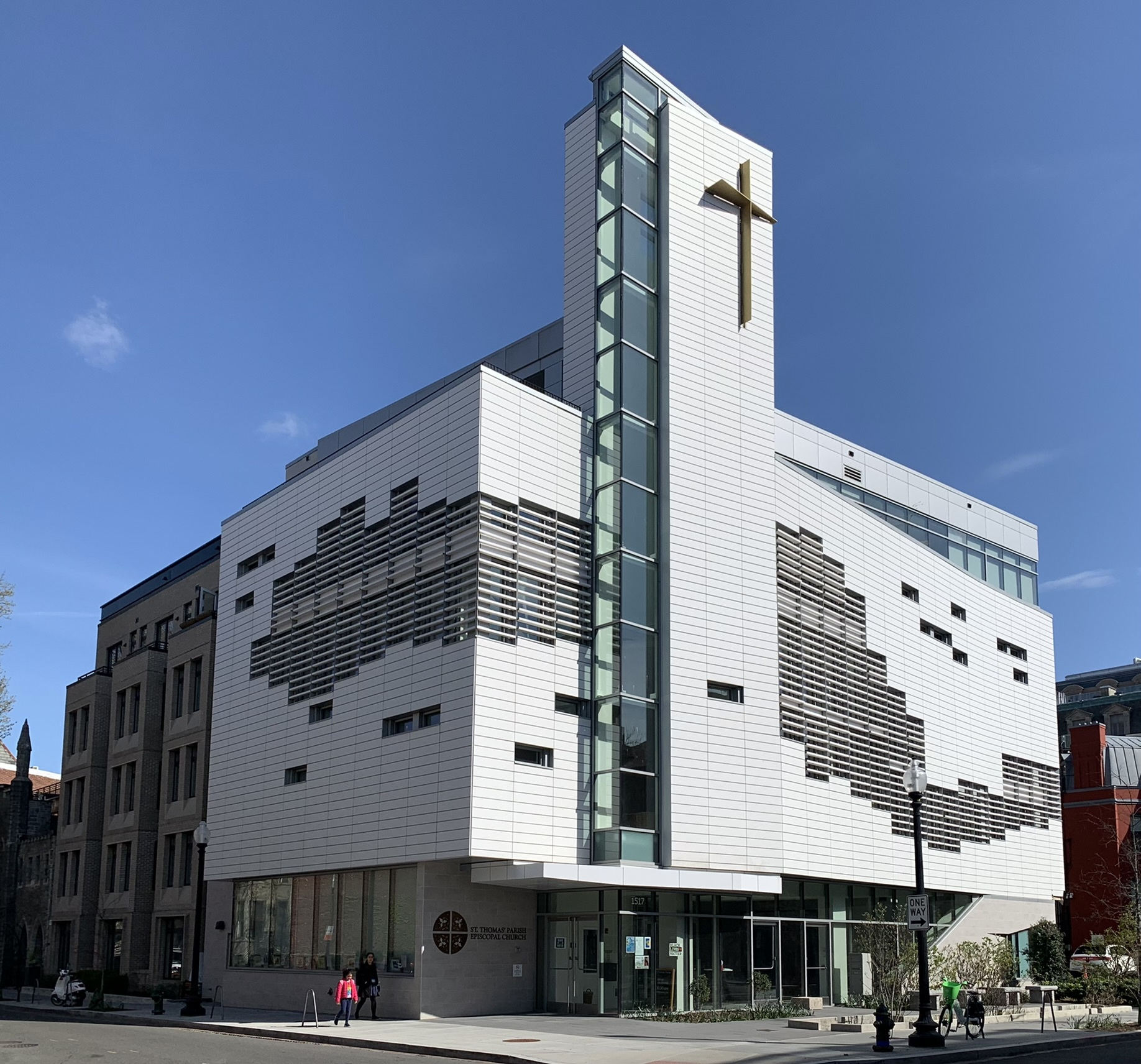
External view in 2022

St. Thomas' Parish is an Episcopal church in Washington, D.C. It is part of the Episcopal Diocese of Washington. The church reported 351 members in 2015 and 183 members in 2023; no membership statistics were reported in 2024 parochial reports. Plate and pledge income reported for the congregation in 2024 was $238,240. Average Sunday attendance (ASA) in 2024 was 80 persons.

== History ==
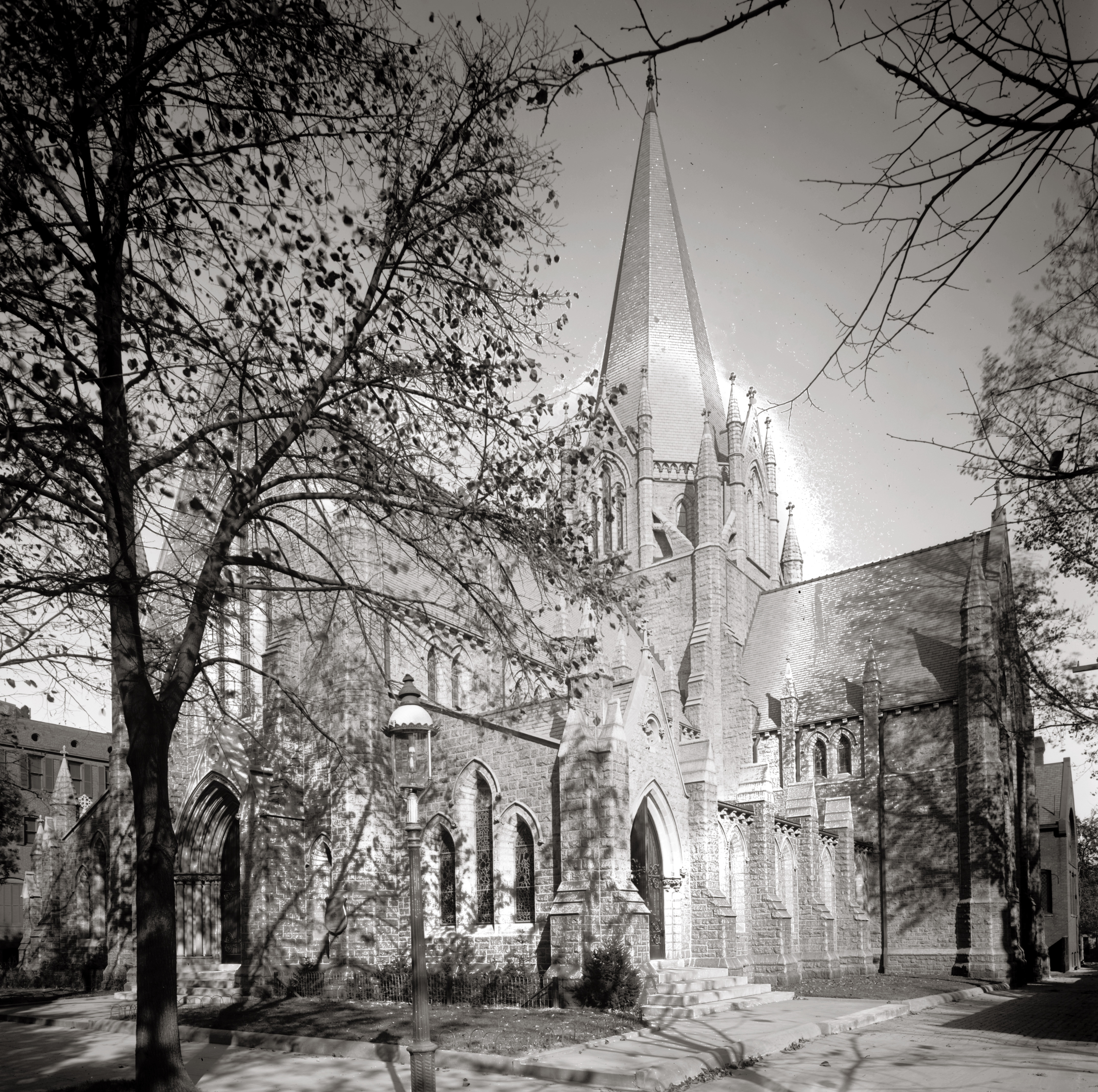
St. Thomas' Parish, ca. 1910s

Calvary Parish was formed in 1891 to serve the Dupont Circle area of Washington with the Rev. John Abel Aspinwall as its first rector. Rev. Aspinwall was the son of William H. Aspinwall, who built the Panama Railroad across Panama. The cornerstone of the new St. Thomas' Parish church building was laid in 1894. The first service took place on June 25, 1899.

Over the years, numerous well-known social and political figures worshiped at St. Thomas' Parish, including Franklin D. Roosevelt, Harry Truman, and Mrs. Woodrow Wilson. On the first Sunday of Lent in 1933, parishioners welcomed the return of Roosevelt, who the day before had been inaugurated as President of the United States.

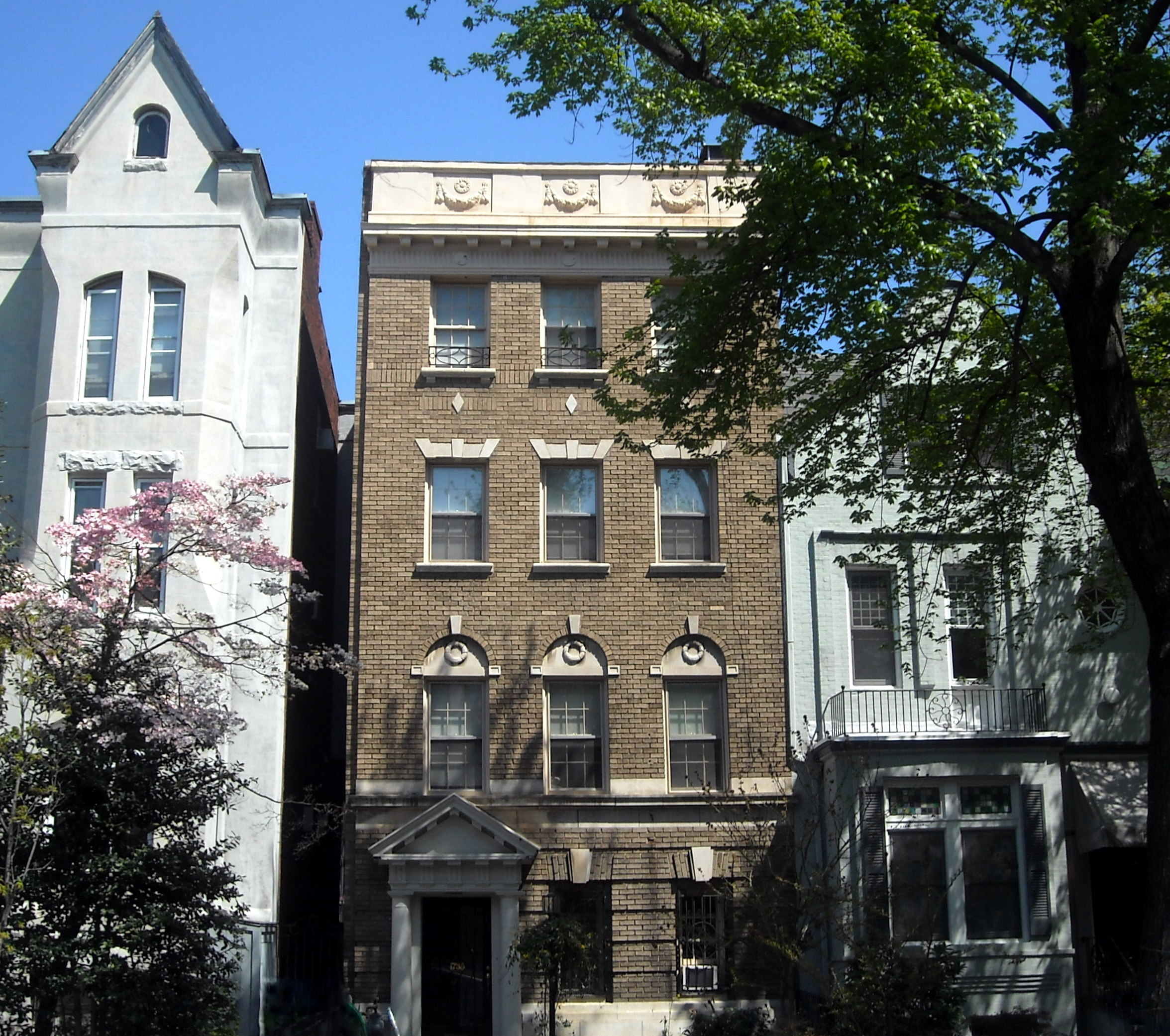
St. Thomas Parish rectory

Over the next few decades, many of the city's white residents left the city for the surrounding suburbs. As a result, St. Thomas' Parish, like many urban churches in the District of Columbia, lost many members. The social upheaval of the 1960s left its mark on Dupont Circle, as the neighborhood attracted more artists, hippies and other unconventional lifestyles.

In 1970, the original Gothic church structure was destroyed by fire as a result of arson. The vestry voted to remain in the same location and carry on an active ministry within the community. The Parish Hall, which was left standing behind the footprint of the old church, was also transformed into the simple, modern worship space parishioners used for the next 47 years. The rest of the building became a center for community meetings and various recovery groups. St. Thomas' leaders later decided to convert the area where the old church building stood into a neighborhood park.

=== 2019 church building ===
In 2009, the parish voted to rebuild the church on the site of the former building. The mixed-use plan incorporated the historic parish hall building, as well as a modern new church and a 51-unit apartment structure, to help offset the costs of rebuilding. The project broke ground in 2017.

Construction halted in 2018 due to a zoning dispute with neighbors who objected to the apartments. St. Thomas resumed construction later that year after a settlement that included charitable contributions and affordability guarantees. The project was completed in April 2019, hosting its first worship service for Easter.

== Traditions ==
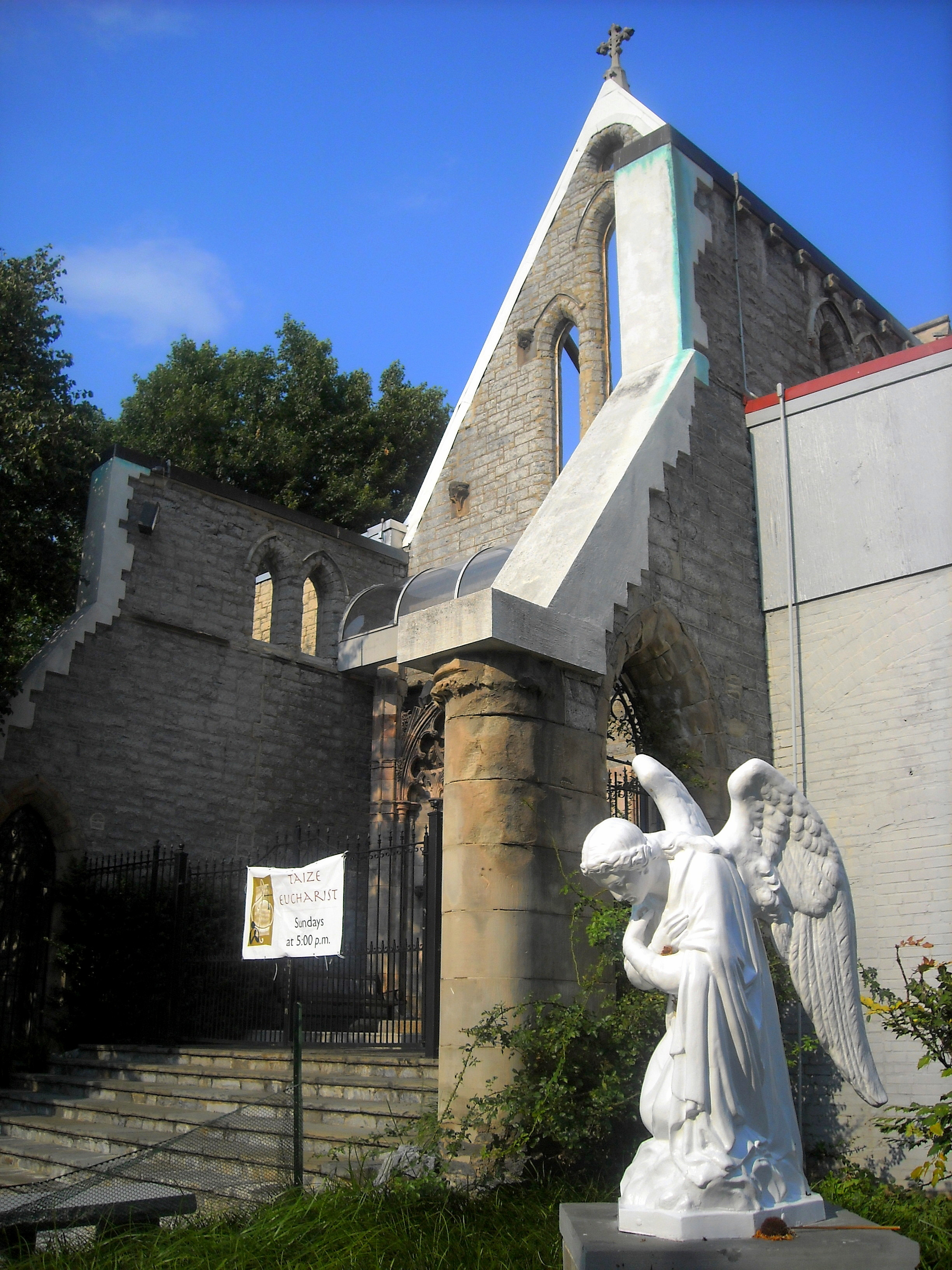
Remains of the original sanctuary

St. Thomas' has long considered itself an inclusive congregation. It supported the movements for civil rights for African Americans and women as far back as the early 1960s, and later the LGBT rights movement, due to its location in Washington, D.C.'s historic gay neighborhood. During the 1970s, St. Thomas' was one of the few churches that welcomed IntegrityUSA, an organization of gay Episcopalians who felt unwelcome in their own parishes, to celebrate Holy Eucharist in its worship space. As a result, the parish became the spiritual base for a number of gay and lesbian Episcopalians. St. Thomas' also served as a place for memorial services and funerals for people who died from AIDS, even for people who were not members

In 1992, St. Thomas' called as its rector the Rev. James Holmes, an openly gay priest in a committed relationship with his partner of more than 15 years. In 1998, St. Thomas' developed one of the earliest liturgies in the Episcopal Church for the blessing of same-sex unions.

After Rev. Holmes retired in 2002, the parish was served for the next two years by an interim rector, the Rev. Elizabeth Carl. Rev. Carl was the first woman openly living in a lesbian relationship to be ordained by the Episcopal Church.

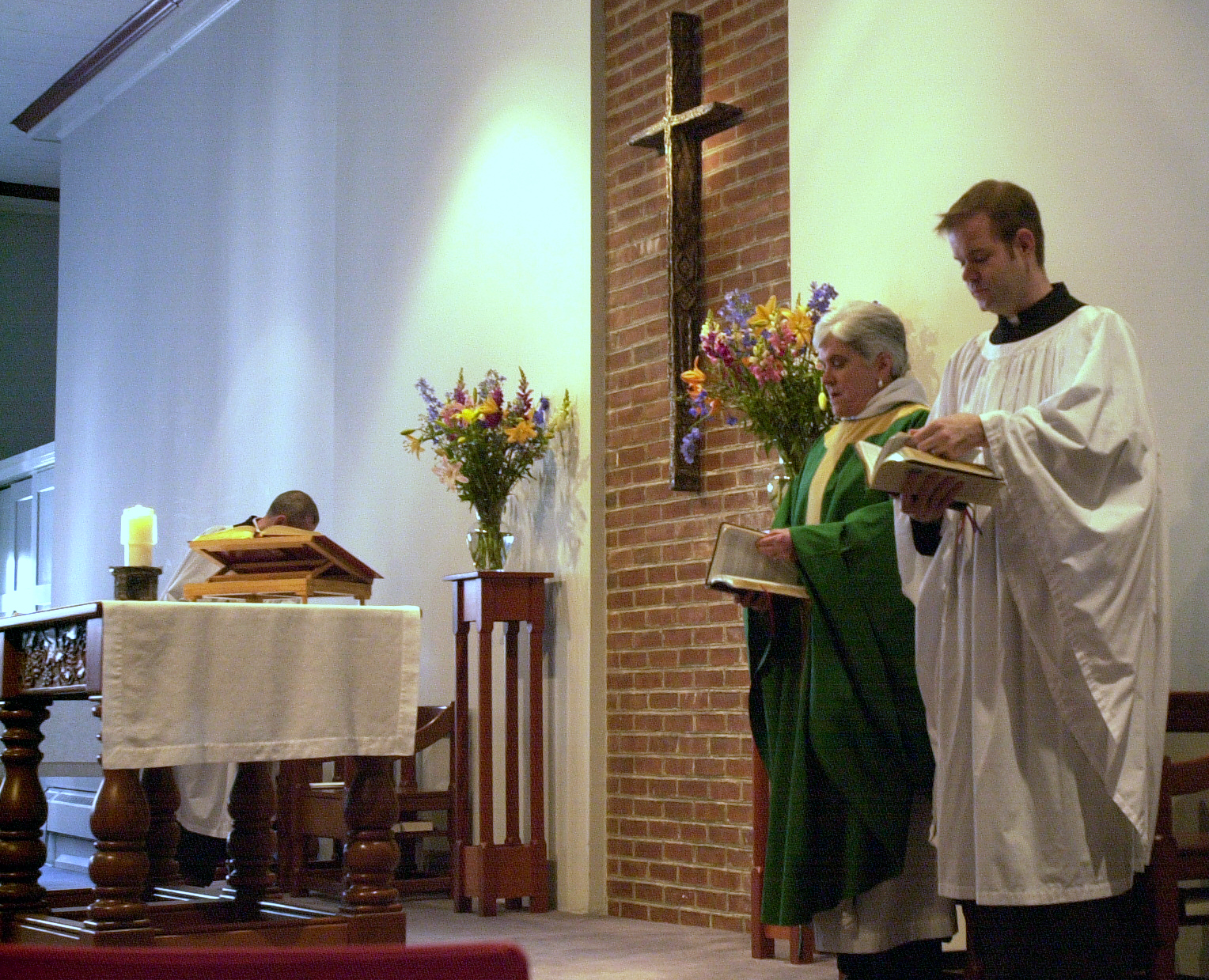
Reverend Elizabeth Carl leading a service at St. Thomas' Parish in 2004

In December 2004, the Rev. Dr. Nancy Lee Jose was called to be St. Thomas' eighth rector, and the first woman to hold that position. Jose retired in the summer of 2016. In October 2016, the Rev. Alex Dyer became the Priest in Charge.

The Rt. Rev. Gene Robinson, ninth bishop of the Episcopal Diocese of New Hampshire, has a longstanding relationship with the parish. Following his election as the first openly gay bishop in the Anglican Communion, Bishop Robinson visited St. Thomas' to talk about his personal experiences and his perspectives on the leadership of gay and lesbian persons in the church.

Upon his retirement from the New Hampshire Diocese in 2013, Robinson became a "bishop-in-residence" at St. Thomas.
