= Middle Branch Piscataquog River =

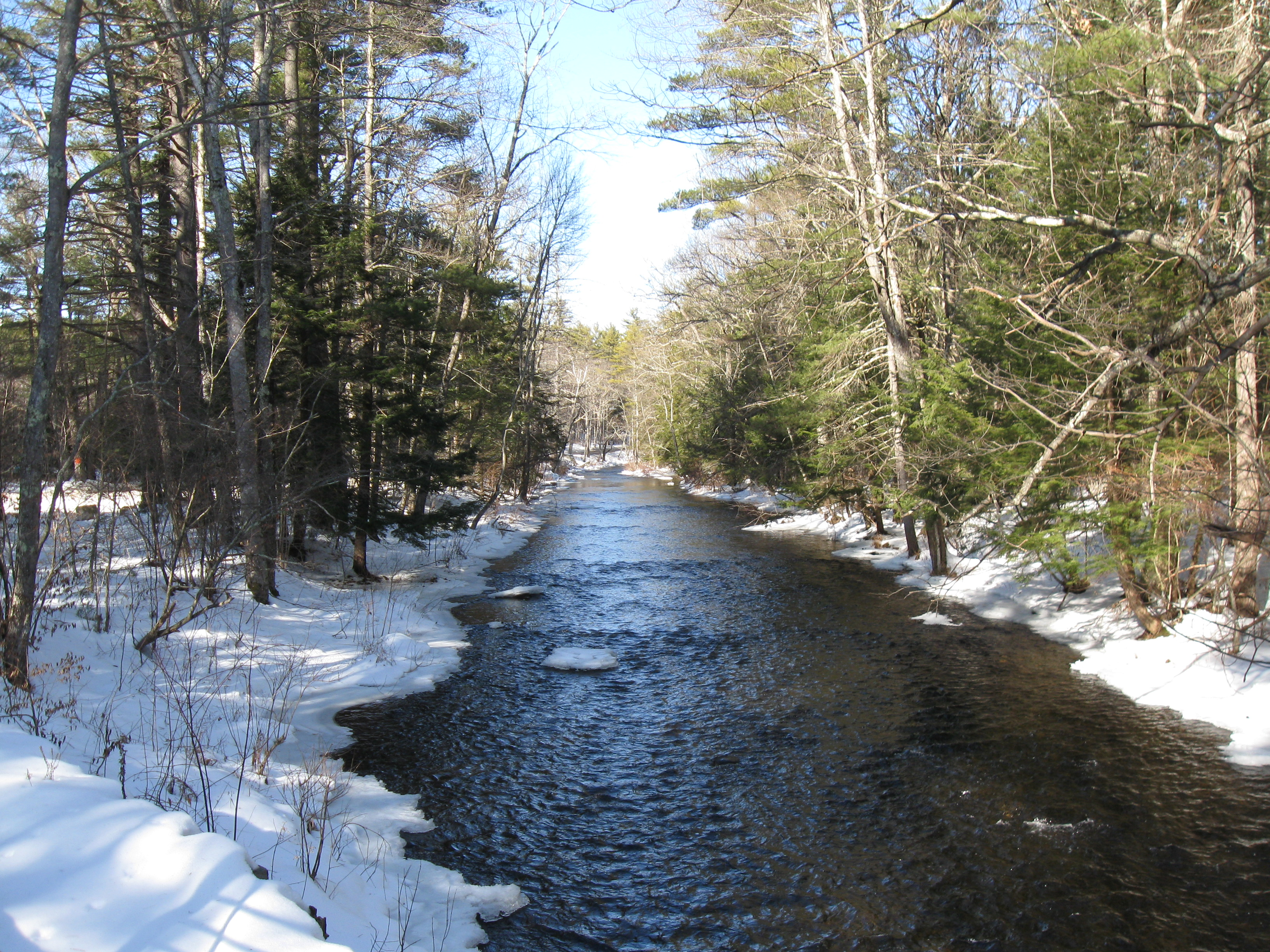
- The Middle Branch near its mouth

- Location within New Hampshire Location within the United States

Location
- Country: United States
- State: New Hampshire
- County: Hillsborough
- Towns: Francestown, New Boston, Weare

Physical characteristics
- Source: Haunted Lake
  - location: Francestown
  - coordinates: 42°59′18″N 71°45′34″W
  - elevation: 635 ft (194 m)
- Mouth: South Branch Piscataquog River
  - location: New Boston
  - coordinates: 43°0′3″N 71°39′39″W
  - elevation: 335 ft (102 m)
- Length: 10.6 mi (17.1 km)

Basin features
- Tributaries
  - left: Buxton Brook, Peacock Brook, Meadow Brook

The Middle Branch of the Piscataquog River is a 10.6-mile-long (17.1 km) river in southern New Hampshire in the United States. It is a tributary of the South Branch Piscataquog River, part of the Merrimack River watershed.

The Middle Branch begins at the outlet of Haunted Lake in the eastern part of Francestown. The river travels east-northeast through the town of New Boston, entering Weare, where it turns abruptly south to reenter New Boston and join the South Branch.

== See also ==
- List of rivers of New Hampshire
