= Winston Wilde =

Winston Wilde is a sexologist, psychotherapist, and author living in Los Angeles, California. He is the surviving partner of writer Paul Monette (1945–1995). Wilde's book, Legacies of Love: A Heritage of Queer Bonding, chronicling famous queer relationships with pictures and texts, was published in 2007 after 14 years of research.

== Work ==
Bibliography

- Wilde, Winston (2007). Legacies of Love: A Heritage of Queer Bonding. New York: Haworth Press. ISBN 978-1-56023-664-1.
- Wilde, Winston (2004). "Repairing Homophobics". Archives of Sexual Behavior. 33 (4). Springer Netherlands: 325–327. doi:10.1023/B:ASEB.0000029072.82450.85. PMID 15274234. S2CID 145137076.

Contributor

- Lassell, Michael; Schimel, Lawrence (1997). Two Hearts Desire: Gay Couples on Their Love. New York: St. Martin's Press. ISBN 0-312-15239-6.
- Lassell, Michael; Schimel, Lawrence (1997). Notes to Wake Up To. New York: St. Martin's Press. ISBN 978-0-312-15239-0.
- Shernoff, Michael (1998). Gay Widowers: Life After the Death of a Partner. New York: St. Martin's Press. ISBN 978-1-56023-105-9.
- Hamsher, Herb (2008). "Remembering Paul Monette" (.PDF). IN Los Angeles. 10 (25). OCLC 46310362.

Filmography

- Paul Monette: The Brink of Summer's End (1996) as himself
- A Girl's Guide to 21st Century Sex - TV Episode #1.6 (2006) as himself
