= Weare Reservoir =

- Lake Horace
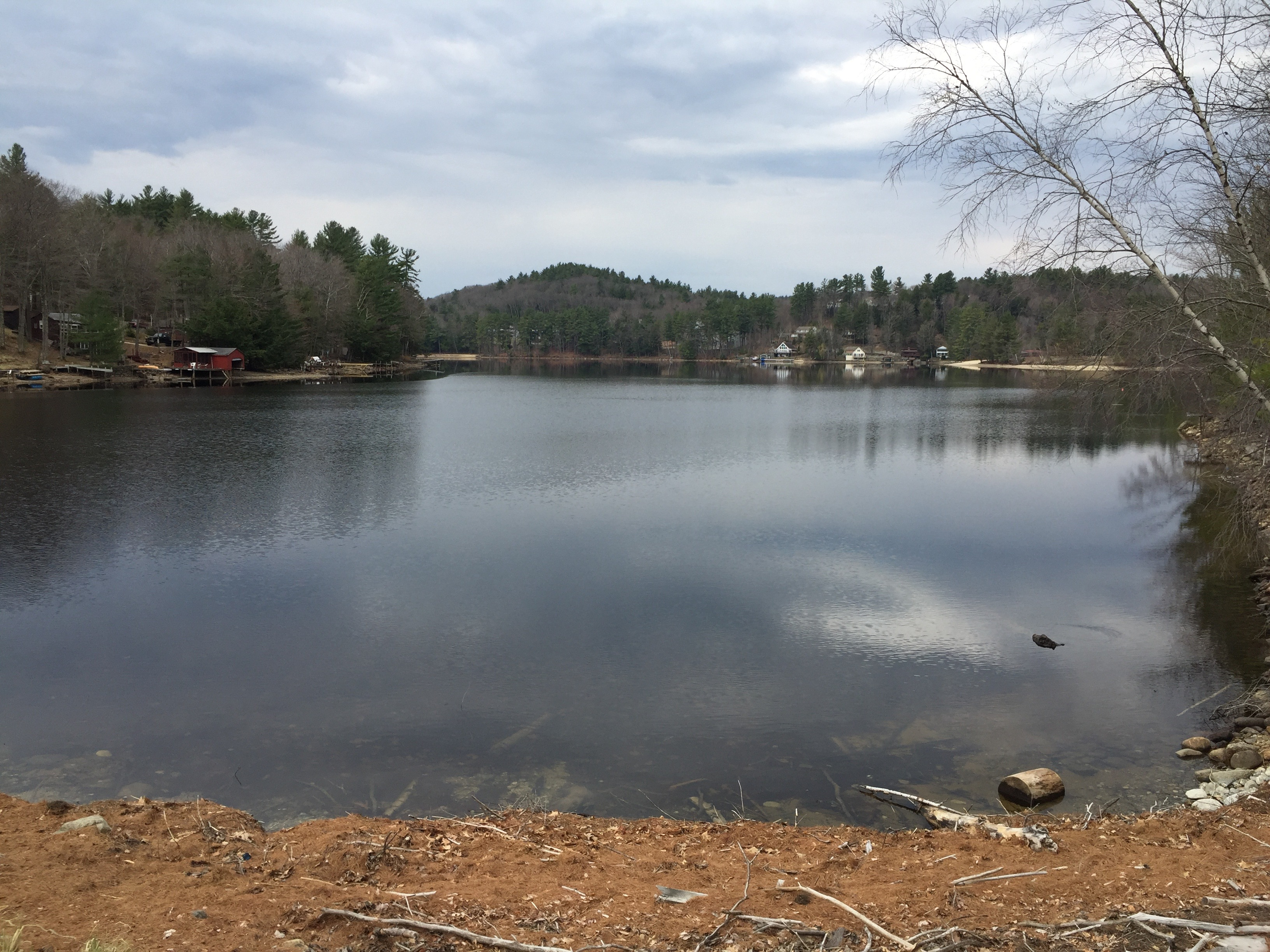
- View upstream from the dam

- Location within New Hampshire Location within the United States
- Location: Hillsborough County, New Hampshire
- Coordinates: 43°5′54″N 71°47′5″W
- Type: Reservoir
- Primary inflows: Piscataquog River
- Primary outflows: Piscataquog River
- Basin countries: United States
- Max. length: 1.9 miles (3.1 km)
- Max. width: 0.7 miles (1.1 km)
- Surface area: 268 acres (1.08 km^{2})
- Average depth: 14 ft (4.3 m)
- Max. depth: 32 ft (9.8 m)
- Surface elevation: 651 feet (198 m)
- Settlements: Weare

Weare Reservoir is a 268-acre (1.08 km^{2}) impoundment on the Piscataquog River in Hillsborough County in southern New Hampshire, United States, in the town of Weare. The reservoir is also known as Lake Horace.

It is classified as a warmwater fishery, with observed species including rainbow trout, brown trout, smallmouth and largemouth bass, chain pickerel, horned pout, and black crappie.

== See also ==
- List of lakes in New Hampshire
