= John T. Dallas =

American bishop

The Right Reverend John Thomson Dallas D.D., LL.D.
- Bishop of New Hampshire
- Church: Episcopal Church
- Diocese: New Hampshire
- Elected: December 16, 1925
- In office: 1926–1948
- Predecessor: Edward M. Parker
- Successor: Charles Francis Hall

Orders
- Ordination: May 13, 1909 by Chauncey B. Brewster
- Consecration: May 4, 1926 by John Gardner Murray

Personal details
- Born: April 15, 1880 Waterbury, Connecticut, United States
- Died: December 4, 1961 (aged 81) Concord, New Hampshire, United States
- Denomination: Anglican
- Parents: Alexander Dallas & Catherine Thomson

John Thomson Dallas (April 15, 1880 – December 4, 1961) was the fifth Bishop of New Hampshire in the Episcopal Church from 1926 to 1948.

== Biography ==
Dallas was born in Waterbury, Connecticut. He studied at Yale University from where he graduated in 1904 with a Bachelor of Arts. He graduated from Union Theological Seminary in 1908. He was ordained deacon that same year and priest a year later. He also received honorary doctorate degrees from Dartmouth College, University of Vermont, University of New Hampshire and Berkeley Divinity School. After ordination he served as curate at St John's Church in Waterbury, Connecticut. Later he served as chaplain and associate headmaster of Taft School. In 1920 he was also appointed as rector of St Thomas' Church in Hanover, New Hampshire. During the First World War he did religious work in training camps. In 1925, he was transferred as vicar of St Paul's Cathedral in Boston. In 1925 he was elected Bishop of New Hampshire; he was consecrated in 1926. He retired in 1948.
