= Carlton Chase =

American bishop

The Right Reverend Carlton Chase D.D.
- Bishop of New Hampshire
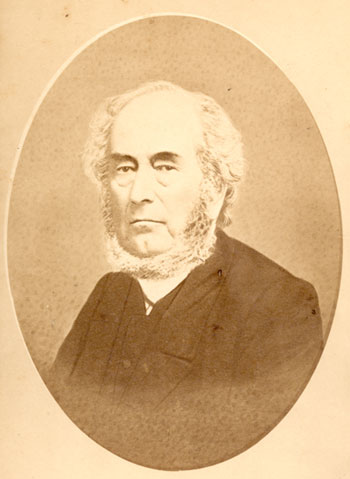
- Church: Episcopal Church
- Diocese: New Hampshire
- Elected: October 4, 1843
- In office: 1844–1870
- Predecessor: Alexander Viets Griswold
- Successor: William Woodruff Niles

Orders
- Ordination: September 27, 1820 by Alexander Viets Griswold
- Consecration: October 20, 1844 by Thomas Church Brownell

Personal details
- Born: February 20, 1794 Hopkinton, New Hampshire, United States
- Died: January 18, 1870 (aged 75) Claremont, New Hampshire, United States
- Denomination: Anglican
- Parents: Charles Chase & Sarah Currier
- Spouse: Harriet Cutler (m. September 13, 1820)
- Education: Dartmouth College (1817), University of Vermont (DD 1844)

Carlton Chase (February 20, 1794 – January 18, 1870) was the first Bishop of the Diocese of New Hampshire in the Episcopal Church in the United States of America.

== Early life ==
Chase was born in Hopkinton, New Hampshire, the son of Captain Charles Chase and Sarah (Currier) Chase. He graduated from Dartmouth College in 1817. He was ordained deacon in 1818 and ordained priest in 1820 by Alexander Viets Griswold. After his ordination, Chase moved to Bellows Falls, Vermont and became the rector of Immanuel Church. Not long after arriving in Bellows Falls, Chase married an inhabitant of that town, Harriet Cutler. They would go on to have eight children. He remained at Immanuel until his consecration as bishop in 1844, receiving a doctor of divinity during his time there from the University of Vermont.

== Bishop of New Hampshire ==
He was consecrated along with Nicholas Hamner Cobbs and Cicero S. Hawks in Philadelphia on October 20, 1844. After his elevation to the episcopate, he moved to Claremont, New Hampshire, where he also served as rector of Trinity Church. Chase made pastoral visitations to the Episcopal Diocese of New York in 1850, 1851, and 1852 in the midst of difficulties related to the trial and suspension of Bishop Benjamin Treadwell Onderdonk. He died January 18, 1870, and was buried in Claremont.
