= Sebastian F. Streeter =

American school founder, educator, historian, lawyer (1810–1864)

- Born: Sebastian Ferris Streeter; July 7, 1810; Weare, New Hampshire, U.S.
- Died: August 23, 1864 (aged 54); Baltimore, Maryland, U.S.
- Burial place: Green Mount Cemetery, Baltimore, Maryland, U.S.
- Other name: S. F. Streeter
- Education: Harvard College (BA)
- Occupations: School founder, educator, historian, lawyer, newspaper publisher
- Spouse: Elizabeth Morton Jackson (m. 1833–1864; his death)
- Children: 1

Sebastian Ferris "S. F." Streeter (July 7, 1810 – August 23, 1864) was an American school founder, educator, historian, lawyer, and newspaper publisher. He lived in Baltimore, Maryland, and wrote about the state's history.

== Early life, family and education ==
Sebastian Ferris "S.F." Streeter was born on July 7, 1810, in Weare, New Hampshire. His mother was Ruth (née Richardson) and his father, also named Sebastian Streeter (1783–1867), was a Unitarian Universalist minister at First Universalist Church in Boston.

He graduated from the Boston Latin School, where he studied under principal Benjamin A. Gould. Streeter attended Harvard College, where he graduated in 1831.

Streeter and Elizabeth Morton Jackson married on July 7, 1833, at Plymouth, Massachusetts. Together they had one daughter.

== Career ==
From 1831 to 1836, Streeter served as the vice principal at his alma mater, the Boston Latin School.

S. F. Streeter and his younger brother Leander Richardson Streeter (1812–1876) established in 1834 a newspaper called The Star (later known as the Daily Evening Star and Transcript, and as the Richmond Star) in Richmond, Virginia, however S. F. Streeter quit shortly after, leaving this newspaper business with his brother. The Richmond Star newspaper closed by 1845.

Streeter moved to Baltimore, Maryland, and joined The Baltimore Daily Transcript (later known as The Post), working with publishers Skinner & Tenny.

He and his wife established a private boarding and day school for high school girls sometime after 1836, called "Mr. and Mrs. S. F. Streeter's Boarding and Day School for Young Ladies" on Saratoga Street in Baltimore.

When the American Civil War broke out in 1861, he was a supporter of the Union. He formed the Union Relief Society in the early war. Concerned about war veterans, he and his wife established various relief institutions in Maryland.

Streeter was a founding member of the Maryland Historical Society in 1844, and served as the recording secretary. He was also the vice president of the New England Historic Genealogical Society in Boston from 1856 to 1861. At the time of his death, he was the president of the Board of School Commissioners in Baltimore.

== Death ==
After visiting wounded soldiers, Streeter died in his home in Baltimore August 23, 1864, after contracting typhoid fever. His funeral was attended by the mayor and members of the city council and school board. Streeter was buried at Green Mount Cemetery in Baltimore City.

He corresponded with George Bancroft (undated), and a letter is part of the George Bancroft papers at the Manuscripts and Archives Division of the New York Public Library.

== Published works ==
- "The Teacher's Calling" (1842), an address delivered before the Maryland Institute of Education on September 24, 1842
- Streeter, Sebastian Ferris (1852). Maryland, Two Hundred Years Ago, A Discourse. John D. Toy, Printer.; delivered to the Maryland Historical Society on May 20, 1852
- Streeter, Sebastian Ferris (1868). The First Commander of Kent Island, Volume 4, Issue 6. Baltimore, Maryland: John Murphy, Maryland Historical Society.; about William Claiborne
- Streeter, Sebastian Ferris (1876). Papers Relating to the Early History of Maryland. Baltimore, Maryland: John Murphy, Maryland Historical Society.
