= South Branch Piscataquog River =

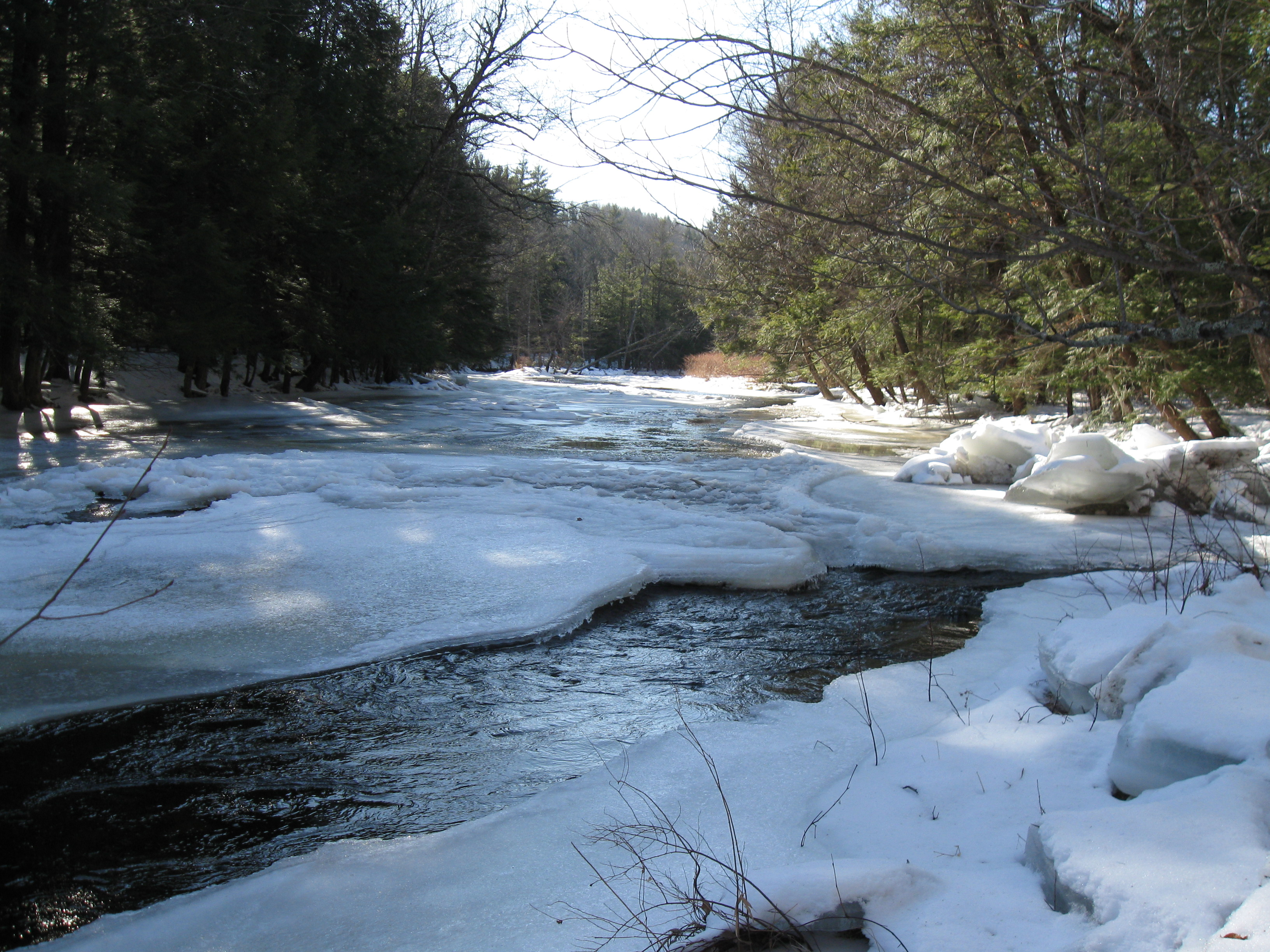
- The South Branch in New Boston, NH

- Location within New Hampshire Location within the United States

Location
- Country: United States
- State: New Hampshire
- County: Hillsborough
- Towns: Francestown, Lyndeborough, New Boston, Goffstown

Physical characteristics
- Source: Pleasant Pond
  - location: Francestown
  - coordinates: 43°1′27″N 71°49′3″W
  - elevation: 817 ft (249 m)
- Mouth: Piscataquog River
  - location: Goffstown
  - coordinates: 43°1′23″N 71°37′23″W
  - elevation: 290 ft (88 m)
- Length: 20.5 mi (33.0 km)

Basin features
- Tributaries
  - left: Middle Branch Piscataquog
  - right: Collins Brook, Rand Brook, Cold Brook, Lords Brook, Meadow Brook

The South Branch of the Piscataquog River is a 20.5-mile-long (33.0 km) river located in southern New Hampshire in the United States. It is a tributary of the Piscataquog River, part of the Merrimack River watershed.

The South Branch of the Piscataquog begins at the outlet of Pleasant Pond in Francestown, New Hampshire. The river travels south-southeast until entering New Boston, where it turns northeast to flow to the Piscataquog River just over the town line in Goffstown. For most of its route, the South Branch passes through rolling, hilly country, occasionally dropping over small waterfalls. New Hampshire Route 13 follows the river closely from New Boston to Goffstown.

== See also ==
- List of rivers of New Hampshire
