= Four-fold Franciscan prayer =

Four-fold Franciscan prayer is a devotional discipline derived from teachings of Francis of Assisi and Clare of Assisi, and described as divided into a sequence of "gazing, considering, contemplating, and imitating".

Episcopal Bishop Gene Robinson gave widened visibility to the method in describing the unbroadcast invocation he delivered in connection with the Obama inauguration as designed around it.
