= William Woodruff Niles =

Canadian bishop

The Right Reverend William Woodruff Niles D.D., D.C.L., LL.D.
- Bishop of New Hampshire
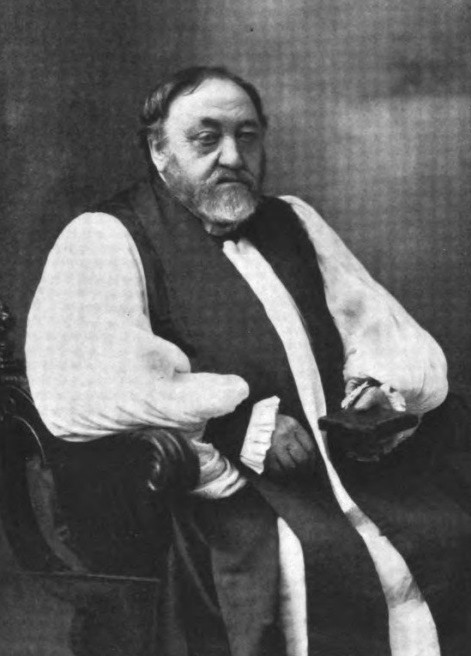
- Province: Episcopal Church
- Diocese: New Hampshire
- Elected: May 25, 1870
- In office: 1870–1914
- Predecessor: Carlton Chase
- Successor: Edward M. Parker

Orders
- Ordination: May 14, 1862 by George Burgess
- Consecration: September 21, 1870 by Benjamin B. Smith

Personal details
- Born: May 24, 1832 Hatley, Quebec, Canada
- Died: March 31, 1914 (aged 81) Concord, New Hampshire, United States
- Buried: Saint Paul's School Cemetery Concord, New Hampshire
- Denomination: Anglican
- Parents: Daniel Swift Niles & Delia Woodruff
- Spouse: Bertha Olmsted
- Children: 6
- Education: Trinity College and Berkeley Divinity School

William Woodruff Niles (May 24, 1832 - March 31, 1914) was the third bishop of the Episcopal Diocese of New Hampshire, United States, and served as such from 1870 until his death in 1914.

== Early life and education ==
William Woodruff Niles was born in Hatley, Quebec, Canada, the son of Daniel Swift Niles (1775-1860) and his wife Della (Woodruff) Niles (1788-1871). After studying at the Derby Academy in Derby, Vermont, he attended Trinity College from which he received an A.B. in 1857 and an A.M. in 1860. In 1861 he graduated from Berkeley Divinity School, which was then located in Middletown, Connecticut.

== Career ==
William Woodruff Niles was ordained a deacon on May 22, 1861 at Holy Trinity Episcopal Church in Middletown and a priest on May 14, 1862 at St. Philip's Episcopal Church in Wiscasset, Maine. He had been deacon in charge of St. Philip's and became its rector when he was ordained a priest. In 1864 he returned to Trinity College to become professor of Latin. In 1868 he also became part-time rector of St. John's Episcopal Church in Warehouse Point, Connecticut. On September 21, 1870, he was consecrated bishop of New Hampshire at St. Paul's Episcopal Church in Concord, New Hampshire. Bishop Niles assumed the unpaid rectorship of St. Paul's Church in Concord and continued in both capacities until his death. In 1879, under his leadership, members of the 1875 Episcopal General Convention founded the Holderness School in New Hampshire, where a living hall was named in his honor.

== Marriage and family ==
Niles was married to Bertha Olmsted (1834-1926), the half-sister of landscape architect Frederick Law Olmsted, on June 5, 1862 in Hartford, Connecticut. They had six children.

== Honors ==
Bishop Niles received honorary degrees from Trinity, Dartmouth College, Berkeley Divinity School and Bishop's College in Sherbrooke, Quebec.
