= A. Robert Hirschfeld =

American Episcopal bishop

The Right Reverend A. Robert Hirschfeld
- Bishop of New Hampshire
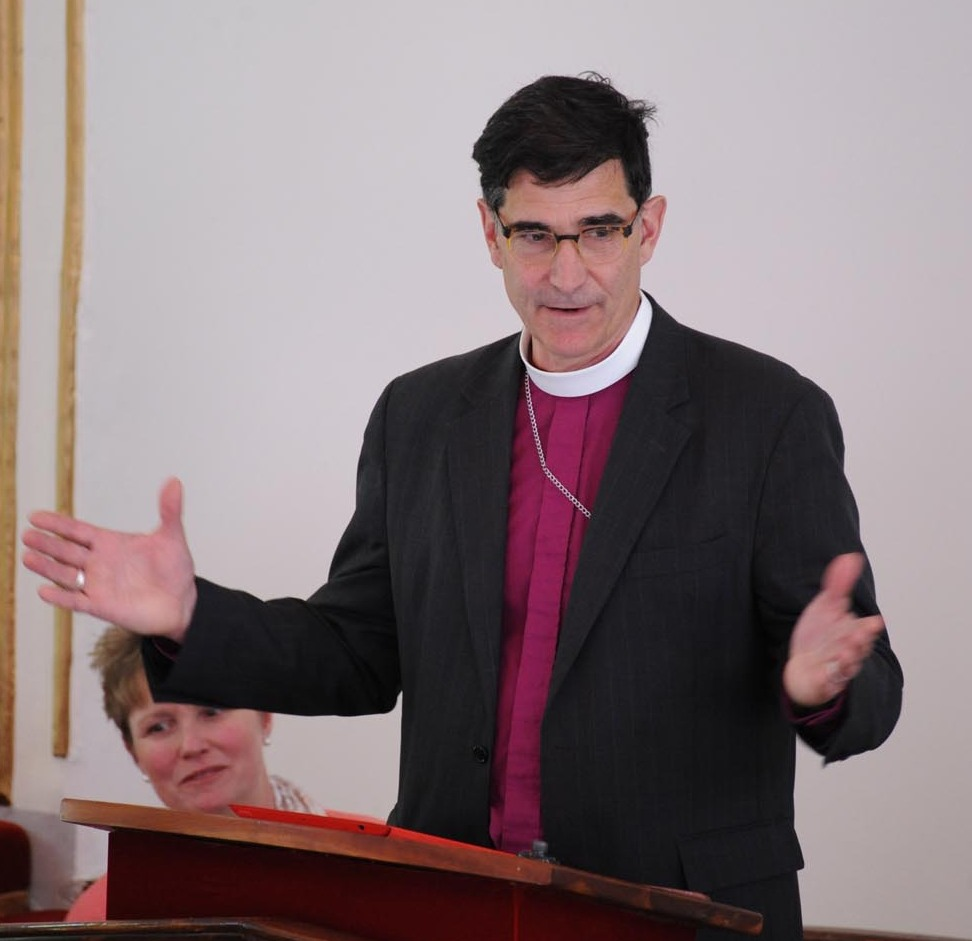
- Church: Episcopal Church
- Diocese: New Hampshire
- Elected: May 19, 2012
- In office: 2013–present
- Predecessor: Gene Robinson
- Previous post: Coadjutor Bishop of New Hampshire (2012–2013)

Orders
- Ordination: January 18, 1992
- Consecration: August 4, 2012 by Katharine Jefferts Schori

Personal details
- Born: January 10, 1961 (age 65) Red Wing, Minnesota, United States
- Denomination: Anglicanism
- Spouse: Polly Merritt Ingraham
- Children: 3
- Education: Dartmouth College; Berkeley Divinity School

A. Robert Hirschfeld (born January 10, 1961) is a bishop in the Episcopal Church in the United States. In 2013 he became the tenth and current bishop of the Diocese of New Hampshire.

== Early life and education ==
Hirschfeld graduated from Dartmouth College in 1983. He has a master's degree in divinity from Berkeley Divinity School at Yale.

== Ordained ministry ==
Hirschfeld was ordained in the Episcopal Church (United States) on January 18, 1992. He took a post as vice chaplain at Christ Church in New Haven, Connecticut. Following his work at Christ Church, he was Vicar/Chaplain and later rector of St. Mark's Episcopal Chapel on the campus of the University of Connecticut in Storrs. He was next called as the pastor of Grace Church in Amherst, Massachusetts.

Hirschfeld was elected bishop coadjutor of the Episcopal Diocese of New Hampshire on May 19, 2012. On August 4, 2012, he was consecrated as a bishop in Concord, New Hampshire with Presiding Bishop Katharine Jefferts Schori as chief consecrator. Since 2013, he has served as diocesan bishop, and replaced the previous bishop, Gene Robinson, on his retirement in January 2013.

== Personal life ==
Hirschfeld is married to Polly Ingraham, and the couple have three children.

== See also ==
- List of Episcopal bishops of the United States
- Historical list of the Episcopal bishops of the United States
