= Philip Alan Smith =

American bishop

The Right Reverend Philip Alan Smith D.D.
- Bishop of New Hampshire
- Church: Episcopal Church
- Diocese: New Hampshire
- Elected: October 7, 1972
- In office: 1973–1986
- Predecessor: Charles Francis Hall
- Successor: Douglas E. Theuner
- Previous posts: Suffragan Bishop of Virginia (1970-1972); Coadjutor Bishop of Virginia (1972-1973)

Orders
- Ordination: December 1949 by John M. Walker
- Consecration: January 28, 1970 by John E. Hines

Personal details
- Born: April 2, 1920 Belmont, Massachusetts, United States
- Died: October 10, 2010 (aged 90) Alexandria, Virginia, United States
- Denomination: Anglican
- Parents: Herbert Leonard Smith & Elizabeth MacDonald
- Spouse: Barbara Taylor Smith (m. June 12, 1949)
- Children: 4

Philip Alan Smith (April 2, 1920 – October 10, 2010) was the seventh bishop of New Hampshire in the Episcopal Church.

== Education ==
Smith was born on April 2, 1920, in Belmont, Massachusetts, the son of Herbert Smith and Elizabeth McDonald. He was educated at Belmont High School after which he enrolled in a B.A course with Harvard University from which he graduated in 1942. During the war, Smith served as an officer with an Army antiaircraft unit in Europe and received the Bronze Star Medal. In 1949 he graduated with a Bachelor of Divinity from Virginia Theological Seminary. Between 1957 and 1958 he studied at St Augustine's College, Canterbury in England. He received his Doctor of Divinity from the Virginia Seminary in 1970.

== Ordination ==
Smith was ordained deacon in June 1949 and priest in December 1949. His first assignment was as curate of All Saints' Church in Atlanta, Georgia. Between 1952 and 1959 he served as rector of Christ Church in Exeter, New Hampshire and later became assistant professor of pastoral theology at Virginia Theological Seminary. In 1962 he was appointed chaplain of the seminary and in 1967 associate dean of students.

== Bishop ==
Smith was elected Suffragan Bishop of Virginia in 1970 and was consecrated in the Washington National Cathedral by the Presiding Bishop John E. Hines. In 1972 he was elected Bishop of New Hampshire. Smith was involved in the debates concerning the decision of the National Church to ordain women. He was also instrumental in the revision of the Prayer Book, and the production of the 1982 Hymnal. He retired in 1986. Smith died on October 10, 2010, at the Goodwin House retirement in Alexandria, Virginia after complications due to Lung cancer. He was married to Barbara Taylor Smith, who died in 2007, and together had 4 children, one of whom died in infancy.
