= Douglas E. Theuner =

American bishop (1938–2013)

The Right Reverend Douglas Edwin Theuner L.H.D.
- Bishop of New Hampshire
- Church: Episcopal Church
- Diocese: New Hampshire
- Elected: November 23, 1985
- In office: 1986–2003
- Predecessor: Philip Alan Smith
- Successor: Gene Robinson

Orders
- Ordination: December 1962 by Nelson M. Burroughs
- Consecration: April 19, 1986 by Edmond L. Browning

Personal details
- Born: November 15, 1938 The Bronx, New York, United States
- Died: November 8, 2013 (aged 74) Concord, New Hampshire, United States
- Denomination: Anglican
- Parents: Grace Elizabeth McKean & Alfred Edwin Kipp Theuner
- Spouse: Jane Lois Szuhany
- Children: 2

Douglas Edwin "Doug" Theuner (November 15, 1938 - November 8, 2013) was the eighth diocesan bishop of New Hampshire in the Episcopal Church, serving from 1986 to 2003.

== Education ==
Theuner was born on November 15, 1938, in The Bronx, New York, the son of Grace Elizabeth McKean and Alfred Edwin Kipp Theuner. He graduated with a Bachelor of Arts from the College of Wooster and a Bachelor of Divinity from Bexley Hall. He also earned a Master of Arts in history from the University of Connecticut and in 2000, was awarded an honorary Doctor of Humane Letters by Cuttington University.

== Ordination and Ministry ==
Theuner was ordained to the diaconate in June 1962 and to the priesthood in December 1962 by the Bishop of Ohio Nelson M. Burroughs. His ministry was centered mainly in Ohio and Connecticut, the last post being as rector of St John's Church in Stamford, Connecticut.

== Bishop ==
Theuner was elected Coadjutor Bishop of New Hampshire on November 23, 1985, at a special session of the 183rd convention which took place at Grace Church, Manchester, New Hampshire. He was consecrated on April 19, 1986, in St Joseph Roman Catholic Cathedral in Manchester. He succeeded as diocesan bishop that same year. As bishop he was very supportive of the inclusion of homosexual people, and was a fierce supporter of the election and consecration of his successor Gene Robinson to be the first openly gay bishop in the Episcopal Church. He was also involved in committees specializing in AIDS, human sexuality, family planning and Planned Parenthood. Theuner retired in 2003. He died ten years later on November 8, 2013.

== Personal life ==
Theuner married Jane Lois Szuhany and together they had two children.
