= Gene Robinson =

Bishop of the Episcopal Diocese of New Hampshire (born 1947)

The Right Reverend Gene Robinson
- Bishop emeritus of New Hampshire
- Robinson in 2026
- Church: Episcopal Church
- Diocese: New Hampshire
- Elected: June 7, 2003
- Installed: March 7, 2004
- Term ended: January 5, 2013
- Predecessor: Douglas E. Theuner
- Successor: A. Robert Hirschfeld

Orders
- Ordination: December 15, 1973 by George Rath
- Consecration: November 2, 2003 by Frank Griswold

Personal details
- Born: Vicky Gene Robinson; May 29, 1947 (age 79) Lexington, Kentucky, U.S.
- Denomination: Anglican
- Spouse: Isabella Martin (m. 1972; div. 1986); Mark Andrew (m. 2008; div. 2014)
- Children: 2
- Profession: Clergyman
- Education: Sewanee: The University of the South; General Theological Seminary

Vicky Gene Robinson (Note: Robinson states his birth name as Vicky Gene Robinson from his grandfather Victor and his mother Imogene; as a baby he was not expected to survive and his parents were expecting a girl. Various sources also reported "Vicki" and "Imogene". Robinson and most reliable sources use V. Gene Robinson.) (born May 29, 1947) is a retired bishop of the Episcopal Diocese of New Hampshire. Robinson was elected bishop coadjutor in 2003 and succeeded as bishop diocesan in March 2004. Before becoming bishop, he served as Canon to the Ordinary for the Diocese of New Hampshire.

Robinson is widely known for being the first openly gay priest to be consecrated a bishop in a major Christian denomination believing in the historic episcopate, a matter of significant controversy. (Note: Otis Charles was bishop of the Episcopal Diocese of Utah from 1971 to 1986. After his retirement, in 1993, Charles publicly came out as a gay man, the first Christian bishop ever to take such a step.) After his election, many theologically traditional Episcopalians in the United States abandoned the Mainline Protestant Episcopal Church, formed the Anglican Church in North America (ACNA) and aligned themselves with bishops outside the Episcopal Church in the United States, a process called the Anglican realignment. His story has appeared in print and film.

In 2010, Robinson announced his intention to retire in 2013 at 65. His successor is A. Robert Hirschfeld.

== Early life ==
Robinson's parents were poor tenant farmers in Lexington, Kentucky, who worked in the tobacco fields as sharecroppers. The family used an outhouse, drew water from a cistern, and did laundry in a cast-iron tub over an open flame. Their house did not have running water until Robinson was ten years old. When Robinson was born, he was so seriously ill that the doctor was certain he would not survive. He was temporarily paralyzed from birth and his head was misshapen. So likely was Robinson's death that the physician asked Robinson's father Charles for a name for the baby's birth and death certificates. Robinson's parents were young (his mother Imogene was twenty) and they were hoping for a girl. They named the baby "Vicky Gene Robinson" for Charles' father Victor and the baby's mother Imogene. For a long time, Robinson's parents believed the boy would die soon. Much later in life, Robinson's father would tell him he couldn't take any joy in the boy's development because he always thought each step was going to be the last thing. Robinson's parents were members of a small Disciples of Christ congregation. Robinson describes his childhood as very religious. He had perfect Sunday School attendance for thirteen years.

== Education and marriage ==
Robinson chose the University of the South in Sewanee, Tennessee, in 1965 because they offered him a full scholarship. Robinson intended to study towards a medical degree but decided to major in American studies. During his college days, Robinson began to seriously consider the ordained ministry and said it almost immediately felt right. During high school and then college, Robinson had been exploring philosophical and theological questions and has said, "The Episcopal Church got a hold on me." He graduated from Sewanee cum laude with a Bachelor of Arts degree in American studies in 1969 and attended seminary that fall. Robinson studied for a Master of Divinity degree from the Episcopal General Theological Seminary in New York City.

While doing an intern year as a chaplain at the University of Vermont, he began dating his future wife, Isabella "Boo" Martin. Robinson says that about "a month into their relationship, [he] explained his background and his fears about his sexuality." They continued dating and, as Robinson puts it, "about a month before the marriage, [he] became frightened that ... this thing would raise its ugly head some day, and cause her and me great pain." Robinson and Martin discussed it and decided to go ahead with the marriage in 1972.

== Early career and children ==
Robinson received his degree in 1973 and was ordained a deacon in June 1973 at the cathedral of the diocese of Newark, New Jersey. He served as curate at Christ Church in Ridgewood, New Jersey, and was ordained a priest six months later. He and his wife remained at the Ridgewood parish for two years until June 1975. They then moved to New Hampshire, where Boo had grown up. Their goal was to start a business and ministry: In the winter it was called "The Sign of the Dove Retreat Center" and in the summer it became "Pony Farm". Boo still runs "Pony Farm" as a horse camp for children.

In 1977, Robinson began working with a committee in the Diocese of New Hampshire to study human sexuality and co-authored a small manual on the subject. Robinson and Boo's first daughter, Jamee, was born in 1977, followed by a second daughter, Ella, in 1981. Robinson treasures his marriage stating, "[T]hat is inextricably tied up with having children. And since I cannot imagine my life without Jamee and Ella, it's just a completely irrelevant question for me. And I don't regret having been married to Boo, either, even if there had not been children. It's just a part of my journey, and why would I possibly regret that?"

== Coming out and career ==
Robinson came out to his and Boo's friends in 1986 and he sold his share in the business to Boo. They remained friends.

In November 1987, Robinson met his partner, Mark Andrew, while on vacation in St. Croix. Andrew worked in Washington, D.C., at the national office of the Peace Corps. On July 2, 1988, Robinson and Andrew moved into a new house in Weare, New Hampshire and had it blessed by Bishop Douglas E. Theuner, an event which they considered to be the formal recognition of their life together. The couple were legally joined in June 2008 in a private civil union ceremony in St. Paul's Church, Concord. Earlier, Robinson had said, "I always wanted to be a June bride." Robinson and Andrew divorced in 2014.

Robinson became Canon to the Ordinary in 1988, the executive assistant to the then bishop of New Hampshire, Douglas Theuner. Robinson remained in this job for the next fifteen years until he was elected bishop.

Robinson and his daughters are very close. Ella helped her father with public relations at the General Convention in 2003. Just a week before, his daughter Jamee had given birth to his first granddaughter.

== Election as bishop ==
Robinson was elected bishop by the New Hampshire diocese on June 7, 2003, at St. Paul's Church in Concord. Thirty-nine clergy votes and 83 lay votes were the threshold necessary to elect a bishop in the Diocese of New Hampshire at that time. The clergy cast 58 votes for Robinson, and the laity voted 96 for Robinson on the second ballot. The Episcopal Church requires in its Canon 16 that the election procedure and the candidate who is elected be subjected to review and must be consented to by the national church. No objections were raised to the procedure of the election. If diocesan election occurred within 120 days (3 months) of a General Convention, canon law requires consent by the House of Deputies and then the House of Bishops at the General Convention itself. Consent to the election of Robinson was given in August at the 2003 General Convention. The General Convention of 2003 became the center for debate over Robinson's election, as conservatives and liberals within the Church argued over whether Robinson should be allowed to become bishop. Some conservative factions threatened a schism within both the Episcopal Church and the Anglican Communion should Robinson be elected. Before the House of Deputies can vote on a resolution, a legislative committee must examine the piece of legislation first. The Committee on the Consecration of Bishops held a two-hour hearing on Robinson's election and supporters and opponents were allowed to speak. One of the speakers was Robinson's daughter, Ella, who read a letter from his ex-wife Boo in strong support of Robinson. The House of Deputies, which consists of laypersons and priests, voted in the affirmative: the laity voted 63 in favor, 32 opposed, and 13 divided; the clergy voted 65 in favor, 31 opposed, and 12 divided.

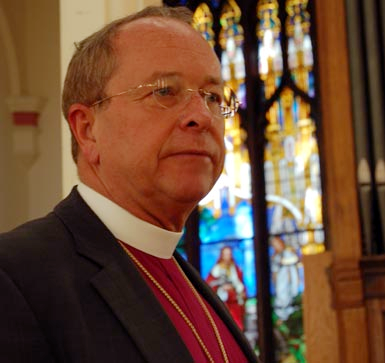
Bishop Robinson in 2005

Robinson won the first two of three votes required for his election to be ratified, but allegations suddenly arose in August 2003 that Robinson had inappropriately touched a male parishioner and had connections with OutRight.org, which at the time carried a link to AllThingsBi.com, a resource site for bisexual people that included links to pornography sites. The final vote was postponed to address these last-minute charges. David W. Virtue, a critic of gay ordination, brought up the pornography allegation, claiming that: "Gene Robinson's website is linked by one click to 5,000 pornographic websites." When no such link was found on the Diocese of New Hampshire web page profiling the bishop-elect, Virtue stated that the link was on the website of an organization Robinson supported. Robinson was already known to be associated with Outright, a secular organization for the support of young LGBT people. Fred Barnes, a Fox News commentator, repeated the allegations on the website of The Weekly Standard. On the day the allegations arose, the website issued a press release stating that it had removed the offending link, that it had been unaware of the pornographic links on allthingsbi.com, and that Robinson had no involvement with that particular chapter of Outright.

The male parishioner of Manchester, Vermont (in a diocese neighboring Robinson's) who had alleged the "touching" was then reported to have said, during the investigating committee's telephone call with him, that the acts in question were two separate occasions of what felt to him like intentionally seductive arm-squeezing and back-stroking, albeit in a public setting. The man acknowledged that while others might have regarded the two incidents as "natural", the incidents were disturbing to him nonetheless. The investigating committee's report also stated that the man regretted having used the word "harassment" in his e-mail, and that the man declined an invitation to bring formal charges. After a two-day investigation, neither allegation proved of merit. The House of Bishops voted for Robinson in the affirmative, with 62 in favor, 43 opposed, and 2 abstaining.

== Consecration as bishop ==
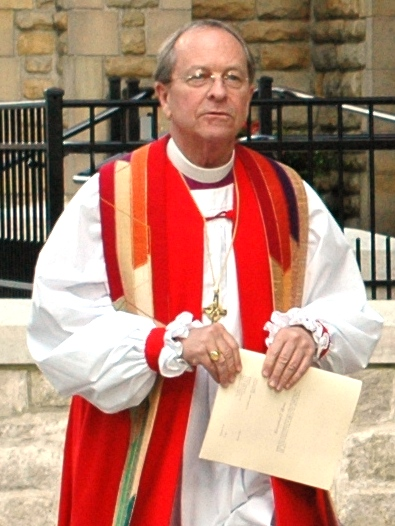
Bishop Robinson in 2006, during the 75th General Convention of The Episcopal Church

The election in New Hampshire, like all elections of bishops in the Episcopal Church, was done by a synodical election process, unlike many other parts of the Anglican Communion where bishops are appointed. This detail would be misunderstood when the international commentary following Robinson's election suggested he should voluntarily step down or be asked to do so. The Jeffrey John case in the Church of England is the best example to contrast the election of bishops with the appointment of bishops. Jeffrey John is an openly gay priest living in a long-standing celibate relationship (he self-identifies as celibate) and was appointed as a bishop. One person alone, Richard Harries, then Bishop of Oxford, had the authority to appoint the Bishop of Reading (an area bishop in Oxford diocese), though new bishops are customarily consecrated by the archbishop. Rowan Williams, then Archbishop of Canterbury, however, allegedly persuaded Harries to not proceed with the appointment. This precedent would be used by the wider Anglican Communion to pressure Robinson. Robinson said that "there was not a single bishop involved in the choosing of me to be Bishop of New Hampshire."

The Elections and Transitions Committee arranged for the Whittemore Center to be used for the consecration, a large hockey rink on the campus of the University of New Hampshire in Durham. The numbers expected were about 3,000 people, 300 press, a 200-strong choir, and 48 bishops. The security was strong: just as Barbara Harris had to wear a bullet-proof vest at her consecration, Robinson was showing his bullet-proof vest to Harris herself. Robinson's parents, sister, daughter and their families and his ex-wife Boo were all at the consecration. Robinson was consecrated on November 2, 2003, in the presence of Frank Griswold, Presiding Bishop, and six co-consecrating bishops: 48 bishops in all.

Robinson's election and consecration prompted a group of 19 bishops, led by Robert Duncan, Bishop of the Diocese of Pittsburgh, to make a statement warning the church of a possible schism between the Episcopal Church and the Anglican Communion. Rowan Williams, Archbishop of Canterbury, stated that "[it] will inevitably have a significant impact on the Anglican Communion throughout the world and it is too early to say what the result of that will be." He added: "[I]t is my hope that the church in America and the rest of the Anglican Communion will have the opportunity to consider this development before significant and irrevocable decisions are made in response." Desmond Tutu, Archbishop emeritus of Cape Town, stated that he did not see what "all the fuss" was about, saying the election would not roil the Church of the Province of Southern Africa. Other senior bishops of the church, like Peter Akinola, Archbishop of the Church of Nigeria and head of the Global South, have made Robinson a figurehead in their dispute with the Episcopal Church. Some disaffected Episcopalian congregations disaffiliated from the Episcopal Church and formed the Convocation of Anglicans in North America with the support of the Nigerian church, later reorganized as the Anglican Church in North America.

== Episcopate ==
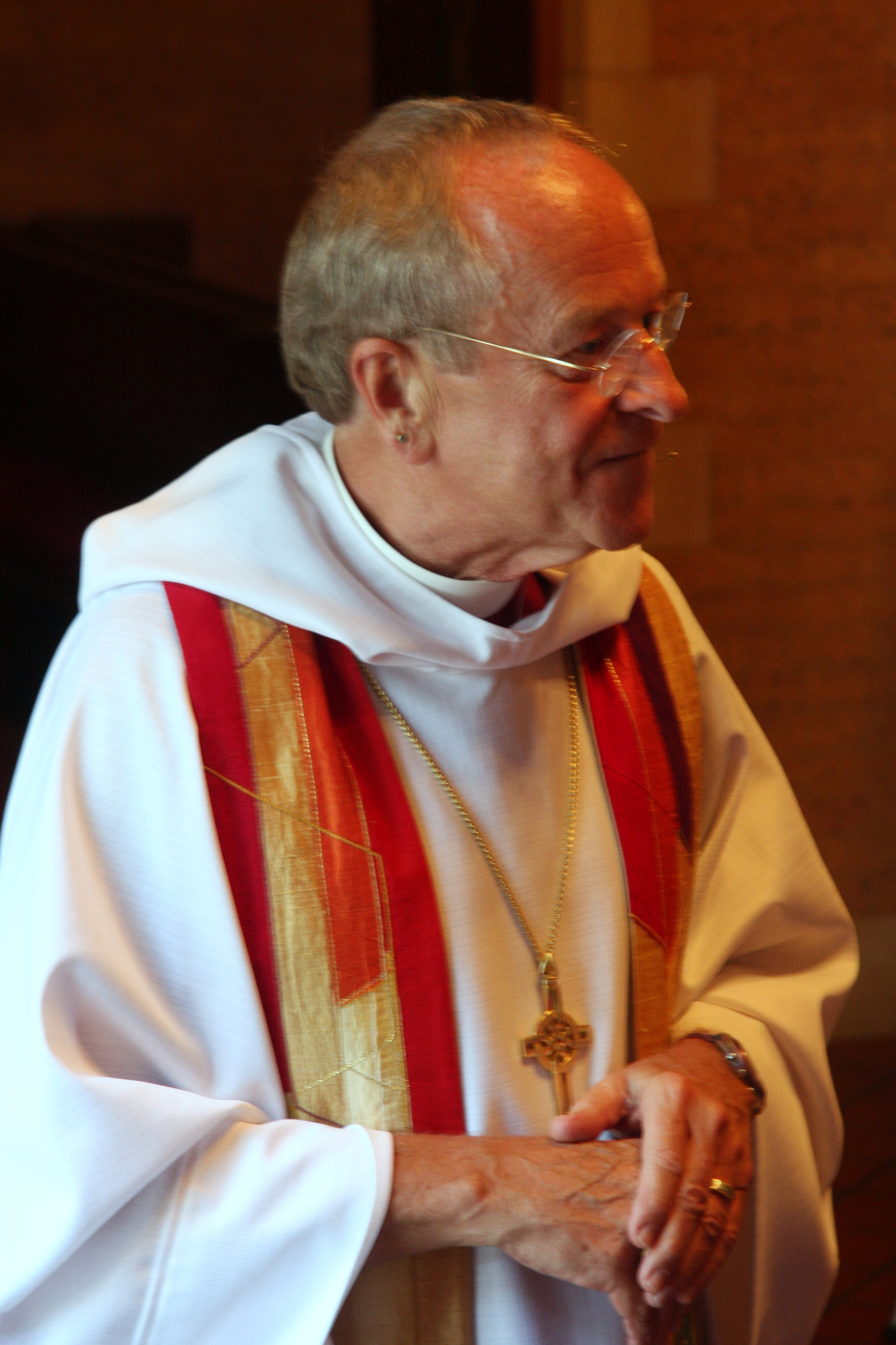
Bishop Robinson in 2013

Reports from Britain describe how Robinson has received death threats, had to wear bulletproof vests, and needed protection since his election and consecration.

In February 2006, Robinson was treated at an inpatient rehabilitation facility to deal with his "increasing dependence on alcohol". Diocesan officials were surprised by the news and asserted that they did not notice his alcoholism affect his ministry in any way. The Episcopal Church, through its General Convention, has long recognized alcoholism as a treatable human disease, not a failure of character or will. The members of the Standing Committee issued a statement fully supporting Robinson. He returned to work in March 2006.

Robinson was featured prominently in a documentary film entitled For the Bible Tells Me So, which screened at the 2007 Sundance Film Festival.

He has opposed the Roman Catholic ban on homosexual seminarians, stating: "I find it so vile that they think they are going to end the child abuse scandal by throwing out homosexuals from seminaries."

Due to the controversy surrounding his consecration, Bishop Robinson was not invited to the 2008 Lambeth Conferences by the Archbishop of Canterbury, Rowan Williams. A group of conservative bishops (including Akinola and Duncan) who opposed Robinson's consecration gathered in Jerusalem one month prior to Lambeth 2008, at the Global Anglican Future Conference, an event which is perceived by some as schismatic.

Robinson did however visit the United Kingdom privately in July 2008, during which he participated in a film screening and question and answer session with Sir Ian McKellen at the Royal Festival Hall, and was invited to preach at St Mary's Putney, events which attracted much media attention. The sermon was interrupted by a heckler who was then escorted out of the service. Robinson asked the rest of the congregation, most of whom greeted the interruption with slow-clapping, to "pray for that man", before completing his sermon. The Primate of the Episcopal Church of the Sudan, Archbishop Daniel Deng Bul, on July 22 at a public press conference during the 2008 Lambeth Conference called for Robinson to resign, and for all those who had participated in his consecration to confess their sin to the conference.

In 2009 Robinson was selected to deliver the invocation at the kickoff event of President Barack Obama's inaugural weekend. Despite his extended involvement with Obama during the campaign, his selection was widely discussed as an effort to counterbalance the role of the choice of evangelical pastor Rick Warren. Media outlets noted that Warren had compared the legitimization of same-sex marriage to the legalization of "incest, polygamy or 'an older guy marrying a child'". Warren also supported California Proposition 8, which banned same-sex marriage in the state. However, Warren took a conciliatory tone towards Obama: "I applaud his desire to be the president of every citizen." The kickoff event was held at the Lincoln Memorial two days before Obama's swearing-in. It asked "the God of our many understandings" for seven blessings, and to help Obama, as president, in seven ways. Neither HBO's exclusive live broadcast, nor the Presidential Inauguration Committee's blog of the event included the invocation, but the prepared text was posted in full on the website of the Episcopal Diocese of New Hampshire, and video shot informally by attendees was posted on YouTube. National Public Radio, which relied on the HBO feed that omitted it, broadcast a recording the following day with an interview of Robinson about its limited exposure; in that venue, Robinson described it as conforming to the four-fold Franciscan prayer model. According to the Washington Blade, it was the Presidential Inaugural Committee that made the decision for the prayer to be a part of the pre-show and not the show, itself, with a spokesman from that committee maintaining the prayer was dropped through an unspecified "error." Some gay activists maintain that this was a slight on the part of the Obama administration.

In April 2009, Robinson made the Out magazine Third Annual Power 50 list of the most influential gay men and women in the US, landing at number 7. In August 2009, Gene Robinson was a key speaker at the 2009 Greenbelt Festival, held at Cheltenham Racecourse, Gloucestershire, England. Here he delivered three talks, each garnering an attendance in the thousands, based not only on his views of Christianity and homosexuality, but also on human sexuality in general and the rights of LGBT members of society. The three talks were entitled "Homosexuality: What the Bible says & why it matters", "Keeping your cool in the eye of the storm" and "Sexuality and spirituality: keeping them together". As well as these three talks, Gene Robinson made a big impact on some gay and lesbian festival-goers by leading them collectively in prayer on the second night of the festival as part of a small group.

In 2009 he was given the Stephen F. Kolzak Media Award.

In 2012, Macky Alston premiered a documentary about Robinson, Love Free or Die: How the Bishop of New Hampshire is Changing the World, it was screened at Sundance Film Festival.

== Since retirement ==
Robinson preaching in 2026

After resigning as bishop of New Hampshire in 2013, Robinson moved to Washington, D.C., to join the Center for American Progress as a senior fellow and serve as bishop-in-residence at St. Thomas' Parish. In 2014, Robinson and his husband, Mark Andrew, divorced.

From 2017 to 2021, Robinson served as Vice President and Senior Pastor of the Chautauqua Institution, a center for arts, education, recreation and religion in upstate New York.

== See also ==
- Gay bishops
- Homosexuality and the Anglican Communion
- Christianity and homosexuality
