= Edward M. Parker =

American bishop

The Right Reverend Edward Melville Parker D.D., D.C.L.
- Bishop of New Hampshire
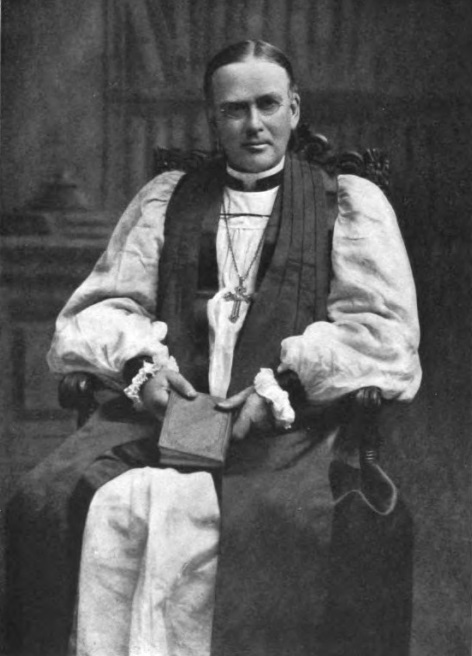
- Church: Episcopal Church
- Diocese: New Hampshire
- In office: 1914–1925
- Predecessor: William Woodruff Niles
- Successor: John T. Dallas
- Previous post: Coadjutor Bishop of New Hampshire (1906-1914)

Orders
- Ordination: 1881 by William Woodruff Niles
- Consecration: February 9, 1906 by William Woodruff Niles

Personal details
- Born: July 11, 1855 Cambridge, Massachusetts, United States
- Died: October 22, 1925 (aged 70) New Orleans, Louisiana, United States
- Buried: Blossom Hill and Calvary Cemeteries
- Denomination: Anglican
- Parents: Henry Melville Parker & Fanny Cushing Stone
- Spouse: Grace M. Elmendorf; Isabella Goodrich

Edward Melville Parker (July 11, 1855 - October 22, 1925) was a bishop of the Episcopal Church in the United States.

== Biography ==
=== Education ===
He was born in Cambridge, Massachusetts, the son of Henry Melville Parker (1820-1863) and Fanny Cushing (Stone) Parker (1827-1898). He was educated at St. Paul's School in Concord, New Hampshire (1868-1874), and at Keble College, Oxford, England (B.A. 1878; M.A. 1881). He received a D.D. from the Berkeley Divinity School in 1906, and a D.C.L. from the Bishop's College (now Bishop's University) in Lennoxville, Quebec, in 1907.

=== Career ===
He was ordained deacon in 1879 and priest in 1881. From 1879 to 1906, he was master of St. Paul's School. He was made bishop coadjutor of New Hampshire in 1906 and was bishop from 1914 until 1925, when he died suddenly during the General Convention of the church.

=== Marriage ===
He married Grace Elmendorf (d. 1888) of Racine, Wisconsin, in 1885. After her death, he remarried Isabella Goodrich (1882-1963) in 1914.

== See also ==
- Episcopal Diocese of New Hampshire
