= Charles Francis Hall (bishop) =

Episcopal bishop of New Hampshire

The Right Reverend Charles Francis Hall D.D.
- Bishop of New Hampshire
- Church: Episcopal Church
- Diocese: New Hampshire
- Elected: October 23, 1947
- In office: 1948–1973
- Predecessor: John T. Dallas
- Successor: Philip Alan Smith

Orders
- Ordination: 1937 by William Appleton Lawrence
- Consecration: January 15, 1948 by Henry Knox Sherrill

Personal details
- Born: April 20, 1908 Dorchester, New Brunswick, Canada
- Died: May 17, 1992 (aged 84)
- Denomination: Anglican
- Parents: Edwin A. Hall & Mary Matilda Blacker-Hamlin
- Spouse: Constance Lilian Hamilton

Charles Francis Hall (April 20, 1908 - May 17, 1992) was the sixth Bishop of New Hampshire in the Episcopal Church from 1948 to 1973.

== Early life ==
Hall was born on April 28, 1908, in Dorchester, New Brunswick, Canada, the son of the Reverend Edwin A. Hall and Mary Matilda Blacker-Hamlin. He received education from Springfield College and later at Yale University in the School of Divinity. He graduated with a Bachelor of Divinity from the Episcopal Theological Seminary in 1936.

== Ordination ==
Hall was ordained deacon in 1936 by Bishop Henry Knox Sherrill of Massachusetts, and as priest a year later by Bishop William Appleton Lawrence of Western Massachusetts. During his deaconate he served as curate of All Saints Church in Worcester, Massachusetts. Later he was the rector of Grace Church in Medford, Massachusetts, and then rector of St Paul's Church in Concord, New Hampshire.

== Bishop ==
Hall was elected, on the third ballot, Coadjutor Bishop of New Hampshire on October 23, 1947. He was consecrated on January 15, 1948 by Presiding Bishop Henry Knox Sherrill in St Paul's Church, Concord, New Hampshire. The co-consecrators were the Bishop of New Hampshire John T. Dallas and the Bishop of Massachusetts Norman Nash.

Hall succeeded as diocesan bishop that same year. His time as bishop was characterized with his cry against racism. In 1965, when Jonathan Daniels, a seminarian and member of St James' Church in Keene, New Hampshire, was shot to death during voter-registration efforts in Selma, Alabama, Bishop Hall flew down to Alabama to deliver a human-rights sermon in a local church.

Hall retired in 1973. He married Constance Lilian Hamilton in 1938 and died on May 17, 1992.
