= Stephen Kolzak =

American casting director and rights activist

Stephen F. Kolzak
- Born: February 19, 1953; Hartford, Connecticut, US
- Died: September 19, 1990 (aged 37); Los Angeles, California, US
- Occupations: casting director LGBT rights advocate AIDS sufferer rights advocate
- Partner: Paul Monette

Stephen F. Kolzak was an American Los Angeles casting director.

He is best known for Altered States (1980), Cheers (1982) and Bachelor Party (1984). He is reported to have chosen the Cheers cast. He was also was the president of Key Club International in 1970–1971.

In the last two years of his life, he was in a long-term relationship with his partner Paul Monette.

He devoted the last part of his life to fighting homophobia and AIDS-phobia within the entertainment industry.

The GLAAD Stephen F. Kolzak Award given to an openly LGBT member of the entertainment or media community for his or her work toward eliminating homophobia has been awarded since 1991, with Kolzak being the posthumous inaugural recipient.
