= Paul Monette =

American author, poet, and activist (1945 – 1995)

- Monette on the cover of West of Yesterday, East of Summer
- Born: October 16, 1945; Lawrence, Massachusetts, U.S.
- Died: February 10, 1995 (aged 49); West Hollywood, California, U.S.
- Cause of death: HIV/AIDS
- Resting place: Forest Lawn Memorial Park, Hollywood Hills
- Education: Phillips Academy; Yale University
- Occupations: Author; poet; LGBT rights activist
- Known for: The Monette–Horwitz Trust
- Notable work: Becoming a Man: Half a Life Story (1992; National Book Award for Nonfiction, 1992); Borrowed Time: An AIDS Memoir (1988)
- Partners: Roger Horwitz (1974–1986); Stephen F. Kolzak (1988–1990); Winston Wilde (1990–1995)

Paul Landry Monette (October 16, 1945 – February 10, 1995) was an American author, poet, and activist best known for his books about gay relationships. In 1992, he won the National Book Award for Nonfiction.

== Early life and career ==
Monette was born in Lawrence, Massachusetts, and graduated from Phillips Academy in 1963 and Yale University in 1967. The rigid social confines of his suburban, middle-class upbringing placed Monette in a position where life in the closet seemed to be the only option. For the majority of Monette's childhood, he felt suffocated and alienated by the strict, religious atmosphere in which he was raised. Monette would later describe this life in the closet as hindering his personal development as a child, as he was forced to deny a part of his identity that was seen as sinful by everyone around him. He described his youth in the closet as an ‘internal exile', an ‘imprisonment', and claimed that closeted life equates to ‘the gutting of all our passions till we are a bunch of eunuchs.'

Conflicted about his sexual orientation, he moved to Boston, Massachusetts, where he taught writing and literature at Milton Academy. In 1978, he moved to West Hollywood with his romantic partner, lawyer Roger Horwitz (November 22, 1941 – October 22, 1986). He wrote and published several novels during this time period, starting with Taking Care of Mrs. Carroll in 1978, which featured a gay protagonist. Monette himself later described the books he produced in this time period "glib and silly little novels." His more serious work came later in his life and was largely driven by his experiences with AIDS.

== Notable works ==
=== Borrowed Time: An AIDS Memoir ===
Monette's most acclaimed book, Borrowed Time: An AIDS Memoir, chronicles Horwitz's fight against, and eventual death from, AIDS. The memoir details the final nineteen months of Horwitz's life, beginning with the day that he was first diagnosed with AIDS. Monette describes the day as "the day we began to live on the moon," isolating himself from the reader in order to demonstrate the devastating loneliness that is felt among AIDS patients and their loved ones. It was a miserable existence for Monette, he writes: "within three months this sense of separateness would grow so acute that I really didn't want to talk to anyone anymore who wasn't touched by AIDS, body or soul."

=== Becoming a Man: Half a Life Story ===
His 1992 memoir, Becoming a Man: Half a Life Story, tells of his life in the closet before coming out, culminating with his meeting Horwitz in 1974. Becoming a Man won the 1992 National Book Award for Nonfiction.

=== Other works ===
Monette also wrote the novelizations of the films Nosferatu the Vampyre (1979), Scarface (1983), Predator (1987), Midnight Run (1988) and Havana (1990), as well as the novels Taking Care of Mrs. Carroll (1978), Afterlife (1990) and Halfway Home (1991). He wrote Afterlife (1990) and Halfway Home (1991) which were centered around people with AIDS and their families' experiences. He once said in an interview that "One person's truth, if told well, does not leave anyone out." Because of this belief, he tried to tell the truth in a way that gave a voice to a community that was usually left out.

== Later life and death ==
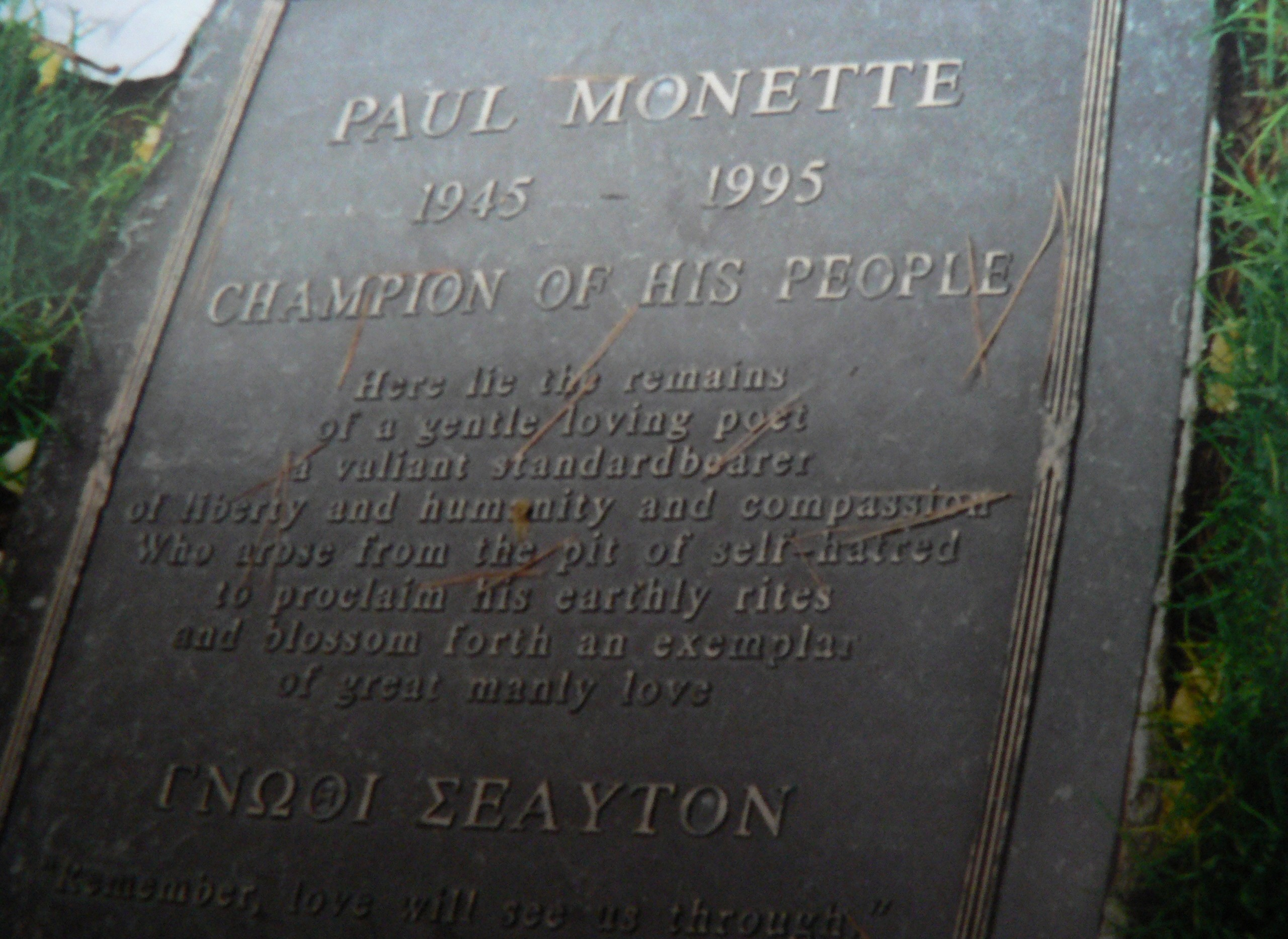
Monette's grave at Forest Lawn Memorial Park, Hollywood Hills

While writing his novel, Afterlife, Monette met television producer Stephen Kolzak, best known as the casting director for the TV show Cheers. Monette and Kolzak were partners for two years, until Kolzak's death from AIDS in September 1990, resulting in what Monette called his “second widowhood.”

Monette's final years, before his own AIDS-related death, are chronicled in the film Paul Monette: The Brink of Summer's End by Monte Bramer and Lesli Klainberg. "By the end of his life, Monette had healed most of his psychic wounds, but his rage persisted." He said, "go without hate, but not without rage; heal the world." He had tried to use his rage to heal the world through his writing and activism. Monette died in Los Angeles, where he lived with his partner of five years, Winston Wilde. Monette was survived by Wilde; his father, Paul Monette Sr.; and his brother, Robert L. Monette. Horwitz and Monette are buried alongside each other at Forest Lawn in Los Angeles, California.

== The Monette–Horwitz Trust ==
Shortly before his death in 1995, Monette established the Monette-Horwitz Trust to commemorate his relationship with Roger Horwitz and to support future LGBT activism and scholarship. Monette's brother, Robert Monette, served as the appointed Trustee until his death in 2015, and his sister-in-law, Brenda Monette, serves as the current trustee.

Monette–Horwitz Trust Awards are given annually to individuals and organizations for their contribution to eradicating homophobia through their literary, scholarly, archival, or activist work. The award's eight-member advisory committee includes Monette's surviving partner, Winston Wilde and the writer Terry Wolverton. The Lesbian Herstory Archives and the June L. Mazer Lesbian Archives received the inaugural Monette-Horwitz Trust Awards in 1998. Other organizations which have since been recipients include Athlete Ally, Naz Foundation India and the Addison Gallery of American Art. Among the individuals who have received the award are Sunil Pant, Lillian Faderman, Allan Bérubé and Leslie Feinberg.

Each year, the Paul Monette-Roger Horwitz Dissertation Prize is awarded to a City University of New York PhD candidate for the best dissertation in LGTBQ studies.

== Legacy ==
In 1993, Monette was the first openly gay person to give his papers to the UCLA Library. In October 2005, the UCLA Charles E. Young Research Library Department of Special Collections, in conjunction with the Monette-Horwitz Trust, celebrated Monette's life and work with a conference, dinner, and an exhibit "One Person's Truth: The life and work of Paul Monette (1945-1995)," which was also available online. In July 2025, the City of West Hollywood will host "Art in Odd Places (AiOP) 2025: VOICE", a citywide public art festival that will feature pieces of Monette's poetry on banners designed by artist Terry S. Hardy and installed in Plummer Park, West Hollywood Park, and along Sunset Boulevard.

== Awards and honors ==
- Lambda Literary Award (Nominee), 1988.
- National Book Critics Circle Award (Finalist — Best Biography), 1988.
- PEN West USA Literary Award for Best Nonfiction, 1989.
- GLAAD Media Visibility Award, 1992.
- Lambda Literary Award For Gay Non-Fiction, 1992.
- National Book Award for Nonfiction, 1992.
- Stonewall Book Award, Barbara Gittings Literature Award, 1992.
- Legacy Project Chicago (Nominee), 1999.
- 501 Must-Read Books, Emma Beare, 2006.

== Bibliography ==
- Monette, Paul (1975). The Carpenter at the Asylum. Boston: Little, Brown. OCLC 1230675. (poetry)
- Monette, Paul (1978). Taking Care of Mrs. Carroll. Boston: Little, Brown. ISBN 0-316-57821-5. (novel)
- Monette, Paul (1979). Nosferatu the Vampyre. New York: Avon Books. ISBN 0-380-44107-1. (novelization of 1979 film)
- Monette, Paul (1979). The Gold Diggers. Los Angeles, New York: Alyson Classics Library. ISBN 1-55583-458-2 (novel)
- Monette, Paul (1981). The Long Shot. New York: Avon Books. ISBN 0-380-76828-3. (novel)
- Monette, Paul (1982). Lightfall. New York: Avon Books ISBN 0-380-81075-1 (novel, cover by Wayne Barlowe)
- Monette, Paul (1983). Scarface. Berkley. ISBN 0425064247.
- Monette, Paul (1987). Predator. ASIN: B019NDSX44.
- Monette, Paul (1988). Borrowed Time: An AIDS Memoir. San Diego: Harcourt Brace Jovanovich. ISBN 0-15-113598-3. (memoirs)
- Monette, Paul (1989). Love Alone: Eighteen Elegies for Rog. New York: St. Martin's Press. ISBN 0-312-01472-4. (poetry)
- Monette, Paul (1989). Midnight Run. ISBN 0425112020.
- Monette, Paul (1990). Afterlife. New York: Crown Publishers. ISBN 0-517-57339-3. (novel)
- Monette, Paul (1990). Havana. ISBN 0804107343.
- Monette, Paul (1991). Halfway Home. New York: Crown Publishers. ISBN 0-517-58329-1. (novel)
- Monette, Paul (1992). Becoming a Man: Half a Life Story. New York: Harcourt Brace Jovanovich. ISBN 0-15-111519-2. (autobiography)
- Monette, Paul (1994). Last Watch of the Night. San Diego: Harcourt Brace Jovanovich. ISBN 0-15-600202-7. (essay collection)
- Monette, Paul (1995). West of Yesterday, East of Summer: New and Selected Poems, 1973–93. New York: St. Martin's Press. ISBN 0-312-13616-1. (poetry)
- Monette, Paul (1997). Sanctuary: A Tale of Life in the Woods. New York: Scribner. ISBN 0-684-83286-0. (novel)
