= Star Black =

American artist

Star Black is a poet, photographer, and artist. She has authored seven collections of poetry and taught in the MFA program at Stony Brook Southampton and at The New School.

She was published in The Paris Review, and has written three books of sonnets, a collection of double sestinas, and a book of collaged free verse. Her poems have been anthologized in The Penguin Book of the Sonnet, 110 Stories: New York Writers After September 11, and The Best American Erotic Poems: From 1880 to The Present. Her collages have been exhibited at Poets House and The Center for Book Arts, and published in One of a Kind: UniqueArtists Books by Pierre Menard Gallery.

== Publications ==
- The Popular Vote (poems) (Saturnalia Press 2019)
- Velleity's Shade (poems), with art work by Bill Knott – (Saturnalia Books 2010)
- Ghostwood (sonnets) – (Melville House 2003)
- Balefire (poetry) – (Painted Leaf Press 1999)
- October for Idas (collaged free verse) – (Painted Leaf Press 1997)
- Waterworn (sonnets) – (A Gathering of the Tribes 1995)
- Double Time (double sestinas) – (Groundwater Press 1995)

== Collages ==
- Stigmata Errata Electa, poems by Bill Knott, collages by Star Black - 2007
