= Deering Reservoir =

Reservoir in Hillsborough County, New Hampshire

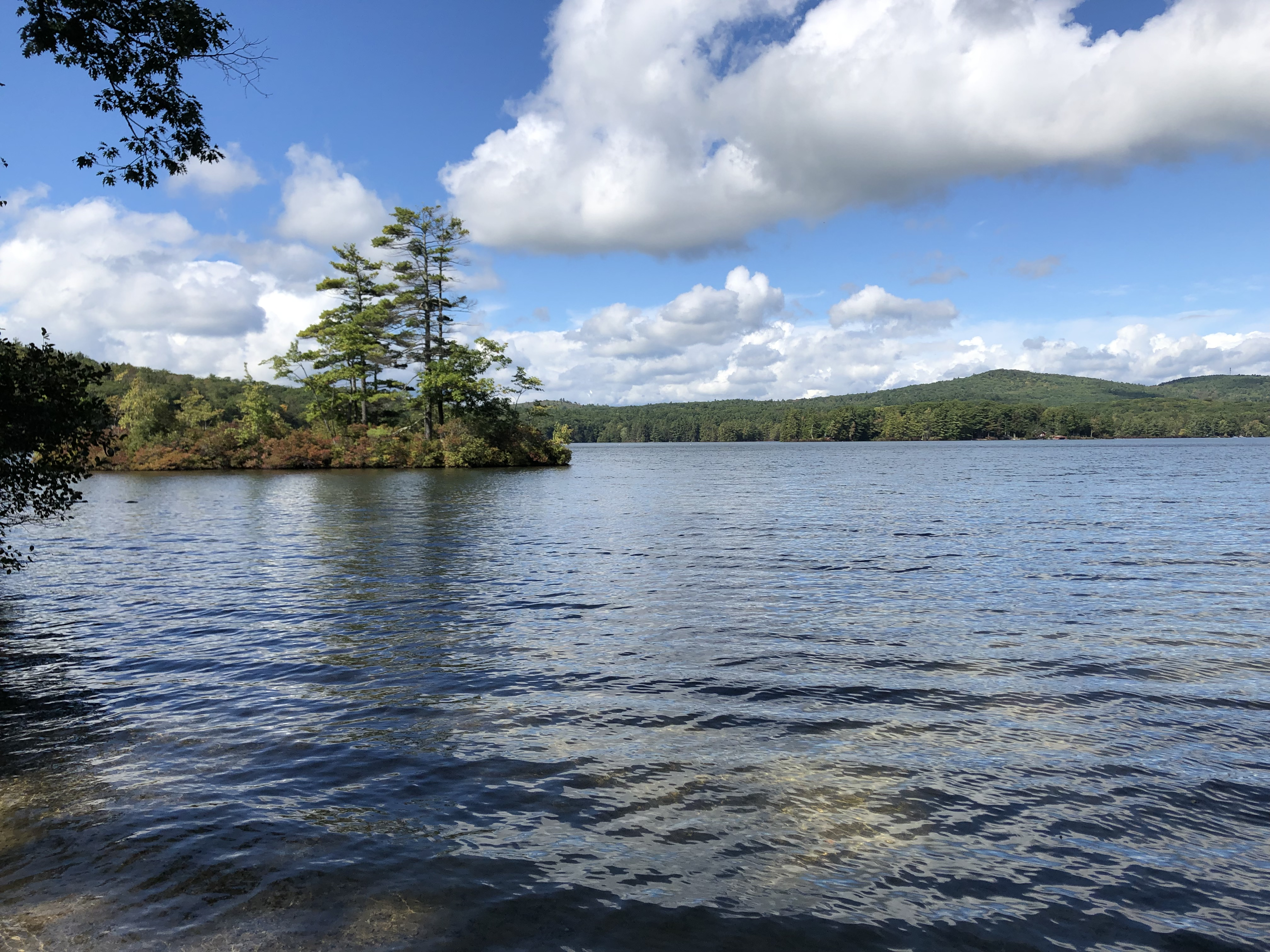

- Location within New Hampshire Location within the United States
- Location: Hillsborough County, New Hampshire
- Coordinates: 43°03′33″N 71°50′47″W
- Primary outflows: Piscataquog River
- Basin countries: United States
- Max. length: 1.5 mi (2.4 km)
- Max. width: 0.8 mi (1.3 km)
- Surface area: 323 acres (1.3 km^{2})
- Average depth: 11 ft (3.4 m)
- Max. depth: 37 ft (11 m)
- Surface elevation: 913 ft (278 m)
- Settlements: Deering

Deering Reservoir is a 323-acre (1.3 km^{2}) water body located in Hillsborough County in southern New Hampshire, United States, in the town of Deering. The lake serves as the headwaters to the Piscataquog River, which flows east to the Merrimack River in Manchester.

The lake is classified as a warmwater fishery, with observed species including rainbow trout, smallmouth bass, largemouth bass, white perch, horned pout, and chain pickerel.

== See also ==
- List of lakes in New Hampshire
