= A Girl's Guide to 21st Century Sex =

2006 British television documentary series

- Created by: Dr Catherine Hood
- Countries of origin: United Kingdom; France
- No. of series: 1
- No. of episodes: 8

Production
- Running time: 45 minutes (including advertisements)
- Production company: Brighter Pictures

Original release
- Network: Channel 5
- Release: 30 October – 18 December 2006

A Girl's Guide to 21st Century Sex is a French-British documentary TV series about sex, which ran in eight episodes on Channel 5 and was presented by Dr. Catherine Hood. The 45-minute-long episodes (including advertisements) were broadcast on Monday nights. The series started on 30 October 2006, with the final programme broadcast on 18 December 2006.

Each episode explained a sex position and covered a sexually transmitted disease. Additionally, the following topics were discussed: sex among people with disabilities and overweight people, penis enlargement devices, penis enlargement surgery, sexual violence against men and penis removal, tantric sex, the g-spot, erectile dysfunction, sex reassignment surgery, cosmetic surgery of the vagina (labiaplasty), swinging, lichen sclerosus, the use of recreational drugs during sex, male homosexual sex in public toilets, full body plastic wrap bondage, and sex dolls.

The programme included close shots of the male and female body as well as footage of sexual intercourse and ejaculation filmed with an internal camera placed inside the vagina. These scenes were filmed starring English-French pornographic actor Stefan Hard and Australian-born pornographic actress Elizabeth Lawrence.

A second series was not commissioned in 2007 or subsequent years (with repeats until 2014).

== Episodes ==
Episode	Topics	Original Air Date
1	Female Squirting Orgasm; Oral Stimulation of the Penis; Position: Missionary; Inside the Vagina; Sexually Transmitted Disease: Gonorrhea; Sex and Overweight; Lesbian Sex	30 October 2006
2	The Clitoris; Position: Doggy style; Penis Enlargement; Sexually Transmitted Disease: Human Papilloma Virus; Reconstructing the Penis after Injury; Oral Stimulation of the Vagina	6 November 2006
3	The G-Spot; Sexual Role-Playing; Position: Side Slide; Sexually Transmitted Disease: Chlamydia; Sex with Small Penis; Sex During Pregnancy	13 November 2006
4	Male Masturbation; Position: Reverse Cowgirl; Sexually Transmitted Disease: Peyronie's disease; Sex When Disabled; Female Multiple Orgasms; Sex and Drugs	20 November 2006
5	Tantric Sex; Position: Spoons; Erection Problems; Sexually Sensitive Areas of the Skin; Sexually Transmitted Disease: Syphilis; Anal Sex	27 November 2006
6	Group sex; Position: X; Sexually transmitted Disease: Lichen sclerosus; Vibrators; Mummification (bondage)	4 December 2006
7	Aphrodisiacs; Position: Splitting the Cicada; Sexually Transmitted Disease: Pubic Lice; Sex at a Higher Age; Sexual Fitness; Cottaging	11 December 2006
8	Vaginal Reconstruction; Position: Lotus; Transsexuals; Sperm	18 December 2006

== Ofcom complaints ==
21 people complained to the national television regulator, Ofcom, that the explicitness of the sexual scenes breached obscenity and broadcasting regulations, and that the series imparted "inappropriate information to vulnerable young girls". Ofcom ruled that there was no rule banning the showing of genuine sexual acts on free-to-air television, and that "in [their] view the portrayal of sex in this programme genuinely sought to inform and educate on sex", concluding that "whilst the visuals were explicit at times, nothing was transmitted in a manner that could be construed as having the potential to harm people under the age of 18", particularly given its context as a serious factual programme, and as such, it was ruled that the episodes were not in breach of any broadcasting regulations.
