= Episcopal Diocese of New Hampshire =

Episcopal Church diocese in the US

Coordinates: 43.2°N 71.5°W

Diocese of New Hampshire Diœcesis Neo-Hantoniensis
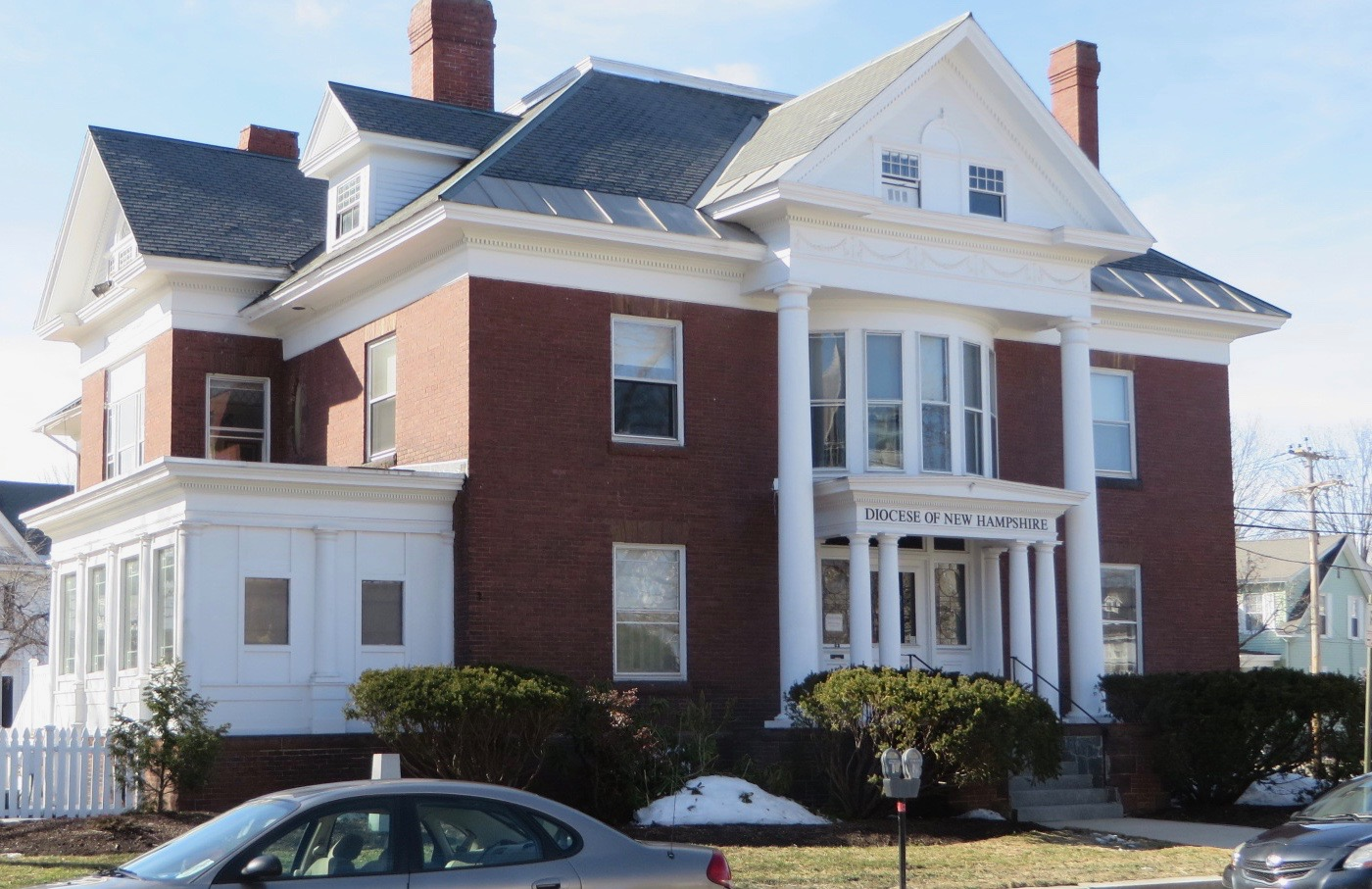
- Episcopal Diocesan House, Concord, NH

- Coat of arms

Location
- Country: United States
- Territory: New Hampshire
- Ecclesiastical province: Province 1

Statistics
- Area: 9,349 sq mi (24,210 km^{2})
- Population: Total: (as of 2019); 1,359,711
- Congregations: 41 (2024)
- Members: 9,158 (2023)

Information
- Denomination: Episcopal Church
- Established: 1841

Current leadership
- Bishop: A. Robert Hirschfeld

Map
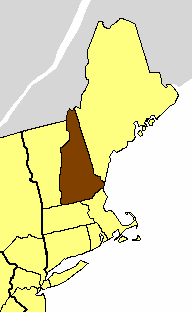
- Location of the Episcopal Church of New Hampshire

The Episcopal Church of New Hampshire, a diocese of the Episcopal Church in the United States of America (ECUSA), covers the entire state of New Hampshire. It was originally part of the Diocese of Massachusetts, but became independent in 1841. The see city is Concord. The diocese has no cathedral.

In 2016, the diocese reported 11,903 members in 49 open parishes and missions. In 2024, the diocese reported average Sunday attendance (ASA) of 2,371 persons, down from 4,451 in 2015. The most recent membership statistics (2023) showed 9,158 persons in 41 churches, a decline from 12,632 in 2015. Plate and pledge income for 2024 was $7,644,794.

== Recent bishops ==
On June 7, 2003, the diocese elected Gene Robinson, the first openly gay bishop consecrated in the Anglican Communion. Robinson retired in 2013 at 65. His successor is the current bishop, A. Robert Hirschfeld, who was elected bishop coadjutor on May 19, 2012, and consecrated bishop in Concord on August 4, 2012. Hirschfeld served with Robinson until Robinson's formal retirement in January 2013.

== Bishops of New Hampshire ==
1. Alexander Viets Griswold, bishop of the Episcopal Eastern Diocese from 1811 to 1832, when the Diocese of New Hampshire was split off. The Episcopal Church lists him as I New Hampshire.
2. Carlton Chase (1844-1870)
3. William Woodruff Niles (1870-1914)
4. Edward Melville Parker (1914-1925)
5. John Thomas Dallas (1926-1948)
6. Charles Francis Hall (1948-1973)
7. Philip Alan Smith (1973-1986)
8. Douglas E. Theuner (1986-2003)
9. V. Gene Robinson (2003-2013)
10. A. Robert Hirschfeld (2013–present)
